= Koichi Yamadera =

Japanese actor and narrator (born 1961)

- 山寺 宏一
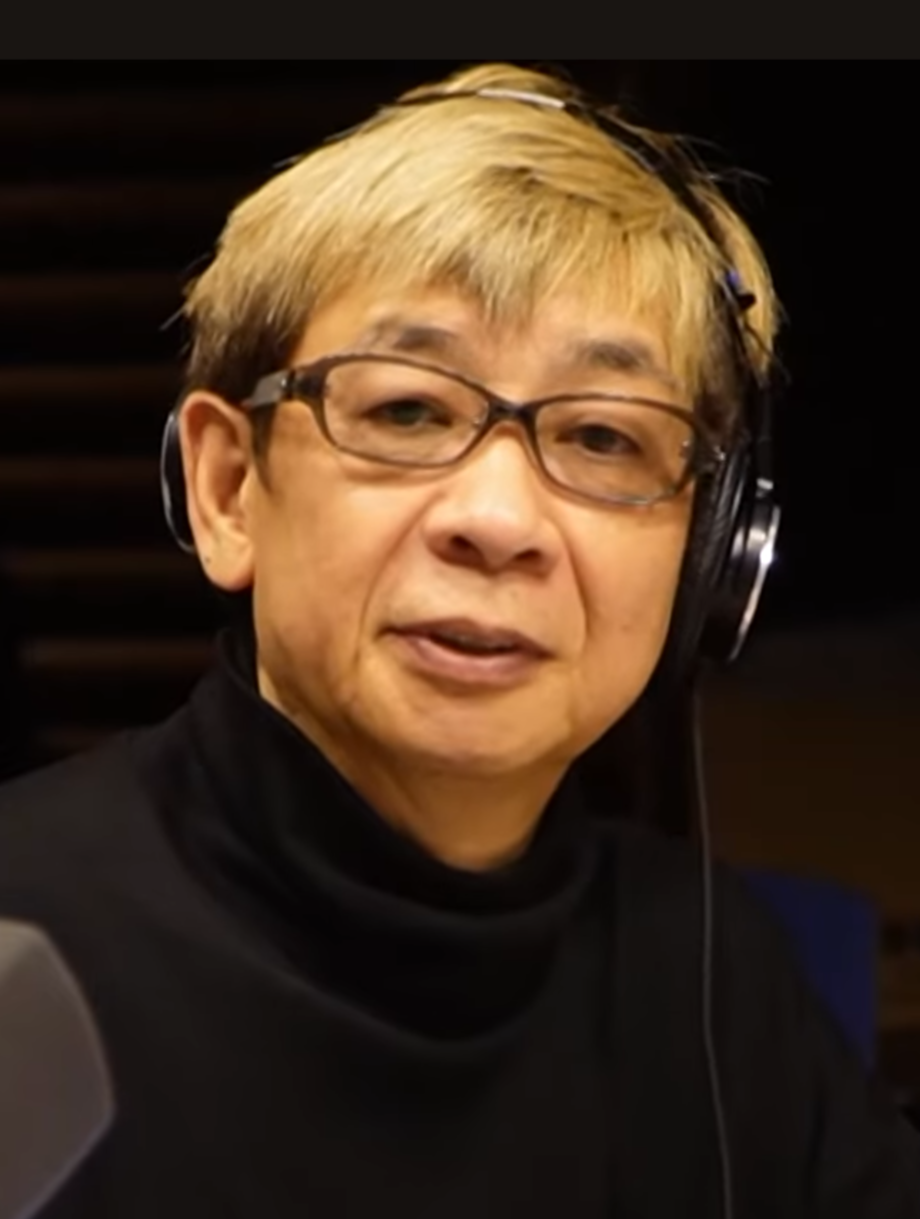
- Yamadera in 2024
- Born: June 17, 1961 (age 65); Shiogama, Miyagi Prefecture, Japan
- Other names: Yama-chan (やまちゃん); Bazooka Yamadera (バズーカ山寺)
- Occupations: Actor; voice actor; narrator; singer
- Years active: 1985–present
- Agent: Across Entertainment
- Spouses: Mika Kanai (m. 1993; div. 2006); Rie Tanaka (m. 2012; div. 2018); Robin Shoko Okada (m. 2021)
- Website: Official profile

Koichi Yamadera (山寺 宏一, Yamadera Kōichi; born June 17, 1961) is a Japanese actor, narrator and singer from Shiogama, Miyagi Prefecture. He graduated from Tohoku Gakuin University's economics school and is currently affiliated with Across Entertainment. Before that, he was affiliated with the Tokyo Actor's Consumer's Cooperative Society.

He is known for his roles in Cowboy Bebop (as Spike Spiegel), the Yakuza videogame series (as Shun Akiyama), Shōwa Genroku Rakugo Shinjū (as Sukeroku), Ghost in the Shell (as Togusa), Neon Genesis Evangelion (as Ryoji Kaji), Gintama (as Shoyo Yoshida / Utsuro), Ninja Scroll (as Jūbei Kibagami), Dragon Ball Super (as Beerus), Anpanman (as Cheese), Ranma ½ (as Ryōga Hibiki/P-chan and the Jusenkyō Guide), Space Battleship Yamato 2199 (as Aberdt Desler), Pretty Cure All Stars DX 3 (as Black Hole) and Lupin III (as the official voice of Koichi Zenigata since 2011). He's been in every Pokémon film to date, though always in different roles, the exception being movie 22, in which he reprised his role as Mew from the first movie, of which movie 22 is a remake. He also voiced Mew in some collateral projects. For Disney, he is the official dubbed voice of Donald Duck, Genie and Sebastian (among others) in Japanese.

In the live action field, he is the official dub-over artist of Will Smith (Yamadera met Smith several times), Eddie Murphy and Jim Carrey. He is also known for voicing Chris Tucker, Jean-Claude Van Damme, Robin Williams, Mike Myers, Stephen Chow, Brad Pitt, Charlie Sheen, Michael Keaton, Michael J. Fox, Will Ferrell, Chris Pratt and Jon Hamm in the Japanese language releases of their respective films.

== History ==
Yamadera was the manager of the Tagajō Senior High School basketball team before he made a name for himself. His voice acting debut was the OVA Megazone 23 as the motorcycle-riding Shinji Nakagawa, while his television debut was the anime Bosco Adventure as the cowardly Otter. Yamadera's break-out role as a voice actor was the anime Ranma ½, in which he played the dual role of Hibiki Ryōga and the Jusenkyō Guide. In 1991, Yamadera joined forces with Toshihiko Seki and Noriko Hidaka to form the acting unit Banana Fritters (バナナフリッターズ, Banana Furittāzu). In October 1997, Yamadera became a host on the TV Tokyo children's variety show Oha Suta. In March 2016, after almost two decades, he announced his retirement from it.

In 2011, Yamadera took over the role of Koichi Zenigata in Lupin III media from Gorō Naya.

In a 2012 article by Japan Times, it was mentioned that he didn't consider doing voice acting at first, and was interested in going into sales or being an onscreen actor.

Yamadera's also known for his versatile range, as shown in the video game Danganronpa V3: Killing Harmony where he voiced all five Monokuma Kubs, including Monophanie (female). According to the Danganronpa V3 official blog, Yamadera is the first person who came to mind as "the same person voicing multiple characters at the same time". No one has as much "multiple characters" experience as him. He was able to take the individual quirks of each of the Monokuma Kubs and make all of them unique.

Other notable examples of multiple voice acting include the Kingdom Hearts series where he voiced Donald Duck, Genie (from Aladdin), Sebastian (from The Little Mermaid), Beast (from Beauty and the Beast), Mushu (from Mulan), and Jaq (from Cinderella) and the Japan Animator Expo series of 35 short films where Yamadera and Megumi Hayashibara voiced all characters.

Yamadera is known as "the man with the seven-colored voice". During casting he is also said to be called "When in doubt, Yamadera".

In 2011 and 2017, TV Asahi conducted a poll among Japanese voice actors and actresses on "who they thought was really the most amazing person in their profession". Yamadera ranked first both times. In 2017, Niconico conducted a survey on popular anime voice actors and actresses. Yamadera ranked first overall, third among female voters and first among male voters.

In 2018, he joined the cast of the American animated web series Gen:Lock starring Michael B. Jordan. According to the series showrunner Gray Haddock, "Yamadera-san gives Kazu a fantastic balance of attitude and strength, and as anime fans we're doing our best not to geek out that he's joined the cast".

In 2019, Will Smith came to Japan for a solo interview, and at Smith's request, Yamadera performed a live voiceover, which was highly praised by Smith. This was aired on NTV's "news every" and "Oha!4 NEWS LIVE" on June 5 and 11, respectively.

== Personal life ==
Yamadera has been married three times; first, on May 23, 1993, to fellow voice actress Mika Kanai. They divorced in 2006, although it wasn't publicized until 2007.

His second wife was voice actress Rie Tanaka, then 33-years-old, and he was 51. They married on June 17, 2012, with a ceremony held in Hawaii on January 3, 2013. In August 2018, they announced that they had filed for divorce.

On June 14, 2021, at age 60, he announced his marriage to radio personality Robin Shoko Okada, who is 31 years younger than him.

== Filmography ==
=== Television animation ===
1986

- Bosco Adventure (Otter)
- Mock & Sweet (Cookie, mole, man)

1987

- Red Photon Zillion (Guardock (episodes 26, 28, 30 and 31), navigator #A (episode 13), Mash (episodes 15 and 16), Nōza soldier (episode 16), Nōza Army staff officer (episode 19), staff officer #A (episode 26))
- Bikkuriman (Heikō-oni)
- City Hunter (Abe, hitman, skunk, Inspector Fukamachi, additional voices)
- Esper Mami (Subordinate #A, pupil #B, director, man #C, Kabi)
- Akakage (Tomizō Karakuri, Jōshū-man, Tenjiku Yami, ninja)
- Legend of the Century's End Savior: Fist of the North Star 2 (Villager)
- Machine Robo: Battle Hackers (Drill Crusher)
- Slippy Dandy (Slippy Dandy)

1988

- Sonic Soldier Borgman (Dust Jead, Thunder)
- City Hunter 2 (Silver fox, Rubāto, Shirozaru, government person, Mosada, Misawa, Akira, Kazama, Master, Schmit, additional voices)
- Wowser (Officer Whistle)
- Ikinari Dagon (Pilot)
- Mashin Hero Wataru (Kurama Wataribe, Bibide Sēkima Tsū (episode 30), Umashika (episode 34), Niō Otōto (episode 36))
- Meimon! Daisan Yukyūbu (Naoya Kyōmoto)
- Moeru! Onii-san (Teacher #A (episode 5))
- Soreike! Anpanman (Cheese, Kabao-kun, Kabao-kun's father, Kamameshidon, Yuzujijiya, Tanuki-Oni, Jam Ojisan)
- Tsuide ni Tonchinkan (Imahishirō Furusawa)
- Moeru! Onii-san (Dakku Nicholson, Spartan X)

1989

- Mobile Police Patlabor (Hiker #C)
- Madō King Granzort (Shaman)
- The Adventures of Peter Pan (Checco, Nana)
- Ranma ½ (Ryōga Hibiki/P-chan, Jusenkyō Guide)
- Legend of Heavenly Sphere Shurato (Dragon King Ryōma, narrator)
- Time Trouble Tondekeman! (Tutankhamun (episode 4))

1990

- Nadia: The Secret of Blue Water (Ayerton)
- Idol Angel Yokoso Yoko (Kurabito (episode 5), Daiichi (episode 26), Cycle Jackson (episode 28))
- Kyatto Ninden Teyandee (Karamaru, Tomekichi, Dung Beetle #5)
- Mashin Hero Wataru 2 (Kurama Wataribe)
- Brave Exkaiser (Osamu Tokuda, trader, Narrator)

1991

- Dragon Ball Z (Tenshinhan (episodes 82 and 84))

1992

- Ashita Free Kick (Ūgo (episode 29))
- Crayon Shin-chan (Boss)
- Genki Bakuhatsu Ganbaruger (Bananān)
- O~i! Ryoma (Isami Kondō)
- Super Zugan (Shintarō Oda)

1993

- Nekketsu Saikyō Go-Saurer (Supervision (episode 13))

1995

- Neon Genesis Evangelion (Ryōji Kaji)
- Brave Police J-Decker (Miruamiigo, Uno, Osōjioba-san, giant)
- The Doraemons (Jaidora)

1997

- City Hunter: Goodbye, My Sweetheart (Professor Takeaki Mutō)
- Gakkyū Ō Yamazaki (Yamadera)

1998

- Cowboy Bebop (Spike Spiegel, Ein)
- Dokkiri Doctor (Doctor Haruka Nishikikōji, narrator)
- Lupin III: Honō no Kioku ~Tōkyō Crisis~ (Michael Suzuki, Gondō)
- Otoko wa Tsurai yo (Torajirō Kurama)
- Pokémon (Kamonegi (episode 49))

1999

- Reign: The Conqueror (Darius III of Persia)
- Shūkan Storyland (Noro, Kentarō Hashimoto)

2000

- Hidemari no Ki (Ryōan Tezuka)

2001

- Dā! Dā! Dā! (Yuzuhiko (episode 51))
- Parappa the Rapper (Luckily (–episode 16 and 18))

2002

- Ghost in the Shell: Stand Alone Complex (Togusa, The Laughing Man (Aoi), Baby Ruth, Watchdog Robot)
- Tsuribaka Nisshi (Densuke Hamasaki)

2003

- Astro Boy: Mighty Atom (Memata (episode 21))
- Di Gi Charat Nyo! (Yama-chan (episodes 15 and 16))
- Galaxy Angel (Colonel Harry (episodes 39–40))
- Fighting Spirit: Champion Road TV Special (Kazuki Sanada)
- Lupin III: Otakara Henkyaku Dai-sakusen!! (Ivan Krokovich (Rats))
- Mermaid Saga (Yūta)
- Harlock Saga (Harlock)

2004

- Kaiketsu Zorori (Zorori)
- Ghost in the Shell: S.A.C. 2nd GIG (Togusa)
- Samurai Champloo (Nagamitsu (episode 8))

2005

- Agatha Christie's Great Detectives Poirot and Marple (Norman Gale (episodes 36–39))
- Honey and Clover (Rōmaiya-senpai)
- Hajime ni Fumajime: Kaiketsu Zorori (Zorori)
- Detective Conan (Kyōsuke Haga (episodes 385–387))
- Xenosaga: The Animation (Gaignun Kukai, Albedo Piazzolla)

2006

- Ah! My Goddess (Troubador (episode 12))
- Fist of the Blue Sky (Kenshirō Kasumi)
- Ghost in the Shell: Stand Alone Complex – Solid State Society (Togusa)

2007

- Detective Conan (Masateru Hira (episode 449))
- Oh! Edo Rocket (Ginjirō the Locksmith)

2008

- Allison & Lillia (Carr Benedict)
- Inazuma Eleven (Noberu Raito (episode 9))
- Michiko to Hatchin (Daniela (episode 11))
- Stitch! (Stitch, Yūna's father (episode 1))
- Yatterman (Narrator (Yama-chan), Yatter-Mechas, Odatebuta, Cockpit Mechas, Program chairman Tōku, Hideo Higashikokubaru, Moai, Kenichi Mikawa)

2009

- Fullmetal Alchemist: Brotherhood (Isaac McDougall (episode 1))
- Gin Tama (Shōyō Yoshida)
- Inazuma Eleven (Shūgo Nikaidō (episodes 20–21), Otomura Gakuya)
- Kawa no Hikari (Father)
- Pokémon Fushigi no Dungeon: Sora no Tankentai Toki no Yami wo Meguro Saigo no Bōken (Narrator)
- Stitch! ~Itazura Alien no Daibōken~ (Stitch, Yūna's father)

2010

- Stitch! ~Zutto Saikō no Tomodachi~ (Stitch, Narration, Yūna's father)

2011

- Appleseed XIII (Briareos)
- Lupin III: Blood Seal – Eternal Mermaid (Koichi Zenigata)

2012

- Arashi no Yoru ni: Himitsu no Tomodachi (Giro) and (Barry)
- Hunter × Hunter (Second Series) (Silva Zoldyck)
- Lupin the Third: The Woman Called Fujiko Mine (Koichi Zenigata)
- Lupin III: Record of Observations of the East – Another Page (Koichi Zenigata)
- Sword Art Online (Heathcliff / Akihiko Kayaba)

2013

- Space Battleship Yamato 2199 (Abelt Desler)

2014

- Magica Wars (Takesuzume)
- Insufficient Direction (Kantoku-kun)
- Space Dandy (Ton Jravolta)
- Nobunaga Concerto (Yasuke)
- Cross Ange (Jurai Asuka Misurugi)

2015

- Lupin the Third Part 4 (Koichi Zenigata)
- Chaos Dragon (Agito)
- Dragon Ball Super (Beerus)
- One Piece (Donquixote Rocinante/Corazon)
- Gin Tama (Shōyō Yoshida)

2016

- Shōwa Genroku Rakugo Shinjū (Sukeroku)
- The Disastrous Life of Saiki K. (Kumagurou Saiki)
- Concrete Revolutio: Choujin Gensou – The Last Song (Washizu Yuusei (episode 1))
- Lupin III: Italian Game (Koichi Zenigata)

2017

- The Dragon Dentist (Godō)
- Onihei (Matataro (episode 13))

2018

- Fist of the Blue Sky Re: Genesis (Kenshiro)
- Layton Mystery Detective Agency: Kat's Mystery-Solving Files (Professor Hershel Layton)
- Sword Art Online: Alicization (Akihiko Kayaba (episode 5,6,45)

2019

- Carole & Tuesday (Desmond)

2020

- My Hero Academia 4 (Gentle Criminal)
- Motto! Majime ni Fumajime Kaiketsu Zorori (Zorori)
- Genie Family 2020 (Hakushon Daimaō)
- Listeners (Kevin Valentine)

2021

- Mars Red (Tokuichi Yamagami)
- Gloomy the Naughty Grizzly (Gloomy)
- Lupin the 3rd Part 6 (Koichi Zenigata)

2022

- Detective Conan (Tsutomu Akai)
- Bleach: Thousand-Year Blood War (Quilge Opie)
- Arknights: Prelude to Dawn (Wei Yenwu)

2023

- My Home Hero (Shino)
- Go! Go! Vehicle Zoo (Gao-nii)
- Demon Slayer: Kimetsu no Yaiba – Swordsmith Village Arc (Zohakuten)

2024

- Ishura (Shalk the Sound Slicer)
- Mission: Yozakura Family (Momo Yozakura)
- My Hero Academia 7 (Gentle Criminal)
- Ranma ½ (Ryōga Hibiki)

2025

- Your Forma (Kuprian Valentinovich Napolov)
- Miru: Paths to My Future (Yoshimura)
- Lazarus (Dr. Skinner)
- To Be Hero X (Ahu)
- Mobile Suit Gundam GQuuuuuuX (Gihren Zabi)

2026

- Jujutsu Kaisen (Miguel Oduol)
- Dr. Stone (Why-Man male voice)^{Ep. 94 credits}

=== Original net animation (ONA) ===
2023

- Lupin the 3rd vs. Cat's Eye (Koichi Zenigata)
- Pluto (North No. 2)

=== Original video animation (OVA) ===
1985

- Megazone 23 (Shinji Nakagawa)
- Dancouga – Super Beast Machine God (Abel)

1986

- Machine Robo: Revenge of Cronos (Velt Zaruck (episodes 2 and 3))

1987

- Bubblegum Crisis (Fargo (episodes 5, 7 and 8))
- Gai: Yôma kakusei (Guy)
- Lupin III: The Fuma Conspiracy (Police Officer B)

1988

- Armor Hunter Mellowlink (Borufu)
- Bio Booster Armor Guyver (Zelbubuth)
- Ten Little Gall Force (Kennichi Shonora)
- Legend of the Galactic Heroes (Bruno von Silverberg)
- Mahjong Hishō-den – Naki no Ryū (Hiramatsu)

1989

- Ariel (Demonova)
- Goku Midnight Eye (Coroner #1)
- Guyver (OVA) (Zerebuth)
- Legend of Heavenly Sphere Shurato (Dragon King Ryōma)
- Megazone 23 Part III (Shion)
- Sonic Soldier Borgman: Lover's Rain (Thunder)
- Assemble Insert (Subordinate #3)
- The Borgman: Last Battle (Curtis Hidaka)
- Bucchigiri (Daisuke Kiriyama)
- Fuuma no Kojirou (Rinpyō)
- Gosenzo-sama Banbanzai! (Bannai Tatara)
- Shin Mashin Eiyūden Wataru: Mashinzan-hen (Kurama Wataribe)

1990

- The Hakkenden (Dōsetsu Inuyama)
- Nineteen 19 (Kazuya Kawara)
- Ranma ½: Hot Song Contest (Ryoga/P-chan, Jusenkyō Guide)
- Goddamn (Gen Todoroki)
- Shiawase no Katachi (Koitsu)
- Mashin Eiyūden Wataru: Sōkaizan Eiyū Densetsu (Kurama Wataribe)

1991

- CB Kyara: Nagaigō World (Baron Ashura)
- Detonator Orgun (Tomoru Shindō, Orgun)
- Doomed Megalopolis (Junichi Narutaki)
- Mermaid's Forest (Yūta)

1992

- Green Legend Ran (Chimin)
- Tokyo Babylon (Keiji Sansen)
- Treasure Island Memorial Yūnagi to Yobare ta Otoko (Jim Hawkins)
- OZ (Ordis Nate)

1993

- Mermaid's Scar (Yūta)
- The Hakkenden ~Shinshō~ (Dōsetsu Inuyama)
- Idol Defense Force Hummingbird (Yajima)
- Mashin Eiyuden Wataru: Warinaki Toki no Monogatari (Kurama Wataribe)
- Ranma ½ OVA (Ryoga/P-chan)
- Sonic Soldier Borgman 2: New Century 2058 (Yōma Tsukai Master)
- The Super Dimension Century Orguss 02 (Manning)
- Youseiki Suikoden: Masei Kourin (Ryō Hamura)

1994

- Compiler (Nachi Igarashi)
- Otaku no Seiza (Man)
- Phantom Quest Corp. (Lieutenant Kōzō Karino)
- Wild 7 (Happyaku)
- Ranma ½ Special: Yomigaeru Kioku (Ryoga/P-chan)
- Nana Toshi Monogatari: Hokkyokukai Sensen (Almarick Asval)

1995

- Elf Princess Rane (Gō Takarada)
- Hikyō Tanken Fam & Ihrlie (Miguel)
- Ranma ½ Super (Ryoga/P-chan)
- Shin Megami Tensei: Tokyo Revelation (Takehiko Kuki)

1996

- Apocalypse Zero (Kakugo Hagakure, Zero)
- Shamanic Princess (Kagetsu)
- Special Duty Combat Unit Shinesman (Shogo Yamadera/Shinesman Gray)

1997

- Battle Athletes Victory (Caster (episodes 5 and 6))
- Photon (Sir Papacharino Nanadan)
- Darkstalkers (Lord Raptor/Zabel Zarock)

1998

- Geobreeders (Shōzō Irie)
- Queen Emeraldas (Tochirō Ōyama)

1999

- Sol Bianca: The Legacy (Sancho)
- Harlock Saga: Nīberungu no Yubiwa: Golden Rain (Harlock, Tochirō Daizan)
- Saiyuki (Sha Gojyo)

2007

- Nasu Suitcase no Wataridori (Jean-Louis Chochi)

2008

- Ranma ½: Nightmare! Incense of Spring Sleep (Ryoga/P-chan, Jusenkyō Guide)

2015

- Lupin III: Part IV Specials (Koichi Zenigata)

2017

- The Ultraman: Jackal Vs Ultraman (Melos, King Jackal)

=== Film animation ===
1986

- Captain Tsubasa: Sekai Daikessen!! Jr. World Cup (Ramon Victorino)

1988

- Mobile Suit Gundam: Char's Counterattack (Gyunei Guss)
- Kimagure Orange Road: I Want to Return to That Day (Policeman)
- Kyoufu no Bio Ningen Saishuu Kyoushi (Convenience store employee)

1989

- The Five Star Stories (Man #B)
- Kiki's Delivery Service (Osono's husband, police officer, TV announcer)
- SD Sengokuden Chapter of Abaowakuu (Imiko)
- Soreike! Anpanman: Kira Kira Boshi no Namida (Cheese, Kamameshidon, Sakasaman)
- Utsunomiko (Fisher)
- Venus Wars (Jeff)

1990

- Sonic Soldier Borgman: Lover's Rain (Thunder)
- MAROKO (Bannai Tatara)
- Soreike! Anpanman: Baikinman no Gyakushū (Cheese, Kamameshidon)

1991

- Gekkō no Piasu: Yumemi to Gin no Bara Kishi Dan (Devil King Child)
- Ranma 1/2: Chūgoku Nu Kunlun Dai Kessen! Okite Yaburi no Gekitō Hen (Ryōga Hibiki)
- Soreike! Anpanman: Tobe! Chibigon (Cheese, Kabaotto)

1992

- Hashire Melos! (Melos)
- Ranma 1/2: Kessen Momo Maboroshi Kyō! Hanayome wo Datsu Rimodose!! (Ryōga Hibiki)
- Silent Möbius: The Motion Picture 2 (Nachi Aida)
- Soreike! Anpanman: Tsumiki Jō no Himitsu (Cheese, Kamameshidon, Kabaotto, Cabinet Minister Garangara)

1993

- Ninja Scroll (Jūbee Kibagami)
- Soreike! Anpanman: Kyōryū Nosshī no Daibōken (Cheese, Kamameshidon, Kabaotto)

1994

- Darkside Blues (Hochi)
- Ranma 1/2: Chō Musabetsu Kessen! Ranma Team vs. Densetsu no Hō-Ō (Ryōga Hibiki)
- Soreike! Anpanman: Ririkaru Magical Mahō no Gakkō (Cheese, Kamameshidon)

1995

- Ghost in the Shell/Kōkaku Kidōtai (Togusa)
- Memories (Miguel)
- Soreike! Anpanman: Yūrei Sen wo Yattsukero (Cheese, Kabaotto)

1996

- Apo Apo World: Giant Baba 90 Fun Ipponshōbu (Giant Baba)
- Soreike! Anpanman: Kara Tobu Ehon to Glass no Kutsu (Cheese, Kamameshidon, Kabaotto)
- Soreike! Anpanman: Baikinman to 3 Baipanshi (Akakinman)
- X (Sorata Arisugawa)

1997

- Chokin Senshi Cashman (Chapitt (Cashman))
- Gekijōban: Cutie Honey F: Densetsu no Chō Nishinobiyoru Ma no Te! Ai to Seigi no Ken de Tatakae, Honey!! (Robalt)
- Neon Genesis Evangelion: Death & Rebirth (Ryōji Kaji)
- Soreike! Anpanman: Niji no Pyramid (Cheese, Kamameshidon, Kabaotto)
- The End of Evangelion (Ryōji Kaji)

1998

- Crayon Shin-chan: Dengeki! Buta no Hizume Isakusen (Barrel)
- Pokémon: The First Movie (Mew)
- Kidō Senkan Nadesico -The Prince of Darkness- (Hokusen)
- Soreike! Anpanman: Tenohira wo Taiyō ni (Cheese, Kabaotto)

1999

- The Doraemons: Okashinao Kashina Okashinana? (Jaidora)
- Pokémon: The Movie 2000 (Lugia)
- Soreike! Anpanman: Yūki no Hana Gahirakutoki (Cheese, Kabaotto)

2000

- Alexander Senki Gekijōban (Darius III of Persia)
- Pokémon 3: The Movie (Deibitto the Butler)
- Soreike! Anpanman: Marina no Namida (Cheese, Kabaotto, Uzumakiman)

2001

- Cowboy Bebop: The Movie (Spike Spiegel)
- Pokémon 4Ever (Hunter)
- Sakura Wars: The Movie (Brent Furlong)
- Soreike! Anpanman: Gomira no Hoshi (Cheese, Kamameshidon, Kabaotto)
- Vampire Hunter D: Bloodlust (Meier Link)

2002

- Pokémon Heroes (Rosshi)
- Millennium Actress (The Man with the Key)
- Soreike! Anpanman: Rōru to Rōra: Ukigumo Jō no Himitsu (Cheese, Kabaotto)

2003

- Pokémon: Jirachi Wish Maker (Butler the Magician)
- Soreike! Anpanman: Ruby no Negai (Cheese, Kabaotto)
- Tokyo Godfathers (Taxi driver)

2004

- Pokémon: Destiny Deoxys (Professor Lund)
- Ghost in the Shell 2: Innocence (Togusa)
- Soreike! Anpanman: Yumeneko no Kuni no Nyanī (Cheese, Kabaotto)

2005

- Arashi no Yoru Ni (Barry)
- Pokémon: Lucario and the Mystery of Mew (Sir Aaron)
- Case Closed: Strategy Above the Depths (Hironari Kusaka)
- Soreike! Anpanman: Happy no Daibouken (Cheese, Kabaotto)

2006

- Atagōru ha Neko no Mori (Nazonu Hideyoshi)
- Pokémon Ranger and the Temple of the Sea (Jack "Jackie" Walker)
- Majime ni Fumajime Kaiketsu Zorori: Nazo no Ohōdaiji Sakusen (Zorori)
- Keroro Gunsō the Super Movie (Zorori)
- Paprika (Doctor Morio Osanai)
- Soreike! Anpanman: Inochi no Hoshi no Dōrī (Cheese, Kamameshidon, Kabaotto)

2007

- Appleseed Ex Machina (Briareos Hecatonchires)
- Pokémon: The Rise of Darkrai (Baron Alberto)
- Soreike! Anpanman: Shabon Dama no Burun (Cheese, Kabaotto)
- Sword of the Stranger (Luo Lang)

2008

- Gekijōban: Yatterman: Shin Yatter Mecha Ōshūgo! Omocha no Kuni de Dai Kessen da Koron! (Yatter Mechas, Narrator)
- Pokémon: Giratina and the Sky Warrior (Mugen Graceland)
- Ghost in the Shell 2.0 (Togusa)
- Highlander: The Search for Vengeance (Marcus Octavius)
- Soreike! Anpanman: Yōsei Rinrin no Himitsu (Cheese, Kamameshidon, Kabaotto)

2009

- Crayon Shin-chan Otakebe! Kasukabe Yasei Ōkoku (Director Shizen)
- Evangelion: 2.0 You Can (Not) Advance (Ryōji Kaji)
- Pokémon: Arceus and the Jewel of Life (Gishin)
- Professor Layton and the Eternal Diva (Pierre Starbuck)
- Soreike! Anpanman: Dadandan to Futago no Hoshi (Cheese, Kabaotto, Kotetsujī-san)
- Uchū Senkan Yamato: Fukkatsu hen (Susumu Kodai)
- Yona Yona Penguin (Daitenshi)

2010

- Gintama: The Movie (Shoyo Yoshida)
- Pokémon: Zoroark: Master of Illusions (Goon)

2011

- PreCure All Stars DX3: Deliver the Future! The Rainbow-Colored Flower That Connects the World (Black Hole)
- Ghost in the Shell: Stand Alone Complex – Solid State Society 3D (Togusa)
- Pokémon the Movie: Black—Victini and Reshiram and White—Victini and Zekrom (Momont)
- Friends: Mononoke Shima no Naki (Gunjō)

2012

- Magic Tree House (Dad)
- A Letter to Momo (Kawa)
- Pokémon the Movie: Kyurem vs. the Sword of Justice (Cobalion)
- Doraemon: Nobita and the Island of Miracles ~Animal Adventure~ (Sharman)
- Stitch and the Planet of Sand (Stitch)

2013

- Dragon Ball Z: Battle of Gods (Beerus)
- Gintama: The Movie: The Final Chapter: Be Forever Yorozuya (Time Thief)
- Lupin the 3rd vs. Detective Conan: The Movie (Koichi Zenigata)
- Pokémon the Movie: Genesect and the Legend Awakened (Red Genesect)
- Short Peace: Possessions (Otoko)

2014

- Saint Seiya: Legend of Sanctuary (Gemini Saga)
- Pokémon the Movie: Diancie and the Cocoon of Destruction (Ninja Riot)
- Lupin III: Jigen's Gravestone (Koichi Zenigata)

2015

- Pokémon the Movie: Hoopa and the Clash of Ages (Hoopa Unbound Form)
- Dragon Ball Z: Resurrection 'F' (Beerus)
- Stitch! A Perfect Memory (Stitch)

2016

- Kingsglaive: Final Fantasy XV (Titus Drautos)
- Pokémon the Movie: Volcanion and the Mechanical Marvel (Jarvis)

2017

- Sword Art Online The Movie: Ordinal Scale (Akihiko Kayaba)
- Pokémon the Movie: I Choose You! (Marshadow)
- Space Battleship Yamato 2202 (Abelt Desler)

2018

- Batman Ninja (Batman)
- Pokémon the Movie: The Power of Us (Oliver)
- Dragon Ball Super: Broly (Beerus)
- Waka Okami wa Shōgakusei! (Bunta Kise)
- Magical Girl Lyrical Nanoha Detonation (Phil Maxwell)

2019

- City Hunter the Movie: Shinjuku Private Eyes (Shinji Mikuni)
- NiNoKuni (Balton)
- Dragon Quest: Your Story (Surarin)
- Pokémon: Mewtwo Strikes Back—Evolution (Mew)
- NiNoKuni (Barton ROSCH)
- Lupin III: The First (Koichi Zenigata)

2020

- A Whisker Away (Cat Storekeeper)
- BEM: Become Human (Manstoll)
- Over the Sky (Gimon)
- Pokémon the Movie: Secrets of the Jungle (Dr. Zed)

2021

- Gintama The Final (Shoyo Yoshida / Utsuro)
- Mobile Suit Gundam: Hathaway's Flash (Hundley Yeoksam)
- Words Bubble Up Like Soda Pop (Fujiyama)
- Jujutsu Kaisen 0 (Miguel)

2022

- Deemo: Memorial Keys (Professor Valenski)
- Dragon Ball Super: Super Hero (Beerus)

2025

- Eiga Shimajirō Shimajirō to Yūki no Uta (Gorinosuke)
- Crayon Shin-chan the Movie: Super Hot! The Spicy Kasukabe Dancers (Kabir)
- Batman Ninja vs. Yakuza League (Batman)

2026

- Chimney Town: Frozen in Time
- Mobile Suit Gundam: Hathaway – The Sorcery of Nymph Circe (Hundley Yeoksam)
- Shin Gekijōban Keroro Gunsō: Fukkatsu Shite Sokkō Chikyū Metsubō no Kiki de Arimasu! (Space Police Chief)

=== Web animation ===
2006

- Intrigue in the Bakumatsu – Irohanihoheto (Sakamoto Ryōma)

2008

- Megumi (Shigeru Yokota)

2014

- Japan Animator Expo (multiple characters)

2019

- Gen:Lock (Kazu Iida)

2020

- Ghost in the Shell: SAC_2045 (Togusa)

2021

- Eden (Zero)
- Baki Hanma (Lips, Teeth, Tongue)

=== Video games ===
1993

- Tengai Makyō: Fūun Kabukiden (Mangetsu no Ungie, Priest Mōsufīl)

1994

- Emerald Dragon (TurboGrafx-16 version) (Yaman)

1995

- Logos Panic
- Strikers 1945 (Narration)

1996

- Valkyrie no Densetsu Gaiden: Rosa no Bōken (Narration)

1997

- Mystical Ninja Starring Goemon (Shunpū Danshin)
- Neon Genesis Evangelion Girlfriend of Steel (Ryōji Kaji, tank corps group members, soldier)
- Tengai Makyō: Daiyon no Mokushiroku (Kakado, Kyōraku no Sukarubīto)
- Tales of Destiny (Karyl Sheeden)

1998

- Brave Fencer: The Legend of Musashi (Ed, King Yakuinikku)
- Gun Bare! Game Tengoku (Pōku)
- Mobile Suit Gundam: Gihren's Greed: Blood of Zeon (Master Pierce Rayer)
- Neon Genesis Evangelion: Eva to Yukai na Nakama Tachi (Ryōji Kaji)
- Rival Schools: United By Fate (Daigo Kazama)
- SD Gundam G Generation (Gyunei Guss)
- Soukaigi (Kaname Gabu)
- Street Fighter Zero 3 (Cody, Balrog, narration)

1999

- Counter-Strike
- Neon Genesis Evangelion (Ryōji Kaji)
- SD Gundam G Generation Zero (Gyunei Guss)
- Tron and Henchmen (Shitappaer)

2000

- Capcom vs. SNK: Millennium Fight 2000 (Balrog)
- Pop'n Music Disney Tunes (Donald Duck)
- Return of The Incredible Machine: Contraptions
- SD Gundam G Generation F (Gyunei Guss, Master Pierce Rayer)
- Super Robot Wars Alpha (Gyunei Guss)

2001

- Adventure of Tokyo Disney Sea ~Losing of Jewel's Secret (Genie, Sebastian)
- Capcom vs. SNK 2: Millionaire Fighting 2001 (Balrog)
- The Incredible Machine: Even More Contraptions
- Kikō Heidan J-Phoenix (Gurenrīdā)
- SD Gundam G Generation F.I.F (Gyunei Guss, Master Pierce Rayer)

2002

- Harry Potter and the Chamber of Secrets (Gilderoy Lockhart)
- Kikō Heidan J-Phoenix: Burst Tactics (Gurenrīdā)
- Kingdom Hearts (Donald Duck, Genie, Sebastian, Beast, Mushu)
- SD Gundam G Generation NEO (Gyunei Guss)
- Tales of the World: Narikiri Dungeon 2 (Johnny Sheeden)
- Xenosaga Episode I: Der Wille zur Macht (Gaignun Kukai, Albedo Piazzolla)

2003

- 2nd Super Robot Wars Alpha (Gyunei Guss)
- Bujingai (Lei Jenron)
- Drakengard (Leonard)
- Mobile Suit Gundam: Encounters in Space (Lieutenant Yū Kajima)
- Shinseiki Evangelion 2: Evangelions (Ryōji Kaji)

2004

- Kaiketsu Zorori: Mezase! Itazura King (Zorori)
- Kingdom Hearts: Chain of Memories (Donald Duck, Genie, Beast)
- SD Gundam G Generation SEED (Gyunei Guss)
- Super Robot Wars MX (Daisuke Umon, Duke Freed, Hokusen)
- Xenosaga Freaks (Gaignun Kukai, Albedo Piazzolla)
- Xenosaga Episode II: Jenseits von Gut und Böse (Gaignun Kukai, Albedo Piazzolla)

2005

- Cowboy Bebop: Tsuioku no Yakyoku (Spike Spiegel)
- Kingdom Hearts II (Donald Duck, Genie, Sebastian, Beast, Mushu, Stitch)
- Rogue Galaxy (Desert Claw)
- Tales of the World: Narikiri Dungeon 3 (Johnny Sheeden)

2006

- Mobile Suit Gundam: Climax U.C. (Gyunei Guss)
- Neon Genesis Evangelion 2: Tsukarareshi Sekai -another cases- (Ryōji Kaji)
- SD Gundam G Generation PORTABLE (Gyunei Guss)
- Tales of Destiny (PlayStation 2) (Johnny Sheeden)
- Xenosaga Episode III: Also sprach Zarathustra (Gaignun Kukai, Albedo Piazzolla)

2007

- Another Century's Episode 3 (Hokusen, Gyunei Guss)
- Bingo Party Pirates (Chairman)
- Dragon Quest Swords: The Masked Queen and the Tower of Mirrors (Jeimu)
- Final Fantasy IV (Nintendo DS) (Kain Highwind)
- Kingdom Hearts Re:Chain of Memories (Donald Duck, Genie, Mushu)
- Kingdom Hearts II: Final Mix+ (Donald Duck, Genie, Beast, Stitch)
- Mario Kart Arcade GP 2 (Color commentator)
- SD Gundam G Generation SPIRITS (Gyunei Guss, Master Pierce Rayer)
- Secret of Evangelion (Ryōji Kaji)

2008

- Super Smash Bros. Brawl (Mew)

2009

- Bleach DS 4th: Flame Bringer (Higanbana)
- Kingdom Hearts 358/2 Days (Donald Duck)
- Kingdom Hearts coded (Donald Duck)
- SD Gundam G Generation WARS (Gyunei Guss)
- Wii no Ma (Sekai Bikkuri Price narrator)

2010

- Kingdom Hearts Re:coded (Donald Duck)
- Kingdom Hearts Birth by Sleep (Donald Duck, Stitch, Jaq)
- Yakuza 4 (Shun Akiyama)
- The 3rd Birthday (Kyle Madigan)

2011

- Catherine (Vincent Brooks)
- Dissidia 012 Final Fantasy (Kain Highwind)
- FRONTIER GATE (Volker)
- Yakuza: Dead Souls (Shun Akiyama)
- SD Gundam G Generation WORLD (Gyunei Guss)
- Inazuma Eleven Strikers (Otomura Gakuya)
- TERA (Elleon Kubel)
- Kinect Disneyland Adventures (Donald Duck, Beast)

2012

- Binary Domain (Dan Marshall)
- Kingdom Hearts 3D: Dream Drop Distance (Donald Duck)
- Yakuza 5 (Shun Akiyama)

2013

- Disney Magic Castle: My Happy Life (Donald Duck, Beast)
- Kingdom Hearts HD 1.5 Remix (Donald Duck, Genie)
- The Last of Us (Joel (Troy Baker))

2014

- Dragon Ball Z: Battle of Z (Beerus)
- Kingdom Hearts HD 2.5 Remix (Donald Duck, Genie)
- CORE MASTERS (Lord Kamui)
- FREEDOM WARS
- Murdered: Soul Suspect (Ronan O'Connor)
- Ryū ga Gotoku Ishin! (Kido Takayoshi)
- Super Smash Bros. for Nintendo 3DS and Wii U (Mew, Genesect)

2015

- Dragon Ball Xenoverse (Beerus)

2016

- Yakuza 6 (Shun Akiyama)

2016–2017

- New Danganronpa V3 (Monotaro, Monodam, Monosuke, Monokid, Monophanie)

2018

- Dragalia Lost (Midgardsormr)
- Fate/Grand Order (Xiang Yu)
- Dragon Ball FighterZ (Beerus)
- Ryū ga Gotoku ONLINE (Shun Akiyama)
- Super Smash Bros. Ultimate (Mew, Marshadow)

2019

- Kingdom Hearts III (Donald Duck)
- Super Robot Wars T (Spike Spiegel)

2020

- Dragon Ball Z: Kakarot (Beerus)
- Kingdom Hearts III Re+Mind (Donald Duck)
- Kingdom Hearts: Melody of Memory (Donald Duck)

2021

- SINoALICE, (Batman)
- Super Monkey Ball Banana Mania (GonGon, Jam, Dr. Bad-Boon)

2022

- Tower of Fantasy (Franz)

2023

- Like a Dragon: Ishin! (Kido Takayoshi)
- Detective Pikachu Returns (Detective Pikachu)

2024

- Like a Dragon: Infinite Wealth (Shun Akiyama)
- Granblue Fantasy: Relink (Gallanza)
- Final Fantasy VII Rebirth (Dio)

2026

- Marvel Tokon: Fighting Souls (Star-Lord)
- Dissidia Duellum Final Fantasy (Kain Highwind)
- Professor Layton and the New World of Steam (Sheriff Bobsley)

2027

- Kyatto Ninden Teyandee (Karamaru)

TBA

- Kingdom Hearts IV (Donald Duck)

=== Dubbing roles ===
- Eddie Murphy
  - 48 Hrs. (1990 NTV, 1994 TV Asahi and 2017 WOWOW editions) (Reggie Hammond)
  - Trading Places (1995 TV Asahi edition) (Billy Ray Valentine)
  - Beverly Hills Cop (On-demand edition) (Detective Axel Foley)
  - The Golden Child (1992 TV Asahi and on-demand editions) (Chandler Jarrell)
  - Beverly Hills Cop II (1997 TV Asahi and on-demand editions) (Detective Axel Foley)
  - Coming to America (1999 NTV edition) (Prince Akeem Joffer, Clarence, Randy Watson, Saul)
  - Harlem Nights (VHS/DVD edition) (Quick)
  - Another 48 Hrs. (1998 NTV and 2001 TV Asahi editions) (Reggie Hammond)
  - Boomerang (VHS/DVD edition) (Marcus Graham)
  - The Distinguished Gentleman (2000 TV Asahi and VHS/DVD editions) (Thomas Jefferson Johnson)
  - Beverly Hills Cop III (1997 TV Asahi edition) (Detective Axel Foley)
  - The Nutty Professor (2000 NTV edition) (Professor Sherman Klump, Buddy Love, Cletus 'Papa' Marcellus Klump, Anna Pearl 'Mama' Jensen Klump, Ida Mae 'Granny' Jensen, Ernie Klump Senior, Lance Perkins)
  - Metro (Detective Scott Roper)
  - Mulan (Mushu)
  - Dr. Dolittle (2001 NTV edition) (Doctor John Dolittle)
  - Nutty Professor II: The Klumps (2004 Fuji TV edition) (Professor Sherman Klump, Buddy Love, Cletus 'Papa' Marcellus Klump, Young Cletus 'Papa' Marcellus Klump, Anna Pearl 'Mama' Jensen Klump, Ida Mae 'Granny' Jensen, Ernie Klump Senior, Lance Perkins)
  - Dr. Dolittle 2 (2007 TV Asahi edition) (Doctor John Dolittle)
  - Shrek (Donkey)
  - I Spy (Kelly Robinson)
  - Showtime (2006 TV Asahi edition) (Officer Trey Sellars)
  - Daddy Day Care (Charles "Charlie" Hinton)
  - The Haunted Mansion (Jim Evers)
  - Shrek 2 (Donkey)
  - Father of the Pride (Donkey)
  - Dreamgirls (James "Thunder" Early)
  - Norbit (Norbit Albert Rice, Mister Wong, Rasputia Latimore-Rice)
  - Shrek the Halls (Donkey)
  - Shrek the Third (Donkey)
  - Shrek Forever After (Donkey)
  - Scared Shrekless (Donkey)
  - Tower Heist (Slide)
  - A Thousand Words (Jack McCall)
  - Dolemite Is My Name (Rudy Ray Moore)
  - Coming 2 America (Prince Akeem Joffer, Randy Watson)
  - You People (Akbar Mohammed)
  - Candy Cane Lane (Chris Carver)
  - Beverly Hills Cop: Axel F (Axel Foley)
- Jim Carrey
  - Doing Time on Maple Drive (Tim Carter)
  - Dumb and Dumber (VHS edition) (Lloyd Christmas)
  - The Mask (Stanley Ipkiss)
  - Ace Ventura: Pet Detective (2025 BS10 Star Channel edition) (Ace Ventura)
  - Liar Liar (Fletcher Reede)
  - Man on the Moon (Andy Kaufman)
  - How the Grinch Stole Christmas (The Grinch)
  - Bruce Almighty (Bruce Nolan)
  - Lemony Snicket's A Series of Unfortunate Events (Count Olaf)
  - Fun with Dick and Jane (Dick Harper)
  - The Number 23 (Walter Sparrow / Fingerling)
  - Yes Man (Carl Allen)
  - A Christmas Carol (Ebenezer Scrooge, Ghost of Christmas Past, Ghost of Christmas Present)
  - Mr. Popper's Penguins (Tom Popper)
  - Kick-Ass 2 (Colonel Stars and Stripes)
  - Dumb and Dumber To (Lloyd Christmas)
  - Sonic the Hedgehog (Dr. Ivo Robotnik)
  - Sonic the Hedgehog 2 (Dr. Ivo Robotnik)
  - Sonic the Hedgehog 3 (Dr. Ivo Robotnik, Professor Gerald Robotnik)
- Brad Pitt
  - Kalifornia (Early Grayce)
  - Seven Years in Tibet (Heinrich Harrer)
  - Fight Club (Tyler Durden)
  - The Mexican (Jerry Welbach)
  - Spy Game (DVD edition) (Tom Bishop)
  - Troy (2007 TV Asahi edition) (Achilles)
  - Mr. & Mrs. Smith (DVD and 2010 TV Asahi editions) (John Smith)
  - The Curious Case of Benjamin Button (Benjamin Button)
  - Inglourious Basterds (Lieutenant Aldo Raine)
  - Killing Them Softly (Jackie Cogan)
  - The Counselor (Westray)
  - By the Sea (Roland)
  - Ad Astra (Roy McBride)
- Jean-Claude Van Damme
  - Double Impact (1997 TV Asahi edition) (Alex Wagner / Chad Wagner)
  - Universal Soldier (1995 TV Asahi edition) (Private Luc Deveraux)
  - Nowhere to Run (1996 TV Asahi edition) (Sam Gillen)
  - Timecop (1996 TV Asahi edition) (Max Walker)
  - Sudden Death (1999 TV Asahi edition) (Darren McCord)
  - Maximum Risk (2000 TV Asahi edition) (Alain Moreau / Mikhail Suverov)
  - Double Team (2000 TV Asahi edition) (Jack Paul Quinn)
  - Knock Off (2001 TV Tokyo edition) (Marcus Ray)
  - Legionnaire (2004 TV Tokyo edition) (Alain Lefevre)
  - Inferno (2002 TV Tokyo edition) (Eddie Lomax)
  - Replicant (2005 TV Tokyo edition) (Edward "The Torch" Garrotte, Replicant)
  - The Expendables 2 (Jean Vilain)
- Chris Pratt
  - Guardians of the Galaxy (Star-Lord)
  - Jurassic World (2025 The Cinema edition) (Owen Grady)
  - Guardians of the Galaxy Vol. 2 (Star-Lord)
  - Avengers: Infinity War (Star-Lord)
  - Jurassic World: Fallen Kingdom (2025 The Cinema edition) (Owen Grady)
  - Avengers: Endgame (Star-Lord)
  - The Tomorrow War (James Daniel Forester Jr.)
  - Thor: Love and Thunder (Star-Lord)
  - Jurassic World Dominion (2025 The Cinema edition) (Owen Grady)
  - The Guardians of the Galaxy Holiday Special (Star-Lord)
  - Guardians of the Galaxy Vol. 3 (Star-Lord)
  - Mercy (Det. Chris Raven)
- Charlie Sheen
  - The Wraith (1992 TV Asahi edition) (Jake Kesey)
  - Wall Street (1992 TV Asahi edition) (Bud Fox)
  - The Rookie (1993 TBS edition) (David Ackerman)
  - Hot Shots! (VHS/DVD edition) (Lieutenant Topper Harley)
  - Beyond the Law (VHS edition) (Daniel "Dan" Saxon)
  - Hot Shots! Part Deux (VHS/DVD edition) (Topper Harley)
  - The Three Musketeers (VHS/DVD edition) (Aramis)
  - Terminal Velocity (VHS/DVD edition) (Richard "Ditch" Brodie)
  - Bad Day on the Block (VHS edition) (Lyle Wilder)
- Robin Williams
  - Aladdin (Genie)
  - Mrs. Doubtfire (Daniel Hillard / Misses Euphegenia Doubtfire) (VHS/DVD and 1997 TV Asahi editions)
  - Aladdin and the King of Thieves (Genie)
  - Jack (VHS/DVD edition) (Jack Powell)
  - Father's Day (VHS/DVD edition) (Dale)
  - Flubber (VHS/DVD edition) (Professor Philip Brainard)
  - Robots (Fender Pinwheeler)
  - Happy Feet Two (Ramón, Lovelace)
- Will Ferrell
  - Bewitched (Jack)
  - Curious George (Ted (The Man with the Yellow Hat))
  - Stranger than Fiction (Harold Crick)
  - Talladega Nights: The Ballad of Ricky Bobby (Ricky Bobby)
  - Step Brothers (Brennan Huff)
  - Megamind (Megamind)
  - The Lego Movie (Lord Business, The Man Upstairs)
  - The Lego Movie 2: The Second Part (President Business, The Man Upstairs, Narrator)
- Michael Keaton
  - Gung Ho (Hunt Stevenson)
  - Batman (1995 TV Asahi edition) (Batman)
  - Batman Returns (1994 TV Asahi edition) (Batman)
  - My Life (1996 NTV edition) (Bob Jones)
  - Jackie Brown (Ray Nicolette)
  - The Founder (2019 BS TV Tokyo edition) (Ray Kroc)
  - The Flash (Batman)
  - Beetlejuice Beetlejuice (Beetlejuice)
- Michael J. Fox
  - Back to the Future (VHS/DVD edition) (Marty McFly)
  - The Secret of My Succe$s (1992 TBS edition) (Brantley Foster/Carlton Whitfield)
  - Back to the Future Part II (VHS/DVD edition) (Marty McFly, Marty McFly Junior, Marlene McFly)
  - Back to the Future Part III (VHS/DVD edition) (Marty McFly, Seamus McFly)
  - Doc Hollywood (VHS/DVD edition) (Doctor Benjamin Stone)
  - The Hard Way (VHS/DVD edition) (Nick Lang, Ray Casanov)
  - Life with Mikey (VHS/DVD edition) (Michael "Mikey" Chapman)
- Tom Hanks
  - The 'Burbs (1992 TV Asahi edition) (Ray Peterson)
  - Turner & Hooch (1993 TBS edition) (Detective Scott Turner)
  - Sleepless in Seattle (VHS/DVD edition) (Sam Baldwin)
  - Forrest Gump (1998 NTV edition) (Forrest Gump)
  - Apollo 13 (1999 NTV edition) (Jim Lovell)
  - That Thing You Do! (Mister White)
  - Saving Private Ryan (2002 TV Asahi edition) (Captain John H. Miller)
- Chris Tucker
  - The Fifth Element (VHS/old DVD and 1999 NTV editions) (Ruby Rhod)
  - Money Talks (Franklin Hatchett)
  - Rush Hour (Detective James Carter)
  - Rush Hour 2 (Detective James Carter)
  - Rush Hour 3 (Detective James Carter)
  - Billy Lynn's Long Halftime Walk (Albert)
  - Air (Howard White)
- Will Smith
  - Independence Day (VHS/DVD/Blu-ray and 1999 TV Asahi editions) (Captain Steve Hiller)
  - I, Robot (DVD edition) (Detective Del Spooner)
  - I Am Legend (2010 TV Asahi edition) (Lieutenant Colonel Robert Neville)
  - Aladdin (Genie)
  - Gemini Man (Junior)
  - One Strange Rock (2019 NHK edition) (Himself)
- Jon Hamm
  - Mad Men (Don Draper)
  - A Young Doctor's Notebook (Older Doctor)
  - Bad Times at the El Royale (Dwight Broadbeck / 'Laramie' Seymour Sullivan)
  - Beirut (Mason Skiles)
  - Good Omens (Gabriel)
  - Between Two Ferns: The Movie (Jon Hamm)
- Wesley Snipes
  - Major League (1991 NTV edition) (Willie "Mays" Hayes)
  - New Jack City (Nino Brown)
  - Passenger 57 (John Cutter)
  - White Men Can't Jump (Sidney "Syd" Deane)
  - Rising Sun (Lieutenant Webster "Web" Smith)
  - The Fan (Bobby Rayburn)
- Denzel Washington
  - Cry Freedom (1994 NTV edition) (Steve Biko)
  - Malcolm X (VHS/DVD edition) (Malcolm X)
  - Crimson Tide (1998 NTV edition) (Lieutenant Commander Ron Hunter)
  - Devil in a Blue Dress (Easy Rawlins)
  - The Hurricane (2004 TV Asahi edition) (Rubin Carter)
- Mike Myers
  - Wayne's World (Wayne Campbell)
  - Wayne's World 2 (Wayne Campbell)
  - Austin Powers: International Man of Mystery (Austin Powers, Doctor Evil)
  - Austin Powers: The Spy Who Shagged Me (Austin Powers, Doctor Evil, Fat Bastard)
  - Austin Powers in Goldmember (Austin Powers, Doctor Evil, Fat Bastard, Goldmember)
- Tom Cruise
  - Rain Man (1994 TBS edition) (Charlie Babbitt)
  - Born on the Fourth of July (1993 TV Asahi edition) (Ron Kovic)
  - Jerry Maguire (VHS/DVD edition) (Jerry Maguire)
  - Magnolia (Frank Mackey)
  - Austin Powers in Goldmember (Tom Cruise / Famous Austin)
- Woody Harrelson
  - Money Train (2000 Fuji TV edition) (Charlie)
  - The Hunger Games (Haymitch Abernathy)
  - The Hunger Games: Catching Fire (Haymitch Abernathy)
  - The Hunger Games: Mockingjay – Part 1 (Haymitch Abernathy)
  - The Hunger Games: Mockingjay – Part 2 (Haymitch Abernathy)
- Martin Lawrence
  - Bad Boys (Marcus Burnett)
  - Bad Boys II (Marcus Burnett)
  - National Security (Earl Montgomery)
  - Bad Boys for Life (Marcus Burnett)
  - Bad Boys: Ride or Die (Marcus Burnett)
- Charlie Chaplin
  - The Fireman (2014 Star Channel edition) (The Fireman)
  - One A.M. (2014 Star Channel edition) (Drunk)
  - The Adventurer (2014 Star Channel edition) (The Convict)
  - The Great Dictator (2016 Blu-Ray edition) (Adenoid Hynkel, A Jewish Barber)
- Gary Oldman
  - Romeo Is Bleeding (1996 TV Asahi edition) (Jack Grimaldi)
  - Léon: The Professional (2009 Blu-Ray edition) (Norman "Stan" Stansfield)
  - Murder in the First (Milton Glenn)
  - The Fifth Element (VHS/DVD/Blu-ray editions) (Jean-Baptiste Emanuel Zorg)
- John Travolta
  - Look Who's Talking (1992 NTV edition) (James Ubriacco)
  - Look Who's Talking Too (TV edition) (James Ubriacco)
  - Look Who's Talking Now (TV edition) (James Ubriacco)
  - Hairspray (Edna Turnblad)
- Mel Gibson
  - Mad Max 2 (1997 TV Asahi edition) (Max Rockatansky)
  - Forever Young (1998 TV Asahi edition) (Daniel McCormick)
  - Braveheart (1999 TV Asahi edition) (William Wallace)
  - Conspiracy Theory (2000 TV Asahi edition) (Jerry Fletcher)
- Christopher Lloyd
  - Back to the Future (2014 BS Japan/2025 NTV edition) (Dr. Emmett "Doc" Brown)
  - Back to the Future Part II (2018 BS Japan/2025 NTV edition) (Dr. Emmett "Doc" Brown)
  - Back to the Future Part III (2018 BS Japan/2025 NTV edition) (Dr. Emmett "Doc" Brown)
- Keanu Reeves
  - Speed (VHS/DVD edition) (Officer Jack Traven)
  - A Walk in the Clouds (Sergeant Paul Sutton)
  - Chain Reaction (Eddie Kasalivich)
- Matt Dillon
  - Rebel (TV edition) (Rebel)
  - Mr. Wonderful (Gus)
  - Beautiful Girls (Tommy 'Birdman' Rowland)
- Matthew Modine
  - Memphis Belle (VHS edition) (Dennis Dearborn)
  - Pacific Heights (VHS edition) (Drake Goodman)
  - Equinox (Henry Petosa / Freddy Ace)
- Stephen Chow
  - Shaolin Soccer ("Mighty Steel Leg" Sing)
  - Kung Fu Hustle (Sing)
  - CJ7 (Chow Ti)
- Steve Buscemi
  - Spy Kids 2: The Island of Lost Dreams (Romero)
  - Spy Kids 3-D: Game Over (Romero)
  - Charlotte's Web (Templeton the Rat)
- Val Kilmer
  - Top Secret! (1990 TV Asahi edition) (Nick Rivers)
  - The Doors (Jim Morrison)
  - At First Sight (Virgil Adamson)
- Idris Elba
  - Hobbs & Shaw (Brixton Lore)
  - Cats (Macavity)
  - The Suicide Squad (Robert DuBois / Bloodsport)
- Martin Short
  - Pure Luck (Eugene Proctor)
  - Captain Ron (Martin Harvey)
  - Only Murders in the Building (Oliver Putnam)

==== American Live-action films ====
- 8 Million Ways to Die (Angel Moldonado (Andy García))
- The Adventures of Sharkboy and Lavagirl in 3-D (Mister Electric, Mister Electridad, Tobor, Ice Guardian (George Lopez))
- Air America (1992 NTV edition) (Billy Covington (Robert Downey Jr.))
- Avalon (Stunner (Bartłomiej Świderski))
- Back in the USSR (VHS edition) (Archer (Frank Whaley))
- The Bible: In the Beginning... (1994 TV Asahi edition) (The Three Angels (Peter O'Toole))
- Bill & Ted's Excellent Adventure (Billy the Kid (Dan Shor))
- Blue Velvet (Jeffrey Beaumont (Kyle MacLachlan))
- Bonnie & Clyde: The True Story (Clyde Barrow (Dana Ashbrook))
- Borat (Borat Sagdiyev (Sacha Baron Cohen))
- Born to Ride (Cpl. Grady Westfall (John Stamos))
- Bowling for Columbine (2004 TV Tokyo edition) (Michael Moore)
- Bulworth (Senator Jay Billington Bulworth (Warren Beatty))
- Cat People (1992 TV Asahi edition) (Oliver Yates (John Heard))
- Chaplin (Charlie Chaplin (Robert Downey Jr.))
- Close Encounters of the Third Kind (1999 TV Asahi edition) (Roy Neary (Richard Dreyfuss))
- Closer (Larry Gray (Clive Owen))
- Coming to America (DVD edition) (Semmi, Morris, Reverend Brown, Ugly Girl (Arsenio Hall))
- Confessions of a Dangerous Mind (Chuck Barris (Sam Rockwell))
- The Cop Baby (Major Chromov (Sergei Garmash))
- Creator (TV edition) (Boris Lafkin (Vincent Spano))
- The Dark Half (Thad Beaumont, George Stark (Timothy Hutton))
- Date with an Angel (Jim Sanders (Michael E. Knight))
- Dead Poets Society (Knox Overstreet (Josh Charles))
- Deceived (Jack Sauders (John Heard))
- Dodgeball: A True Underdog Story (White Goodman (Ben Stiller))
- Dying Young (Victor Gettes (Campbell Scott))
- The Empire Strikes Back (1992 TV Asahi edition) (Han Solo (Harrison Ford))
- Everest (Scott Fischer (Jake Gyllenhaal))
- Evolution (2005 NTV edition) (Professor Harry Phineas Block (Orlando Jones))
- Ferrari (Enzo Ferrari (Adam Driver))
- The Fisher King (Homeless cabaret singer (Michael Jeter))
- The Fly II (VHS/DVD edition) (Martin Brundle (Eric Stoltz))
- Gangster Wars (Michael Lasker (Brian Benben))
- Ghost in the Shell (Togusa (Chin Han))
- Gladiator II (Marcus Acacius (Pedro Pascal))
- The Godfather Saga (Michael Corleone (Al Pacino))
- The Green Hornet (Britt Reid/Green Hornet (Seth Rogen))
- The Green Mile (2002 Fuji TV edition) (Percy Wetmore (Doug Hutchison))
- Gremlins 2: The New Batch (VHS/DVD edition) (Daniel Clamp (John Glover))
- Greystoke: The Legend of Tarzan, Lord of the Apes (1989 TBS edition) (Tarzan (Christopher Lambert))
- The Grifters (Roy Dillon (John Cusack))
- Hard Boiled (VHS/DVD edition) (Alan (Tony Leung Chiu-wai))
- He Said, She Said (Dan Hanson (Kevin Bacon))
- Heaven's Prisoners (VHS edition) (Dave Robicheaux (Alec Baldwin))
- Hit List (Frank DeSalvo (Leo Rossi))
- Home Alone 2: Lost in New York (1996 TV Asahi edition) (Marv Merchants (Daniel Stern))
- Hong Kong Godfather (York Koo (Andy Lau))
- I Now Pronounce You Chuck and Larry (Charles Todd "Chuck" Levine (Adam Sandler))
- Iron Eagle II (Balyonev (Mark Ivanir))
- Iron Man (2011 TV Asahi edition) (Lieutenant Colonel James Rupert "Rhodey" Rhodes (Terrence Howard))
- Iron Man 2 (2012 TV Asahi edition) (Lieutenant Colonel James Rupert "Rhodey" Rhodes (Don Cheadle))
- Jack's Back (TV Tokyo edition) (John and Rick Westford (James Spader))
- Jacob's Ladder (Jacob Singer (Tim Robbins))
- Jerry Maguire (2000 NTV edition) (Rod Tidwell (Cuba Gooding Jr.))
- Journey to the West: Conquering the Demons (Sun Wukong (Huang Bo))
- Journey to the West: The Demons Strike Back (Sun Wukong (Lin Gengxin))
- Kingpin (Ishmael Boorg (Randy Quaid))
- A Knight's Tale (2006 NTV edition) (Geoffrey Chaucer (Paul Bettany))
- Kung Fu Soccer (Little Sun (Dicky Cheung))
- The Last Hour (Lombardi (Bobby Di Cicco))
- Land of the Dead (Anchor (Tony Munch))
- The Last Boy Scout (VHS/DVD edition) (Jimmy Dix (Damon Wayans))
- Lawrence of Arabia (2000 TV Tokyo edition) (T. E. Lawrence (Peter O'Toole))
- Leaving Las Vegas (Ben Sanderson (Nicolas Cage))
- Legend of the Demon Cat (Old Dan Long (Cheng Taisheng))
- Licence to Kill (1999 TV Asahi edition) (James Bond (Timothy Dalton))
- Life Is Beautiful (2001 TV Asahi edition) (Guido Orefice (Roberto Benigni))
- Lilo & Stitch (2025) (Stitch)
- The Little Witch (Abraxas (Axel Prahl))
- The Lord of the Rings: The Two Towers (Éomer (Karl Urban))
- The Lord of the Rings: The Return of the King (Éomer (Karl Urban))
- Lunarcop (VHS edition) (Joe Brody (Michael Paré))
- The Magnificent Seven (2013 Star Channel edition) (Vin Tanner (Steve McQueen))
- A Man Apart (2007 TV Tokyo edition) (DEA Agent Sean Vetter (Vin Diesel))
- The Mandalorian and Grogu – Hugo (Martin Scorsese)
- Mary Poppins (DVD edition) (Bert, Mister Dawes Senior (Dick Van Dyke))
- The Messenger: The Story of Joan of Arc (2002 NTV edition) (Charles VII of France (John Malkovich))
- A Minecraft Movie (Steve (Jack Black))
- The Muppet Christmas Carol (Bob Cratchit (Kermit the Frog) (Steve Whitmire), Schoolmaster (Sam Eagle) (Frank Oz), Peter Cratchit (David Rudman))
- Muppet Treasure Island (Captain Abraham Smollett (Kermit the Frog) (Steve Whitmire), Mr. Samuel Arrow (Sam Eagle) (Frank Oz))
- My Blue Heaven (Barney Coopersmith (Rick Moranis))
- Nicky Larson and Cupid's Perfume (Nicky Larson (Philippe Lacheau))
- Night Eyes (Will Griffith (Andrew Stevens))
- Night Watch (Mike Graham (Pierce Brosnan))
- Once Upon a Time in America (VHS edition) (Jimmy O'Donnell (Treat Williams))
- One Fine Day (VHS/DVD edition) (Jack Taylor (George Clooney))
- Organized Crime and Triad Bureau (Inspector San Lee (Danny Lee Sau-Yin))
- Over the Top (Netflix edition) (Lincoln Hawk (Sylvester Stallone))
- Parenthood (VHS edition) (Nathan Huffner (Rick Moranis))
- Pet Sematary (Victor Pascow (Brad Greenquist))
- Phenomena (2020 Blu-Ray edition) (Inspector Rudolf Geiger (Patrick Bauchau))
- The Philadelphia Experiment (1991 TV Asahi edition) (David Herdeg (Michael Paré))
- Pixels (Max Headroom (Matt Frewer))
- Prelude to a Kiss (Peter Hoskins (Alec Baldwin))
- Pretty Woman (1997 TV Asahi edition) (Edward Lewis (Richard Gere))
- Pulp Fiction (Butch Coolidge (Bruce Willis))
- Racing Stripes (Nolan Walsh (Bruce Greenwood))
- Ready Player One (Ogden Morrow (Simon Pegg))
- Red Cliff (Zhou Yu (Tony Leung Chiu-Wai))
- Reservoir Dogs (K-Billy DJ (Steven Wright))
- Return of the Living Dead Part II (Tom Essex (Dana Ashbrook))
- A River Runs Through It (Norman Maclean (Craig Sheffer))
- The Rock (2000 TV Asahi edition) (Doctor Stanley Goodspeed (Nicolas Cage))
- The Rocketeer (VHS/DVD edition) (Cliff Secord (Billy Campbell))
- Roman Holiday (1994 VHS edition) (Mario Delani (Paolo Carlini))
- Rome Adventure (Don Porter (Troy Donahue))
- The Running Man (Bobby "Bobby T" Thompson (Colman Domingo))
- School Ties (David Greene (Brendan Fraser))
- Shakedown (TV Asahi edition) (Roland Dalton (Peter Weller))
- Shane (2016 Star Channel edition) (Shane (Alan Ladd))
- Shine (David Helfgott (Geoffrey Rush))
- Single White Female (VHS/DVD edition) (Sam Rawson (Steven Weber))
- The Smurfs (Gargamel (Hank Azaria))
- The Smurfs 2 (Gargamel (Hank Azaria))
- Solaris (Chris Kelvin (George Clooney))
- Space Jam (Michael Jordan)
- Star Trek III: The Search for Spock (1988 NTV edition) (David Marcus (Merritt Butrick))
- The Sting (1991 TV Asahi edition) (Johnny Hooker (Robert Redford))
- Storm of the Century (Mike Anderson (Tim Daly))
- The Sum of All Fears (2004 Fuji TV edition) (Jack Ryan (Ben Affleck))
- Sylvanian Families (Kurumirisu's father)
- Tarzan in Manhattan (Tarzan (Joe Lara))
- The Thieves (Macao Park (Kim Yoon-seok))
- Thirteen Days (2003 TV Asahi edition) (John F. Kennedy (Bruce Greenwood))
- Three Men and a Little Lady (VHS/DVD edition) (Michael Kellam (Steve Guttenberg))
- Threesome (Stuart (Stephen Baldwin))
- A Time to Kill (VHS/DVD edition) (Jake Brigance (Matthew McConaughey))
- Titanic (VHS/DVD edition) (Caledon Hockley (Billy Zane))
- Tony Arzenta (New Japan Film edition) (Tony Arzenta (Alain Delon))
- Tootsie (DVD edition) (Michael Dorsey (Dustin Hoffman))
- Transformers: Age of Extinction (Bumblebee)
- True Romance (TV edition) (Clarence Worley (Christian Slater))
- U-571 (2004 TV Asahi edition) (Lieutenant Andrew Tyler (Matthew McConaughey))
- Unbreakable (2005 TV Tokyo edition) (Elijah Price (Samuel L. Jackson))
- Under Siege 2: Dark Territory (Travis Dane (Eric Bogosian))
- The Untouchables (1998 TV Asahi edition) (Eliot Ness (Kevin Costner))
- Van Helsing (2007 TV Asahi edition) (Gabriel Van Helsing (Hugh Jackman))
- West Side Story (1990 TBS edition) (Bernardo (George Chakiris))
- What's Love Got to Do with It (Ike Turner (Laurence Fishburne))
- Wicked (Dr. Dillamond (Peter Dinklage))
- Who Framed Roger Rabbit (Roger Rabbit)
- Young Guns II (VHS edition) (Billy the Kid (Emilio Estevez))
- Young Sherlock Holmes (1988 Fuji TV edition) (Sherlock Holmes (Nicholas Rowe))

==== Television ====
- Ally McBeal (Judge Dennis 'Happy' Boyle (Phil Leeds), Wilson Jade (Bobby Cannavale))
- Band of Brothers (Captain Lewis Nixon (Ron Livingston))
- Blindspot (Kurt Weller (Sullivan Stapleton))
- The Cape (Vince Farraday/The Cape (David Lyons))
- Columbo ("Columbo Goes to College") (Cooper Redman (Gary Hershberger))
- Cowboy Bebop (Spike Spiegel (John Cho))
- Dark Angel (TV Asahi edition) (Logan "Eyes Only" Cale (Michael Weatherly))
- The Flash (Flash (John Wesley Shipp))
- Full House (Joey Gladstone (Dave Coulier))
- Fuller House (Joey Gladstone (Dave Coulier))
- The Gangster Chronicles (Michael Lasker (Brian Benben))
- House of Cards (Garrett Walker (Michel Gill))
- The Last of Us (Joel (Pedro Pascal))
- Max Headroom (Max Headroom (Matt Frewer))
- Perry Mason (Chris Fulmer (Don Reilly))
- Quantum Leap (Bob Thompson (Kevin Spirtas))
- Red Dwarf (Cat (Danny John-Jules), Stalin (Callum Coates))
- Road to Avonlea (Jonathan Ravenhurst Blackwell (Robby Benson))
- Super Force (Zachary Stone (Ken Olandt))
- Tequila and Bonetti (Chad Rydell (John D'Aquino))
- The Young Indiana Jones Chronicles (T. E. Lawrence (Douglas Henshall))

==== Animation ====
- The Angry Birds Movie (Mighty Eagle)
- The Angry Birds Movie 2 (Mighty Eagle)
- Beauty and the Beast (Beast)
- Beauty and the Beast: The Enchanted Christmas (Beast)
- Belle's Magical World (Beast)
- The Boss Baby (Francis E. Francis)
- Chip 'n Dale: Rescue Rangers (DJ Herzogenaurach)
- Cinderella II: Dreams Come True (Jaq)
- Cinderella III: A Twist in Time (Jaq)
- Curious George 2: Follow That Monkey! (Ted (The Man with the Yellow Hat))
- DC League of Super-Pets (Batman)
- Despicable Me (Vector)
- Despicable Me 2 (Floyd Eagle-san)
- Despicable Me 3 (Fritz)
- Early Man (Brian and Bryan)
- Help! I'm a Fish (Professor MacKrill)
- Hop (E.B.)
- Hotel Transylvania (Dracula)
- Hotel Transylvania 2 (Dracula)
- Hotel Transylvania 3: Summer Vacation (Dracula)
- Hotel Transylvania: Transformania (Dracula)
- Ice Age (Manny)
- Ice Age: The Meltdown (Manny)
- Ice Age: Dawn of the Dinosaurs (Manny)
- Ice Age: A Mammoth Christmas (Manny)
- Ice Age: Continental Drift (Manny)
- Ice Age: Collision Course (Manny)
- The Ice Age Adventures of Buck Wild (Manny)
- The Lego Movie (Batman)
- The Lego Batman Movie (Batman)
- The Lego Movie 2: The Second Part (Batman)
- The Lego Ninjago Movie (Lord Garmadon)
- Lilo & Stitch (Stitch)
- The Little Mermaid II: Return to the Sea (Sebastian)
- The Little Mermaid: Ariel's Beginning (Sebastian)
- The Lorax (Mayor O'Hare)
- The Lord of the Rings: The War of the Rohirrim (General Targg)
- Madagascar: Escape 2 Africa (Moto Moto)
- Minions & Monsters (Goomi)
- Mulan II (Mushu)
- The Return of Jafar (Genie)
- The Secret Life of Pets (Ozone)
- Sing (Mike)
- Sing 2 (Klaus Kickenklober)
- Smurfs (Gargamel, Razamel)
- Wreck-It Ralph (Ralph)
- Ralph Breaks the Internet (Ralph)
- Wish (Valentino)

=== Puppetry ===
- The Three Musketeers (Athos, Planchet, Rochefort, Louis XIII, Patrick and Duke of Orléans)
- Sherlock Holmes (Sherlock Holmes, Mycroft Holmes)

=== Television drama ===
- Aikotoba wa Yūki (2000) (Chikō Keno)
- Natsuzora: Natsu's Sky (2019) (Yūsei Toyotomi)
- Welcome Home, Monet (2021) (Katsutoshi Endō)
- The 13 Lords of the Shogun (2022) (Jien)
- Anpan (2025) (Haruto Zama)

Unknown date

- Doyō Drama: Shanhai Typhoon
- The Fantastic Deer-Man (Deer (voice))
- Half Blue Sky (Doctor)
- Hikeshi Ya Komachi (Higashi Mama)
- Jyoshiana Icchokusen!
- Kiteretsu Daihyakka (Kiteretsu's father)
- Koeharu! (Genmai Odawara)
- Koinu no Waltz (Katsuyuki Imai)
- Psycho Doctor (Chikaraishi)
- The Way of the Househusband (Narrator (episode 9))
- Yoishyo no Otoko (Shinya Matsunaga, Narrator)

=== Live-action films ===
- Talking Head (1992), Ōtsuka
- Godzilla vs. Megaguirus: G Extermination Strategy (2000), Yama-chan
- Minna no Ie (2001), Kikuma Aonuma
- Godzilla, Mothra and King Ghidorah: Giant Monsters All-Out Attack (2001), TV producer
- Godzilla: Final Wars (2004), narrator
- The Uchōten Hotel (2006), Dabudabu the Duck (voice)
- 20th Century Boys Chapter 2: Saigo Kibō (2009), Konchi (Yūichi Konno)
- Yatterman (2009), Narration, Yatter-Wan (voice), Odatebuta (voice)
- A Ghost of a Chance (2014), various voices
- Galaxy Turnpike (2015), various voices
- Gintama (2017), Shoyo Yoshida (voice)
- Hit Me Anyone One More Time (2019), various voices
- Akira and Akira (2022)
- Shin Ultraman (2022), Zōffy (voice)
- Sono Koe no Anata e (2022), himself

=== Tokusatsu ===
- Ultraman G (Lloyd Wilder (Dub))
- Bakuryū Sentai Abaranger (Densuke Hamazaki)
- Zyuden Sentai Kyoryuger vs. Go-Busters: The Great Dinosaur Battle! Farewell Our Eternal Friends (Tyrannosaurus/Zyudenryu Gabutyra)
- Ultraman Orb The Movie (Alien Gapia Sadeath)
- Kamen Rider Zero-One (Narration)
- Kamen Rider Gavv the Movie: Invaders of the House of Snacks (Zeztz Driver (Voice))
- Kamen Rider ZEZTZ (Zeztz Driver (Voice), Zeztz Darkness Nightmare)

=== Variety shows ===
- D no Gekijō ~Unmei no Judge~ (Narrator)
- Down Town DX (Guest appearance)
- Mecha-Mecha Iketeru! ("Bakuretsu Otō-chan" guest)
- Mirai Sōzō Dō (Narrator)
- Monomane Battle (Master of Ceremonies, Louis Armstrong, Hiroto Kōmoto, Yutaka Ozaki, Scatman John, Kōji Tamaki, Stevie Wonder, Masayoshi Yamazaki)
- Monomane Grand Prix (Scatman John, Yūsaka Kimura and Louis Armstrong)
- Oha Suta (Main host, as "Yama-chan")
- Seiyū Club (Host)
- Shall We Dance?
- SmaSTATION!! (Guest appearance)
- Takeshi: Tokoro no WA Fu Kita! (Host)

=== Radio ===
- BAY LINE 7300 (Bay FM)
- Emerald Dragon (radio drama) (Yaman) (Nippon Cultural Broadcasting)
- Hyper Night Monday (April 1994 – March 1995) (Kyoto Broadcasting System)
- Kōichi Yamadera no Gap System (Tokai Radio Broadcasting, Osaka Broadcasting Corporation, Aomori Broadcasting Corporation)
- OHA-OHA NIGHT (Nippon Broadcasting System)

=== CDs ===
- Breath
- Gap System Menthol
- Gap System Super Light
- Glay ("Giant Strong Faust Super Star") (Doctor Moog)

==== Drama CDs ====
- Allison & Lillia Drama CD I ~Allison to Vil: Another Story~ (Carr Benedict)
- Bourbon no Fūin (Adrian Maurice)
- Combination (Shigemitsu Hashiba)
- Gaia Gear (Messar Metto)
- Koi no Shinsatsushitsu 1 & 2 (Ryuuichi Kuronuma)
- Mō itori no Marionette (Masayuki Jin)
- Monster Maker: Maken Desuderibā wo Sagase! (Marion)
- Ōto Ayakashi Kitan (Masayuki Fujiwara)
- Saint Seiya (Cancer Deathmask)
- Saiyuki (Sha Gojyo)
- Shiowase no Katachi: Suishō no Namera Nezumi (Koitsu)
- Sound Picture Box: Mewtwo no Tanjyō (Mew)
- Special Duty Combat Unit Shinesman (Shogo Yamadera/Shinesman Gray)
- Western Antique Cake-Shop (Keīchirō Tachibana)
- X Character File 1: Yuzuriha & Sorata (Sorata Arisugawa)
- Xenosaga: Outer File (Gaignun Kukai)

==== Singles ====
- GLORY DAYS, (1992)
- Tsukareta, (1996)
- Jabba Jabba Morning/OHA OHA Starter (with Raymond), (1998)
- Tensai Bakabon no Kuku ha Korediinoda!!, (1999)
- Utau, (2000)
- Hustle (Kaiketsu Zorori Opening Theme), (2004)
- Ajyapā (with Rikako Aikawa and Motoko Kumai) (Majime ni Fumajime Kaiketsu Zorori First Opening Theme), (2005)
- Zekkōchō, (Majime ni Fumajime Kaiketsu Zorori Second Opening Theme), (2006)
- Sākuru Obu raifu (The Lion King Opening Theme)

==== Other ====
- December 17, 1993 Aladdin Original Motion Picture Soundtrack (Japanese Version)
  "Friend Like Me"
  "Ali Ōji no Tōri"
- March 18, 2000 Ashita Ninattara... (Donkey Kong Country opening and ending)
  "Ashita Ninattara..." (Donkey (Kōichi Yamadera) and Diddy (Megumi Hayashibara))
  "Banana Tengoku" (Donkey (Kōichi Yamadera) and Diddy (Megumi Hayashibara))
- March 10, 2004 Tōkyō Disneyland: Feel the Magic
  "Friend Like Me"
  "Hitoribocchi no Bansankai"
- March 24, 2004 Hustle (Kaiketsu Zorori opening)
  Hustle
- January 25, 2006 Kingdom Hearts II Original Soundtrack
  "Swim This Way" (Disc 2, Track 3)
  "Under the Sea" (Disc 2, Track 5)
  "A New Day Is Dawning" (Disc 2, Track 7)

=== Commercials ===
- Anrakutei (Father, Narrator)
- House Foods (Kokumaro Curry Stew)
- Kirin Freezing Chūhai (Narration)
- Kōwa (Narration)
- McDonald's (2000, voice) (Ronald McDonald)
- Pokémon film series (Narration)
- Sonic Adventure (Narration)
- South Park: Bigger, Longer & Uncut (Narration)
- Toyota Ractis (Narration)
- Confessions (Narration)
- The Intouchables (Narration)
- Pixels (Narration)
- Kirby 64: The Crystal Shards (Narration)
- Donkey Kong Country Returns 3D (Narration)
- Rockman 5: Blues's Trap!? (Narration)
- Dragon Quest VIII (Narration)

=== Other ===
- Anime Giga (NHK BS2) first guest
- M-1 Grand Prix 2002 (December 29, 2002, Yoshimoto Kōgyō) (Main chairman)
- Sky A Sports Plus name announcer
- Disney Channel name announcer
- Tokyo Disneyland "Disney's Halloween" (2003–2007) (Narrator)
