= Pierre Chaulet =

French-Algerian doctor (1930–2012)

- Pierre Chaulet at the Algiers Book Fair
- Born: 27 March 1930; Algiers, Algeria
- Died: 5 October 2012 (aged 82); Montpellier, France
- Education: University of Algiers
- Occupations: freedom fighter, doctor
- Organization: National Liberation Front (FLN)
- Spouse: Claudine Chaulet

Pierre Chaulet (27 March 1930– 5 October 2012) was a French-Algerian doctor and National Liberation Front (FLN) militant during the Algerian War. He was instrumental in Algeria's successful campaign to eradicate tuberculosis.

== Early life and education ==
Chaulet was born in Algiers on March 27, 1930. His father was Alexandre Chaulet, a Catholic labor organizer who founded Algeria's first section of the French Confederation of Christian Workers (CFTC). As a teenager, he visited the slums of Algiers and witnessed the negative impacts of tuberculosis. Later, he studied medicine at Algiers University, specializing in phthisiology.

In 1952, Pierre Chaulet co-founded the Association de la jeunesse alge ́rienne pour l’action sociale (Association of Algerian Youth for Social Action or AJAAS). The group provided aid to Algerians and provided a forum for dialogue between Europeans and Algerians. Many Christian members became supportive of Algerian independence because of their participation in AJAAS.

Additionally, he was involved with Consciences Maghrébiennes, an anti-colonial newspaper.

== Algerian War of Independence ==
Chaulet and his wife, Claudine, were part of a minority of pieds-noirs or Algerian-born people of French descent who publicly supported the FLN and Algerian independence. In 1955, Chaulet joined the FLN. That March, he introduced Frantz Fanon to the FLN in Blida.

As a medical student, Chaulet secretly provided medical care to injured FLN fighters. The French government had restricted access to medical supplies for Algerians, so he worked with other European doctors to acquire them. He also taught basic medical skills to FLN members, including stitches and vaccinations.

Chaulet sheltered the FLN leader Ramdane Abane, smuggled FLN members in and out of the city in his car, and worked as a journalist for the FLN paper, El Moudjahid.

In 1957, he completed his medical degree. That February, his cover was blown and he was arrested, eventually getting expelled to France. Chaulet and his wife, Claudine, rejoined the FLN in Tunisia where he worked as a phthisiology doctor in Tunis and continued to write for El Moudjahid. He also contributed to the documentary film Djazaïrouna, which was broadcast to the United Nations and brought global attention to the Algerian perspective of the war.

In July 1961, Chaulet represented the Provisional Government of the Algerian Republic (GPRA) in discussions regarding the status of the Catholic Church in an independent Algeria. Along with other Catholic members of the FLN, Chaulet advocated that any Islamic buildings that had been taken over by the Catholic Church should be given back to the future Algerian state. This included the Ketchaoua Mosque in Algiers.

== After the war ==
On the first Algerian Independence Day, Chaulet and his wife were granted citizenship in honor of their work with the FLN.

After the war, he worked at the Mustapha Pacha hospital, and his wife became a professor of sociology at the University of Algiers.

Chaulet researched tuberculosis, becoming an international expert on the disease and assisting in the modernization and standardization of tuberculosis treatment and prevention. Through these efforts, he contributed to the eradication of tuberculosis in Algeria, and other countries around the world sought to duplicate this success. An active member of the International Union Against Tuberculosis and Lung Disease for several decades, he worked with WHO in various capacities including consulting and writing. In 1999, the Japanese Anti-Tuberculosis Association gave him the Princess Chichibu Memorial TB Global Award.

In 1992, when Muhammad Boudiaf was invited back to Algeria after an exile of 27 years, he asked for Pierre Chaulet's assistance. Chaulet was a member of the Conseil national économique et social (CNES) in Algeria.

In 2012, he and his wife published their memoirs, Le choix de L'Algérie : deux voix, une mémoire (The Choice of Algeria: Two Voices, One Memory).

== Personal life ==
Chaulet was Catholic. His sister, Anne-Marie, married FLN member Salah Louanchi. He met his wife, Claudine, while they were both working on Consciences Maghrébiennes. They had 3 children and 4 grandchildren.

Fellow FLN member, Mokhtar Mokhtefi, was a friend of Chaulet and wrote about meeting him and his family in his memoirs.

== Death ==
Chaulet died of stomach cancer on 5 October 2012 in Montpellier, France. Four days later, Archbishop Henri Teissier led the funeral mass in Algiers, which was attended by Lakhdar Brahimi. Chaulet's coffin was draped with the Algerian flag. At his request, he was buried near Henri Maillot at Diar Saâda's Christian Cemetery.

In an obituary, his colleague eulogized him as someone who "devoted his life to the service of Algeria, fought unceasingly for the freedom of its people and worked relentlessly for the improvement of public health, for access to care for all, and particularly for those most destitute".

== Selected works ==
- Vautier, René; Chanderli, Djamel-Eddine; Hamina, Mohamed Lakhdar; Chaulet, Pierre. Djazaïrouna. Service Cinéma du GPRA, 1961.
- Chaulet, Pierre (1987-06-01). "Compliance with anti-tuberculosis chemotherapy in developing countries". Tubercle. 68 (2, Supplement 1): 19–24. doi:10.1016/S0041-3879(87)80016-8. ISSN 0041-3879.
- Maher, Dermot; Chaulet, Pierre; Spinaci, Sergio; Harries, Anthony. "Treatment of Tuberculosis: Guidelines for National Programs". Geneva, Switzerland: World Health Organization Global Tuberculosis Programme, 1997.
- Chaulet, Pierre (2009-01-20). "La lutte antituberculeuse dans le monde: stratégies et actions sur le terrain". Respiration. 57 (3): 145–159. doi:10.1159/000195838. ISSN 0025-7931.
- Chaulet, Claudine; Chaulet, Pierre. Le choix de L'Algérie : deux voix, une mémoire (The Choice of Algeria: Two Voices, One Memory). Algiers: Barzakh Editions, 2012.
