= Tarek Lakhdar-Hamina =

Algerian film producer and actor

- Occupations: Film producer, actor
- Notable work: Twilight of Shadows; Chronicle of the Years of Fire
- Relatives: Mohammed Lakhdar-Hamina (father); Malik Lakhdar-Hamina (brother)

Tarek Lakhdar-Hamina is an Algerian film producer and actor, son of the renowned filmmaker Mohammed Lakhdar-Hamina.

== Biography ==
He has been credited as producer on several of his father's films and also appeared as a child actor in some productions. He collaborated on multiple projects, notably as producer of Twilight of Shadows.

== Filmography ==
Year	Title	Role / Function
1975	Chronicle of the Years of Fire (Chronique des années de braise)	Actor (Child 2)
1993	Autumn… October in Algiers	Producer
2014	Twilight of Shadows (Crépuscule des ombres)	Producer

== Awards, selections, and festival appearances ==
- The film Twilight of Shadows was selected as Algeria’s official entry for the 2016 Academy Awards in the Best International Feature Film category.
- During the screening of Twilight of Shadows at the Cinemania Festival (Montreal), Tarek Lakhdar-Hamina attended to promote the film.

== See also ==
- Mohammed Lakhdar-Hamina – his father
- Malik Lakhdar-Hamina – his brother
