= Mokhtar Mokhtefi =

Algerian freedom fighter

- Born: 1935; Berrouaghia, French Algeria
- Died: 2015 (aged 79–80); New York, New York, USA
- Occupations: revolutionary, writer
- Organization: National Liberation Front (FLN)
- Spouse: Elaine Mokhtefi (m. 1991)

Mokhtar Mokhtefi (Arabic: مختار مختفي; 1935–2015) was a member of the National Liberation Front (FLN) during the Algerian War of Independence. He wrote about his experiences growing up in French Algeria and fighting in the war as a radio operator in his memoir, I Was a French Muslim.

== Early life and education ==
Mokhtefi was born in 1935 in Berrouaghia, Algeria, while the country was under French colonial rule. His father was a butcher. On 8 May 1945, Mokhtefi witnessed the celebration of the end of World War II in Europe and the Sétif and Guelma massacre in which the French army massacred thousands of Algerians.

Mokhtefi was the only one of his family's six children to attend secondary school, after one of his teachers encouraged his father to let him take an entrance exam. Mokhtefi obtained a scholarship and was one of the few Algerian students at his French boarding school in Blida. His brother, Mohamed, was imprisoned for his nationalist activism.

In his memoirs, Mokhtefi recounted how his education at a French school caused a feeling of alienation from his family and his village: "I see that the habits, the beliefs, the way of thinking and acting acquired in my original environment are eroding. I’m 'Frenchicizing,' one might say." While in school, Mokhtefi became interested in both French literature and Algerian nationalism. He especially liked Victor Hugo. Although Mokhtefi admired French literature and culture, his experience as a colonized subject of France led him to write about the hypocrisy of French ideals. In particular, Mokhtefi was frustrated with the French labor movement's lack of support for Algerians, later writing: "Where is past proletarian solidarity, what has become of the values of the Enlightenment?" However, he did meet several French people who were sympathetic towards or assisted in the fight for Algerian independence, including Pierre Chaulet, Annette Roger, and several priests.

== Algerian War of Independence ==
After Mokhtefi completed high school, he worked at a school in Constantine as a maître d’internat or student monitor. In 1954, the FLN declared a revolution. Mokhtefi was involved with student and union organizing to support the Algerian War of Independence, including raising money for the FLN.

Three years into the war, Mokhtefi discovered that his political activity had caught the attention of the French colonial authorities and that other activists had been arrested. As a result, Mokhtefi took the train to Oujda, Morocco and joined the Armée de libération nationale (ALN), the armed wing of the FLN. He adopted the nom-de-guerre Amara. After training in Morocco and Tunisia, he served as a radio operator in the ALN Signal Corps, under Abdelhafid Boussouf. Mokhtefi recounted using "Chant des Partisans" to test radio transmitters. Eventually, he headed his own communications unit. To set up communication posts, he undertook dangerous border crossings, including crossing the Morice Line.

Mokhtefi references a "climate of fear and disdain" in the ALN in his memoirs. Observing corruption and unnecessary violence in the ALN, he became increasingly disillusioned with it and openly opposed some of the decisions made by ALN leaders. For example, Mokhtefi was ordered to kill two fellow Algerians for treason; believing them to be innocent, he refused. But one of his colleagues killed them and subsequently suffered from nightmares.

At the end of the war, Mokhtefi voted for Algerian independence. In his memoirs, he recounts disobeying orders and traveling from Morocco into the newly independent Algeria. At the border, he encountered an illiterate Algerian soldier who pretended to read his travel documents. Due to French colonial education policies, only 10-15% of Algerians were literate at the time of independence. Mokhtefi ends his memoirs with the statement: "Ignorance out of the barrel of a gun is preparing us for bitter tomorrows."

== After the war ==
After the war ended in 1962, Mokhtefi obtained work in government planning, but his colleagues did not support his "Marxist ideas" about land redistribution. Mokhtefi became increasingly disillusioned with Algerian politics, in part because it was dominated by the military. In 1965, the first president Ahmed Ben Bella was overthrown in a coup by Houari Boumédiène, a move of which Mokhtefi disapproved. He also criticized the suppression of free speech, comparing it to French colonialism.

In 1972, Mokhtefi met his future wife, Elaine (née Klein), at a friend's dinner in Algiers. At the time, she worked in the Algerian administration as a fixer. When Elaine was ordered to spy on a colleague, former president Ben Bella's wife, she refused. As a result, she was forced to leave Algeria, and Mokhtefi went with her. In 1974, the couple moved to Paris, where they sold jewelry and children's books that they had created. They married in 1991.

His wife has said that he experienced racism in France. After 20 years there, they ultimately ended up in New York City, where Mokhtefi studied English at Columbia University. Mokhtefi continued to follow the news in Algeria and visited his family every year. His wife has said, "The country was the love of his life. He couldn’t bear it being endangered in such a way, to see it manipulated and degraded."

== Death and legacy ==
In 2015, Mokhtefi died of cancer in New York City. His wife, Elaine, dedicated a bench to him in Riverside Park where he had enjoyed sitting. In 2024, she set up the Elaine and Mokhtar Mokhtefi Endowment to support students at the UCLA Center for Near Eastern Studies.

Towards the end of his life, Mokhtefi began working on his memoirs. Soon after his death in 2015, Barzakh Editions published his memoirs in Algeria as J’étais Français-musulman: itinéraire d’un soldat de l’ALN. Six years later, his wife's English translation was published as I Was a French Muslim by Other Press. The title references how Algerian Muslims were categorized on their identity documents. His wife has stated that the memoir "reflects his disappointment in independent Algeria. He was disappointed that Algeria failed to uphold the ideals of democracy, justice and freedom". GQ Middle East included it on a list called "Best Middle Eastern Literature to Read Now".
