= Véronique Jannot =

French actress and singer

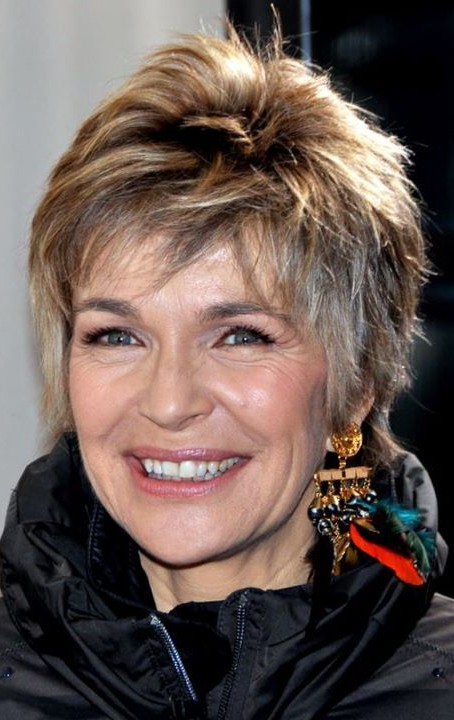
- Born: 7 May 1957 (age 69); Annecy, France
- Occupations: Actress, singer
- Years active: 1973–present

Véronique Jannot (French: [veʁɔnik ʒano]; born 7 May 1957) is a French actress and singer. She was born in Annecy, Haute-Savoie.

In 2009, she was a member of the jury at the International Fantastic Film Festival of Gérardmer 2009.

In the fall of 2011, she took part in the second season of the program Danse avec les stars on TF1, alongside the dancer Grégoire Lyonnet, and finished sixth in the competition.

In October 2022, she announced on her official website the release of a new album of nine songs2 only for sale on the site from December 7.

== Discography ==
=== Albums ===
- 2012: Tout doux

=== Singles ===
- 1975: "L'Atlantique" (with Pierre Bachelet)
- 1981: "Pause café"
- 1982: "J'ai fait l'amour avec la mer" (with Pierre Bachelet)
- 1982: "Comédie comédie" (with Pierre Bachelet and Jean-Pierre Lang)
- 1984: "Désir, désir" (with Laurent Voulzy)
- 1985: "Si t'as pas compris"
- 1985: "Vague à l'âme"
- 1985: "C'est trop facile de dire je t'aime"
- 1985: "La Première Scène"
- 1986: "Ma repentance"
- 1986: "Fragile fragile"
- 1988: "Mon héros préféré"
- 1988: "Aviateur" (certified silver)
- 1988: "Chagrin"
- 1989: "Love me forever"
- 1989: "Reviens-me dire"

== Theater ==
Year	Title	Author	Director	Notes
1973	The School for Wives	Molière	Richard Vachoux	Comédie de Genève
1974	The Effect of Gamma Rays on Man-in-the-Moon Marigolds	Paul Zindel	Michel Fagadau	Théâtre La Bruyère
1977	Der Meteor	Friedrich Dürrenmatt	Gabriel Garran	Théâtre de la Commune
1991-93	Pleins Feux	Mary Orr	Éric Civanyan	Théâtre Antoine-Simone Berriau
2004	The Vagina Monologues	Eve Ensler	Isabelle Rattier	Théâtre de la Michodière
2004	Avis de tempête	Dany Laurent	Jean-Luc Moreau	Théâtre des Variétés
2007-08	Avec deux ailes	Danielle Mathieu-Bouillon	Anne Bourgeois	Petit Théâtre de Paris
2011	Personne n'est parfait	Simon Williams	Alain Sachs	Théâtre des Bouffes-Parisiens
2015	Père et manque	Pascale Lécosse	Olivier Macé	Tour
2018	Inavouable	Éric Assous	Jean-Luc Moreau	La Coupole (Cité Internationale)

== Filmography ==
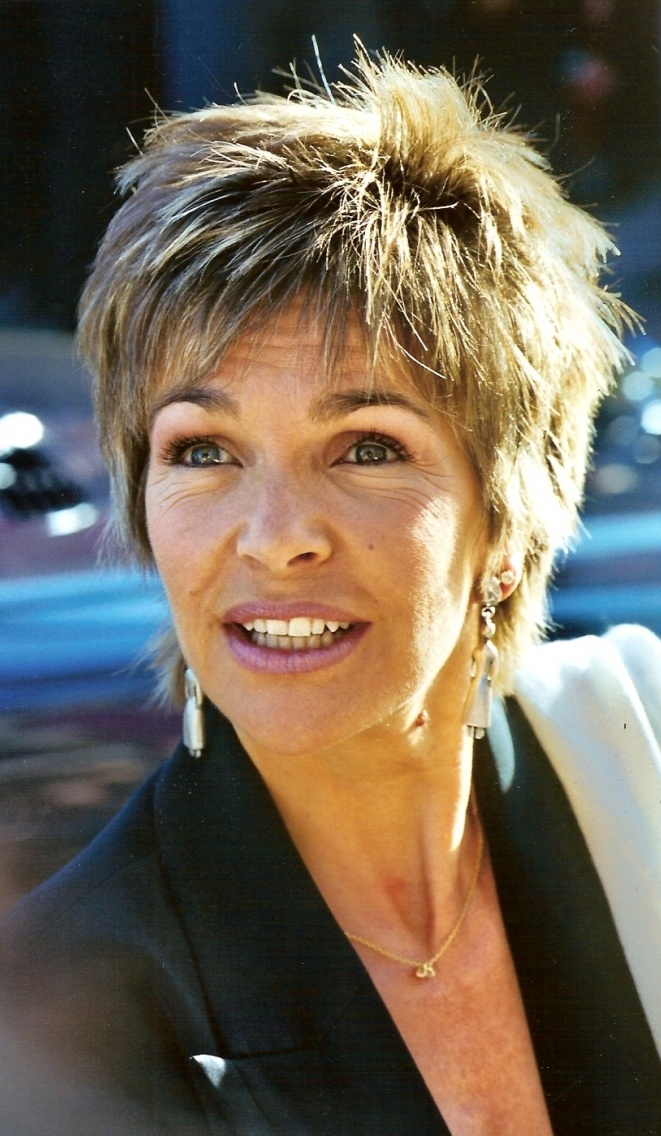
Véronique Jannot to the 2003 Cannes Film Festival

Year	Title	Role	Director	Notes
1973	Le jeune Fabre	Isabelle	Cécile Aubry	TV series (1 episode)
1974	Paul et Virginie	Virginie de la Tour	Pierre Gaspard-Huit	TV series (1 episode)
1975	Léopold le bien-aimé	Lucienne	Georges Wilson	TV movie
1975	Au théâtre ce soir	Nina	Georges Folgoas	TV series (1 episode)
1976	Qui j'ose aimer	Isa	Jean-Marie Coldefy	TV movie
1977	Aurore et Victorien	Aurore de Réquistat	Jean-Paul Carrère	TV mini-series
1978	Quatre dans une prison	Delphine de Custine	Jean-Paul Carrère	TV movie
1978	Commissaire Moulin	Corinne	François Dupont-Midi	TV series (1 episode)
1979	The Medic	Harmony	Pierre Granier-Deferre	
1979	French Postcards	Malsy	Willard Huyck	
1981	Pause-café	Joëlle Mazart	Serge Leroy	TV series (6 episodes)
1982	Tir groupé	Carine Ferrand	Jean-Claude Missiaen	
1982	Au théâtre ce soir	Corie Bratteur	Pierre Sabbagh	TV series (1 episode)
1982	Joëlle Mazart	Joëlle Mazart	Jean-Claude Charnay	TV series (6 episodes)
1983	Thieves After Dark	Isabelle	Samuel Fuller	
1984	Un été d'enfer	Elisabeth Leroy	Michael Schock	
1984	The Crime of Ovide Plouffe	Marie	Denys Arcand	
1986	The Last Image	Claire Boyer	Mohammed Lakhdar-Hamina	
1989	Doux Amer	Anne Lambert	Franck Apprederis	
1989	Pause café, pause tendresse	Joëlle Calvet	Serge Leroy & Charles L. Bitsch	TV series (8 episodes)
1990	Notre Juliette	Marie	François Luciani	TV movie
1990	Mademoiselle Ardel	Corine Ardel	Michael Braun	TV movie
1991	L'héritière	Valérie Belfond	Jean Sagols	TV movie
1992	Touch and Die	Catherine	Piernico Solinas	TV movie
1992	Softwar	Nina Voronkov	Michel Lang	TV movie
1993	Le ciel pour témoin	Sophie	Denis Amar	TV movie
1993	Les saigneurs	Helen	Yvan Butler	TV movie
1993	Pleins feux	Catherine Moreau	Marion Sarraut	TV movie
1994	Le silence du coeur	Louise	Pierre Aknine	TV movie
1995	Charlotte et Léa	Charlotte	Jean-Claude Sussfeld	TV movie
1995	L'enfant des rues	Marianne	François Luciani	TV movie
1995	Une femme dans la tempête	Catherine	Bertrand Van Effenterre	TV movie
1996	Loin des yeux	Raphaëlle Verdier	Christian Faure	TV movie
1996-2002	Madame le consul	Alice Beaulieu	Jean Sagols	TV series (8 episodes)
1997	C'est l'homme de ma vie	Martine	Pierre Lary	TV movie 7 d'Or - Best Actress in Movie Made for TV
1997	Sud lointain	Catherine Tannere	Thierry Chabert	TV mini-series
1998	Théo et Marie	Adeline	Henri Helman	TV movie
1998	Pour mon fils	Carole Lefèvre	Michaëla Watteaux	TV movie
1998	Manège	Marine Dervin	Charlotte Brandström & Marc Angelo	TV mini-series
2002	La source des Sarrazins	Béatrice de Lagny	Denis Malleval	TV movie
2003	Docteur Claire Bellac	Claire Bellac	Denis Malleval	TV series (2 episodes)
2004	Pardon	Clémence	Alain Schwartzstein	TV movie
2006	Les secrets du volcan	Cristina Mahé	Michaëla Watteaux	TV mini-series
2007	Commissaire Cordier	Fanny Vissac	Olivier Langlois	TV series (1 episode)
2011	Section de recherches	Ève	François Guérin	TV series (1 episode)
2013	Le bonheur sinon rien!	Fleur Miller	Régis Musset	TV movie
2014	R.I.S, police scientifique	Christine	Hervé Brami	TV series (1 episode)
2016	Camping paradis	Caro	Philippe Proteau	TV series (1 episode)
2018-19	Philharmonia	Professor Badiou	Louis Choquette	TV series (6 episodes)
2019-21	Léo Matteï, brigade des mineurs	Doctor Fabre	Hervé Renoh	TV series (8 episodes)
2019-22	Tomorrow Is Ours	Anne-Marie Lazzari	Jérôme Navarro, Jérémie Patier, ...	TV series (86 episodes)
2023	Scènes de ménages	Monique	Francis Duquet	TV series (1 episode)
