= The Big Red One =

1980 film by Samuel Fuller

- Theatrical release poster
- Directed by: Samuel Fuller
- Written by: Samuel Fuller
- Produced by: Gene Corman
- Starring: Lee Marvin; Mark Hamill; Robert Carradine; Bobby Di Cicco; Kelly Ward; Siegfried Rauch; Stéphane Audran
- Cinematography: Adam Greenberg
- Edited by: Morton Tubor; Bryan McKenzie (Reconstruction cut)
- Music by: Dana Kaproff
- Production company: Lorimar
- Distributed by: United Artists
- Release dates: May 16, 1980 (Cannes); July 18, 1980 (US)
- Running time: 113 minutes 162 minutes (Reconstruction cut)
- Country: United States
- Language: English
- Budget: $4 million
- Box office: $7.2 million

The Big Red One is a 1980 American epic war film written and directed by Samuel Fuller, and starring Lee Marvin alongside an ensemble supporting cast, including Mark Hamill, Robert Carradine, Bobby Di Cicco, Kelly Ward, Siegfried Rauch and Stéphane Audran. The film was based on Fuller's own experiences as a U.S. Army soldier during World War II. The title refers to the nickname of the 1st Infantry Division, Fuller's wartime unit.

A longtime passion project of Fuller's, development of The Big Red One began in the late 1950s. The film was produced independently on a low budget, and shot on-location in Israel and Ireland as a cost-saving measure. During post-production, distributor United Artists recut the film without Fuller's input, significantly shortening the runtime.

The film premiered at the 1980 Cannes Film Festival, where it was nominated for the Palme d'Or. It was theatrically released in the United States on July 13, 1980 to positive reviews. Fuller also published a book with the same title, which was more a companion novel than a novelization of the film, although it features many of the scenes that were originally cut.

A restored version closer to Fuller's original vision, The Big Red One: The Reconstruction, premièred at the 2004 Cannes Film Festival, seven years after Fuller's death.

== Plot ==
In a sepia-tinted prologue, a United States Army private (Lee Marvin) kills a German soldier with his trench knife, not believing the man's claims the Great War is over. His company commander then tells him the war ended four hours earlier.

In November 1942, during World War II, the US soldier is now a sergeant in the "Big Red One" leading a squad of infantrymen consisting of Private Griff, a cartoonist, Zab, an aspiring writer, Vinci and Johnson. They first landed unopposed at the beach landing in North Africa against the Vichy French army. By February, the squad and their battalion were forced to retreat after the disastrous defeat during the Battle of Kasserine Pass; the Sergeant was wounded, and taken as prisoner of war in a makeshift hospital, but he is freed after the fall of Tunis.

After reuniting with the rest of the squad, they participate in an amphibious invasion of Sicily. As they fight their way in Italy, the Sergeant and his squad earned a reputation of the moniker: the Four Horsemen; since four of the soldiers in the squad have survived through both campaigns in Africa and Italy. The squad next landed in the first wave of the assault on Omaha Beach on D-Day in Normandy, then fought through France, Belgium and the Huertgen Forest of Germany.

A German Army sergeant named Schroeder is seen in many of the same battles, sharing the perspective of his American counterpart that soldiers are killers, but not murderers. The squad's participation in the battles is portrayed in a series of vignettes, including the rescue of a Belgian underground agent in a German-held asylum, an ambush of the squad by Schroeder which goes awry, and the squad's assistance to a French woman in labour which allows Schroeder to escape.

The squad takes part in the liberation of Falkenau concentration camp in Czechoslovakia. Griff, whose courage is questioned throughout the film, is driven by the horrors of the camp to kill one of the guards who refuses to surrender. The sergeant befriends a child inmate who dies later that day. That night Schroeder, realizing the war is over, attempts to surrender but is stabbed by the sergeant. The squad informs him that the war in Europe ended four hours earlier. Griff notices that Schroeder is still alive and the sergeant and his men work frantically to save his life. Zab, in voice-over, remarks that he and his fellow American troops have more in common with the German, because they've survived the war, than they do with the many replacements they fought alongside, who are dead.

== Cast ==
- Lee Marvin as Sgt. Possum
- Mark Hamill as Private Griff
- Robert Carradine as Private Zab
- Bobby Di Cicco as Private Vinci
- Kelly Ward as Private Johnson
- Siegfried Rauch as Feldwebel Schroeder
- Stéphane Audran as Belgian Resistance Fighter
- Perry Lang as Private Kaiser
- Serge Marquand as Rensonnet
- Charles Macaulay as Maj. Gen. Clarence R. Huebner
- Alain Doutey as Vichy Sgt. Broban
- Maurice Marsac as Vichy Colonel
- Joseph Clark as Pvt. Shep
- Ken Campbell as Pvt. Lemchek
- Matteo Zoffoli as Matteo
- Marthe Villalonga as Madame Marbaise
- Giovanna Galletti as Sicilian Woman
- Samuel Fuller as War Correspondent
- Christa Lang as Countess (extended cut only)
- Ulli Kinalzik as Gerd (uncredited)
- Guy Marchand as Chapier (uncredited)

== Background ==
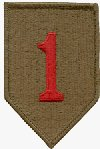
Patch of the United States Army's 1st Infantry Division

The Big Red One is semi-autobiographical in nature, based on Samuel Fuller's experiences serving in the 16th Infantry Regiment, 1st Infantry Division of the U.S. Army during World War II. The unit is nicknamed "The Big Red One" for the red numeral "1" on the division's shoulder patch. He received the Silver Star, Bronze Star, and Purple Heart during his service. He was present at the liberation of the Falkenau concentration camp. The 2004 reconstructed version refers to it as "a fictional life based on a factual death."

According to a journalistic account published in Poland in 2023 the character of Sergeant Possum, portrayed by Lee Marvin, was inspired by Command Sergeant Major Theodore L. Dobol, who served with distinction in the 1st Infantry Division during World War II.

Fuller's screenplay was drawn from a wartime diary he kept, reflected in the character Zab (Robert Carradine), and a regimental history he co-authored in 1946.

== Production ==
=== Development ===
Warner Bros. was interested in filming The Big Red One in the late 1950s, sending Fuller on a trip to Europe to scout locations. Fuller directed Merrill's Marauders as a dry run for the film. When Fuller argued with Jack L. Warner and his studio over cuts they made to Merrill's Marauders, the plans for The Big Red One were dropped.

In the project's early stages, at Jack L. Warner's urging, John Wayne was lined up to play the sergeant, but Fuller felt that he was not right for the role.

Peter Bogdanovich helped set up the film at Paramount Pictures, which paid Fuller to write a script. When Paramount head Frank Yablans left the studio, though, the project was put in turnaround. It shifted over to Lorimar with Bogdanovich to produce (he says Fuller wanted him to play the Robert Carradine part), but then Bogdanovich pulled out and brought in Gene Corman to produce.

=== Filming ===
Fuller originally hoped to shoot the film on-location in the countries where the film took place, including France, Germany, Libya and Italy. However, due to the reduced budget, filming instead took place mainly in Israel, with the support of the Israel Defense Forces. Other scenes were filmed in the Republic of Ireland and the Sierra Madre mountains of California.

=== Editing ===
Fuller's rough cut of the film ran nearly four hours long, which he later reduced to two hours. United Artists insisted the runtime be reduced further, and the final theatrical cut ran 113 minutes.

== Release ==
The film was entered into the 1980 Cannes Film Festival.

=== Critical reception ===
Review aggregator website Rotten Tomatoes reported an 88% approval rating based on 49 reviews. The website's critics consensus reads, "The reconstruction of Samuel Fuller's epic account of his days in North Africa in World War II elevates the film into the pantheon of great war movies." For "the Reconstruction" cut, Metacritic assigned a score of 77 out of 100, based on 19 critics, indicating "generally favorable reviews".

In his review of the original, theatrical version of the film, Roger Ebert gave it three out of four stars, and wrote:

While this is an expensive epic, he hasn't fallen to the temptations of the epic form. He doesn't give us a lot of phony meaning, as if to justify the scope of the production. There aren't a lot of deep, significant speeches. In the ways that count, The Big Red One is still a B-movie – hard-boiled, filled with action, held together by male camaraderie, directed with a lean economy of action. It's one of the most expensive B-pictures ever made, and I think that helps it fit the subject. "A" war movies are about war, but "B" war movies are about soldiers.

In November 2004, Ebert gave the film four out of four stars, and added it to his list of "great movies".

The Big Red One ranks 483rd on Empire magazine's 2008 list of the 500 greatest movies of all time. Terry Lawson of the Detroit Free Press called it the greatest war movie of all time.

== Extended cut ==
The restored version, dubbed "the Reconstruction" and completed in 2004, adds 47 minutes to the film's running time, bringing it much closer to the form Fuller imagined before the studio took it away from him. Film critic Richard Schickel — who praised the 1980 version in Time when it was released — took the lead on the restoration, which relied on locating footage allegedly stashed in the Warner Bros. vault in Kansas City. He was aided by editor Bryan McKenzie and Bogdanovich.
