= Berrouaghia =

Berrouaghia البرواقية Birwaghia
- Commune and town
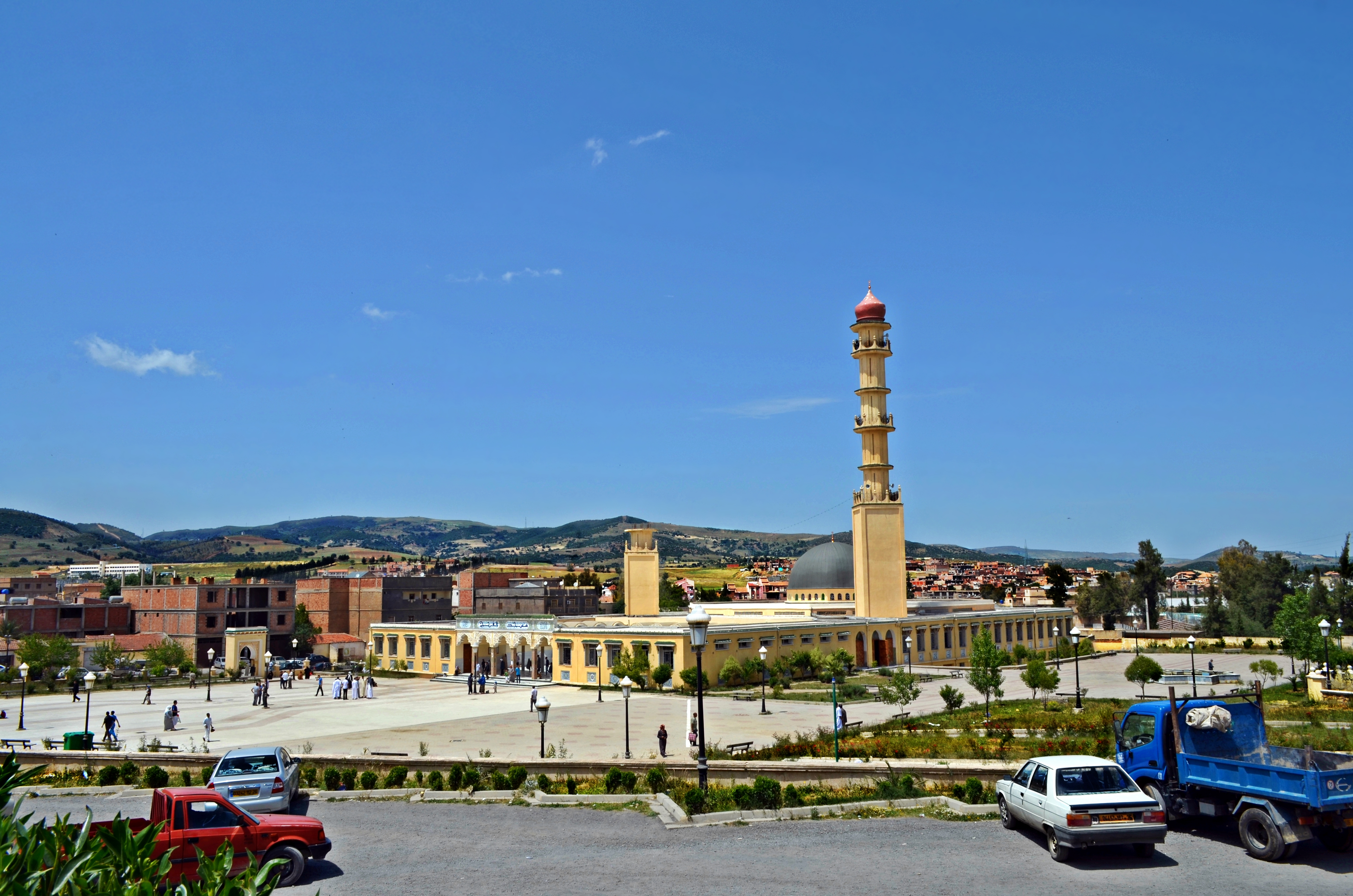
- Berrouaghia
- Nickname: Tanaramusa

- Location within Algeria
- Coordinates: 36°08′N 2°55′E
- Country: Algeria
- Province: Médéa Province

Population (2008)
  - Total: 60,152
- Time zone: UTC+1 (CET)
- CP: 26200

Berrouaghia is a town and commune in Médéa Province, Algeria. According to the 1998 census, it has a population of 58,780.

== History ==
Berrouaghia's historical significance dates back to the Roman Empire, known as Tanaramusa Castra. Tanaramusa was an ancient Roman town and served as the seat of an early Christian Bishopric in North Africa.

== Notable people ==
- Benyoucef Benkhedda - Algerian politician, leader during Algerian War of Independence
- Mokhtar Mokhtefi - member of the National Liberation Front (FLN)
