= Scandal Sheet (1985 film) =

- Genre: Drama
- Written by: Howard Rodman
- Directed by: David Lowell Rich
- Starring: Burt Lancaster; Robert Urich; Lauren Hutton; Pamela Reed
- Music by: Randy Edelman
- Country of origin: United States
- Original language: English

Production
- Executive producer: Henry Winkler
- Producers: Irwin Winkler; Roger Birnbaum
- Production location: Agua Dulce Air Park at Agua Dulce, California
- Cinematography: Jacques R. Marquette
- Editor: Peter E. Berger
- Running time: 101 minutes
- Production company: Fair Dinkum Productions

Original release
- Network: ABC
- Release: January 21, 1985

Scandal Sheet is a 1985 American made-for-television drama film directed by David Lowell Rich and starring Burt Lancaster. The film first aired on ABC on January 21, 1985.

== Plot ==
Harold Fallen is a sleazy tabloid publisher. Interested only in selling papers, Fallen sees an easy target in recovering alcoholic actor Ben Rowan, who is trying to make a comeback. Reporter Helen Grant is in serious economic trouble, and Fallen hires her to dig up dirt on the actor due to her close friendship with his wife, Meg North. Helen has to choose between her friendship and journalistic integrity on the one hand, and her desperation and Harold Fallen's persuasive ways on the other.

== Cast ==
| Actor | Role |
|---|---|
| Burt Lancaster | Harold Fallen |
| Robert Urich | Ben Rowan |
| Lauren Hutton | Meg North |
| Pamela Reed | Helen Grant |
| Peter Jurasik | Simon McKey |
| Trey Wilson | Paul Brown |
| Bobby Di Cicco | Platte |
| Rance Howard | Mr. Bell |
| Frances McDormand | Andrea |
