= Elaine Mokhtefi =

Algerian-American activist and author (1928–2026)

- Born: Elaine Klein; December 10, 1928; Hempstead, New York, U.S.
- Died: September 11, 2026 (aged 97); New York City, U.S.
- Spouse: Mokhtar Mokhtefi (died 2015)

Elaine Mokhtefi (née Klein; December 10, 1928 – September 11, 2026) was an American and Algerian activist, translator and writer. Born in New York, Mokhtefi began working as a translator for anti-racist and anti-colonial activist movements after moving to Paris in her twenties. She supported Algerian independence efforts, then lived in Algeria from 1962 until she was forced to leave the country in 1974. Her memoir of her time there, Algiers, Third World Capital: Freedom Fighters, Revolutionaries, Black Panthers, was published by Verso Books in 2018.

== Early life ==
Elaine Klein was born in Hempstead, New York, on December 10, 1928. Her family was secular Jewish, and she described facing antisemitism throughout her childhood. Her parents were not particularly political, though her father at one point attended Socialist Party meetings, and she described her mother as "especially anti-racist".

At age 16, she enrolled at Wesleyan College, a Christian school in Georgia. Mokhtefi protested against the segregationist environment, and she was kicked out after a year.

After returning to New York, she studied languages and joined the anti-war group United World Federalists (UWF). She was pushed out of her job at the UWF after internal divisions. In 1951, at age 23, she traveled to Paris from New York by boat, a trip that took 14 days. In Paris, she worked as a French–English translator.

== Activism ==
Mokhtefi worked as an anti-racist and anti-colonial activist early into her life.

In 1952, after arriving in France, she attended the International Workers' Day parade in Paris, where she met Algerian trade unionists. Becoming more deeply involved in this activism, she participated in the All-African Peoples' Conference in Accra, Ghana, in 1958. There, she met Frantz Fanon and Mohamed Sahnoun. Mokhtefi decided to work alongside them in support of the anti-colonial Algerian National Liberation Front (FLN). She joined Sahnoun in New York and settled there in 1960. In New York, she began working for the local bureau of the Provisional Government of the Algerian Republic and the FLN to promote and lobby for Algerian independence at the United Nations. She also took classes at New York University.

As Fanon's health declined in 1961, eventually leading to his death, Mokhtefi visited him regularly and supported his family, helping to take care of his 6-year-old son, Olivier.

After Algeria gained independence in 1962, Mokhtefi settled in Algiers. She was hired as the only American in the new administration and worked as a translator and envoy. She initially worked for Algeria's tourism authority before working for the Algerian Secretary General. She attended the 1967 Latin American Solidarity Organization conference. In 1969, she was put in charge of organizing the first Pan-African Cultural Festival in Algiers. She also helped welcome members of national liberation movements across Africa (Mozambique, Angola, South Africa) and international Black Panther members to Algeria. In particular, she helped organize the clandestine exile of Eldridge Cleaver in Algeria after he fled the United States via Cuba. She also met the likes of Fidel Castro, Houari Boumédiène, Ahmed Ben Bella, and Ho Chi Minh through her work.

She protested against the 1965 Algerian coup d'état led by Boumédiène. She was forced to leave Algeria in 1974, after being ordered to spy on a colleague and friend, Zohra Sellami, during power struggles in the newly-established country, and refusing. She settled in Paris with Mokhtar Mokhtefi. In Paris, she worked a number of jobs, including as a jeweler and a children's books author. She was not allowed to return to Algeria for over four decades.

She returned to New York in 1994 where she continued her activism, participating in antiwar actions, climate marches, Occupy Wall Street, and pro-Palestinian protests.

== Writing ==
During her time in Algeria, Mokhtefi worked as a journalist for the Algeria Press Service, covering news from the Third World in particular. She wrote daily op-eds and was the service's primary English writer.

After leaving for France, she and her husband co-wrote several books on history for young readers.

In 2018, she published the memoir Algiers, Third World Capital: Freedom Fighters, Revolutionaries, Black Panthers. It was published the following year in France under the title Alger, capitale de la révolution: De Fanon aux Black Panthers, with Mokhtefi completing the translation into French herself. It was also released in Algeria in 2019.

== Personal life and death ==
After their marriage, Klein took the surname of her husband, writer and former Algerian National Liberation Army member Mokhtar Mokhtefi. The couple met in Algiers in 1972, then he joined her when she was forced to leave the country two years later. They lived together in Paris for two decades, then in New York for another two decades until his death in 2015.

Mokhtefi died in New York City on September 11, 2026, at the age of 97.

== See also ==
- Revolutionary activities in Algeria
