= Thieves After Dark =

1984 film

Thieves After Dark Les voleurs de la nuit
- Directed by: Samuel Fuller
- Written by: Olivier Beer; Samuel Fuller
- Starring: Véronique Jannot; Bobby Di Cicco
- Music by: Ennio Morricone
- Distributed by: Parafrance Films
- Release date: 25 April 1984
- Running time: 98 minutes
- Country: France
- Language: English

Thieves After Dark (French: Les voleurs de la nuit) is a 1984 French drama film directed by Samuel Fuller starring Véronique Jannot and Bobby Di Cicco. It was entered into the 34th Berlin International Film Festival.

== Cast ==
- Véronique Jannot as Isabelle
- Bobby Di Cicco as Francois
- Victor Lanoux as Inspector Farbet
- Stéphane Audran as Isabelle's mother
- Camille de Casabianca as Corinne
- Micheline Presle as Geneviève
- Christa Lang as Solange
- Marthe Villalonga as The Concierge
