= The Last Image =

1986 film

- Directed by: Mohammed Lakhdar-Hamina
- Written by: Mourad Bourboune; Jean-Claude Carrière; Mohammed Lakhdar-Hamina
- Produced by: Jean-Pierre Sammut
- Starring: Véronique Jannot
- Cinematography: Youcef Sahraoui
- Edited by: Youcef Tobni
- Distributed by: Cannon Films
- Release date: 19 November 1986
- Running time: 195 minutes
- Country: Algeria
- Language: French

The Last Image (Arabic: الصور الأخير, translit. Al-soura al-akhira, French: La dernière image) is a 1986 Algerian drama film directed by Mohammed Lakhdar-Hamina. It was entered into the 1986 Cannes Film Festival. The film was selected as the Algerian entry for the Best Foreign Language Film at the 59th Academy Awards, but was not accepted as a nominee.

== Cast ==
- Véronique Jannot as Claire Boyer
- Merwan Lakhdar-Hamina as Mouloud
- Michel Boujenah as Simon Attal
- Jean Bouise as Langlois
- Jean-François Balmer as Miller
- Hassan El-Hassani as Touhami
- José Artur as Forrestier
- Malik Lakhdar-Hamina as Bachir
- Mustapha El Anka as Kabrane
- Mustapha Preur as Boutaleb
- Geneviève Mnich as Madame Lanier
- Brigitte Catillon as Madame Lenguenel
- Rachid Fares as Omar
- Claude Melki as Jacob, le cafetier
- Mohammed Lakhdar-Hamina as Oncle Amar

== See also ==
- List of submissions to the 59th Academy Awards for Best Foreign Language Film
- List of Algerian submissions for the Academy Award for Best Foreign Language Film
