= Raye Hollitt =

American actress and female bodybuilder (born 1964)

Raye Hollitt - Olson
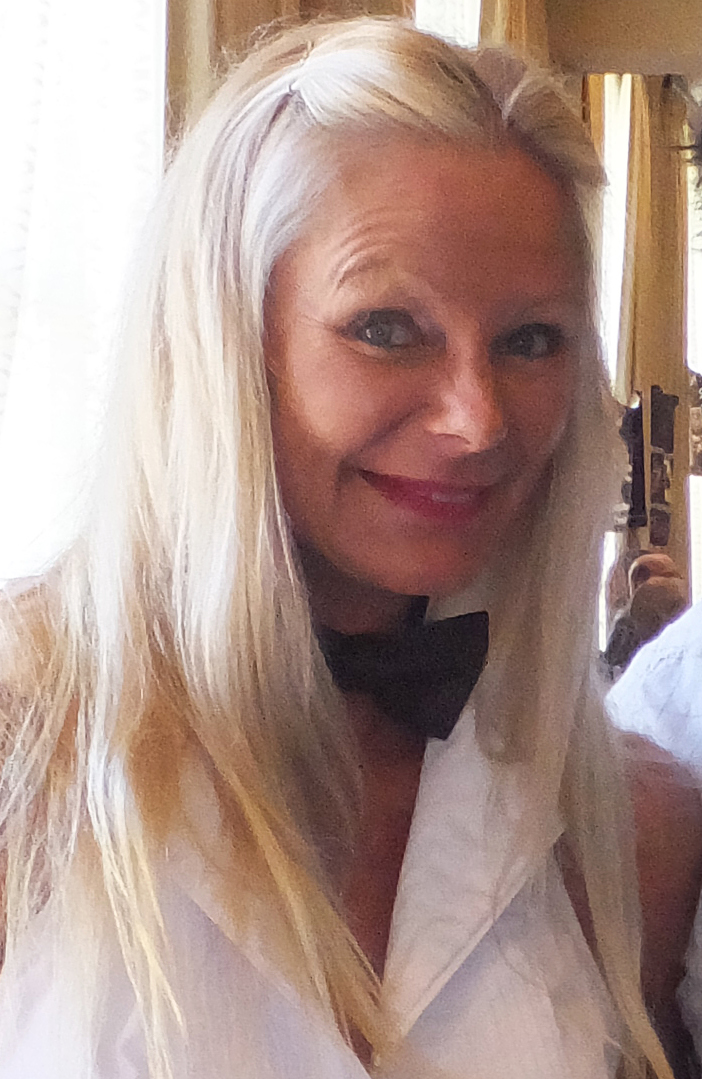
- Hollitt at the Chiller Theatre Expo 2014
- Born: April 17, 1964 (age 62); Wilkes-Barre, Pennsylvania, United States
- Other names: Rain; Zap
- Occupations: Personal Trainer, ex-bodybuilder, actress, massage therapist, snowboard instructor
- Spouse: Kenn Olson
- Website: rayehollitt.com

Raye Hollitt (born April 17, 1964) is an American actress and bodybuilder, also known by her stage name Zap and Rain, one of the original cast members of American Gladiators.

== Biography ==
Hollitt graduated from Lake-Lehman High School in 1982, then worked as a paralegal for seven years.

She appeared in Season 1 of American Gladiators in 1989, taking off the second season (1990–91) for maternity leave, before returning for Season 3 and continuing on the show through 1995. She reappeared for an alumni show in the final season (1995–96).

Before she found fame as Zap, Hollitt was a contestant on the game show Card Sharks, and featured in Blake Edwards's 1989 comedy, Skin Deep. Raye also did the pilot for JAG (Judge Advocate General) where she played a pilot, Cassie. Raye also appeared on Baywatch, Blossom, and several other TV shows.

== Personal life ==
She and her husband, Kenn, now reside in South Lake Tahoe.

== Bodybuilding career ==
=== Contest history ===
Raye Hollitt
- Professional bodybuilder

Personal info
- Born: April 17, 1964 (age 62); Wilkes-Barre, Pennsylvania

Best statistics
- Weight: 123–127 lb (56–58 kg)

Professional (Pro) career
- Best win: 1988 NPC Los Angeles Overall Champion; 1988
- Active: Retired 1992

- 1987 NPC Extravaganza - 2nd (HW)
- 1988 NPC Junior USA Championship - 5th (HW)
- 1988 NPC Los Angeles Championship 1st (HW & overall)
- 1992 NPC California Championship - 2nd (HW)
- 1992 NPC Nationals - 6th (HW)

=== Magazine covers ===
- Women's Physique World, July 1988
- Musclemag International, October 1991
- Muscle Training Illustrated, May 1992
- Musclemag International, December 1992
- Musclemag International, January 1993
- Muscular Development, February 1993
- Muscular Development, February 1994
- Women's Physique World, May/June 1995

== Acting career ==
=== Filmography ===
| Year | Title | Role | Other notes |
|---|---|---|---|
| 2024 | Knuckles | Zap | |
| 2007 | Revamped | Bombshell | |
| 2001 | Manhunt | Hunter | as Rain |
| 1998 | Day of the Warrior | Kym | |
| 1994 | Cyborg 3: The Recycler | Finola | |
| 1993 | Hot Shots! Part Deux | American Gladiator | as Zap |
| 1991 | The Immortalizer | Queenie | |
| 1991 | The Last Hour | Adler | |
| 1989 | Skin Deep | Lonnie Jones | |
| 1987 | Penitentiary III | Female Boxer | |

=== Television work ===
- Family Feud (1993/1994). Episode - ”American Gladiators”
- Baywatch (1992). Episode - ”Point Doom”
- JAG (1995). Episodes - ”A New Life”
- Muppets Tonight (1997). Episode - ”The Gary Cahuenga Episode”
