= Djamel Chanderli =

Documentary Films Veteran

Djamel-Eddine Chanderli
- Born: Djamel-Eddine Chanderli; 1920; Annaba, Algeria
- Died: November 10, 1990; Paris, France
- Citizenship: Algerian
- Occupations: Film director, documentary filmmaker, activist
- Notable work: Djazaïrouna, La Voix du Peuple, Les Fusils de la Liberté, Yasmina

Djamel-Eddine Chanderli (also known as Djamel Chanderli; 1920 – November 10, 1990) was an Algerian filmmaker, documentary director, and independence activist. He was active during the Algerian War of Independence, notably within the cinema unit of the GPRA and the maquis. His work includes war footage, short documentary films, and politically engaged montage films.

== Biography ==
Djamel-Eddine Chanderli was born in 1920 in Annaba, Algeria. During the Algerian War of Independence, he joined the maquis in 1956 and began filming from within the territory under struggle.

He was part of the cinema unit established by the Provisional Government of the Algerian Republic (GPRA) in 1957.

After Algeria independence, he held several positions, including head of the *Office des nouvelles actualités algériennes* (1963) and later director of the audiovisual department at Sonatrach (1969). In 1979, he moved to Paris, where he led the audiovisual department of the Algerian Cultural Center from its inauguration in 1983 until his death.

== Filmography ==
Below is a non-exhaustive list of films and short documentaries directed or co-directed by Djamel-Eddine Chanderli.

Year	Title	Type / Role
1958	Réfugiés Algériens (Algerian Refugees, with Pierre Clément)	Short documentary, co-director
1959–1960	Djazaïrouna (Our Algeria)	Montage documentary, co-director
1961	La Voix du Peuple (Sawt Echaâb)	Documentary / archival footage, co-director
1961	Les Fusils de la Liberté (The Rifles of Freedom)	Short film, co-director
1961	Yasmina	Short film, docufiction
1961	Sakiet Sidi Youcef	Documentary
1961	Allons enfants pour l’Algérie	Documentary / montage
1961	J’ai huit ans (I Am Eight Years Old)	Short documentary, collaborator

== Legacy ==
- Considered one of the first Algerian filmmakers to document the independence struggle from within the country.
- His work contributed to preserving the visual memory of the Algerian War of Independence.
- As head of the audiovisual department of the Algerian Cultural Center in Paris, he helped promote Algerian cinema and culture abroad.

== See also ==
- Cinema of Algeria
- Mohammed Lakhdar-Hamina
- René Vautier
