= Bobby Di Cicco =

American actor

- Citizenship: United States
- Occupation: Actor
- Years active: 1978–1996, 2016–2018, 2025–present
- Children: Jessica DiCicco

Bobby Di Cicco is an American actor best known for his early roles in the films I Wanna Hold Your Hand (1978) by Robert Zemeckis, 1941 (1979) by Steven Spielberg, Samuel Fuller's The Big Red One (1980), and the John Carpenter-produced The Philadelphia Experiment (1984).

Di Cicco is the father of actress Jessica DiCicco.

== Filmography ==
=== Film ===
Bobby Di Cicco film credits
| Year | Title | Role | Notes |
|---|---|---|---|
| 1978 | I Wanna Hold Your Hand | Tony Smerko | |
| 1978 | Towing | Tony | |
| 1979 | 1941 | Wally Stephens | |
| 1980 | The Big Red One | Pvt. Vinci - 1st Squad | |
| 1982 | National Lampoon's Movie Madness | Nicholas Naxos | Segment: "Success Wanters" |
| 1982 | Night Shift | Leonard | |
| 1983 | Wavelength | Marvin Horn | |
| 1984 | Thieves After Dark | François | |
| 1984 | Splash | Jerry | |
| 1984 | The Philadelphia Experiment | Jim Parker | |
| 1986 | The Supernaturals | Pvt. Tim Cort | |
| 1987 | Number One with a Bullet | Malcolm | |
| 1988 | Tiger Warsaw | Tony | |
| 1988 | Double Revenge | Burt | |
| 1989 | She's Back | Bob | |
| 1990 | A Man Called Sarge | Anzalone | |
| 1991 | Frame Up | Mick J. August | |
| 1991 | The Last Hour | Lombardi | |
| 1993 | Maniac Cop III: Badge of Silence | Bishop | |
| 1993 | The Baby Doll Murders | Larry | |
| 1994 | Killing Obsession | Pimp | |
| 1994 | Ghoulies IV | Scotty | |
| 1996 | All Dogs Go to Heaven 2 | Thom (voice) | |
| 2018 | An Interview with God | Bobby | |

=== Television ===
Bobby Di Cicco television credits
| Year | Title | Role | Notes |
|---|---|---|---|
| 1981 | One Day at a Time | Steve Smith | Episode: "Airport" |
| 1982 | Cagney & Lacey | Manny | Episode: "Hot Line" |
| 1985 | Scandal Sheet | Platte | TV movie |
| 1985 | Tales from the Darkside | Dr. Coe | Episode: "The Impressionist" |
| 1986 | The Equalizer | Anza Serrato | Episode: "Unnatural Causes" |
| 1986–1994 | Murder, She Wrote | Philip Bonelli / Antonio D'Argento | 2 episodes |
| 1987 | The A-Team | Joey Baroni | Episode: "Without Reservations" |
| 2016 | The Night Of | Eczema Help Group Member | 2 episodes |

=== As himself ===
- Sam Fuller and the Big Red One (1979)
- Don Siegel: Last of the Independents (1980)
- The Making of 1941 (1996)
- The Men Who Made the Movies: Samuel Fuller (2002)
- Ban the Sadist Videos! (2005)
- The Real Glory - Reconstructing The Big Red One (2005)
- Video Nasties: Moral Panic, Censorship & Videotape (2010)
