= Mohammed Lakhdar-Hamina =

Algerian film director and screenwriter (1934–2025)

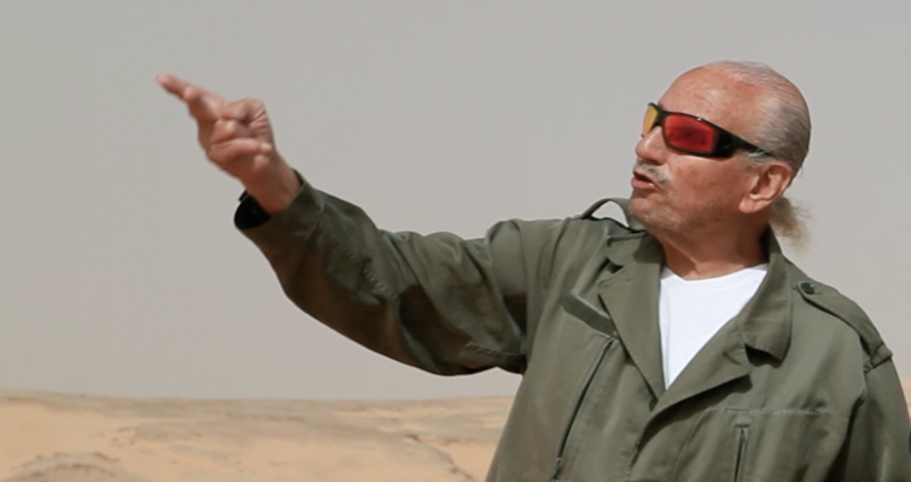
- Born: 26 February 1934; M'Sila, French Algeria
- Died: 23 May 2025 (aged 91); Algiers, Algeria
- Occupations: Film director and screenwriter
- Known for: Chronicle of the Years of Fire (1975)

Mohammed Lakhdar-Hamina (Arabic: محمد الأخضر حمينة; 26 February 1934 – 23 May 2025) was an Algerian film director and screenwriter. He is best known for his 1975 film Chronicle of the Years of Fire, which won the Palme d'Or at the 1975 Cannes Film Festival and became the first Arab and African film to win the award. He is one of the most prominent figures in contemporary Arabic cinema.

== Life and career ==
Born on 26 February 1934 at M'Sila, Algeria, Lakhdar began his studies in his native country. He first became interested in the world of cinema at the Lycée Carnot in Cannes, France. After beginning studies of agriculture and law at French universities, he deserted the French Army in 1958 and joined the anti-French Algerian Resistance in Tunisia, where he worked for the provisional Algerian government in exile. His film career began as he joined the Algerian Maquis (guerrillas).

In 1959, the Algerian National Liberation Front (FLN) sent him to Prague, where he pursued his cinematography studies at the cinema school, Film and TV School of the Academy of Performing Arts in Prague, the Czech academy for cinema and television. However, he quit his studies in order to work for the Barrandov Studios. Also in 1959, the Algerian ministry of information in exile commissioned Lakhdar-Hamina, together with Djamel Chanderli and Pierre Chaulet, to produce a movie about Algeria's predicament under French colonialism. The documentary film, titled Djazzaïrouna (Our Algeria), aimed at portraying the goals pursued by the Algerian nationalist guerrilla movement, the Maquis.

In 1960, he joined the Service Cinema, created by the Algerian government in exile.

In 1961, Lakhdar-Hamina collaborated with Chanderli in the movie Yasmina, which tells the story of a refugee girl who must flee her village following its destruction. Lakhdar-Hamina collaborated again with Chanderli in the 1962 The people's voice and 1961 The guns of freedom. Upon Algerian independence in 1962, he returned to his homeland where, together with his colleagues from Tunisian exile, he founded the Office des actualités algériennes, of which he was director from 1963 until its dissolution in 1974.

From 1981 until 1984, he acted as director of the Office National pour le Commerce et l'Industrie Cinématographique, the most important institution for furtherance of the French film industry. One of his most recent films, The last image, was part of the Official Selection at Cannes Film Festival in 1986 and was nominated for the Golden Palm.

Lakhdar-Hamina's son, Malik Lakhdar-Hamina, became well known after the release of his first long film, Autumn: October in Algiers (1992), a film that explores the riots of October 1988 through the microcosm of an Algerian family split by a Westernized versus Islamicized view of contemporary Algeria. His other son, Tariq Lakhdar-Hamina, is a film producer.

== Death ==
On 23 May 2025, Lakhdar-Hamina died in his home in Algiers, at the age of 91.

== Influences and contributions ==
From its inception, Algerian cinema was intertwined with the ideological and existential debates that surrounded the Algerian war of independence and the postcolonial nation-building stage.

In this context, Lakhdar-Hamina's cinematographic career significantly contributed to the development of a new filmic language characteristic of contemporary Maghrebi cinema in general and Algerian in particular, notably distinct from the filmic experiences of other Arab countries and most particularly of the Egyptian cinematic industry.

Following Algeria's independence, Algerian cinema focused on new artistic forms concerned with the search for national identity, but financial difficulties and the lack of an Algerian industry made this task all the more challenging.

Lakhdar-Hamina's first films explore issues of national identity and the search for the Self in the context of postcolonial emancipation. In 1963, he wrote the script and dialogue for the film Under Neptune's sign. In 1965, he released his first long film, The Winds of the Aures. The film portrayed the story of an Algerian woman in search of her imprisoned sons during the Algerian war of independence.

The Winds of the Aures received the Best First Work Award at the 1966 Cannes Film Festival and was nominated for the Golden Palm. It was also nominated for the Grand Prix at the 5th Moscow International Film Festival in 1967. It may be considered in its own right the foundational stone of contemporary Algeria cinema. In The Winds of the Aures, Lakhdar-Hamina portrays with painstaking detail the disintegration of a peasant society marred by the structural violence of colonial occupation. The movie is clearly influenced by Soviet cinema and aesthetics, particularly that of Soviet Ukrainian director Alexander Dovzhenko. The director adeptly translated this influence on an Algerian scenario.

The Winds of the Aures consecrated Algerian cinema in the international scene. Lakhdar-Hamina's following film, Hassan Terro, explored in a comical manner the tragedy of Algeria's war of independence by portraying the misadventures of its main character, a bourgeois character trapped in the midst of the Algerian revolution.

North American audiences have remained for the most part unaware of Algeria's cinematographic experience. Following the nationalization of Algeria's film industry in June 1969, the American Motion Pictures Export Association of America (MPEAA) called for a boycott of all Algerian productions.

His third film December, released in 1972, explores the issue of torture. The movie narrated the case of a French officer troubled by the violent acts of torture perpetrated by the French army against members of the FLN.

Since its inception, Algerian cinema developed a clearly anti-imperialistic stance. In this regard, Algerian cinematographers in general and Lakhdar-Hamina in particular have remained deeply committed to the ideological tenets of the nonaligned movement and Third-worldism. In December 1973, African, Latin American, and Asian filmmakers gathered in Algiers for the first meeting of the Third World Cinema Committee, which became an effort to build an independent Third World cinematographic movement.

Chronicle of the Years of Fire (1975), however, is Lakhdar-Hamina's most important work. In 1975, he achieved worldwide recognition when the movie was awarded the Palme d'Or at Cannes. The film, which offers a personal vision of the Algerian revolution, traces the evolution of the revolutionary movement from 1939 until the beginnings of the 1954 insurrection against the French.

To this day, Chronicle of the Years of Fire remains the only African and Arab film to have been awarded the Palme D'or at Cannes. The movie is divided into six sections: "The Years of Ashes, "The Years of Embers", "The Years of Fire", "The Year of the Cart", "The Year of the Massacre" and "1 November 1954", a date that marks the beginning of the Algerian revolution and of the war of independence.

It tells the story of an Algerian peasant, Ahmad, who flees his village to escape famine and drought. The film presents violence as an unavoidable stage in the conflict between colonizer and colonized; in this regard, Lakhdar-Hamina chose to focus on the predicament of Algerian peasant communities and emphasized the gap that separated the rural Algerian peasantry from the wealthy French colonists. One of the movie’s main message appears to be that, just as violence begets more violence, so colonialism can only be fought through a violent uprising. The transformation of Ahmad from illiterate peasant to revolutionary leader symbolizes the maturation of an independent national consciousness aimed at national liberation.

From a cinematographic point of view, Chronicle makes use of camera techniques that emphasize feelings of uprootedness, deprivation, and suffering caused by a colonial system of exploitation. Characteristically, Lakhdar-Hamina consistently chose to portray the ideological debates surrounding the construction of a national identity amidst the violent struggle against colonial domination through the representation of a national collective represented by single heroic characters, such as Ahmad, or typical antiheroes such as Hassan Terro. Equally, the prominence of the peasant world in Lakhdar-Hamina’s filmography seems to consecrate rural life as one of the most important scenarios in the construction of national identity. This mythification of the Algerian peasantry as a repository of national pride and resistance would eventually be transformed during the 1980s, when Algerian cinema became more concerned with urban characters and focused on the crisis of postcolonial conflicts.

In Sand storm, released in 1982, Lakhdar-Hamina portrays the life of an isolated rural community fragmented by violence. It tells the story of Amara, a man whose wife gives birth to their eighth daughter; unable to withstand the dishonor of not fathering a son, Amara plans a revenge. The plot allows Lakhdar-Hamina to explore the difficult terrain of gender relations and gender violence.

== Filmography ==
| Year | Film | Genre | Role |
|---|---|---|---|
| 1959 | Our Algeria | Short film | Director Screenwriter |
| 1961 | La Voix du Peuple | Documentary Short film | Director Screenwriter |
| 1961 | Guns of Freedom | Short film | Director |
| 1961 | Yasmina | Short film Drama | Director Screenwriter |
| 1963 | Prends soin | Documentary Short film | Director Screenwriter |
| 1963 | Sous le signe de Neptune | Short | Screenwriter |
| 1964 | Mais un jour de novembre | Documentary | Director |
| 1966 | Rih al awras | Drama | Director Screenwriter |
| 1968 | Hassan, Terrorist | Comedy Drama | Director Screenwriter |
| 1973 | Décembre | Drama | Director Producer Screenwriter |
| 1975 | Chronicle of the Years of Fire | Drama History | Director Screenwriter |
| 1982 | Sandstorm | Drama | Director Screenwriter |
| 1986 | La dernière image | Comedy Drama | Director Producer Screenwriter |
| 2014 | Twilight of Shadows | Drama | Director Producer Screenwriter |

== Films presented at Cannes ==
| Year | Title | Contribution |
|---|---|---|
| 2014 | Crépuscule des ombres | Director; Script and Dialogue |
| 1992 | Automne | Director; Script and Dialogue |
| 1986 | La dernière image | Director; Script and Dialogue |
| 1982 | Vent de sable | Director; Script and Dialogue |
| 1975 | Chronique des années de braise (Chronicle of the Years of Fire) | Director; Script and Dialogue |
| 1967 | Le vent des Aurès (Rih al awras) | Director; Script and Dialogue; Cinematography |
| 1963 | Sous le signe de Neptune | Script and Dialogue |

== Awards ==
- 1975: Palme d'Or Chronicle of the Years of Fire, Long métrage
- 1967: Prix de la premiere oeuvre The Winds of the Aures, Long métrage

== Bibliography ==
- Boudjedra, Rachid. Naissance du Cinéma Algérien – 1971
- The Birth of Algerian Cinema: The Anti-Hero.’’ Alif: Journal of Comparative Poetics, no. 15 (1995): 260–266.
- Hafez, Sabry. "Shifting Identities in Maghrebi Cinema: The Algerian Paradigm. " Alif: Journal of Comparative Poetics, no. 15 (1995): 39–80.
- Pearson, Lyle. "Four Years of North African Film. " Film Quarterly 26, no. 4 (Summer, 1973): 18–26.
