= The Last Hour (1991 film) =

1991 film by William Sachs

- Directed by: William Sachs
- Written by: Jim Byrnes
- Produced by: Richard Sawyer; Carol M. Rossi; Steve Beswick
- Starring: Michael Paré; Shannon Tweed; Bobby Di Cicco; Danny Trejo
- Cinematography: Kent L. Wakeford
- Edited by: Maurie Beck; Kert Vander Meulen
- Music by: Garry Schyman
- Release date: 1991
- Running time: 85 minutes
- Country: United States
- Language: English

The Last Hour is a 1991 American action film directed by William Sachs, starring Michael Paré, Shannon Tweed and Bobby Di Cicco. It is also known under its alternative title Concrete War.

== Plot ==
Susan is married to Eric, a rich stockbroker. One day, she is kidnapped by the mafia, who want to blackmail Eric into giving them 5 million dollar he stole from them earlier. Eric teams up with Susan's ex-husband Jeff, who is a cop, to liberate Susan together.

== Production ==
William Sachs regarded the script as "a canvas" where he "could try all kinds of visual tricks and have fun". The film was released on video in many countries worldwide, starting in the US in October 1991, and in the UK in May 1992. It was particularly successful in Japan.

== Cast ==
- Michael Paré as Jeff
- Shannon Tweed as Susan
- Bobby Di Cicco as Lombardi
- Robert Pucci as Eric
- George Kyle as Petralli
- Danny Trejo as Spider
- Robert Miano as Frankie
- Raye Hollitt as Adler

== See also ==
- List of American films of 1991
