= Barzakh Editions =

Publishing house in Algeria

Barzakh Editions (French: Éditions Barzakh; Arabic: دار البرزخ للنشر) is an independent publishing house in Algeria. It publishes work of a new generation of Algerian writers. Barzakh within islam is the period between someone's death and his resurrection at the Last Judgment and the stay in the akhirah afterwards.

Barzakh was founded by Selma Hellal and Sofiane Hadjadj in the year of 2000, during the last years of the Algerian Civil War. In these years the conflicts in the country were greatly isolated from the world outside. According to the jury of the Prince Claus Awards in 2010, the foundation of this publishing house was elemental for opening the door again between Algeria and the rest of the world.

Initially, it had been the purpose to publish work of writers of Algerian soil only. Hellal and Hadjadj noticed though, that the civil war had caused that a great number of writers had fled abroad. For this reason the focus changed to publish work of authors that lived in exile as well as giving a chance to authors who otherwise probably wouldn't have had a chance.

An important mainspring for the founders was the passion for books and the trust that freedom of thought and of expression are essential for development.

Up to 2010 the house had published more than 110 books, varying mainly between novels and poetry. Furthermore, books have been published in areas like philosophy, photography, drama, politics, art, and more.

As from the start the house has been dependent from mainly European sponsors, because the circumstances and the nature of the publications caused that the publisher wasn't viable on itself. For instance the French embassy in Algiers had mercy on the cost for establishing copyrights for the books. Furthermore, the Swiss government and a number of funds offered financial support to the publisher.

In 2010 Barzakh Editions was honored with the Principal Prince Claus Award from the Netherlands. The jury praised it among other things for "giving concrete form to Algeria’s voices, for opening up a much needed space for critical reflection on Algerian realities, for building a bridge connecting different languages and cultures, and for creatively breaking through the threatening cultural isolation of the country."
