= List of American films of 1966 =

More than 180 American films were released in 1966.

A Man for All Seasons won the Academy Award for Best Picture.

== A–B ==
Title	Director	Cast	Genre	Note
10:30 P.M. Summer	Jules Dassin	Melina Mercouri, Romy Schneider, Peter Finch	Drama	Independent
7 Women	John Ford	Anne Bancroft, Sue Lyon, Margaret Leighton, Betty Field, Flora Robson, Mildred Dunnock, Eddie Albert	Drama	MGM
After the Fox	Vittorio De Sica	Peter Sellers, Britt Ekland, Victor Mature	Comedy	United Artists
Agent for H.A.R.M.	Gerd Oswald	Peter Mark Richman, Barbara Bouchet, Wendell Corey	Spy	Universal
Alfie	Lewis Gilbert	Michael Caine, Millicent Martin, Julia Foster, Jane Asher	Comedy/drama	Paramount
Alvarez Kelly	Edward Dmytryk	William Holden, Richard Widmark, Janice Rule	Western	Columbia
Ambush Bay	Ron Winston	Hugh O'Brian, Mickey Rooney, James Mitchum	War	United Artists
An American Dream	Robert Gist	Stuart Whitman, Janet Leigh, Eleanor Parker	Drama	Warner Bros.
And Now Miguel	James B. Clark	Michael Ansara, Guy Stockwell, Joe De Santis	Drama	Universal
Any Wednesday	Robert Ellis Miller	Jane Fonda, Jason Robards, Dean Jones	Comedy	Warner Bros.
The Appaloosa	Sidney J. Furie	Marlon Brando, John Saxon, Anjanette Comer	Western	Universal
Arabesque	Stanley Donen	Gregory Peck, Sophia Loren, Kieron Moore	Spy film	Universal
Around the World Under the Sea	Andrew Marton	Lloyd Bridges, Keenan Wynn, Gary Merrill, Shirley Eaton, David McCallum	Science fiction	MGM
Assault on a Queen	Jack Donohue	Frank Sinatra, Virna Lisi, Tony Franciosa, Richard Conte	Crime drama	Paramount
Batman	Leslie H. Martinson	Adam West, Burt Ward, Lee Meriwether, Cesar Romero, Burgess Meredith, Frank Gorshin	Comedy, action	20th Century Fox. Based on the TV series
Beau Geste	Douglas Heyes	Guy Stockwell, Doug McClure, Leslie Nielsen	Adventure	Universal
The Bible: In the Beginning	John Huston	George C. Scott, Ava Gardner, Peter O'Toole, John Huston, Richard Harris, Stephen Boyd, Franco Nero	Biblical drama	20th Century Fox
A Big Hand for the Little Lady	Fielder Cook	Henry Fonda, Joanne Woodward, Jason Robards, Kevin McCarthy, Burgess Meredith, Paul Ford	Western, comedy	Warner Bros.
Billy the Kid vs. Dracula	William Beaudine	John Carradine, Chuck Courtney, Virginia Christine	Western, horror	Embassy
Birds Do It	Andrew Marton	Soupy Sales, Tab Hunter, Doris Dowling	Comedy	Columbia
Blindfold	Philip Dunne	Rock Hudson, Claudia Cardinale, Jack Warden	Drama	Universal
Blood Bath	Stephanie Rothman, Jack Hill	Lori Saunders, Marissa Mathes, Sid Haig	Horror	AIP
Blowup	Michelangelo Antonioni	David Hemmings, Vanessa Redgrave, Sarah Miles	Thriller	MGM
The Blue Max	John Guillermin	George Peppard, James Mason, Ursula Andress, Karl Michael Vogler, Jeremy Kemp	War	20th Century Fox
Boy, Did I Get a Wrong Number!	George Marshall	Bob Hope, Elke Sommer, Phyllis Diller	Comedy	United Artists

== C–H ==
Title	Director	Cast	Genre	Note
Cast a Giant Shadow	Melville Shavelson	Kirk Douglas, Senta Berger, Yul Brynner, Frank Sinatra, Angie Dickinson, John Wayne	Action	Warner Bros.
Castle of Evil	Francis D. Lyon	Virginia Mayo, Scott Brady, Lisa Gaye	Horror	United Pictures
The Cat	Ellis Kadison	Roger Perry, Peggy Ann Garner, Barry Coe	Adventure	Embassy
Chamber of Horrors	Hy Averback	Patrick O'Neal, Cesare Danova, Laura Devon, Wilfrid Hyde-White	Horror	Warner Bros.
The Chase	Arthur Penn	Marlon Brando, Jane Fonda, Robert Redford, Angie Dickinson, E. G. Marshall, Janice Rule, James Fox, Robert Duvall	Drama	Columbia based on Horton Foote play; screenplay by Lillian Hellman; Remade as a 1991 film
Chelsea Girls	Andy Warhol, Paul Morrissey	Nico, Gerard Melanga, Ondine	Drama	
Country Boy	Joseph Kane	Randy Boone, Sheb Wooley, Majel Barrett	Musical	Howco
Curse of the Swamp Creature	Larry Buchanan	John Agar, Francine York, William McGhee	Horror	AIP
Cyborg 2087	Franklin Adreon	Michael Rennie, Karen Steele, Wendell Corey	Science fiction	United Pictures
The Daydreamer	Jules Bass	Paul O'Keefe, Ray Bolger, Hayley Mills, Patty Duke	Stop-motion animation	Embassy
Dead Heat on a Merry-Go-Round	Bernard Girard	James Coburn, Aldo Ray, Rose Marie	Crime	Columbia
Destination Inner Space	Francis D. Lyon	Scott Brady, Gary Merrill, Sheree North	Science fiction	United Pictures
Dimension 5	Franklin Adreon	Jeffrey Hunter, France Nuyen, Donald Woods	Spy/science fiction	United Pictures
Don't Worry, We'll Think of a Title	Harmon Jones	Rose Marie, Richard Deacon, Joey Adams	Comedy	United Artists
Dr. Goldfoot and the Girl Bombs	Mario Bava	Vincent Price, Fabian, Laura Antonelli	Comedy	AIP
Drop Dead Darling	Ken Hughes	Tony Curtis, Zsa Zsa Gabor, Lionel Jeffries	Comedy	Paramount
Duel at Diablo	Ralph Nelson	Sidney Poitier, James Garner, Bibi Andersson	Western	United Artists
El Dorado	Howard Hawks	John Wayne, Robert Mitchum, James Caan, Charlene Holt, Ed Asner, Michele Carey, Christopher George, Arthur Hunnicutt	Western	Paramount
The Endless Summer	Bruce Brown	Robert August, Mike Hynson	Documentary	
An Eye for an Eye	Michael D. Moore (as Michael Moore)	Robert Lansing, Patrick Wayne, Slim Pickens, Gloria Talbott	Western	Embassy
Fantastic Voyage	Richard Fleischer	Raquel Welch, Donald Pleasence, Stephen Boyd, Edmond O'Brien, Arthur Kennedy	Science fiction	20th Century Fox; won 2 Oscars
The Fat Spy	Joseph Cates	Phyllis Diller, Jack E. Leonard, Brian Donlevy, Jayne Mansfield	Comedy	Independent
The Fighting Prince of Donegal	Michael O'Herlihy	Peter McEnery, Susan Hampshire, Tom Adams	Adventure	Walt Disney
A Fine Madness	Irvin Kershner	Sean Connery, Joanne Woodward, Jean Seberg	Comedy, drama	Warner Bros. Based on Elliott Baker novel
Fireball 500	Leo Townsend	Frankie Avalon, Annette Funicello, Fabian	Comedy	AIP
Follow Me, Boys!	Norman Tokar	Fred MacMurray, Vera Miles, Lillian Gish, Kurt Russell	Comedy, drama	Disney
The Fortune Cookie	Billy Wilder	Walter Matthau, Jack Lemmon, Judi West	Comedy	United Artists. Oscar for Matthau, plus 3 more nominations
Frankie and Johnny	Fred de Cordova	Elvis Presley, Donna Douglas, Nancy Kovack, Harry Morgan, Sue Ane Langdon	Musical	United Artists. Based on the song
Funeral in Berlin	Guy Hamilton	Michael Caine, Paul Hubschmid, Oscar Homolka, Eva Renzi	Spy, thriller	Paramount. 2nd Harry Palmer series
A Funny Thing Happened on the Way to the Forum	Richard Lester	Zero Mostel, Phil Silvers, Michael Crawford, Jack Gilford, Michael Hordern, Roy Kinnear, Buster Keaton	Musical comedy	United Artists. Based on Broadway show; music by Stephen Sondheim; Oscar for music
Gambit	Ronald Neame	Michael Caine, Shirley MacLaine, Herbert Lom	Crime, comedy	Universal. 3 Oscar nominations; inspired 2012 remake
The Gentle Rain	Burt Balaban	Christopher George, Lynda Day George, Fay Spain	Drama	Allied Artists
The Ghost and Mr. Chicken	Alan Rafkin	Don Knotts, Dick Sargent, Liam Redmond	Comedy horror	Universal
The Ghost in the Invisible Bikini	Don Weis	Tommy Kirk, Nancy Sinatra, Basil Rathbone	Comedy	AIP
The Glass Bottom Boat	Frank Tashlin	Doris Day, Rod Taylor, Paul Lynde	Comedy	MGM
Grand Prix	John Frankenheimer	James Garner, Toshirō Mifune, Yves Montand, Eva Marie Saint, Brian Bedford, Jessica Walter	Sports, Drama	MGM; won 3 Oscars
The Group	Sidney Lumet	Candice Bergen, Joanna Pettet, Shirley Knight, Joan Hackett, Elizabeth Hartman, Jessica Walter	Drama	United Artists. Based on a novel by Mary McCarthy
Gunpoint	Earl Bellamy	Audie Murphy, Joan Staley, Warren Stevens	Western	Universal
Harper	Jack Smight	Paul Newman, Robert Wagner, Lauren Bacall, Janet Leigh, Julie Harris, Pamela Tiffin, Arthur Hill, Shelley Winters	Crime drama	Warner Bros. Based on Ross Macdonald novel
Hawaii	George Roy Hill	Julie Andrews, Max von Sydow, Richard Harris, Gene Hackman	Drama	United Artists. Based on James Michener novel, 7 Oscar nominations
Hold On!	Arthur Lubin	Peter Noone, Shelley Fabares, Sue Ane Langdon	Musical	MGM
Hot Rod Hullabaloo	William T. Naud	Marsha Mason, Val Bisoglio	Action	Allied Artists
How to Steal a Million	William Wyler	Audrey Hepburn, Peter O'Toole, Hugh Griffith, Charles Boyer	Crime, comedy	20th Century Fox

== I–R ==
Title	Director	Cast	Genre	Note
Incident at Phantom Hill	Earl Bellamy	Robert Fuller, Jocelyn Lane, Dan Duryea	Western	Universal
Is Paris Burning?	René Clément	Kirk Douglas, Charles Boyer, Leslie Caron, Glenn Ford, Yves Montand, Alain Delon, Jean-Paul Belmondo, Simone Signoret, Robert Stack, Orson Welles	Drama, war	Paramount; screenplay by Gore Vidal, Francis Ford Coppola; 2 Oscar nominations
Jesse James Meets Frankenstein's Daughter	William Beaudine	John Lupton, Narda Onyx, Estelita Rodriguez	Western horror	Embassy
Johnny Reno	R. G. Springsteen	Dana Andrews, Jane Russell, John Agar	Western	Paramount
Johnny Tiger	Paul Wendkos	Robert Taylor, Chad Everett, Geraldine Brooks	Western	Universal
Judith	Daniel Mann	Sophia Loren, Peter Finch, Jack Hawkins	Drama	Paramount
Kid Rodelo	Richard Carlson	Don Murray, Janet Leigh, Broderick Crawford	Western	Paramount
Kiss the Girls and Make Them Die	Henry Levin	Mike Connors, Dorothy Provine, Raf Vallone, Margaret Lee	Spy	Columbia
The Las Vegas Hillbillys	Arthur C. Pierce	Jayne Mansfield, Mamie Van Doren, Ferlin Husky	Comedy	Independent
The Last of the Secret Agents?	Norman Abbott	Marty Allen, Steve Rossi, Nancy Sinatra	Comedy	Paramount
Let's Kill Uncle	William Castle	Nigel Green, Mary Badham, Linda Lawson	Comedy horror	Universal
Lord Love a Duck	George Axelrod	Roddy McDowall, Tuesday Weld, Lola Albright	Comedy	United Artists
Lost Command	Mark Robson	Anthony Quinn, Claudia Cardinale, Alain Delon	War	Columbia; based on Jean Larteguy book
Lt. Robin Crusoe, U.S.N.	Byron Paul	Dick Van Dyke, Nancy Kwan, Akim Tamiroff	Comedy	Disney; based on the book Robinson Crusoe
Madame X	David Lowell Rich	Lana Turner, John Forsythe, Ricardo Montalbán	Drama	Universal
Made in Paris	Boris Sagal	Louis Jourdan, Ann-Margret, Richard Crenna	Comedy	MGM
A Man Called Adam	Leo Penn	Sammy Davis Jr., Ossie Davis, Cicely Tyson	Musical	Embassy
The Man Called Flintstone	Hanna-Barbera	Alan Reed, Mel Blanc (voices)	Animation	Columbia. Based on TV series
A Man Could Get Killed	Ronald Neame	James Garner, Sandra Dee, Melina Mercouri, Roland Culver	Spy	Universal
A Man for All Seasons	Fred Zinnemann	Paul Scofield, Wendy Hiller, Leo McKern, Orson Welles	Biography	Columbia; 6 Oscar won
Maya	John Berry	Clint Walker, Jay North, Sajid Khan	Drama	MGM
Mister Buddwing	Delbert Mann	James Garner, Suzanne Pleshette, Angela Lansbury	Drama	MGM
Moment to Moment	Mervyn LeRoy	Jean Seberg, Honor Blackman, Sean Garrison	Drama	Universal
Munster, Go Home!	Earl Bellamy	Fred Gwynne, Yvonne De Carlo, Al Lewis	Comedy	Universal. Based on TV series
Murderers' Row	Henry Levin	Dean Martin, Ann-Margret, Karl Malden, Camilla Sparv	Spy comedy	Columbia. Sequel to The Silencers
Nashville Rebel	Jay J. Sheridan	Waylon Jennings, Loretta Lynn	Musical	AIP
The Navy vs. the Night Monsters	Michael A. Hoey	Mamie van Doren, Anthony Eisley, Edward Faulkner	Science fiction	Realart
Nevada Smith	Henry Hathaway	Steve McQueen, Karl Malden, Brian Keith, Martin Landau	Western	Embassy; Paramount; based on characters created by Harold Robbins
The Night of the Grizzly	Joseph Pevney	Clint Walker, Martha Hyer, Keenan Wynn	Adventure	Paramount
Not with My Wife, You Don't!	Norman Panama	Tony Curtis, Virna Lisi, George C. Scott	Comedy	Warner Bros.
Namu, the Killer Whale	László Benedek	Robert Lansing, Lee Meriwether, Robin Mattson	Adventure	United Artists
Once Before I Die	John Derek	Ursula Andress, John Derek, Richard Jaeckel	War drama	Warner Bros.
The Oscar	Russell Rouse	Stephen Boyd, Elke Sommer, Jill St. John, Tony Bennett	Drama	Embassy; Paramount; 2 Oscar nominations
Our Man Flint	Daniel Mann	James Coburn, Lee J. Cobb, Gila Golan	Spy comedy	20th Century Fox
Out of Sight	Lennie Weinrib	Jonathan Daly, Karen Jensen, Robert Pine	Comedy	Universal
The Pad and How to Use It	Brian G. Hutton	Julie Sommars, James Farentino, Brian Bedford	Comedy	Universal
Paradise, Hawaiian Style	Michael D. Moore	Elvis Presley, James Shigeta, Donna Butterworth, Irene Tsu	Musical, Comedy	Paramount
Penelope	Arthur Hiller	Natalie Wood, Ian Bannen, Carl Ballantine	Comedy	MGM
Picture Mommy Dead	Bert I. Gordon	Don Ameche, Martha Hyer, Zsa Zsa Gabor	Horror	Embassy
The Plainsman	David Lowell Rich	Don Murray, Guy Stockwell, Abby Dalton	Western	Universal. Remake of 1936 film
The Poppy Is Also a Flower	Terence Young	Senta Berger, Stephen Boyd, Yul Brynner	Drama	made for TV
The Professionals	Richard Brooks	Burt Lancaster, Lee Marvin, Robert Ryan, Woody Strode	Western	Columbia. Based on novel by Frank O'Rourke; 3 Oscar nominations
Queen of Blood	Curtis Harrington	John Saxon, Dennis Hopper, Basil Rathbone, Judi Meredith	Science fiction	AIP
The Quiller Memorandum	Michael Anderson	George Segal, Alec Guinness, Max von Sydow	Spy	20th Century Fox
Rage	Gilberto Gazcón	Glenn Ford, Stella Stevens, David Reynoso	Drama	Columbia
The Rare Breed	Andrew V. McLaglen	James Stewart, Maureen O'Hara, Jack Elam	Western	Universal
Red Zone Cuba	Coleman Francis	John Carradine, Anthony Cardoza, Coleman Francis	Drama	Independent
Return of the Seven	Burt Kennedy	Yul Brynner, Warren Oates, Elisa Montes, Robert Fuller, Claude Akins	Western	United Artists. The Magnificent Seven sequel
Ride Beyond Vengeance	Bernard McEveety	Chuck Connors, Kathryn Hays, Bill Bixby	Western	Columbia
Ride in the Whirlwind	Monte Hellman	Jack Nicholson, Cameron Mitchell, Millie Perkins	Western	Independent
The Russians Are Coming, the Russians Are Coming	Norman Jewison	Alan Arkin, Eva Marie Saint, Jonathan Winters, Carl Reiner	Comedy	United Artists. Golden Globe Best Musical or Comedy; 4 Oscar nominations

== S–Z ==
Title	Director	Cast	Genre	Note
The Sand Pebbles	Robert Wise	Steve McQueen, Richard Crenna, Candice Bergen, Mako, Richard Attenborough, Simon Oakland, James Hong	War	20th Century Fox. Based on novel by Richard McKenna; 8 Oscar nominations
Savage Pampas	Hugo Fregonese	Robert Taylor, Ron Randell, Marc Lawrence	Western	Independent
Seconds	John Frankenheimer	Rock Hudson, Murray Hamilton, John Randolph, Salome Jens, Jeff Corey	Horror	Paramount
The Shooting	Monte Hellman	Warren Oates, Millie Perkins, Will Hutchins, Jack Nicholson	Western	Independent
The Silencers	Phil Karlson	Dean Martin, Stella Stevens, Daliah Lavi, Victor Buono, Nancy Kovack, Cyd Charisse	Spy comedy	Columbia; first Matt Helm film
The Singing Nun	Henry Koster	Debbie Reynolds, Ricardo Montalbán, Greer Garson	Musical	MGM. Based on life of Jeanine Deckers
Smoky	George Sherman	Fess Parker, Diana Hyland, Katy Jurado	Western	20th Century Fox
Spinout	Norman Taurog	Elvis Presley, Shelley Fabares, Carl Betz, Diane McBain, Deborah Walley, Dodie Marshall, Will Hutchins	Musical	MGM
Stagecoach	Gordon Douglas	Ann-Margret, Red Buttons, Alex Cord, Bing Crosby, Stefanie Powers, Bob Cummings, Slim Pickens	Western	20th Century Fox. Remake of 1939 film
The Swinger	George Sidney	Ann-Margret, Anthony Franciosa, Robert Coote	Comedy	Paramount
Tarzan and the Valley of Gold	Robert Day	Mike Henry, David Opatoshu, Nancy Kovack	Adventure	AIP
Texas Across the River	Michael Gordon	Dean Martin, Alain Delon, Joey Bishop	Western comedy	Universal
The Texican	Lesley Selander	Audie Murphy, Broderick Crawford, Diana Lorys	Western	Columbia
That Tennessee Beat	Richard Brill	Earl Richards, Lightnin' Chance, Dolores Faith	Musical	20th Century Fox
This Property Is Condemned	Sydney Pollack	Robert Redford, Natalie Wood, Charles Bronson	Drama	Paramount
Three on a Couch	Jerry Lewis	Jerry Lewis, Janet Leigh, Mary Ann Mobley	Comedy	Columbia
The Three Sisters	Paul Bogart	Sandy Dennis, Geraldine Page, Kim Stanley	Drama	Independent. Based on Anton Chekhov play
To the Shores of Hell	Will Zens	Marshall Thompson, Richard Arlen, Robert Dornan	War	Crown International
Torn Curtain	Alfred Hitchcock	Paul Newman, Julie Andrews, Lila Kedrova	Mystery	Universal
The Trouble with Angels	Ida Lupino	Rosalind Russell, Hayley Mills, June Harding	Comedy	Columbia
The Undertaker and His Pals	T. L. P. Swicegood	Ray Dannis, Warrene Ott, Rad Fulton	Horror	
The Ugly Dachshund	Norman Tokar	Suzanne Pleshette, Dean Jones, Charlie Ruggles	Comedy	Disney
The Unkissed Bride	Jack H. Harris	Tommy Kirk, Anne Helm, Jacques Bergerac	Comedy	Independent
Waco	R. G. Springsteen	Jane Russell, Howard Keel, Wendell Corey	Western	Paramount
Walk, Don't Run	Charles Walters	Cary Grant, Samantha Eggar, Jim Hutton	Comedy	Columbia. Grant's final film
Way...Way Out	Gordon Douglas	Jerry Lewis, Connie Stevens, Anita Ekberg, Robert Morley	Comedy	20th Century Fox
What Did You Do in the War, Daddy?	Blake Edwards	Dick Shawn, James Coburn, Carroll O'Connor	Comedy	United Artists
What's Up, Tiger Lily?	Woody Allen, Senkichi Taniguchi	Woody Allen, Louise Lasser, Tatsuya Mihashi	Comedy	AIP. Allen's first film
Who's Afraid of Virginia Woolf?	Mike Nichols	Elizabeth Taylor, Richard Burton, Sandy Dennis, George Segal	Drama	Warner Bros. Based on Edward Albee play; Oscars for Taylor, Dennis
The Wild Angels	Roger Corman	Peter Fonda, Nancy Sinatra, Bruce Dern	Drama	AIP
Wild Wild Winter	Lennie Weinrib	Gary Clarke, Chris Noel	Comedy	Universal
Winnie the Pooh and the Honey Tree	Wolfgang Reitherman	Sterling Holloway, Junius Matthews	Animation	Disney. Based on book by A. A. Milne
Women of the Prehistoric Planet	Arthur C. Pierce	Wendell Corey, Merry Anders, Irene Tsu	Science fiction	Independent
You're a Big Boy Now	Francis Ford Coppola	Peter Kastner, Elizabeth Hartman, Geraldine Page	Comedy	Warner Bros.

== See also ==
- List of 1966 box office number-one films in the United States
- AFI Catalog of Feature Films
- 1966 in the United States
