= Ruth Foster =

American actress (1920-2012)

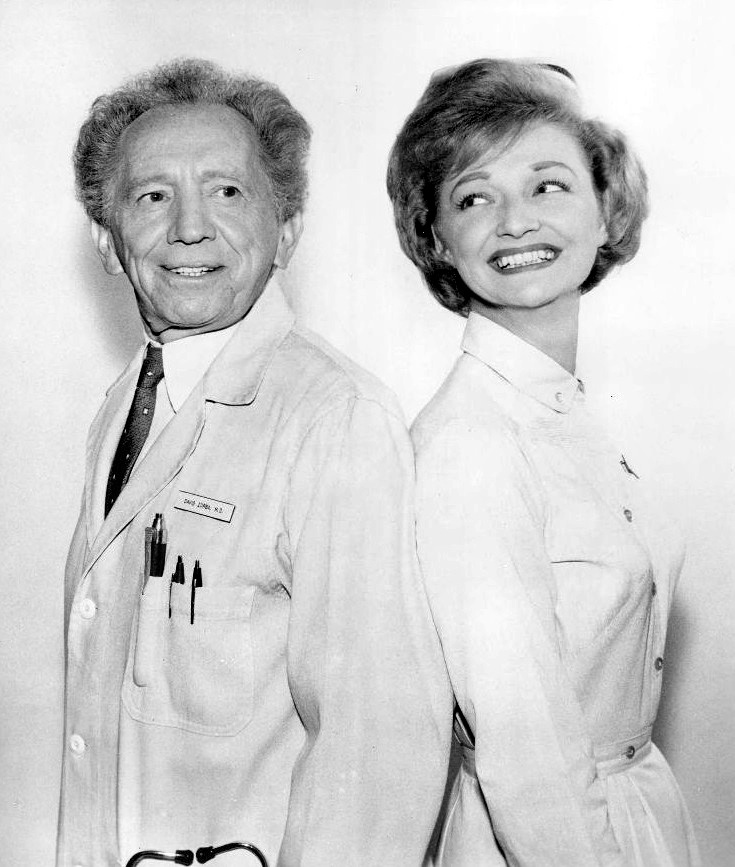
- Sam Jaffe and Foster on set of Ben Casey
- Born: January 29, 1920; Cincinnati, Ohio, US
- Died: May 12, 2012 (aged 92); Del Mar, California, US
- Occupation: Actress
- Spouse: Bobby Pinkus (m. 1939; died 1986)

Ruth E. Foster (January 29, 1920 – May 12, 2012) was an American actress who portrayed Walnut Grove's postmaster, also named Foster, for several seasons on the NBC TV series Little House on the Prairie (1974–1983).

== Life and career ==
Foster was born on January 29, 1920, in Cincinnati, Ohio, as Ruth Emma Foerstel, the first child of George and Helen Wilhelmy Foerstel. She first broke into show business at the age of 12 when the Shubert Theater sponsored a Fred Astaire and Ginger Rogers dance contest. Foster competed and won first place. This exposure lead to a job as a dancer with a traveling dance group. Soon, she was offered a job as a dancer for the Latin Quarter Show. After several years of dancing, Foster went on to become an actress.

She traveled with vaudeville dance troupes in the early 1930s. Foster was on Ben Casey as Miss Fleming from 1962 to 1964. She was in Dimension 5 and Cyborg 2087 that were going to be released on television as television films, instead were theatrically released across the United States. Foster is most remembered as Melinda Foster, the Post office manager, on Little House on the Prairie for 61 episodes from 1974 to 1983. She was also a film editor, video tape editor and an associate producer. In 1984, Foster reprised her role as Melinda Foster in the Made-for-TV-Movies Little House: Bless All the Dear Children and Little House: The Last Farewell. Foster danced professionally in the Palm Springs and Branson Follies until the age of 85.

== Personal life and death ==
Foster married comedian Bobby Pinkus, a.k.a. Peter J. Accardy, in 1939. Accardy died on September 16, 1986. Foster died of natural causes in Del Mar, California at the age of 92. Several Little House cast-mates attended her funeral services.

== Filmography ==
=== Acting ===
==== Film ====
Year	Title	Role	Notes
1966	Dimension 5	Grumpy Man's Wife	Science fiction/espionage or spy-fi film written by Arthur C. Pierce and directed by Franklin Adreon.
1966	Cyborg 2087	Citizen in Crowd	Science fiction film directed by Franklin Adreon and written by Arthur C. Pierce.

==== Television ====
Year	Title	Role	Notes
1954	The Spike Jones Show	Pickpocket	Episode: "Panel Shows" (S 1:Ep 2)
1962–64	Ben Casey	Miss Fleming	Recurring
1969	Bonanza	Woman on Street	Episode: "A Darker Shadow" (S 11:Ep 10)
1971	Medical Center	Nurse	Episode: "Web of Darkness" (S 2:Ep 17)
1974	Little House on the Prairie	Aunt Ruby	Episode: "Pilot"
1974–83	Little House on the Prairie	Melinda Foster	Recurring
1984	Little House: Bless All the Dear Children	Melinda Foster	Made-for-TV-Movie directed by Victor French & written by Chris Abbott-Fish and based on the Little House series of books by Laura Ingalls Wilder.
1984	Little House: The Last Farewell	Melinda Foster	Made-for-TV-Movie written & directed by Michael Landon and based on the Little House series of books by Laura Ingalls Wilder.
1989	Highway to Heaven	Woman #1	Episode: "The Reunion" (S 5:Ep 5)

=== Producing ===
==== Television ====
Year	Title	Role	Notes
1987	Fatal Confession: A Father Dowling Mystery	Associate producer	Made-for-TV-Movie directed by Christopher Hibler.

=== Editing ===
==== Documentaries ====
Year	Title	Role	Notes
1987	Paul Simon: Graceland – The African Concert	Film editor	Documentary concert given in Zimbabwe, Africa, by singer Paul Simon, featuring such South African musicians Miriam Makeba and Hugh Masakela directed by Michael Lindsay-Hogg.
1996	The Rolling Stones Rock and Roll Circus	Film editor	Documentary of a December 11, 1968 event organized by the Rolling Stones.

==== Film ====
Year	Title	Role	Notes
1991	The Object of Beauty	Film editor	Comedy crime–drama film directed by Michael Lindsay-Hogg.
1995	Frankie Starlight	Film editor	Drama–romantic war film directed by Michael Lindsay-Hogg with a screenplay written by Ronan O'Leary and Chet Raymo & based on the internationally best-selling novel The Dork of Cork by Raymo.

==== Television ====
Year	Title	Role	Notes
1983	The Littlest Hobo	Video tape editor	Episode: "Trucker" (S 5:Ep 5)
1985	American Playhouse	Film editor	Episode: "Breakfast with Les and Bess" (S 4:Ep 12)
1985	Great Performances	Film editor	Episode: "Grown-Ups" (S 13–Episode aired 25 November 1985)
1985	Master Harold...and the Boys	Film editor	Made-for TV-Movie drama by Athol Fugard, adapted from his 1982 play of the same title, directed by Michael Lindsay-Hogg.
1985	All the Way	Film editor	Made-for-TV-Movie directed by Michael Lindsay-Hogg.
1986–87	Matlock	Film editor	6 episodes
1987	Fatal Confession: A Father Dowling Mystery	Film editor	Credited as Ruth A. Foster.; Made-for-TV-Movie directed by Christopher Hibler.
1987	Jake and the Fatman	Film editor	Episodes: "Laura" (S 1:Ep 3); "Love for Sale" (S 1:Ep 5); "Love Me or Leave Me" (S 1:Ep 9)
1988	Tanner '88	Film editor	Created & written by Garry Trudeau and directed by Robert Altman.
1988	Tidy Endings	Film editor	Made-for-TV-Movie directed by Gavin Millar.
1988	The Christmas Wife	Film editor	Made-for-TV-Movie directed by David Jones and written by Catherine Ann Jones.
1988	Betrayal of Silence	Film editor	Made-for-TV-Movie directed by Jeffrey Woolnough.
1989	Glory! Glory!	Film editor	Televangelism comedy made-for-TV-Movie directed by Lindsay Anderson.
