= The Destructors (film) =

1968 film by Francis D. Lyon

- Theatrical release poster
- Directed by: Francis D. Lyon
- Written by: Arthur C. Pierce; Larry E. Jackson
- Produced by: Earle Lyon
- Starring: Richard Egan; Patricia Owens; John Ericson; Michael Ansara; Joan Blackman; David Brian
- Cinematography: Alan Stensvold
- Edited by: Robert S. Eisen
- Music by: Paul Dunlap
- Production company: United Pictures Corporation
- Distributed by: Feature Film Corp. of America
- Release date: January 1968
- Running time: 97 minutes
- Country: United States
- Language: English

The Destructors is a 1968 American science fiction film directed by Francis D. Lyon and written by Arthur C. Pierce and Larry E. Jackson. The film stars Richard Egan, Patricia Owens, John Ericson, Michael Ansara, Joan Blackman and David Brian. Filmed in 1966, the film was released in January 1968, by Feature Film Corp. of America.

== Cast ==
- Richard Egan as Dan Street
- Patricia Owens as Charlie
- John Ericson as Dutch Holland
- Michael Ansara as Count Mario Romano
- Joan Blackman as Stassa
- David Brian as Hogan
- Johnny Seven as Spaniard
- Khigh Dhiegh as King Chou Lai
- Gregory Morton as Dr. Frazer
- John Howard as Ernest Bushnell
- Michael Dugan as Parkhouse
- Jim Adams as Agent Wayne
- Eddie Firestone as Dr. Barnes
- Olan Soule as Mace
- Linda Kirk as Prissy
- Rick Traeger as Hans Gertmann
- King Moody as Patch
- Cal Currens as King's Bodyguard
- Jayne Massey as Operator Suzie
- Tom McDonald as Agent Dewey
- Horace Brown as Skipper
- Douglas Kennedy as General
- Walter Reed as Admiral
- James Seay as Secretary of Defense
