= United Pictures Corporation =

United Pictures Corporation (UPC) was an American film production company in the mid 1960s that produced nine modestly-budgeted action and science-fiction films originally intended for television. It became part of Commonwealth United Entertainment, which released the films theatrically.

== History ==
In 1966, UPC was created to produce color feature films aimed principally for the growing broadcast syndication and network television markets with the company originally funded by Canadian oil interests. The company believed that a well-mounted product with recognizable names in the cast, made at a modest price, would return a reasonable profit to the production company from the television markets alone. At that time feature films shot in colour were eagerly sought to be shown on television as opposed to the large backlog of black and white feature films. The majority of subject matter mostly comprised the then popular themes of science fiction and spy films and featured casts of recognizable and experienced actors whose names still held drawing power for both audience enjoyment and film funding.

The board of UPC comprised four people. Director Francis D. Lyon was in charge of production and directed five of their nine films. Earle Lyon, who was no relation to Francis, acted as executive producer. Both the Lyons met during the production of the Tales of Wells Fargo television series. Fred Jordan acted as another executive producer whilst Edmund Baumgarten, a former Bank of America motion picture loan officer and former president of Regal Pictures headed the company's business affairs. For screenwriters, UPC acquired Charles A. Wallace, who wrote four of UPC's films and science fiction writer Arthur C. Pierce who wrote four other UPC films. Paul Dunlap composed scores for seven of the films. Cinematographer Alan Stensvold photographed six of their films. Paul Sylos was art director for six of their films, Roger George provided special effects for five films, Robert S. Eisen edited five. UPC used several people who had worked for Republic Pictures; Franklin Adreon who directed two UPC films, R.G. Springsteen who directed one and stuntman Dale Van Sickel.

Originally UPC planned to do their own film distribution but financial backers of UPC saw the opportunity to reduce and redistribute costs by accepting a distribution deal and some financing from Harold Goldman Associates in exchange for a percentage of profits to go to Goldman's organisation. Goldman had created National Telefilm Associates in the mid 1950s. Besides being provided as second features to American cinemas, UPC provided their films to US military film exchanges and for overseas theatrical release. All but the first film UPC produced, Castle of Evil were sold to the CBS American television network.

UPC's first films Castle of Evil and Destination Inner Space were shot back to back in fourteen days in 1966 with Lyon stating "I don't recommend this hurried approach as a practice, because quality has to suffer."

== Filmography ==
- Castle of Evil (1966)
- Destination Inner Space (1966)
- Cyborg 2087 (1966)
- Dimension 5 (1966)
- The Money Jungle (1967)
- Two Crosses at Danger Pass (1967)
- Seven Pistols for a Massacre (1967)
- The Destructors (1968)
- Panic in the City (1968)
- The Girl Who Knew Too Much (1968)
- Tiger by the Tail (Shot in 1968, released in 1970)
