= Panic in the City =

1968 film by Eddie Davis

- Theatrical release poster
- Directed by: Eddie Davis
- Written by: Eddie Davis; Charles E. Savage
- Produced by: Earle Lyon
- Starring: Howard Duff; Linda Cristal; Nehemiah Persoff
- Cinematography: Alan Stensvold
- Edited by: Terry O. Morse
- Music by: Paul Dunlap
- Production company: United Pictures Corporation
- Distributed by: Feature Film Corp. of America
- Release date: October 1968
- Running time: 97 minutes
- Language: English

Panic in the City is a 1968 American science fiction thriller film directed by Eddie Davis and written by Davis and Charles E. Savage. Set and filmed on location in Los Angeles in 1967, its story deals with nuclear weapons. It stars Howard Duff, Linda Cristal, Stephen McNally, Nehemiah Persoff, Anne Jeffreys, Oscar Beregi Jr. and Gregory Morton. It was released in October 1968.

== Plot ==
An agent of the National Bureau of Investigation, Dave Pomeroy, investigates the death of a European nuclear scientist and discovers a Communist plot to detonate a nuclear bomb in Los Angeles in order to instigate World War III. Once the bomb is activated and Pomeroy receives a lethal dose of ionizing radiation from it, he sacrifices himself to save the city by flying the bomb out over the Pacific Ocean in a helicopter.

== Cast ==
- Howard Duff as Dave Pomeroy
- Linda Cristal as Dr. Paula Stevens
- Stephen McNally as James Kincade
- Nehemiah Persoff as August Best
- Anne Jeffreys as Myra Pryor
- Oscar Beregi Jr. as Dr. Paul Cerbo
- Gregory Morton as Steadman
- Dennis Hopper as Goff
- George Barrows as Ernest
- John Hoyt as Dr. Milton Becker
- Steve Franken as Hal Johnson
- Wesley Lau as Police Lieutenant Brady

== See also ==
- List of American films of 1968
