= The Creeping Terror =

1964 film by Vic Savage

- Title screen
- Directed by: Vic Savage (as A. J. Nelson)
- Written by: Robert Silliphant
- Produced by: Vic Savage (as A. J. Nelson)
- Starring: Vic Savage; Shannon O'Neil; William Thourlby; John Caresio
- Narrated by: Larry Burrell
- Cinematography: Andrew Janczak
- Edited by: Vic Savage (as A. J. Nelson)
- Music by: Frederick Kopp
- Production company: Metropolitan International Pictures
- Distributed by: Crown International Pictures
- Release date: November 20, 1964
- Running time: 77 minutes
- Country: United States
- Language: English

The Creeping Terror (a.k.a. The Crawling Monster) is a 1964 horror–science fiction film directed and produced by, and starring, Vic Savage. The plot is centered upon an extraterrestrial, slug-like creature that attacks and eats people whole in a small American town.

It is considered one of the worst films of all time.

== Plot ==
While driving along a highway in fictional Angel County in California, sheriff's deputy Martin Gordon and his wife Brett meet Martin's uncle, Sheriff Ben, and together they investigate a reported plane crash site. At the site, the group encounters the abandoned truck of a forest ranger, the ranger's hat and an alien spacecraft that resembles a camping trailer. A large, slow-moving, slug-like creature had earlier emerged from the craft and departed prior to the group's arrival. Believing that the absent ranger might be inside, Ben enters the craft by crawling underneath it. Shortly thereafter loud screams, along with growls like those of a lion, are heard from the craft, after which Martin radios for help.

In response to Martin's request for assistance, a special unit of military troops commanded by Col. James Caldwell and traveling in the back of a light-duty, civilian truck arrives at the site. Two of the troops enter the craft, examine its contents, and report back to Caldwell the presence inside of a large, tethered creature. The next day, "the world's leading authority on space emissions," Dr. Bradford, arrives to direct the ongoing investigation, which includes an examination of the creature and the spacecraft's analog devices. As the investigation proceeds, the departed creature stalks the countryside and, despite its markedly awkward and slow pace, successfully approaches, attacks and eats a bikini-clad girl, a housewife hanging laundry, a man and his grandson, picnickers at a hootenanny, several teenagers and couples in their cars at a lovers' lane.

Following the lover's lane incident, Caldwell orders his troops to attack the creature, telling Bradford that the creature should be captured alive if possible. Troops stand close together, walking slowly toward the creature as a unit, and fire their small caliber firearms. The attack proves ineffective and all but two of the troops are devoured. Caldwell then throws a grenade that kills the creature. After briefly examining the dead creature's tissue, Bradford hurriedly returns to the spacecraft and triggers an explosion there. Although the explosion mortally injures Bradford, it does not damage the craft or its instrumentation, and it allows the tethered creature to exit. As the creature prepares to devour Bradford, it is killed in a collision with Martin's arriving police car. Bradford explains to Martin and Brett that the creatures were "mobile" laboratories designed to consume human beings, analyze the bodies chemically to detect weaknesses and transmit the information from the spacecraft into outer space. Although Martin fails to destroy the spacecraft's transmitter equipment, the dying Bradford says that the creatures' home planet might not even exist anymore, concluding that "only God knows for sure."

== Cast ==
- Vic Savage as Martin Gordon
- Shannon O'Neil as Brett Gordon
- William Thourlby as Dr. Bradford
- John Caresio as Col. James Caldwell
- Brendon Boone as Barney the Deputy (credited as Norman Boone)
- Byrd Holland as Sheriff
- Jack King as Grandpa Brown
- Pierre Kopp as Bobby
- Louise Lawson as Blonde Girl in Gold Pants

== Production ==
The Creeping Terror was directed, produced and edited by Vic Savage under the alias of A. J. Nelson. (Note: Savage was born as Arthur Nelson White, and was sometimes known as Art J. Nelson and Arthur White.) Although Robert Silliphant is the credited writer, the original story was written by his younger brother Allan. Silliphant's other brother Stirling was a successful television writer, having written extensively for shows including Alfred Hitchcock Presents and Perry Mason, and he cocreated Naked City and Route 66. (Note: Stirling Silliphant would later write In the Heat of the Night, for which he received an Academy Award, The Poseidon Adventure and The Towering Inferno, among other films.) Savage used this familial association to attract potential investors for the film. Savage reportedly offered these investors small parts in the film.

When interviewed by director Pete Schuermann for The Creep Behind the Camera (aka Creep!) (2014), a docudrama film about the making of The Creeping Terror, Allan Silliphant claimed he was paid $1,500 by Savage. Following this payment, Silliphant returned three days later with the original nine-page film treatment that he had written based only on an earlier, vague idea for the story. Later in the production, there was conflict between writer and director, with Silliphant frustrated that Savage did not share his vision that the story was intended to be outrageous. This conflict, and Silliphant's belief that the film would harm, rather than enhance, his family's reputation, especially that of his brother Stirling, ultimately led to his departure from the production.

Principal photography began in late 1962, but instead of shooting at scenic Lake Tahoe as Silliphant had expected, a muddy pond at Spahn Ranch in Simi Valley, California was used. When the film's special-effects creator was not paid for his work, he allegedly stole the original creature costume on the day before shooting was to commence, forcing Savage and his remaining crew to assemble a poorly constructed replica. In John Stanley's Revenge of the Creature Features Movie Guide (1988), the resultant creature is described as "...an elongated alien monster resembling a clumsy shag rug..." Because of Savage's difficulties in securing financing, filming was episodic and did not conclude until 1963. (Note: The opening credits were created by Richard Edlund who would later work on visual effects for major films such as Star Wars (1977), Raiders of the Lost Ark (1981) and Ghostbusters (1984).)

There is minimal dialogue in the film, with nearly all vocalization provided in expository format by a narrator. The exact cause of the missing dialogue is uncertain. Savage may have filmed scenes without regard to the professional quality of the sound, the sound might have been improperly transferred (or not transferred at all, as a cost-saving measure) to 35mm mag stock or the original soundtracks were lost. Unable to fund basic sound transfers or extensive post-production dubbing, Savage hired Larry Burrell, a radio news reader whose other film credits include They Saved Hitler's Brain and the nudie cutie Not Tonight Henry, to narrate the entire film. Although a minor amount of poor-quality redubbing was performed, the narrator speaks over most of the dialogue in the film, and long intervals devoid of dialogue have no narration, similar in style to many educational films produced in the 1950s and 1960s.

Savage quickly edited the film with a silent picture-only Moviola. Prior to the film's release, Savage was repeatedly sued, and, facing a possible indictment on charges of fraud, he vanished. He would never again become involved in film production, and he reportedly died of liver failure in 1975 at the age of 41. In 2009, Savage's wife Lois wrote a novel based on her life with him.

== Release/Reception ==
The Creeping Terror was completed in 1964 and nominally distributed by Crown International Pictures. With Savage having disappeared, the main financier William Thourlby (who appears in the film as Dr. Bradford) acquired the remaining film stock and commissioned the creation of an edited version in an attempt to recoup some of his investment. As sound reels for a later portion of the film were missing, Thourlby added constant and occasionally intrusive narration.

Because The Creeping Terror would not be suitable for wide release and would, at best, have been relegated to drive-in theaters and second-run showings, it was sold in 1976 as part of a syndication package of films for local television stations. In 1994, The Creeping Terror was featured in Episode #606 of Mystery Science Theater 3000; the cast, crew and viewers of the program became noted critics of the film. TV Guide described The Creeping Terror as "pure camp," and claimed that it might be the second-worst horror film ever made, behind only Plan 9 from Outer Space. One review noted the film’s technical incompetence (like the carpet-like monster) and bizarre production history as sources of its morbid charm.

== See also ==
- List of films considered the worst
- List of films featuring extraterrestrials
