= Castle of Evil =

1966 American horror film directed by Francis D. Lyon

- Theatrical release poster
- Directed by: Francis D. Lyon
- Written by: Charles A. Wallace
- Produced by: Earle Lyon
- Starring: Scott Brady; Virginia Mayo; David Brian; Lisa Gaye; Hugh Marlowe; William Thourlby
- Cinematography: Brick Marquard
- Music by: Paul Dunlap
- Production company: United Pictures Corporation
- Distributed by: World Entertainment Corp.
- Release date: September 1, 1966 (Florida)
- Running time: 81 minutes
- Country: United States
- Language: English

Castle of Evil is a 1966 American horror film directed by Francis D. Lyon and written by Charles A. Wallace. It stars Scott Brady, Virginia Mayo, David Brian, Lisa Gaye, Hugh Marlowe and William Thourlby. The film tells the story of a dead scientist who, with the help of his long-time housekeeper and a robot, seeks revenge from beyond the grave on the person who murdered him.

Castle of Evil was released by World Entertainment Corp. as the first movie on a double bill with the black-and-white British science fiction film Blood Beast from Outer Space (1965).

== Plot ==
The undertaker Muchado has been called to Castle Montego by housekeeper Lupe Tekal d'Esperanza because of the death of her employer, the reclusive scientist Kovic. But Muchado had discovered that Kovic was not quite dead yet. He prepared the body anyway and now demands twice his usual fee. Lupe pays him, poisons him and disposes of his body in a disintegrator chamber in the castle's secret laboratory.

A boat arrives at the castle, on an island near Nassau, with six people: Matt Granger, Sable, Robert Hawley, Carrol, Doc Corozal and Tunki. Kovic had offended each of them and wants to make amends. Lupe announces to their surprise that Kovic is dead. His body is in an open coffin; his face horribly disfigured from a lab accident. She tells them Kovic wanted to leave his estate to them, but as she reads the preamble to his will in a séance-like ceremony, Kovic's face appears and tells them that one of them has murdered him. They are to find the murderer, whose portion of the estate will be split between the remaining five. Each portion is more than $400,000.

Kovic made his fortune controlling silver mines that belonged to the island's natives, of whom Tunki is one. Doc, also a native, went to the US to be educated and has therefore left behind the voodoo superstitions Tunki still believes in. Tunki plans to "restore to my people" the mines now that Kovic is dead. Kovic had stolen the mines to "rise above the stigma of his father's insanity" and was a "borderline case" of criminal insanity himself, Matt says.

The castle has closed-circuit television so Lupe can see into each room. In the lab, she keeps what appears to be Kovic's body, standing to attention and unmoving.

Robert, the attorney who helped Kovic steal the mines, accuses Lupe of murdering Kovic. Lupe "activates" the Kovic in the lab and sends him to kill Robert. But that Kovic is not the real Kovic, as his body still lies in its coffin. None of the remaining five people know what the Kovic from the lab is.

They assemble in a room without Carrol and Lupe. Carrol suddenly screams and faints. When she awakens, Lupe is apparently dead on the floor next to her. Carrol says she saw Kovic kill Lupe. Matt stops Tunki from stabbing Lupe's body, which Tunki believes will ensure that the "evil that lives on after death" goes away.

Doc finds that Lupe is not dead but says she will not live long. Lupe says that the Kovic in the lab is a robot the real Kovic made in his image, complete with facial scarring. Its "brain is a computer filled with all the evil that was in Kovic." She confesses that she killed Kovic for his money, and then tried to reprogram the robot to kill the others but failed. The robot is now "beyond control." Lupe dies.

Matt and Tunki discover the closed-circuit TV system and find the secret laboratory. In the lab, the find a large laser gun, but no robot.

The robot attacks Doc, Sable and Carrol. It knocks Doc unconscious and is about to strangle Sable when Carrol runs away. The robot follows her. Matt checks the TV system and sees Carrol in the lab just as the robot bursts in. Matt shoots the robot with the laser gun, destroying it.

== Cast ==
- Scott Brady as Matt Granger
- Virginia Mayo as "Sable"
- David Brian as Robert Hawley
- Lisa Gaye as Carrol
- Hugh Marlowe as "Doc" Corozal
- William Thourlby as "Kovic"
- Ernest Sarracino as "Tunki"
- Natividad Vacío as "Muchado"
- Shelley Morrison as Lupe Tekal d'Esperanza

== Production ==
Castle of Evil was produced by United Pictures Corporation and National Telefilm Associates.

The film's working title was The Haunting of Castle Montego. Principal photography began on 11 November 1965 at Producers Studio in Los Angeles.

United Picture Corporation's first films, Castle of Evil and Destination Inner Space, were shot back to back in 14 days. Director Francis D. Lyon said, "I don't recommend this hurried approach as a practice, because quality has to suffer."

== Release ==
Castle of Evils opened regionally in Orlando, Florida on September 1, 1966. This was followed by openings in Los Angeles in mid-March 1967 and New York City in early October 1967. However, the film was licensed by World Entertainment Corp. to 13 television stations in "several western states" months before it opened in theaters across the United States.

The film was the first feature on a double bill with Blood Beast from Outer Space. American critic Bryan Senn writes the reason that "the awful (but color) Castle of Evil" ran first is because Blood Beast from Outer Space was "shot in moody black and white when, at the time, even low-budget efforts were almost invariable in color."

Castle of Evil was given an X-certification by the British Board of Film Classification (BBFC) on July 1, 1970. It was the same day that the BBFC raised the minimum age to 18 for exhibiting X-cert films to audience members; prior to then, the minimum age had been 16. No footage is known to have been cut from the film in order to obtain the certification necessary for it to be shown in the UK.

The exhibitor's manual for Castle of Evil and Blood Beast from Outer Space describes the double bill as the "Twin Shock Show With That Big Box-Office Punch!"

== Distribution ==
World Entertainment Corp. distributed Castle of Evil in the US. It was distributed in the UK by Compton Films Ltd.

The film aired repeatedly on US television during the 1970s. For example, in New York City, it was shown on WNEW Ch.5 at 1:00 pm Saturday 27 December 1975; and on WPIX Ch.11 at 6:00 pm on 29 February 1976, a week later at 8:00 pm on 6 March 1976, and at 2:00 am on Wednesday 9 May 1979.

== Reception ==
Few critics have written about Castle of Evil. British Critic Phil Hardy calls the movie a "tedious film" in which "A murderer's robot (...) is programmed to kill the members of the trio responsible for disfiguring the scientist before his death." And "The climax sees Brady gunning down the robot with a laser gun found in the laboratory."

Clive Davies, a British critic, writes that "This kind of senseless horror with old dark house mystery trappings is not very good, but is strangely enjoyable." He, too, makes note of the film's "robotic electronic clone" of Kovic, the laser gun and "A gas chamber in the basement [that] turns people into skeletons instantly."

Another American critic, Kristie Hanssen, describes the plot of Castle of Evil as "A bunch of hopeful heirs arrives on an isolated island to hear the will of a horribly scarred, mad scientist." Besides finding the person who caused Kovic's disfigurement, they must "also survive the rampages of a robot the scientist made in his own image."

== See also ==
- List of American films of 1966
