= Natividad Vacío =

American actor

Natividad Vácio
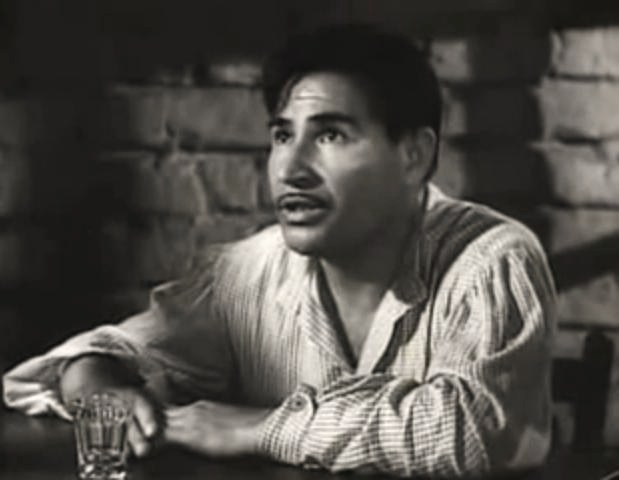
- in The Hitch-Hiker (1953)
- Born: September 8, 1912; El Paso, Texas, U.S.
- Died: May 30, 1996 (aged 83); Burbank, California, U.S.
- Years active: 1950–1989

José Natividád Domínguez Vacio (September 8, 1912 – May 30, 1996) was an American character actor and musician.

== Early life ==
Vacío was born to Mexican parents in El Paso, Texas in 1912, and was raised in Pasadena, California. He befriended George Reeves while the two were classmates at Pasadena Junior College. Reeves loved to hear "Nati", Vacío's nickname, sing and play his guitar. Reeves asked Nati to show him how to play. Reeves was a quick learner and both of them would play and sing Mexican songs, all the time. The two both took acting lessons at the Pasadena Playhouse.

Vacío served in the US Army during World War II, reaching the rank of Corporal.

== Career ==
Vacío's debut came in a 1950 episode of The Lone Ranger called "Dead Man's Chest". He was featured in a pivotal role in The Hitch-Hiker (1953), a film noir directed by Ida Lupino. Many of his roles were in Westerns, although he had a diverse career. For example, he played a character called "Frank Smith" who was the family gardener in five episodes of the suburban sitcom Father Knows Best (the character—and therefore the Andersons—pronounced his first name as "Frahnk," so the credits generally spelled it phonetically as "Fronk"). He appeared alongside his friend George Reeves on Adventures of Superman, playing the role of a Mexican police inspector in the 1958 episode "The Brainy Burro".

The majority of his work was in television, with an occasional movie role. Perhaps the highest-profile film in which he appeared was The Magnificent Seven (1960), portraying "Miguel", one of the Mexican townspeople trying to defend their farming village from a band of outlaws. In 1988, he appeared in the Robert Redford film The Milagro Beanfield War (1988) where he portrayed "Onofre", a man with one arm, who said his arm was eaten off by butterflies. He was one of the four men they called the "senile brigade".

== Personal life ==
Vacío was married to Henriqueta (Queta) Vacío.

=== Death ===
He died in Burbank, California, aged 83, on 30 May 1996.

== Media portrayals ==
Vacío is a minor character in the film Hollywoodland (2006), a film about George Reeves' life and death. He is portrayed by Diego Fuentes.

== Filmography ==
Year	Title	Role	Notes
1948	The Loves of Carmen	Man	Uncredited
1950	Branded	Peon	Uncredited
1953	Jeopardy	Persistent Tijuana Vendor	Uncredited
1953	The Hitch-Hiker	Jose	
1953	Latin Lovers	Vacuum Cleaner Man	(scenes deleted)
1954	Green Fire	Hernandez	
1955	Stranger on Horseback	Morales	Uncredited
1956	Walk the Proud Land	Compos	Uncredited
1956	Giant	Eusebio	Uncredited
1957	The Night the World Exploded	Hospital Physician	Uncredited
1957	Father Knows Best	Frank	
1957	Escape from Red Rock	Don Miguel Chavez	
1958	Father Knows Best	Frank	
1960	The Magnificent Seven	Miguel	
1963	The Gun Hawk	Quid	
1964	Honeymoon Hotel	Vagrant at Garbage Dump	Uncredited
1966	Castle of Evil	Muchado	
1968	The Pink Jungle	Figueroa	
1970-1973	Adam-12	Jose / Mr. Perez	2 episodes
1972	Skyjacked	Spanish Passenger	Uncredited
1980	Cheech and Chong's Next Movie	Mexican Man in Welfare Office	
1983	The Man with Two Brains	Ramon	
1988	Milagro Beanfield War	The Senile Brigade	
