= Robert Phillips (actor) =

American actor (1925–2018)

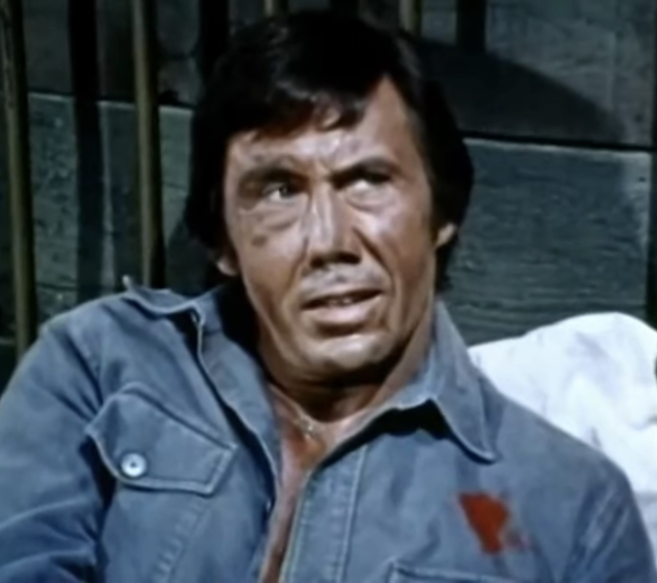
- Phillips in Dusty's Trail, 1973
- Born: Robert R. Phillips; April 10, 1925; Chicago, Illinois, U.S.
- Died: November 5, 2018 (aged 93)
- Occupation: Actor
- Years active: 1953–1997

Robert R. Phillips (April 10, 1925 – November 5, 2018) was an American film and television actor.

== Life and career ==
Phillips was born in Chicago, Illinois. He was a self-defense instructor while serving in the U.S. Marine Corps during World War II and later played football for the Chicago Bears and the Washington Redskins. Phillips was also a police officer in the Los Angeles Police Department and Illinois State Police. He was a personal bodyguard for the 31st Governor of Illinois, Adlai Stevenson II.

Phillips began his film and television career in the 1950s, when a film producer suggested he should become an actor, and gave him a role in a film, and the TV series Tightrope! was based on aspects of his life.

Phillips retired as a police officer after being injured while working undercover, and attended acting school in the early 1950s. Phillips was hired by studios as a minder for Lee Marvin, to prevent him getting into fights after hours. He appeared in two films with actor Richard Jaeckel: The Gun Runners (1958) and The Dirty Dozen (1967).

His other film roles included appearances in The Killers (1964) and Cat Ballou (1965), Dimension 5 (1966), Hour of the Gun (1967), Mackenna's Gold (1969), Slaughter (1972), The Slams (1973), I Escaped from Devil's Island (1973), The Dion Brothers (1974), Capone (1975, as Bugs Moran), Mitchell (1975), Mean Johnny Barrows (1975), The Killing of a Chinese Bookie (1976) and Walking Tall: Final Chapter (1977).

Phillips also guest-starred in numerous television programs including Star Trek: The Original Series (in the episode "The Cage"), Gunsmoke, The Rockford Files, Bonanza, The Dukes of Hazzard, The Wild Wild West, Rawhide, Mission: Impossible, The High Chaparral, Mannix, The Fall Guy and Planet of the Apes. His last credit was for the western television series Bordertown.

== Death ==
Phillips died November 5, 2018, at the age of 93.

== Filmography ==
Year	Title	Role	Notes
1953	Code Two	Henchman	Uncredited
1956	UFO (1956 film)	Edward J. Ruppelt	
1958	The Gun Runners	Outlaw	Uncredited
1962	Hell Is for Heroes	Jeep driver	
1964	The Killers	George Fleming	
1965	Cat Ballou	Klem	Uncredited
1966	The Silencers	1st Armed Man	
1966	Dimension 5	George	
1967	The Dirty Dozen	Corporal Morgan	
1967	Hour of the Gun	Frank Stilwell	
1969	Mackenna's Gold	Monkey	
1970	Darker than Amber	Griff	
1972	Slaughter	Frank	
1973	The Student Teachers		
1973	Detroit 9000	Captain Chalmers	
1973	The Slams	Cohalt	
1973	I Escaped from Devil's Island	Blassier	
1974	The Dion Brothers	Gino	
1975	Capone	Bugs Moran	
1975	Mitchell	Chief Albert Pallin	
1975	Mean Johnny Barrows	Ben	
1975	Adios Amigo	Notary	
1976	The Killing of a Chinese Bookie	Phil	
1977	The Car	Metcalf	
1977	Walking Tall: Final Chapter	Johnny	
1977	Telefon	Highway Patrolman #1	
1984	Delta Pi	Pud	
1987	Cry Freedom	Speaker at Funeral	
1997	A Time to Revenge	Billy Two Feathers	(final film role)
