= Angel's Flight (film) =

1965 American thriller film

- film poster
- Directed by: Raymond Nassour; K.W. Richardson
- Written by: Dean Romano; William Brownell
- Produced by: William L. Thourlby; T.O. Luth
- Starring: Indus Arthur; William Thourlby
- Cinematography: Glen Gano
- Edited by: John Bushelman
- Music by: Jaime Mendoza-Nava
- Production company: Bad Axe Productions
- Distributed by: State Rights; Crown International
- Release date: 1965
- Running time: 75 mins
- Country: United States
- Language: English

Angel's Flight is a 1965 late-entry film noir thriller film, starring Indus Arthur and William Thourlby. The film was directed by Raymond Nassour and Kenneth W. Richardson.

== Plot ==
Former reporter Ben Wiley lives in a rundown hotel, spending his every waking moment in an alcoholic stupor. One night he stumbles into "Liz," a young blonde woman who reminds him of Misha, his dead wife. During their brief encounter, he does not realize that Liz had just used a razor to murder a man.

While at the Angels Flight Café, Jake the bartender reveals that the "Bunker Hill killer" had struck again. Ben decides to solve the serial killings in the hopes of reviving his career as a journalist. He reaches out to his friend Pete Johnson, a detective with the LAPD. Ben discovers that Liz is an exotic dancer who suffers from psychological damage from having been raped, and that she lures handsome men to their deaths in order to exact punishment for her trauma.

After Ben takes Liz to the back-alley stairway where she had been assaulted and exposes the reasoning behind her crimes, she flees. The film culminates in Liz leaping to her death from the Angels Flight funicular railway.

== Cast ==
- Indus Arthur as "Liz"
- William Thourlby as Ben Wiley
- Michael Fox as Jake the Bartender
- Rhue McClanahan as Dolly
- Ann Richards as Cece Lamont, Title Song (Singer)
- John Bliss as Sergeant
- Kathleen Gallant
- Warren Kimmerling
- Elliot Fayad
- Jayne Drennan
- James Mastin
- Lawrence Homer
- Jean Cartwright
- Edward P. Martin
- Clint Prentice
- James Cavanaugh
- John Walker
- Burt Conroy
- Majel Hellings
- Grace Adair
- Gaye Merritt
- Marie Allyn
- Ava Janey
- Steven Volz
- Tiger Joe Marsh
- Katherine Luth
- Henry Morley
- Connie Tilles as Woman on Angel's Flight (uncredited)

== Production ==
Angel's Flight was written by Dean Romano, with additional dialogue by William Brownell. The directors were Raymond Nassour and K.W. Richardson.

Produced by William L. Thourlby, T.O. Luth (executive producer).John Bushelman served as associate producer and editor. Bennett Elzey is listed as assistant to the producer. James Kelly was the production manager, while Jay Lawrence was the production supervisor. Sandra Richardson was the script supervisor. June Franklin was the production coordinator.

Glen Gano was the director of photography, with Miles Dickson as the assistant director. Byrd Holland served as the Art Director. Rob Coulter was the set designer, and Tom Willsey served as the property master. Dona Morris was the makeup artist. Norbert Jobst was in charge of the wardrobe.

The music was composed by Jaime Mendoza-Nava. Theodore Keep was the sound mixer, and Monty Pearce was credited for the sound effects.

It is uncertain whether or not the film was theatrically released in the 1960s. A re-edited version with a newly filmed wrap-around story reportedly played in Midwestern drive-ins under the name "Shock Hill," and was distributed by Crown International.

=== Locations ===
Principal photography took place during the summer of 1962. The film takes place in and around Bunker Hill, a neighborhood of Downtown Los Angeles. Bunker Hill was used as a location in over a hundred films spanning the 1920s-1960s. It featured heavily in many film noir titles, including Criss Cross (1949), M (1951), The Turning Point (1952), and Kiss Me Deadly (1956).

The crew reportedly shot the film without permits, which resulted in the apparent production shut down by the Los Angeles Police Department. During filming, buildings in Bunker Hill was being razed in order to make room for new development.

The landmark Angels Flight funicular railway provides the setting of the film's climax, from which the film derives its title.

The scene where "Liz" performs her dance act was filmed The Other Ball, a club located in San Gabriel, northeast of Los Angeles.

== Reception ==
A digitized version of the film was shown at a Los Angeles film noir festival at Hollywood's Egyptian Theater in 2005. KCET, Los Angeles' Public Television affiliate, aired the film as part of its coverage of the reopening of Angels Flight.
