= Cyborg 2087 =

1966 film by Franklin Adreon

- VHS video cover (UK version)
- Directed by: Franklin Adreon
- Written by: Arthur C. Pierce
- Produced by: Earle Lyon
- Starring: Michael Rennie; Karen Steele; Wendell Corey; Warren Stevens
- Edited by: Frank P. Keller
- Music by: Paul Dunlap
- Production company: Harold Goldman Associates
- Distributed by: United Pictures Corporation
- Release date: October 1966
- Running time: 86 minutes
- Country: United States
- Language: English

Cyborg 2087 is a 1966 science fiction film directed by Franklin Adreon and written by Arthur C. Pierce. The film stars Michael Rennie, Karen Steele, Wendell Corey, and Warren Stevens.

== Plot ==
In 2087, free thought is illegal and the population is controlled by governments. A small band of free thinkers sends Garth A7, a cyborg, back in time to 1966 to prevent Professor Sigmund Marx from revealing his new discovery. The discovery will eventually make mind control possible and create a tyranny in Garth's time. He is pursued by two "Tracers" (also cyborgs) sent by the government to stop him.

Garth enlists the help of Dr. Sharon Mason, Marx's assistant. He gets her to summon her friend, local biologist Dr. Zeller, to remove a homing device used by the Tracers to track him. The local sheriff, police, and newspaper editor also become involved.

Garth defeats the Tracers and convinces Professor Marx to keep his discovery secret. Then, with his future wiped out as a result, Garth ceases to exist; the people who helped him do not even remember him.

== Cast ==
- Michael Rennie as Garth
- Karen Steele as Dr. Sharon Mason
- Wendell Corey as The Sheriff
- Warren Stevens as Dr. Zeller
- Eduard Franz as Professor Sigmund Marx
- Harry Carey Jr. as Jay "Jay C"
- Dale Van Sickel as Tracer #1
- Troy Melton as Tracer #2
- John Beck as "Skinny"
- Adam Roarke as Deputy Dan

== Reception ==
TV Guide rated it 1/5 stars and wrote that it is "an honest attempt make a statement, but it is poorly executed". The Encyclopedia of Science Fiction noted the similarities between this film and Terminator 2: Judgment Day. It said that while the movie had a better grasp of time travel paradoxes than other movies of the era, that the performances were weak. DVD Talk found that while the movie was cheap, it was better than its reputation.

== Production ==
It was part of a series of nine low-budget films produced by United Pictures Corporation. The films were intended for TV distribution, but they had theatrical releases. The writer and director's next film, Dimension 5, also featured time travel. The budget was $100,000 in 1966.

== Home media ==
It was remastered and released on Blu-Ray in 2017. It was released in the United Kingdom with minor cuts, reducing the run time by two minutes.

== See also ==
- List of American films of 1966

== Sources ==
- Green, Paul (2014). Jeffrey Hunter, the Film, Television, Radio, and Stage Performances. Jefferson, North Carolina: McFarland & Company. pp. 120–121. ISBN 978-0786478682.
