= The Money Jungle =

1968 film by Francis D. Lyon

- Theatrical release poster
- Directed by: Francis D. Lyon
- Written by: Charles A. Wallace
- Produced by: Harold Goldman; Earle Lyon
- Starring: John Ericson; Lola Albright; Leslie Parrish; Nehemiah Persoff; Charles Drake; Kent Smith; Don Rickles
- Cinematography: Alan Stensvold
- Music by: Paul Dunlap
- Production company: United Pictures Corporation
- Distributed by: Commonwealth United Entertainment
- Release date: February 1968
- Running time: 95 minutes
- Country: United States
- Language: English

The Money Jungle is a 1968 American drama film directed by Francis D. Lyon and written by Charles A. Wallace. The film stars John Ericson, Lola Albright, Leslie Parrish, Nehemiah Persoff, Charles Drake, Kent Smith and Don Rickles. The film was released in February 1968, by Commonwealth United Entertainment.

== Plot ==
With five rival oil companies vying for offshore rights, their chief geologists begin dying under suspicious circumstances. A troubleshooter, Blake Heller, is brought in by one firm to investigate, resulting in almost immediate attempts on his life as well.

Heller takes a particular interest in two women, one a neighbor, Treva Saint, who has stock holdings in his oil company, and Peggy Lido, a nightclub singer. He eventually realizes that it is Peggy and her boyfriend, Paul Kimmel, who are behind the killings, Peggy gaining revenge for her former husband's business schemes.

== Cast ==
- John Ericson as Blake Heller
- Lola Albright as Peggy Lido
- Leslie Parrish as Treva Saint
- Nehemiah Persoff as Lt. Dow Reeves
- Charles Drake as Harvey Sheppard
- Kent Smith as Paul Kimmel
- Don Rickles as Harry Darkwater
- Michael Forest as Haines Conjar
- Mark Roberts as Joe Diguseppe
- Edy Williams as Sabra McKinley
- Marilyn Devin as George
- Jim Adams as Sam
- Leslie McRay as Sultry Voice & Legs
- Dale Monroe as Doctor
- Dodie Warren as Nurse
- Dub Taylor as Pete Jensen
- R.L. Armstrong as Ernie James
- John Cliff as Tongs Fowler
- George DeNormand as Jim Houston
- Byrd Holland as Chet Manning
- Richard Norris as Lou Sayre
- Ed Parker as Cassidy

== See also ==
- List of American films of 1968
