= William Thourlby =

American actor (1924–2013)

- Born: William Leo Thourly; January 22 1924; Detroit, Michigan, United States
- Died: April 15 2013 (aged 89); New York, United States
- Occupations: Actor, model, writer

William Leo Thourlby (January 22, 1924 – April 15, 2013) was an American actor, model and writer. He was known for his rugged, cowboy look when he appeared as the face of the Marlboro Man campaign in the 1950s. This ad campaign was one of the 20th century's most famous, redefining the Marlboro brand image from a cigarette for women to one for men.

== Early life and career ==
William Thourlby was born on January 22, 1924, in Detroit, Michigan, the son of William H. Thourlby and Edith Thourlby. He had two siblings, both sisters; Margaret P. Thourlby and Gloria G. Thourlby.

Thourlby started his modeling career by working for the pulp magazine covers. He was offered the Marlboro ad in 1953.

He also began acting, appearing in the films The Manchurian Candidate (1962), The Creeping Terror (1964) as Dr. Bradford, and as Ben Wiley in Angel's Flight (1965). He was also the producer of Angel's Flight. He was given the role of a Native American chief in a sportsmen's show in New York with Jim Thorpe, and the two became friends. In the 1950s, he and Thorpe owned a restaurant in Los Angeles.

Thourlby was cast as Sam Starr, the second husband of the outlaw Belle Starr (Carole Mathews), in the 1961 episode, "A Bullet for the D.A.", on the syndicated television anthology series, Death Valley Days, hosted by Stanley Andrews. In the story line, Belle unsuccessfully plots the revenge assassination of United States Attorney W. H. H. Clayton (Don Haggerty) during a Wild West show in Fort Smith, Arkansas. Others in the episode are Carlyle Mitchell in his penultimate acting role as "Hanging Judge" Isaac C. Parker, under whom Clayton served.

Thourlby also appeared on Broadway, in Will Success Spoil Rock Hunter? with Jayne Mansfield and Walter Matthau.

As a published writer, Thourlby's books included You Are What You Wear (1978), Passport To Power (1992), and Women The New Power Class (2002).

== Personal life ==
Compared to colleagues who were also the faces of Marlboro during that time, Thourlby claimed that he never smoked cigarettes or consumed alcohol. He was friends with the athlete Jim Thorpe when they partnered to open up a restaurant in Los Angeles. Thourlby said of his relationship with Thorpe, “Jim adopted me as his son in an Indian ceremony—I called him Dad and he called me 'my boy.'" Thorpe helped Thourlby land several roles in movies before his Marlboro campaign. Thourlby owned and operated a men's clothing store on Peachtree St. in Atlanta in the 1970s where he personally consulted with each customer on style, fit and tailoring of each suit.

Until his death, Thourlby lived alone in the New York Athletic Club for 40 years and was one of its three remaining permanent tenants. Thourlby was divorced twice and had four children; Jamie Williams, Abby Thourlby, Liza Grace Thourlby and Nana Black. William Thourlby preferred to spend his latter years mostly in solitude. He died on April 15, 2013, in New York, at age 89.

== Filmography ==
Year	Title	Role	Notes
1951	Inside Straight	Immigrant	Uncredited
1951	Government Agents vs. Phantom Legion	Henchman Larson	(Ch. 3), uncredited
1951	Fort Dodge Stampede	Doubtful	Uncredited
1951	Rhubarb	Baseball Player	Uncredited
1951	Fixed Bayonets!	Husky Doggie	Uncredited
1953	The Joe Louis Story	Max Schmeling	Uncredited
1960	Alfred Hitchcock Presents	Lefty James	Season 6 Episode 4: "The Contest for Aaron Gold"
1962	The Manchurian Candidate	Little	Uncredited
1964	Vengeance	Captain Lafe Todd	
1964	The Creeping Terror	Dr. Bradford	
1965	Angel's Flight	Ben Wiley	
1966	Destination Inner Space	Tex	
1966	Castle of Evil	Kovic	
1969	The Best Damn Fiddler from Calabogie to Kaladar	Adam	
2002	Two Weeks Notice	Man in Elevator	Final film role
