= James Mastin =

American artist (1935–2016)

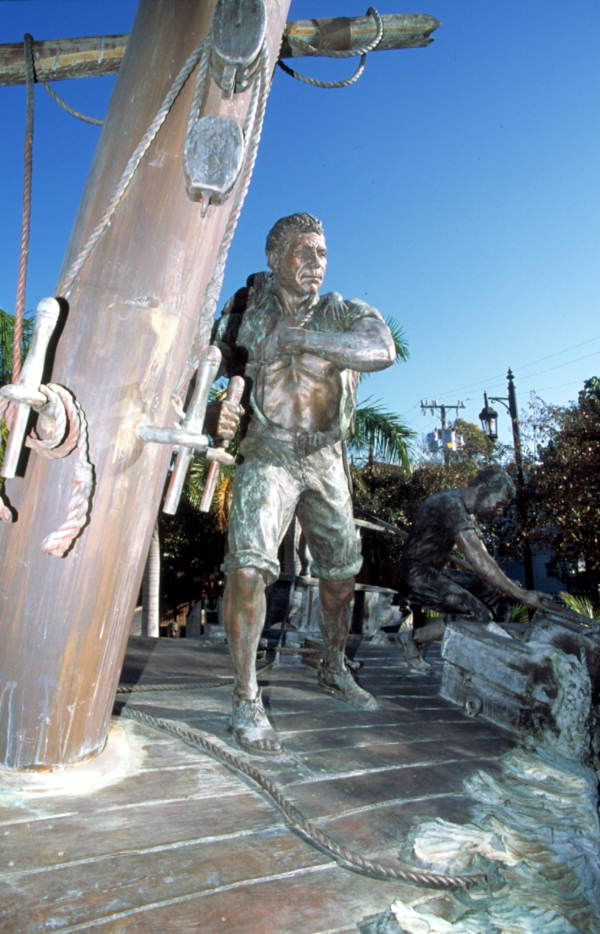
- "The Wreckers" in Key West, Florida
- Born: 1935; Sioux Falls, South Dakota
- Died: 2016 (aged 80–81); Miami, Florida
- Known for: Sculpture

James Richard Mastin (1935–2016) was an American sculptor and painter, best known for his public monuments of life-sized bronze figures commemorating significant historical events and individuals. The hallmark of his work was meticulous craftsmanship and emotional content.

His most recognized public works are the Bahamian National Monument, "Loyalist Memorial Sculpture Garden" in Green Turtle Cay, The Bahamas, the "Key West Historical Memorial Sculpture Garden" in Key West, Florida, and "Les Chasseurs Volontaires" (commemorating the Chasseurs-Volontaires de Saint-Domingue in the Siege of Savannah) in Savannah, Georgia.

== Early life and education ==
James Mastin was born in South Dakota, but grew up in Los Angeles, California. He was a classically trained artist, with degrees from Pasadena City College, the Art Center of Los Angeles, the Los Angeles County Art Institute, the Chouinard Art Institute, and studied under Sergei Bongart, as well as the Massachusetts Conservatory of Art and Music.

== Career ==
Mastin originally pursued an acting career and sold artwork to support his studies. He appeared in the 1965 film Angel's Flight. After military service, he opened a commercial art studio in California. A large number of his paintings were put into print by Windsor Art. In the 1960s Mastin traveled the American Southwest, painting portraits of Native Americans. He began sculpting in the 1970s, primarily working in clay and wax, as well as plaster and resins. He moved to Miami, Florida in the 1970s and opened his permanent art studio, James Mastin Galleries. He remained in Miami until his death.

Over the course of his career, Mastin created many allegorical, figurative, and abstract works exploring the human condition, and explored a variety of media and styles. Although his monumental, public works were heroic figurative pieces full of emotion, his personal work included oil, acrylic, and watercolor landscapes, abstracts, and portraits. He also experimented with mixed media, incorporating lights and sound generated by video images, LED light arrays, mirrors, and water elements. For his monumental work, Mastin sculpted in clay, casting his pieces in bronze using the ancient lost wax method of casting, finishing them with a chemical patina to add color and protect the pieces from the elements.

== Loyalist Memorial Sculpture Garden ==
The Loyalist Memorial Sculpture Garden was declared a national monument of The Bahamas. It consists of a central monument depicting two Loyalist women arriving in The Bahamas surrounded by 24 busts of descendants of Loyalist families. The Loyalists were those individuals who remained loyal to the British Crown after the American war of independence in 1776. Many Loyalists in the northern American colonies fled to Canada, while Loyalists in the more southern American colonies fled to the islands of the Bahamas with their slaves. The Loyalist Memorial Sculpture Garden was commissioned by the Historical Society of Green Turtle Cay.

== Key West Historical Memorial Sculpture Garden ==
The Key West Historical Memorial Sculpture Garden was commissioned by the Friends of Mallory Square, Key West. Its central monument, "The Wreckers" pays tribute to the brave men engaged in salvage operations that made Key West the richest city on the east coast of the United States south of New York in the nineteenth century.

== Les Chasseurs Volontaires ==
Les Chasseurs Volontaires ("Siege of Savannah") was commissioned by the Haitian American Historical Society and the City of Savannah, and commemorates the free Haitian soldiers who successfully fought in the American Revolution in 1776 alongside the American colonial army in Savannah, Georgia to assist in the American efforts towards independence from Great Britain. The drummer boy depicted in the monument was a young Henri Christophe, who became one of the original leaders of the Haitian government, after Haiti obtained its independence from France.

== Other work ==
Mastin also created a maquette, or model, for a larger than life-sized sculpture he contemplated called "Circle of Love" to celebrate the native American Lucayan people who lived in South Florida and in the Caribbean basin at the time of the arrival of European immigrants from Spain.

== Public works ==
- Les Chasseurs Volontaires (Battle of Savannah), Franklin Square, Savannah, Georgia (2007) – Life sized monument to commemorate the Battle of Savannah during American Revolution. Six life-sized Haitian soldiers engaged in active combat, dressed and equipped in historically accurate 18th century French military garb. Installed in 2007, Savannah, Georgia.
- Toussaint L’Ouverture – Seven foot high full length bronze statue of Father of the Haitian Revolution. Commissioned by City of Miami. Installed 2005, Miami.
- Mayor McCoy – Life-sized bronze portrait bust of Monroe County Mayor. Commissioned by Monroe County, Florida. Installed 2004, Key West, Florida
- California Pioneers – Life sized bronze portrait busts of historical pioneers to Southern California. Commissioned by Historic Tours of San Diego, California. Installed in Old Town Market, San Diego, 2003.
- Toussaint L'Ouverture, Henri Christophe, Madame Kolo, Alexandre Petion – each 9 foot high bronze monuments honoring historical heroes of the Haitian war of independence in the 18 the century. Commissioned by the Musee du Pantheon Nationale Haitien. Installed 1998, 1999 and 2003 Port-au-Prince, Haiti.
- Key West Historical Sculpture Garden, Mallory Square, Key West, Florida – Public sculpture park consisting of central life-sized bronze monument "The Wreckers" and 39 bronze portrait busts of dignitaries selected by the city of Key West. Commissioned by Friends of Mallory Square, Inc. Originally installed 1997. The dignitaries include President Harry Truman, Ernest Hemingway, and Henry Flagler. In 2018, Mastin's bust of Tennessee Williams was installed. The central monument depicts two brave wreckers rescuing a child and salvaging cargo from a foundering vessel off the shores of Key West.
- Hanukiah – Illuminated outdoor Hanukah Menorah of copper, 12 feet high. Commissioned by Beth David Congregation, Miami, Florida. Installed in 1994.
- Ship Fountain – Kinetic fountain of copper, brass and stainless steel; thirty feet high. Designed in collaboration with architect Hink Jan Slingerland. Commissioned by Pelican Key Resort, St. Maarten. Installed 1989.
- St. Francis Xavier – Full figure in bronze. Commissioned by The cathedral, Nassau Bahamas. Installed 1988.
- Loyalist Memorial Sculpture Garden – Public sculpture park in classical style featuring 14 foot high central monument of cast bronze, native plants and flowing water, titled “The Landing”, depicting 2 American Loyalist women landing in Bahamas in 1783, surrounded by 30 bronze busts of contemporary descendants of Loyalist families, including the wife of the former Prime Minister, and other Bahamian officials, mounted on native stone bases in landscaped park. Commissioned by New Plymouth Historical Society, Abaco, The Bahamas. Declared a National Monument by Bahamian Government. Installed 1987.

== Cultural activities ==
James Mastin was also an accomplished singer, pianist, and actor, and performed concerts in The Bahamas and Florida. He collaborated with Alton Roland Lowe to establish the Albert Lowe Museum in Green Turtle Cay, The Bahamas. He was also a resident at Bakehouse Art Complex and a member of 2+3 The Artists Collaborative and the Civic Chorale of Miami.
