= Warren J. Kemmerling =

American film, stage and television actor

Warren J. Kemperling
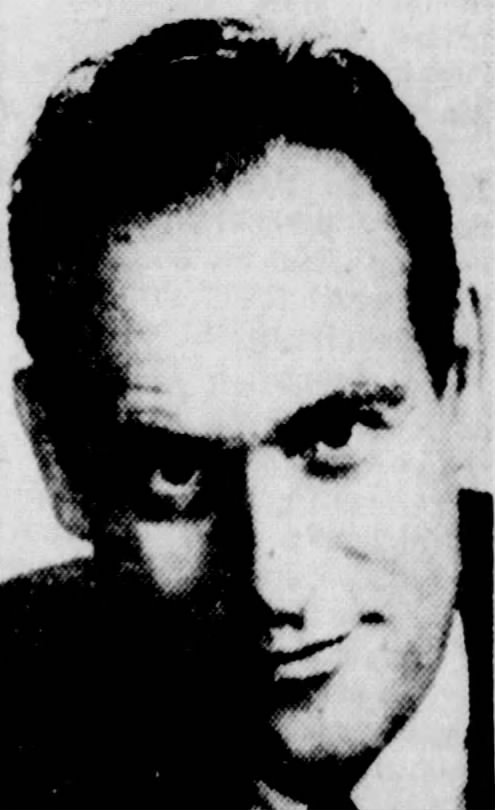
- Kemmerling in 1957
- Born: Warren Joseph Kemmerling; January 4, 1924; St. Louis, Missouri, U.S.
- Died: January 3, 2005 (aged 80); Los Angeles, California, U.S.
- Education: Saint Louis University
- Occupations: Film, stage and television actor

Warren Joseph Kemmerling (January 4, 1924 – January 3, 2005) was an American film, stage and television actor. He was best known for playing Major "Wild Bill" Walsh in the 1977 film Close Encounters of the Third Kind.

== Life and career ==
Kemmerling was born in St. Louis, Missouri. He attended Saint Louis University. He began his stage career in 1953, appearing in the stage play Me and Juliet. During his stage career, he appeared in numerous stage plays such as Anniversary Waltz, Orpheus Descending, Ankles Aweigh and Pipe Dream. He began his stage career in 1959, appearing in the CBS crime drama television series Brenner. In 1960, he appeared in the television programs Deadline, Bourbon Street Beat, Black Saddle, M Squad, Johnny Midnight, Shotgun Slade, The Blue Angels, Two Faces West and One Step Beyond.

Later in his career, Kemmerling guest-starred in numerous television programs including Gunsmoke, Bonanza, Tales of Wells Fargo, The Twilight Zone, Death Valley Days, The Fugitive, The Green Hornet, Lawman, Peter Gunn, The Jack Benny Program and The Virginian, and played Dr. Joe Hendricks in the NBC soap opera television series Days of Our Lives. In 1977, he played Major "Wild Bill" Walsh in the film Close Encounters of the Third Kind. He appeared in films such as The Cheyenne Social Club, Angel's Flight, 92 in the Shade, The Bermuda Triangle, Incident in an Alley and Hit!.

Kemmerling retired from acting in 1990, last appearing in the ABC legal drama television series Equal Justice.

== Death ==
Kemmerling died on January 3, 2005, at his home in Los Angeles, California, at the age of 80.
