= Terry O. Morse =

American film director and editor

- The only known photograph of Terry O. Morse
- Born: January 30, 1906; St. Louis, Missouri, United States
- Died: May 19, 1984 (aged 78); Newhall, California, United States
- Occupation(s): Film director, editor

Terry O. Morse (January 30, 1906 – May 19, 1984) was an American film director and editor. He is perhaps best known for directing the American scenes in Godzilla, King of the Monsters!, the 1956 "Americanized" version of the 1954 Japanese Godzilla film from Toho. The film went on to long-lasting success with regular showings at drive-in theatres, repertory theatres and on television. Its popularity completely obscured the original film which remained virtually unknown in the United States for several decades after its release.

== Biography ==
Born in St. Louis, Missouri, Morse began his career as a film editor in 1927, and early in his career was credited as Terrell Morse, and later Terry Morse. Although he continued working as an editor throughout his career, he also directed films, starting with The Adventures of Jane Arden in 1939.

Most of his career was spent at Warner Bros., and was usually within the crime melodrama genre, although he also directed some comedies. He was unhappy with the movies he was given to direct and went independent.

By this time, Morse had gained a solid reputation as a "film doctor," whose sharp editing skills helped to improve some movies. He was therefore asked to edit and direct new scenes in Godzilla, King of the Monsters!, spliced into the original film. At the time, the re-editing was so effective that American audiences were convinced that Raymond Burr had actually gone to Japan to shoot the picture. It became the most famous film he was involved with.

His son, Terry Morse Jr. followed him into filmmaking, and is a film producer and director.

Morse died in Newhall, California.

== Selected filmography ==
=== Editor ===
- The Whip Woman (1928)
- The Girl from Woolworth's (1929)
- Misbehaving Ladies (1931)
- Two Seconds (1932)
- Talent Scout (1937)
- Rogue River (1951)
- The Moonlighter (1953)
- The List of Adrian Messenger (1963)
- Panic in the City (1968)
- The Girl Who Knew Too Much (1969)

=== Director ===
- Waterfront (1939)
- Smashing the Money Ring (1939)
- British Intelligence (1940)
- Fog Island (1945)
- Don Ricardo Returns (1946)
- Unknown World (1951)
- Godzilla, King of the Monsters (1956)
- Taffy and the Jungle Hunter (1965)
- Young Dillinger (1965)
