= Indus Arthur =

American actress

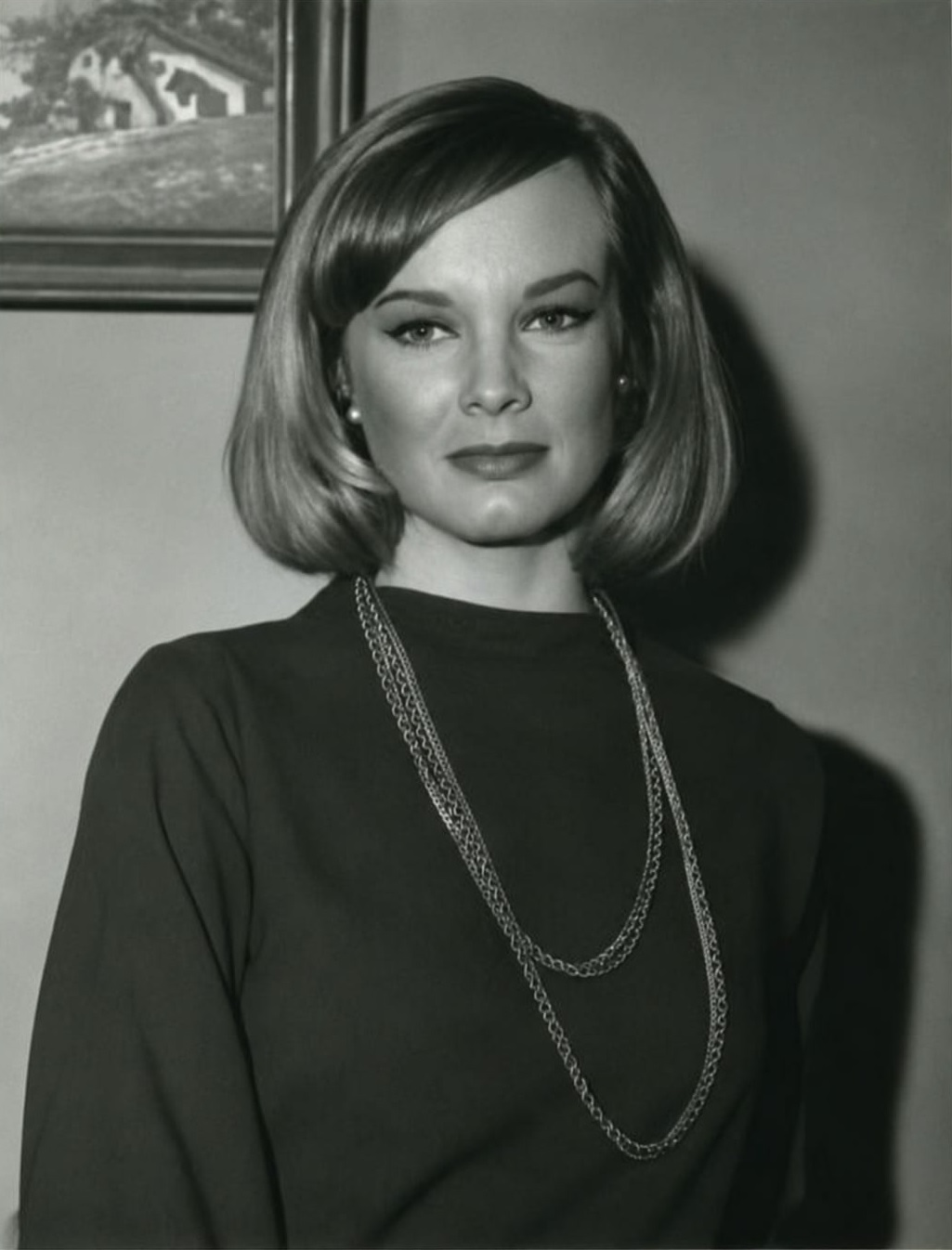
- Arthur in The Alfred Hitchcock Hour (1965)
- Born: Indus Jo Saugstad; April 28, 1941; Los Angeles County, California, U.S.
- Died: December 29, 1984 (aged 43); Los Angeles County, California, U.S.
- Occupation: Actress
- Years active: 1963–1984

Indus Arthur (born Indus Jo Saugstad; April 28, 1941 – December 29, 1984) was an American film and television actress.

== Early life ==
Arthur was born in Los Angeles County. Both she and her grandmother were named for the Indus River in Tibet. Her grandmother once visited the river, and Arthur wished to do so. Her father, Mac Julian, was a still cameraman for Hollywood studios. He opposed the fact that Arthur and her two sisters were becoming involved in films. Arthur attended Hollywood High School and Trinity College in Dublin, Ireland. She also acted with the Dublin Players.

== Career ==
=== Stage ===
Arthur signed as the leading lady for the mystery play Uncle Marston in April 1963. The production was staged at the Stage Society Theater in Los Angeles. A reviewer referred to her acting prowess in the role of an agitated heiress, commenting "Arthur is a lovely, polished performer." Previously she had appeared in theater in London, England and at the Dublin Playhouse in Dublin, Ireland.

=== Film ===
Arthur appeared in Sydney Pollack's directing debut The Slender Thread (1965) as an employee of a crisis clinic which counsels potential suicide victims. She was assigned a role in Alvarez Kelly (1966), a western that was set during the era of the American Civil War. It featured a Mexican cattleman played by William Holden and a military colonel depicted by Richard Widmark. Arthur's other film roles were in Angel's Flight (1965), M*A*S*H (1970), and The Christian Licorice Store (1971).

=== Television ===
Arthur was a prolific actress on television. Among her many appearances are episodes of the Kraft Suspense Theater (1964–1965), The Alfred Hitchcock Hour (1965), Ben Casey (1965), T.H.E. Cat (1966), The Virginian (1966), The Wild Wild West (1966), Dragnet (1967), and General Hospital (1963, 1970–1973). She made two guest appearances on Perry Mason in 1965 as Nancy Bryant in "The Case of the Telltale Tap", and in 1966, as Barbara Kramer in "The Case of the Dead Ringer".

=== Original Renaissance Faire ===
Indus Arthur played the harp and sang at the Original Renaissance Faire in Agoura, California.

== Death ==
Indus Arthur died in Los Angeles County in 1984 of complications from a brain tumor at age 43.

== Filmography ==
Year	Title	Role	Notes
1965	The Alfred Hitchcock Hour	Sandy Evans	season 3, episode 29: "Off Season"
1965	The Slender Thread	Marian	
1965	Angel's Flight	Liz	
1966	Alvarez Kelly	Melinda	
1966	Wild Wild West	Miss Jennifer McCoy	
1967	Dragnet (1967 TV series)	Pat Olney	"The Badge Racket"
1970	M* A* S* H	Lt. Leslie	
1971	The Christian Licorice Store	Last Party Guest #10	
