= John Napier (actor) =

American film, stage and television actor

- Napier in 1960
- Born: John Wesley Napier; December 2, 1926; Roda, Virginia, U.S.
- Died: November 17, 2008 (aged 81); Colorado, U.S.
- Education: Virginia Southern College
- Occupations: Film, stage and television actor

John Wesley Napier (December 2, 1926 – November 17, 2008) was an American film, stage and television actor. He was best known for playing the recurring role of Reverend Ken Cleveland in the final season of American medical drama television series Dr. Kildare.

== Life and career ==
Napier was born in Roda, Virginia, and was raised in Harlan County, Kentucky. His father was a miner. He served in the United States Army during World War II. After his discharge, he attended and graduated from Virginia Southern College, which after graduating, he worked as a salesman, and attended Cincinnati Conservatory of Music, studying drama. He worked as a police officer, and appeared on stage. He began his screen career in 1956, appearing in the NBC anthology television series Armstrong Circle Theatre. In the same year, he appeared in the ABC anthology television series The United States Steel Hour.

Later in his career, Napier guest-starred in television programs including Bonanza, The Farmer's Daughter, Gomer Pyle – USMC, Perry Mason, The Time Tunnel, Land of the Giants and Bracken's World, and played the recurring role of Reverend Ken Cleveland in the final season in the NBC medical drama television series Dr. Kildare. He played the role of Jerry Barnes in the NBC soap opera television series Days of Our Lives, and the role of Cliff Williams in the CBS soap opera television series Search for Tomorrow. He also appeared in films such as Father Goose, The Great Sioux Massacre, The Slender Thread and Rough Night in Jericho.

Napier retired from acting in 1969, last appearing in the film The Girl Who Knew Too Much. After retiring from acting, he worked as a corporate financial executive.

== Death ==
Napier died on November 17, 2008, in Colorado, at the age of 81.
