= The Girl Who Knew Too Much (1969 film) =

1969 film by Francis D. Lyon

- Theatrical release poster
- Directed by: Francis Lyon
- Written by: Charles Allen Wallace
- Produced by: Earle Lyon
- Starring: Adam West; Nancy Kwan; Nehemiah Persoff; Robert Alda; Buddy Greco
- Edited by: Terry O. Morse
- Music by: Joe Greene
- Production company: United Pictures Corporation
- Distributed by: Commonwealth United Entertainment Inc
- Release date: November 1969
- Running time: 96 min.
- Country: United States
- Language: English

The Girl Who Knew Too Much is a 1969 American neo noir film starring Adam West as Johnny Cain, a nightclub owner and former freelance adventurer who is forced out of retirement when a crime syndicate boss is murdered in his nightclub and investigations lead into unexpected areas. It was the final film of director Francis D. Lyon and United Pictures Corporation.

The film co-stars Nancy Kwan, Nehemiah Persoff, Robert Alda, Patricia Smith, David Brian, and noted jazz musician Buddy Greco as nightclub entertainer Albert "Lucky" Jones. The melodramatic promotional tagline of The Girl Who Knew Too Much was: "You have to be crazy or in love — to take on the syndicate!"

The film was intended to be a vehicle for Adam West to escape his Batman stereotype by playing a cynical, hard-edged tough guy. The movie's dialogue is typified by a scene between West's Cain and the boozy Mrs. Grinaldi played by Smith:

Mrs. Grinaldi: "And what do you do for a living, Mr. Cain?"
Cain: "I kill people, Mrs. Grinaldi."

The Girl Who Knew Too Much was not a box office success in theatrical release, but became a staple of late-night showings on WCBS-TV and other television stations in the early 1970s. It then disappeared for decades and was in danger of becoming a lost film. However, it finally appeared in a home video release that came on May 28, 2013, on Blu-ray and DVD.

== Cast ==
- Adam West as Johnny Cain
- Nancy Kwan as Revel Drue
- Nehemiah Persoff as Lieutenant Miles Crawford
- Buddy Greco as Lucky Jones
- Robert Alda as Kenneth Allardice
- David Brian as Had Dixon
- Patricia Smith as Tricia Grinaldi
- Weaver Levy as Wong See
- John Napier as Danny Deshea
- Lisa Todd as Sugar Sweet

== See also ==
- List of American films of 1969
