= Frozen Alive (film) =

1964 British-German film by Bernard Knowles

- US film poster
- Directed by: Bernard Knowles
- Screenplay by: Evelyn Frazer
- Produced by: Artur Brauner; Ronald Rietti; Irving Dennis (co-producer)
- Starring: Mark Stevens; Marianne Koch; Wolfgang Lukschy
- Cinematography: Robert Ziller
- Edited by: Steven Collins
- Release dates: 30 December 1964 (UK); 15 June 1966 (United States)
- Running time: 80 minutes
- Countries: West Germany; UK

Frozen Alive (also known as Der Fall X 701) is a 1964 British-German international co-production science-fiction film directed by Bernard Knowles and produced by Artur Brauner and Ronald Rieti. It stars Mark Stevens, Marianne Koch, and Wolfgang Lukschy. The film was released in the US in 1966 on a double bill with Destination Inner Space.The plot concerns scientists Dr. Frank Overton and Dr. Helen Wieland, who are experimenting in Berlin with "deep-freezing" chimpanzees (the word cryogenics is only used once in the film) and thawing them unhurt. Overton decides to use himself as a human test subject, but he is wrongly accused of murdering his philandering wife, and the police believe that he is attempting to avoid arrest.

== Plot ==
Two scientists from the World Health Organisation's Low Temperature Unit in Berlin – the American Dr. Frank Overton and Dr. Helen Wieland, a West German, have successfully frozen chimpanzees, stored them at -80 °C for three months, and thawed them with no ill effects. Their goal is to move on to humans and save those suffering from currently incurable diseases.

Frank and Helen are affectionate, but Frank is married to Joan, an alcoholic fashion journalist, who is jealous of the two, although nothing is going on between them. Her lover, Tony Stein, is a newspaper crime reporter.

The director of the Low Temperature Unit, Sir Keith, has forbidden Frank and Helen from human experimentation. They have won a prestigious award for their work with chimps, and are each to receive $25,000. Frank suggests to Joan that they buy a cottage in the country, after which she would quit her job and have babies; she has previously said she wanted children but it becomes clear that she only said it because it was what her husband wanted. Now, Joan is not enthusiastic. She is jealous of Helen as she thinks Frank spends too much time with her. Frank and Joan argue, and Frank storms off to work on an all-night experiment with Helen. Joan, in turns, goes out with Tony.

At Tony's apartment, Joan and he also argue after he cut their date short to write an article, which will take all night. When Tony moves to another room to write in peace, a drunken Joan takes his semi-automatic pistol and leaves. She goes to the lab to confront Helen, but Frank physically removes her from the premises. At home, Joan and Frank row, and Joan says she wishes she was dead. Frank thinks that she is being silly, but then sees she has a gun. As they struggle over it, the pistol discharges but neither is struck by the bullet. Frank pulls out the empty clip and believes the gun is unloaded.

After Joan has sobered up a bit, she asks Frank if he can arrange a short, romantic holiday for them. Frank says yes, but it will mean he must work that night, helping Helen finish a project. At the lab, he tells Helen that despite Sir Keith's order, they must take the next step and deep-freeze a human - him. Lab technician Martin asks Helen how he should enter the experiment in the lab's logbook. Helen says that since the previous experiment was numbered X700, freezing Frank is X701.

Tony goes to Joan to retrieve his pistol. To his surprise, Joan refuses a drink, saying that she is on the wagon. Then she declares that it is time to say "auf wiedersehen" to the old, drunken Joan, melodramatically puts the gun to her abdomen, and shoots herself, not realizing the supposedly empty gun had a live round in the chamber. Tony puts her to bed, where she dies. He leaves her body lying there and leaves, taking the pistol with him. A cleaning woman finds Joan the next morning.

Police Inspector Prentow and Sgt. Grun arrive at the lab to interrogate Frank, the chief subject in what they assume is Joan's murder. Upon learning that he has been frozen, Prentow demands that Frank be thawed immediately.

Meanwhile, Tony sees a headline in a newspaper that reads "Bekannte Mode-Journalisten tot aufgefunden! Ehemann verschwindet!" ("Famous fashion journalist found dead! Husband disappears!") and call his uncle, the Vice President of Police, to explain what actually happened. The message about Joan's accidental death is passed on to Prentow. Frank thaws, alive and well.

A year later, Frank and his friendly boss Prof. Hubbard relax outdoors as Hubbard reads aloud an interview with Sir Keith, who takes full credit for successfully freezing and thawing Frank. Helen walks around the corner of the country cottage, and she and Frank, arm in arm, stroll off together.

== Cast ==
- Mark Stevens as Dr. Frank Overton
- Marianne Koch as Dr. Helen Wieland
- Wolfgang Lukschy as Police Inspector Prentow
- Joachim Hansen as Tony Stein
- Delphi Lawrence as Joan Overton
- Walter Rilla as Sir Keith (in credits as Walter Rilia)
- Helmut Weiss as Chairman
- John Longden as Prof. Hubbard
- Albert Bessler as Martin (in credits as Albert Ressler)
- Sigurd Lohde as Dr. Karl Merkeimer
- Wolfgang Gunther as Police Sgt. Grun

== Production ==
Frozen Alive was made by the production companies Alfa-Film and Creole Filmproduktion GmbH in the Federal Republic of Germany.

The German title Der Fall X701 translates roughly into English as "Casefile no. 701."

== Release ==
Frozen Alive was released to theatres in West Germany in 1964, the year it was made.

The film has its US theatrical release two years later, in January 1966, with its premiere on 15 June 1966 in San Francisco. The film's running time was 80 minutes. Academic film scholar Kevin Heffernan writes that the movie was made available for television showings in the US in January 1966 - the same month as its theatrical release - by Television Enterprises Corporation as one of 28 films in its "Regency Feature Film Group."

In the UK, the BBFC approved version of Frozen Alive, cut to a running time of 64 minutes 7 seconds, was granted an A-certificate by the BBFC on 1 December 1967, which is also listed as its release date. The A-cert meant that children under age 14 could view the film in theatre only if accompanied by an adult; those 14 and over could attend unaccompanied.

== Distribution ==
As an international co-production, Frozen Alive had multiple theatrical distributors: Nora-Filmverleih in West German; Feature Film Corporation of America and Magna Corporation in the US; and Butcher's Film Service in the UK.

The American exhibitors' manual for the film promotes it as a "thriller packed with romance" and a "powerful drama" which "probes the question of whether humans can be placed in deep-freeze for a considerable length of time, and then be brought back to life." Posters and lobby cards for Frozen Alive prominently feature the blurb, "Timely As Today's Headlines!" Contemporary German film posters call director Knowles a "Hitchcock-Experte."

Frozen Alive has been distributed in the US for home viewing on DVD on numerous occasions as a stand-alone single film, half of a double feature, and in collections of up to 250 movies. Companies that have released the film include Alpha Video, Digital 1 Stop, Digiview Entertainment, Genius Entertainment, Mill Creek Entertainment, Retromedia, St. Clair Entertainment, and VFN.

The movie was shown on the then-independent WPIX-TV Channel 11 in New York City on 24 July 1976 at 8.00 pm Eastern Time. It was described as "ice cold" by The New York Times.

== Reception ==
The Monthly Film Bulletin wrote: "A soporific thriller which achieves some semblance of animation only in the climax in the laboratory. Acting and direction are as stodgy as the script."

Film historian Bryan Senn mentions the movie only on a list of "notable mismatched double features," in this case "The juvenile but colorful monster flick Destination Inner Space" and the "sober (but dull) science melodrama Frozen Alive.

Sandra Brennan of Allmovie refers to the film as a "sci-fi murder mystery."

British critic Clive Davies points out that "Everyone seems to have forgotten about the dead wife in the 'happy' ending." He calls the film a "watchable but essentially forgettable time-waster" and notes that while Frozen Alive was filmed in Germany, its dialog was done in English, which required the subtitling of a close-up of a newspaper headline written in German.

Sci-Fi Encyclopedia highlights the "dead wife," noting that "this film revolves primarily around the apparent mystery of Joan's death." The review also says that the movie is "partially crippled by its conspicuously low budget," but that nonetheless "everyone involved turns in a decent performance."

Biochemist and science-fiction fan Mark C. Glassy finds the depiction of high-quality science in the movie. "The level of accuracy in the science throughout this film was refreshingly high, and I have nothing but praise for Elizabeth Frazer, the writer of the film. She did a marvelous job and certainly did her homework," he writes.
