= Lisa Gaye =

American actress (1935–2016)

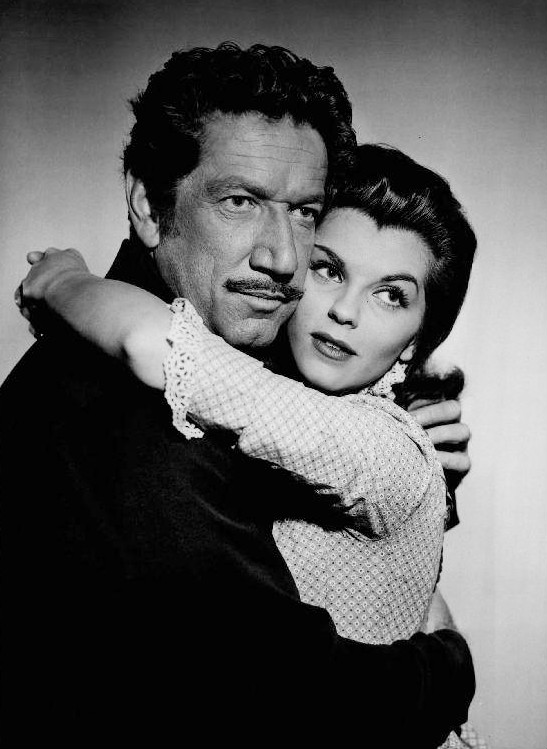
- Lisa Gaye with Richard Boone as a guest star on CBS's Have Gun – Will Travel
- Born: Leslie Gaye Griffin; March 6, 1935; Denver, Colorado, U.S.
- Died: July 14, 2016 (aged 81); Houston, Texas, U.S.
- Education: Hollywood Professional School
- Occupations: Actress; dancer
- Years active: 1954–1970
- Known for: Drums Across the River; Ten Thousand Bedrooms; How to Marry a Millionaire
- Spouse: Bently C. Ware (m. 1955; died 1977)
- Children: 1
- Relatives: Debra Paget (sister); Teala Loring (sister)

Leslie Gaye Griffin (March 6, 1935 – July 14, 2016), better known as Lisa Gaye, was an American actress and dancer.

== Early years ==
Leslie Gaye Griffin was born on March 6, 1935, in Denver, Colorado, to Frank Henry Griffin, a painter, and Margaret Allen Griffin (née Gibson), an actress.

Her family moved from Denver to Los Angeles, California, when sister Teala was contracted to be an actress by Paramount Pictures. Her mother was determined that Gaye and her siblings make their careers in show business. Her siblings, Marcia (Teala Loring), Debralee (Debra Paget), and Frank (Ruell Shayne), all entered the business as either cast or crew.

She attended Hollywood's Professional School.

== Career ==
Gaye made her first professional film appearance at the age of 7. At 17, she signed a seven-year contract with Universal Studios and was enrolled in the studio's professional school for actors and actresses.

She began her acting career with two uncredited cameos in 1953–54. Her first starring role was in Drums Across the River (1954). She appeared in 13 films between 1954 and 1967, including Ten Thousand Bedrooms (1957), and television shows such as Hawaiian Eye (1959) and How to Marry a Millionaire (1957).

On stage, Gaye acted in a production of Merry Wives of Windsor when she was 12 years old. In 1957, she made her adult stage debut in Darling, I'm Yours in San Francisco.

== Television ==
Among Gaye's television appearances were three episodes of The George Burns and Gracie Allen Show in 1956, 13 episodes of The Bob Cummings Show as Colette Dubois, five episodes each of the ABC/Warner Brothers detective series, Hawaiian Eye and 77 Sunset Strip, two episodes of another ABC-WB series, Bourbon Street Beat, seven episodes of CBS's Perry Mason, and eleven episodes of the syndicated anthology series Death Valley Days, along with several episodes of Sea Hunt and an episode of Colt .45. She appeared as Susan Marno in Wanted: Dead or Alive with Steve McQueen.

She appears in one episode of Zorro in the 1957 episode "Constance". She appeared twice in Have Gun - Will Travel in 1957 as Helen in "Helen of Abajinian", and as Nancy in "Gun Shy" (along with Dan Blocker, Corey Allen and Jeanette Nolan), and in the Science Fiction Theatre episode "Gravity Zero" as Elisabeth. She made a single appearance in "The Peace Offering", a 1959 episode of the syndicated western series Pony Express, starring Grant Sullivan. Among her seven appearances on Perry Mason, Gaye played Rita Magovern and Lola Bronson in the 1961 episodes "The Case of the Traveling Treasure" and "The Case of the Guilty Clients". In 1964 she played as Pamela Blair in "The Case of the Nautical Knot". Also in 1961, Gaye appeared as a Spanish woman tied up in a revolution against the United States in an episode of Maverick titled "State of Siege". She appeared in several episodes of Bat Masterson: in "Sharpshooter", she played Laurie LaRue, the stage assistant and wife of stage sharpshooter Danny Dowling; in the 1959 episode "Buffalo Kill" as Susan; and in the 1961 episode "The Fatal Garment", she portrayed Elena, a Mexican cantina owner. In 1961, she also appeared in an episode of Tales of Wells Fargo entitled “The Dowery”. She also appeared in a 1962 episode of Laramie as an Indian woman, Winona.

== Personal life and death ==
Gaye married Bently C. Ware, operator of a secretarial agency, in 1955; the marriage ended with his death in 1977; the couple had one daughter, Janelle. Gaye died in Houston, Texas, on July 14, 2016. Because her husband had served as a corporal in the U.S. Army, she was interred at Houston National Cemetery.

== Selected filmography ==
- The Glenn Miller Story (1954) - Bobbysoxer (uncredited)
- Yankee Pasha (1954) - Harem Girl (uncredited)
- Drums Across the River (1954) - Jennie
- Magnificent Obsession (1954) - Switchboard Girl (uncredited)
- Ain't Misbehavin' (1955) - Chorine (uncredited)
- Rock Around the Clock (1956) - Lisa Johns
- Shake, Rattle & Rock! (1956) - June Fitzdingle
- Ten Thousand Bedrooms (1957) - Ana Martelli
- Sweethearts (1957)
- Night of Evil (1962) - Dixie Ann Dikes
- La cara del terror (1962) - Norma Borden
- Castle of Evil (1966) - Carrol Harris
- The Violent Ones (1967) - Dolores

=== Other television credits ===
- The Bob Cummings Show (1955–1959) - Collette DuBois (recurring role)
- Annie Oakley (1956) - Vera Barker
- The George Burns and Gracie Allen Show (1956) - Carol Rogers / Felicia Norris / Mary Brewster
- The Adventures of Jim Bowie (1956, 1957) - Maria Miro / Jeanne Brasseaur
- Science Fiction Theatre (1957) - Episode "Gravity Zero"
- Have Gun – Will Travel (1957, 1958) - Nancy Warren / Helen Abajinian
- The Walter Winchell File (1958) - Doris Carter
- Tombstone Territory (1958, 1959) - Nancy Cooley / Miss Lizette
- How to Marry a Millionaire (1958–1959) - Gwen Kirby (main cast, season 2)
- Perry Mason (1958–1966) - Laraine Keely / Pamela Blair / Joyce Hadley / Alyssa Laban / Rita Magovern / Lola Bronson / Juror
- Sea Hunt (1959) - Ann Barry / June Leeds / Philana / Louise Wiley / Blaze Green
- Bat Masterson (1959, 1961) - Lori Dowling / Susan Carver / Elena
- Men into Space (1960) - Joyce Lynn
- Wanted: Dead or Alive (1960) season 3 episode 3 (“Journey for Josh”) - Susan Marno
- Cheyenne (1960) - Francie Scott / Jenny Beaumont
- Rawhide (1960) - Odette Laurier
- Death Valley Days (1960–1969) - Lisa Tracy / Lottie Deno / Mystic Maude / Rosie Winters / Gypsy / Faith Turner / Lena / Tacilia - Healing Woman / Delores / Raquel / Yvonne Benet
- 77 Sunset Strip, The Desert Spa Caper (1961) - Janet Hubbell
- Maverick (1961) - Soledad Lozaro
- Wagon Train (1961) - Alma Mendez
- Tales of Wells Fargo (1961) - Sunset / Michelle Bovarde
- Laramie (1962) - Winona
- Going My Way (1962) - Rosa Pavone
- The Wild Wild West (1966, 1967) - Lana Benson / Lorelei
- The Time Tunnel (1967) - Ahza
- Get Smart (1967) - Miss Smith
- I Dream of Jeannie (1968) - Daisy Lou
- The Flying Nun (1969) - Rosita / Elena
- The Mod Squad (1970) - Yolanda (final appearance)
