= Dimension 5 (film) =

1966 film by Franklin Adreon

- Theatrical poster.
- Directed by: Franklin Adreon
- Written by: Arthur C. Pierce
- Produced by: Fred Jordan; Earle Lyon
- Starring: Jeffrey Hunter; France Nuyen; Donald Woods; Harold Sakata
- Cinematography: Alan Stensvold
- Edited by: Robert S. Eisen; John Shouse
- Music by: Paul Dunlap
- Production companies: Harold Goldman Associates; United Pictures Corporation.
- Distributed by: Feature Film Corp. of America
- Release date: October 1966
- Running time: 90 minutes
- Country: United States
- Language: English

Dimension 5 (also known as Dimension Five or Dimension Four) is a 1966 science fiction/espionage film written by Arthur C. Pierce and directed by Franklin Adreon. Jeffrey Hunter and France Nuyen star as time-traveling secret agents. It is part of a series of nine low-budget films produced by United Pictures Corporation.

The films were intended for TV distribution, but received a theatrical release. The time-travel premise had previously been used in the studio's film Cyborg 2087.

== Plot ==
Justin Power, an agent for Espionage, Inc., returns from a mission in which he used a time-travel belt to steal secret plans. He is told by his superior, Cane, that he is to be teamed with a Chinese agent to combat an Asian crime ring, Dragon, headed by crime lord Big Buddha. A sister agency has discovered Dragon plans to destroy Los Angeles if United States forces are not withdrawn from Southeast Asia.

Aware that Dragon has a primitive hydrogen bomb, but no way to deliver it, Espionage, Inc plans to interrogate a captured agent, Chang. Chang is being brought from Hong Kong by two agents—Sato and George—so they might learn Dragon plans. Chang insists that Dragon will see to it that he will never talk. An assassination attempt occurs immediately. Though George is killed, Chang survives when a female agent (unknown to the Espionage agents) shoots the assassin with a dart.

Informed of the incident, Power goes to Ontario Airport where he uses his time-travel device to "preview" the assassination. A man in a cowboy suit shoots Chang with a dart gun concealed in a camera, while Sato and the female agent watch helplessly. The shooter then escapes in a limousine with Big Buddha in the back seat. Powers then switches to the present, warns Sato by radio of the threat, and orders the limousine be prevented from following their taxi. Then he punches out the would-be killer, and the transfer is made successfully.

At headquarters, the Professor, and his assistant, Miss Sweet, subject Chang to a truth machine that forces him to tell what he knows at the risk of brain damage. During the process, Chang switches to Chinese and Sato has to translate. The interrogation of Chang reveals that a hydrogen bomb is being delivered piece-by-piece and assembled in Los Angeles, to be exploded on Christmas Day, three months away. Power meets his new partner, Ki Ti Tsu (Kitty), the agent who aided during the Hong Kong assassination attempt.

Power takes Kitty to a Cantonese restaurant run by an old friend, Kim Fong. He asks Fong about the black market (Power's cover is an importer) and he offers to help, until Big Buddha is mentioned. Fong's hostess, Nancy Ho—a Dragon agent—recognizes Kitty as a Chinese agent and forces Fong to give Power a bomb disguised as an owl-shaped incense burner. Kitty is suspicious because in China, an owl is symbolic of ill omen, and because she recognizes the hostess as an enemy agent. Power disregards her suspicions, and both happen to be out of the car when the bomb explodes.

Later, Power visits Ho and confronts her, demanding the location of the bomb. Ho is killed by Kitty as the former tries to stab Power. Kitty then turns Power over to Dragon agent Stoneface. This a ruse; she has her own reasons to meet up with Big Buddha, and after she signals headquarters, Power is rescued. Power then demonstrates the time travel belt to Kitty, warning her that she must limit her travels to areas that she knows will still be there in the future or past.

Power receives a message from Cane and learns the Ming company—the maker of the owl bomb and a front for Dragon—has a warehouse in Long Beach, and is expecting a shipment from Hong Kong on the Osaka Maru in three weeks. Power and Kitty time travel ahead the three weeks, unaware that they are being watched. When Stoneface wants to kill them with a disintegrator, Big Buddha has him killed instead.

Inspecting the warehouse in the future, Power and Kitty discover Uranium-238 in with the Christmas decorations, but are discovered by Big Buddha, who has been expecting them for the last three weeks. Limited by the restriction that he can only travel to locations he can see, Power bounces between barrels as Dragon agents hunt him. Kitty confronts Big Buddha, wanting revenge for his war crimes as executioner during the Nanking Massacre, including the death of her parents seven years earlier, but she is captured. Power surrenders to Big Buddha to save her. Big Buddha plans to ship Power to Hong Kong to extract secrets from him.

Unexpectedly, Big Buddha's mute servant girl tries to stab him. Power uses the distraction to turn on Big Buddha's bodyguard, Genghis, and a furious fight develops. The much larger Genghis overpowers Power. Finally, Kitty manages to toss Power a gun, which he uses to shoot Genghis down.

Big Buddha by now has forgotten all about his servant girl, who has been waiting for her chance to stab him again. This time she kills him.

Power and Kitty return to the present to use their knowledge to stop Dragon again without time travel, and let Cane's people do all the work.

== Cast ==
- Jeffrey Hunter as Justin Power
- France Nuyen as Kitty
- Harold Sakata as Big Buddha
- Donald Woods as Cane
- Kam Tong as Kim Fong
- Linda Ho as Nancy Ho
- Robert Ito as Sato
- David Chow as Stoneface
- Jon Lormer as Professor
- Bill Walker as Slim
- Virginia Ann Lee (as Virginia Lee) as mute girl
- Lee Kolima as Genghis
- Deanna Lund as Miss Sweet
- Robert Phillips as George
- John McKee as Grumpy Man

== Release ==
Posters billed Sakata as Harold "Oddjob" Sakata to cash in on his popularity for his role in Goldfinger.

== Review ==
Most reviewers have given fair to poor reviews, centering on the film's low production values and silly plot. Jeffrey Hunter's performance has been criticized for his looking bored. France Nuyen, on the other hand, was praised for her performance as a femme fatale.

== Star Trek ==
Several cast members had appeared or would appear in various episodes of Star Trek. Jeffrey Hunter, Jon Lormer and Robert Phillips appeared in the pilot episode, "The Cage". Lormer also appeared in both "The Return of the Archons", and "For the World is Hollow and I Have Touched the Sky", France Nuyen appeared in "Elaan of Troyius" and Maggie Thrett appeared in "Mudd's Women". Robert Ito starred in "Coming of Age", an episode of Star Trek: The Next Generation.

== Home media ==
The film was released on DVD, September 26, 2017 by Kino Video in a widescreen edition

== See also ==
- List of American films of 1966

== Bibliography ==
- Green, Paul (2014). Jeffrey Hunter, the Film, Television, Radio, and Stage Performances. Jefferson, North Carolina: McFarland & Company. pp. 120–121. ISBN 978-0786478682.
