= Francis D. Lyon =

American movie and television director (1905–1998)

- Born: July 29, 1905; Bowbells, North Dakota
- Died: October 8, 1996 (aged 91); Green Valley, Arizona
- Occupation: Film Director

Francis D. "Pete" Lyon (July 29, 1905 – October 8, 1996) was an American film director, television director, and film editor. He and Robert Parrish were co-recipients of the Academy Award for Best Film Editing for the 1947 film, Body and Soul.

== Biography ==
Lyon was born in Bowbells, North Dakota. He moved to California to attend UCLA. After graduation, he moved to England to begin his career in film. He returned to the US and from the early 1930s to the 1950s, Lyon was exclusively an editor, except for one uncredited acting role in 1932. He worked on 29 films as an assistant editor or editor, including The Men in Her Life (1941), Body and Soul (1947) and The Young and The Brave (1963). He moved on to directing, and co-founded United Pictures Corporation in 1966. He was credited on more than 20 additional films before retiring from the entertainment industry in 1970.

In 1993, Lyon published a memoir entitled Twists of Fate: An Oscar Winner's International Career.

Lyon died on October 8, 1996, in Green Valley, Arizona.

== Selected filmography ==
=== Acting role ===
- Opportunity (1918)
- Hypnotized (1932; uncredited role)

=== Editing work ===
- Editing assistance: 10 films
- Film Editor: 19 films; the first was The Basketball Fix (1951)

=== Director (feature films) ===
- Crazylegs (1953)
- The Bob Mathias Story (1954)
- Cult of the Cobra (1955)
- The Great Locomotive Chase (1956)
- Bailout at 43,000 (1957)
- The Oklahoman (1957)
- Gunsight Ridge (1957)
- South Seas Adventure (1958 - first segment)
- Escort West (1959)
- Tomboy and the Champ (1961)
- The Young and The Brave (1963)
- Destination Inner Space (1966)
- Castle of Evil (1966)
- The Money Jungle (1967)
- The Destructors (1968)
- The Girl Who Knew Too Much (1969)

=== Director (television series) ===
Lyon received director credit on 42 episodes of 17 different US television series in the period from 1952 to 1964, plus being credited as the director of the first year's production (25 episodes) of the Walt Disney production The Adventures of Spin and Marty.

== Book ==
- Lyon, Francis D. "Pete" (1993). Twists of Fate: An Oscar Winner's International Career. Evanston, Ill.: Evanston Pub. ISBN 1879260107.
