= Alvarez Kelly =

1966 film by Edward Dmytryk

- Theatrical release poster
- Directed by: Edward Dmytryk
- Written by: Franklin Coen
- Produced by: Sol C. Siegel
- Starring: William Holden; Richard Widmark
- Cinematography: Joseph MacDonald
- Edited by: Harold F. Kress
- Music by: Johnny Green
- Color process: Pathécolor
- Production company: Sol C. Siegel Productions
- Distributed by: Columbia Pictures
- Release date: October 1966
- Running time: 110 minutes
- Country: United States
- Language: English
- Box office: $1.4 million (est. US/ Canada rentals)

Alvarez Kelly is a 1966 American Western film set in the American Civil War directed by Edward Dmytryk and starring William Holden and Richard Widmark. The picture was based on the historic Beefsteak Raid of September 1864 led by Confederate Major General Wade Hampton III.

== Plot ==
Mexican cattleman Alvarez Kelly is contracted to deliver a herd to the Union Army in Virginia. After a 3-month cattle drive, he is 10 days late in delivering the herd, and Major Albert Stedman informs Kelly that he must now take the cattle by rail to a plantation in Virginia, 30 miles (48.3 km) south of Richmond at only $1 a head extra.

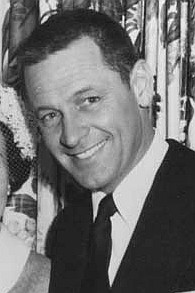
William Holden plays Alvarez Kelly

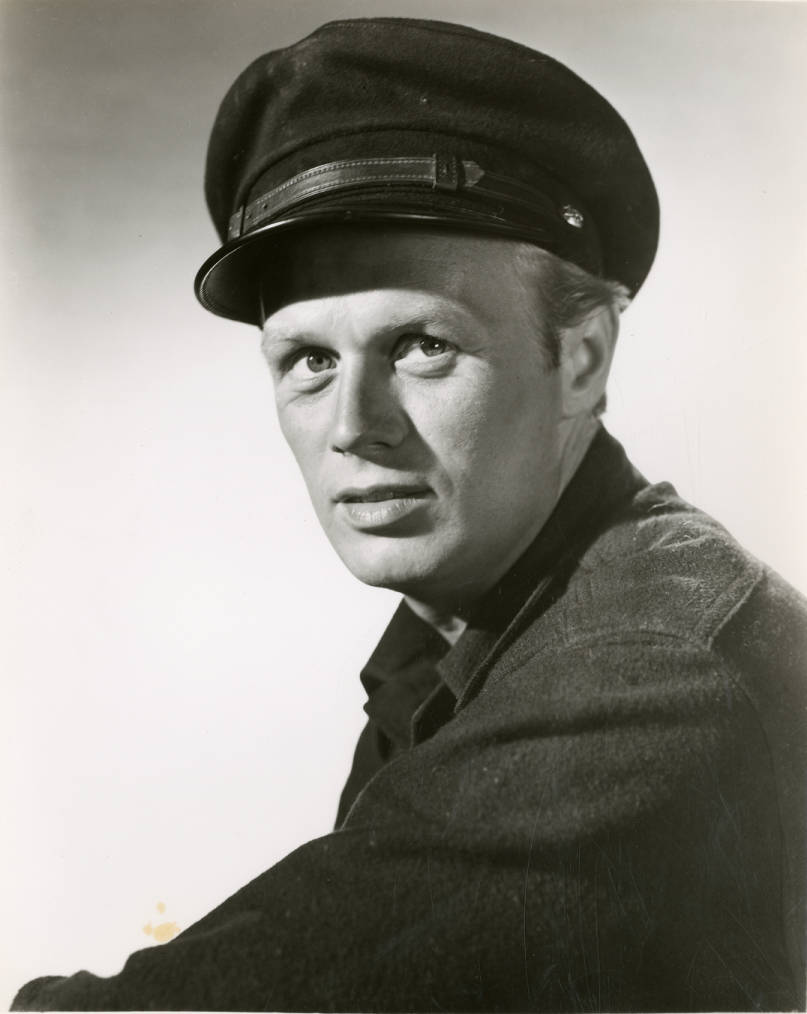
Richard Widmark plays Confederate Colonel Tom Rossiter

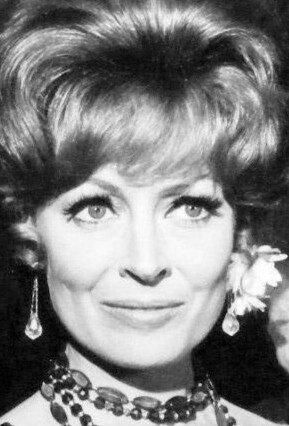
Victoria Shaw plays Charity Warrick

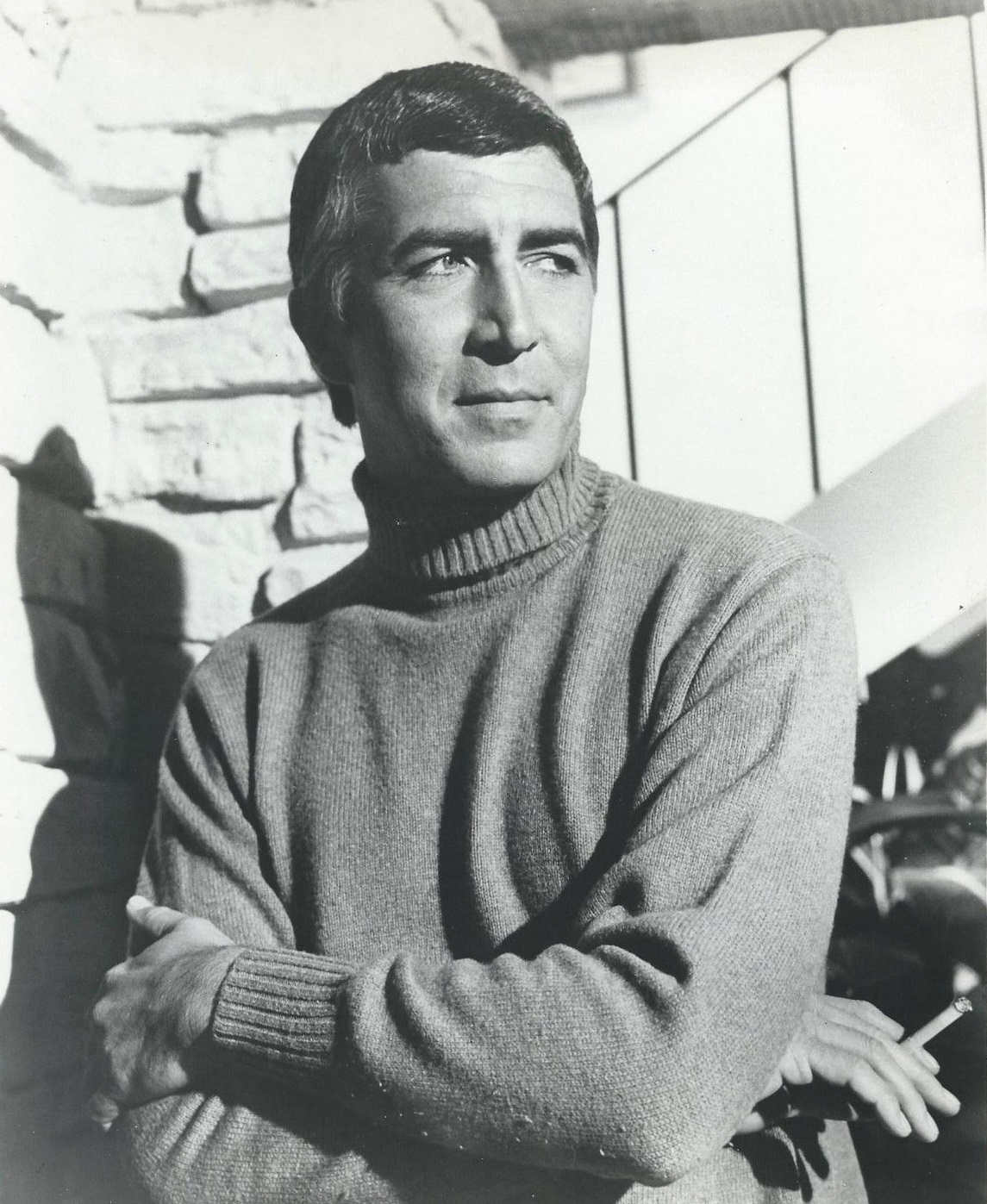
Patrick O’Neal plays US Major Albert Stedman

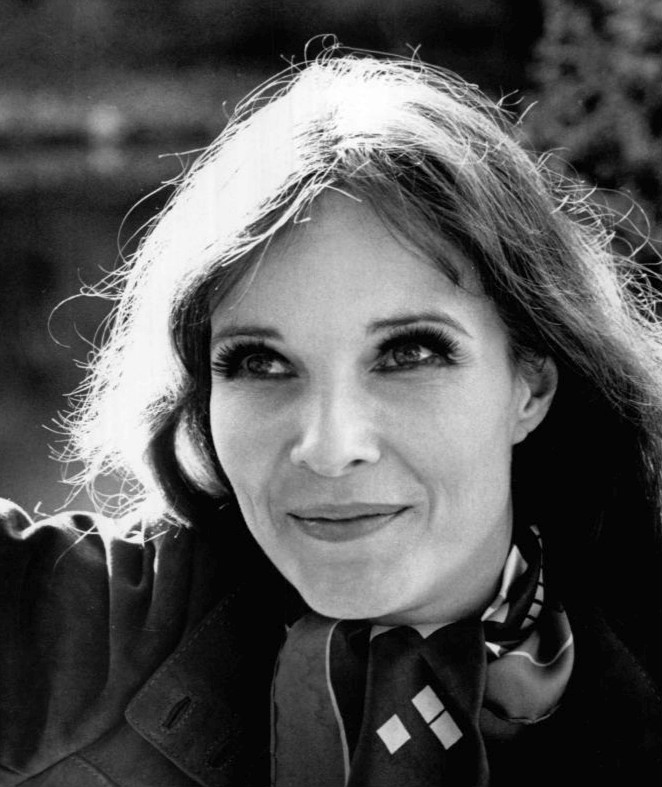
Janice Rule plays Liz Pickering

Outside of Richmond, widow Charity Warrick coldly authorizes them to graze the herd at her plantation for one night only. Stedman pays Kelly the balance of the revised $52,500 contract, he and Warrick expressing disdain at Kelly's profiteering by buying cattle at $2 a head and reselling them for $20 a head. Kelly cynically points out that Stedman will profit by the prestige of his rank of Colonel in his law career. Warrick profits by having the cattle grazed in a specific pasture with overworked soil in need of fertilizing by manure.

When Stedman is called away on military business, Charity sets up Kelly to be kidnapped by Confederate raiders. Their Colonel, Tom Rossiter, having lost an eye in battle and wearing an eye patch, confiscates the money paid to Kelly. The Confederacy desperately needs beef to feed besieged soldiers in Richmond. Since Confederate money is worthless, Kelly resists an offer of double the Union contract to help shanghai and deliver the stolen herd to Richmond. He resists all persuasion until Rossiter shoots off one of Kelly's fingers, threatening to shoot off another every day until Kelly agrees to terms. Kelly's money is returned to him in payment.

Untrusting, Rossiter orders that Kelly always be accompanied by a guard. Plotting revenge, Kelley turns his charm on Rossiter's fiancée, Liz Pickering, at a gala. Pickering asks Kelly to come stealthily to her house after midnight to consult on a private matter. Kelly misdirects Rossiter's guard by visiting a brothel, going to a private room with a prostitute and paying her to stay alone while he slips away through a window to meet with Pickering. Pickering recounts that in the early years of the war she begged Rossiter to marry her, but he feared losing an arm next, or a leg—which she could bear. That night, however, she realized that Rossiter most feared losing his sight; she couldn't bear being married to a broken man. Pickering asks Kelly to help her leave blockaded Richmond. Later, Rossiter wonders why Kelly returned to the brothel after slipping from custody.

Kelly meets with blockade runner Captain Ferguson, arranging passage for Pickering and her maid to leave Richmond. Pickering wishes Kelly would join her, but Kelly points out that Rossiter's guard, who is outside the restaurant waiting for him, would restrain him. Later, on hearing the horn of Ferguson's ship signal that it is leaving Richmond, Rossiter mocks Kelly, gloating that Kelly wasted his money, since he's not on the ship. Kelly replies that the money was well spent, taking Pickering away as his revenge for his maimed hand. Rossiter tells Kelly that the book is not closed—yet. As they set off to capture the cattle, Rossiter orders Sergeant Hatcher to kill Kelly if anything happens to him (Rossiter).

Despite the hatred between the two men, and an unsuccessful attempt by Kelly to slip away during the operation, they work together to capture the herd from the Union Army. With the Union Army in hot pursuit, Kelly comes up with a plan, provided that Rossiter cancel any order to shoot him at the mission's end. Kelly's plan is for 100 Confederates to stampede 2,500 cattle through 300 Union cavalry, over a bridge, then blow up the bridge. During the skirmish, Rossiter sees Kelly risk his life to retrieve a fallen Confederate officer. Stedman shoots Rossiter. When Rossiter sees Hatcher intend to shoot Kelly against orders and honor, Rossiter shoots Hatcher.

Having won the skirmish, Kelly says to the wounded Rossiter: "You got one eye, looks like now you got one lung. Keep fighting like this, looks like you'll end up with one of everything."

Rossiter replies: "You seem to manage pretty well yourself, for a nine-fingered man."

== Cast ==
- William Holden as Alvarez Kelly
- Richard Widmark as Col. Tom Rossiter
- Janice Rule as Liz Pickering
- Patrick O'Neal as Major Albert Stedman
- Victoria Shaw as Charity Warwick
- Roger C. Carmel as Capt. Angus Ferguson
- Richard Rust as Sergeant Hatcher
- Arthur Franz as Capt. Towers
- Don "Red" Barry as Lt. Farrow (as Donald Barry)
- Duke Hobbie as John Beaurider
- Harry Carey Jr. as Cpl. Peterson
- Howard Caine as McIntyre
- Mauritz Hugo as Ely Harrison
- Barry Atwater as General Kautz (as G.B. Atwater)
- Robert Morgan as Capt. Williams
- Paul Lukather as Capt. Webster
- Stephanie Hill as Mary Ann
- Indus Arthur as Melinda
- Clint Ritchie as Union Lt.

== Production ==
The film was shot in the vicinity of Baton Rouge, Louisiana substituting for central Virginia and the Civil War battlefield areas around the Confederate and state capital of Richmond and Petersburg encircled and under siege in 1864.

== Reception ==
The film was generally well received by critics. Bosley Crowther of The New York Times remarked that it was "a good picture—nice and crisp and tough", praised the script writer Franklin Coen for "blueprinting a fresh idea, and salting it with some tingling, unstereotyped behavior and gristly dialogue". He further praised the cinematography, the casting of Holden and Widmark, which he considered "sardonic perfection", and added that the "picture perks up beautifully in the ripely-detailed homestretch". Variety praised the action sequences with the cattle stampede but, unlike Crowther, thought there were some issues with the script which they believed "overdevelops some characters and situations, and underdevelops others".

Author John H. Lenihan compares the film to The Good, the Bad, and the Ugly, in that both films "offer no consolation in their vivid deglamorization of war. The heroes, or antiheroes, of both films pursue selfish pecuniary ventures as a conscious alternative to becoming committed in a pointless destructive war".
