= Paul Dunlap =

American composer (1919–2010)

Background information
- Birth name: Paul A. Dunlap
- Born: July 19, 1919
- Origin: Springfield, Ohio, United States
- Died: March 11, 2010 (aged 90) Palm Springs, California
- Genres: Film score, Soundtrack
- Occupation(s): Composer, Arranger
- Years active: 1950–1980

Paul Dunlap (July 19, 1919 – March 11, 2010) was an American composer. He wrote music for over 200 films during his 30-year career. He is best known for his work with Western movies.

== Early life ==
William Paul Dunlap was born to William P. and Janice P. Dunlap in 1919. He was born in Springfield, Ohio. He studied with Arnold Schoenberg, Nadia Boulanger, and Ernst Toch. He wanted to be a concert hall or opera composer; however, there was a greater opportunity to build a career as a composer in the film industry. When he was 31 years old, Dunlap left for Hollywood to begin his career.

== Career ==
Dunlap's film career began in 1950 when he scored The Baron of Arizona. This was a Sam Fuller film, and led to Dunlap producing other scores for his movies like The Naked Kiss and Shock Corridor. During the 1950s and 60s, Dunlap also wrote music for low-budget films in the horror and sci-fi genres.

Dunlap wrote the scores for as more than 200 films and television programs throughout his career. These included several Three Stooges feature films, including The Three Stooges Meet Hercules, The Three Stooges in Orbit, The Three Stooges Go Around the World in a Daze and The Outlaws Is Coming. Dunlap also scored the last Abbott and Costello film Dance With Me, Henry as well. Dunlap is also known for his scores for numerous genre-films including I Was a Teenage Werewolf, I Was a Teenage Frankenstein, Blood of Dracula, and The Angry Red Planet.

His career spanned three decades and he contributed as musical director, musical supervisor, and orchestrator. He wrote soundtracks for several movies by Harold D. Schuster. Dunlap also worked on many B movies during his career and was recognized for his Western scores.

Throughout his life, Dunlap did not forget his love of classical music. He wrote piano concertos and choral music after his retirement from Hollywood films in 1968. In his later life, he wrote an opera. He composed again for movies, however, when he wrote the music for Gorp which was produced in 1980.

== Death ==
Dunlap died of natural causes on March 11, 2010, in Palm Springs, California.

== Selected filmography ==
- The Baron of Arizona (1950)
- Hi-Jacked (1950)
- The Steel Helmet (1951)
- Cry Danger (1951)
- Little Big Horn (1951)
- Lost Continent (1951)
- Journey into Light (1951)
- The San Francisco Story (1952)
- Breakdown (1952)
- Big Jim McLain (1952)
- Park Row (1952)
- Hellgate (1952)
- Fort Vengeance (1953)
- Hannah Lee (1953)
- The Royal African Rifles (1953)
- Combat Squad (1953)
- Jack Slade (1953)
- Duffy of San Quentin (1954)
- Loophole (1954)
- Fangs of the Wild (1954)
- Dragonfly Squadron (1954)
- Return from the Sea (1954)
- Shield for Murder (1954)
- Target Earth (1954)
- Cry Vengeance (1954)
- Black Tuesday (1954)
- Big House, U.S.A. (1955)
- Stranger on Horseback (1955)
- Finger Man (1955)
- Fort Yuma (1955)
- The Return of Jack Slade (1955)
- Desert Sands (1955)
- Shack Out on 101 (1955)
- Last of the Desperados (1955)
- Three Bad Sisters (1956)
- The Wild Dakotas (1956)
- Crime Against Joe (1956)
- Ghost Town (1956)
- The Come On (1956)
- Walk the Dark Street (1956)
- The Broken Star (1956)
- The Three Outlaws (1956)
- Frontier Gambler (1956)
- Magnificent Roughnecks (1956)
- Strange Intruder (1956)
- The Cruel Tower(1956)
- Emergency Hospital (1956)
- The Brass Legend (1956)
- Stagecoach to Fury (1956)
- Dance with Me, Henry(1956)
- The Women of Pitcairn Island (1956)
- Crime of Passion (1957)
- The Quiet Gun (1957)
- Curfew Breakers (1957)
- Dragoon Wells Massacre (1957)
- Lure of the Swamp (1957)
- I Was a Teenage Werewolf (1957)
- God Is My Partner (1957)
- Apache Warrior (1957)
- Portland Exposé (1957)
- Under Fire (1957)
- Guns Don't Argue (1957)
- Young and Dangerous (1957)
- I Was a Teenage Frankenstein (1957)
- Blood of Dracula (1957)
- Oregon Passage (1957)
- Gun Fever (1958)
- Toughest Gun in Tombstone (1958)
- How to Make a Monster (1958)
- Frankenstein 1970 (1958)
- Gang War (1958)
- Wolf Larsen (1958)
- Frontier Gun (1958)
- The Power of the Resurrection (1958)
- Lone Texan (1959)
- Invisible Invaders (1959)
- The Rebel Set (1959)
- The Oregon Trail (1959)
- Here Come the Jets (1959)
- Five Gates to Hell (1959)
- The Four Skulls of Jonathan Drake (1959)
- The Angry Red Planet (1959)
- The Purple Gang (1959)
- The Rookie (1959)
- Desire in the Dust (1960)
- Walk Like a Dragon (1960)
- Twelve Hours to Kill (1960)
- The Three Stooges in Orbit (1962)
- The Three Stooges Meet Hercules (1962)
- Black Zoo (1963)
- The Three Stooges Go Around the World in a Daze (1963)
- Shock Corridor (1963)
- Law of the Lawless (1964)
- The Naked Kiss (1964)
- Stage to Thunder Rock (1964)
- Young Fury (1965)
- The Outlaws Is Coming (1965)
- Destination Inner Space (1966)
- Dimension 5 (1966)
- Cyborg 2087 (1966)
- Castle of Evil (1966)
- The Money Jungle (1968)
- Panic in the City (1968)
- Gorp (1980)
