= Arthur C. Pierce =

American film director and screenwriter (1923–1987)

Arthur C. Pierce (September 8, 1923 – November 17, 1987) was an American screenwriter and director specialising in low budget science fiction films.

== Biography ==
Pierce, a native of Dallas, enlisted in the US Navy during the Second World War serving as a combat photographer in the Pacific under Edward Steichen. Following the war, Pierce unsuccessfully attempted to produce a film about US Navy submarines entitled The Silent Service starring Robert Montgomery.

He studied drama and worked as an actor and stage manager in various stage productions. Beginning in 1948, Pierce worked for Raphael G. Wolff Studios, an industrial film production company, for three years. Pierce acted as a cameraman contributing to over 100 industrial films made throughout North America. In 1952 he joined the Howard Anderson Company that produced special effects for various motion pictures where he acquired a strong knowledge of optical effects.

Pierce entered the world of screenwriting through his friend Mark Hanna, a screenwriter and actor. His first work was 1959's The Cosmic Man starring John Carradine that had many of the same ideas as The Day the Earth Stood Still. Pierce then wrote the screenplay for Beyond the Time Barrier for Robert Clarke and Edgar G. Ulmer. This was a low-budget film designed to exploit The Time Machine. Pierce also appeared as one of the mutants.

Renowned and typecast for low budget science fiction, Pierce worked his way up to producing and directing The Human Duplicators and Mutiny in Outer Space both without credit. Pierce's first directorial credits were Women of the Prehistoric Planet (1965) and the non-science fiction The Las Vegas Hillbillys (1966). Pierce also wrote several spy-fi films including The Human Duplicators (1965), Dimension 5 (1966), and The Destructors (1966).

In the 1970s Pierce wrote for the American television series Fantasy Island and The Next Step Beyond.
