= Michel Fournier =

French cinematographer

Michel Fournier (1945 – December 2008) was a French cinematographer.

== Career ==
Fournier is most famous for his early collaborations with director Philippe Garrel. He has also worked with French director Luc Moullet. He worked as cinematographer on the following French films: Marie pour mémoire, Le Révélateur, Acéphale, La Concentration, Le Lit de la vierge, La Cicatrice intérieure, Athanor, and Anatomie d'un rapport.
