= James Shigeta =

American actor (1929–2014)

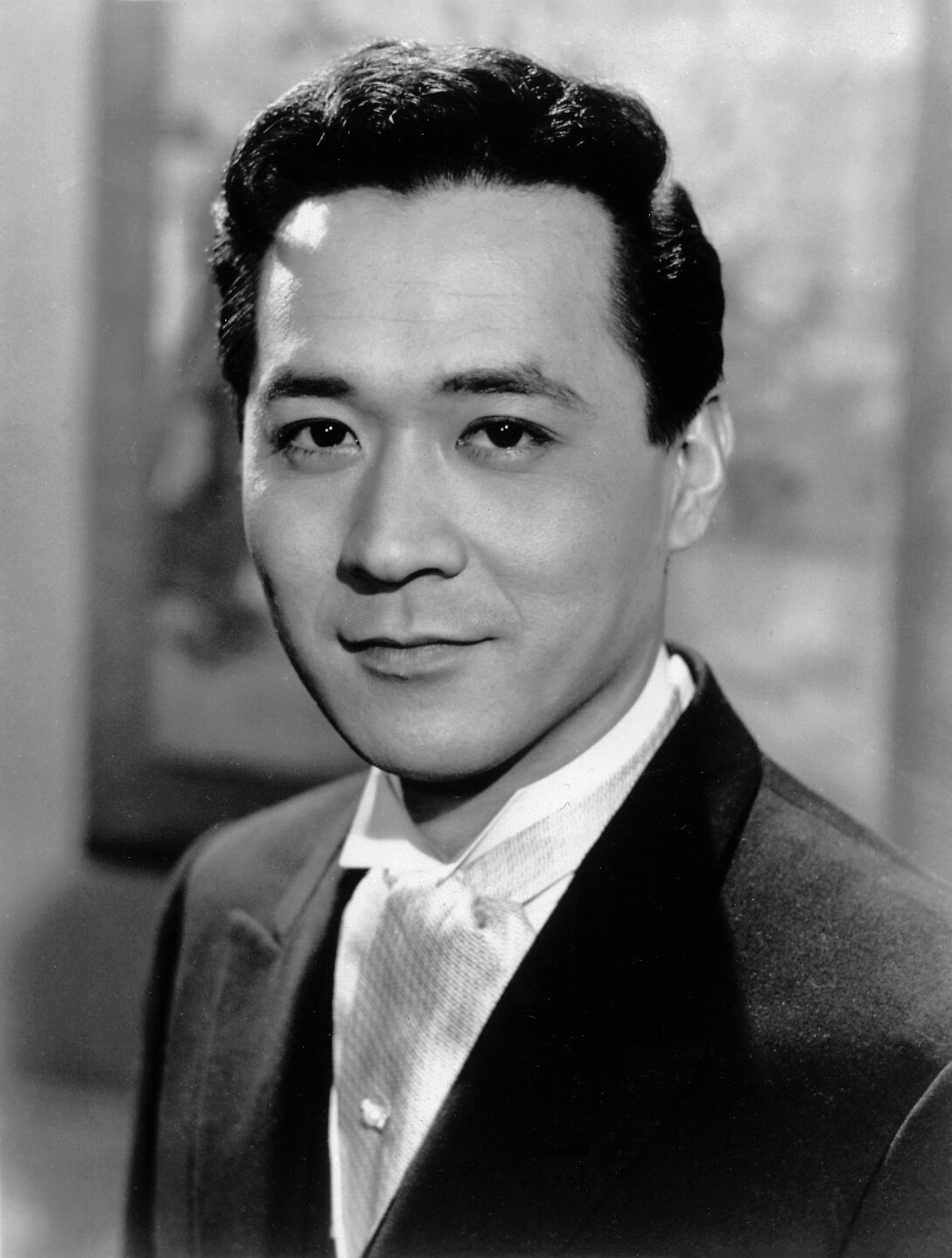
- Shigeta in a publicity photo for Bridge to the Sun (1961)
- Born: James Saburo Shigeta; June 17, 1929; Honolulu, Territory of Hawaii, U.S.
- Died: July 28, 2014 (aged 85); Los Angeles, California, U.S.
- Resting place: National Memorial Cemetery of the Pacific
- Other name: Guy Brion; Jimmy Shigeta
- Education: New York University
- Occupations: Actor; singer
- Years active: 1950–2009
- Musical career
- Genres: Traditional pop; big band; jazz
- Instrument: Vocals
- Labels: Toho Records; Choreo Records; Decca; Ava Records
- Military career
- Allegiance: United States
- Branch: Hawaii National Guard; Marine Corps
- Service years: 1951–1954
- Rank: Staff sergeant
- Conflicts: Korean War

James Saburo Shigeta (Japanese: 繁田 三郎; June 17, 1929 – July 28, 2014) was an American actor and singer. He was known for his roles in the films The Crimson Kimono (1959), Walk Like a Dragon (1960), Flower Drum Song (1961), Bridge to the Sun (1961), Midway (1976), Die Hard (1988), and Mulan (1998). In 1960, he won the Golden Globe Award for Most Promising Newcomer – Male, along with three other actors.

In his early career, Shigeta often played romantic male lead roles, which were almost nonexistent for an actor of Asian descent during his time, making him a trailblazer in Asian-American representation in media. The Goldsea Asian-American daily magazine listed him as one of the "Most Inspiring Asian Americans of All Time".

Before his Hollywood career he found success as a pop singer and performer abroad, especially in Japan and Australia.

== Early life and education ==
Shigeta was born in the Territory of Hawaii in 1929, as a sansei, a third-generation Japanese American. His father, Howard Koichi Shigeta, was born as a nisei in Hāna, Hawaii, while his mother, Satoko Tamura Shigeta, had immigrated from Japan (issei). His paternal grandfather, Denkichi Shigeta, was from Ōshima, Yamaguchi. Shigeta was the third of six children. He and his family were placed in internment camps during World War II because they were of Japanese descent. Shigeta was a 1947 graduate of President Theodore Roosevelt High School, and studied drama at New York University.

After completing ROTC, he enlisted in the Hawaii National Guard's 298th Infantry, prior to his 1951 enlistment in the U.S. Marine Corps during the Korean War. He served for two-and-a-half years, and rose to the rank of staff sergeant. He was enroute to Korea when the cease fire was declared.

== Career ==
=== Singing ===
Shigeta entered and won first prize on Ted Mack's television talent show, The Original Amateur Hour in 1950. Embarking on a singing career in Los Angeles, he teamed with Hawaiian operatic tenor Charles K.L. Davis. Their agent at the time gave them the non-ethnic-sounding stage names of "Guy Brion" for Shigeta, and "Charles Durand" for Davis. They developed a supper-club musical career in the United States, singing at venues such as the Mocambo and the Los Angeles Players Club. Despite that success, breaking into the movies eluded him.

During the Korean War, Shigeta enlisted in the United States Marine Corps, where he entertained troops in California. En route to Korea, the ceasefire led Shigeta to Japan, where he was discharged from the Marines and hired by the theatrical division of Toho Studios.

Shigeta did not speak Japanese until Toho Studios in Tokyo invited him to be a musical star under his real name in Japan. He became a success in all media aspects of his day—radio, television, stage, supper clubs, movies, recordings—to such an extent that he became widely known as "The Frank Sinatra of Japan".

In 1958, the Nichigeki Theatre in Tokyo exported their extravaganza Cherry Blossom Show to Australia with Shigeta as the male lead, opposite Fubuki Koshiji. The show was performed at the Empire Theatre in Sydney, Her Majesty's Theatre in Brisbane, the Theatre Royal in Adelaide, and Her Majesty's Theatre in Melbourne. The show was a big success, with one Australian reviewer writing about Shigeta, "... has matinee idol good looks and a soothing baritone voice that should send the record companies mad for his autograph on recording contracts."

Shigeta returned to the United States to sing on The Dinah Shore Show. By 1959 he was the star of the Shirley MacLaine–Steve Parker production of Holiday in Japan at the New Frontier Hotel and Casino in Las Vegas.

In 1969, Shigeta toured the United States in the lead role of The King and I, with Melva Niles and Pam Cavan co-starring in the production.

=== Acting ===
When movies began to open up for him, Shigeta took acting lessons from seasoned dialogue coach Leon Charles.

Shigeta first came on screen in the U.S., in 1959 as Detective Joe Kojaku in The Crimson Kimono, a detective story that featured an interracial romantic triangle between Kojaku, his partner Sgt. Charlie Bancroft (played by Glenn Corbett), and Christine Downes (portrayed by Victoria Shaw). Shigeta's character was groundbreaking for the 1950s, an Asian-American detective played by an Asian-American actor with regular American speech patterns, rather than a non-Asian made up to pass as Asian who speaks in broken English.

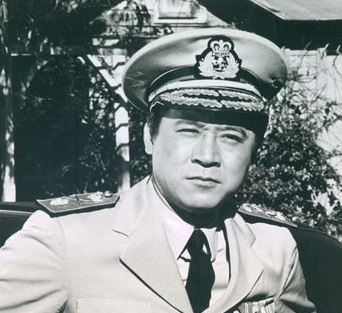
Shigeta in ABC Television publicity photo (1968).

Paramount Pictures and James Clavell cast Shigeta in the 1960 release Walk Like a Dragon, as Cheng Lu, a young Chinese man in the American old west who resents that Chinese must be subservient to white people. When filming began, Shigeta was still starring in Holiday in Japan in Las Vegas. An arrangement was made to transport him after his last show to the Paramount studio by ambulance to make sure he arrived on time. The technical advisor to Shigeta on the film was Benson Fong, who taught Shigeta how to mount a horse Chinese style. Jack Lord has first billing in this movie, which pits Shigeta against Lord for the affections of Kim Sung, played by Nobu McCarthy. Shigeta and McCarthy would work together again in the 1965 Perry Mason episode, "The Case of the Wrongful Writ," while Shigeta and Lord would work together in the 1968 Hawaii Five-O episode "Deathwatch".

The 1961 romantic comedy Cry for Happy had Shigeta co-starring with Glenn Ford, Donald O'Connor and Miyoshi Umeki in a tale about Korean War era United States Navy photographers in Japan.

In 1961, Shigeta was cast as Wang Ta, a role originated by Ed Kenney on Broadway, in the Academy Award-nominated movie version of Rodgers and Hammerstein's Flower Drum Song with Nancy Kwan and Miyoshi Umeki playing the love interests.

He was cast as World War II Japanese diplomat Hidenari Terasaki opposite Carroll Baker as Gwen Terasaki in the 1961 biographical movie Bridge to the Sun. A rarity for its era, the movie told the true story of a racially mixed marriage set against the background of the war between the United States and Japan.

Shigeta guest starred in many television shows, beginning with Alcoa Premiere in 1961, as a Korean War era Chinese Communist who tortured star Lloyd Bridges. He continued to act in television up through Avatar: The Last Airbender in 2005.

In 1965, Shigeta starred in Paradise, Hawaiian Style with Elvis Presley.

In 1965, Shigeta worked with Raymond Burr in the Perry Mason episode "The Case of the Wrongful Writ", cast as lawyer Ward Toyama who finds himself as the defendant. Shigeta worked with Raymond Burr two more times, in the 1969 Ironside episode "Love My Enemy", and the 1971 episode "No Motive for Murder" of the same series.

From 1969 to 1972, Shigeta had recurring appearances on the TV hospital drama Medical Center, in which he alternately appeared as the Resident Doctor and Doctor Osaka, for seven episodes. He played the role of Chief Resident in the series 1969 2-hour pilot U.M.C.

In 1974, Emergency!. He is known for playing the character in the episode "Foreign Trade," where he offers Dixie a promotion to nursing supervisor.

He also continued starring in films. In 1976, he portrayed the famous Japanese admiral Chūichi Nagumo in Midway. In 1988, he played the ill-fated corporate executive Joe Takagi in the action film Die Hard. Cage II: The Arena of Death from 1994 pits star Lou Ferrigno against Shigeta's character of underworld crime boss Tim Yum Yum. Shigeta lent his voice to Disney's 1998 animated film Mulan.

== Awards and honors ==
James Shigeta shared the 1960 Golden Globe Award for Most Promising Male Newcomer with actors George Hamilton, Troy Donahue and Barry Coe.

In 2005, Shigeta received a "Visionary Award" from the Asian-American theatre organization, East West Players, at their annual anniversary gala in Los Angeles.

In 2006, Shigeta was among the actors, producers and directors interviewed in the documentary The Slanted Screen, directed by Jeff Adachi, about the representation of Asian and Asian-American men in Hollywood.

== Death ==
Shigeta died in his sleep on July 28, 2014, at age 85 in West Hollywood, California. His funeral was held at the First Congregational Church of Los Angeles, and he was interred in the National Memorial Cemetery of the Pacific.

== Filmography ==
=== Film ===
Year	Title	Role	Director	Notes
1959	The Crimson Kimono	Detective Joe Kojaku	Samuel Fuller	Golden Globe Award for Most Promising Newcomer – Male
1960	Walk Like a Dragon	Cheng Lu	James Clavell	
1961	Cry for Happy	Suzuki	George Marshall	
1961	Bridge to the Sun	Hidenari Terasaki	Étienne Périer	
1961	Flower Drum Song	Wang Ta	Henry Koster	
1966	Paradise, Hawaiian Style	Danny Kohana	Mickey Moore	
1966	Death Walks in Laredo	Lester Koto	Enzo Peri	
1968	Nobody's Perfect	Toshi O'Hara	Alan Rafkin	
1968	Manila, Open City	Captain Murakami	Eddie Romero	
1973	Lost Horizon	To Len	Charles Jarrott	
1975	The Yakuza	Goro Tanaka	Sydney Pollack	
1976	Midway	Vice Admiral Chūichi Nagumo	Jack Smight	
1988	Die Hard	Joseph Yoshinobu Takagi	John McTiernan	
1989	Cage	Tin Lum Yin	Lang Elliott	
1990	China Cry	Dr. Sung	James F. Collier	
1994	Cage II: The Arena of Death	Tim Lum Yin	Lang Elliott	
1995	Midnight Man	Mao Mak	John Weidner	
1996	Space Marines	Ambassador Nakamura	John Weidner	
1997	Drive	Mr. Lau	Steve Wang	
1998	Mulan	General Li (voice)	Barry Cook; Tony Bancroft	
2000	Brother	Sugimoto	Takeshi Kitano	
2002	A Ribbon of Dreams	Jimmy Chan	Philip W. Chung	
2009	The People I've Slept With	Charles Yang	Quentin Lee	

=== Television ===
Year	Title	Role	Notes
1961	Alcoa Premiere	Captain	Episode: "The Fortress"
1961	Playdate	Major Ri	Episode: "The Cell 5 Experience"
1962	Naked City	James Kam	Episode: "The Contract"
1963	Dr. Kildare	Dr. Roy Shigera	Episode: "One Clear Bright Thursday Morning"
1963–64	The Outer Limits	Major Jong / Captain Newa	Episode: "Nightmare" / Episode: "The Inheritors (Pt 1)"
1964	Burke's Law	Sidney Ying	Episode: "Who Killed the Paper Dragon?"
1964	The Lieutenant	Captain Myang Lee	Episode: "To Kill a Man"
1964	A Carol for Another Christmas	The Doctor	Television film
1965	The Bing Crosby Show	Joe	Episode: "That's the Way the Suki Yakies"
1965	Perry Mason	Ward Toyama	Episode: "The Case of the Wrongful Writ"
1965	I Spy	Tommy	Episode: "Three Hours on a Sunday Night"
1965	Ben Casey	Dr. Harvey Lee / Father Michael Hsueh	3 episodes
1967	The Mystery of the Chinese Junk	George Ti Ming	Television film
1968	It Takes a Thief	Fong Sing	Episode: "When Good Friends Get Together"
1968	Escape to Mindanao	Lieutenant Takahashi	Television film
1968	Hawaii Five-O	Joseph Matsukino	Episode: "Deathwatch"
1969–71	Ironside	Toshio Watari / Il Pak Soong	2 episodes
1970	Mission: Impossible	Shiki	Episode: "Butterfly"
1969–72	Medical Center	Dr. Osaka	Recurring role; Seasons 1–3
1974	The Questor Tapes	Dr. Chen	Television film
1974	Emergency!	Mr. O'Brien	Episode: "Foreign Trade"
1975	Matt Helm	Tom McCauley	Episode: "Pilot"
1975	Kung Fu	Master Kwan Li / Colonel Lin Pei	2 episodes
1976	Ellery Queen	Stephen Yang	Episode: "The Adventure of the Judas Tree"
1976	S.W.A.T.	Lieutenant Eddie Chew	Episode: "The Chinese Connection"
1976	The Killer Who Wouldn't Die	David Lao	Television film
1976	The Streets of San Francisco	Prosecutor	2 episodes
1976	Once an Eagle	Lin Tso-Han	Miniseries
1976	The Moneychangers	"Wizard" Wong	Miniseries
1977	Little House on the Prairie	Sam Wing	Episode: "To Live with Fear, Part 2"
1977	The Hardy Boys/Nancy Drew Mysteries	Kapala	Episode: "Wipe-Out"
1978	Police Woman	Bernie Kim	Episode: "The Human Rights of Tiki Kim"
1978	The Rockford Files	Clement Chin	Episode: "Heartaches of a Fool"
1978	Fantasy Island	General Lin Sun	Episode: "Spending Spree/The Hunted"
1979	Samurai	Takeo Chisato	Television film
1980	Enola Gay: The Men, the Mission, the Atomic Bomb	Field Marshal Abehata	Television film
1982	The Greatest American Hero	Colonel Shawn Liang	Episode: "The Hand-Painted Thai"
1982	Tomorrow's Child	Donald Shibura	Television film
1982	The Renegades	Jimmy Lee	Television film
1982	Strike Force	Leong	Episode: "Chinatown"
1983	T. J. Hooker	Chow Duc Khan	Episode: "Chinatown"
1983	Masquerade	Makko	Episode: "Girls for Sale"
1984	The Love Boat	M. Yasamoto	2 episodes
1984	Matt Houston	Lin Ha	Episode: "Blood Money"
1985	Airwolf	Colonel Tranh Van Zung	Episode: "The American Dream"
1986	The Family Martinez	Judge Yamamoto	Television film
1986	Magnum, P.I.	Mr. Obotu	Episode: "Paper War"
1986	Magnum, P.I.	Dr. Richard Enoka	Episode: "Forty Years from Sand Island"
1987	The Hitchhiker	Nishi	Episode: "Perfect Order"
1987–88	Simon & Simon	Musashi Sato / Chen / Daniel Yoshiro	3 episodes
1989	Mission: Impossible	Ki	Episode: "The Lions"
1989	Dragnet	Mr. Minn	Episode: "The Payback"
1989	A Peaceable Kingdom	Dr. Okawa	Episode: "Snake Bite"
1989	Jake and the Fatman	Koso Nakasone	Episode: "The Way You Look Tonight"
1987–92	Murder, She Wrote	John Sukahara / Luc Lee	2 episodes
1994	seaQuest DSV	President Hoy Chi	2 episodes
1994	Hart to Hart: Old Friends Never Die	Detective Whoo	Television film
1994	Babylon 5	Taro Isogi	Episode: "Spider in the Web"
1994	Renegade	Mr. Ota / Hideo Maruyama	Episodes: "Samurai" & "Black Wind"
1996	Cybill	Mr. Matsuzaki	Episode: "Cybill and Maryann Go to Japan"
1997	The Real Adventures of Jonny Quest	Inspector Mantjur / Mr. Yamashiro / Japanese Prime Minister (voices)	2 episodes
1999	Beverly Hills, 90210	Ben Sosna	Recurring role; Seasons 9–10
2004	Threat Matrix	Kang Sok-Joo	Episode: "PPX"
2005	Avatar: The Last Airbender	Old Wanderer (voice)	Episode: "The Spirit World-Winter Solstice, Part 1"
