= Neyle Morrow =

American film and television actor

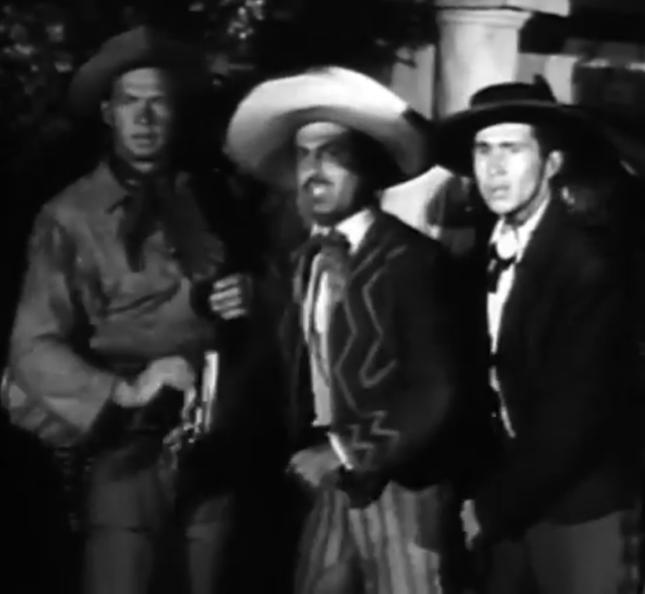
- Morrow (right) with Bill Williams and Don Diamond in The Adventures of Kit Carson, 1951
- Born: Francis Neyle Marx Jr. October 28, 1914; Jacksonville, Florida, U.S.
- Died: September 30, 2006 (aged 91); Los Angeles, California, U.S.
- Occupations: Film and television actor
- Years active: 1940–1964

Francis Neyle Marx Jr. (October 28, 1914 – September 30, 2006) was an American film and television actor. He regularly appeared in films made by film director Samuel Fuller.

== Life and career ==
Morrow was born in Jacksonville, Florida. He began his screen career in 1940, appearing in the film Drums of the Desert. In the same year he appeared in the films Meet the Wildcat and Three Men from Texas. In 1941, Morrow starred in the film The Phantom Cowboy, and appeared in the film Raiders of the Desert. Later film appearances include Danger in the Pacific (1942), Where Are Your Children? (1943), The Cisco Kid Returns (1945), Spoilers of the North (1947), The Big Sombrero (1949), Harbor of Missing Men (1950), Let's Go Navy! (1951) and, The Raiders (1952).

He appeared in Samuel Fuller's The Steel Helmet (1951), Fixed Bayonets! (1951), Park Row (1952). Hell and High Water (1954), Run of the Arrow (1957), The Crimson Kimono (1959), Fuller's unaired 1959 television pilot Dog Face, Underworld U.S.A. (1961) and Shock Corridor (1963). His final film credit was Fuller's 1964 film The Naked Kiss.

Morrow died in September 2006 in Los Angeles, California, at the age of 91. He was buried in Holy Cross Cemetery, Culver City.
