= The Smugglers (1967 film) =

Les Contrebandières
- Directed by: Luc Moullet
- Written by: Luc Moullet
- Produced by: Luc Moullet
- Starring: Françoise Vatel; Monique Thiriet; Albert Juross
- Cinematography: Philippe Théaudière
- Edited by: Cécile Decugis
- Music by: Ahmed Zahar Derradji
- Release date: 11 December 1968 (French)
- Running time: 81 min.
- Language: French

Les Contrebandières, known in English as The Smugglers, is a 1968 film by French director Luc Moullet; it was his second feature film.
