= Constance Towers =

American actress (born 1933)

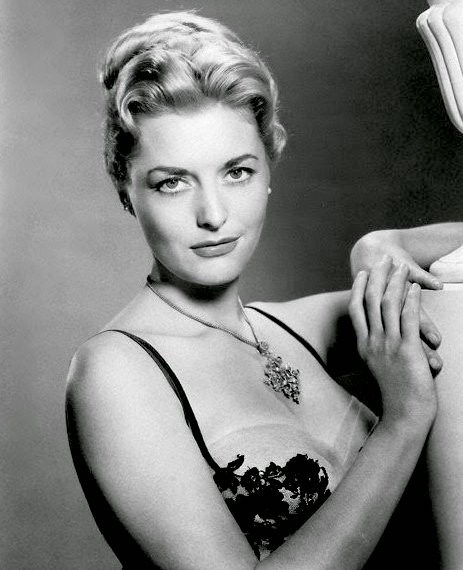
- Towers in 1960
- Born: Constance Mary Towers; May 20, 1933 (age 93); Whitefish, Montana, U.S.
- Education: Juilliard School
- Occupations: Actress, singer
- Years active: 1952–present
- Spouses: Eugene McGrath (m. 1959; div. 1966) John Gavin (m. 1974; died 2018)
- Children: 2

Constance Mary Towers (born May 20, 1933) is an American film, stage, and television actress. She gained prominence for her appearances in several mainstream 1950s films before transitioning to theater, starring in numerous Broadway productions through the 1970s. Her accolades include two Emmy Award nominations.

Beginning in 1965, Towers embarked on a career in theater, making her Broadway debut in the musical Anya, opposite Lillian Gish, followed by a 1966 production of Show Boat at Lincoln Center. Towers starred in four other Broadway productions throughout the 1970s, most notably as Anna in The King and I in 1977 and 1978. Her later career largely has been based in television, with roles as matriarch Clarissa McCandless on the daytime drama Capitol from 1982 to 1987, and the villainous Helena Cassadine on General Hospital, which she began portraying in 1997.

== Early life ==
Towers was born May 20, 1933 in Whitefish, Montana, one of two daughters born to Ardath L. (née Reynolds) and Harry J. Towers, a pharmacist. Her mother, originally from Nebraska, was of Irish descent, while her father was an Ireland native from Dublin, who immigrated to the United States through Philadelphia. Towers' family relocated throughout western Montana in her early childhood, living in Whitefish, Missoula, and Kalispell, as well as in Moscow, Idaho.

In 1940, when Towers was in first grade, she was discovered by talent scouts visiting Montana in search of child actors for radio programs. Towers's family subsequently relocated to Seattle, Washington, and she began working as a child radio actress on Pacific Northwest programs over the following three years. According to her official website, Towers was offered a contract with Paramount Pictures at age 11, but the offer was declined by her parents. At age 12, she worked at a small local movie theater in her hometown of Whitefish.

In her adolescence, her family relocated to New York City after her father took a job there as an executive vice president for a pharmaceutical company. There she attended the Juilliard School, studying music, and American Academy of Dramatic Arts. She studied singing with well-known voice teacher Beverley Peck Johnson.

== Career ==
=== 1955–1964: Early film work ===
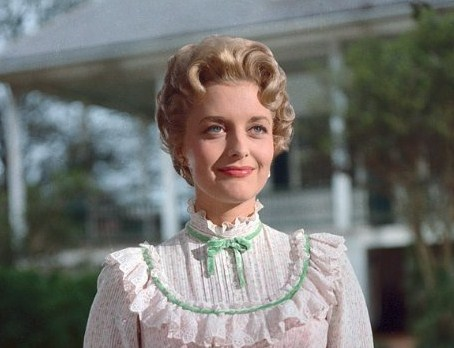
Towers in The Horse Soldiers (1959)

While attending Juilliard, Towers was discovered by a film agent. "I was very lucky," Towers recalled. "An agent saw me and believed in me and we were walking down Fifth Avenue and the manager of the St. Regis Hotel asked if I could sing. My agent told him yes and he asked if I could open in three weeks. I learned a series of songs, put on a dress, sang to the critics, and got good reviews. That night a casting man from Columbia Pictures saw me and flew me to L.A. to meet with Harry Cohn, president of Columbia. They had me read with Jack Lemmon, then signed me to a contract."

Towers made her film debut in a supporting part in the film Bring Your Smile Along (1955), followed by a supporting part in the crime thriller Over-Exposed (1956). Standing at 5 feet 9 inches (1.75 m), Towers initially struggled to obtain leading film roles due to her height. In 1958, she was cast in her first leading role as Hannah Hunter in John Ford's Civil War film The Horse Soldiers (1959) opposite John Wayne and William Holden. The following year, she appeared in Ford's follow-up film Sergeant Rutledge (1960), a racially themed crime Western.

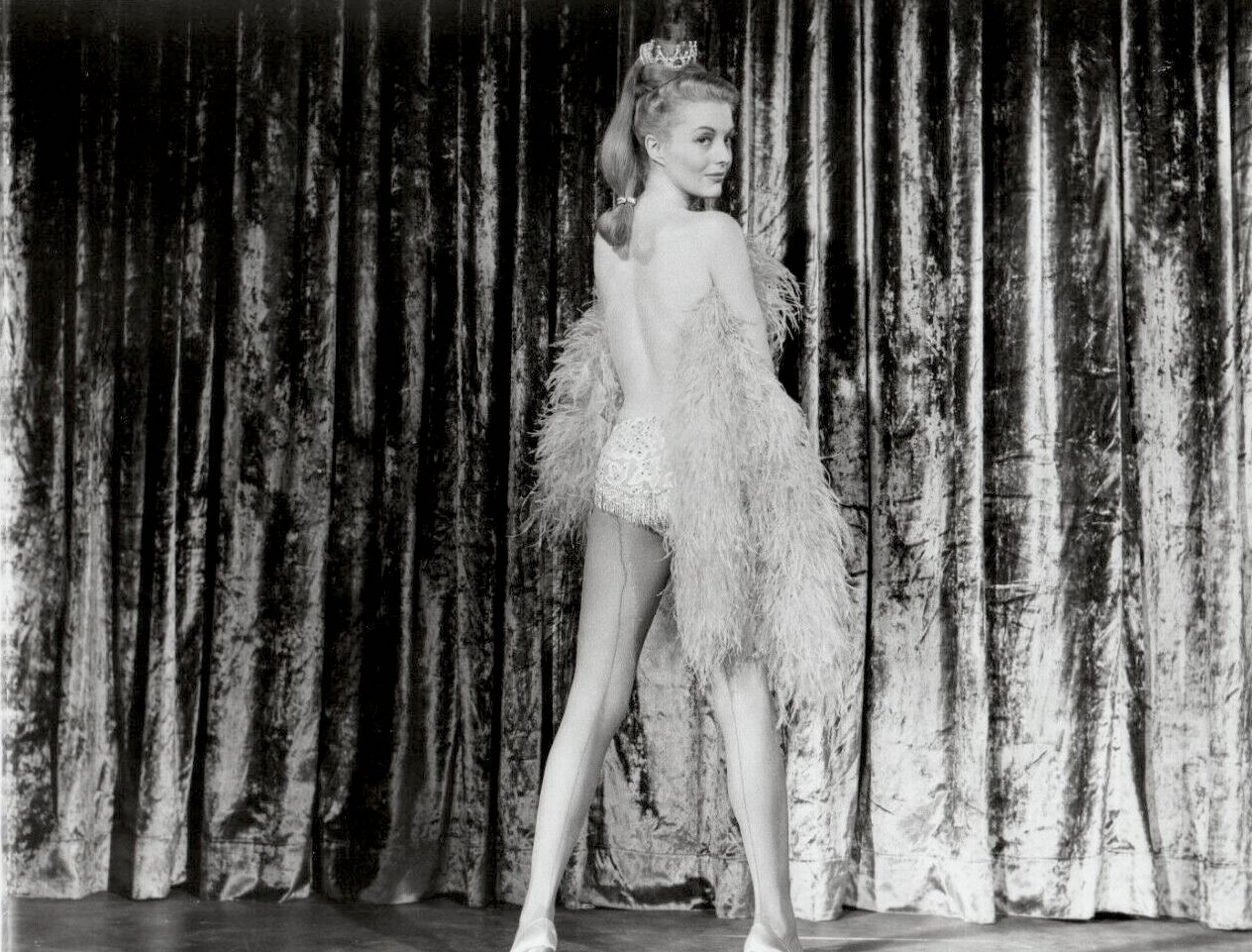
Towers in Shock Corridor (1963)

In 1963, Towers was cast in a supporting role in Samuel Fuller's thriller Shock Corridor (1963), which tells the story of a journalist who commits himself to a psychiatric hospital to solve a murder. Her role as a stripper in the film was described by The New York Times as "hard, driving, and realistic." In preparation for the role, Towers spent time at exotic dance clubs in Los Angeles.

Fuller cast Towers in a lead role in his next film The Naked Kiss (1964), another lurid and hard-edged thriller, in which she plays a crazed prostitute who attempts to assimilate in suburbia after having battered her pimp. Eugene Archer of The New York Times commented: "Patently absurd as the plot may be, Mr. Fuller has filmed it with flair, and he has drawn a richly amusing performance from Miss Towers. Between his stylish handling of sensational nonsense and Mr. Marton's turgid floundering around a serious theme, Mr. Fuller's wild little movie has a decided edge."

The same year, Towers appeared in the thriller Fate Is the Hunter, which chronicles the investigation of an airline crash. She also worked as a model for the Heart Fund Benefit at a fashion show held in Reno, Nevada. Between 1961 and 1965, she had five guest roles on the series Perry Mason; in her first two appearances, Jonny Baker in "The Case of the Missing Melody" (1961) and Esther Metcalfe in "The Case of the Prankish Professor" (1963).

=== 1965–1990: Theater career ===
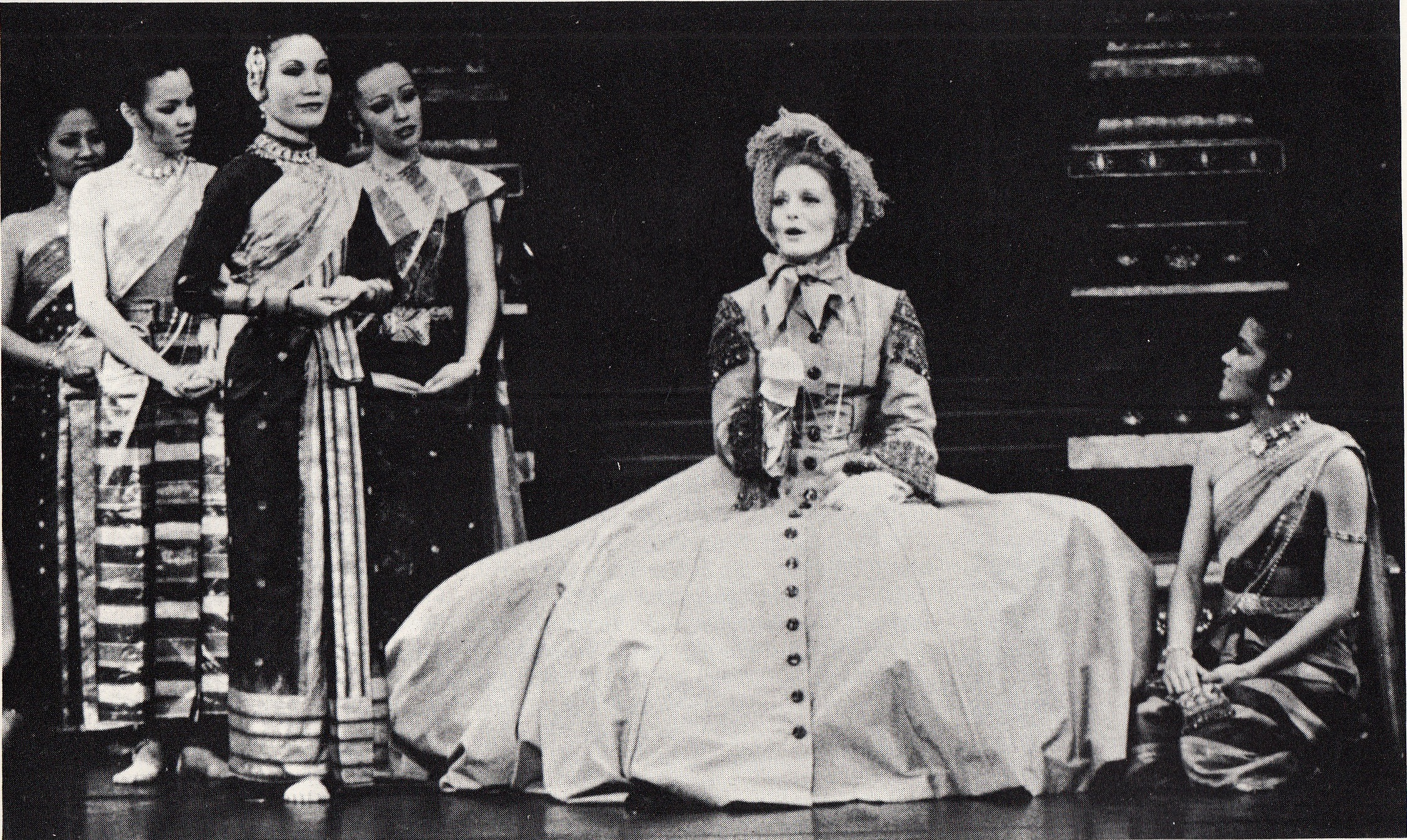
Towers in a Broadway production of The King and I, 1977

After several film, television, and stage roles (including a West Coast tour of Guys and Dolls), Towers made her Broadway debut playing the title role in Anya, a short-lived 1965 musical.

Towers appeared as Julie in a 1966 production of Show Boat at Lincoln Center. She also starred in Carousel in 1966 and The Sound of Music in 1967, which she would reprise in 1970, 1971 and 1980 at the Jones Beach Theater in Long Island, New York.

She briefly played Anna Leonowens in 1968, and later she played opposite Yul Brynner in a long-running revival of The King and I on tour and then on Broadway (1976–1978). Clive Barnes praised Towers in the role, and theatre writer John Kenrick calls her performance on the 1977 cast album "great."

In 1995, she played the role of Phyllis in Stephen Sondheim's Follies.

From the mid-1960s until the 1990s, Towers' career was primarily focused on theater, though she did appear in films occasionally. She starred in the 1974 television film Once in Her Life, which earned her an Emmy Award nomination for Best Actress in a Special Program. She also appeared on television, playing Marian Hiller, the wife of Dr. Sanford Hiller in Love is a Many Splendored Thing (1971–72).

She had a starring role as noble widow Clarissa McCandless in Capitol (1982–87, the show's entire run), playing rival to the scheming matriarch Myrna Clegg (Carolyn Jones, Marla Adams, Marj Dusay) in trying to see her son succeed in politics and the long-term love of powerful Senator Mark Denning (Ed Nelson). A memorable storyline had her being shot by Mark's mentally ill wife Paula (Julie Adams) and later finding out that her husband Baxter (Ron Harper) was still alive. For this part, she received a Soap Opera Digest Nomination for Best Supporting Actress.

=== 1991–present: Television, General Hospital ===
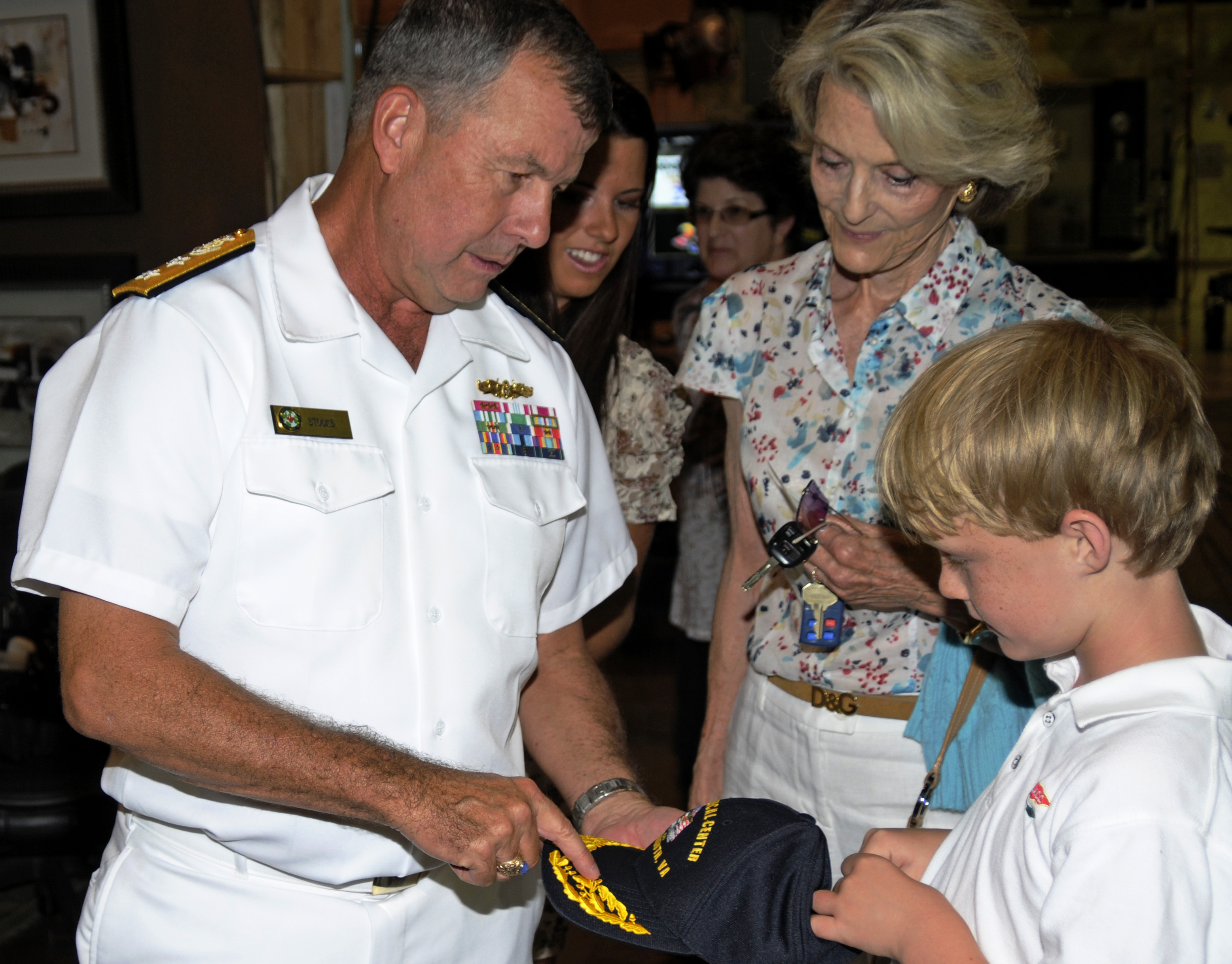
Towers during a visit to the set of the television show General Hospital as part of Los Angeles Navy Week 2011

Towers had a supporting part in the film The Next Karate Kid (1994) and appeared on television as John Abbott's former secretary, Audrey North, on The Young and the Restless (1996). She later played Madame Julianna Deschanel on Sunset Beach (1997). In 1998, Towers had supporting parts in the horror film The Relic (1997), and the thriller A Perfect Murder (1998), playing the mother of Gwyneth Paltrow's character.

Towers' best-known soap part is as villainous Helena Cassadine on General Hospital. She began playing Helena in late 1997, until the character's death in 2015; Towers made additional onscreen guest appearances in 2016, 2017, 2019 and most recently February 2020. In October 2020, Towers briefly reprised the role of Helena in an offscreen cameo; Helena was heard via a phone call.

Towers guest-starred in the Star Trek: Deep Space Nine episode "The Forsaken" in 1993. She also appeared in Designing Women, Frasier, Baywatch, and The Fresh Prince of Bel-Air. Other television roles include State Trooper, Hawaii Five-O, The Rockford Files, L.A. Law, The 4400, and Cold Case.

In 2008, Towers starred in the Los Angeles revival of Arthur Allan Seidelman's production of Six Dance Lessons in Six Weeks; the play premiered at the Geffen Playhouse in 2001 with Uta Hagen and David Hyde Pierce in the two roles.

== Personal life ==
Towers was first married to Eugene McGrath from 1959 until their divorce in 1966. In 1974, she married actor and future ambassador to Mexico John Gavin. She has two children from her first marriage. She also has two stepchildren from her marriage to Gavin. Gavin died on February 9, 2018, aged 86.

Towers serves as chairwoman of the board of directors of the Blue Ribbon of the Los Angeles Music Center.

== Filmography ==
=== Film ===
Year	Title	Role	Director	Notes	Ref.
1955	Bring Your Smile Along	Nancy Willows	Blake Edwards		
1956	Over-Exposed	Shirley Thomas	Lewis Seiler		
1959	The Horse Soldiers	Miss Hannah Hunter of Greenbriar	John Ford		
1960	Sergeant Rutledge	Mary Beecher	John Ford		
1963	Shock Corridor	Cathy	Samuel Fuller		
1964	Fate Is the Hunter	Peg Burke	Ralph Nelson		
1964	The Naked Kiss	Kelly	Samuel Fuller		
1974	Once in Her Life	Joan Baldwin	Peter Levin	Television film Nominated – Emmy Award for Best Actress in a Special Program	
1985	Fast Forward	Jessie Granger	Sidney Poitier		
1985	Sylvester	Muffy	Tim Hunter		
1991	Memories of Midnight	Sister Larissa	Gary Nelson	Television film	
1992	The Nutt House	Mrs. Henderson	Adam Rifkin		
1992	The Sands of Time	Sister Larissa	Gary Nelson	Television film	
1994	The Next Karate Kid	Louisa Pierce	Christopher Cain		
1995	Thunder in Paradise 3	Cavanna	Douglas Schwartz		
1997	The Relic	Mrs. Blaisedale	Peter Hyams		
1998	A Perfect Murder	Sandra Bradford	Andrew Davis		
2008	The Awakening of Spring	Mrs. Gable	Arthur Allan Seidelman		
2013	A Fuller Life	Herself	Samantha Fuller	Documentary	
2015	Aghápe	Mature Leean	Radick Cembrzynski	Short film	
2018	The Storyteller	Rosemary	Joe Crump		

=== Television ===
Year	Title	Role	Notes
1952	Tales of Tomorrow	Martha	Episode: "Seeing-Eye Surgeon"
1957	State Trooper	Doris Woodley	Episode: "Beef ala Murder"
1958	Mike Hammer	Jean Barr	Episode: "Overdose of Lead"
1957–1958	The Bob Cummings Show	Patricia Plumber	Episodes: "Bob Gives Psychology Lessons" and "Bob's Forgotten Fiancée"
1960	Adventures in Paradise	Laura Knight	Episode: "Sink or Swim"
1961	Zane Grey Theater	Beth Woodfield	Episode: "Knight of the Sun"
1964	The Outer Limits	Laura James	Episode: "The Duplicate Man"
1965	Bob Hope Presents the Chrysler Theatre	Louise Menke	Episode: "Exit from a Plane in Flight"
1961–1965	Perry Mason	Various roles	5 episodes
1971–1972	Love Is a Many Splendored Thing	Marian Hiller	Series regular
1975	Hawaii Five-O	Mrs. Thorncrest	Episode: "Death's Name Is Sam"
1977	Lanigan's Rabbi	Vinnie Barcas	Episode: "In Hot Weather, the Crime Rate Soars"
1979	The Rockford Files	IRS Agent Sally Sternhagen	Episode: "The Big Cheese"
1979	Fantasy Island	Shirley Forbush	Episode: "Hit Man/The Swimmer"
1981	Fantasy Island	Maggie Dunphy	Episode: "Perfect Husband, The/Volcano"
1982–1987	Capitol	Clarissa McCandless	Series regular
1986	On Wings of Eagles	Margot Perot	Miniseries
1987	Murder, She Wrote	Margaret Witworth	Episode: "Murder, She Spoke"
1988	The Loner	Kate Shane	Pilot
1987–1988	L.A. Law	Charlotte Kelsey	Episodes: "Rohner vs. Gradinger" and "Full Marital Jacket"
1989	MacGyver	Francine Leyland	Episode: "Ma Dalton"
1989	Midnight Caller	Teresa Chandler	Episode: "Blood Red"
1990	Designing Women	Louise Pollard	Episode: "The Mistress"
1991	Matlock	Alice Windemere	Episode: "The Suspect"
1992	Baywatch	Maggie James	Episode: "Sea of Flames"
1992	2000 Malibu Road	Camilla O'Keefe	Series regular, 6 episodes
1992	Civil Wars	Harriet Guilford	Episode: "Das Boat House"
1993	Star Trek: Deep Space Nine	Taxco	Episode: "The Forsaken"
1994	Frasier	Clarice Warner	Episode: "Slow Tango in South Seattle"
1994	Thunder in Paradise	Cavanna	Episodes: "Deadly Lessons: Part 1" and "Deadly Lessons: Part 2"
1994	Silk Stalkings	Karen Krane	Episode: "Ask the Dust"
1995	Caroline in the City	Barbara	Episode: "Caroline and the Folks"
1995	High Society	Boatie	Episode: "Tomb with a View"
1996	The Young and the Restless	Audrey North	Recurring role
1997	Sunset Beach	Madame Julianna Deschanel	Recurring role, 9 episodes
1997–2007, 2009–2017, 2019–2020, 2022	General Hospital	Helena Cassadine	Series regular (1997–2002), Recurring guest star (2003–2022); Nominated: Daytime Emmy Award for America's Favorite Villain (2002)
1998	Kelly Kelly	Kate	Episode: "The Kilt Show"
2000	Providence	Candice Whitman	Episode: "Syd in Wonderland"
2006	Criminal Minds	Deb Mason	Episode: "Riding the Lightning"
2007	The 4400	Audrey Parker	Episode: "Audrey Parker's Come and Gone"
2009	Cold Case	Caroline Kemp	Episode: "Libertyville"
2013	1600 Penn	Bunny Thoroughgood	Episode: "So You Don't Want to Dance"
2014	Men at Work	Mary	Episode: "Suburban Gibbs"
2016	11.22.63	Old Sadie Dunhill	Episode: "The Day in Question"
2022	9-1-1: Lone Star	Helen Strand	Episode: "Shift-Less"

== Stage credits ==
Year	Title	Role	Notes	Ref.
1960–1961	Guys and Dolls	Sarah Brown	Civic Light Opera Company, Los Angeles, California	
1962	Kismet	Lalume	U.S. touring production	
1964	Camelot	Guenevere	U.S. touring production	
1964	Kiss Me Kate	Lilli/Kate	U.S. touring production	
1965	110 in the Shade	Lizzie	Kansas City Starlight Production	
1965	Anya	Anya	Ziegfeld Theatre, New York City	
1966	Show Boat	Julie	New York State Theatre, New York City	
1966	Carousel	Julie Jordan	City Center Theater, New York City	
1967–1968	The Sound of Music	Maria Rainer	City Center Theater, New York City	
1967	Dumas and Son	Marie	Los Angeles Civic Light Opera	
1968	The King and I	Anna Leonowens	City Center Theatre, New York City	
1969	Cactus Flower	Stephanie	Pocono Playhouse, Mountainhome, PA	
1970	The Sound Of Music	Maria	Jones Beach Theater, Long Island	
1970	The Engagement Baby	Vivian Whitney	Helen Hayes Theatre, New York City	
1971	Ari	Kitty Fremont	Mark Hellinger Theatre, New York City	
1972	The King and I	Anna Leonowens	Jones Beach Theater, Long Island	
1972	I Do! I Do!	Agnes	Chateau de Ville, John Raitt Saugus, Massachusetts	
1973	I Do! I Do!	Agnes	Meadowbrook Dinner Theatre Van Johnson, Cedar Grove, New Jersey	
1973	The Sound of Music	Maria Rainer	Pittsburg CLO, Heinz Hall, Pittsburgh, PA	
1973	The King and I	Anna Leonowens	State Fair Music Hall, Dallas, Texas	
1973	My Fair Lady	Eliza Doolittle	Indianapolis	
1973	Mame	Mame	Springfield, Missouri	
1973	The Desperate Hours	Eleanor Hilliard	Arlington Park, Illinois	
1974	Oh Coward!		Westport Country Playhouse, Westport, Connecticut	
1974	Oklahoma	Laurie	Kansas City Starlight Production	
1974	I Do! I Do!	Agnes	Various with Theodore Bikel, Summer, National Tour	
1975	Rogers and Hart!		Westwood Playhouse, Los Angeles	
1976–1979	The King and I	Anna Leonowens	Uris Theatre,1976 Summer National Tour 07/26/1976 -10/03/1976. 05/02/1977 -12/30/78 New York City, 01/02/1979 -4/22/79 Chicago and Los Angeles	
1980	The Sound of Music	Maria Rainer	Jones Beach Theater, Long Island	
1987	42nd Street	Dorothy Brock	Heritage Forum, Anaheim	
1989	Steel Magnolias	M'Lynn	Royal George, Chicago	
1991	The Speed of Darkness	—N/a	Associate producer Belasco Theatre, New York City	
1995	Follies	Phyllis Stone	Theatre Under the Stars, Houston, Texas; 5th Avenue Theatre, Seattle, Washington	
1998	Something Wonderful		McCallum Theatre, Palm Desert, California	
2008	Six Dance Lessons in Six Weeks	Lilly Harrison	Falcon Theatre, Los Angeles	

== Sources ==
- Affron, Charles (2002). Lillian Gish: Her Legend, Her Life. Los Angeles: University of California Press. ISBN 978-0-520-23434-5.
- Hischak, Thomas (2008). The Oxford Companion to the American Musical. Oxford, Oxfordshire: Oxford University Press. ISBN 978-0-195-33533-0.
- Rodgers, Richard (2002). Musical Stages: An Autobiography. New York: DeCapo Press. ISBN 978-0-306-81134-0.
- Willis, John (1969). Theatre World. Vol. 26. New York: Crown Publishers. OCLC 185387642.
