= The Naked Kiss =

1964 film by Samuel Fuller

- Theatrical release poster
- Directed by: Samuel Fuller
- Written by: Samuel Fuller
- Produced by: Samuel Fuller
- Starring: Constance Towers; Anthony Eisley; Michael Dante; Virginia Grey; Patsy Kelly; Betty Bronson
- Cinematography: Stanley Cortez
- Edited by: Jerome Thoms
- Music by: Paul Dunlap
- Distributed by: Allied Artists Pictures Corporation
- Release date: October 29, 1964 (U.S.)
- Running time: 90 minutes
- Country: United States
- Language: English
- Budget: $200,000

The Naked Kiss is a 1964 American neo-noir melodrama film written and directed by Samuel Fuller and starring Constance Towers, Anthony Eisley, Michael Dante and Virginia Grey. It was Fuller's second film for Allied Artists after his 1963 film Shock Corridor.

== Plot ==
Kelly is a prostitute who arrives by bus in the small town of Grantville after being chased out of the big city by her former pimp. She engages in a quick tryst with local police captain Griff, who then commands her to leave town and refers her to a cathouse just across the state line that is operated by a madam named Candy.

Kelly instead abandons her illicit lifestyle, renting a room from a local seamstress and becoming a nurse at a hospital for disabled children. Griff, who does not trust reformed prostitutes, continues trying to force her from the town.

Kelly falls in love with J. L. Grant, the wealthy scion of the town's founding family, an urbane sophisticate and Griff's best friend. She tells Grant the truth about her past but it does not bother him, and they plan to marry.

After Kelly's young coworker Buff quits her job and is recruited to join Candy's stable of prostitutes, Kelly violently threatens Candy to keep away from Buff, forcing Buff's $25 cash advance into Candy's mouth.

Upon hearing of the engagement, Griff visits Kelly at the hospital and demands that she leave town, threatening to reveal her former occupation. However, after Kelly makes it clear to him that Grant already knows the truth, Griff relents and agrees to be the best man at the wedding.

Shortly before the wedding, Kelly makes a surprise visit to Grant's mansion, where she discovers him on the verge of molesting a young girl. Grant argues that Kelly belongs with him because they are both deviants and she will understand his sickness. Kelly is enraged and strikes Grant in the head with a phone receiver, killing him.

Jailed and under heavy interrogation, Kelly admits to killing Grant, but Griff does not believe her story and accuses her of having murdered Grant because he had threatened to break the engagement. Kelly tries to exonerate herself, but she cannot remember details about the girl whom she had seen at Grant's mansion. Candy and Buff are summoned to the jail, where Candy launches false accusations at Kelly and Buff denies having been paid by Candy.

By chance, Kelly sees the molested girl through the window and tries to coax the girl to tell what she knows about Grant. Although the girl initially resists, Griff advises Kelly about how to approach her, and the girl reveals the truth.

Kelly is released, but now notorious, she must leave town and boards the bus to her next destination.

== Cast ==
- Constance Towers as Kelly
- Anthony Eisley as Capt. Griff
- Michael Dante as J.L. Grant
- Virginia Grey as Candy
- Patsy Kelly as Mac, Head Nurse
- Marie Devereux as Buff
- Karen Conrad as Dusty
- Linda Francis as Rembrandt
- Bill Sampson as Jerry
- Jean-Michel Michenaud as Kip
- George Spell as Tim
- Christopher Barry as Peanuts
- Patty Robinson as Angel Face
- Edy Williams as Hatrack
- Betty Bronson as Miss Josephine, the Seamstress
- Neyle Morrow as Officer Sam

== Production ==
The title of Fuller's prior film Shock Corridor (1963), also starring Towers, appears on the marquee of a theater near the bus station. Kelly is also shown reading Fuller's pulp novel The Dark Page when she meets Griff.

== Reception ==
=== Critical response ===
Variety offered positive contemporary review: "Good Samuel Fuller programmer about a prostie trying the straight route, The Naked Kiss is primarily a vehicle for Constance Towers. Hooker angles and sex perversion plot windup are handled with care, alternating with handicapped children 'good works' theme ... Towers' overall effect is good, director Fuller overcoming his routine script in displaying blonde looker's acting range."

Critic Eugene Archer of The New York Times wrote that the film "has style to burn" and shows that Fuller is "one of the liveliest, most visual-minded and cinematically knowledgeable filmmakers now working in the low-budget Hollywood grist mill," but Archer denounced the plot as "patently absurd" and "sensational nonsense", calling the film a "wild little movie."

The film is listed in Golden Raspberry Award founder John Wilson's book The Official Razzie Movie Guide as one of the 100 Most Enjoyably Bad Movies Ever Made.

== Home media ==
A digitally restored version of the film was released on DVD and Blu-ray by The Criterion Collection. The release includes a new video interview with Constance Towers by filmmaker and historian Charles Dennis, excerpts from a 1983 episode of The South Bank Show dedicated to Fuller and two French television interviews with Fuller. The release includes a booklet featuring an essay by critic and poet Robert Polito and excerpts from Fuller's autobiography, A Third Face: My Tale of Writing, Fighting, and Filmmaking.

== See also ==
- List of American films of 1964
- List of cult films
