= Vatel =

Vatel may refer to:

- François Vatel (1631–1671), French chef and majordomo
- Françoise Vatel (1937–2005), French actress
- Vatel (film), a historical-drama film about François Vatel
- Vatel (hospitality management school), a hotel and tourism business school

== See also ==
- Emer de Vattel (1714–1767), Swiss philosopher, diplomat and legal expert
