= Victoria Shaw =

Victoria Shaw may refer to:

- Victoria Shaw (singer) (born 1962), American country music artist
- Victoria Shaw (actress) (1935–1988), Australian actress
