= Sound and Fury (1988 film) =

1988 French drama film

- Theatrical release poster
- French: De bruit et de fureur
- Directed by: Jean-Claude Brisseau
- Written by: Jean-Claude Brisseau
- Produced by: Margaret Ménégoz
- Starring: Bruno Cremer; François Négret; Vincent Gasperitsch; Fabienne Babe
- Cinematography: Romain Winding
- Edited by: Maria-Luisa Garcia; Jean-Claude Brisseau; Annick Hurst
- Production company: Les Films du Losange
- Distributed by: Les Films du Losange
- Release dates: May 1988 (Cannes); 1 June 1988 (France)
- Running time: 95 minutes
- Country: France
- Language: French

Sound and Fury (French: De bruit et de fureur) is a 1988 French drama film written and directed by Jean-Claude Brisseau. Inspired by Brisseau's own experience teaching at a school in Bagnolet at the time, the film depicts isolation and violence in the suburbs of Paris through the story of two teenagers spiraling into delinquency.

== Cast ==
- Bruno Cremer as Marcel
- Vincent Gasperitsch as Bruno
- François Négret as Jean-Roger
- Fabienne Babe as the teacher
- Lisa Hérédia as the phantom woman
- Fejria Deliba as Mina
- Antoine Fontaine as the principal
- Luc Ponette as the deputy head teacher
- Isabelle Hurtin as the social worker
- Thierry Helaine as Thierry
- Sandrine Arnault as Jean-Roger's sister
- Victoire Buff as Thierry's girlfriend
- Françoise Vatel as Jean-Roger's mother

== Production ==
In 1986, Brisseau's screenplay won the inaugural Prix du meilleur scénariste.

Filming took place in Bagnolet and the Cité des 4000 in La Courneuve, as well as in Aubervilliers.

== Release ==
The film had its world premiere in May 1988 at the 1988 Cannes Film Festival, where it was screened in the parallel section "Perspectives du cinéma français".

It was theatrically released on 1 June 1988.

It served as the opening film of 18th New Directors/New Films Festival at the Museum of Modern Art on 17 March 1989.

== Accolades ==
At the Cannes Film Festival, the film won the Prix Perspectives du cinéma français and the Prix spécial de la jeunesse.

For his performance in the film, François Négret received a nomination for Most Promising Actor at the 14th César Awards.

== Bibliography ==
- L'Avant-scène cinéma, No. 387, December 1989
- Cahiers du Cinéma, No. 398, July 1987
- Cahiers du Cinéma, No. 407/408, May 1988
- Cahiers du Cinéma, No. 409, June 1988
- Cinéma, No. 441, May 1988
- Cinéma, No. 459, September 1989
- Positif, No. 328, June 1988
- Première, No. 134, May 1988
- La Revue du cinéma, No. 439, June 1988
- Studio Magazine, No. 15, June 1988
