= Walk Like a Dragon =

1960 film by James Clavell

- Theatrical release poster
- Directed by: James Clavell
- Written by: James Clavell; Daniel Mainwaring
- Produced by: James Clavell
- Starring: Jack Lord; Nobu McCarthy; James Shigeta; Mel Tormé; Josephine Hutchinson; Rodolfo Acosta; Benson Fong
- Cinematography: Loyal Griggs
- Edited by: Howard A. Smith
- Music by: Paul Dunlap
- Production company: Paramount Pictures
- Distributed by: Paramount Pictures
- Release date: June 1, 1960
- Running time: 95 minutes
- Country: United States
- Language: English

Walk Like a Dragon is a 1960 American Western film directed by James Clavell, written by James Clavell and Daniel Mainwaring, and starring Jack Lord, Nobu McCarthy, James Shigeta, Mel Tormé, Josephine Hutchinson, Rodolfo Acosta and Benson Fong. It was released on June 1, 1960, by Paramount Pictures.

The film has a retroactive connection to Clavell's later Asian Saga novels; the 1981 novel Noble House features a character named Lincoln Bartlett who is said to be a descendant of the similarly named character played by Jack Lord in this movie.

== Plot ==
It is California during the 1870s. The cowboy Lincoln Bartlett, better known as 'Linc', comes to San Francisco and meets the Chinese Kim Sung at a slave fair, who is forced to work as a prostitute. To protect her from that environment, Linc decides to buy Kim for $750 in gold nuggets and let her live and work at his home. Linc's mother is not happy that a Chinese girl lives in their house and even less happy when Kim Sung and her son fall in love. Cheng Lu, a Chinese immigrant, is jealous and in order to take on Linc, he decides to take gunfighter lessons from 'The Deacon'.

Film's introduction:

California in the 1870s was rough and violent. Men were plentiful, but women were scarce. So girls were secretly and illegally imported from China, and sold as slaves. They were used, but scorned and isolated. This is a story of those times... It happened.

== Cast ==
- Jack Lord as Lincoln "Linc" Bartlett
- Nobu McCarthy as Kim Sung
- James Shigeta as Cheng Lu
- Mel Tormé as The Deacon
- Josephine Hutchinson as Ma Bartlett
- Rodolfo Acosta as Sheriff Marguelez
- Benson Fong as Wu
- Michael Pate as Reverend Will Allen
- Lilyan Chauvin as Mme. Lili Raide
- Don Kennedy as Masters
- Don "Red" Barry as Cabot
- Lester Matthews as Peter Mott
- Michael Ross as "Taffy"
- Charles Irwin as Angus
- Tom Kennedy as Jethro, The Bartender
- Tony Young as Cabot
- Natalie Trundy as Mrs. Susan Allen

== Reception ==
The film received mixed reviews by critics.
