= The Madonna and the Dragon =

- Directed by: Samuel Fuller
- Written by: Samuel Fuller
- Starring: Jennifer Beals; Luc Merenda; Patrick Bauchau
- Music by: Marc Hillman
- Release date: 1990
- Running time: 90 minutes
- Country: France
- Languages: English, Tagalog

The Madonna and the Dragon (also known as Tinikling ou 'La Madonne et le Dragon') is a 1990 television film written and directed by Samuel Fuller and starring Jennifer Beals.

It was Fuller's final film.

== Cast ==
- Jennifer Beals as Patty Meredith
- Luc Merenda as Simon LeTerre
- Patrick Bauchau as Pavel
- Behn Cervantes as Mindanao
- Pilar Pilapil as Mindanao's Girl
- Nanding Josef as Eduardo
- Christa Lang as Mama
- Samuel Fuller as Chef de Bureau Newsweek

== Overview ==
A female photojournalist covering the 1980s civil war in the Philippines photographs soldiers executing an innocent civilian. When word gets out about the photograph, newspapers want it on the front page, others want it for propaganda.
