= Françoise Vatel =

French actress

- Born: Françoise Watel; 28 November 1937; Clichy, Hauts-de-Seine, France
- Died: 24 October 2005 (aged 67); Soissons, France
- Occupation: Actress

Françoise Vatel (born Françoise Watel, 28 November 1937 – 24 October 2005) was a French actress.

Vatel was born in Clichy, Hauts-de-Seine. She began her film career at the age of 16 in Jean Gourguet's Les Premiers outrages, and she worked with the director again in Les promesses dangeureuses, La Putain sentimentale and Les frangines. She worked then in the theatre, playing for several years in Claude Magnier's Oscar. She appeared also in films of the Nouvelle Vague, in Luc Moullet's Brigitte et Brigitte and Les Contrebandières and Claude Chabrol's Les Cousins among others. She died in Soissons, aged 67.

== Selected filmography ==
=== Film ===
- 1955 : Les Premiers Outrages by Jean Gourguet : Brigitte Lambert, known as Bichette
- 1956 : Les Promesses dangereuses by Jean Gourguet : Marie-Titine
- 1958 : Un jour comme les autres by Paul Bordry
- 1958 : Quelqu'un frappe à la porte by Alexandre Szombati : Elisabeth
- 1958 : Young Sinners (Les Tricheurs) by Marcel Carné with Christian Azzopardi
- 1958 : La Putain sentimentale by Jean Gourguet with Maria Vincent
- 1959 : Les Cousins by Claude Chabrol : Martine with Gerard Blain
- 1959 : Bal de nuit by Maurice Cloche
- 1959 : Les Amants de demain by Marcel Blistène with Édith Piaf
- 1960 : Un steack trop cuit by Luc Moullet - short film
- 1960 : Les Frangines by Jean Gourguet : Nadine
- 1960 : Le Pain des Jules by Jacques Séverac : Zize
- 1961 : Terres noires by Luc Moullet - short film, narration only
- 1961 : Dans la gueule du loup by Jean-Charles Dudrumet, : Odette
- 1962 : Les Ballets roses (Dossier 1413) d'Alfred Rode : Caroline
- 1962 : Capito? by Luc Moullet - short film
- 1962 : La fille de Paname et le gars de Padoue by Luc Moullet - short film
- 1965 : How to Keep the Red Lamp Burning by Gilles Grangier : Une pensionnaire (segment "La Fermeture")
- 1966 : Brigitte et Brigitte by Luc Moullet : Brigitte
- 1967 : Les Contrebandières by Luc Moullet : Brigitte
- 1967 : Jeudi on chantera comme dimanche by Louis by Heusch : Francine
- 1972 : Le gang des otages by Edouard Molinaro
- 1976 : Mon cœur est rouge by Michèle Rosier : La charcutière
- 1978 : L'Exercice du pouvoir by Philippe Galland : Mimi
- 1985 : Une soirée perdue by Cécile Decugis
- 1986 : Les interdits du monde by Chantal Lasbats - documentary, narration only
- 1987 : La Comédie du travail by Luc Moullet : Une amie by Françoise
- 1988 : De bruit et de fureur by Jean-Claude Brisseau : Mère Jean-Roger
- 2002 : Les Naufragés by la D17 by Luc Moullet : la femme by la cabine
- 2005 : Horizon by Pascale Bodet

=== Television ===
- 1959 : La Nuit de Tom Brown (TV) : Daisy
- 1960 : Au fil by l'histoire (Les Cinq Dernières Minutes) (TV series) : Georgette
- 1961 : Epreuves à l'appui (Les Cinq Dernières Minutes, episode 21), by Claude Loursais : Janine
- 1962 : Quatre-vingt-treize by Alain Boudet, (TV)
- 1966 : Cécilia, médecin de campagne (TV series) : Marie-Rose
- 1966 : Les Cinq Dernières Minutes by Claude Loursais, episode Pigeon vole
- 1966 : Les Cinq Dernières Minutes by Jean-Pierre Marchand La Rose by fer
- 1967 : Au théâtre ce soir : Le Système Fabrizzi by Albert Husson, story Sacha Pitoëff, director Pierre Sabbagh, Théâtre Marigny
- 1969 : La Veuve rusée (by Carlo Goldoni), telefilm by Jean Bertho : Marinette
- 1972 : L'Image (TV) : Le script
- 1973 : L'Enfant de l'automne (feuilleton TV) : La fille
- 1974 : Entre toutes les femmes by Maurice Cazeneuve : Margot
- 1978 : Claudine en ménage by Édouard Molinaro
- 1980 : Papa Poule by Roger Kahane, (TV series) : L'employée by l'ANPE (1980)
- 1982 : Le sage de Sauvenat (TV)
- 1984 : Rue Carnot (TV series) : Suzanne
- 1989 : Je retourne chez maman (Intrigues) by Emmanuel Fonlladosa
