= Edge of Eternity (film) =

1959 film directed by Don Siegel

- Directed by: Donald Siegel
- Screenplay by: Knut Swenson; Richard Collins
- Story by: Ben Markson; Knut Swenson
- Produced by: Kendrick Sweet
- Starring: Cornel Wilde; Victoria Shaw; Mickey Shaughnessy
- Cinematography: Burnett Guffey
- Edited by: Jerome Thoms
- Music by: Daniele Amfitheatrof
- Production companies: Thunderbird Productions, Inc.
- Distributed by: Columbia Pictures
- Release date: November 2, 1959
- Running time: 80 minutes
- Country: United States
- Language: English

Edge of Eternity is a 1959 American crime film starring Cornel Wilde, Victoria Shaw, and Mickey Shaughnessy. Directed by Donald Siegel, it was shot in CinemaScope on location in the Grand Canyon.

== Plot ==
A man has parked his car and is looking into the Grand Canyon with binoculars when someone releases the car's parking brake and pushes the vehicle toward him. He is able to leap out of the way at the last moment, and in a fierce struggle knocks his attacker over the rim to his death.

The man is then seen wandering, disheveled and talking apparent nonsense, by Eli, an old prospector who tells deputy sheriff Martin about it. However, Eli has a reputation for telling tall tales, and the deputy ignores him and instead chases an attractive woman, Janice Kendon, driving recklessly down the road. Eli finds the man dead, hanging with his hands bound behind him.

The deputy and Janice team up to solve the murders. Janice provides a vital clue when she identifies the hanged man's suit jacket as being made by an exclusive New York City tailor. It develops that he is an Eastern executive of an Arizona mining company. Martin correctly assumes the man has made the cross-country trip to investigate possible theft from the company.

Meanwhile, Eli becomes the murderer's next victim, stabbed to death by someone he welcomes into his home as a friend.

Janice's brother Bob is a rich wastrel who spends most of his days at Scotty O'Brien's tavern, the sole local drinking spot. While Martin is at Janice's house, Bob receives a mysterious phone call and rushes out. A worried Janice follows him, and Martin follows Janice.

It turns out O’Brien has been illegally extracting gold from a closed mine, and expects Bob to fly him to Las Vegas in a private plane. When Bob discovers the murders, he refuses---and O'Brien kills Bob just as Janice drives up.

O'Brien takes Janice hostage in her car and shoots up Martin's patrol car. O'Brien thinks he is in the clear when he sees no cars following him, but helicopter patrols have kept him in sight.

Martin leaps aboard a cable car that travels over the deepest point in the Grand Canyon. He and O’Brien end up fighting outside the car. O'Brien falls to his death, and Martin rescues and comforts Janice.

== Cast ==
- Cornel Wilde as Deputy Les Martin
- Victoria Shaw as Janice Kendon
- Mickey Shaughnessy as Scotty O'Brien
- Edgar Buchanan as Sheriff Edwards
- Rian Garrick as Bob Kendon
- Jack Elam as Bill Ward
- Alexander Lockwood as Jim Kendon
- Dabbs Greer as Gas station attendant
- Tom Fadden as Eli
- Wendell Holmes as Sam Houghton
- Bernhard "Barney" Dehl as police officer (uncredited)
- Hope Summers as Motel Owner (uncredited)
- Guy Way as Charlie Piper (uncredited)

== Production ==
It was known as Rim of the Canyon. Felicia Farr was to play the female lead but was replaced by Victoria Shaw. Filming started 27 April 1959.

External image
- Fight scene in the US Guano cablecar

Filming took place in Kingman, Oatman, and Gold Road, Arizona. The climax of the film, involving a fight on a US Guano cable car suspended above the Grand Canyon, was filmed in the aerial tramway to the Bat Cave mine, in the western Grand Canyon of Arizona. US Guano owned and operated the Bat Cave Mine at the time. Guano is a good organic fertiliser commercially important before the use of modern synthetics. The mine played out in 1960 and was closed. The head house for the cable car and some of the relic equipment as seen in the film have been preserved and may be viewed today, almost as it was in the film.
