= The Dark Page =

1944 book by Samuel Fuller

- First edition
- Author: Samuel Fuller
- Language: English
- Published: 1944 Duell, Sloan and Pearce
- Publication place: U.S.

The Dark Page is a 1944 novel by Samuel Fuller, who later went on to become a film director and helm the likes of I Shot Jesse James and the film noir The Naked Kiss.

It was written while Fuller was an infantryman in the army in WWII and was filmed as Scandal Sheet (1952).

The book was reprinted under the title Murder Makes a Deadline by Lawrence Spivak in 1951 and again under its original title by Avon in 1982.
