= Brigitte et Brigitte =

- Directed by: Luc Moullet
- Written by: Luc Moullet
- Starring: Colette Descombes; Françoise Vatel; Claude Melki; Michel Gonzalès
- Cinematography: Claude Creton
- Release date: 17 December 1966
- Running time: 75 minutes
- Country: France
- Language: French

Brigitte et Brigitte is a 1966 French feature-length film written and directed by Cahiers du cinéma film critic Luc Moullet as his debut film.

== Plot ==
Brigitte and Brigitte arrive in Paris to begin their first year of university, studying phonetics and cinema at Nanterres. They come from different provincial towns and meet on a train station bench. The fashion of their time has shaped them in the same image. They become friends and share the same apartment.

== Cast ==
- Françoise Vatel : Brigitte
- Colette Descombes : Brigitte
- Claude Melki : Léon
- Claude Chabrol : the cousin
- Samuel Fuller : himself
- Éric Rohmer : Professor Schérer
- Michel Gonzalès : Jacques
- Luc Moullet : the road mender and the man who buys newspapers
- Michel Delahaye : the supervisor
- Pierre-Richard Bré : a cinephile
- André Téchiné : a cinephile
- Paul Martin : a student
- Dominique Rabourdin : a spectator sleeping at a showing of L'Avventura
- Jacques Bontemps : a spectator sleeping at a showing of L'Avventura
- Joël Monteilhet : Workman

== Reception ==
Brigitte et Brigitte was praised by Jean-Luc Godard as being a "revolutionary film."
