= Essai d'ouverture =

Essai d'ouverture is a 1988 French 15-minute-long film by Luc Moullet. It's about one narrator and his attempts at opening a Coca-Cola bottle.

== See also ==
- Luc Moullet
- French new wave
