= Philippe Théaudière =

French cinematographer

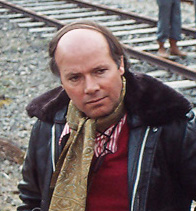
Philippe Théaudière in 1981

Philippe Théaudière (sometimes credited as Phillipe Theodiere; 1942 – 28 December 2016) was a French cinematographer most famous for his work on European exploitation films during the 1970s, working on such seminal "Euro sleaze" films as Seven Women for Satan (1976). Early in his career, he also photographed films for French New Wave-associated directors such as Jean Eustache and Luc Moullet.

Théaudière died on 28 December 2016.
