= Scandal Sheet (1952 film) =

1952 film by Phil Karlson

- Theatrical release poster
- Directed by: Phil Karlson
- Screenplay by: Eugene Ling; James Poe; Ted Sherdeman
- Based on: The Dark Page by Samuel Fuller
- Produced by: Edward Small
- Starring: Broderick Crawford; Donna Reed; John Derek; Rosemary DeCamp; Henry O'Neill; Harry Morgan
- Cinematography: Burnett Guffey
- Edited by: Jerome Thoms
- Music by: George Duning
- Color process: Black and white
- Production company: Motion Picture Investors
- Distributed by: Columbia Pictures
- Release date: January 16, 1952 (New York City)
- Running time: 82 minutes
- Country: United States
- Language: English

Scandal Sheet is a 1952 American film noir directed by Phil Karlson. The film is based on the 1944 novel The Dark Page by Samuel Fuller, who himself was a newspaper reporter before his career in film. The drama features Broderick Crawford, Donna Reed and John Derek.

== Plot ==
Mark Chapman, editor of the New York Express, has made the newspaper a success by pursuing sensationalism and yellow journalism. His protégé is ace reporter Steve McCleary, while successful feature writer Julie Allison is frustrated by the paper's drift towards muckraking. One night, during a lonely hearts dance organized by the Express, Chapman's estranged wife, Charlotte Grant, who is coincidentally at the dance, see him. She confronts him and demands that he visit her hotel room. It is revealed that Chapman's real name is George Grant, and he abandoned his wife decades earlier, changing his identity. Chapman treats her with utter contempt, and has no sympathy at all for her heartache and attempted suicide when he abandoned her. He becomes increasingly more offensive and cruel towards her, and she eventually slaps him, which he responds to by hitting her hard enough to knock her down. Charlotte then threatens to publicize his real identity. Chapman tries to restrain her and violently hits her again, knocking her against a pipe; she strikes her head and dies. Chapman acts immediately to pose the scene to look like an accident, taking her wedding ring, and the Lonely Hearts badge from her dress.

The police initially believe she slipped in the bathtub, but McCleary begins covering the case, and his reporting reveals it was a murder. McCleary is eager to run the story, and Chapman must acquiesce to avoid suspicion. The "mystery" murderer is dubbed the "Lonely Hearts Killer." Charlie Barnes, an alcoholic former star reporter and Pulitzer Prize winner, stumbles upon Charlotte's suitcase, in which he finds wedding photographs showing Chapman (then Grant) and his wife. He realizes that Chapman must be the killer. Barnes contacts Allison, who has been kind to him, attempting to give her the scoop, but Chapman overhears the conversation. He intercepts and kills Barnes before he can reveal the truth to a rival publication. This act only increases public interest in the story of the Lonely Hearts Killer, much to Chapman's frustration.

Assisted by Allison, McCleary continues to track down clues and leads. Eventually he locates another photo from Chapman/Grant's wedding, although the groom is shot in profile and it is not obvious that it is Chapman. McCleary and Allison travel to Connecticut to find the judge who married Charlotte and the man in the photograph. After a week of searching, they identify the judge who conducted the marriage. They bring Judge Elroy Hacker back to the newspaper building, where he identifies Chapman as the groom and thus the Lonely Hearts Killer. McCleary is incredulous, but Allison puts the pieces together and the desperate Chapman pulls a gun on them. The police arrive, and Chapman cannot bring himself to shoot McCleary. Instead, he gives McCleary his blessing to publish all details of his crimes and then commits suicide by cop.

== Cast ==
- Broderick Crawford as Mark Chapman/George Grant
- Donna Reed as Julie Allison
- John Derek as Steve McCleary
- Rosemary DeCamp as Charlotte Grant
- Henry O'Neill as Charlie Barnes
- Harry Morgan as Biddle (billed as Henry Morgan)
- James Millican as Lt. Davis
- Griff Barnett as Judge Elroy Hacker
- Jonathan Hale as Frank Madison
- Jay Adler as Bailey

== Production ==
Film rights to Sam Fuller's novel The Dark Page were sold for $15,000 to Howard Hawks during World War II. After the war, Fuller did a treatment and Sidney Buchman wrote a script, which Hawks then sold to Edward Small for $100,000. John Payne was originally offered the lead, then Dennis O'Keefe and Orson Welles were announced as stars, but none would eventually end up in the film.

== Reception ==
The New York Times film critic Bosley Crowther was lukewarm about the film, writing, "The ruthlessness of tabloid journalism, as seen through the coolly searching eyes of Hollywood scriptwriters (who naturally shudder with shock at such a thing), is given another demonstration in Columbia's Scandal Sheet, a run-of-the-press melodrama which came to the Paramount yesterday. But apart from a bit of tough discussion of the public's avid taste for thrills and chills and a few dubious hints at tabloid techniques, there is nothing very shocking in this film ... The moral of all this dismal nonsense, we would gather, is meant to be that corruption breeds corruption. The moral is okay. Enough said."

In 2005 critic Dennis Schwartz called the drama a "hard-hitting film noir thriller" and liked the camera work. He wrote, "Burnett Guffey's splashy black-and-white photography is filled with New York City atmosphere and the whirlwind energy buzzing around a press room."

Filmink called it "a tight little noir; Fuller would have made a better version, but this one still holds the attention."

== Preservation ==
The Academy Film Archive preserved Scandal Sheet in 1997.
