= I Aim at the Stars =

1960 film by J. Lee Thompson

I Aim at the Stars: the Werner von Braun story
- US Style B poster
- Directed by: J. Lee Thompson
- Written by: Jay Dratler (screenplay); George Froeschel (story); H. W. John (story); Udo Wolter (story)
- Produced by: Charles H. Schneer
- Starring: Curt Jürgens; Victoria Shaw; Herbert Lom; Gia Scala
- Cinematography: Wilkie Cooper
- Edited by: Frederick Wilson
- Music by: Laurie Johnson
- Production companies: Morningside Productions; Fama-Film
- Distributed by: Columbia Pictures
- Release date: 19 August 1960 (München)
- Running time: 106 minutes
- Countries: West Germany; United States
- Languages: German; English
- Budget: £500,000

I Aim at the Stars: the Werner von Braun story is a 1960 West German-American biographical film which tells the story of German rocket designer Wernher von Braun. The film covers his youthful rocket experiments in Germany, his V-2 rocket development efforts at Peenemünde during World War II, his postwar missile work with the U.S. Army, and the launch of Explorer 1, America's first satellite.

The film stars Curt Jürgens, Victoria Shaw, Herbert Lom, Gia Scala, and James Daly, and was written by Jay Dratler based on a story by George Froeschel, H. W. John, and Udo Wolter. It was directed by J. Lee Thompson.

It was shot at the Bavaria Studios in Munich, with sets designed by the art director Hans Berthel.

The film premiered in Munich on 19 August 1960; it subsequently opened in New York City and Los Angeles on 19 October and London on 24 November. In Germany the film was titled Ich greife nach den Sternen ("I Reach for the Stars"). In Italy the film was released as Alla Conquista dell' Infinito.

== Plot ==
The film portrays von Braun's progression from boyhood, through his missile work in Nazi Germany, to his later missile development for the U.S. Army, ending with the first successful launch of an American space satellite.

It begins in the early 1920s with a juvenile von Braun wrecking a neighbour's greenhouse with a wayward rocket launch, prefiguring his future wartime destruction. A policeman complains to Wernher's parents and his father offers to pay for the damage. Von Braun is next seen as a young engineer in the early 1930s intrigued by the possibility of space travel at the Space Rocket Society where he performs an experimental rocket engine static test. In the background, Captain Walter Dornberger talks to rocket pioneer Hermann Oberth about von Braun and suggests to rocketeer Anton Reger that the army could provide necessary equipment and facilities for such costly rocket experiments and development.

Despite his moral quandaries, von Braun participates in the Nazi's V-2 rocket program during World War II to further his ambitions in rocket engineering. The film carefully depicts his efforts to reconcile his love for scientific exploration with the knowledge that his work is being used for destructive purposes. Upon Germany's defeat, von Braun and his team surrender to American forces and are taken to the United States as part of Operation Paperclip.

The film recounts his efforts at the White Sands Proving Ground in New Mexico and at the Redstone Arsenal in Huntsville, Alabama developing missiles for the U.S. Army. The story concludes with von Braun's contributions to launching the first American orbital satellite, Explorer 1, in January 1958, four months after his painful disappointment at the earlier pioneering Sputnik satellite launch by the Soviet Union.

I Aim at the Stars wrestles with the ethical complexities of scientific progress and the personal life of von Braun. It highlights the disquieting paradox of a man who aimed for the stars but whose inventions caused immense destruction on Earth. The film is entirely silent about the brutal use of concentration camp slave labour and the harsh conditions which killed thousands of workers during the production of von Braun's missiles during the war.

== Cast ==
- Curt Jürgens as Wernher von Braun
- Victoria Shaw as Maria von Braun
- Herbert Lom as Anton Reger
- Gia Scala as Elizabeth Beyer
- James Daly as U.S. Major William Taggert
- Adrian Hoven as Mischke
- Gerard Heinz as Professor Oberth
- Karel Stepanek as Captain Dornberger
- Peter Capell as Dr. Neumann
- Hayden Rorke as U.S. Army Major
- Austin Willis as U.S. General John B. Medaris
- Alan Gifford as U.S. Army Colonel
- Helmo Kindermann as General Kulp
- Lea Seidl as Baroness von Braun
- John Crawford as Dr. Bosco - White Sands, New Mexico

== Production ==
Filming started in Munich in October 1959.

== Controversy ==
Director Lee Thompson said shortly before filming that "Many Britons feel Von Braun should have stood trial as a war criminal and no sooner did I sign to direct the biopic when a sizable section of the press advised: 'This motion picture should not be made.'" He added that "The U.S. ... didn't hesitate a moment when Von Braun surrendered. They put him to work. Can rejection of a great brain be justified? Current examples of this dilemma are not wanting. And though I oppose rejection, in 'Stars' we will let the public decide for itself."

The film's release was delayed in Britain due to controversy over what was considered an overly-sympathetic depiction of Von Braun. Thompson argued the film "doesn't whitewash Van Braun" saying "we set out to present an honest study of a man's mind and life and that's what we have done. He's neither a hero nor a villain, neither all black or all white. He's simply a man of our times. To me the real villains are power politicians." Thompson said von Braun "wasn't entirely pleased" about the movie and did not know why the scientist let them make the movie. Thompson said he and von Braun "disliked each other on sight. And though I came to admire certain qualities in him – his dedication, for example – I can't help wondering what some of these scientists have in place of a heart."

According to Von Braun biographer Michael J. Neufeld, although Von Braun later refused to take any responsibility for how the film turned out, claiming he was a captive of Hollywood, "he in fact wrote two multi-page commentaries that, for all their suggested changes, explicitly approved or silently accepted both the fictional elements and the unconscious falsification that arose from the screenwriters' attempts to turn his quasi-official biography into a dramatic film".

Satirist Mort Sahl suggested that the film should have the subtitle "but sometimes I hit London". The joke outlasted the film in the public consciousness.

== Adaptation ==
Dell published a comic book adaptation of the film with art by Jack Sparling as Four Color #1148 (October 1960).

== See also ==
- List of German films of the 1960s
- List of American films of 1960
