= The Crimson Kimono =

- Theatrical release poster
- Directed by: Samuel Fuller
- Screenplay by: Samuel Fuller
- Produced by: Samuel Fuller
- Starring: Victoria Shaw; Glenn Corbett; James Shigeta
- Cinematography: Sam Leavitt
- Edited by: Jerome Thoms
- Music by: Harry Sukman
- Production company: Globe Enterprises
- Distributed by: Columbia Pictures
- Release date: October 21, 1959
- Running time: 82 minutes
- Country: United States
- Language: English

The Crimson Kimono is a 1959 American crime film noir drama starring James Shigeta, Glenn Corbett and Victoria Shaw. Directed by Samuel Fuller, it features several ahead-of-its-time ideas about race and society's perception of race, a thematic and stylistic trademark of Fuller.

== Plot ==
Sugar Torch, a stripper who headlines a show in the Little Tokyo district of Los Angeles, is returning backstage after her act when she is ambushed in her dressing room by an assailant with a gun. She flees and runs out onto the street in a state of undress before succumbing to a mortal gunshot wound. Police detectives Joe Kojaku and Charlie Bancroft, partners and bachelors who share an apartment, are assigned to the case. They find a portrait in the dressing room of Sugar dressed in a kimono as a geisha, apparently preparing a Japanese-themed act.

Joe and Charlie lead the police search for the man who had been helping Sugar develop her act. They interview student artist Christine Downes, better known as Chris, who draws a sketch of the man for them. With her aid, they track down Hansel, the man who did the portrait of Sugar, and a wigmaker, Roma, who was to provide the wig for the stage act. Charlie begins to develop a romantic attraction to Chris.

Joe worries for Christine's safety, fearing that her sketch of the suspect being broadcast on television could result in the killer also targeting her. When his suspicions prove correct and an attempt is made on Chris's life at the dormitory where she lives, Joe and Charlie bring her to stay in their apartment for her safety. Joe, too, begins to fall for Christine, and she returns his feelings. However, Joe is tormented by the conflict between his deep friendship with Charlie and his feelings for the girl he knows Charlie to be in love with. When Joe aggressively attacks Charlie during a kendo competition, following a frank conversation about Chris, Charlie's facial reaction makes Joe believe that he resents the interracial nature of the relationship. Joe decides to quit the force, disillusioned after having felt for so long that his partner was free of this kind of racial bias. Charlie confronts Joe, telling him that the look he saw on his face was a flash of hatred rooted in the envy and betrayal he felt over Chris's love for Joe, and not born of racism, but Joe doesn't believe him.

Though Joe and Charlie had assumed Hansel to be the one who shot Sugar and attacked Chris, the culprit turns out to be Roma, who considered Sugar a threat to her relationship with Hansel because she misinterpreted a look on his face while he was watching Sugar's burlesque show. Joe relates this to Charlie and realizes that just as Roma saw what she wanted to in Hansel's face, Joe projected his own struggles with racism onto Charlie. After Roma's arrest, Joe asks Charlie if they can still be partners. He replies with a no, citing his irreconcilable feelings about Joe and Chris's relationship, but adding that he is, nevertheless, glad that Joe has "wrapped up his own case". Chris arrives, and she and Joe kiss in the middle of a Little Tokyo parade.

== Cast ==
- James Shigeta as Detective Joe Kojaku
- Glenn Corbett as Detective Sgt. Charlie Bancroft
- Victoria Shaw as Christine Downes
- Anna Lee as Mac
- Paul Dubov as Casale
- Jaclynne Greene as Roma
- Neyle Morrow as Hansel
- Gloria Pall as Sugar Torch
- Pat Silver as Mother (as Barbara Hayden)
- George Yoshinaga as Willy Hidaka
- Kaye Elhardt as Nun

== Production ==
Fuller was acquainted with a Nisei that worked for the LAPD as a detective, who became the basis of the Joe character. Columbia Studios head of production Sam Briskin went with the pitch for the film even after trying to get Fuller to make the "white guy a sonofabitch", which Fuller firmly disagreed with when it came to making a love story. The film was shot in Little Tokyo, Los Angeles in the winter of 1959.

== Preservation ==
The Academy Film Archive preserved The Crimson Kimono in 1998.

== Reception ==
Variety magazine gave a lukewarm at best review of the film at the time of its release: "The mystery melodrama part of the film gets lost during the complicated romance, and the racial tolerance plea is cheapened by its inclusion in a film of otherwise straight action...The three principals bring credibility to their roles, not too easy during moments when belief is stretched considerably. Anna Lee, Paul Dubov, Jaclynne Green and Neyle Morrow are prominent in the supporting cast."

In 1994, Gina Marchetti argued in Romance and the "Yellow Peril" that the film portrays racism as only existing "in the deluded minds of its victim." In 1997, The BFI Companion to Crime described the film as "One of Fuller's most striking melodramas".

In 2006 Ed Gonzales of Slant Magazine liked the film and wrote, "The opening is a triumph of grungy lyricism achieved through snaky cutting and blunt compositions: Sugar Torch (Gloria Pall), a stripper, is shot to death in the middle of a Los Angeles street after witnessing a murder inside her dressing room. The tenor of the film oscillates between tight-fisted noir and chamber drama, but the theme is always the same: cultural and romantic unrest. ... Fuller's feat is giving the film's nonstop interrogations, meetings and confrontations profound racial and political meaning."

In 2007 Philip W. Chung of Asian Week wrote that the white woman choosing an Asian man as a romantic partner is "What was most revolutionary about the film in 1959 Hollywood", something that was, "sadly, still revolutionary today."

The critics of Time Out magazine wrote of "Fuller developing his theme of urban alienation: landscape, culture and sexual confusion are all juxtaposed, forcing the Japanese-born detective (who, along with his buddy, is on the hunt for a burlesque queen murderer) into a nightmare of isolation and jealousy. Some fine set pieces - like the disciplined Kendo fight that degenerates into sadistic anarchy - and thoughtful camera-work serve to illustrate Fuller's gift for weaving a poetic nihilism out of his journalistic vision of urban crime."

In 2016 Robert Miklitsch wrote that the film's interracial relationships are compared to paintings using two different colors, a trope.

On the review aggregator website Rotten Tomatoes, 80% of 15 critics' reviews are positive.

== See also ==
- List of American films of 1959
