= Le Révélateur =

La Révélateur
- Directed by: Philippe Garrel
- Written by: Philippe Garrel
- Produced by: Philippe Garrel
- Starring: Laurent Terzieff; Bernadette Lafont; Stanislas Robiolles
- Cinematography: Michel Fournier
- Edited by: Philippe Garrel
- Production company: Zanzibar Films
- Release date: 1968
- Running time: 67 minutes
- Country: France

Le Révélateur is a 1968 experimental narrative film by Philippe Garrel.

== Synopsis ==
The film follows a 4-year-old boy (Stanislas Robiolles) and his parents (Laurent Terzieff and Bernadette Lafont). Cinematographer Michel Fournier, a then-frequent collaborator of Garrel, considers this their best work together.

== Cast ==
- Stanislas Robiolles as The Child
- Laurent Terzieff as The Father
- Bernadette Lafont as The Mother

== Production ==
Le Révélateur was photographed in Munich. The film is intentionally silent, and it is rumored that it is intended to be projected at 18 frames per second, the traditional speed for silent films. Michel Fournier worked as the cinematographer on the film.
