= Anatomie d'un rapport =

- Directed by: Luc Moullet; Antonietta Pizzorno
- Release date: 1976
- Country: France

Anatomie d'un rapport (English title: Anatomy of a Relationship; German title: Anatomie einer Beziehung), is a 1976 French film directed by Luc Moullet and Antonietta Pizzorno. The director plays himself in a docudrama fashion, an actress (Christine Hébert) plays his wife and his real-life partner, Antonietta Pizzorno, co-directs and handles the camera. Unlike more conventional drama centered narrative film, Anatomie d'un Rapport presents itself as a diary.

== Plot ==
A woman's feminist awakening drives an intellectual couple to a relationship crisis.

== Cast ==
- Luc Moullet
- Christine Hébert
- Viviane Berthommier
- Antonietta Pizzorno
