= Victoria Shaw (actress) =

Australian actress (1935–1988)

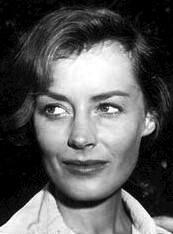
- Shaw in 1962
- Born: Jeanette Ann Lavina Mary Elizabeth Elphick; 25 May 1935; Sydney, New South Wales, Australia
- Died: 17 August 1988 (aged 53); Sydney, New South Wales, Australia
- Occupation: Actress
- Years active: 1953–1978
- Spouses: Roger Smith (m. 1956; div. 1965) Elliott Alexander (m. 1966; div. 1969)
- Children: 3

Victoria Shaw (25 May 1935 – 17 August 1988) was an Australian film and television actress.

== Early years ==
Shaw was born Jeanette Ann Lavina Mary Elizabeth Elphick in Sydney, New South Wales, Australia. Her parents were Captain and Mrs. Francis W. Elphick. She lived in Croydon, New South Wales, and attended a convent school.

== Career ==
Shaw worked in an insurance office for six months before she went to the Dally-Watkins Agency, where she studied modelling with June Dally-Watkins before first making the news when voted Australian model of the year in 1951 at the Sydney Artists' Ball She went on to make her Australian screen debut opposite Chips Rafferty in The Phantom Stockman (1953). Although inexperienced and her voice was dubbed, she appeared opposite experienced radio and film actors.

Bob Hope spotted her while touring Australia and urged her to try her luck in Hollywood, where in 1955 she signed a contract with Columbia Pictures.

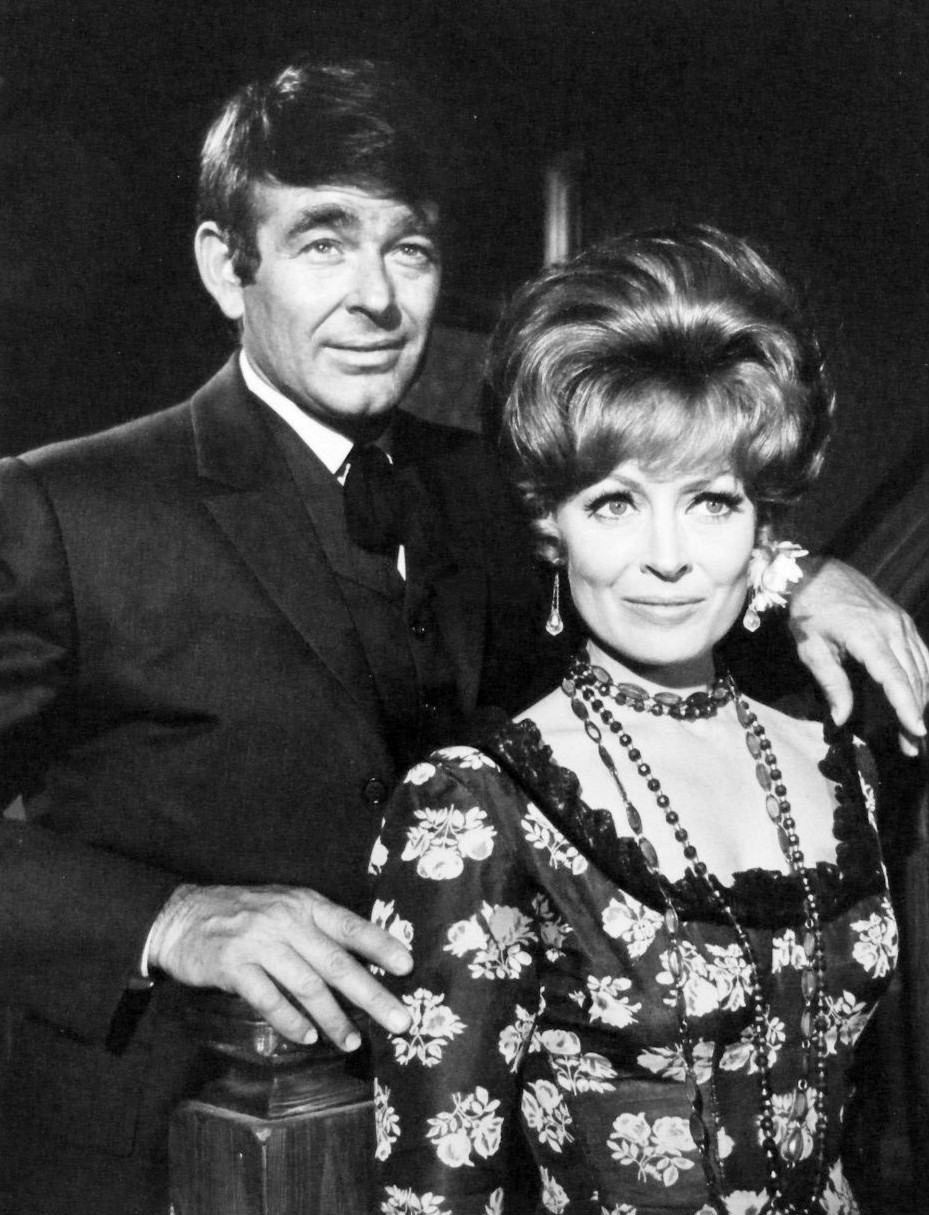
With Stuart Whitman in Cimarron Strip, 1968, in an episode written by Harlan Ellison

She played opposite Tyrone Power in The Eddy Duchin Story (1956), her United States film debut. Her subsequent films included The Crimson Kimono and Edge of Eternity (both 1959), Because They're Young and I Aim at the Stars (both 1960), Alvarez Kelly (1966), and Westworld (1973). She also made appearances in TV shows, including 77 Sunset Strip (1962), The Man from U.N.C.L.E. (1964), 12 O-Clock High (two episodes: 1964 and 1966), Cimarron Strip (1968), The F.B.I. (two episodes: both 1968), Ironside (1969), Barnaby Jones (1973), General Hospital (1974), McCloud (1976), and Charlie's Angels (1978).

== Personal life ==
Shaw married actor Roger Smith in North Hollywood, California, on July 28, 1956. After their divorce in 1965, Smith had joint custody of their three children, Tracey Leone (born 1957), Jordan F. (born 1958), and Dallas E. (born 1961). She married producer Elliott Alexander in 1966. They also divorced.

== Death ==
On August 17, 1988, Shaw died in Hornsby Hospital in Sydney at the age of 53 from emphysema.

== Recognition ==
Shaw was named Australia's Model of the Year in 1951. The next year, she was named Photographer's Model of the Year.

== Filmography ==
| Year | Title | Role | Notes |
|---|---|---|---|
| 1953 | The Phantom Stockman | Kim Marsden | |
| 1956 | The Eddy Duchin Story | Chiquita Wynn | |
| 1959 | The Crimson Kimono | Christine Downs | |
| 1959 | Edge of Eternity | Janice Kendon | |
| 1960 | Because They're Young | Joan Dietrich | |
| 1960 | I Aim at the Stars | Maria von Braun | |
| 1966 | Alvarez Kelly | Charity Warwick | |
| 1973 | Westworld | Medieval Queen | |
