= Shock Corridor =

1963 film by Samuel Fuller

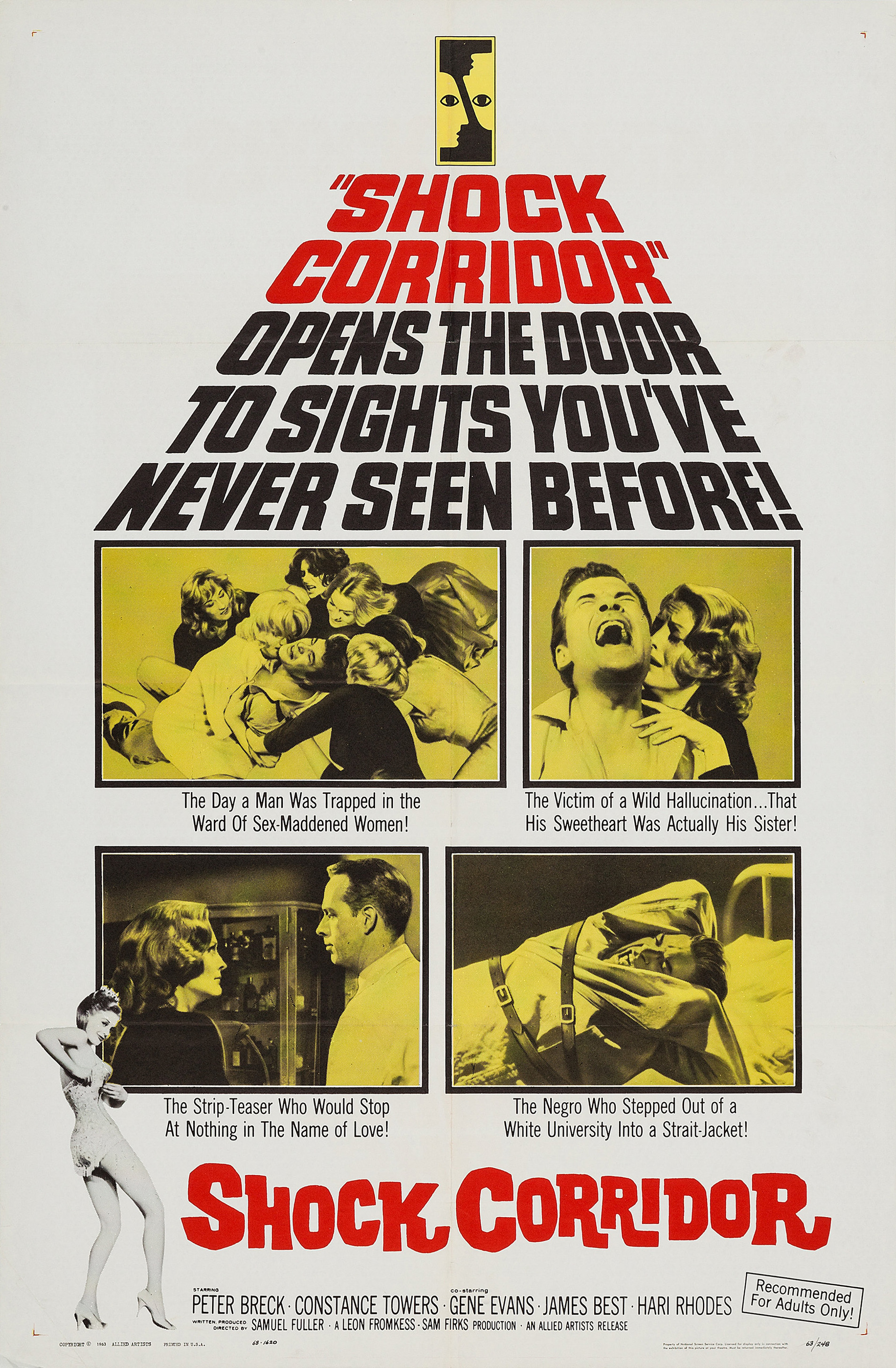
- Theatrical release poster
- Directed by: Samuel Fuller
- Written by: Samuel Fuller
- Produced by: Samuel Fuller
- Starring: Peter Breck; Constance Towers; Gene Evans; James Best
- Cinematography: Stanley Cortez
- Edited by: Jerome Thoms
- Music by: Paul Dunlap
- Production company: Allied Artists Pictures
- Distributed by: Allied Artists Pictures
- Release date: September 11, 1963
- Running time: 101 minutes
- Country: United States
- Language: English

Shock Corridor is a 1963 American psychological thriller film starring Peter Breck, Constance Towers, and Gene Evans. Written, directed and produced by Samuel Fuller, it tells the story of a journalist who gets himself intentionally committed to a mental hospital to solve a murder committed within the institution.

In 1996, Shock Corridor was selected for preservation in the United States National Film Registry by the Library of Congress as being "culturally, historically, or aesthetically significant".

== Plot ==
Bent on winning a Pulitzer Prize, ambitious journalist Johnny Barrett hopes to uncover the facts behind the unsolved murder of Sloan, an inmate at a psychiatric hospital. He convinces an expert psychiatrist, Dr. Fong, to coach him to appear insane when it involves relating imaginary accounts of incest with his "sister", who is impersonated by his exotic-dancer girlfriend, Cathy; though against her wishes, she is talked into assisting him by filing a police complaint, and his performance during the investigation convinces the authorities to incarcerate him in the institution where the murder took place. Johnny is quickly disturbed by the behavior of his fellow inmates, and on one occasion is mauled by a group of female nymphomaniacs who assault him in their ward.

Johnny learns the murder had three witnesses, each driven insane by a particular stress (each witness represents one of the obsessions of Americans at that time; war, racism, fear of nuclear annihilation) but capable of occasional, brief periods of sanity. The first witness, Stuart, is the son of a Southern sharecropper who was taught bigotry and hatred as a child. He was captured in the Korean War and was brainwashed into becoming a Communist. Stuart was ordered to indoctrinate a fellow prisoner, but instead the prisoner's unwavering patriotism reformed him. Stuart's captors pronounced him insane and he was returned to the United States in a prisoner exchange, after which he received a dishonorable discharge and was publicly reviled as a traitor. Stuart now imagines himself to be Confederate States of America General J.E.B. Stuart. Through conversation with Stuart, Johnny discerns that the killer was likely a hospital staff member, as Stuart recalled the assailant was dressed in white.

The second witness to Sloan's murder, Trent, was one of the first black students to integrate a segregated Southern university. Psychologically traumatized by the abuses he suffered there, he now imagines himself a member of the Ku Klux Klan, and stirs up the patients with white nationalist dogma. The third and final witness is Boden, an atomic scientist scarred by the knowledge of the devastating power of intercontinental ballistic missiles. He has regressed to the mentality of a six-year-old child.

After a hospital riot, Johnny is straitjacketed and subjected to shock treatment, and comes to believe Cathy is truly his sister, rejecting her when she visits. He experiences many other symptoms of mental breakdown while he learns the identity of the killer - Wilkes, a hospital attendant who committed the murder to cover up his sexual liaisons with numerous female patients. Johnny confronts Wilkes in the hydrotherapy room, and begins a violent altercation with him, eventually extracting a confession in front of witnesses.

Wilkes is apprehended, and Johnny is finally able to write his story on Sloan's murder, but the ordeal leaves him with a shattered psyche, and he is diagnosed with schizophrenia. Some time later, Cathy visits Johnny in the hospital. She laments to a psychologist about Johnny's mental decline, as Johnny sits idly in a catatonic state.

== Cast ==
- Peter Breck as Johnny Barrett
- Constance Towers as Cathy
- Gene Evans as Boden
- James Best as Stuart
- Hari Rhodes as Trent
- Larry Tucker as Pagliacci
- Paul Dubov as Dr. Menkin
- Chuck Roberson as Wilkes
- Bill Zuckert as Swanson
- Philip Ahn as Dr. Fong

== Production ==
Fuller originally wrote the film under the title Straitjacket for Fritz Lang in the late 1940s, but Lang wanted to change the lead character to a woman, so Joan Bennett could play the role.

The film was shot on a ten-day shooting schedule with scarce resources.

Constance Towers was asked by Fuller to be in the film during dinner at Fuller's house.

== Release ==
It has been released by the Criterion Collection on different formats, starting with LaserDisc.

=== Reception ===
On Rotten Tomatoes, the film holds an approval rating of 94% based on 17 reviews, with a weighted average rating of 7.86/10. Author and film critic Leonard Maltin awarded the film three out of a possible four stars, calling it a "[p]owerful melodrama with raw, emotional impact." Andrew Sarris praised the film as "...an allegory of America today, not so much surreal as subreal in its hallucinatory view of history which can only be perceived beneath a littered surface of plot intrigue... a distinguished addition to that art form in which Hollywood has always excelled: the Baroque B-picture."

In 1996, Shock Corridor was selected for preservation in the United States National Film Registry by the Library of Congress as being "culturally, historically, or aesthetically significant".

Martin Scorsese's 2010 film Shutter Island is said to be influenced by this film.

== Novelization ==
Concurrent with the release of the film in 1963, Belmont Books released a novelization of the screenplay, written by one of the era's most popular and distinctive paperback pulpsmiths, Michael Avallone. Fuller wanted to stop Avallone's book for plagiarism, but both writers were credited when it was released.

== Legacy ==
A Melbourne based band took influence from the film now going by the same name, see Shock Corridor (Band)

== See also ==
- List of cult films
- Mental illness in film

== Sources ==
- Fuller, Samuel (2002). A Third Face: My Tale of Writing, Fighting and Filmmaking. New York City, New York: Alfred A. Knopf. ISBN 978-0-375-40165-7.
- Kolker, Robert (2011). A Cinema of Loneliness (4th ed.). Oxford, England: Oxford University Press. ISBN 978-0-199-78028-0.
