= Samuel Fuller =

American filmmaker, writer, and actor (1912–1997)

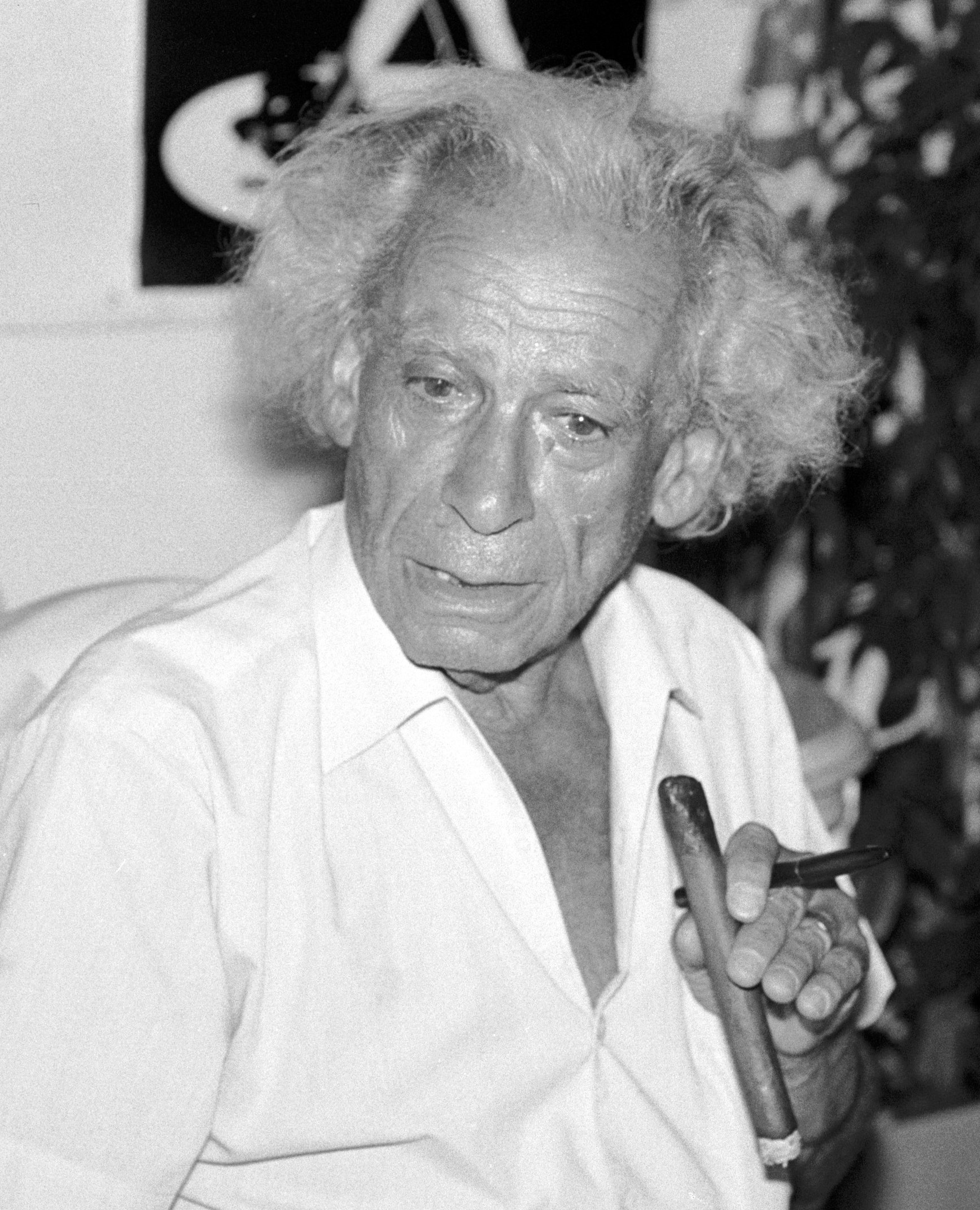
- Fuller in Normandy, France, in 1987
- Born: Samuel Michael Fuller; August 12, 1912; Worcester, Massachusetts, U.S.
- Died: October 30, 1997 (aged 85); Los Angeles, California, U.S.
- Other name: Sam Fuller
- Occupations: Director; screenwriter; novelist; journalist; actor
- Years active: 1936–1994
- Spouses: Martha Downes Fuller (div. 1959) Christa Lang (m. 1967)

Samuel Michael Fuller (August 12, 1912 – October 30, 1997) was an American film director, screenwriter, novelist, journalist, and actor. He was known for directing low-budget genre movies with controversial themes, often made outside the conventional studio system.

After working as a reporter and a pulp novelist, Fuller wrote his first screenplay for Hats Off in 1936, and made his directorial debut with the Western I Shot Jesse James (1949). He continued to direct several other Westerns and war films throughout the 1950s. He shifted genres in the 1960s with his low-budget thriller Shock Corridor in 1963, followed by the neo-noir The Naked Kiss (1964).

Fuller was inactive in filmmaking for most of the 1970s, before writing and directing the semi-autobiographical war epic The Big Red One (1980), and the drama White Dog (1982), whose screenplay he co-wrote with Curtis Hanson. Several of his films influenced French New Wave filmmakers, notably Jean-Luc Godard, who gave him a cameo appearance in Pierrot le Fou (1965). In the latter part of his career, he worked mainly in Europe and lived in Paris.

== Early life ==
Samuel Michael Fuller was born in Worcester, Massachusetts, of Jewish parents, Rebecca (née Baum) and Benjamin Fuller. His father died in 1923 when Samuel was 11. After immigrating to the United States, the family's surname was changed from Rabinovitch to Fuller, a name possibly inspired by a doctor named Samuel Fuller, who arrived in America on the Mayflower. In his autobiography, A Third Face (2002), he says that he did not speak until he was almost five. His first word was "Hammer!"

After his father's death, the family moved to New York City, where at the age of 12, he began working as a newspaper copyboy. He became a crime reporter in New York City at age 17, working for the New York Evening Graphic. He broke the story of actress Jeanne Eagels' death. He wrote pulp novels, including The Dark Page (1944; reissued in 2007 with an introduction by Wim Wenders), which was later adapted into the 1952 movie Scandal Sheet.

Late in life he said, "If only a reporter could get a thousand dollars an hour the way a director does, I'd be in it today".

== Military service ==
During World War II, Fuller joined the United States Army. He was assigned as an infantryman to the 16th Infantry Regiment, 1st Infantry Division, and saw heavy fighting. He was involved in landings in Africa, Sicily, and Normandy, and also saw action in Belgium and Czechoslovakia. In 1945, he was present at the liberation of a German concentration camp in Falkenau. He shot 16-mm footage, known as V-E +1, that was later integrated into the French documentary Falkenau: The Impossible (1988). In 2014, V-E+1 was selected for preservation in the United States National Film Registry by the Library of Congress.

For his military service, Fuller was awarded the Silver Star, Bronze Star, Purple Heart, and Combat Infantryman Badge. He reached the rank of corporal. Fuller used his wartime experiences as material in his films, especially in The Big Red One (1980), the nickname for the U.S. 1st Infantry Division. After the war, Fuller co-authored a regimental history of the 16th Infantry.

== Career ==
=== Writing and directing ===
Hats Off (1936) marked Fuller's first credit as a screenwriter. He wrote many screenplays throughout his career, such as Gangs of the Waterfront in 1945. He was unimpressed with Douglas Sirk's direction of his Shockproof screenplay, and made the jump to writer/director after being asked to write three films by independent producer Robert Lippert. Fuller agreed to write them if he would be allowed to direct them, as well, with no extra fee. Lippert agreed. Fuller's first film under this arrangement was I Shot Jesse James (1949), followed by The Baron of Arizona with Vincent Price.

Fuller's third film, The Steel Helmet, established him as a major force. The first film about the Korean War, made just six months into that conflict, he wrote it based largely on his own World War II experiences and tales coming out of Korea. The film was attacked by reporter Victor Riesel for being "pro-Communist" and "anti-American." Critic Westford Pedravy alleged Fuller was secretly financed by "the Reds." Fuller had a major argument with the U.S. Army, which provided stock footage for the film. When army officials objected to Fuller's American characters executing a prisoner of war, Fuller replied he had seen it done during his own military service. A compromise was reached when the lieutenant threatens the sergeant with a court martial. The film marked the first collaboration between Fuller and actor Gene Evans. The studio wanted a more prominent star such as John Wayne, but Fuller was adamant that Evans be used because he was impressed by his fellow veteran's authentic portrayal of a soldier.

After the success of The Steel Helmet, Fuller was sought out by the major studios. All gave him advice on tax shelters, except for Darryl F. Zanuck of 20th Century-Fox, who replied, "We make better movies," the answer Fuller was seeking. Zanuck signed Fuller for a contract for seven films, the first being another Korean War film, Fixed Bayonets!, to head off other studio competition copying The Steel Helmet. The U.S. Army assigned Medal of Honor recipient Raymond Harvey as Fuller's technical advisor; the two struck up a long friendship during filming, and Harvey later returned to advise him on Verboten!.

The proposed seventh film, Tigrero, based on a book by Sasha Siemel, is the subject of a 1994 documentary by Mika Kaurismäki. Tigrero: A Film That Was Never Made featured Fuller and Jim Jarmusch visiting the proposed Amazon locations of the film. Film Fuller shot on location at the time was featured in his Shock Corridor.

Fuller's favorite film was Park Row, a story of American journalism. Zanuck had wanted to adapt it into a musical, but Fuller refused. Instead, he started his own production company with his profits to make the film on his own. Park Row was a labor of love and served as a tribute to the journalists he knew as a newsboy. His flourishes of style on a very low budget led critics such as Bill Krohn to compare the film to Citizen Kane. Fuller followed this with Pickup on South Street (1953), a film noir starring Richard Widmark, which became one of his best-known films. Other films Fuller directed in the 1950s include House of Bamboo, Forty Guns, and China Gate, which led to protests from the French government and a friendship with writer Romain Gary. After leaving Fox, Fuller started his Globe Productions that made Run of the Arrow, Verboten!, and The Crimson Kimono, and produced, wrote, and directed a television pilot about World War II soldiers to be titled Dogface, which was not picked up.

In 1961, Warner Bros. offered to finance The Big Red One in return for his making Merrill's Marauders. When Fuller had problems with Warner Bros.' editing of his film, the Big Red One fell through.

Fuller's films throughout the 1950s and early 1960s generally were lower-budget genre movies exploring controversial subjects. Shock Corridor (1963) is set in a psychiatric hospital, while The Naked Kiss (1964) featured a prostitute attempting to change her life by working in a pediatric ward. Both films were released by Allied Artists.

Between 1967 and 1980, Fuller directed only one film, the Mexican-produced Shark! (1969). Fuller unsuccessfully asked the Directors Guild to remove his name from the credits of Shark. He returned in 1980 with the epic The Big Red One, the semiautobiographical story of a platoon of soldiers and their harrowing experiences during World War II. The film won critical praise, but failed at the box office.

"Shelve the film without letting anyone see it? I was dumbfounded. It's difficult to express the hurt of having a finished film locked away in a vault, never to be screened for an audience. It's like someone putting your newborn baby in a goddamned maximum-security prison forever ... Moving to France for a while would alleviate some of the pain and doubt that I had to live with because of White Dog."

— White Dog: Sam Fuller Unmuzzled, Samuel Fuller, as quoted by J. Hoberman, Criterion Collection

In 1981, he was selected to direct the film White Dog, based on a novel by Romain Gary. The controversial film depicts the struggle of a black dog trainer trying to de-program a "white dog," a stray that was programmed to attack any black person viciously. He readily agreed to work on the film, having focused much of his career on racial issues. Already familiar with the novel and with the concept of "white dogs," he was tasked with "reconceptualizing" the film to have the conflict depicted in the book occur within the dog rather than the people. He used the film as a platform to deliver an anti-racist message through the film's examination of the question of whether racism is a treatable problem or an incurable disease.

During filming, Paramount Pictures grew increasingly concerned the film would offend African-American viewers, and brought in two consultants to review the work and offer their approval on the way Black characters were depicted. One felt the film had no racist connotations, while the other, Willis Edwards, vice president of the Hollywood NAACP chapter, felt the film was inflammatory and should never have been made. The two men provided a write-up of their views for the studio executives, which were passed to producer Jon Davison along with warnings that the studio was afraid the film would be boycotted. Fuller was not told of these discussions, nor given the notes until two weeks before filming was slated to conclude. Known for being a staunch integrationist and for regularly giving Black actors nonstereotypical roles, Fuller was furious, finding the studio's actions insulting. He reportedly had both representatives banned from the set afterwards, though he did integrate some of the suggested changes into the film. After the film's completion, Paramount refused to release it, declaring it did not have enough earnings potential to go against the threatened NAACP boycotts and possible bad publicity.

After White Dog was shelved by Paramount Pictures, Fuller moved to France in 1982 and never directed another American film. He directed two theatrical French films, Les Voleurs de la nuit in 1984 and Street of No Return in 1989. Les Voleurs de la nuit was entered into the 34th Berlin International Film Festival. He directed his last film, The Madonna and the Dragon, in 1990, and he wrote his last screenplay, Girls in Prison, in 1994.

With his wife, Christa Lang, and Jerry Rudes, Fuller wrote an autobiography A Third Face (published in 2002). This was the culmination of a long career as an author. Among his books are the novels "Burn, Baby, Burn" (1935), Test Tube Baby (1936), Make Up and Kiss (1938), and The Dark Page (1944). Novelizations of his films include The Naked Kiss (1964), The Big Red One (1980; reissued 2005), 144 Piccadilly (1971), and Quint's World (1988). A book-length interview of Fuller by Jean Narboni and Noel Simsolo, Il etait une fois ... Samuel Fuller (with a preface by Martin Scorsese) appeared in 1986.

=== Acting ===
Fuller made a cameo appearance in Jean-Luc Godard's Pierrot le Fou (1965), where he famously intones: "Film is like a battleground ... Love, hate, action, violence, death. In one word, emotion!" He also made a cameo appearance at an outdoor cafe in Luc Moullet's Brigitte et Brigitte (1966) along with French New Wave directors Claude Chabrol, Eric Rohmer, and André Téchiné. He plays a film director in Dennis Hopper's ill-fated The Last Movie (1971); an Army colonel in Steven Spielberg's 1941 (1979); a war correspondent in his film The Big Red One (scene deleted in the original release, restored in the reconstructed version), a talent agent in his film White Dog (1981), and a cameraman in Wim Wenders' The State of Things (1982). He portrays an American gangster in two films set in Germany: The American Friend by Wenders and Helsinki Napoli All Night Long by Mika Kaurismäki. He also appeared in Larry Cohen's A Return to Salem's Lot (1987), and played a businessman in La Vie de Bohème (1992) by Aki Kaurismäki. His last work in film was as an actor in The End of Violence (1997). A photo of Fuller also appears on one of the mirrors of a stripper in his Shock Corridor.

== Style and themes ==
Fuller's work has been described as primitive by Luc Moullet and by the influential American critics Manny Farber and Andrew Sarris. Grant Tracey has used the term "narrative tabloid" to refer to Fuller's style of filmmaking. This was the result of his often lower budgets, but also reflected Fuller's pulp-inspired writing.

Fuller was known for using intense close-ups, off-center framings, and shock editing in many of his films, which were often about men facing death in combat. These scenes were both violent and tragic. Fuller often featured marginalized characters in his films. The protagonist of Pickup on South Street is a pickpocket who lives on a floating shack in the East River. Shock Corridor concerns the patients of a mental hospital. Underworld U.S.A. (1961) focuses on an orphaned victim of mobsters. The lead female characters of Pickup on South Street, China Gate, and The Naked Kiss are prostitutes or gun molls. These characters sometimes find retribution for the injustices against them. White Dog and The Crimson Kimono (1959) have definite antiracist elements. The Steel Helmet, set during the Korean War, features a racially mixed cast and contains dialogue about the internment of Japanese-Americans and the segregation of the American military in World War II.

Several Fuller's films, including The Naked Kiss, The Baron of Arizona, Shockproof, House of Bamboo, Forty Guns, and The Big Red One, feature a leading character with the same name, Griff.

== Later life and death ==
In the early 1990s, Samuel Fuller, along with his wife, Christa, and their daughter Samantha, settled into a small apartment at 61 rue de Reuilly in the 12th arrondissement of Paris, but after he suffered a stroke in 1994, they returned to the States the following year. They resided in Los Angeles, where Fuller lived until he died at home of natural causes.

In November 1997, the Directors Guild held a three-hour memorial in his honor, hosted by Curtis Hanson, his longtime friend and co-writer on White Dog. He was survived by his wife and daughter.

== Legacy ==
Although Fuller's films were not considered great cinema in their time, they gained critical respect in the late 1960s. Fuller welcomed the newfound esteem, appearing in films of other directors and associating himself with younger filmmakers. The French New Wave claimed Fuller as a major stylistic influence, especially Luc Moullet. His visual style and rhythm were seen as distinctly American, and praised for their energetic simplicity. Martin Scorsese praised Fuller's ability to capture action through camera movement. In the 1996 Adam Simon-directed documentary The Typewriter, the Rifle & the Movie Camera, Quentin Tarantino and Jim Jarmusch credited Fuller as influential upon their works. Most recently, his wife Christa Lang produced a documentary directed by their daughter Samantha about him. A Fuller Life uses footage he captured himself with celebrities such as James Franco reading from his autobiography.

In the mid-1980s, Fuller was the first international director to be a guest at the Midnight Sun Film Festival. The festival's hometown, Sodankylä, Finland, named a street "Samuel Fullerin katu" ("Samuel Fuller's street").

The moving image collection of Samuel Fuller is housed at the Academy Film Archive. The archive has preserved several of Samuel Fuller's films, including The Crimson Kimono, Underworld U.S.A., and Pickup on South Street. Additionally, the archive has preserved several of Fuller's home movies, including those shot during his war service.

== Filmography ==
=== Film ===
Year	Title	Director	Writer	Producer	Notes
1936	Hats Off	No	Yes	No	
1937	It Happened in Hollywood	No	Yes	No	
1938	Adventure in Sahara	No	Story	No	
1938	Federal Man-Hunt	No	Story	No	
1938	Gangs of New York	No	Story	No	
1940	Bowery Boy	No	Yes	No	
1941	Confirm or Deny	No	Story	No	
1943	Margin for Error	No	Uncredited	No	
1943	Power of the Press	No	Story	No	
1945	Gangs of the Waterfront	No	Story	No	
1949	Shockproof	No	Yes	No	
1949	I Shot Jesse James	Yes	Yes	No	
1950	The Baron of Arizona	Yes	Yes	No	
1951	The Steel Helmet	Yes	Yes	Yes	
1951	Fixed Bayonets!	Yes	Yes	No	
1951	The Tanks Are Coming	No	Story	No	
1952	Park Row	Yes	Yes	Yes	
1953	Pickup on South Street	Yes	Yes	No	
1954	Hell and High Water	Yes	Yes	No	
1955	House of Bamboo	Yes	Yes	No	
1957	China Gate	Yes	Yes	Yes	
1957	Run of the Arrow	Yes	Yes	Yes	
1957	Forty Guns	Yes	Yes	Yes	
1959	Verboten!	Yes	Yes	Yes	
1959	The Crimson Kimono	Yes	Yes	Yes	
1961	Underworld U.S.A.	Yes	Yes	Yes	
1962	Merrill's Marauders	Yes	Yes	No	
1963	Shock Corridor	Yes	Yes	Yes	
1964	The Naked Kiss	Yes	Yes	Yes	
1967	The Cape Town Affair	No	Yes	No	
1968	Targets	No	Uncredited	No	
1969	Shark!	Yes	Yes	No	
1973	The Deadly Trackers	No	Yes	No	Replaced as director by Barry Shear
1974	Alice in the Cities	No	Uncredited	No	
1974	The Klansman	No	Yes	No	
1980	The Big Red One	Yes	Yes	No	
1982	White Dog	Yes	Yes	No	
1984	Thieves After Dark	Yes	Yes	No	
1986	Let's Get Harry	No	Story	No	
1989	Street of No Return	Yes	Yes	No	Also supervising editor
1994	Girls in Prison	No	Yes	No	

Acting roles

Year	Title	Role	Notes
1955	House of Bamboo	Policeman	Uncredited
1965	Pierrot le Fou	Himself	
1966	Brigitte et Brigitte	Himself	
1971	The Last Movie	Sam	
1973	The Young Nurses	Doc Haskell	
1977	Scott Joplin	Impersario	
1977	The American Friend	The American	
1979	1941	Interceptor Commander	
1980	The Big Red One	War Correspondent	
1982	Hammett	Man in Pool Hall	
1982	White Dog	Charles Felton	
1982	The State of Things	Joe	
1982	Slapstick of Another Kind	Col. Sharp	
1984	Thieves After Dark	Zoltan	Uncredited
1987	A Return to Salem's Lot	Dr. Van Meer	
1989	Street of No Return	Police Commissioner	
1989	Sons	Father	
1992	La Vie de bohème	Gassot	
1992	Golem, the Spirit of the Exile	Elimelek	
1994	Golem, le jardin pétrifié	Sam	
1994	Somebody to Love	Sam Silverman	
1996	Metamorphosis of a Melody	Flavius Josephus (voice)	
1997	The End of Violence	Louis Bering	

=== Television ===
Year	Title	Director	Writer	Notes
1959	Dog Face	Yes	No	Television film
1962	The Dick Powell Show	Yes	No	Episode: "330 Independence S.W."
1962	The Virginian	Yes	No	Episode: "It Tolls for Thee"
1966-67	Iron Horse	Yes	No	6 episodes
1972	Tatort	Yes	Yes	Episode: "Dead Pigeon on Beethoven Street"
1990	Chillers	Yes	No	Episode: "The Day of Reckoning"
1990	The Madonna and the Dragon	Yes	Yes	Television film

Producer

Year	Title	Notes
1950–54	The Colgate Comedy Hour	Executive/supervising producer(19 episodes); Production manager (15 episodes)
1952–53	Four Star Revue	Executive producer (4 episodes)

Acting roles

Year	Title	Role	Notes
1972	Tatort	Senator	Episode "Dead Pigeon on Beethoven Street"
1984	The Blood of Others	Old Man in Cafe	Television film
1988	Médecins des hommes	American Captain	Episode: "Mer de Chine: Le pays pour mémoire"
1989	David Lansky	Capodagli / John Fraser	Episode "L'enfant americain"
1990	The Madonna and the Dragon	Newsweek Editor	Television film
1994	Le cascadeur	William Davidson	Episode "Le saut de la mort"

== Bibliography ==
Table featuring novels and novellas by Ernest Hemingway
Year	Title	Publisher
1935	Burn, Baby, Burn	Phoenix Press
1936	Test Tube Baby	William Godwin
1938	Make Up and Kiss	William Godwin
1944	The Dark Page (reissued as Murder Makes a Deadline)	Duell, Sloan, and Pearce
1964	The Naked Kiss (novelization of his film)	Belmont
1966	Crown of India	Award
1971	144 Piccadilly	Baron
1974	Dead Pigeon on Beethoven Street	Pyramid
1980	The Big Red One	Bantam Books
1984	Quint's World	Don Mills
1986	Pecos Bill and the Soho Kid	Les Editions Bayard
1993	Brainquake	Hard Case Crime
2002	A Third Face: My Tale of Writing, Fighting, and Filmmaking	Alfred A. Knopf

== Awards and nominations ==
Table featuring novels and novellas by Ernest Hemingway
Institution	Year	Category	Work	Result
Berlin International Film Festival	1984	Golden Bear	Thieves After Dark	Nominated
Cahiers du Cinéma	1965	Annual Top 10 Lists	Shock Corridor	7th place
Cahiers du Cinéma	1982	Annual Top 10 Lists	White Dog	4th place
Cannes Film Festival	1980	Palme d'Or	The Big Red One	Nominated
Deauville American Film Festival	1991	Lucien Barriere Award	—N/a	Won
Directors Guild of America Awards	1955	Outstanding Directing – Feature Film	Hell and High Water	Won
Independent Spirit Awards	1996	Special Distinction Award	—N/a	Won
Locarno Film Festival	1993	Leopard of Honor	—N/a	Won
Los Angeles Film Critics Association	1987	Career Achievement Award	—N/a	Won
Valladolid International Film Festival	1966	Golden Spike	Shock Corridor	Won
Valladolid International Film Festival	1966	CEC Award	Shock Corridor	Won
Venice Film Festival	1953	Golden Lion	Pickup on South Street	Nominated
Venice Film Festival	1953	Bronze Lion	Pickup on South Street	Won
Writers Guild of America Awards	1952	Best Written American Drama (Low-Budget)	The Steel Helmet	Won
