= Luc Moullet =

French film critic and director

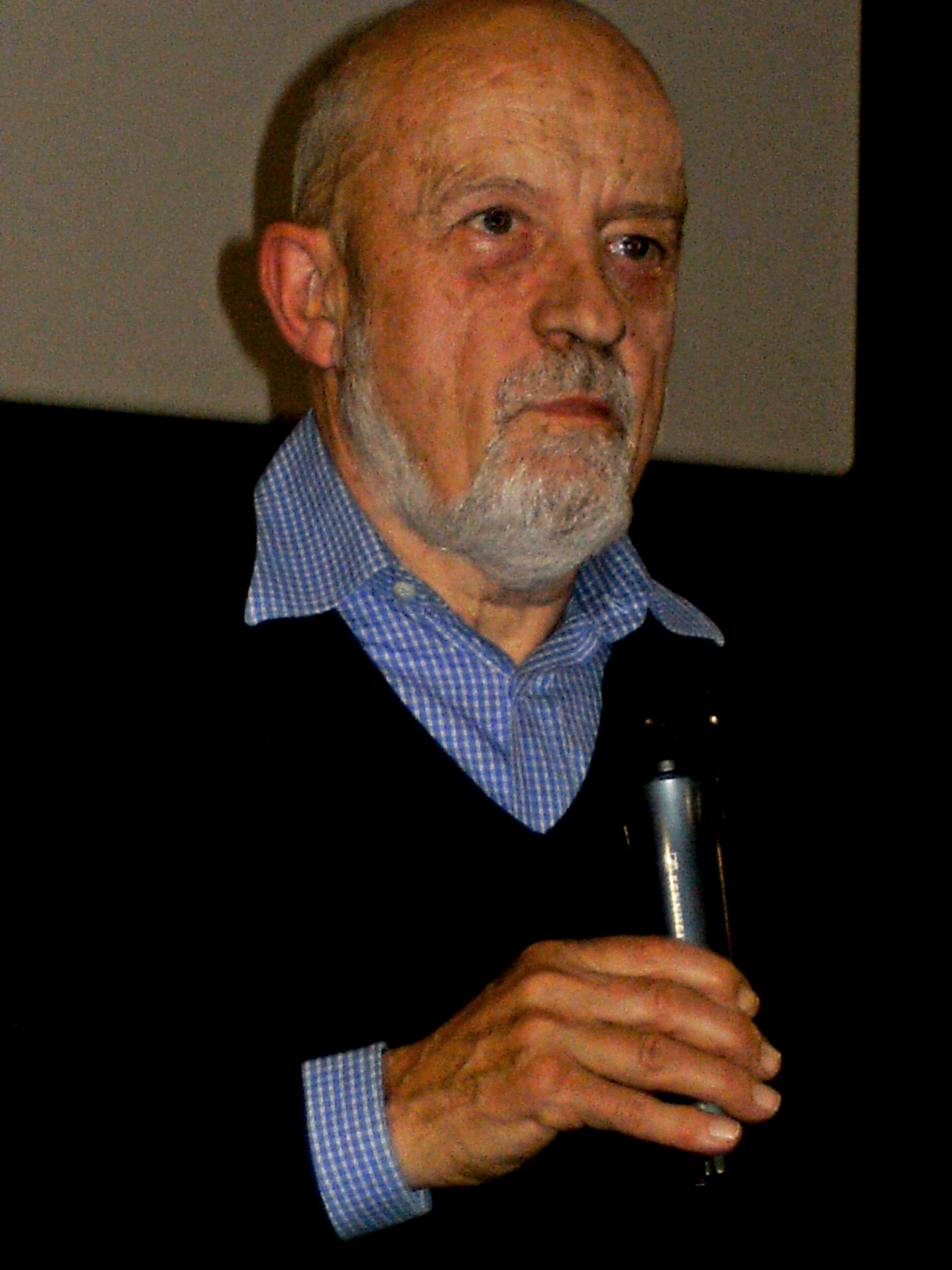
- Luc Moullet in 2009
- Born: 14 October 1937 (age 88); Paris, France
- Citizenship: French
- Occupations: Film critic, director, screenwriter, actor
- Years active: 1954–present
- Notable work: Brigitte et Brigitte
- Movement: French New Wave

Luc Moullet (French: [mulɛ]; born 14 October 1937 in Paris) is a French film critic and filmmaker, and a member of the Nouvelle Vague or French New Wave. Moullet's films are known for their humor, anti-authoritarian leanings and rigorously primitive aesthetic, which is heavily influenced by his love of American B-movies.

Though such influential filmmakers and critics as Jean-Luc Godard, Jean-Marie Straub, Jacques Rivette and Jonathan Rosenbaum have consistently praised his work, he has never found commercial success, even in his native France.

Moullet is known to frequently act in his movies.

== Early life, criticism and the French New Wave ==
Moullet began writing for Cahiers du cinéma at the age of eighteen, where he was an early champion of the films of Samuel Fuller. Though reportedly initially disliked by François Truffaut, the brash critic found a defender in a young Jean-Luc Godard. In one of his articles for the Cahiers (published in the March 1959) Moullet stated that "Morality is a question of tracking shots", a phrase which, along with Jean-Luc Godard's alternative, formulated shortly afterwards ("Tracking shots are a question of morality"), has since become well known in French cinema studies.

Moullet's first short film was intended to be shown before Godard's second feature, Le Petit Soldat, which was banned due to its political content. After several more shorts failed to attract attention, Moullet returned to criticism, authoring major studies on several directors (most notably a book on Fritz Lang which Brigitte Bardot is seen reading in Godard's Contempt).

His first feature, made in 1966, was the comedy Brigitte et Brigitte, which follows two young women who share a name and a Paris apartment. The film features cameos by Samuel Fuller, Claude Chabrol, Eric Rohmer and André Téchiné. It was followed the next year by Les Contrebandières (The Smugglers), a B-movie-influenced love triangle centered on contraband runners in an imaginary country.

In 1971, Moullet made his first color film, Une aventure de Billy le Kid, also known by its English title, A Girl Is a Gun. A psychedelic Western starring French New Wave icon Jean-Pierre Léaud, the film was never released in France, but was instead shown abroad in an English-dubbed version. The dubbing, conceived by Moullet as a tribute to the "shabbiness" he always admired in American genre films, is intentionally bad, and the short, slight Leaud is given a mismatched deep voice.

== Filmmaking ==
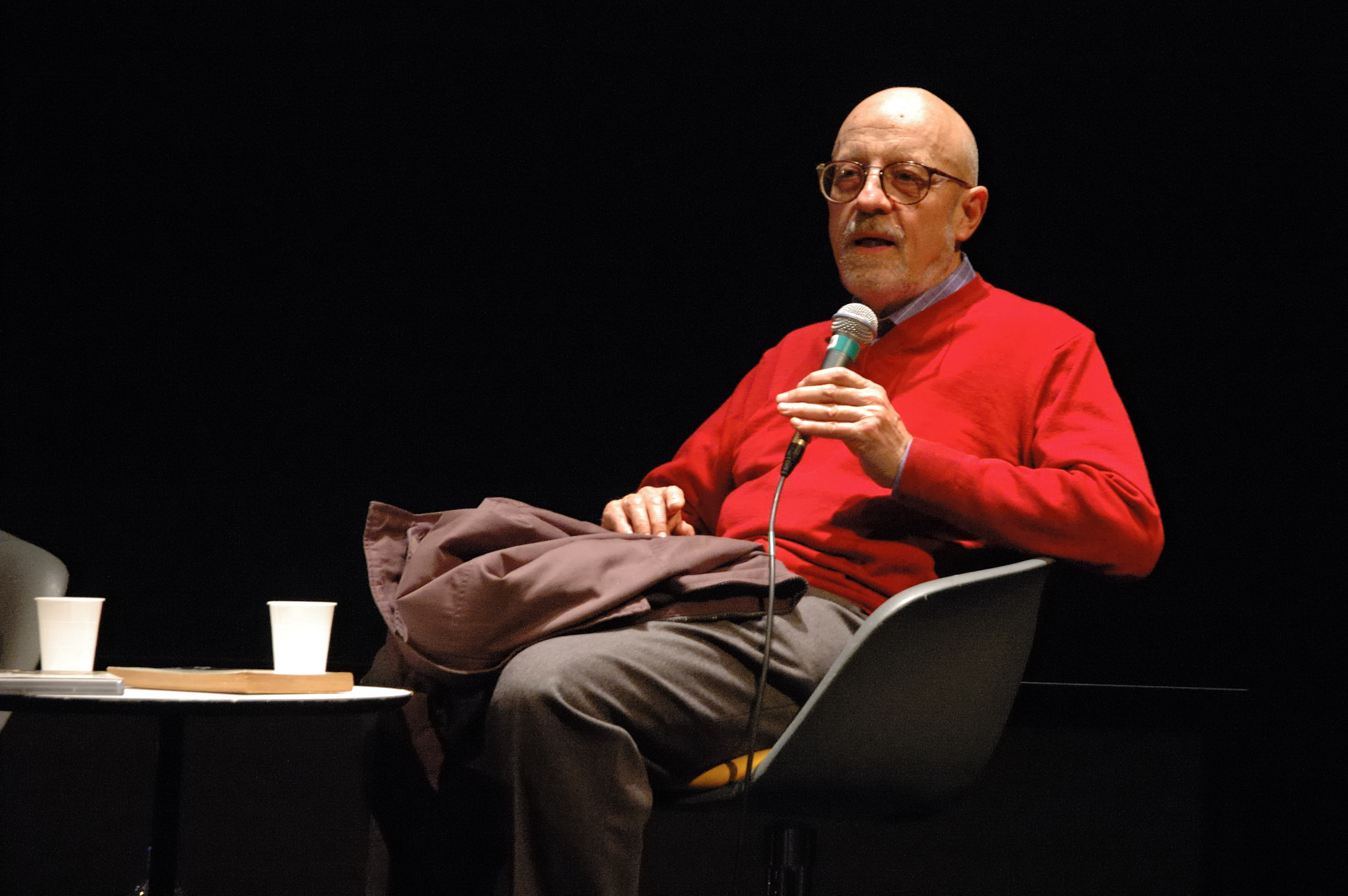
Luc Moullet at the Cinémathèque Française in 2008.

Moullet continued at a relatively slow pace throughout the 1970s. His most notable film of the period is Anatomie d'un rapport (1976), a relationship drama that also attacks and parodies other relationship dramas.

In the early 1980s Moullet began to direct films at a quicker pace, making humorous short films in between his features. In 1987, his film La Comédie du travail won the Prix Jean Vigo at the Cannes Film Festival, an award usually given to young directors (Moullet was 50 at the time).

Moullet has continued making shorts and features at a steady rate throughout the 1990s and to the present. His recent works include the feature La Prestige de la mort (Death's Glamour), the working title of which was La Seule solution (The Only Solution) and La Terre de la folie (Land of Madness) (2009), along with a number of short films in 2010.

In 2009 he participated in a roundtable discussion with critics Bill Krohn and Craig Keller on the subject of Jean-Luc Godard's 1964 Une femme mariée for a book that accompanies The Masters of Cinema Series DVD release of the film. Moullet also contributed a new overture to the volume. Later in the year, the French publisher, Capricci, released two Moullet-related works: Piges choisies (Selected Filings / Selected Submissions) (an anthology of Moullet's film writing over the last fifty years), and Notre alpin quotidien (Our Daily Alpine, a pun on Notre pain quotidien or Our Daily Bread) (a new book-length interview with Moullet). In 2010, Moullet contributed a new essay to the Masters of Cinema DVD release of Max Ophüls' La signora di tutti.

== Filmography ==
=== Features ===
- 1966 Brigitte et Brigitte
- 1967 Les Contrebandières
- 1971 Une aventure de Billy le Kid/A Girl is a Gun
- 1976 Anatomie d'un rapport
- 1987 Comédie du travail, La
- 1989 Sièges de l'Alcazar, Les
- 1993 Parpaillon (TV movie)
- 2002 Naufragés de la D17, Les
- 2006 Le Prestige de la mort

=== Documentaries and shorts ===
- 1960 Un steack trop cuit
- 1961 Terres noires
- 1962 Capito?
- 1978 Genèse d'un repas
- 1981 Ma première brasse
- 1982 Introduction
- 1983 Minutes d'un faiseur de film, Les
- 1983 Les Havres
- 1984 Barres
- 1986 L'Empire de Médor
- 1987 Valse des médias, La
- 1988 Essai d'ouverture
- 1990 Sept selon Jean et Luc, La
- 1991 Cabale des oursins
- 1994 Toujours plus
- 1994 Foix
- 1995 Imphy, capitale de la France
- 1996 Ventre de l'Amérique, Le
- 1996 Odyssée du 16/9°, L'
- 1996 Fantôme de Longstaff, Le
- 1997 Nous sommes tous des cafards
- 1998 ...Au champ d'honneur
- 2000 Système Zsygmondy, Le
- 2009 La Terre de la folie
- 2010 Chef d'oeuvre?
- 2010 Toujours moins
- 2012 Catherine Breillat: The First Time
