= List of American films of 1959 =

American films released in 1959

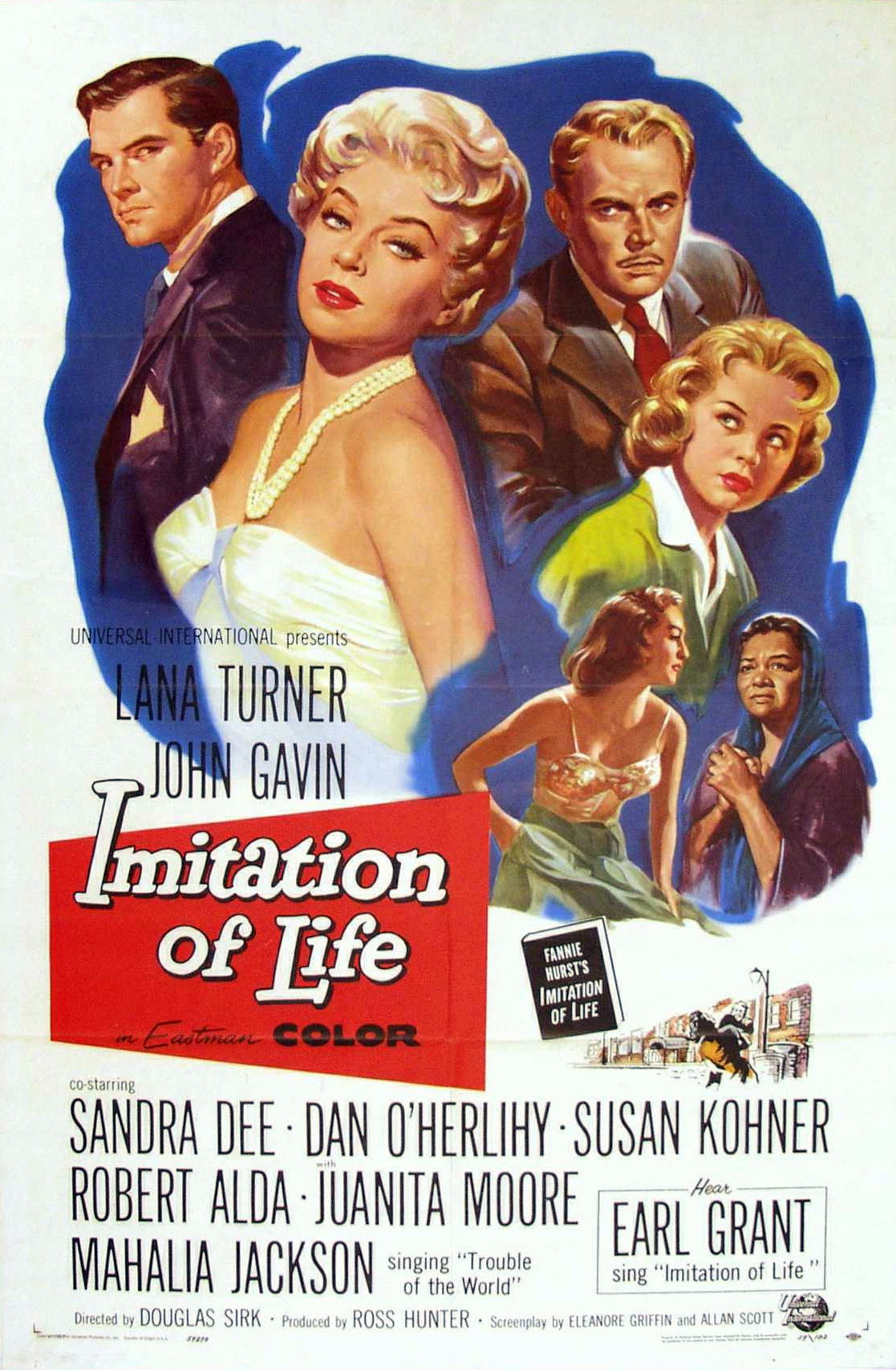
Imitation of Life, starring Lana Turner

More than 185 feature films were made in the United States and released in 1959. The film Ben-Hur won the Academy Award for Best Picture, among winning a record-setting eleven Oscars.

== A–B ==
| Title | Director | Cast | Genre | Notes |
|---|---|---|---|---|
| -30- | Jack Webb | Jack Webb, William Conrad, Nancy Valentine | Drama | Warner Bros. |
| The 30 Foot Bride of Candy Rock | Sidney Miller | Lou Costello, Dorothy Provine, Gale Gordon | Comedy | Columbia; released after Costello's death |
| 4D Man | Irvin S. Yeaworth Jr. | Robert Lansing, Lee Meriwether, Robert Strauss | Science fiction | Universal |
| Al Capone | Richard Wilson | Rod Steiger, Nehemiah Persoff, Fay Spain | Biography | Allied Artists |
| Alaska Passage | Edward Bernds | Lyn Thomas, Bill Williams, Naura Hayden | Drama | 20th Century Fox |
| Alias Jesse James | Norman Z. McLeod | Bob Hope, Rhonda Fleming, Gloria Talbott | Comedy | United Artists |
| The Alligator People | Roy Del Ruth | Beverly Garland, Bruce Bennett, Lon Chaney Jr. | Horror | 20th Century Fox |
| Anatomy of a Murder | Otto Preminger | James Stewart, Lee Remick, George C. Scott | Crime | Columbia Pictures; based on a book by Robert Traver; 7 Oscar nominations |
| The Angry Hills | Robert Aldrich | Robert Mitchum, Stanley Baker, Gia Scala | War | MGM |
| The Angry Red Planet | Ib Melchior | Gerald Mohr, Naura Hayden, Les Tremayne | Science fiction | AIP |
| Arson for Hire | Thor L. Brooks | Steve Brodie, Lyn Thomas, Lyn Osborn | Crime | Allied Artists |
| Ask Any Girl | Charles Walters | David Niven, Shirley MacLaine, Gig Young | Comedy | MGM |
| The Atomic Submarine | Spencer Gordon Bennet | Arthur Franz, Dick Foran, Brett Halsey | Science fiction | Allied Artists |
| Attack of the Giant Leeches | Bernard L. Kowalski | Ken Clarke, Yvette Vickers, Jan Shepard | Science fiction | AIP |
| The Bat | Crane Wilbur | Vincent Price, Agnes Moorehead, Darla Hood | Mystery thriller | Allied Artists. Hood's final screen appearance. |
| Battle Flame | R. G. Springsteen | Scott Brady, Elaine Edwards, Robert Blake | War | Allied Artists |
| Battle of the Coral Sea | Paul Wendkos | Cliff Robertson, Gia Scala, Patricia Cutts | War | Columbia |
| Beast from Haunted Cave | Monte Hellman | Michael Forest, Frank Wolff, Linné Ahlstrand | Science fiction | Allied Artists |
| The Beat Generation | Charles F. Haas | Mamie Van Doren, Ray Danton, Fay Spain | Crime | MGM |
| Behemoth, the Sea Monster | Eugène Lourié | Gene Evans, André Morell, John Turner | Science fiction | Allied Artists |
| Beloved Infidel | Henry King | Gregory Peck, Deborah Kerr, Eddie Albert | Biography | 20th Century Fox; life of F. Scott Fitzgerald |
| Ben-Hur | William Wyler | Charlton Heston, Stephen Boyd, Jack Hawkins | Epic | MGM; won a record 11 Academy Awards; remake of 1925 silent film |
| The Best of Everything | Jean Negulesco | Diane Baker, Stephen Boyd, Hope Lange | Drama | 20th Century Fox; 2 Oscar nominations |
| The Big Circus | Joseph M. Newman | Victor Mature, Red Buttons, Rhonda Fleming | Drama | Allied Artists |
| The Big Fisherman | Frank Borzage | Howard Keel, Susan Kohner, John Saxon | Drama | Buena Vista |
| The Big Operator | Charles F. Haas | Mickey Rooney, Steve Cochran, Mamie Van Doren | Crime | MGM |
| The Black Orchid | Martin Ritt | Sophia Loren, Anthony Quinn, Virginia Vincent | Drama | Paramount |
| Blood and Steel | Bernard L. Kowalski | John Lupton, Ziva Rodann, James Edwards | War | 20th Century Fox |
| The Blue Angel | Edward Dmytryk | May Britt, Curt Jurgens, Theodore Bikel | Drama | 20th Century Fox; remake of 1930 film |
| Blue Denim | Philip Dunne | Carol Lynley, Macdonald Carey, Brandon deWilde | Drama | 20th Century Fox |
| Born to Be Loved | Hugo Haas | Carol Morris, Barbara Jo Allen, Dick Kallman | Comedy | Universal |
| A Bucket of Blood | Roger Corman | Dick Miller, Ed Nelson, Barboura Morris | Horror | AIP |
| But Not for Me | Walter Lang | Clark Gable, Carroll Baker, Lilli Palmer | Comedy | Paramount |

== C–D ==
| Title | Director | Cast | Genre | Notes |
|---|---|---|---|---|
| Career | Joseph Anthony | Dean Martin, Tony Franciosa, Shirley MacLaine | Drama | Paramount; written by Dalton Trumbo; 3 Oscar nominations |
| Cast a Long Shadow | Thomas Carr | Audie Murphy, Terry Moore, John Dehner | Western | United Artists |
| City of Fear | Irving Lerner | Vince Edwards, Lyle Talbotm John Archer | Film noir | Columbia |
| Compulsion | Richard Fleischer | Dean Stockwell, Diane Varsi, Orson Welles | Crime drama | 20th Century Fox. Based on Leopold and Loeb. |
| The Cosmic Man | Herbert S. Greene | John Carradine, Bruce Bennett, Angela Greene | Science fiction | Allied Artists |
| Count Your Blessings | Jean Negulesco | Deborah Kerr, Rossano Brazzi, Maurice Chevalier | Comedy drama | MGM |
| Counterplot | Kurt Neumann | Forrest Tucker, Allison Hayes, Miguel Ángel Álvarez | Crime | United Artists |
| Crime and Punishment U.S.A. | Denis Sanders | George Hamilton, Mary Murphy, Marian Seldes | Crime | Allied Artists |
| The Crimson Kimono | Samuel Fuller | Victoria Shaw, Glenn Corbett, James Shigeta | Film noir | Columbia |
| Cry Tough | Paul Stanley | John Saxon, Linda Cristal, Joseph Calleia | Crime | United Artists |
| Cuban Rebel Girls | Barry Mahon | Errol Flynn, Beverly Aadland, John McKay | Drama | Independent |
| Curse of the Undead | Edward Dein | Eric Fleming, Kathleen Crowley, John Hoyt | Horror western | Universal |
| Darby O'Gill and the Little People | Robert Stevenson | Albert Sharpe, Janet Munro, Sean Connery | Adventure | Walt Disney |
| Date with Death | Harold Daniels | Gerald Mohr, Liz Renay, Harry Lauter | Crime | Independent |
| Day of the Outlaw | André de Toth | Robert Ryan, Burl Ives, Tina Louise | Western | United Artists |
| Desert Desperadoes | Steve Sekely | Ruth Roman, Akim Tamiroff, Otello Toso | Drama | RKO |
| The Devil's Disciple | Guy Hamilton | Burt Lancaster, Kirk Douglas, Laurence Olivier | Drama | United Artists; based on George Bernard Shaw play |
| The Diary of Anne Frank | George Stevens | Joseph Schildkraut, Ed Wynn, Shelley Winters | Biography | 20th Century Fox; won 3 Academy Awards |
| A Dog of Flanders | James B. Clark | David Ladd, Donald Crisp, Theodore Bikel | Drama | 20th Century Fox |
| A Dog's Best Friend | Edward L. Cahn | Bill Williams, Marcia Henderson, Roger Mobley | Drama | United Artists |
| Don't Give Up the Ship | Norman Taurog | Jerry Lewis, Dina Merrill, Gale Gordon | Comedy | Paramount |

== E–H ==
| Title | Director | Cast | Genre | Notes |
|---|---|---|---|---|
| Edge of Eternity | Don Siegel | Cornel Wilde, Victoria Shaw, Mickey Shaughnessy | Crime drama | Columbia |
| Escort West | Francis D. Lyon | Victor Mature, Elaine Stewart, Faith Domergue | Western | United Artists |
| Face of Fire | Albert Band | Cameron Mitchell, Bettye Ackerman, James Whitmore | Drama | Allied Artists |
| Face of a Fugitive | Paul Wendkos | Fred MacMurray, Myrna Fahey, James Coburn | Western | Columbia |
| The FBI Story | Mervyn LeRoy | James Stewart, Vera Miles, Murray Hamilton | Drama | Warner Bros. |
| First Man into Space | Robert Day | Marshall Thompson, Marla Landi, Robert Ayres | Science fiction | MGM |
| Five Gates to Hell | James Clavell | Patricia Owens, Dolores Michaels, Neville Brand | War Drama | 20th Century Fox |
| The Five Pennies | Melville Shavelson | Danny Kaye, Barbara Bel Geddes, Louis Armstrong | Musical | Paramount. Story of musician Red Nichols; 4 Oscar nominations. |
| The Flying Fontaines | George Sherman | Michael Callan, Joan Evans, Joe De Santis | Drama | Columbia |
| For the First Time | Rudolph Maté | Mario Lanza, Johanna von Koczian, Zsa Zsa Gabor | Musical | MGM. Co-production with West Germany. |
| Forbidden Island | Charles B. Griffith | Jon Hall, Jonathan Haze, John Farrow | Adventure | Columbia |
| The Four Skulls of Jonathan Drake | Edward L. Cahn | Eduard Franz, Valerie French, Henry Daniell | Science fiction | United Artists |
| The Fugitive Kind | Sidney Lumet | Marlon Brando, Joanne Woodward, Anna Magnani | Drama | United Artists |
| Gangster Story | Walter Matthau | Walter Matthau, Carol Grace, Garry Walberg | Crime drama | Independent |
| The Gazebo | George Marshall | Glenn Ford, Debbie Reynolds, Carl Reiner | Comedy | MGM; based on the play |
| The Gene Krupa Story | Don Weis | Sal Mineo, Susan Oliver, James Darren | Biography | Columbia. Story of drummer Gene Krupa. |
| The Giant Gila Monster | Ray Kellogg | Fred Graham, Shug Fisher, Don Sullivan | Science fiction | Independent |
| Gidget | Paul Wendkos | Sandra Dee, Cliff Robertson, James Darren | Comedy | Columbia. 4 film sequels; 2 TV series. |
| Girls Town | Charles F. Haas | Mamie van Doren, Mel Torme, Paul Anka | Drama | MGM. Anka sings "Lonely Boy". |
| Good Day for a Hanging | Nathan H. Juran | Fred MacMurray, Margaret Hayes, Robert Vaughn | Western | Columbia |
| The Great St. Louis Bank Robbery | Charles Guggenheim | Steve McQueen, Crahan Denton, David Clarke | Crime | United Artists |
| Green Mansions | Mel Ferrer | Audrey Hepburn, Anthony Perkins, Lee J. Cobb | Drama | MGM. Based on W. H. Hudson novel. |
| The Gunfight at Dodge City | Joseph M. Newman | Joel McCrea, Julie Adams, John McIntire | Western | United Artists |
| Gunmen from Laredo | Wallace MacDonald | Robert Knapp, Maureen Hingert, Walter Coy | Western | Columbia |
| Guns, Girls and Gangsters | Edward L. Cahn | Mamie Van Doren, Gerald Mohr, Lee Van Cleef | Crime | United Artists |
| The Hanging Tree | Delmer Daves | Gary Cooper, Maria Schell, Karl Malden | Western | Warner Bros.; Scott's first film |
| The Hangman | Michael Curtiz | Robert Taylor, Tina Louise, Fess Parker | Western | Paramount |
| Happy Anniversary | David Miller | David Niven, Mitzi Gaynor, Monique van Vooren | Comedy | United Artists |
| Have Rocket, Will Travel | David Lowell Rich | Three Stooges, Anna-Lisa, Jerome Cowan | Comedy | Columbia |
| Here Come the Jets | Gene Fowler Jr. | Steve Brodie, Lyn Thomas, Jean Carson | Drama | 20th Century Fox |
| Hey Boy! Hey Girl! | David Lowell Rich | Louis Prima, Keely Smith, James Gregory | Musical | Columbia |
| A Hole in the Head | Frank Capra | Frank Sinatra, Edward G. Robinson, Eleanor Parker | Comedy drama | United Artists; Oscar for song "High Hopes" |
| Holiday for Lovers | Henry Levin | Clifton Webb, Jane Wyman, Jill St. John | Comedy | 20th Century Fox |
| The Horse Soldiers | John Ford | John Wayne, William Holden, Constance Towers | War | United Artists |
| Hound-Dog Man | Don Siegel | Fabian, Carol Lynley, Stuart Whitman | Musical | 20th Century Fox |
| House on Haunted Hill | William Castle | Vincent Price, Carol Ohmart, Alan Marshal | Horror | Allied Artists. Remade in 1999. |

== I–N ==
| Title | Director | Cast | Genre | Notes |
|---|---|---|---|---|
| Imitation of Life | Douglas Sirk | Lana Turner, Sandra Dee, Juanita Moore | Drama | Universal. 2 Oscar nominations; Sirk's final film. |
| Inside the Mafia | Edward L. Cahn | Cameron Mitchell, Grant Richards, Robert Strauss | Crime | United Artists |
| Invisible Invaders | Edward L. Cahn | John Agar, Jean Byron, Robert Hutton | Science fiction | United Artists |
| Island of Lost Women | Frank Tuttle | Jeff Richards, Venetia Stevenson, Diane Jergens | Science fiction | Warner Bros. |
| It Happened to Jane | Richard Quine | Doris Day, Jack Lemmon, Ernie Kovacs | Comedy | Columbia |
| It Started with a Kiss | George Marshall | Glenn Ford, Debbie Reynolds, Eva Gabor | Romantic comedy | MGM |
| The Jayhawkers! | Melvin Frank | Jeff Chandler, Nicole Maurey, Fess Parker | Western | Paramount |
| Jet Over the Atlantic | Byron Haskin | Guy Madison, Virginia Mayo, George Raft | Drama | Inter-Continent Films |
| John Paul Jones | John Farrow | Robert Stack, Bette Davis, Marisa Pavan | Biography | Warner Bros. |
| The Journey | Anatole Litvak | Yul Brynner, Deborah Kerr, Robert Morley | Drama | MGM |
| Journey to the Center of the Earth | Henry Levin | James Mason, Pat Boone, Diane Baker | Science fiction | 20th Century Fox; from novel by Jules Verne |
| Juke Box Rhythm | Arthur Dreifuss | Jo Morrow, Jack Jones, Brian Donlevy | Musical | Columbia |
| The Killer Shrews | Ray Kellogg | Ken Curtis, Ingrid Goude, James Best | Science fiction | Independent |
| King of the Wild Stallions | R. G. Springsteen | George Montgomery, Diane Brewster, Edgar Buchanan | Western | Allied Artists |
| The Last Angry Man | Daniel Mann | Paul Muni, David Wayne, Betsy Palmer | Drama | Columbia. 2 Oscar nominations. |
| The Last Blitzkrieg | Arthur Dreifuss | Van Johnson, Dick York, Kerwin Mathews | War | Columbia |
| The Last Mile | Howard W. Koch | Mickey Rooney, Frank Overton, Michael Constantine | Crime drama | United Artists |
| Last Train from Gun Hill | John Sturges | Kirk Douglas, Anthony Quinn, Carolyn Jones | Western | Paramount |
| The Legend of Tom Dooley | Ted Post | Michael Landon, Jo Morrow, Jack Hogan | Western | Columbia |
| Li'l Abner | Melvin Frank | Peter Palmer, Leslie Parrish, Stella Stevens, | Musical comedy | Paramount. Based on Al Capp comic strip and stage musical. |
| The Little Savage | Byron Haskin | Pedro Armendáriz, Christiane Martel, Rodolfo Hoyos Jr. | Adventure | 20th Century Fox |
| Lone Texan | Paul Landres | Willard Parker, Audrey Dalton, Grant Williams | Western | 20th Century Fox |
| The Man in the Net | Michael Curtiz | Alan Ladd, Carolyn Jones, Diane Brewster | Film noir | United Artists |
| The Man Who Understood Women | Nunnally Johnson | Henry Fonda, Leslie Caron, Cesare Danova | Drama | 20th Century Fox |
| The Mating Game | George Marshall | Debbie Reynolds, Tony Randall, Paul Douglas | Comedy | MGM |
| Middle of the Night | Delbert Mann | Fredric March, Kim Novak, Glenda Farrell | Drama | Columbia |
| The Miracle | Irving Rapper | Carroll Baker, Roger Moore, Walter Slezak | Historical | Warner Bros. |
| The Miracle of the Hills | Paul Landres | Rex Reason, Betty Lou Gerson, Nan Leslie | Western | 20th Century Fox |
| Never So Few | John Sturges | Frank Sinatra, Steve McQueen, Gina Lollobrigida | War | MGM |
| Never Steal Anything Small | Charles Lederer | James Cagney, Shirley Jones, Cara Williams | Drama | Universal |
| Night of the Ghouls | Ed Wood | Kenne Duncan, Duke Moore, Valda Hansen | Horror | Independent |
| Night of the Quarter Moon | Hugo Haas | Julie London, Dean Jones, John Drew Barrymore | Drama | MGM |
| No Name on the Bullet | Jack Arnold | Audie Murphy, Charles Drake, Joan Evans | Western | Universal |
| North by Northwest | Alfred Hitchcock | Cary Grant, Eva Marie Saint, James Mason | Thriller | MGM; 3 Oscar nominations |
| The Nun's Story | Fred Zinnemann | Audrey Hepburn, Peter Finch, Edith Evans | Drama | Warner Bros.; 8 Oscar nominations |

== O–S ==
| Title | Director | Cast | Genre | Notes |
|---|---|---|---|---|
| Odds Against Tomorrow | Robert Wise | Harry Belafonte, Shelley Winters, Robert Ryan | Film noir | United Artists |
| On the Beach | Stanley Kramer | Gregory Peck, Ava Gardner, Fred Astaire | Science fiction | United Artists; 2 Oscar nominations; BAFTA award for Kramer |
| Operation Dames | Louis Clyde Stoumen | Eve Meyer, Byron Morrow, Cindy Girard | War | AIP |
| Operation Petticoat | Blake Edwards | Cary Grant, Tony Curtis, Joan O'Brien | Comedy | Universal |
| The Oregon Trail | Gene Fowler Jr. | Fred MacMurray, Nina Shipman, Gloria Talbott | Western | 20th Century Fox; became TV series |
| Paratroop Command | William Witney | Richard Bakalyan, Ken Lynch, Jack Hogan | War | AIP |
| Pier 5, Havana | Edward L. Cahn | Cameron Mitchell, Allison Hayes, Eduardo Noriega | Crime | United Artists |
| Pillow Talk | Michael Gordon | Doris Day, Rock Hudson, Tony Randall | Comedy | Universal; Oscar for screenplay, 5 nominations |
| Plan 9 from Outer Space | Ed Wood | Bela Lugosi, Maila Nurmi, Tor Johnson | Science fiction | Referenced in Ed Wood |
| Plunderers of Painted Flats | Albert Gannaway | Corinne Calvet, John Carroll, George Macready | Western | Republic |
| Porgy and Bess | Otto Preminger | Sidney Poitier, Dorothy Dandridge, Sammy Davis, Jr. | Musical | Columbia. Music by George Gershwin. |
| Pork Chop Hill | Lewis Milestone | Gregory Peck, Woody Strode, Harry Guardino | War | United Artists |
| Prisoner of the Volga | Victor Tourjansky | John Derek, Elsa Martinelli, Dawn Addams | Adventure | Paramount |
| A Private's Affair | Raoul Walsh | Sal Mineo, Christine Carère, Barbara Eden | Musical | 20th Century Fox |
| The Rabbit Trap | Philip Leacock | Ernest Borgnine, Bethel Leslie, David Brian | Drama | United Artists |
| The Rebel Set | Gene Fowler Jr. | Kathleen Crowley, John Lupton, Gregg Palmer | Drama | Allied Artists |
| The Remarkable Mr. Pennypacker | Henry Levin | Clifton Webb, Dorothy McGuire, Jill St. John | Comedy | 20th Century Fox |
| Return of the Fly | Edward Bernds | Vincent Price, Brett Halsey, Danielle De Metz | Science fiction | 20th Century Fox; sequel to The Fly |
| Ride Lonesome | Budd Boetticher | Randolph Scott, Karen Steele, Pernell Roberts | Western | Columbia |
| Rio Bravo | Howard Hawks | John Wayne, Dean Martin, Angie Dickinson | Western | Warner Bros. |
| Riot in Juvenile Prison | Edward L. Cahn | Scott Marlowe, Dorothy Provine, Marcia Henderson | Drama | United Artists |
| The Rookie | George O'Hanlon | Tommy Noonan, Julie Newmar, Peter Marshall | Comedy | 20th Century Fox |
| The Sad Horse | James B. Clark | Rex Reason, Patrice Wymore, David Ladd | Drama | 20th Century Fox |
| Say One for Me | Frank Tashlin | Bing Crosby, Debbie Reynolds, Robert Wagner | Musical | 20th Century Fox |
| Shadows | John Cassavetes | Ben Carruthers, Lelia Goldoni, Hugh Hurd | Drama | Independent |
| The Shaggy Dog | Charles Barton | Fred MacMurray, Tommy Kirk, Jean Hagen | Comedy | Disney |
| Shake Hands with the Devil | Michael Anderson | James Cagney, Don Murray, Dana Wynter | Drama | United Artists; filmed in Ireland |
| Sleeping Beauty | Clyde Geronimi | Eleanor Audley, Mary Costa, Bill Shirley | Animation | Disney |
| Solomon and Sheba | King Vidor | Yul Brynner, Gina Lollobrigida, David Farrar | Epic | United Artists |
| Some Like It Hot | Billy Wilder | Marilyn Monroe, Jack Lemmon, Tony Curtis | Comedy | United Artists; won 3 Golden Globes; nominated for 6 Oscars; remake of 1939 film |
| The Sound and the Fury | Martin Ritt | Yul Brynner, Joanne Woodward, Margaret Leighton | Drama | 20th Century Fox; from book by William Faulkner |
| Speed Crazy | William J. Hole Jr. | Brett Halsey, Yvonne Lime, Baynes Barron | Crime | Allied Artists |
| The Story on Page One | Clifford Odets | Rita Hayworth, Anthony Franciosa, Gig Young | Drama | 20th Century Fox |
| A Stranger in My Arms | Helmut Käutner | Jeff Chandler, June Allyson, Mary Astor | Drama | Universal |
| Suddenly, Last Summer | Joseph L. Mankiewicz | Katharine Hepburn, Elizabeth Taylor, Montgomery Clift | Drama | Columbia; written by Tennessee Williams; Golden Globe for Taylor |
| A Summer Place | Delmer Daves | Richard Egan, Sandra Dee, Troy Donahue | Drama | Warner Bros.; based on the novel |
| Surrender - Hell! | John Barnwell | Keith Andes, Susan Cabot, Nestor de Villa | War | Allied Artists. Co-production with the Philippines. |

== T–Z ==
| Title | Director | Cast | Genre | Notes |
|---|---|---|---|---|
| Take a Giant Step | Philip Leacock | Johnny Nash, Estelle Hemsley, Ruby Dee | Drama | United Artists |
| Tarzan, the Ape Man | Joseph M. Newman | Denny Miller, Joanna Barnes, Cesare Danova | Adventure | MGM |
| Tarzan's Greatest Adventure | John Guillermin | Gordon Scott, Anthony Quayle, Sean Connery | Adventure | Paramount |
| Teenage Zombies | Jerry Warren | Katherine Victor, Steve Conte, Brianne Murphy | Horror | Independent |
| Teenagers from Outer Space | Tom Graeff | Dawn Bender, King Moody, Harvey B. Dunn | Science fiction | Warner Bros. |
| Ten Seconds to Hell | Robert Aldrich | Jack Palance, Jeff Chandler, Martine Carol | War | United Artists. Co-production with UK. |
| Terror Is a Man | Gerardo de León | Francis Lederer, Greta Thyssen, Richard Derr | Horror | Independent. Co-production with Philippines. |
| That Kind of Woman | Sidney Lumet | Sophia Loren, Tab Hunter, Jack Warden | Drama | Paramount |
| These Thousand Hills | Richard Fleischer | Don Murray, Richard Egan, Lee Remick | Western | 20th Century Fox |
| They Came to Cordura | Robert Rossen | Gary Cooper, Rita Hayworth, Van Heflin | Western | Columbia |
| Third Man on the Mountain | Ken Annakin | Michael Rennie, James MacArthur, Janet Munro | Family | Disney |
| This Earth Is Mine | Henry King | Rock Hudson, Jean Simmons, Dorothy McGuire | Drama | Universal |
| This Happy Feeling | Blake Edwards | Debbie Reynolds, Curd Jürgens, John Saxon | Comedy | Universal |
| Thunder in the Sun | Russell Rouse | Susan Hayward, Jeff Chandler, Jacques Bergerac | Western | Paramount |
| Timbuktu | Jacques Tourneur | Victor Mature, Yvonne De Carlo, George Dolenz | Adventure | United Artists |
| The Tingler | William Castle | Vincent Price, Judith Evelyn, Patricia Cutts | Science fiction | Columbia |
| Tokyo After Dark | Norman T. Herman | Richard Long, Lawrence Dobkin, Michi Kobi | Drama | Paramount |
| The Trap | Norman Panama | Richard Widmark, Lee J. Cobb, Tina Louise | Crime | Paramount Pictures |
| Up Periscope | Gordon Douglas | James Garner, Edmond O'Brien, Andra Martin | War | Warner Bros. |
| Verboten! | Samuel Fuller | Susan Cummings, James Best, Tom Pittman | Drama | Columbia |
| Warlock | Edward Dmytryk | Richard Widmark, Henry Fonda, Dorothy Malone | Western | 20th Century Fox |
| The Wasp Woman | Roger Corman | Susan Cabot, Anthony Eisley, Barboura Morris | Horror | Allied Artists |
| Watusi | Kurt Neumann | George Montgomery, Taina Elg, David Farrar | Adventure | MGM |
| Westbound | Budd Boetticher | Randolph Scott, Virginia Mayo, Karen Steele | Western | Warner Bros. |
| The Wild and the Innocent | Jack Sher | Audie Murphy, Joanne Dru, Sandra Dee | Western | Universal |
| Woman Obsessed | Henry Hathaway | Susan Hayward, Stephen Boyd, Barbara Nichols | Drama | 20th Century Fox |
| The Wonderful Country | Robert Parrish | Robert Mitchum, Julie London, Pedro Armendáriz, | Western | United Artists |
| The World, the Flesh and the Devil | Ranald MacDougall | Harry Belafonte, Inger Stevens, Mel Ferrer | Science fiction | MGM |
| The Wreck of the Mary Deare | Michael Anderson | Gary Cooper, Charlton Heston, Michael Redgrave | Thriller | MGM. Co-production with the UK. |
| Yellowstone Kelly | Gordon Douglas | Clint Walker, Edd Byrnes, Ray Danton | Western | Warner Bros. |
| The Young Captives | Irvin Kershner | Ed Nelson, Luana Patten, Marjorie Stapp | Drama | Paramount |
| The Young Land | Ted Tetzlaff | Dennis Hopper, Patrick Wayne, Yvonne Craig | Western | Columbia |
| The Young Philadelphians | Vincent Sherman | Paul Newman, Barbara Rush, Robert Vaughn | Drama | Warner Bros. |

== Other films ==
| Title | Director | Cast | Genre | Notes |
|---|---|---|---|---|
| The Immoral Mr. Teas | Russ Meyer | | Sex comedy | |
| Jazz on a Summer's Day | Bert Stern, Aram Avakian | | Documentary | Newport Jazz Festival concert film |
| The Jazz Singer | Ralph Nelson | Jerry Lewis, Anna Maria Alberghetti | Drama | TV film |
| Window Water Baby Moving | Stan Brakhage | | Experimental | |

== See also ==
- List of 1959 box office number-one films in the United States
- AFI Catalog of Feature Films
- 1959 in the United States
