= Alaska Passage =

1959 film

- Directed by: Edward Bernds
- Written by: Edward Bernds
- Produced by: Bernard Glasser
- Starring: Bill Williams; Naura Hayden; Lyn Thomas
- Cinematography: William P. Whitley
- Edited by: Richard C. Meyer
- Music by: Alex Alexander
- Production company: Associated Producers Incorporated
- Distributed by: 20th Century-Fox
- Release date: February 11, 1959
- Running time: 71 min.
- Country: United States
- Language: English

Alaska Passage is a 1959 American crime drama film directed by Edward Bernds and starring Bill Williams and Naura Hayden. It was the first film from Associated Producers Incorporated to go into general release.

== Plot ==
Al manages a company in a small town from which trucks make regular runs to Fairbanks.

== Cast ==
- Bill Williams as Al Graham
- Naura Hayden as Tina Boyd (as Nora Hayden)
- Lyn Thomas as Janet Mason
- Leslie Bradley as Gerard Mason
- Nick Dennis as Pete Harris
- Raymond Hatton as Prospector Hank
- Fred Sherman as Radabaugh
- Court Shepard as Mac Killop (as Court Sheppard)
- Gregg Martell as McCormick
- Jess Kirkpatrick as Barney
- Jorie Wyler as Claudette
- Tommy Cook as Hubie
- Gene Roth
- Al Baffert
- Ralph Sanford as Anderson

== Production ==
Alaska Passage was the first film made by Associated Producers Incorporated (API), which had a deal with Fox to make one film a month for a year. It was also known as Alaska Highway.

== See also ==
- List of American films of 1959
