= Arline Hunter =

American actress and model (1931–2018)

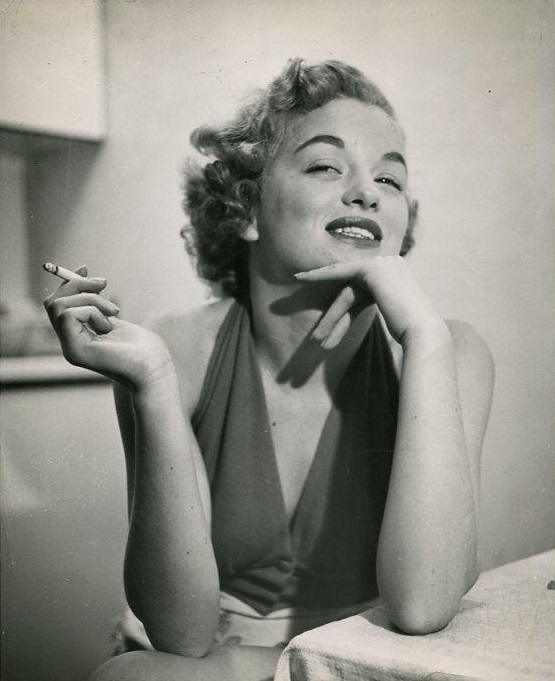
- Hunter in 1952

Playboy centerfold appearance
- August 1954
- Preceded by: Neva Gilbert
- Succeeded by: Jackie Rainbow

Personal details
- Born: December 16, 1931 Caldwell, Idaho, U.S.
- Died: September 11, 2018 (aged 86) San Pedro, California, U.S.
- Height: 5 ft 6 in (168 cm)

Arline Hunter (born Arlene J. Hunter; December 16, 1931 – September 11, 2018) was an American actress and model. She was perhaps best known as Playboy's Playmate of the Month for August 1954. Her centerfold was the first not to be purchased from the John Baumgarth Co. by Hugh Hefner, and was instead photographed by Ed DeLong, who went on to become one of the more prolific Playboy photographers in the 1960s.

== Career ==
Much of Hunter's fame was built upon her resemblance to Marilyn Monroe.Her Playboy pose has been noted for its resemblance to Monroe's 1949 nude photo session with Tom Kelley, which was also published in Playboy. The similarity in look between Hunter and Monroe also came into play when a nude Hunter starred in a stag film called, The Apple-Knockers and the Coke. The resemblance between Hunter and Monroe reportedly led some viewers to mistakenly identify Hunter as Monroe in the film.

Hunter later appeared in a number of low-budget films, often cast in roles that emphasized her sex appeal such as White Lightnin' Road and The Art of Burlesque. She also appeared alongside the Three Stooges in 1957's Outer Space Jitters. She appeared as a dancer in Sex Kittens Go to College, which starred fellow bombshell Mamie Van Doren. She also had guest roles in prominent television series such as Perry Mason and My Three Sons, and appeared in a 1962 episode of Straightaway.

Hunter was married to Prussian-born Wolfgang Wergin until his death in February 2006. Hunter died in San Pedro, California on 11 September 2018, at the age of 86.

== Filmography ==
=== Films ===
- The Apple-Knockers and the Coke (1948)
- The Art of Burlesque (1950) as Betty
- Baghdad After Midnight (1954) (credited as Arlene Hunter)
- Casanova's Big Night (1954) (uncredited) as Girl in window
- Son of Sinbad (1955) (as Arlene Hunter) as Tartar Girl
- Outer Space Jitters (1957) (uncredited) as Sunev Girl
- Revolt in the Big House (1958) as Girl
- The Angry Red Planet (1960) as Joan
- Sex Kittens Go to College (1960) as Nurse
- The Ruined Bruin (1961)
- White Lightnin' Road (1965) as Ruby
- Don't Worry, We'll Think of a Title (1966) as Girl Student
- Big Daddy (1969)

=== Television ===
- Perry Mason - "The Case of the Fraudulent Photo" (1959) as Receptionist
- Tales of Wells Fargo - "The Jackass" (1959) as Saloon Girl
- Johnny Staccato - "Swinging Long Hair" (1960) as Photographer
- The Jim Backus Show - "Floundered in Florida" (1961) (credited as Arlene Hunter) as Angela
- My Three Sons - "Robbie and the Chorus Girl" (1965) as Beauty

== See also ==
- List of people in Playboy 1953–59

| Margie Harrison | Margaret Scott | Dolores Del Monte | Marilyn Waltz | Joanne Arnold | Margie Harrison |
| Neva Gilbert | Arline Hunter | Jackie Rainbow | Madeline Castle | Diane Hunter | Terry Ryan |
