= Frontier Gun =

1958 film by Paul Landres

- Theatrical release poster
- Directed by: Paul Landres
- Screenplay by: Stephen Kandel
- Produced by: Richard E. Lyons
- Starring: John Agar; Joyce Meadows; Barton MacLane; Robert Strauss; Lyn Thomas; James Griffith
- Cinematography: Walter Strenge
- Edited by: Harry W. Gerstad
- Music by: Paul Dunlap
- Production company: 20th Century Fox
- Distributed by: 20th Century Fox
- Release date: December 1, 1958
- Running time: 70 minutes
- Country: United States
- Language: English

Frontier Gun is a 1958 American Western film directed by Paul Landres and written by Stephen Kandel. The film stars John Agar, Joyce Meadows, Barton MacLane, Robert Strauss, Lyn Thomas and James Griffith. The film was released on December 1, 1958, by 20th Century Fox.

== Cast ==
- John Agar as Sheriff Jim Crayle
- Joyce Meadows as Peg Barton
- Barton MacLane as Simon Crayle
- Robert Strauss as Yubo
- Lyn Thomas as Kate Durand
- James Griffith as Cash Skelton
- Morris Ankrum as Andrew Barton
- Leslie Bradley as Rev. Jacob Hall
- Doodles Weaver as Eph Loveman
- Mike Ragan as Tanner
- Tom Daly as Cowhand
- Sammy Ogg as Virgil Barton
- George Brand as Judge Ard Becker
- Claire Du Brey as Bess Loveman
- Dan White as Sam Kilgore
- Dan Simmons as Harry Corman
- Sydney Mason as Doc Studdeford
