= Invisible Invaders =

1959 film by Edward L. Cahn

- Theatrical poster.
- Directed by: Edward L. Cahn
- Written by: Samuel Newman
- Produced by: Robert E. Kent
- Starring: John Agar; Jean Byron; John Carradine; Robert Hutton; Philip Tonge
- Cinematography: Maury Gertsman
- Edited by: Grant Whytock
- Music by: Paul Dunlap
- Production company: Premium Pictures
- Distributed by: United Artists
- Release date: May 15, 1959 (US)
- Running time: 67 minutes
- Country: United States
- Language: English

Invisible Invaders is a 1959 American science fiction film starring John Agar, Jean Byron, John Carradine and Philip Tonge. It was produced by Robert E. Kent, directed by Edward L. Cahn and written by Samuel Newman. The film was released by United Artists on May 15, 1959, on a double bill with The Four Skulls of Jonathan Drake (1959).

== Plot ==
Dr. Karol Noymann, an atomic scientist, is killed in a laboratory explosion. His colleague, Dr. Adam Penner, is disturbed by the accident and resigns his position and calls for changes.

At Dr. Noymann's funeral, an invisible alien takes over Noymann's dead body. The alien, in Noymann's body, visits Dr. Penner and tells him the Earth must surrender or an alien force will invade and take over the Earth by inhabiting the dead and causing chaos. The alien demonstrates to Penner that they are able to make things invisible. Penner tells his daughter Phyllis and Dr. John Lamont about the experience and asks Dr. Lamont to relay the message to the government in Washington, D.C. The government ignores the warning and Dr. Penner is labeled a crank by the media.

Dr. Penner takes his daughter and Dr. Lamont to Dr. Noymann's grave, where they are visited by an invisible alien. Later, at the site of a plane crash, another alien takes over the body of a dead pilot, goes to a hockey game, chokes the announcer, and issues an ultimatum for the Earth to surrender. Another alien takes over a dead body from a car crash and issues the same ultimatum at a different sporting event. The media announce the threat and the governments of the world decide to resist the invasion. Aliens take over more dead bodies and blow up dams, cause fires and destroy buildings, causing chaos worldwide.

Major Bruce Jay arrives to take Dr. Penner, Phyllis and Dr. Lamont to a secret bunker. On the way, they are confronted by a scared farmer who tries to take their vehicle. The major kills the farmer and the four proceed to the bunker while an alien takes over the dead farmer's body.

At the bunker, they are contacted by the government and tasked with stopping the alien invasion. They determine that the aliens are radioactive, and decide to capture an alien to conduct tests on. They attempt to spray an alien with acrylic to seal it in plastic, but this fails. They then fill a hole with the acrylic liquid and lure an alien into it. Once captured, the encased alien is taken to the bunker.

Back at the bunker, they confine the alien in a pressure chamber and break the acrylic casing using high air pressure. The alien offers to spare their lives if they will surrender and set it free; Major Jay refuses. They try several experiments, but nothing affects the alien. Frustrated and hopeless, Dr. Lamont wants to surrender, but Major Jay does not. The two fight and inadvertently damage some electronic equipment, setting off a loud alarm. They notice that the alien reacts violently to the noise.

They build a sound gun and test it on the alien, causing it to become visible and killing it in the process. They try to inform the government, but their radio is jammed by the aliens, who are apparently nearby. Using a radio direction finder they follow the jamming signal to the alien ship, killing several aliens along the way.

Jay walks through the woods to get to the ship and is confronted by several aliens. He kills them with the sound gun, but is shot by an alien zombie in the process. Despite being wounded, he finds the alien ship and shoots it with the sound gun, causing it to explode. With the jamming signal silenced, Dr. Penner is then able to contact the government and tell them how to stop the aliens, while Phyllis tends Bruce's wound.

Later, at the United Nations in New York, Dr. Penner, Dr. Lamont, Phyllis Penner and Major Jay receive thanks for saving the world from the alien invasion.

== Cast ==
- John Agar as Major Bruce Jay
- Jean Byron as Phyllis Penner
- Philip Tonge as Dr. Adam Penner
- Robert Hutton as Dr. John Lamont
- John Carradine as Dr. Karol Noymann
- Hal Torey as The Farmer
- Paul Langton as General Stone
- Eden Hartford as WAAF Secretary
- Don Kennedy as Pilot
- Chuck Niles as Hockey Game Announcer

== Production ==
Production of Invisible Invaders began in December 1958.

The shooting schedule and budget are not known. Byron said in an interview that the "picture was filmed rather quickly. I remember the director moving from one set-up to the next very rapidly". Film critic Bill Warren called it a "cheap little picture", noting that it "couldn't possibly have had a shooting schedule longer than two weeks (probably one week)" and that the movie gives "every evidence of having been made in great haste".

Costs were held down, in part, by re-use of special effects artist Paul Blaisdell's monster costume from It! The Terror from Beyond Space (1958) also directed by Cahn) during a sequence in which one of the invaders is encased in plastic so it can be seen. According to author Randy Palmer, "To help camouflage the costume, optical effects were added to lighten the image and give it a distinct blur, so that it's very difficult to tell that the invader's true form matches that of (Blaisdell's) Martian Lizard Man". However, as Warren pointed out, by 1959 "no one cared about SF movies made on this budget level. They were just a product to get on the screen as soon as possible". Nevertheless, Blaisdell wasn't compensated for the reuse of his prop monster suit.

Warren also commented on the film's extensive use of stock footage. "A great flurry of stock shots" were used "as the invaders smash things all over the world – fires, quakes, buildings collapsing, dams bursting". This is "dispiriting," but "the very cheap and shoddy effects match the overall tone" of the movie. The stock footage includes the fatal car wreck scene from Thunder Road (1958). Footage shot for the film itself was also repeated, with scenes re-used of the invisible alien making parallel grooves in the dirt as it shuffles toward Dr. Noymann's grave and then pushes aside some bushes.

The movie ends with the narrator proudly saying that in the face of a planetary threat, all the people of Earth will unite against a common foe.

== Release ==
Invisible Invaders was released to US theaters on May 15, 1959. It was copyrighted on 8 May that year, a week before the film opened. Outside the US, it opened in Finland on August 12, 1960, and in Sweden on September 22, 1960. It was also exhibited in theaters in Brazil, Chile, Spain and the Soviet Union. In the UK, it received an "A" certificate from the British Board of Film Censors on June 15, 1959, which allowed it to be shown to "children accompanied by anyone over 16".

To drum up domestic interest in the film, Variety said in its "Exploitips" listing that "the attention-getting title is the chief selling point - a ballyhoo man dressed in a rented space suit ... will get notice from neighborhood youngsters". Whether this was actually done, or if it convinced children to attend the movie, is unknown.

In a review of the Blu-ray release of Invisible Invaders, Christopher P. Jacobs noted that in an audio commentary, noted sci-fi author Dr. Robert J. Kiss "gives some interesting data on the film's 1959 release and exhibition history, noting how it was almost always shown as the second of a double feature, quickly shifting from one-week runs to bookings of only a couple of days". However, the movie wasn't always the second feature. According to a contemporary advertisement for the New Plaza Theater in Odessa, Texas, Invisible Invaders was the third movie on a triple feature, with Plan 9 from Outer Space as the first movie and The Snorkel as the second, showing on September 27 and 28, 1959, just four months after Invisible Invaders was released.

== Reception ==
The movie had only a short run but became a minor cult film on television. Jacobs says it had "unprecedented success in 1962 prime-time TV showings, after low ratings as a late night movie". For example, Invisible Invaders was shown on Chicago's WFLD in 1971 as part of its well-known "Science Fiction Theater" program. TCM ran the film as part of a monster movie marathon on New Year's Day 2007.

Film critic Emanuel Levy rated the film 3 out of 5 stars. Writing in The Zombie Movie Encyclopedia, academic Peter Dendle said, "Though clearly a product of its own time and a low budget, Invisible Invaders is engaging and fast-paced, riddled with genuinely inspired twists alongside breathtaking implausibilities". Writing in AllMovie, critic Bruce Eder described the film as "an interesting idea for a movie, executed not badly within the context of its time" with "performances [that] are decent, if at times a bit over the top." The film is described on Turner Classic Movies as "the inspiration for Night of the Living Dead," noting that "the severe lack of funds obviously influenced the producer's decision to make the aliens invisible." Writing on DVD Talk, critic Adam Tyner noted that "Invisible Invaders doesn't exactly hold up to scrutiny," that the film's "pace is this side of glacial," and that "there's nearly as much narration as there is actual dialogue."

== Home media ==
Invisible Invaders was first released to the home video market on VHS videotape in 1996 by MGM/UA Home Video. The film was released on DVD by MGM Home Entertainment in 2003, packaged with Journey to the Seventh Planet as part of their Midnite Movies series. The Blu-ray edition, released in July 2016 by Kino Lorber, featured a full-length audio commentary by film historians Tom Weaver and Dr. Robert J. Kiss.

== Soundtrack ==
Paul Dunlap composed the music for Invisible Invaders. Dunlap would later use much of the same music in three other science fiction movies: The Angry Red Planet (1959),The Three Stooges in Orbit (1962), and Destination Inner Space (1966).
