= The Noah =

- Directed by: Daniel Bourla
- Written by: Daniel Bourla; Avraham Heffner
- Produced by: Louis De Rochemont III
- Starring: Robert Strauss; Geoffrey Holder; Sally Kirkland
- Cinematography: Jerry Kalogeratos
- Edited by: Angelo Ross
- Production company: The Noah Production Company
- Release date: April 10, 1975 (United States)
- Running time: 107 minutes
- Country: United States
- Language: English
- Budget: $200,000 (estimated)

The Noah is a 1975 post-apocalyptic film written and directed by Daniel Bourla, starring Robert Strauss in his final film performance.

== Plot ==
Noah (Robert Strauss), a career soldier and the sole survivor on Earth after a nuclear holocaust, arrives on an abandoned island untouched by radiation. During his time on the island, the isolation slowly causes his grip on sanity to loosen. As loneliness continues to impact his sanity, he creates an imaginary companion, then a companion for his companion (played by off-screen voice performances by Geoffrey Holder and Sally Kirkland), and finally an entire civilization - a world of illusion in which there is no reality but Noah, and no rules but those of the extinct world of his memory.

He begins to teach lessons to imaginary students in an empty classroom. He also commands an imaginary squadron on military maneuvers during rain storm.

When his radiation detection badge sounds an alarm, it restores a measure of his sanity. Noah realizes that the fallout has reached the island, dooming him to a slow and painful death. He lowers his flag to half mast and awaits death.

== Production ==
The idea of the film began in 1963 when Bourla accompanied Carl Foreman for a seminar on screenwriting at Hebrew University. Mickey Rooney was considered for the starring role. Bourla and Strauss did not get along well during the shoot

The film was shot in Puerto Rico in 1968, but was not completed until 1974 when funds were found for editing and the layout of its complicated sound track. It premiered on April 11, 1975, with midnight weekend screenings at the Waverly Theatre in NYC but only had four showings, with increasing audience, when a lawyer confiscated the print with a judgment for an alleged production debt - ending its run. The Noah remained unseen until 1997, when it was featured on a film classics appreciation program broadcast in New York by CUNY TV, the cable television station operated by the City University of New York. A 2005 article on Film Threat and a follow-up interview on the same site with Bourla resulted in its DVD debut in 2006.

== Cast ==
- Robert Strauss as Noah
- Geoffrey Holder as Friday (voice)
- Sally Kirkland as Friday-Anne (voice)
- David Bourla as Little Boy (voice)
- Richard Thompkins as College Student (voice)
- James Keach as Various voices
- Herbert Hartig as Various voices
- Jack Schneider as Sgt Kowalsky (voice)

== Home Release ==
As of June 2025, the entire movie is available on YouTube. A 2005 article on Film Threat and a follow-up interview on the same site with Bourla resulted in its DVD debut in 2006. The soundtrack was released as an LP in the 1970s

== Reception ==
Film Threat called the movie stunning. The South China Morning Post found the movie engaging.
