= Leslie Bradley =

English actor (1907–1974)

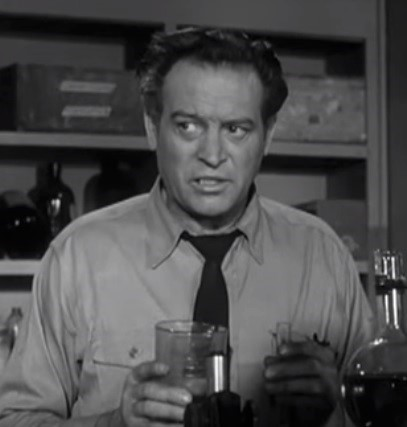
- Bradley in Attack of the Crab Monsters (1957)
- Born: Leslie Ernest Bradley; 1 September 1907; Aldershot, Hampshire, England
- Died: 20 June 1974 (aged 66); Desert Hot Springs, California, U.S.
- Occupation: Actor
- Years active: 1934–1970
- Spouse: Dorothy Ruth Rose (m. 1946)
- Children: 1

Leslie Ernest Bradley (1 September 1907 – 20 July 1974) was an English actor. He died in Desert Hot Springs, California.

== Filmography ==
- The Way of Youth (1934) as Lieut. Burton (film debut)
- Play Up the Band (1935) as Jack Heckdyke
- On Top of the World (1936) as Jimmy Priestley
- The Stoker (1937) as Frank Munro
- Holiday's End (1937) as Peter Hurst
- On Velvet (1938) as Monty
- Black Limelight (1939) as Bill - Young Detective on Duty
- Q Planes (1939) as Major Hammond's Assistant (uncredited)
- Atlantic Ferry (1941) as Horatio Stubbs
- Hi Gang! (1941) as Man
- The Young Mr. Pitt (1942) as Gentleman Jackson
- I'll Walk Beside You (1943) as Tom Booth
- The Dummy Talks (1943) (uncredited)
- Candlelight in Algeria (1944) as Henri de Lange
- Time Flies (1944) as Capt. Walter Raleigh
- Welcome, Mr. Washington (1944) as Captain Abbot
- Waterloo Road (1945) as Mike Duggan
- Flight from Folly (1945) as Bamber
- Anna Karenina (1948) as Korsunsky
- Just William's Luck (1948) as The Boss
- No Orchids for Miss Blandish (1948) as Ted Bailey
- Noose (1948) as Basher
- Prince of Foxes (1949) as Don Esteban (uncredited)
- There Is Another Sun (1951) as Track Manager
- A Case for PC 49 (1951) as Victor Palantine
- Quo Vadis (1951) as Hasta - 2nd Praetorian (uncredited)
- The Crimson Pirate (1952) as Baron José Gruda
- Slaves of Babylon (1953) as King Nebuchadnezzar
- The Dragon of Pendragon Castle (1953) as Mr. Ferber
- Man in the Attic (1953) as Constable #2
- Hell and High Water (1954) as Mr. Aylesworth (uncredited)
- The Iron Glove (1954) as Duke of Somerfield
- King Richard and the Crusaders (1954) as Castelaine Captain
- Seven Cities of Gold (1955) as Galves
- Kiss of Fire (1955) as Baron Vega
- Lady Godiva of Coventry (1955) as Count Eustace
- Good Morning, Miss Dove (1955) as Alonso Dove (uncredited)
- The Conqueror (1956) as Targutai
- Westward Ho the Wagons! (1956) as Spencer Armitage
- Naked Paradise (1957) as Zach Cotton
- Attack of the Crab Monsters (1957) as Dr. Karl Weigand
- Marjorie Morningstar (1958) as Blair (uncredited)
- Teenage Caveman (1958) as The Symbol Maker
- The Restless Gun (1958-1959, TV) as Rev. Daniel Fletcher/Cedric Mayberry
- Frontier Gun (1958) as Rev. Jacob Hall
- The Buccaneer (1958) as Capt. McWilliams
- Johnny Rocco (1958) as Father Regan
- Alaska Passage (1959) as Gerard Mason
- The Sad Horse (1959) as Jonas
- The Twilight Zone (1959, TV) as Major Devereaux
- The Life and Legend of Wyatt Earp (1960, TV) as Clark (uncredited)
- Wanted: Dead or Alive (1960, TV) as Marshal Thompson
- Young Jesse James (1960) as Major Clark
- Perry Mason (1961, TV) as Dr. Walther Braun
- The Spiral Road (1962) as Krasser
- 36 Hours (1965) as British Announcer (uncredited)
- Git! (1965) as Finney
- Assault on a Queen (1966) as Officer #3
- The Cat (1966) as Deputy Mike
- Sail to Glory (1967) as Sir Henry Bryon (final film)
