= Tom Greenway (actor) =

American film and television actor

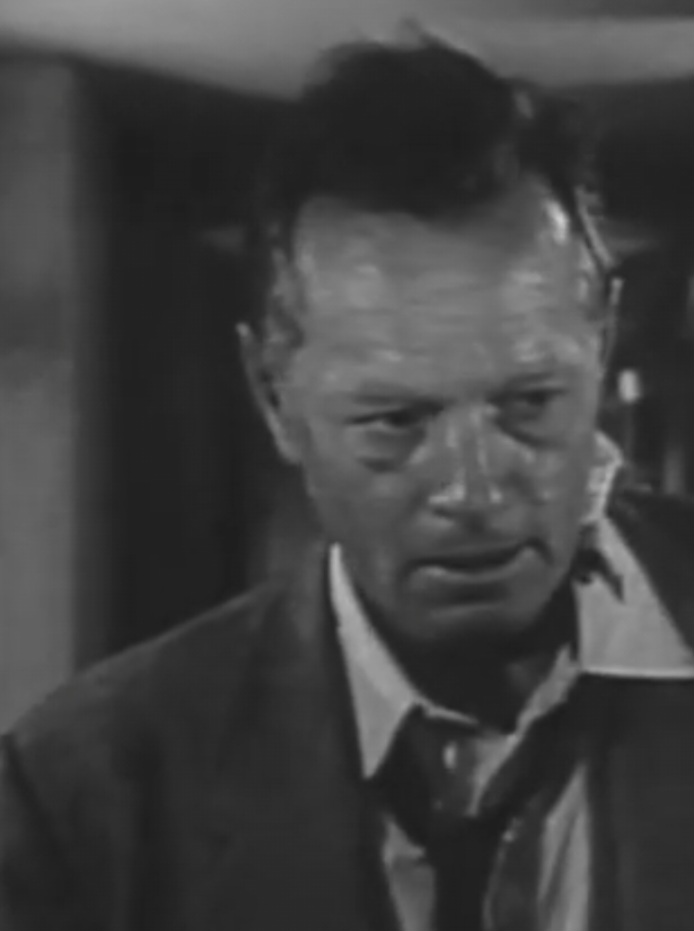
- Greenway in an episode of Medic (1954)
- Born: June 5, 1909; Booneville, Arkansas, U.S.
- Died: February 8, 1985 (aged 75); Los Angeles, California, U.S.
- Occupation: Actor
- Years active: 1949–1965
- Spouse: Helen T. Greenway (m. ?–1985)

Tom Greenway (June 5, 1909 – February 8, 1985) was an American film and television actor. He appeared in over 100 films and television programs, in which he also appeared in westerns of the 1950s, such as Big Timber. He was particularly rough on Dennis Weaver's character ("Chester Goode") on Gunsmoke, almost killing Matt Dillon's sidekick twice in 1957; first when he played the hated "Ned Pickard" in the episode "Chester's Murder" (S2E27) and later the bully "Trevitt" as he again attacks Chester in the episode "Never Pester Chester" (S3E10). He also made an appearance on High Noon. Greenway died in February 1985 of a heart attack at his home in Los Angeles, California. at the age of 75.

== Early life ==
Greenway was born in Booneville, Arkansas to Charles Sanford Greenway and his wife Lena Mai Radford, in Logan County, east of Fort Smith in western Arkansas. During World War II, he served in the United States Army Air Forces as a flight engineer on a B-17 bomber. While on a mission, he was shot down and spent more than a year in Italian and German POW camps. Released from military service, he performed on Broadway in New York City, where he procured his Social Security number, before he moved into films, where he had many uncredited roles in the early years of his career.

== Selected filmography ==
- Impact (1949) - Moving Van Driver
- Deputy Marshal (1949) - Bartender (uncredited)
- Blonde Dynamite (1950) - Mr. Carter (uncredited)
- Dakota Lil (1950) - Agent (uncredited)
- The Damned Don't Cry (1950) - Deputy Tom (uncredited)
- Love That Brute (1950) - Police Taxi Driver (uncredited)
- A Lady Without Passport (1950) - Sergeant (uncredited)
- Big Timber (1950) - Rocky
- Pretty Baby (1950) - Chauffeur (uncredited)
- I'll Get By (1950) - Moving Man (uncredited)
- The Harlem Globetrotters (1951) - Dave Barrett (uncredited)
- Never Trust a Gambler (1951) - Police Sgt. Frank Wessel (uncredited)
- Tomorrow Is Another Day (1951) - Tom (uncredited)
- Jim Thorpe – All-American (1951) - Coach Howard (uncredited)
- The Mob (1951) - Man (uncredited)
- Westward the Women (1951) - Bart (uncredited)
- The Pace That Thrills (1952) - Official (uncredited)
- High Noon (1952) - Ezra (uncredited)
- The Outcasts of Poker Flat (1952) - Townsman (uncredited)
- Carson City (1952) - Townsman (uncredited)
- The Winning Team (1952) - Telephone Lineman Foreman (uncredited)
- O. Henry's Full House (1952) - Cop (segment "The Cop and the Anthem") (uncredited)
- My Man and I (1952) - Patrolman (uncredited)
- Kansas City Confidential (1952) - Policeman (uncredited)
- Ride, Vaquero! (1953) - Deputy
- 99 River Street (1953) - Police Officer (uncredited)
- Mister Scoutmaster (1953) - Doorman (uncredited)
- The Moonlighter (1953) - Barbershop Customer (uncredited)
- How to Marry a Millionaire (1953) - Motorcycle Cop (uncredited)
- The Glass Web (1953) - District Attorney (uncredited)
- The Miami Story (1954) - Charles Earnshaw (uncredited)
- Tight Spot (1955) - Elevator Mechanic (uncredited)
- 5 Against the House (1955) - Police Lt. Anderson (uncredited)
- The Boss (1956) - Hood (uncredited)
- Tension at Table Rock (1956) - Gang Member (uncredited)
- Death of a Scoundrel (1956) - Stock Market Watcher in Montage (uncredited)
- Love Me Tender (1956) - Union Captain / Paymaster (uncredited)
- The True Story of Jesse James (1957) - Deputy Leo (uncredited)
- Last of the Badmen (1957) - Dallas
- The Deadly Mantis (1957) - Second Reporter (uncredited)
- The Wayward Bus (1957) - Mr. Breed (uncredited)
- Bernardine (1957) - Bartender (uncredited)
- Slaughter on Tenth Avenue (1957) - Stu (uncredited)
- Peyton Place (1957) - Judge (uncredited)
- The Green-Eyed Blonde (1957) - Ed
- Flood Tide (1958) - Coroner (uncredited)
- Sing Boy Sing (1958) - Reporter-Photographer (uncredited)
- The Sheepman (1958) - Rancher (uncredited)
- From Hell to Texas (1958) - Doctor (uncredited)
- A Nice Little Bank That Should Be Robbed (1958) - Lieutenant Green (uncredited)
- The Naked and the Dead (1958) - General (uncredited)
- Voice in the Mirror (1958) - Drunk-Tank Guard (uncredited)
- The Gun Runners (1958) - Deputy (uncredited)
- These Thousand Hills (1959) - Frank Chenault (uncredited)
- North by Northwest (1959) - Silent State Police Detective (uncredited)
- The Man Who Understood Women (1959) - Studio Cameraman (uncredited)
- Beloved Infidel (1959) - Director (uncredited)
- The Story on Page One (1959) - Detective Captain Kelly (uncredited)
- Let's Make Love (1960) - Board Member (uncredited)
- The Second Time Around (1961) - Deputy Shack
- The Couch (1962) - Mr. Campbell (uncredited)
- How the West Was Won (1962) - (uncredited)
- It Happened at the World's Fair (1963) - Lt. Staffer (uncredited)
- Della (1965) - Mr. Bennett (final film role)

== Television ==
Year	Title	Role	Notes
1961	Rawhide	Hawthorn	S3:E28, "Incident of the Blackstorms"
1961	Rawhide	Sheriff	S4:E4, "Judgement at Hondo Seco"
