= Paul Wexler (actor) =

American actor (1929–1979)

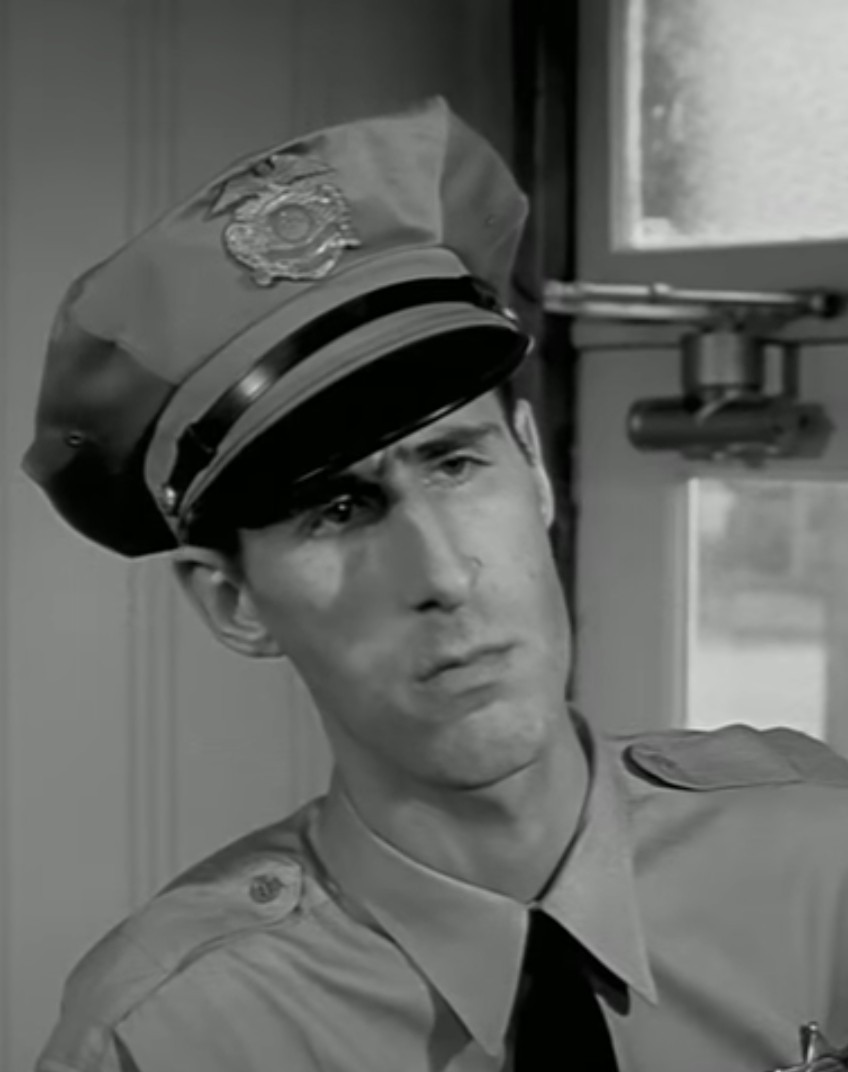
- Wexler in Suddenly (1954)
- Born: Paul Goodwin Wexler; May 23, 1929; Portland, Oregon, U.S.
- Died: November 21, 1979 (aged 50); Los Angeles, California, U.S.
- Resting place: Mount Sinai Memorial Park, Los Angeles
- Occupation: Actor
- Years active: 1950–1979
- Spouses: Susan Fox McAndie (m. 1952; died 1958): Carole Minor (m. 19??; div. 19??); Marcella Wexler (m. 19??; his death 1979)
- Children: 1

Paul Goodwin Wexler (May 23, 1929 – November 21, 1979) was an American character actor in feature films and on television for nearly 30 years, from 1950 until 1979. 6 ft 6 in (198 cm) tall and physically imposing with a long face and deep baritone voice, he specialised in macabre or off-beat roles.

== Early life and films ==
Born in Portland, Oregon, in 1929, Paul was the son of Jennie C. (nee Davis) and Herman Wexler. He appeared in more than 30 feature films during his career, making his film debut in the Bowery Boys' 1952 comedy Feudin' Fools. In that production he was cast as a slow-witted hillbilly alongside fellow character actor Robert Easton, who early in his own career specialized in playing "country bumpkins". Two of Wexler's more noteworthy films are the 1954 film noir thriller Suddenly in which he plays Slim Adams, a local deputy sheriff gunned down by a would-be presidential assassin, and the 1975 adventure film Doc Savage: The Man of Bronze in which he is the supervillain Captain Seas. With regard to bizarre roles, perhaps one of his strangest characters was Zutai, a mute "Jívaro Indian zombie", in the 1959 horror film The Four Skulls of Jonathan Drake. Wexler performed live-action reference footage that was used by Disney cartoonists to create characters in the animated feature One Hundred and One Dalmatians. He also provided the voice of the car mechanic in the film.

== Television ==
Wexler also appeared in over 40 different American television series. His first credited performance on the "small screen" was on the series Dick Tracy, which aired on ABC between 1950 and 1952 and starred Ralph Byrd. The specific episode that included Wexler is titled "Dick Tracy and Big Frost." Some of the other series in which he had roles in the 1950s and 1960s were My Hero, My Little Margie, The Lineup, The Adventures of Hiram Holliday, Studio 57, The Alaskans, The Thin Man, Tallahassee 7000, State Trooper, Jeff’s Collie (Lassie) and Ben Casey. Westerns were especially popular on American television during the 1950s and early 1960s, and Wexler portrayed characters in many series in this genre. He appeared several times on The Rifleman and Gunsmoke (“Uncle Oliver”-S2E35), as well as in episodes of other television Westerns such as Pony Express, The Life and Legend of Wyatt Earp, Rawhide, Wanted Dead or Alive, and The Guns of Will Sonnett.

Wexler played Clem Scobie, a war hero, in the 1955 episode "The Homeliest Man in Nevada" on the western anthology series, Death Valley Days. In the story line, Clem's unattractive looks at first discourage Mona Sherman (Patricia Joiner), who came to Nevada from Emporia, Kansas, from accepting his romantic gestures. When Clem is badly burned in a mining explosion, however, Mona rushes to his side and confesses her love for him. In early 1964 along with three other hopefuls, Wexler auditioned for the role of Lurch on TV’s Addams Family but was beat out by fellow character actor Ted Cassidy.

By the 1970s, Wexler had begun to limit the frequency of his acting on television and in films, possibly due to his declining health. He still continued to perform in nearly a dozen other television series during that decade, including Get Smart, Mod Squad, Switch, Charlie's Angels, Police Woman, and The Amazing Spider-Man. Wexler's final role was in a 1979 episode of Stockard Channing in Just Friends, one titled "Lost Weekend", which was broadcast in April that year, just seven months before his death.

== Personal life and death ==
Wexler was married three times, the first time to actress and fellow Oregon native Susan Fox McAndie. Their wedding was on November 29, 1952, in North Hollywood, California. She and Paul had one child together, a son named Alan Ross Wexler, who was born in 1955 but later raised by relatives in Oregon after Susan died in a car accident in 1958. Paul subsequently married another actress, Carole Minor; however, they divorced. He and his third wife, Marcella Wexler, remained together until his death.

Wexler was also a car and racing enthusiast and was one of the early presidents of the Mini Owners of America, a club devoted to the history, collection, and recreational driving of the classic "Mini-Coopers" that were produced by the British Motor Corporation between 1961 and 1971.

Wexler died of leukemia in Los Angeles, California, in November 1979. His gravesite is located in the "Canaan" section of Mount Sinai Memorial Park in Los Angeles.

== Partial filmography ==
- Feudin' Fools (1952) — Luke Smith
- Bloodhounds of Broadway (1952) — Theopolis Pace (uncredited)
- The Silver Whip (1953) — J. M. Horner (uncredited)
- The Kid from Left Field (1953) — Umpire (uncredited)
- Casanova's Big Night (1954) — Prisoner (uncredited)
- The Bowery Boys Meet the Monsters (1954) — Grissom, the Butler
- Silver Lode (1954) — Spectator at Oration (uncredited)
- Suddenly (1954) — Slim Adams
- Drum Beat (1954) — William Boddy (uncredited)
- Prince of Players (1955) — Western Man in Audience (uncredited)
- Strange Lady in Town (1955) — Townsman (uncredited)
- The Kentuckian (1955) — Fromes' brother (uncredited)
- Texas Lady (1955) — Hotel Clerk (uncredited)
- The Kettles in the Ozarks (1956) — Reverend Martin (uncredited)
- Anything Goes (1956) — Autograph Seeker (uncredited)
- The Ten Commandments (1956) — "Hebrew" at Golden Calf (uncredited)
- The True Story of Jesse James (1957) — Jayhawker (uncredited)
- Hot Summer Night (1957) — Lean Man in Bar (uncredited)
- The Buckskin Lady (1957) — Jed
- Timbuktu (1958) — Suleyman
- The Buccaneer (1958) — Horseface
- Day of the Outlaw (1959) — Vause, Bruhn's Gang (uncredited)
- The Miracle of the Hills (1959) — Sam Jones
- The Big Fisherman (1959) — Attacker at Inn (uncredited)
- The Four Skulls of Jonathan Drake (1959) — Zutai
- Visit to a Small Planet (1960) — Beatnik (uncredited)
- One Hundred and One Dalmatians (1961) — Car Mechanic (voice)
- Billy Rose's Jumbo (1962) — Sharpie (uncredited)
- Sylvia (1965) — Peter Memel
- The Busy Body (1967) — Mr. Merriwether
- The Way West (1967) — Barber (uncredited)
- Doc Savage: The Man of Bronze (1975) — Captain Seas
