= Maury Gertsman =

American cinematographer (1907–1999)

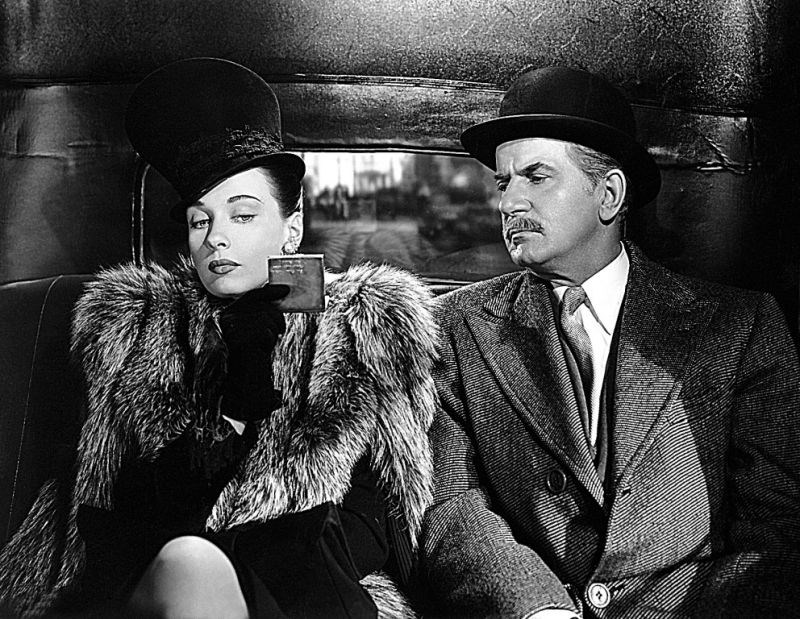
Patricia Morison & Frederick Worlock in Dressed to Kill (1946)

Morris Gertsman (17 April 1907 – 13 December 1999) was an American cinematographer at Universal Pictures from the mid-1940s through the mid-1950s.

== Career ==
Gertsman's first film of note was Jungle Captive; he shot the final two Sherlock Holmes movies starring Basil Rathbone and Nigel Bruce, Terror by Night and Dressed to Kill, and the final Rondo Hatton vehicle, The Brute Man. At American International Pictures he photographed the horror satire How to Make a Monster, while at United Artists he lensed Invisible Invaders and The Four Skulls of Jonathan Drake. In 1959, he became the cinematographer on the television series Adventures in Paradise. His film work became far less frequent after 1960. Like many of his contemporaries, Gertsman finished his career working in television, on shows like Arthur Lubin's Mister Ed series (1961-66) for Filmways Television and most specifically for superstar Lucille Ball and her two subsequent sitcoms The Lucy Show (1962-68) and Here's Lucy (1968-74), the latter of which was produced under her own Lucille Ball Productions, Inc. banner.

== Credits ==
- Blonde Alibi (1946)
- Inside Job (1946)
- Gunfighters of Abilene (1960)
- Timbuktu (1959)
- How to Make a Monster (1958)
- Kelly and Me (1957)
- The Creature Walks Among Us (1956)
- Raw Edge (1956)
- Everything but the Truth (1956)
- Never Say Goodbye (1956)
- I've Lived Before (1956)
- The Spoilers (1955)
- To Hell and Back (1955)
- One Desire (1955)
- Bengal Brigade (1954)
- So This Is Paris (1954)
- Tanganyka (1954)
- The Glass Web (1953)
- All American (1953)
- The Golden Blade (1953)
- The Great Sioux Uprising (1953)
- Meet Me at the Fair (1953)
- It Grows on Trees (1952)
- Just Across the Street (1952)
- Red Ball Express (1952)
- Son of Ali Baba (1952)
- Meet Danny Wilson (1952)
- You Never Can Tell (1951)
- Double Crossbones (1951)
- Target Unknown (1951)
- Comanche Territory (1950)
- One Way Street (1950)
- Louisa (1950)
- City Across the River (1949)
- Johnny Stool Pigeon (1949)
- South Sea Sinner (1949)
- Rachel and the Stranger (1948)
- Time Out of Mind (1947)
- Terror by Night (1946)
- Girl on the Spot (1946)
