= Harry W. Gerstad =

American film editor (1909–2002)

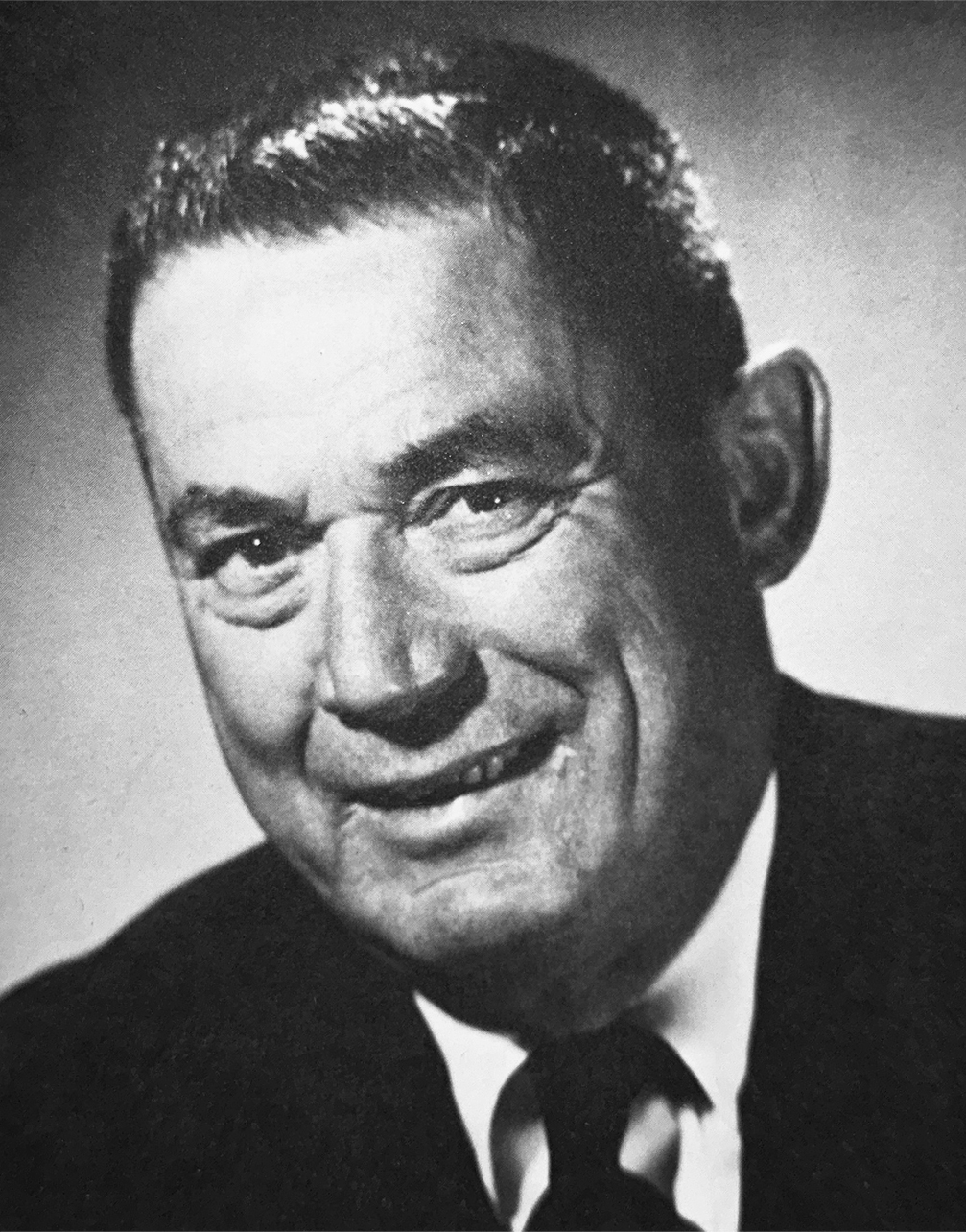
- Born: Harry Donald Gerstad; June 11, 1909
- Died: July 17, 2002
- Occupation(s): Film editor, director

Harry W. Gerstad (born Harry Donald Gerstad; June 11, 1909 – July 17, 2002) was an American film editor who sometimes directed films. The Academy Award-winning editor also worked on television. He edited as well as directed for the 1950s program Adventures of Superman. In the 1960s he worked for Bing Crosby Productions and Batjac Productions. Gerstad retired to Palm Springs, California in 1973 and lived there until his death in 2002.

== Awards and nominations ==
He won the Academy Award for Best Film Editing (the "Oscar") twice: for the boxing drama Champion in 1949 and for Fred Zinnemann's seminal Western High Noon in 1952. Elmo Williams, who was co-editor of High Noon, indicated in his autobiography that Gerstad's credit was a nominal one. At that time the editorial supervisor (Gerstad) was usually (and often contractually) given superior credit to subordinate editors (Williams), and one responsibility of Gerstad's position was selecting and hiring Williams, who only worked on this one Stanley Kramer production.

In 1997, Gerstad received the American Cinema Editors Career Achievement Award.

Gerstad was honored with a Palm Springs Walk of Stars Golden Palm Star in 2003.

== Filmography ==
=== Editor ===
- Brazil (film editor – not credited) 1944
- The Spiral Staircase (film editor) (1946)
- Till the End of Time (film editor) 1946
- Crossfire (film editor) (1947)
- So Well Remembered (film editor) 1947
- Unknown Island (film editor) 1948
- Champion (film editor) 1949
- Home of the Brave (film editor) 1949
- Tough Assignment (film editor) (1949)
- Gun Crazy (film editor) 1950
- The Men (film editor) 1950
- Rocketship X-M (film editor) (1950)
- Cyrano de Bergerac (film editor) 1950
- Death of a Salesman (editorial supervisor) 1951
- Eight Iron Men (editorial supervisor) 1952
- The Happy Time (editorial supervisor) 1952
- My Six Convicts (editorial supervisor) 1952
- The Sniper (editorial supervisor) 1952
- High Noon (editorial supervisor) 1952
- The Four Poster (editorial supervisor) 1952
- Combat Squad (film editor) 1953
- The 5,000 Fingers of Dr. T. (editorial supervisor) 1953
- The Juggler (editorial supervisor) 1953
- The Member of the Wedding (editorial supervisor) 1953
- Frontier Gun (film editor) 1958
- The Alligator People (supervising film editor) 1959
- Five Gates to Hell (supervising editor) 1959
- Here Come the Jets (supervising film editor) 1959
- The Rookie (supervising film editor) 1959
- Freckles (supervising film editor) 1960
- 13 Fighting Men (film editor) 1960
- Young Jesse James (film editor) 1960
- The Magic Sword (film editor) 1962
- Walk on the Wild Side (film editor) 1962
- Of Love and Desire (film editor) 1963
- Batman (film editor) (1966)
- The War Wagon (film editor) (1967)
- The Secret Life of an American Wife (film editor) 1968
- Hard Contract (film editor) 1969
- Cover Me Babe (film editor) 1970
- Big Jake (film editor) 1971
- Ben (film editor) 1972
- Walking Tall (film editor) (1973)
- Framed (film editor) 1975

=== Director ===
- 13 Fighting Men (director) (1960)
