= Combat Squad =

1953 film by Cy Roth

- Directed by: Cy Roth
- Written by: Wyott Ordung
- Produced by: Jerry Thomas
- Starring: John Ireland; Lon McCallister; Hal March
- Cinematography: Charles Van Enger
- Edited by: Harry W. Gerstad
- Music by: Paul Dunlap
- Production company: Columbia Pictures
- Distributed by: Columbia Pictures
- Release date: October 1, 1953
- Running time: 72 minutes
- Country: United States
- Language: English

Combat Squad is a 1953 American war film directed by Cy Roth and starring John Ireland, Lon McCallister and Hal March. It is set during the Korean War.

== Plot ==
Deployed during the Korean War, Sgt. Ken 'Fletch' Fletcher (John Ireland) is instructed to inspect an enemy-occupied ledge so that an observation post can be built. Following their sergeant's orders, a small platoon is sent forth, with one of the men being sent out to distract the opposing forces while he is equipped with a flamethrower. After successfully clearing out a cave entrance, the platoon is instructed to reinstate contact with Sgt. Wiley (Don Haggerty). However, after one of their members Marley (Myron Healey) is shot by an enemy combatant, they are forced to return fire—successfully—without Marley. Following their triumph, a radio transmission sends them back to camp where a small awarding ceremony commences.

Back at camp, Sgt. Gordon recruits another platoon before he instructs veteran fighters that they will be going on a night mission. When recovered from his leg injury, Sgt. Wiley helps increase morale, even though he would need assistance. Holding out until morning, Fletch is sent back to investigate a counterattack plan proposed by his regiment. Tasked with eliminating a sniper, a few men in the platoon become casualties after being spotted, which prompts Fletcher to return fire, knocking him out of a tree. Unbeknownst to them, the presence of more snipers leads Sgt. Gordon to kill the final one after his platoon plans briefly. Three men return alive.

== Cast ==
- John Ireland as Sgt. Ken 'Fletch' Fletcher
- Lon McCallister as Martin
- Hal March as Henry Gordon
- George E. Stone as Medic Brown
- Norman Leavitt as Fred Jones
- Myron Healey as Marley
- Don Haggerty as Sgt. Wiley
- Tristram Coffin as Captain Johnson
- David Holt as Garvin
- Dick Fortune as Kenson
- Robert Easton as Lewis
- Jill Hollingsworth as Yvonne
- Linda Danson as Anne
- Neva Gilbert as Virginia
- Eileen Howe as Patricia
- Dirk Evans as Heroic GI
- Paul Keast as Colonel
- Bob Peoples as Wounded GI

== Bibliography ==
- Paul M. Edwards. A Guide to Films on the Korean War. Greenwood Publishing Group, 1997.
