= Big Timber (1950 film) =

- Directed by: Jean Yarbrough
- Screenplay by: Warren Wilson
- Produced by: Lindsley Parsons
- Starring: Roddy McDowall; Jeff Donnell; Lyn Thomas; Gordon Jones; Tom Greenway; Robert Shayne; Ted Hecht; Lyle Talbot
- Cinematography: William A. Sickner
- Edited by: Ace Herman
- Production company: Monogram Pictures
- Distributed by: Monogram Pictures
- Release date: September 10, 1950
- Running time: 73 minutes
- Country: United States
- Language: English

Big Timber is a 1950 American action film directed by Jean Yarbrough and written by Warren Wilson. The film stars Roddy McDowall, Jeff Donnell, Lyn Thomas, Gordon Jones, Tom Greenway, Robert Shayne, Ted Hecht and Lyle Talbot. The film was released on September 10, 1950, by Monogram Pictures.

== Cast ==
- Roddy McDowall as Jimmy
- Jeff Donnell as Sally
- Lyn Thomas as June
- Gordon Jones as Jocko
- Tom Greenway as Rocky
- Robert Shayne as Dixon
- Ted Hecht as Bert
- Lyle Talbot as Logger #1
