= Neva Gilbert =

American model (1929–2022)

Playboy centerfold appearance
- July 1954
- Preceded by: Margie Harrison
- Succeeded by: Arline Hunter

Personal details
- Born: September 1, 1929; New York City, U.S.
- Died: November 12, 2022 (aged 93); Lake Worth, Florida, U.S.
- Height: 5 ft 6 in (1.68 m)

Neva A. Gilbert (September 1, 1929 – November 12, 2022) was an American model. She was Playboy magazine's Playmate of the Month for its July 1954 issue.

== Early life ==
Gilbert was born in New York City and started work at Sears and Roebuck by lying about her age in order to be eligible. She was married at age 16 and divorced within a few years.

== Career ==
After moving to California Gilbert began modeling, and her acting roles included working with Marilyn Monroe. When Playboy was launched, it did not commission its own photo sessions. Gilbert's photos were actually taken by a private photographer, Tom Kelley, the same photographer who photographed Monroe and who sold Gilbert's photos to the Baumgarth Calendar Company. Hugh Hefner bought her photos, (along with the photos of many other models), and, unbeknownst to Gilbert, published them. Gilbert was the seventh playmate in the first year playmates appeared in Playboy magazine.

According to Gilbert,

In those days, I was an aspiring actress. I'd go on assignments with Marilyn Monroe. We did some calendar shots for a photographer named Tom Kelley. A few months later, I heard the pictures had appeared in a new magazine called Playboy, but I couldn't find a copy. I didn't see my centerfold until this year.

— Neva Gilbert, Playboy, December 1979

Gilbert had small parts in two films: Combat Squad (1953) and The Country Girl (1954). She also appeared in various off-Broadway and college theatre productions, especially the plays of Tennessee Williams. Decades later, she returned to Playboy and posed semi-nude for a feature called, "Playmates Forever!", in the December 1979 issue.

== Later life and death ==
By 2017 Gilbert was the oldest Playmate, and told an ABC News reporter that she was still looking for work.

Gilbert died in Lake Worth, Florida on November 12, 2022, at the age of 93.

== Filmography ==
- The Country Girl (1954) as Lady
- Combat Squad (1953) as Virginia

== See also ==
- List of people in Playboy 1953–59

Margie Harrison	Margaret Scott	Dolores Del Monte	Marilyn Waltz	Joanne Arnold	Margie Harrison
Neva Gilbert	Arline Hunter	Jackie Rainbow	Madeline Castle	Diane Hunter	Terry Ryan
