= The Four Skulls of Jonathan Drake =

- Theatrical release poster
- Directed by: Edward L. Cahn
- Written by: Orville H. Hampton
- Produced by: Robert Kent
- Starring: Eduard Franz; Valerie French; Henry Daniell; Grant Richards; Paul Cavanagh
- Cinematography: Maury Gertsman
- Edited by: Edward Mann
- Music by: Paul Dunlap
- Production company: Premium Pictures
- Distributed by: United Artists
- Release date: 1959
- Running time: 70 minutes
- Country: United States
- Language: English

The Four Skulls of Jonathan Drake is a 1959 American black-and-white horror film written by Orville H. Hampton and directed by Edward L. Cahn. It was one of a series of films they made in the late 1950s for producer Robert E. Kent on contract for distribution by United Artists. The film stars Eduard Franz, Valerie French, Grant Richards, and Henry Daniell. Set in the present day (i.e. 1959), it tells the story of a curse placed on the Drake Family by the witch doctor of the Jivaro, a tribe of indigenous people in Ecuador, following a 19th century massacre led by Capt. Wilfred Drake. Since that time, for three generations, all the Drake men have died at age 60, after which they were decapitated, and their heads shrunken by persons unknown.

The film was released by United Artists on May 15, 1959, on a double bill with Invisible Invaders (1959) The film was made as a package deal with Invisible Invaders.

== Plot ==
While contemplating a shrunken head, professor Jonathan Drake has a vision of three floating skulls. Recoiling in fear, he instructs his daughter Alison to dispatch a telegram to his 60-year-old brother Kenneth, saying he will visit Kenneth on Thursday.

But before Jonathan can arrive, Kenneth sees a shrunken head outside his window. A tall man with long hair and lips sewn closed pokes Kenneth with a bamboo stiletto, barely breaking the skin. Kenneth dies. The man, Zutai, attempts to behead Kenneth but is interrupted.

Police Lt. Jeff Rowan is called. He meets Dr. George Bradford - Kenneth's physician - and archaeologist Dr. Emil Zurich, a friend of Kenneth's. Not knowing of the attack on Kenneth, Bradford determines the cause of death of be cardiovascular disease. Apparently, three generations of Drake men have died from cardiac problems at age 60. Jeff asks if there is a connection between the shrunken head and the death. Bradford does not think so. However, Zurich, apparently not saddened by Kenneth's demise, proudly calls the shrunken head a "particularly fine specimen."

At Kenneth's, Jonathan learns of his death and demands that his closed coffin be opened. The body inside has no head. Zutai took it to Zurich, who calls it "payment for the evils of your ancestors" and starts shrinking it. He says once he has Jonathan's head, "the curse will be finished."

At the family crypt, Jonathan tells Alison that all the Drake men are entombed there except Capt. Wilfred Drake, who in 1873 led an expedition to Ecuador. There, the Jivaro tribe killed Wlifred's "Swiss agent" and as revenge, Wilfred massacred the Jivaro. The tribal witch doctor, Zutai, cursed the male Drakes. Wilfred died at 60. So did each Drake in the crypt, where each body is headless. The crypt's locked closet contains two skulls. Neither he nor Alison know how they got there.

Zurich sends Zutai to the crypt to deposit the third skull, Kenneth's. Meanwhile, Jeff is skeptical about the curse. At the crypt, Alison and Jeff discover the third skull. Zutai attacks Jonathan, poking him, but is again interrupted and cannot behead him. Seeing Zutai fleeing, Jeff shoots at him, to no avail. Bradford declares Jonathan dead. But Jeff has a sample of Jonathan's blood analyzed at the crime lab, where Lee Coulter finds curare in it. Jeff tells Bradford to administer an antidote, which revives Jonathan. He has another vision of floating skulls, but instead of seeing three, he sees four.

Lee dusts the three skulls in the crypt for fingerprints. The prints are the same person's - even though Jonathan's grandfather, father and brother died many years apart - and each print contains a tiny picture of a skull. Alison clears up the tiny skull mystery by showing Jeff a book about "The Cult of Headless Men", who achieved immortality and branded their fingertips with images of skulls. As the immortals needed no food or oxygen, they had their lips sewn closed.

Jeff goes to Zurich's to interview him, despite still discounting his suggestion of supernatural involvement. After Jeff leaves, Zurich and Zutai go off to kill Jonathan. But they cannot, as Jonathan has been taken to hospital after again seeing four skulls. Jeff surreptitiously returns to Zurich's house, finds his secret laboratory, and discovers Dr. Bradford's head. Bradford had gone to Zurich's to discuss the unusual occurrences.

Lee discovers that Zurich was the "Swiss agent" on the 1873 expedition but somehow still lives. Zurich kidnaps Alison. Displaying the now-shrunken head of Bradford, he says Jonathan is next. Jonathan leaves the hospital and, arming himself, goes to Zurich's lab. He reveals that Zurich is a creature with a "white" head attached to a "brown" Jivaro body. Jonathan raises his revolver to his head to kill himself so that his soul will escape from his skull, thus breaking the curse.

Jonathan and Zutai grapple for the pistol. Jeff bursts in and during a fight flings Zutai into an open flame. Zutai explodes. Having Zutai's curare-laden stiletto, Jonathan tells Jeff to poke Zurich with it. Jeff complies and Zurich dies. Jonathan decapitates Zurich, forever ending the curse. Zurich's body turns to dust, leaving behind the intact fourth skull.

== Cast ==
- Eduard Franz as Jonathan Drake
- Valerie French as Alison Drake
- Grant Richards as Lt. Jeff Rowan
- Henry Daniell as Dr. Emil Zurich
- Lumsden Hare as Rogers
- Howard Wendell as Dr. George Bradford
- Paul Wexler as Zutai
- Paul Cavanaugh as Kenneth Drake
- Frank Gerstle as Lee Coulter

== Production ==
The Four Skulls of Jonathan Drake was produced at Paramount Sunset Studios during early November 1958. It was copyrighted by Vogue Pictures on 8 May 1959.

The poster for the US theatrical release is headlined "Written, Produced and Directed To Scare The Daylights Out Of You!"

== Distribution ==
In the US, the film was shown on its opening day, May 15, 1959 at, for example, the Kingston Federal Theater in Kingston NY on a double feature with Invisible Invaders. It played later in 1959, as a "new first showing", at the Monroe Theater in the Chicago Loop starting on September 3 of that year. The film was on the drive-in theater circuit a few years later. It ran at the Hi-Way Drive-In Theater in Ft. Lauderdale FL on August 2, 1963 as part of what was advertised as "4 Horror Hits 4" and "The Fright Show of the Year". The complete program was, in order, The Screaming Skull (1958), The Brain Eaters (1959), The Four Skulls of Jonathan Drake, and Brainwashed (1960).

For its UK theatrical release, The Four Skulls of Jonathan Drake was assigned an X-certificate by the British Board of Film Censors on 23 April 1959. At the time, this meant that the film could not be shown to anyone under the age of 16.

Following its theatrical release, the film went into US television syndication as part of United Artist Association's 58-title "Science Fiction-Horror-Monster Features" package, which was released to TV stations on May 15, 1963. It became a "staple on the late-night [TV] circuit", as well as being shown during the day more than a decade after its initial theatrical release; e.g. on WNEW-TV in New York City at 1:30 pm ET on Saturday May 3. 1975.

The Four Skulls of Jonathan Drake has been revived for individual theatrical showings in the 21st century. It ran on October 30, 2014 as part of "The Thursday Horror Picture Show" series at the Carolina Asheville Theater in Asheville NC and as a double feature with The Black Sleep (1956) at the Bristol Historical Society in Bristol CT on April 28 and 29, 2017 as a benefit fund-raiser for BHS.

=== Home media ===
Shout Factory first issued the film as a DVD double feature with Voodoo Island (1957) on September 20, 2005. On October 1, 2013, the same company released The Four Skulls of Jonathan Drake as one of the feature films on its "Horror 4 You: Timeless Horror" boxed DVD set, which also includes The Face of Marble (1946), The Snake Woman (1961), and I Bury the Living (1958). Shout Factory again released the film as a single Blu-ray on June 27, 2017.

== Reception ==
A contemporary review in BoxOffice magazine is rather lukewarm. The anonymous reviewer notes that "There are enough frightening shots of skulls and head-shrinking in this Vogue Pictures programmer to satisfy avid horror fans in the neighborhood and action houses." The review says that Cahn "gets the required shudders from the material at hand, especially the closeups of poisoned stilettos in the necks of the victims." The sources consulted on a weekly basis by BoxOffice did not find The Four Skulls of Jonathan Drake to be a particularly good film. BoxOffice itself, Film Daily, the Hollywood Reporter, and the New York Daily News all rated it as "fair," while Harrison's Reports, Variety, and Parents' Magazine called it "poor."

Modern-day critic Bryan Senn finds considerable fault with the film, writing that it "comes with a distasteful whiff of bigotry. 'The head of a decapitated white man on the body of a jungle Indian', observes [Jonathan] with distaste, as if disgusted by this absurdly literal form of miscegenation." He calls the movie a "dull programmer" with a "morbid script" and actors who are "alternately incompetent and disinterested," describing French's character as "simple and shallow" and Daniell as looking "sour and bored."

Along similar lines, in The Zombie Movie Encyclopedia, academic Peter Dendle sees Zurich as a metaphor for the "awkward blend of native Indian and European" and Zutai as "a walking parable of the silenced and subservient New World slave," but one who is nonetheless "more enigmatic and compelling than Zurich." Dendle also writes of Zutai that "Though fully sentient and emotive as far as we can tell, he doesn't exhibit any volition independently of Zurich's orders. Curiously, though, he does explode when kicked into a fire.".

British critic Phil Hardy is more favorable about the film. He calls it a "preposterous but lively confection," and notes that "Cahn's direction is pedestrian, but he manipulates the paraphernalia of skulls and shrunken heads to eerie effect, while Daniell and Wexler (the latter's zombie unnervingly possessing the sewn lips of a shrunken head) made superbly sinister presences."

Wheeler Winston Dixon, in A History of Horror, is also favorable. He writes that the film is one of a number made during the 1950s that "managed to sneak through the cracks of the country's postwar complacency, all of them sharing an air of claustrophobic fatalism," something enhanced by The Four Skulls of Jonathan Drake having been shot in "moody black and white on a few spartan sets." He also points out that "What sets Four Skulls apart is Cahn's absolute seriousness in the film's execution."

Leonard Maltin gives the film 2 out of 4 stars, describing it as "Acceptable horror fare involving centuries-old voodoo curse upon family and contemporary scientist who puts an end to the weird goings-on." Film historians Ted Okuda and Mark Yurkiw give the movie the same rating, but instead of stars, award it 2 of 4 skulls. They note that "The low-budget thriller made a stronger impact on impressionable young minds back in the day, but it remains acceptably creepy fare."

Craig Butler of Allmovie.com is disappointed in The Four Skulls of Jonathan Drake. He writes that Cahn "maintains an eerie, slightly disturbed atmosphere" with a "dependable performance from Henry Daniell and the unique 'mouth sewn shut' disfigurement of his henchman." The director's "maintenance of atmosphere is good, but it comes at the expense of lively pacing and the ability to build tension and suspense." Butler concludes that the movie "ends up a fairly dull film." The Allmovie website gives it 2 of 5 stars; a "user rating" based on two votes awards it a slightly better 2½ stars of a possible 5.

== See also ==
- List of American films of 1959
