= Timbuktu (1959 film) =

1959 US adventure film by Jacques Tourneur

- Original film poster
- Directed by: Jacques Tourneur
- Written by: Paul Dudley; Anthony Veiller
- Produced by: Edward Small
- Starring: Victor Mature; Yvonne De Carlo
- Cinematography: Maury Gertsman
- Music by: Gerald Fried
- Production company: Imperial Pictures
- Distributed by: United Artists
- Release date: November 22, 1959
- Running time: 91 minutes
- Country: United States
- Language: English

Timbuktu is a 1959 American black-and-white adventure film directed by Jacques Tourneur and starring Victor Mature and Yvonne De Carlo. It is set in Timbuktu (Africa), but was filmed in the Coral Pink Sand Dunes State Park in Kanab, Utah.

== Plot ==
In 1940, France is at war with Germany. The French have removed large numbers of troops from their African possessions, leaving the way open for revolt. American soldier of fortune Mike Conway (Victor Mature) sees a chance to pay his way back to the United States by running guns to hostile Tuaregs.

Wearing a slouch hat and bush jacket, Conway is armed with a Thompson submachine gun and a wristwatch with an alarm engraved "From Conway to Conway". He finds himself walking a razor's edge between an anti-French Tuareg leader (John Dehner) keen for Conway's supply of weapons but keener to use his tarantulas on his prisoners, a moderate imam (Leonard Mudie) wanting peace, the local French Foreign Legion commander (George Dolenz), and the commander's attractive wife (Yvonne De Carlo) who Conway cannot keep away from.

== Cast ==
- Victor Mature as Mike Conway
- Yvonne De Carlo as Natalie Dufort
- George Dolenz as Colonel Charles Dufort
- John Dehner as Emir Bhaki aka The Lion of the Desert
- Marcia Henderson as Jeanne Marat
- Robert Clarke as Captain Girard
- Paul Wexler as Suleyman
- James Foxx as Lt. Victor Marat
- Leonard Mudie as Mohomet Adani

Turkish actor Feridun Çölgeçen was credited as technical adviser. Fred Carson acted as both stuntman and Victor Mature's stand-in.

== Production ==
The film was originally meant to be shot on location in colour and widescreen based on an idea of Small and Frank Cavett with Stuart Heisler to direct. Later, there was a script done by Horace McCoy. At one stage, the film was going to be made by the team of Clarence Greene and Russell Rouse, who were making films for Small.

In 1956 producer Edward Small registered several titles for the film, including: East of Timbuktu, West of Timbuktu, North of Timbuktu, South of Timbuktu (a technique of titling films that William Witney described as "boxing the compass"), The Road to Timbuktu, and Timbuktu Theme. However, he eventually settled on the plain title Timbuktu. In 1957, Anthony Veillier signed to write a script.

Mature signed in February 1958. Filming started May 1958 in Kanab, Utah. Parts of the film were shot in the Coral Pink Sand Dunes State Park.

Director Jacques Tourneur claimed that producer Small thought the film was not long enough so he inserted reaction shots of close-ups of various actors all throughout the film.

Edward Small felt so embarrassed by the film that he removed his name from the final credits.

== Reception and legacy ==
Writer and actor Jacques Lourcelles considers Timbuktu to be one of director Jacques Tourneur's very best films.
