= The Angry Red Planet =

1959 American film by Ib Melchior

- Theatrical release poster
- Directed by: Ib Melchior
- Screenplay by: Sidney W. Pink; Ib Melchior
- Story by: Sidney W. Pink
- Produced by: Sidney W. Pink; Norman Maurer
- Starring: Gerald Mohr; Naura Hayden; Jack Kruschen; Les Tremayne
- Cinematography: Stanley Cortez
- Edited by: Ivan J. Hoffman
- Music by: Paul Dunlap
- Production company: Sino Productions
- Distributed by: American International Pictures
- Release date: September 8, 1960
- Running time: 83-87 minutes
- Country: United States
- Language: English
- Budget: $200,000

The Angry Red Planet (also called Invasion of Mars and Journey to Planet Four) is a 1960 American science-fiction film directed by Ib Melchior and starring Gerald Mohr and Les Tremayne. It was filmed in 1959, and was released on September 8, 1960 on a double bill with Beyond the Time Barrier. It also played in some areas with Circus of Horrors (1960).

Filming for The Angry Red Planet began on September 9, 1959, at Hal Roach Studios in Culver City, California, only a month after Ib Melchior and Sid Pink completed their final draft of the screenplay. Melchior reportedly had an initial production budget of only $200,000 and was given just nine days to film it. Such financial and time constraints necessitated the use of "CineMagic", a film-processing technique that combined hand-drawn animations with live-action footage. The relatively inexpensive process was used for all scenes depicting the surface of Mars. While CineMagic proved unsatisfactory for creating visually believable special effects for The Angry Red Planet, producer Norman Maurer did reuse the process in 1962, although to a lesser extent, in the comedy film The Three Stooges in Orbit.

== Plot ==
Mission control personnel on Earth monitor the rocket ship Mars Rocket 1 (MR-1) as it approaches Earth orbit following the first crewed expedition to Mars. Personnel are surprised to see the ship on their monitors, for they believed that the vehicle had become lost or destroyed in space. Ground technicians are unable, though, to make contact with anyone on MR-1, so they guide the rocket by remote control to a safe Nevada landing. Only two survivors of the original four-person crew are found in the ship: Dr. Iris Ryan and Col. Tom O'Bannion, whose entire right arm is covered with a strange green alien growth. The MR-1's mission to Mars is then recounted by Dr. Ryan as she also helps to find a cure for Col. O'Bannion's badly infected arm. In her debriefing, she reports in detail the crew's experiences while traveling to the red planet and exploring its surface. She describes their expedition in retrospect, as if it were currently happening.

After MR-1 reaches Mars and its crew explores the planet's surface, Dr. Ryan is attacked by a carnivorous plant, which Chief Warrant Officer Jacobs kills with his freeze-ray, which he calls "Cleo". The crew then encounters an immense creature resembling a rat/bat/spider/crab hybrid, at first mistaking its legs for trees. That creature is also blinded and repelled by Jacobs, who again uses his ray gun. When the crew returns to their ship, they realize that their radio signals are being blocked and the MR-1 is unable to leave Mars due to a mysterious force field.

O'Bannion next leads the crew to a Martian lake, where a city with high, impressive structures is visible on the other side, far in the distance. Crossing the water in an inflatable raft, they are stopped by a giant amoeba-like creature with a single spinning eye. They hurriedly retreat, the creature pursuing them. As they are entering their ship, the creature catches Jacobs and draws him inside its gelatinous body, soon absorbing him; it has also infected O'Bannion's arm. The creature envelops the ship and is expected to eventually develop acids to eat through it.

O'Bannion leads them in rewiring the ship to electrify the outer hull, which drives the creature away after destroying parts of it, then they rewire the ship for lift-off. The three survivors manage to lift MR-1 off from the planet, since the force field has somehow been deactivated, but Professor Gettell, the MR-1's designer, dies of an apparent heart attack caused by the extreme stresses of the ascent.

Once the MR-1 returns to Earth, O'Bannion's infected arm is cured by medical staff using electric shocks. Mission-control technicians also examine the MR-1's data recorders from the expedition and find a recording of an alien voice, which announces that the ship's crew was allowed to leave Mars so that they could deliver a message to their home planet. The voice then states, "We of Mars have been observing human development on Earth for many thousands of years and have determined that humanity's technology has far outpaced progress in cultural advancement." The alien then accuses humankind of invading Mars, warning that if future expeditions ever return to the red planet, the Earth would be destroyed in retaliation.

== Cast ==
- Gerald Mohr as Colonel Thomas O'Bannion
- Naura Hayden as Dr. Iris "Irish" Ryan
- Les Tremayne as Professor Theodore Gettell
- Jack Kruschen as Chief Warrant Officer Sam Jacobs
- Paul Hahn as Major General George Treegar
- J. Edward McKinley as Professor Paul Weiner
- Tom Daly as Dr. Frank Gordon
- Don Lamond as TV Newscaster/Martian Voice
- Edward Innes as Brigadier General Alan Prescott
- Gordon Barnes as Major Lyman Ross
- Jack Haddock a Lt. Colonel Davis
- Brandy Bryan as Nurse Hayes
- Joan Fitzpatrick as Nurse Dixon
- Arline Hunter as Joan (not in 83 minute version)
- Alean Hamilton as Joan's Friend (not in 83 minute version)

== Production ==
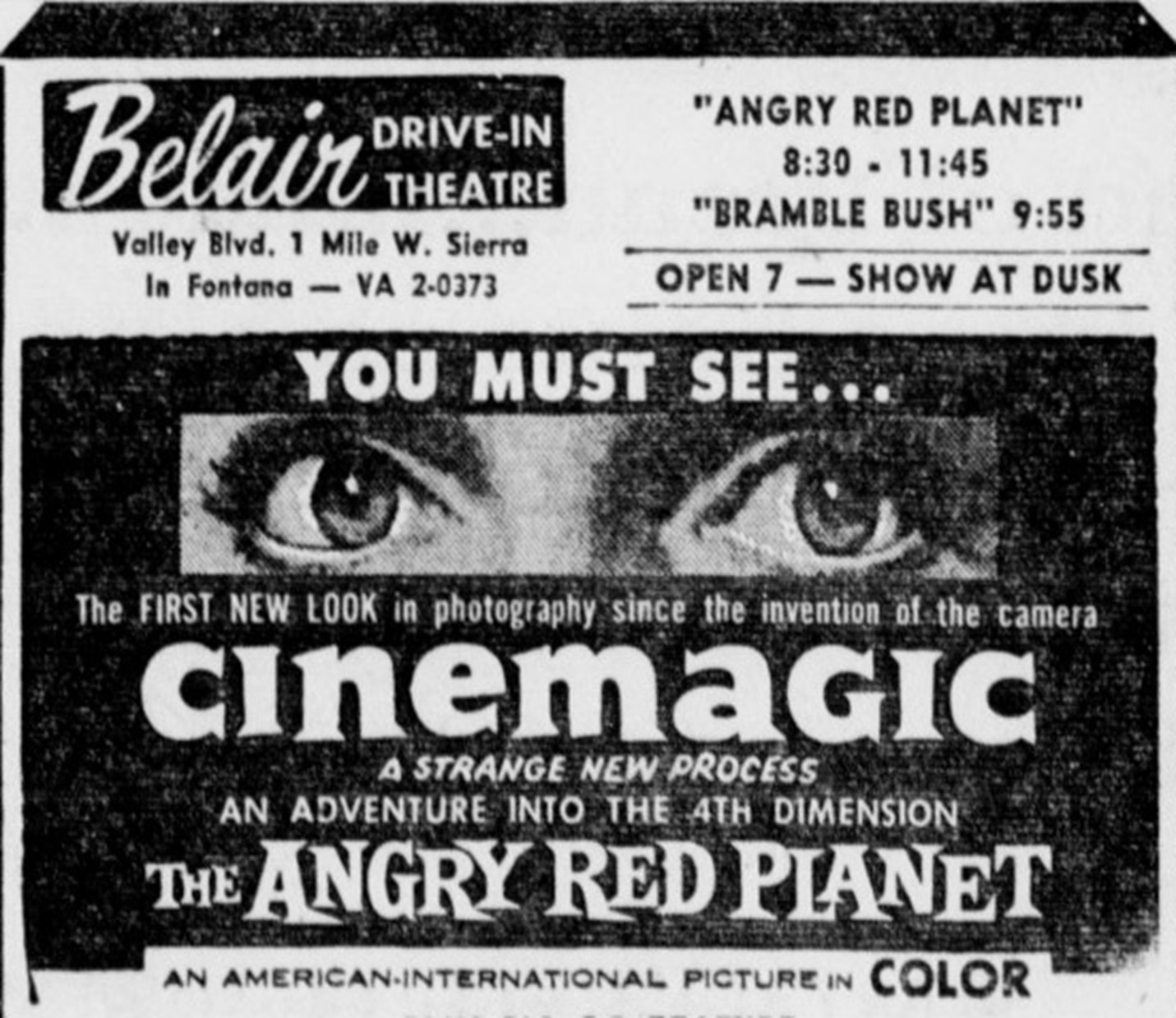
Drive-in advertisement from 1960

The Angry Red Planet began as The Planet Mars, a treatment written by Sidney Pink about a space voyage to Earth's mysterious neighbor. Pink said in an interview a few years before his 2002 death: "It was written on my kitchen table. My kids were my critics, they'd tell me what was good and what just fell flat". Pink gave his treatment to Melchior after meeting him at a party. Melchior believed the project had potential, so he offered to help write the screenplay if Pink allowed him to direct the film. While Melchior worked on establishing a working script, Pink met Maurer, who was developing CineMagic, a "revolutionary" filming process for creating special effects by combining hand-drawn images with live action. However, it soon became apparent the process would not be able to deliver what had been promised with respect to the quality of its effects. Pink recalled that "the damn Cinemagic didn't work like it should. It was supposed to be sort of a 3-D effect. What we came up with was great anyway".

The production budget for The Angry Red Planet may have actually been significantly higher than the $200,000 cited by most film and press references. In its online catalog, the American Film Institute refers to a contemporary report in The Hollywood Reporter that announced an increase in allotted funding for the project more than double the frequently given figure. AFI states: "As noted in a HR news item, just prior to the start of production, the film's budget was raised from $250,000 to $500,000".

Comments made by Pink on the eve of filming provide some evidence regarding how little money was spent to design and build sets for the production. In an interview for a September 7, 1959, news item by Associated Press reporter and writer James Bacon, Pink is quoted about the extreme cost-cutting effectiveness of using the new CineMagic process: "Our set for the planet Mars cost us a couple of hundred dollars instead of the thousands we had estimated". Pink also estimates in that interview that the movie "will be made at half the original cost", confirming that Invasion of Mars (the film's working title before its release) was a low-budget project. The "meager" $200,000 production budget cited for The Angry Red Planet may, therefore, be a credible ballpark figure.

=== CineMagic ===
The CineMagic process was used to cast a red glow over scenes depicting the surface of Mars. The low-cost process made the actors look similar to cartoon drawings so they would fit in with low-budget, less realistic sets and props.

To achieve this effect, a black-and-white film negative was first processed with solarisation (a process which partially reverses the negative, making some areas of the image appear positive). The resulting film was then tinted red. Making a film positive was not necessary. At the time The Angry Red Planet was produced, black-and-white film cost less than color film and processing. The combination of using black-and-white film for all scenes depicting Mars and not needing to produce a film positive lowered production costs for the film.

== Release ==
American International Pictures released the film on September 8, 1960 with its original running time varying between 83 and 87 minutes. AIP distributed the film initially as part of double feature billings. In some regions, it was presented with Beyond the Time Barrier (1960) and in other regions, it was shown with Circus of Horrors (1960).

According to Sid Pink, he had trouble working with AIP, more specifically with the "notorious" Samuel Z. Arkoff. In a 2005 interview about the release of The Angry Red Planet, Pink said that "neither of us trusted the other, which worked out well because I wouldn't touch him with a 10-foot pole. Jimmy Nicholson was the brains of that operation. With Arkoff, you never got a straight count".

== Reception ==
The Angry Red Planet received mixed reviews upon its release. The New York Times film critic Eugene Archer gave the production a negative review, criticizing its depiction of the planet Mars, likening it to "a cardboard illustration from Flash Gordon". However, not all reviewers in 1959 and early 1960 were critical of the film in general, or in particular, CineMagic's deficiencies in simulating the terrain, fictitious plant life, and monstrous creatures on Mars.

Motion Picture Daily reviewer Samuel D. Berns was enthusiastic at the time about the production, calling it "a stimulating experience in suspense and intrigue". He describes CineMagic in his review as "a well-conceived optical effect for dramatic impact", an element of the film that he predicts will draw "big gross business" to the box office. Berns also compliments both forms of filming presented in The Angry Red Planet, as well as its music:

Everything seen or experienced outside the space ship on Mars is depicted in the Cinemagic process to symbolize a concept of nature on another planet. The rest of the film's action and background is printed in the normal fashion. ...Stanley Cortez delivered an expert job of camerawork, in marking the debut of the new Eastman 5250 Color, bringing into sharp focus the soft, effective color tones of the film. Paul Dunlap's music contributed its share of mounting interest and suspense in the subject matter for the producers Sid Pink and Norman Maurer.

In his 2001 reassessment of The Angry Red Planet, Glenn Erickson of DVD Talk criticizes the film's flat direction, dull script, and overuse of stock footage. Erickson does faintly compliment the film for at least coloring scenes of Mars' surface with a red tinge, which in his opinion gives the sequences "a credibly alien look". In his 2014 movie guide, Leonard Maltin judges the film to be only average, awarding it 2 out of 4 stars. However, reviewer Bruce Eder of AllMovie is more positive in his appraisal of the film, commending in particular its overall style of direction:

Danish-born director/screenwriter Ib Melchior brings a surprisingly light, deft touch to the proceedings, allowing the actors a chance to have fun with their roles—especially Gerald Mohr, still looking and sounding a bit like Humphrey Bogart, as the stalwart mission commander, and Jack Kruschen as the good-humored technician in the crew—without losing sight of the adventure and the story line, and meshing it all seamlessly with the special effects-driven sequences.

== Legacy ==
The cover artwork for the 1982 album Walk Among Us by the American punk rock band Misfits features the rat-bat-spider creature from The Angry Red Planet. The creature was also featured briefly in the Iron Maiden music video for "The Number of the Beast".

== Home media ==
The Angry Red Planet was first released on VHS by Thorn EMI/HBO Video. It was later released on VHS and DVD by MGM Home Entertainment in 2001, as part of their "Midnite Movies" line of home media releases. A decade later, MGM re-issued the film on DVD as part of the multi-feature "Midnite Movies" single-disc collection, which also includes the 1951 film The Man from Planet X, the 1985 film Morons from Outer Space, and the 1988 film Alien from L.A.. The Angry Red Planet was released yet again in 2013 by Gaiam International on Sci-Fi Classics, another four-movie compilation on a single disc, alongside The Man from Planet X, Beyond the Time Barrier (1960), and The Time Travelers (1964).

== See also ==
- List of American films of 1959
- List of films set on Mars
