= Robert Strauss (actor) =

American actor (1913–1975)

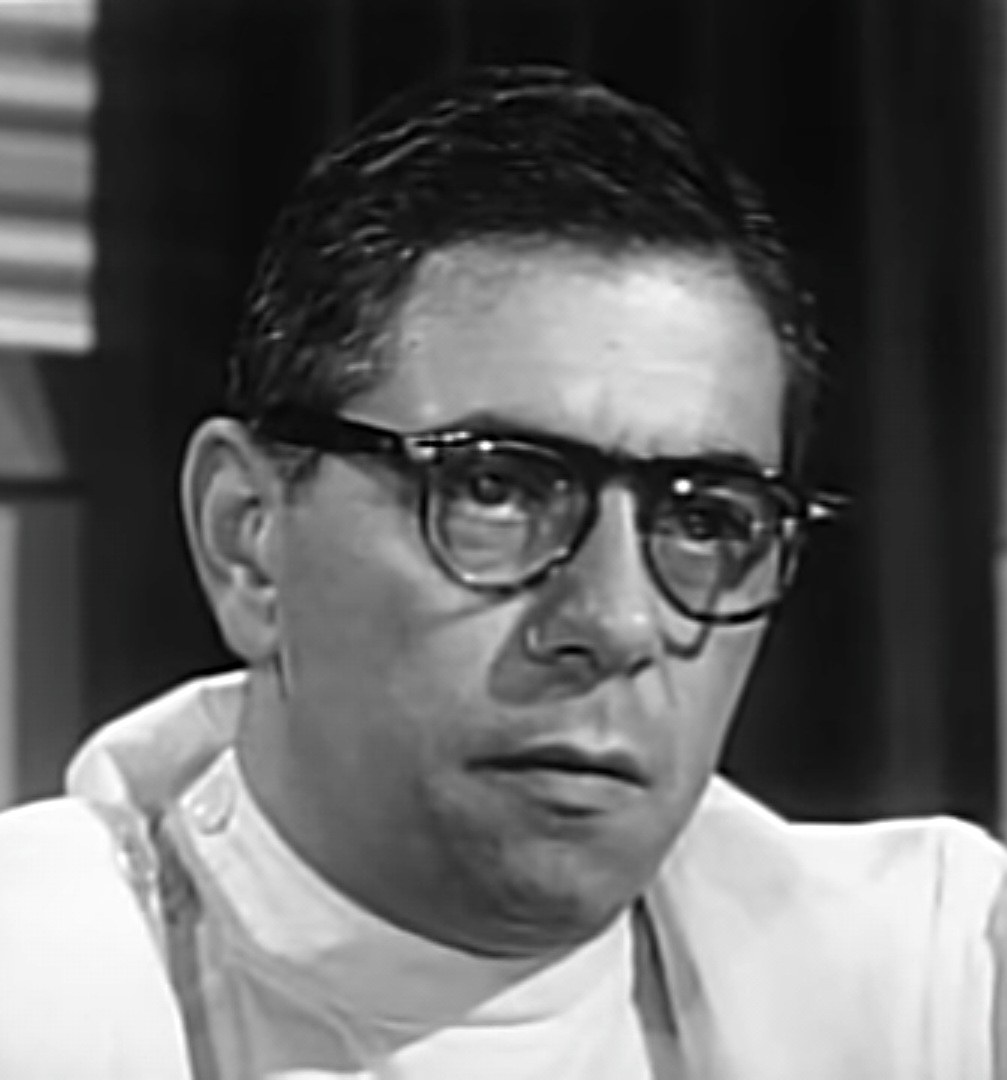
- Strauss in an episode of Medic (1955)
- Born: November 8, 1913; New York City, U.S.
- Died: February 20, 1975 (aged 61); New York City, U.S.
- Occupation: Actor
- Years active: 1930–1968
- Spouses: Audrey Bratty (m. 1951; div. 1960) Virginia Deeb (m. 1961)
- Children: 3 (with Bratty)

Robert Strauss (November 8, 1913 – February 20, 1975) was an American actor. He became most familiar in Hollywood films of the 1950s such as Stalag 17 (1953), for which he was nominated for an Academy Award in the category of Best Supporting Actor.

== Career ==
Strauss began his career as a classical actor, appearing in Twelfth Night and Macbeth on Broadway in 1930. Comedy became his specialty, and he was known best as Stalag 17's Stanislas "Animal" Kuzawa, a role he created in the original 1951 Broadway production and reprised in the 1953 film adaptation, for which he was nominated for an Academy Award for Best Supporting Actor.

His comic characters included a maniac called "Jack the Slasher" in the 1953 Bob Hope comedy film Here Come the Girls and Daisy Mae's cretinous cousin Romeo Scragg in the 1959 musical comedy Li'l Abner, based on the Broadway show. He also was featured in the 1955 Marilyn Monroe comedy film The Seven Year Itch.

In more serious parts, Strauss appeared in the 1956 war film Attack! with Jack Palance, Eddie Albert and Lee Marvin. He also had an important supporting role in the 1955 drama The Man with the Golden Arm.

Additional Broadway credits include Detective Story, Twentieth Century, and Portofino. Following his appearance in the latter, Strauss went on to character roles in The Bridges at Toko-Ri and Wake Me When It's Over as well as a number of low-budget films for producers like Albert Zugsmith.

Strauss became familiar to television viewers through his appearances in The Beverly Hillbillies, Bonanza, The Monkees, and a recurring role on Bewitched as conniving private investigator Charlie Leach, who was one of the few mortals who knew Samantha was a witch. He also appeared on The Alfred Hitchcock Hour, The Phil Silvers Show, Straightaway, Green Acres, The Dick van Dyke Show, The Man from U.N.C.L.E., Get Smart and Rango. He played a goldfish-poking bad guy who was a murder victim in the 1959 Perry Mason episode, "The Case of the Dangerous Dowager." He also appeared on Wagon Train in 1959 in the role of Count Roberto de Falcone in S3 E5 "The Elizabeth McQueeny Story" opposite Bette Davis in the title role.

In 1960, he played outlaw and casino owner "Howard C. Smith" in S3E11 of Gene Barry's TV Western Bat Masterson, intent on killing all witnesses to his guilty son's murder trail, Bat being the last.

He played Pete Kamboly in a 1965 episode "The Case of the Thermal Thief." His final film consisted of a solo performance in the experimental feature The Noah.

Strauss was a familiar voice in not a few radio dramas from the 1930s to the 1950s. His recurring roles included "Pa Wiggs" in the soap opera Mrs. Wiggs of the Cabbage Patch (1936–1938) and "Lively," a miner, in the 15-minute serial Our Gal Sunday that was broadcast on CBS from 1937 to 1959.

== Personal life ==
Strauss was Jewish. He was first married to Audrey Bratty from 1951 to 1960. They had three children, Deena, Deja and David. After their divorce in 1960, he married Virginia Deeb the following year and remained with her until his death.

== Death ==
Strauss was incapacitated during the final years of his life from the effects of multiple bouts of electroshock therapy applied to combat depression. He then suffered a paralyzing stroke. He died from an additional stroke on February 20, 1975 at the New York University Hospital.

== Partial filmography ==
Year	Film	Role
1950	The Sleeping City	Police Lt. Barney Miller (uncredited)
1952	Sailor Beware	CPO Lardoski
1952	Jumping Jacks	Sgt. McClusky
1953	The Redhead from Wyoming	'Knuckles' Hogan
1953	Stalag 17	Sgt. Stanislas 'Animal' Kuzawa
1953	Here Come the Girls	Jack the Slasher
1953	Act of Love	Sgt. Johnny Blackwood
1953	Money from Home	Seldom Seen Kid
1954	The Atomic Kid	Stan Cooper
1954	The Bridges at Toko-Ri	Beer Barrel
1955	The Seven Year Itch	Mr. Kruhulik
1955	The Man with the Golden Arm	Schwiefka
1956	Attack!	Pfc. Bernstein
1958	Frontier Gun	Yubo
1959	I Mobster	Black Frankie Udino
1959	Inside the Mafia	Sam Galey
1959	Perry Mason	Danny Barker
1959	4D Man	Roy Parker
1959	Li'l Abner!	Romeo Scragg
1960	Wake Me When It's Over	Sgt. Sam Weiscoff
1960	September Storm	Ernie Williams
1961	Dondi	Sammy Boy
1961	The Last Time I Saw Archie	MSgt. Stanley Erlenheim
1961	Twenty Plus Two	Jimmy Honsinger
1961	The George Raft Story	Frenchie
1962	Girls! Girls! Girls!	Sam (owner, Pirate's Den)
1963	The Thrill of It All	Chief truck driver
1963	The Wheeler Dealers	Feinberg, taxi driver
1964	Stage to Thunder Rock	Bob Acres
1965	Harlow	Hank
1965	The Family Jewels	Pool hall owner
1965	That Funny Feeling	Bartender
1965	Perry Mason	Pete Kamboly
1966	Frankie and Johnny	Blackie
1966	Movie Star, American Style or; LSD, I Hate You	Joe Horner, producer
1966	The Green Hornet	Bud Crocker
1966	The Man from U.N.C.L.E.	Simon Baldanado
1967	Fort Utah	Ben Stokes
1967	The Monkees	Captain in S1:E25 "Alias Micky Dolenz"
1971	Dagmar's Hot Pants, Inc.	John Blackstone
1975	The Noah (filmed 1968)	Noah
