= Tom Kelley (photographer) =

American photographer (1914–1984)

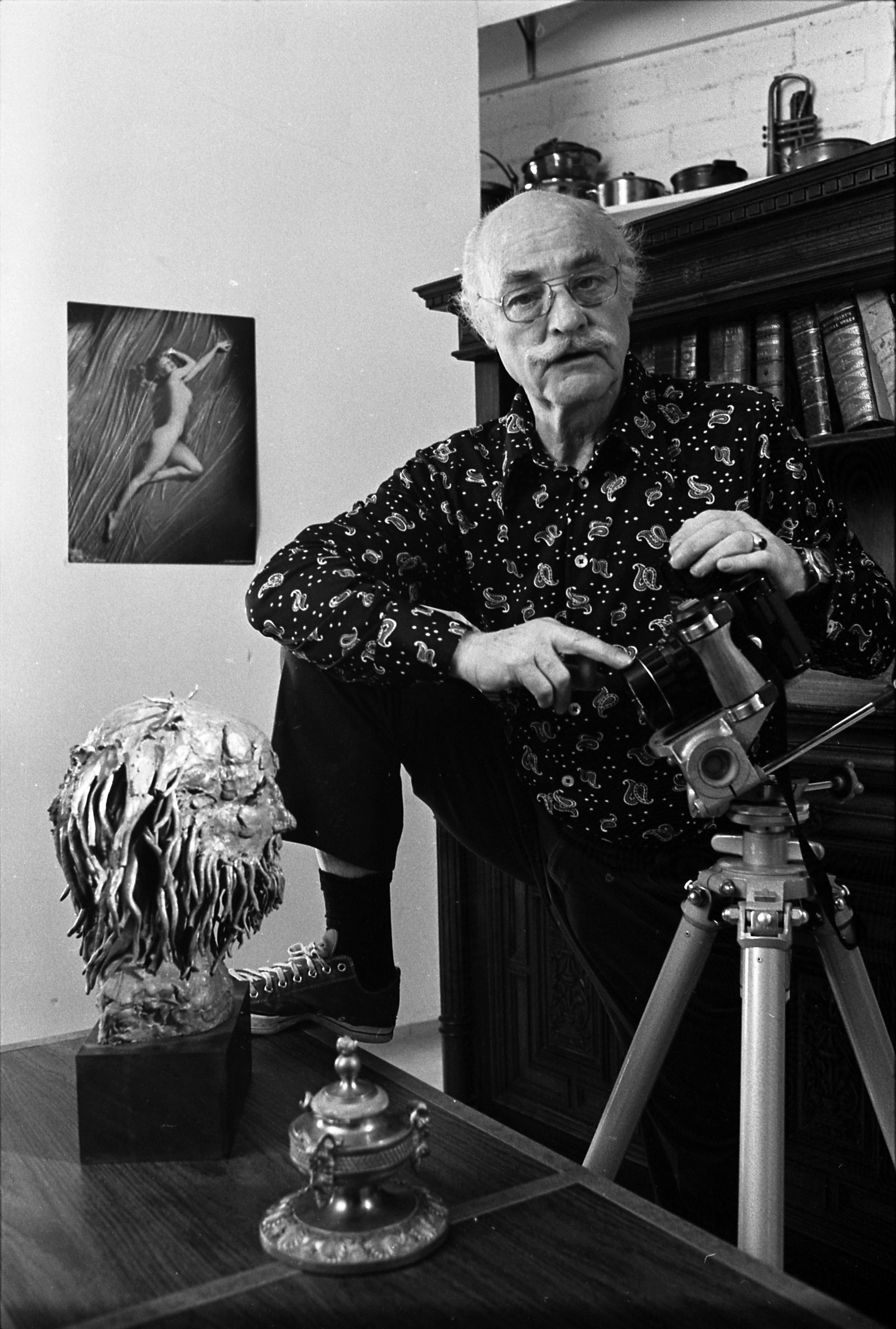
- Kelley with A New Wrinkle calendar
- Born: Tom Kelley; December 12, 1914; Philadelphia, Pennsylvania, U.S.
- Died: January 8, 1984 (aged 69); Los Angeles, California, U.S.
- Occupation: Photographer
- Known for: Entertainment, commercial, and advertising photography
- Children: 1

Tom Kelley Sr. (December 12, 1914 – January 8, 1984) was an American photographer who photographed Hollywood celebrities in the 1940s and 1950s. He is best known for his iconic 1949 nude photographs of Marilyn Monroe, which were distributed widely as calendar art—one of which was featured in the inaugural issue of Playboy magazine in 1953. He paid Marilyn Monroe only $50 for the shoot.

== Biography ==
Kelley was born in Philadelphia, Pennsylvania. He learned photography as an apprentice in a New York photo studio, and then worked for the Associated Press and Town & Country magazine. After moving to California in 1935, Kelley established a photography studio in Hollywood and produced promotional photographs of motion picture stars. David O. Selznick and Samuel Goldwyn retained Kelley to take promotional photos of their stars and starlets for magazine covers and advertising. Later, Kelley's business shifted to commercial and advertising photography.

Some of Kelley's most famous photo subjects have included Gary Cooper, Greta Garbo, James Cagney, Clark Gable, Winston Churchill, Bob Hope, Marlene Dietrich, Joan Crawford, Jack Benny, David Bowie, John F. Kennedy, Dwight D. Eisenhower, Franklin D. Roosevelt, Yma Sumac and, of course, Marilyn Monroe, with and without clothes. Tom Kelley had a way of making his subjects feel comfortable behind the camera. He would bring his wife with him to his shoots to create a more soothing and relaxed atmosphere.

Kelley served on the panel of judges at the Miss Universe 1952 and Miss Universe 1956 pageants. Kelley was one of the judges for the famed annual Cavalcades of Jazz beauty contests from 1955 to 1958 which was held at Wrigley Field in Los Angeles and the last one at The Shrine Auditorium. These concerts and beauty pageants were produced by an African-American Leon Hefflin, Sr. Kelley appeared in the 1966 documentary film The Legend of Marilyn Monroe.

== The Red Velvet photos ==
When Kelley originally approached Marilyn about the nude shoot, she turned him down. Monroe was concerned initially about the potential negative effects that such publicity could bring her young career. She was aware that at that time it was not considered traditionally "appropriate" to be nude. Nonetheless, a few days later she gave in and decided to pose for the photos, signing them ' Mona Monroe'. Kelley believed that it was in part because she owed him a favor, having lent her a few bucks for a cab ride home. But Monroe herself said several times that she really just needed the money when she was hungry and needed to make a payment on her vehicle. She joked, however, that she was glad she wasn't eating much at the time because it gave her "a real washboard stomach" in the photos. Upon doing the shoot, Kelley stated "all of her constraints seemed to vanish with her clothes", and that she seemed to be more "herself" in the nude. He even went as far as to say that she was "graceful as an otter". Kelley gave Marilyn fifty dollars for the shoot and, despite its aggressive popularity, she never received any additional remuneration.

== Playboy Past ==
The photos of Monroe also succeeded in building a relationship between Tom Kelley and Hugh Hefner. In 1953 Hefner was getting serious about introducing his new sexually charged magazine, Playboy. Featuring Kelley's now-classic photo of Marilyn Monroe on the cover of its very first issue significantly factored in Playboy's launch into popularity, selling over 50,000 copies. Continuing to partner with Hefner for future editions, Kelley always seemed to make his models more relaxed in order to obtain uniquely appealing and popular photos. One model, Neva Gilbert, Miss July 1954, remembered the experience in a 2016 Associated Press interview, again recalling how he would always bring his wife with him to the shoots. Kelley had her lay on a tiger rug with red painted nails for $20 an hour. Neva said of the photos, "I didn't think it was dirty. I felt they were in good taste. I thought nudes were lovely."

== Legacy ==
Tom Kelley Jr. attempted to auction off not only his father's photographs of Marilyn Monroe, but also their intellectual property rights such that the buyer could remarket them in any way they so chose. Kelley Jr. set the price high, but when the bid reached only $840,000, he decided not to sell.
