= Lyn Thomas =

American actress

- Born: Jacqueline Thomas; November 2, 1929; Fort Wayne, Indiana, U.S.
- Died: August 26, 2004 (aged 74); Riverside, California, U.S.
- Occupation: Actress
- Years active: 1948–1961 (film & TV)
- Spouse(s): George Warren Hedges (1952–1954); Jules Salkin (1958–1959); William W. Holl (1978–2004) (her death)

Lyn Thomas (born Jacqueline Thomas; 1929–2004) was an American stage, television, and film actress.

Thomas's first name was changed from Jacqueline to Lyn by a studio executive. Her film debut came in 1947.

== Filmography ==
| Year | Title | Role | Notes |
|---|---|---|---|
| 1948 | Stage Struck | Ruth Ames | |
| 1949 | The Accused | Miss Parker | Uncredited |
| 1949 | Harmony Inn | June Wallace | |
| 1949 | Black Midnight | Cindy Baxter | |
| 1950 | Cheaper by the Dozen | Girl on Beach | Uncredited |
| 1950 | Kill the Umpire | Pretty Wife | Uncredited |
| 1950 | Covered Wagon Raid | Gail Warren | |
| 1950 | Triple Trouble | Shirley O'Brien, Gabe's Secretary | |
| 1950 | The Petty Girl | Patti McKenzie | Uncredited |
| 1950 | Big Timber | June | |
| 1950 | The Missourians | Peg Finn | |
| 1951 | That's My Boy | Student | Uncredited |
| 1953 | Red River Shore | Peggy Taylor | |
| 1954 | Witness to Murder | Joyce Stewart - Victim | Uncredited |
| 1958 | Spacemaster X-7 | Laura Greeling | |
| 1958 | Frontier Gun | Kate Durand | |
| 1959 | Alaska Passage | Janet Mason | |
| 1959 | Frontier Gun | Keely Harris | |
| 1959 | Here Come the Jets | Joyce | |
| 1960 | Three Came to Kill | June Parker | |
| 1960 | Noose for a Gunman | Della Haines | |

== Selected television ==
| Year | Title | Role | Episode |
|---|---|---|---|
| 1953 | Death Valley Days | Mary Ann King | "Which Side of the Fence" |
| 1954 | The Abbott and Costello Show | Dot | "Private Eye" |
| 1956 | The Adventures of Superman | The Duchess | "The Deadly Rock" |
| 1956 | Death Valley Days | Ellie Todd | "The Sinbuster " |
| 1957 | Death Valley Days | Ivy Scott | "Lady Engineer" |
| 1961 | The Life and Legend of Wyatt Earp | Lola | "Wyatt Takes the Primrose Path" |

== Bibliography ==
- Bernard A. Drew. Motion Picture Series and Sequels: A Reference Guide. Routledge, 2013.
