= Here Come the Jets =

1959 film by Gene Fowler Jr.

Here Come the Money
- Theatrical release poster
- Directed by: Gene Fowler, Jr.
- Screenplay by: Louis Vittes
- Produced by: Richard Einfeld
- Starring: Steve Brodie; Lyn Thomas; Mark Dana; John Doucette; Jean Carson; Carleton Young
- Cinematography: Karl Struss; Kay Norton (aerial photography)
- Edited by: Harry W. Gerstad
- Music by: Paul Dunlap
- Production company: Associated Producers Incorporated
- Distributed by: 20th Century Fox
- Release date: June 8, 1959
- Running time: 72 minutes
- Country: United States
- Language: English

Here Come the Jets is a 1959 American aviation drama film directed by Gene Fowler, Jr. and written by Louis Vittes. The API, the B picture unit of 20th Century Fox was involved. Here Come the Jets stars Steve Brodie, Lyn Thomas, Mark Dana, John Doucette, Jean Carson and Carleton Young. (Note: Here Come the Jets closes with an offscreen narrator explaining that although the events in the film were fictional, the "jet age" has truly arrived.)

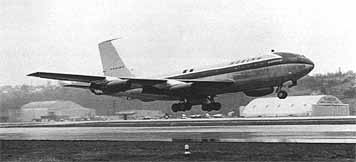
The first Boeing 707 airliner

== Plot ==
Ex-USAF pilot, and now an alcoholic, James Logan (Steve Brodie) resorts to pawning his Distinguished Service Medal awarded in the Korean War. to raise money for his next drink. Jailed for disorderly conduct, after a fight at a seedy nightclub, his arrest makes headlines. His friend, Ted Wallack (Mark Dana), heads up the test pilot program at the Harrison Air Craft Company, and offers Jim a job. Randall (John Doucette), the no-nonsense head of engineering is wary of Logan and his drinking. Getting lodging at a boarding house owned by Jean Carter (Jean Carson), Logan soon ends up back at a bar where he accidentally spills his drink on Joyce Matthews (Lyn Thomas) who later turns up as the head of the plant's medical department, who will oversee a battery of physical and psychological exams.

As the prototype Harrison airliner nears completion, Logan trains in a flight simulator but the sound of the raring engines causes him to panic. He tries to resign but Randall refuses to accept his resignation, assigning him to be Ted's co-pilot. Company president Burton (Carleton Young) wants Logan to be fired as he is too controversial but Randall refuses.

The night before the maiden flight, at the local restaurant, Logan is greeted by "Logan's Loonies," his old squadron from the war. His former friend, Steve Henley Joe Turkel can not forget what he called "ditching the fight" in Korea and starts a fight. Logan is shaken and is not sure he will be able to go through with the flight.

On the day of the test flight, Randall orders Logan to take the controls from Ted, telling him that "Logan's Loonies" saved his son's life in Korea, and he feels bound to give him a second chance. Encouraged by Randall, Logan confidently takes the controls and safely lands the aircraft.

== Cast ==
- Steve Brodie as James Logan
- Lyn Thomas as Joyce Matthews
- Mark Dana as Ted Wallack
- John Doucette as Randall
- Jean Carson as Jean Carter
- Carleton Young as Burton
- Joe Turkel as Steve Henley (as Joseph Turkel)
- I. Stanford Jolley as Bartender
- Gloria Moreland as B-Girl
- Vikki Dougan as Blonde
- B.B. Hughes as Stripper
- Walter Maslow as Joe

== Production ==
Originally director Gene Fowler, Jr. intended to collaborate with Louis Vittes on the screenplay. Principal photography on Here Come the Jets started on January 19, 1959. Additional filming took place from mid-late February 1959. As a B film, a great deal of reliance was on stock footage of the new Boeing 707 airliner.

== Reception ==
The film was released in June 1959.

== Bibliography ==
- Paris, Michael. From the Wright Brothers to Top Gun: Aviation, Nationalism, and Popular Cinema. Manchester, UK: Manchester University Press, 1995. ISBN 9780719040733.
- Pendo, Stephen. Aviation in the Cinema. Lanham, Maryland: Scarecrow Press, 1985. ISBN 0810817462.
