= Naura Hayden =

American actress and author (1930–2013)

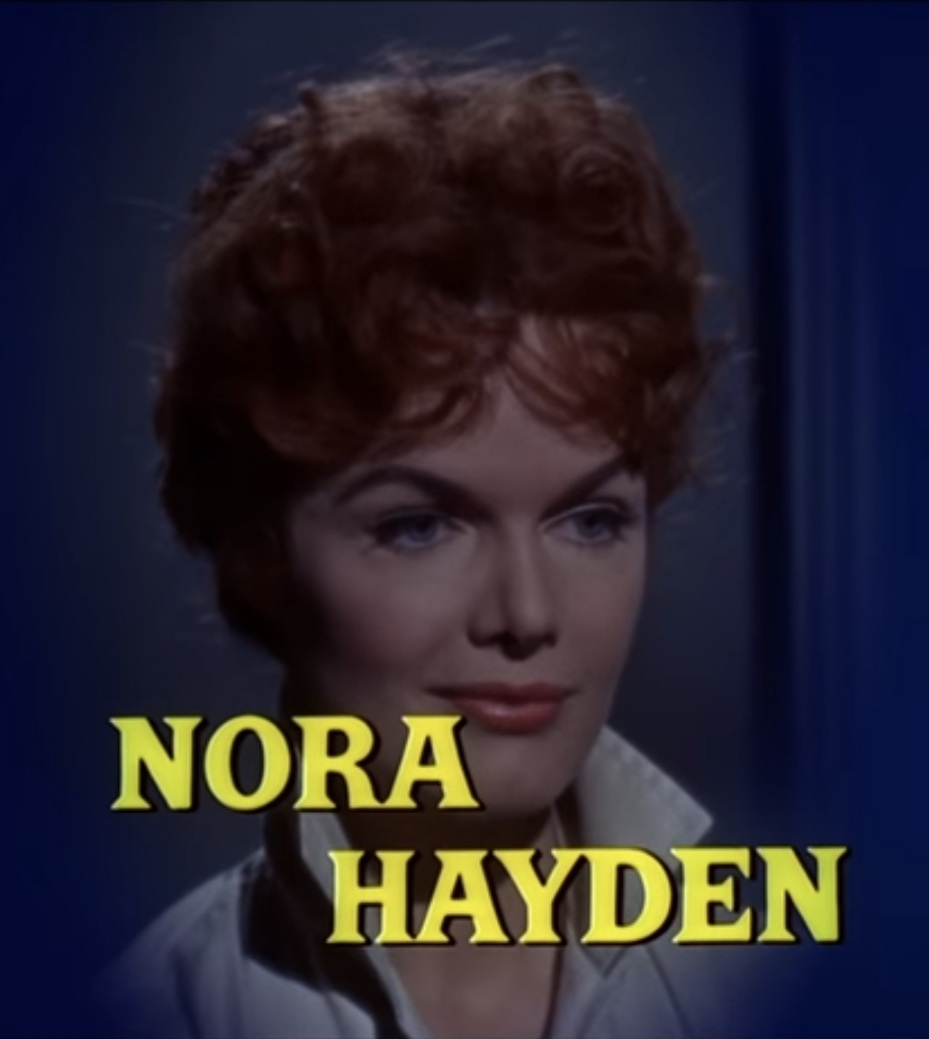
- Hayden in The Angry Red Planet (1959)
- Born: Norah Helene Hayden; September 29, 1930; Los Angeles, California, U.S.
- Died: August 10, 2013 (aged 82); New York City, U.S.
- Occupations: Actress; author; singer
- Years active: 1951–1986
- Known for: The Angry Red Planet (1959)
- Notable work: Everything You've Always Wanted to Know About Energy, But Were Too Tired to Ask; Isle of View (Say It Out Loud); How to Satisfy a Woman Every Time--And Have Her Beg for More!
- Spouses: John Harrison (m. 1963; div. 1969) Gary Stevens (m. 1969; div. 1975) Theodore Geiser (m. 1975)
- Relatives: Phyllis McGinley (aunt)

Norah Helene Hayden (September 29, 1930 – August 10, 2013) was an American actress, and as Naura Hayden an author, who worked in entertainment also as Nora Hayden and in modeling as Helene Hayden.

== Biography ==
Hayden was the daughter of Los Angeles Times reporter John Hayden and his wife (née Bussens). An aunt was Phyllis McGinley Hayden. She was a long-time resident of New York City.

She was noticed as a photo model at age 19 when featured in the December 1949 issue of Glamorous Models magazine. In 1955, she toured 68 cities to promote Mercury automobiles and attract tourists to the Southeastern United States, and in 1958, columnist Earl Wilson dubbed her his "perfect Wilson girl". That year, under contract to Sidney W. Pink, she joined a Canadian musical cast of Li'l Abner and began appearing on television. Her best-known commercial was promoting RCA Color TV in the early 1960s.

Hayden appeared in television shows such as 77 Sunset Strip (1958),The Real McCoys (1958), and Bonanza (1961), and the presentation of the Emmy Awards (1962), where she carried the "Miss Emmy" torch for host Johnny Carson. She appeared in Gunsmoke, episode "Lacey" in 1962. She had substantial parts in several motion pictures and authored a number of books, such as Everything You've Always Wanted to Know About Energy, But Were Too Tired to Ask and her best-seller, How to Satisfy a Woman Every Time which had sold over a half a million copies by 1992. Her career also included the radio show Naura's Good News on WMCA (1982), record albums And then She Wrote (1976) and Equal Time (1979), appearances as a singer at the Round Table and managing Manhattan restaurants Opera Espresso at the Empire Hotel in Manhattan. and Our Place. She starred in the off-Broadway musical Be Kind to People Week in 1975.

Her best-known film appearance is a starring role in the 1959 science-fiction film The Angry Red Planet, written by Sidney W. Pink and directed by Ib Melchior.

Hayden was married (1964) to restaurateur John Harrison, (1969–1973) to television executive Gary Stevens and to attorney Theodore Geiser (1975).
