= Arthur Pierce =

Arthur Pierce may refer to:

- Arthur C. Pierce (1923–1987), American screenwriter and director
- Arthur J. Pierce, head football coach for the Middlebury College Panthers football team, 1909
