= Arthur J. Pierce =

American football coach

Coaching career (HC unless noted)
- 1909: Middlebury

Head coaching record
- Overall: 2–3

Arthur J. Pierce was the head football coach for the Middlebury College Panthers football team in 1909. He compiled a record of 2–3.

== Head coaching record ==
Year	Team	Overall	Conference	Standing	Bowl/playoffs
Middlebury (Independent) (1909)
1909	Middlebury	2–3			
Middlebury:		2–3			
Total:		2–3			
