= Valley of the Dragons (film) =

1961 film by Edward Bernds

- Theatrical poster.
- Directed by: Edward Bernds
- Written by: Edward Bernds
- Story by: Donald Zimbalist
- Based on: the novel Career of a Comet by Jules Verne
- Produced by: Byron Roberts executive Al Zimbalist
- Starring: Cesare Danova, Sean McClory, Joan Staley and Danielle De Metz
- Cinematography: Brydon Baker
- Edited by: Edwin H. Bryant
- Music by: Ruby Raksin
- Production company: Zimbalist-Roberts-Bernds Productions
- Distributed by: Columbia Pictures
- Release date: October 25, 1961
- Running time: 79 minutes
- Country: United States
- Language: English
- Budget: $125,000

Valley of the Dragons (released in UK as Prehistoric Valley) is a black and white 1961 American science fiction film loosely based on Jules Verne's 1877 novel Off on a Comet (aka Hector Servadac) and heavily dependent on stock footage from the movies One Million B.C., King Dinosaur, Cat-Women of the Moon and Rodan. Director Edward Bernds says the film was originally built around stock footage from One Million B.C.

The film was released on October 25, 1961 by Columbia Pictures on a double feature with William Castle's Mr. Sardonicus (1961).

== Plot ==
Two men preparing for a duel in 1881 Algiers, Irishman Michael Denning and Frenchman Hector Servadac, are swept from the face of the Earth by a passing comet and find themselves on another world with cavemen and prehistoric animals. They try to find a way back to Earth.

The men have encounters with giant reptiles and spiders before being separated after an attack from an angry mammoth. Servadac finds refuge with the River People and falls for a beautiful blonde, Deena. Denning falls in with the Cave People, where he falls in love with brunette Nateeta.

The two men are reunited rescuing the Cave People from attacking dinosaurs with an avalanche. They persuade the River People and Cave People to stop fighting and settle down with their respective women. They vow to try and get back onto the Earth the next time the comet approaches in seven years.

== Cast ==
- Cesare Danova as Hector Servadac
- Sean McClory as Denning
- Joan Staley as Deena
- Danielle De Metz as Nateeta
- Gregg Martell as Od-Loo
- Gil Perkins as Tarn/doctor
- I. Stanford Jolley as Patoo
- Michael Lane as Anoka
- Roger Til as Vidal
- Mark Dempsey as Andrews
- Jerry Sunshine as Leclerc
- Dolly Gray as Mara
- Jack Elam as head caveman (uncredited)

== Prehistoric Creatures featured ==
- Dimetrodon (live-acted by an alligator with an attached spine sail)
- Doedicurus (live-acted by the Nine-banded armadillo)
- Giant man-sized Spider
- A carnivorous mammal (live-acted by a white-nosed coati)
- Monitor lizard, possibly the Australian "Devil Dragon"
- Pterodactylus (stock footage of the giant, flying monster, Rodan, from the movie "Rodan")
- Tyrannosaurus Rex, portrayed by a Blue iguana
- Woolly mammoths In the movie, called Mastodons (live-acted by customized Asian elephants)

== Production ==
The film was produced by Al Zimbalist who says he was given a copy of the Verne novel that his 16-year-old son Don had found in a London bookshop. Director Edward Bernds says the novel had not been published in the US due to its antisemitism.

Jules Verne adaptations were in vogue at the time ever since the success of Twenty Thousand Leagues Under the Sea and Around the World in 80 Days. Zimbalist had the rights to footage for One Million B.C. (1940). Zimbalist and his partner Bryan Roberts formed a company to adapt the Verne novel.

"Jules Verne is a bigger name than Marlon Brando," said Zimbalist. "Maybe bigger. Verne has never had a flop. And there is no limit to how much money you can make with Verne. Look at Around the World in 80 Days. Fantastic. Verne is for any size budget. If you want to spend millions, like Mike Todd, you can spend. If you want to spend less than a million, like me, that's okay, too. With Verne you don't have to have a Marilyn Monroe."

"Verne is the purest kind of escapist," said Zimbalist, adding that "whatever you say about his imagination and his genius, he just did not have a good storyline."

Bernds wrote a ten-page treatment, which Zimbalist took to Columbia Pictures to obtain finance. Bernds then wrote the script. He said the only contribution Al Zimbalist's son Don made to the film was finding the original novel in the bookshop; Don Zimbalist gets a "story by" credit but Bernds says this was only because his father asked for it.

It was shot in "Living Monstascope" on the Columbia backlot. Bernds says making the film at Columbia was inefficient because the movie had to absorb studio overhead and he would have gotten greater production value for the budget if the film had been made outside. He says Columbia executives had a clause where if the film went over budget, Zimbalist and Roberts would forfeit their fees. However he says he was saved by the fact that Zimbalist ensured the amount of company overhead was fixed, and that the filmmakers could use a left over jungle set from Columbia's The Devil at 4 O'Clock (1961) that cost half a million to make; the entire film was shot on that set. The movie was completed on budget.

Bernds re-used a spider from his earlier film World Without End (1956).

== Reception ==
Bernds says the film was financially successful and had a long run on television. Bernds believed that, in residual cheques for television showings over the years, Valley of the Dragons gave him more income than his script work on the Elvis Presley picture Tickle Me.

== See also ==
- On the Comet (1970)
