= Byron Roberts (producer) =

American film producer (1910–2003)

- Roberts in 1974
- Born: Byron Silverman; August 20, 1910; Brooklyn, New York, U.S.
- Died: June 11, 2003 (aged 92); Beverly Hills, California, U.S.
- Years active: 1947–1980
- Spouse: Sarah T. Roberts (m. 1937)

Byron Roberts (August 20, 1910 – June 11, 2003), son of Moses L. and Esther Silverman, was an American producer, production manager, second unit director and assistant director, most notably of Logan's Run (1976) and Baby Face Nelson (1957) with Mickey Rooney and Carolyn Jones. He was a frequent collaborator of low-budget producer Al Zimbalist.

== Producer ==
- The Gong Show Movie (1980) (co-producer)
- The Day the Lord Got Busted (1976) (associate producer)
- ... aka Soul Hustler (USA)
- The Hard Ride (1971) (associate producer)
- Young Dillinger (1965) (associate producer)
- Valley of the Dragons (1961) (producer)
- ... aka Prehistoric Valley (UK)
- Five Gates to Hell (1959) (associate producer)
- Baby Face Nelson (1957) (associate producer)
- From Hell It Came (1957) (associate producer)
- Sierra Stranger (1957) (associate producer)
- Hot Rod Girl (1956) (associate producer)
