= Drums of Africa =

1963 film by James B. Clark

- Original film poster
- Directed by: James B. Clark
- Written by: Robin Estridge
- Based on: story by Arthur Hoerl
- Produced by: Philip N. Krasne; Al Zimbalist
- Starring: Frankie Avalon
- Cinematography: Paul C. Vogel
- Edited by: Ben Lewis
- Music by: Johnny Mandel
- Production company: Metro-Goldwyn-Mayer
- Distributed by: Metro-Goldwyn-Mayer
- Release date: May 15, 1963
- Running time: 92 minutes
- Country: United States
- Language: English

Drums of Africa is a 1963 American adventure film set in Africa, directed by James B. Clark.

It used footage from the 1950 film King Solomon's Mines.

== Plot ==
Three adventurers fight slave traders in the Congo.

== Cast ==
- Frankie Avalon as Brian Ferrers
- Mariette Hartley as Ruth Knight
- Lloyd Bochner as David Moore
- Torin Thatcher as Jack Cuortemayn
- Hari Rhodes as Kasongo
- George Sawaya as Arab
- Michael Pate as Viledo
- Ronald Whelan as Ship captain
- Peter Mamakos as Chavera

== Production ==
The film was shot on the MGM backlot using footage from King Solomon's Mines (1950). Producer Al Zimbalist had previously made another film for MGM using this method, Watusi (1959).

The film was originally known as African Adventure and The African Story.

Mariette Hartley was under contract to MGM after Ride the High Country. She wrote in her memoirs, "The way to tell if you're seeing footage from King rather than Drums is the "more than five" test. If there's more than five of anything, you're watching King Solomon 's Mines. Drums is what they call an "under five" movie: under five actors, under five elephants, under five trees, and under five minutes."

The character of Allan Quartmain was renamed "Courtemayn".

Filming started 1 October 1962. It mostly took place at the Fox Ranch at Malibu, California. Hank Moonjean, who worked on the film, wrote, "If you should ever have the misfortune of seeing this "dog" on television, look for the arrows sticking into the "rocks." Also, you might see the same extras, first as slave traders shooting at Arabs when actually the Arabs were the slave traders. We had a very small budget."

Al Zimbalist was so impressed with Frankie Avalon he announced a project to star the actor called Skirts of Sergeant McHugh to also star Mickey Rooney and Gary Crosby.

== Reception ==
The Daily News called it "a lukewarm cup of African drum beating drama."

Academic Kenneth Cameron wrote there was "the kernel of a very good film in Drums of Africa — something about love, rather than romance or boy-meets-girl. As it is, the film is a ridiculous hash. And what, you may ask, was Frankie Avalon doing in Africa?" Filmink called it "a silly movie" in which Frankie Avalon was "uneasily cast – it's not his fault, he tries his guts out, he simply looks odd in 19th century Africa with a rifle and his character has no purpose in the story other than to ask questions."
