= Demographics of Mitrovica =

Mitrovica (Albanian: Mitrovicë or Mitrovica; Serbian: Косовска Митровица / Kosovska Mitrovica; Turkish: Mitroviça), is a city and municipality in northern Kosovo.[a] In 2013 the Municipality of Mitrovica was separated into two administrative units, northern and southern Mitrovica. The city is multi-ethnic though Albanians form the absolute majority. The Serbs are heavily concentrated in the north of the city across the River Ibar, an area known as North Mitrovica.

== Population ==
According to the 2011 Census conducted by the Kosovo Statistics Agency, Southern Mitrovica has a population of 71,909.

Its ethnic composition is made of Albanians 69,497, Ashkali 647, Roma 528, Turks 518, Bosniaks 416, Gorani 23, Serbs 14, Egyptians 6 and others 43.

=== Geographical division ===
In the table below are presented the data on gender and composition of population distribution in rural and urban areas.

Geographical Division	Total number of Population	Gender		Ethnicity										
Geographical Division	Total number of Population	Males	Females	Albanians	Serbs	Turks	Bosniaks	Roma	Ashkali	Egyptians	Gorani	Others	Unknown or did not answer	Indispensable data
Total	71,909	36,275	35,634	69,497	14	518	416	528	647	6	23	47	61	152
Urban	46,132	23,046	23,086	43,819	14	515	359	528	647	6	23	42	57	122
Rural	25,777	13,229	12,548	25,678	-	3	57	-	-	-	-	5	4	30

=== Population structure ===
Population structure according to the 2011 census is a presented below.

The first table expresses the population structure that mostly do not participate in the labor force, and statistics on young people and children.

Geographical Division	Total number of Population	Population					
Geographical Division	Total number of Population	Males	Females	Babies up to 12 months	Children 1-6	Children 7-14	Youth 15-27
Total	71,909	36,275	35,634	1,405	7,646	11,300	16,724
Urban	46,132	23,046	23,086	878	4,810	6,990	10,591
Rural	25,777	13,229	12,548	527	2,836	4,310	6,133

The following two tables show the population by sex according to the census.

Sex	Total	Group-age						
Sex	Total	0-4	5-9	10-14	15-19	20-24	25-29	30-34
Total	71,909	36,275	35,634	1,405	7,646	11,300	16,724	5,558
Males	36,275	3,313	3,443	3,780	3,481	3,433	3,061	2,719
Females	35,634	3,141	3,259	3,415	3,260	2,997	2,833	2,839

Sex	Total	Group-age								
Sex	Total	35-39	40-44	45-49	50-54	55-59	60-64	65-69	70-74	75-79
Total	4,978	4,169	3,806	3,535	2,986	2,387	1,989	1,548	881	656
Males	2,424	1,984	1,850	1,769	1,429	1,171	951	796	385	286
Females	2,554	2,185	1,956	1,766	1,557	1,216	1,038	752	496	370

The labor force in Mitrovica consists of 46,484 people of both sexes. Statistics on the numbers of rural and urban inhabitants able to work are presented.

Population able to participate in the labor force			65+
Total	Males	Females	65+
Total - 46,484	23,321	23,163	5,074
Urban - 30,104	14,929	15,175	3,350
Rural - 16,380	8,392	7,988	1,724

== Language ==
In Republic of Kosovo official languages are Albanian and Serbian. As an addition, according to its need on municipality level other languages such as Turkish, Bosnian and Roma are official languages.

Rank	Language	Population	Percentage
1	Albanian	69,497	96.64%
2	Roma	1181	1.64%%
3	Turkish	518	0.72%
4	Serb	430	0.59%
