= Monster from Green Hell =

1957 film by Kenneth G. Crane

- Theatrical release poster
- Directed by: Kenneth G. Crane
- Written by: Endre Bohem; Louis Vittes
- Produced by: Al Zimbalist
- Starring: Jim Davis; Barbara Turner; Robert E. Griffin
- Cinematography: Ray Flin
- Music by: Albert Glasser
- Distributed by: DCA
- Release date: May 22, 1957
- Running time: 71 minutes
- Country: United States
- Language: English
- Budget: $1 million

Monster from Green Hell is a 1957 adventure horror B movie. It was directed by Kenneth G. Crane, and starred Jim Davis (later of Dallas fame) and Barbara Turner. It was released on May 22, 1957, as a double feature with the English-dubbed, re-edited version of the 1955 Japanese tokusatsu film Half Human.

== Plot ==
In preparation for sending a crewed rocket into space, American scientists Dr. Quent Brady and Dan Morgan are put in charge of a program that sends various animals and insects into space to test their survival rates. After one of their rockets carrying wasps malfunctions and goes off course, a computer calculates that the rocket is likely to land somewhere off the coast of Africa. Some time later, in a remote part of Africa, Dr. Lorentz and his daughter Lorna perform an autopsy on a native and determine that he died of paralysis of the nerve centers caused by an injection of a massive amount of venom. Arobi, Lorentz's African assistant, then informs him that a monster is believed to be terrorizing people and animals in an area known as Green Hell.

Several months later, Brady reads a newspaper account of turmoil in Central Africa caused by gigantic monsters and surmises that the wasps in the missing rocket were exposed to huge amounts of cosmic radiation because an earlier, minimal overexposure had resulted in the birth of a spider crab twice the size of its mother. Brady and Morgan request a leave of absence from Washington and head for Africa to investigate.

In Libreville, equatorial Africa, the territorial agent makes plans for them to travel to meet Dr. Lorentz. Once the safari is ready, Mahri, an Arab, leads Brady and Morgan on the four-hundred mile trek to Lorentz's hospital. The safari battles brush fires, fever, drought and storms, eventually reaching the Lorentz compound where Lorna informs them that her father has not returned from a journey to Green Hell. Later, Arobi arrives with the news that Lorentz has been killed by a monster living in the cauldron of a volcano and gives Brady a giant stinger that he removed from the doctor's shoulder. After Brady analyzes the stinger, he confirms that it belongs to a giant, deadly wasp. Although Brady advises Lorna to stay at the hospital, she insists on accompanying him, Morgan, Mahri and Arobi to Green Hell.

When the native bearers learn of the destination, they desert, and although Lorna is able to shame several local villagers into helping, they, too, run off when the group comes upon a deserted native village littered with dead bodies. After Brady expresses his concern that the insects may be multiplying rapidly and could eventually overrun all of Africa, he states that they must destroy the queen and her immediate colony. Brady then explains to Mahri that he has brought small grenade-like bombs, filled with a special explosive, to use against the monsters. As they move closer to the base of the volcano, which shows signs of an imminent eruption, they hear a very loud, buzzing sound.

When Brady looks down from a ridge above the volcano, he finds the queen wasp and several gigantic workers. The four men toss grenades into the bowl, but the explosions only serve to anger the wasps. Lorna and the men are pursued by one of the wasps, the size of a large building, but hide in a cave that it cannot enter. The group escapes through another entrance and, just as they emerge, the volcano erupts, spewing massive lava flows that destroy all the wasps in the conflagration. Morgan then notes that nature has a way of destroying its mistakes.

== Cast ==
- Jim Davis as Dr. Quent Brady
- Robert Griffin as Dan Morgan
- Joel Fluellen as Arobi
- Barbara Turner as Lorna Lorentz
- Eduardo Ciannelli as Mahri
- Vladimir Sokoloff as Dr. Lorentz
- Tim Huntley as Territorial Agent
- LaVerne Jones as Kuana
- Frederic Potler as Radar Operator

== Production ==
Monster from Green Hell contains stock wild animal footage from the 1939 film Stanley and Livingstone. One of the filming locations was Bronson Caves located in Griffith Park, Hollywood. The film was released in black and white with a special tinted sequence added. The special effects were done by Jack Rabin, Louis DeWitt and Irving Block, with stop-motion animation by Gene Warren.

Film historian Bill Warren mentioned that he located one source that claimed Paul Blaisdell designed (and even operated) the giant wasp head, but according to Blaisdell, he only submitted a few pen and ink sketches of giant insects to Zimbalist while the film was in its initial planning stages, hoping to get hired. He claimed Zimbalist never returned his calls, nor did he ever return Blaisdell's sketches to him. Blaisdell claims he even tried to get his agent Forrest J. Ackerman to call Zimbalist and get his sketches back, to no avail.

The soundtrack score was done by Albert Glasser. The film's working title was originally Creature from Green Hell or The Beast from Green Hell. Although the print viewed included a 1956 copyright statement for Gross-Krasne, Inc., the film was not registered for copyright at the time of its release. However, the film was registered for copyright many years later by Wade Williams on November 26, 1984, under number PA 180–809.

== Critical reception ==
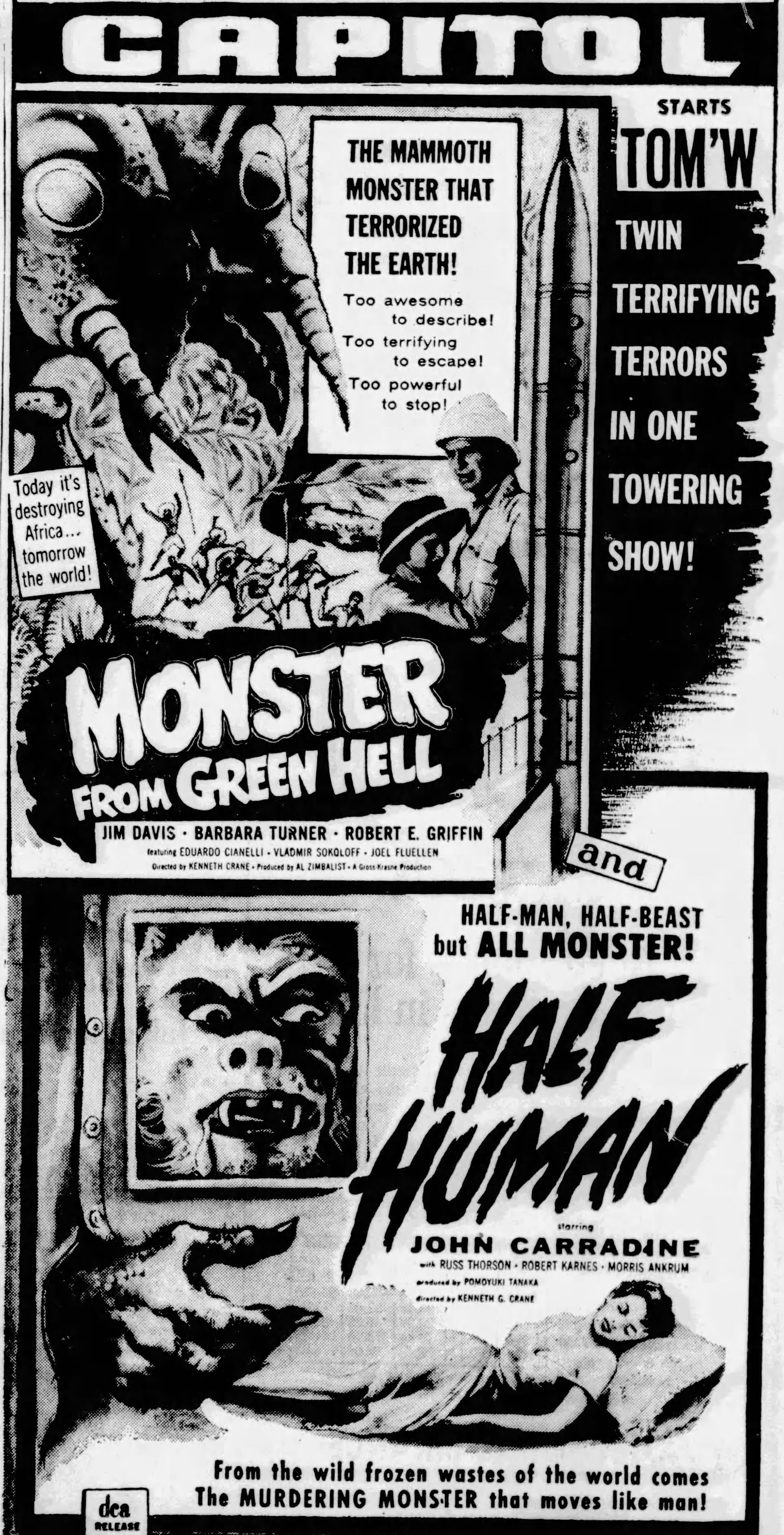
Advertisement from 1957 for Monster from Green Hell and co-feature, Half Human

Monster from Green Hell has received negative reviews from the few critics on Rotten Tomatoes. It holds a 2/5 average rating on Rotten Tomatoes and a low 3,3/10 on the Internet Movie Database.

Film critic Glenn Erickson wrote that the film is a "patchwork concoction [that] has just enough ‘good stuff’ to qualify as a fun monster show. Jim Davis’s stock-footage safari arrives just in time to be irrelevant," and that the credits lack "a full accounting of who did what, special effects-wise." A review of the film at AllMovie described it as "a horrible, ludicrous 'giant mutated insect' movie from 1958 that is strictly bottom of the barrel," noted that "there also is an incredible amount of dead space throughout the film" and "a high percentage of stock footage," and that "the cast is poor, with Jim Davis unbelievable as a scientist and Barbara Turner unappealing as the love interest. The script, by the way, is dreadful."

== In popular culture ==
In the Hamilton Invaders toy line from Remco which featured giant bugs vs. the military, the largest of the mechanical bugs, 'Horrible Hamilton', is designed after the giant wasps in this film. Another of the mechanical bug toys in this line was based on the giant ants in the 1954 film Them! and called 'The Spooky Spider', despite only having six legs.
