= Al Zimbalist =

American film producer (1910–1975)

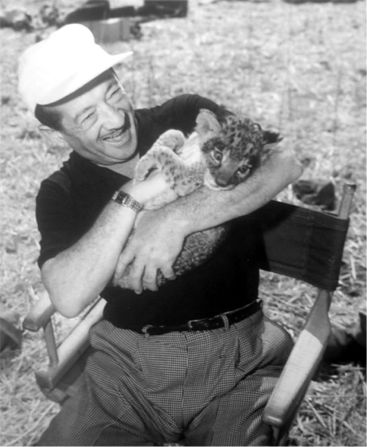
- On the set of Drums of Africa, 1963
- Born: Alfred Zimbalist; March 3, 1910; Kiev, Russian Empire (now Ukraine)
- Died: August 28, 1975 (age 65); Los Angeles
- Occupation: producer
- Years active: 1951–1965
- Spouse: Bernice Higgins
- Children: Donald Zimbalist

Alfred N. Zimbalist (March 3, 1910, Kiev, Russian Empire – August 28, 1975, Los Angeles) was a producer of low-budget films such as Robot Monster, Monster from Green Hell, Cat-Women of the Moon, Watusi and Baby Face Nelson.

Al Zimbalist was primarily known for B movies, science fiction, crime and horror. Al Zimbalist's son, Donald R. Zimbalist (Feb 17, 1936 – Oct 6, 2004), was a frequent collaborator.

== Early years ==
Al Zimbalist was the son of Nuchim Zimbalist (Russian: Нухим Цимбалист), a New York dressmaking foreman, and Feiga Fannie Weiner. Zimbalist was one of four children and immigrated to the US, arriving November 13, 1911, aboard the SS Lituania. He completed his education to the eighth grade. He was a first cousin to Hollywood producer Sam Zimbalist.

== Movie career ==
Zimbalist started his career in the film industry when he joined the Stanley Warner Theatres home-office in New York in 1929, working as an editor for the company's house organ, The Warner Club News. At 19, Zimbalist was said to be one of the youngest editors in the industry. During this time, he was co-author and director of the Warner Gaieties and later executive assistant to producer Edward L. Alperson. Zimbalist continued producing company club events when he joined the publicity and advertising department at RKO-Pathe in 1931.

Zimbalist worked in theatres and publicity for the 1930s and 1940s, including stints at Warner Bros. and RKO Theatres. In 1947, he was head of publicity for Film Classics. He left Film Classics in 1949 and worked as an assistant on some Edward Albertson releases in 1951 and 1952.

In 1952, Zimbalist announced he had formed Motion Picture Artists to make moderate-priced "class exploitation films". These would include Miss Robin Crusoe, Half-caste Girl and La Virgin de Cadiz. Of these only the first was made.

However he did produce Cat-Women of the Moon (1953) with Jack Rabin.

Zimbalist produced King Dinosaur and intended to follow it with White Slave Ring but it was not made.

He formed ZS Productions with Irving Shulman to make a film based on the latter's unpublished novel about Baby Face Nelson. They partnered with Mickey Rooney's Fryman Enterprises to make Baby Face Nelson (1957).

=== MGM ===
The film was popular enough for Zimbalist to be signed to MGM. His first film for them was Watusi a sequel to King Solomon's Mines (1950), using footage from that film. The second was a remake of Tarzan, the Ape Man (1959) which also used King Solomon's Mines footage.

Zimbalist then made Valley of the Dragons at Columbia based on a Jules Verne novel. This movie made use of footage from One Million B.C. (1940).

He then went back to MGM for Drums of Africa (1963), using footage from King Solomon's Mines once more. After Drums of Africa Zimbalist was going to make Jazz Jungle but it was never made.

=== Later career ===
In 1964 he was going to make The Sea Creature for Jack Warner Jr. The film was never made. Zimbalist set up at the Goldwyn studios and announced plans to make 12 films starting with Young Dillinger. Young Dillinger used footage from Baby Face Nelson.

After Young Dillinger he and star Nick Adams wanted to make Guns of the G Men but it was never made. In 1969 he registered the title Sea of Tranquility but no film resulted.

== Select credits ==
- Robot Monster (1953)
- Cat-Women of the Moon (1953)
- Miss Robin Crusoe (1953)
- King Dinosaur (1955)
- Monster from Green Hell (1957)
- Baby Face Nelson (1957)
- Watusi (1959)
- Tarzan, the Ape Man (1959)
- Prehistoric Valley (1961), US title Valley of the Dragons
- Drums of Africa (1963)
- Young Dillinger (1965)
