= Wetbacks (film) =

1956 film

- Directed by: Hank McCune
- Written by: Hank McCune; Edward D. Wood Jr.
- Produced by: Byron Roberts; Hank McCune
- Starring: Lloyd Bridges; Nancy Gates; Barton MacLane
- Cinematography: Brydon Baker
- Edited by: Ronald V. Ashcroft
- Music by: Les Baxter
- Production company: Pacific Coast Pictures
- Distributed by: Banner Pictures; Monarch Film Corporation (UK)
- Release date: May 4, 1956
- Running time: 89 minutes
- Country: United States
- Language: English

Wetbacks is a 1956 American crime film directed by Hank McCune and starring Lloyd Bridges, Nancy Gates and Barton MacLane. An independent production, the title is a reference to "wetbacks" a now derogatory term for illegal immigrants coming into the United States across the Mexican border. Location shooting took place around Santa Catalina Island and San Pedro in Los Angeles. It has plot similarities to the 1950 film The Breaking Point.

== Plot ==
The United States Coast Guard is concerned by the amount of human trafficking going on with large numbers of illegal immigrants being tricked into entering the country by promises of good jobs, only then to be economically exploited as cheap labor. Meanwhile, ex-Coast Guard officer Jim Benson, running a struggling charter fishing boat business, is reluctantly persuaded to carry a consignment of migrants from Mexico to California.

== Cast ==
- Lloyd Bridges as Jim Benson
- Nancy Gates as Sally Parker
- Barton MacLane as Karl Shanks
- John Hoyt as Steve Bodine
- Harold Peary as Juan Ortega
- Nacho Galindo as Alfonso
- Robert Keys as Reeser
- David Colmans as Pedro
- Louis Jean Heydt as Coast Guard Comdr. Randall
- Roy Gordon as Hoppy
- I. Stanford Jolley as Fred
- Wally Cassell as Coast Guard lieutenant
- Tom Keene as Highway Patrol Inspector
- Salvador Baguez as Mexican Policeman
- Jose Gonzales-Gonzales as Immigrant
- Gene Roth as Truck Thug

== Bibliography ==
- Craig, Rob. Ed Wood, Mad Genius: A Critical Study of the Films. McFarland, 2009.
- Spicer, Andrew. Historical Dictionary of Film Noir. Scarecrow Press, 2010.
