= Young Dillinger =

1965 film by Terry O. Morse

- Directed by: Terry O. Morse
- Written by: Donald Zimbalist
- Screenplay by: Arthur Hoehl; Donald Zimbalist
- Produced by: Alfred Zimbalist
- Starring: John Ashley; Nick Adams; Robert Conrad
- Cinematography: Stanley Cortez
- Edited by: Terry Morse
- Music by: Shorty Rogers
- Production company: The Zimbalist Company
- Distributed by: Allied Artists
- Release date: April 28, 1965
- Running time: 102 mins
- Country: United States
- Language: English
- Budget: $200,000

Young Dillinger is a 1965 gangster film directed by Terry O. Morse. It stars Nick Adams as the notorious criminal John Dillinger, and co-stars Robert Conrad, John Ashley and Mary Ann Mobley.

== Plot ==
With help from Elaine, his girlfriend, young John Dillinger breaks into her father's safe. They are caught, but Dillinger takes the rap by himself.

In prison, he meets Pretty Boy Floyd and Baby Face Nelson, who join Dillinger's gang after he masterminds a prison break. The gang goes on a years-long crime spree, robbing banks and armored cars. Elaine goes along, but she becomes pregnant and is wounded in a shootout. Dillinger in forced to leave her behind, and she rats him out to the FBI in order to prevent the authorities from taking her baby.

== Cast ==
- Nick Adams as John Dillinger
- Robert Conrad as Pretty Boy Floyd
- John Ashley as Baby Face Nelson
- Mary Ann Mobley as Elaine
- Victor Buono as Professor Hoffman
- Dan Terranova as Homer Van Meter
- John Hoyt as Dr. Wilson
- Reed Hadley as Federal Agent Parker
- Robert Osterloh as Federal Agent Baum
- Anthony Caruso as Rocco
- Art Baker as Warden
- Gene Roth as Justice of Peace
- Harvey Gardner as Mills

== Production ==
The film was shot at Goldwyn Studios starting in November 1964. Al Zimbalist said he didn't want to glamourise the gangsters. "We just wanted to tell the story how three young men went wrong in hopes no other young people would make the same mistakes they made", he said.

Shot cheaply in 17 days without period costumes, Robert Conrad recalled that he only did the film to repay a favor to his friend Nick Adams. He says the film had "no budget" so "everyone had to do their own stunts" but it was during filming that he successfully auditioned for Wild Wild West.

John Ashley says the film "was basically all of (producer) Al Zimbalist's footage of machine guns and crashing cars from Baby Face Nelson (1957)."

Ashley added that the film "may have been the most fun of everything I ever did. At the time all three of us [Adams, Conrad and himself] were divorced. We were all living up in Nick's house. This film came along through Allied Artists. They actually approached Nick, and Nick said 'You should go see about getting John and Bobby'. We all agreed to it and we basically rewrote it. We took a lot of liberties with these three guys, but it was a lot of fun and a real pleasant experience." Ashley later produced some TV movies for Conrad.

During filming, the management of Allied Artists were engaged in a proxy fight with rebellious shareholders.

Adams and Zimbalist wanted to make another film together, Guns of the G Men. However it was never made.

== Reception ==
The Los Angeles Times called it "a B picture with A virtues... good performances... crisp direction... fast moving and full of action.

Cinema Retro later wrote "the movie breezes along at a brisk pace even if the style is quite unimpressive and pedestrian. In fact, the film looks like a standard TV episode of "The Untouchables" in terms of production values...The performances are adequate, nothing more."
