= Miss Robin Crusoe =

1953 film by Eugene Frenke

- Directed by: Eugene Frenke
- Screenplay by: Richard Yriondo; Harold Nebenzal
- Story by: Al Zimbalist (orig. story idea)
- Based on: Robinson Crusoe; 1719 novel by Daniel Defoe
- Produced by: Eugene Frenke
- Starring: Amanda Blake; George Nader; Rosalind Hayes
- Narrated by: Amanda Blake
- Cinematography: Virgil Miller
- Edited by: Merrill G. White; Thomas Pratt
- Music by: Elmer Bernstein
- Production company: Eastern Film Enterprises
- Distributed by: 20th Century Fox
- Release date: November 1, 1953
- Running time: 74-75 minutes
- Country: United States
- Language: English

Miss Robin Crusoe is a 1953 American low-budget adventure film produced and directed by Eugene Frenke and starring Amanda Blake, George Nader and Rosalind Hayes. One of many film variations of Daniel Defoe's 1719 novel Robinson Crusoe, it features a female castaway.

== Plot ==
On September 28, 1659, a ship founders. The captain's daughter and cabin boy named Robin Crusoe and a sailor named Sykes reach a deserted island. When Sykes tries to force Robin to show her appreciation for his efforts, she flees up a hill. In the ensuing struggle, he falls over a cliff and is killed.

She soon settles in, building herself a tree house, praying to God for protection from the hostile animals, and keeping track of her island life in her diary. She explores the rest of the island and briefly goes skinny dipping.

One day, a group of savages shows up with two women captives. She watches from hiding as they execute one in gruesome fashion. She then rescues the other, and the two fight off the men with the aid of her flintlock. She names her new companion Friday, as that was the day of her rescue. The two women become friends. Robin teaches Friday some words and soon starts to wear the same dress as her. Friday does caution her about a deadly fruit while they are foraging.

In December, Royal Navy officer Jonathan washes ashore after a storm sinks his ship and kill his crewmates. Robin's experiences with lecherous sailors and her cruel father have embittered her against men, and she is hostile and suspicious at first. When Jonathan learns that she is repairing a longboat that can hold only two, he suggests that the "fittest" take it and send help back for Friday. Robin insists she and Friday will use the boat. Eventually, Robin overcomes her prejudice against him, and they spend the night together.

The next morning, she awakens to find he has stolen the longboat and is sailing away. When he returns, she assumes he is a coward, and sets out to kill him. He informs her that he turned back for her. Before she can shoot him, however, the savages return and capture Friday. Robin and Jonathan rescue her, but are surrounded. When all seems lost, Robin admits she wants to marry Jonathan. Just then, a warship appears and bombards the attackers, enabling the trio to steal an outrigger canoe and reach the safety of the ship.

Robin writes the final entry in her journal with Jonathan's help as his hand is shown touching her hand.

== Cast ==
- Amanda Blake as Miss Robin Crusoe
- George Nader as Jonathan
- Rosalind Hayes as Friday

== Production ==
Miss Robin Crusoe had the working title "Miss Robinson Crusoe". When producer Eugene Franke attempted to register that title with the Motion Picture Registration Bureau, there were objections raised by Óscar Danciger, who had recently completed a film called Robinson Crusoe in Mexico, and M-G-M, which was planning a film to be called "Robinson Crusoe" starring Spencer Tracy. The MPRB decided in September 1953 that Franke could use either "Miss Robin Crusoe" or "Miss Robinson Crusoe". Danciger re-titled his film Adventures of Robinson Crusoe.

The director originally slated to helm the film was E. A. Dupont.

Production of the film – which was shot in Pathécolor – ended October 14, 1952 at Samuel Goldwyn Studios. Location shooting took place in Palos Verdes, California, in the Los Angeles metropolitan area.

Although Miss Robin Crusoe was a low-budget film, its score is by the noted film composer Elmer Bernstein, who, like many others in Hollywood during the witch hunt for Communists by the House Un-American Activities Committee, found it hard to get work. Bernstein had not been blacklisted, but had been what he referred to as "graylisted", saying "I wasn't one of the big wheels of the Communist Party or anything, but I'd done enough left-wing things that between about 1953 and 1955, the major studios would have been very loath to employ me." Bernstein was forced to take work that he would not have previously accepted, such as this film, as well as others such as Robot Monster and Cat-Women of the Moon.

== Critical response ==
The film was not well received. Critic Win Fanning wrote in the Pittsburgh Post-Gazette: "As it is quite impossible to believe that a number of grown men and women could seriously go about the making of a movie called Miss Robin Crusoe, it must be assumed some sort of joke is intended. It isn't a very good joke, but it has its moments of hilarity."
