= Robert Osterloh =

American actor (1918–2001)

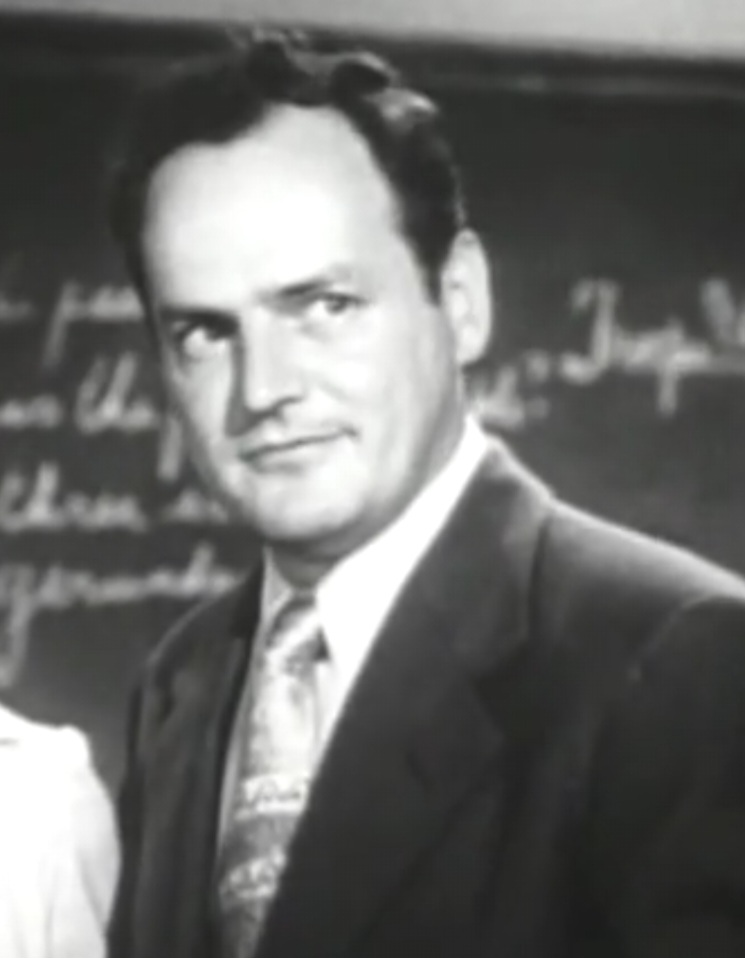
- Robert Osterloh in an episode of The Public Defender (1954)
- Born: May 31, 1918; Pittsburgh, Pennsylvania
- Died: April 16, 2001 (aged 82); Los Osos, California
- Occupation: Actor
- Spouse: Harriet Hughes

Robert Osterloh (May 31, 1918 – April 16, 2001) was an American actor. In a career spanning 20 years, he appeared in films such as The Dark Past (1948), The Wild One (1953), I Bury the Living (1958), and Young Dillinger (1965).

== Biography ==
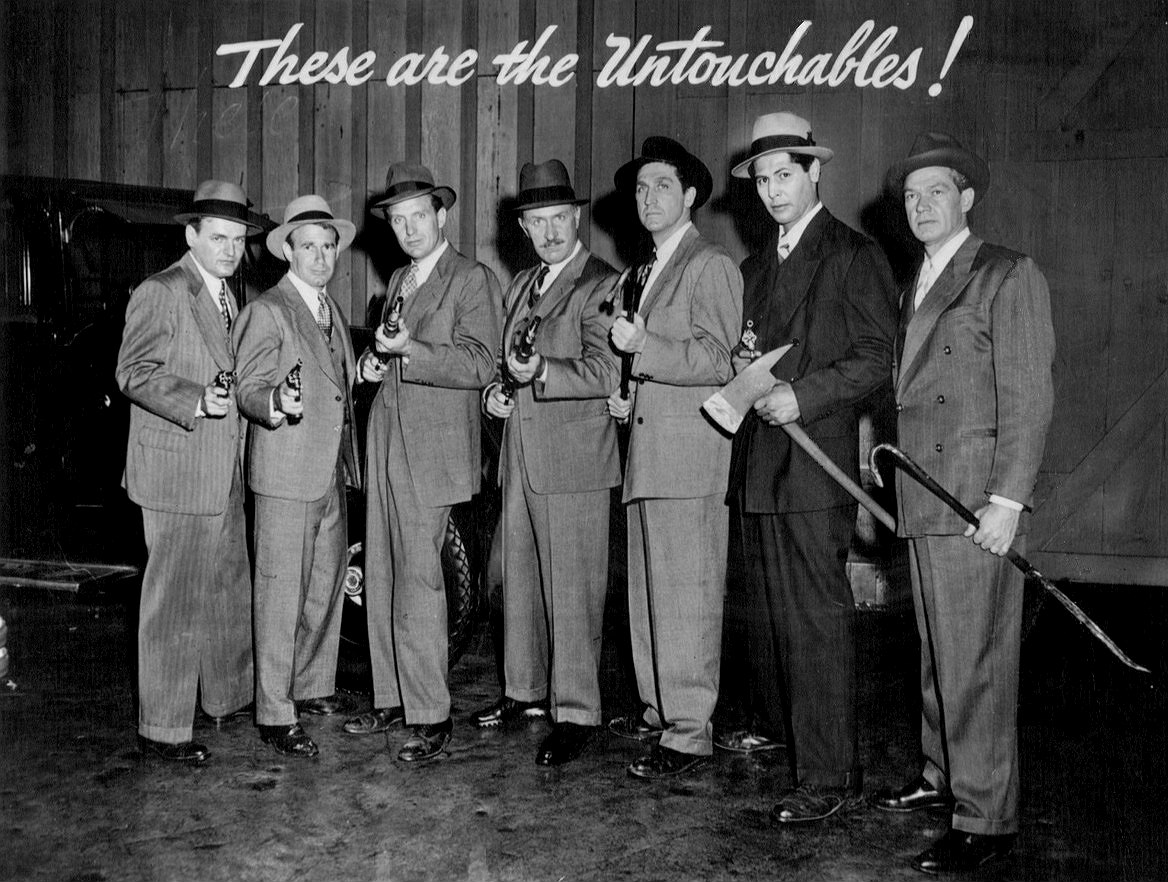
Robert Osterloh (left) in the Westinghouse Desilu Playhouse debut of The Untouchables (1959)

Osterloh was the son of Dr. Charles T. Osterloh and Emma Geiselhart Osterloh. As a student at Perry High School in Pittsburgh, Pennsylvania, he was president of the student council and the Dramatic Club, and he had the lead in the school's senior play.

An agent discovered Osterloh while he was acting in a stock theater. He had a supporting role in The Dark Past. Osterloh continued his career for 20 years, mainly in the 1950s, playing roles in films such as Illegal Entry (1949), White Heat (1949), One Minute to Zero (1952), Star in the Dust (1956), and I Bury the Living (1958). In the 1960s, however, he appeared in only a few films, such as Young Dillinger (1965) and his last film, Coogan's Bluff (1968).

Osterloh was featured in the pilots for two notable television series: Perry Mason and The Untouchables. Filmed in 1956, "The Case of the Moth-Eaten Mink" aired in 1957 as the 13th episode of the legal drama series starring Raymond Burr; Osterloh played a central role as restaurant proprietor Morey Allen. In "The Scarface Mob", the pilot for The Untouchables that aired on Westinghouse Desilu Playhouse in 1959, Osterloh was a member of the Federal squad led by Eliot Ness (Robert Stack). Osterloh also played roles in TV series including Wagon Train, The F.B.I., Ironside, and Hec Ramsey.

Osterloh was married to Harriet Hughes, whom he met while serving in the Army in England.

Osterloh died at 82 years of age in Los Osos, California.

== Filmography ==
- 1948: Incident - James 'Slats' Slattery
- 1948: The Dark Past - Pete
- 1949: Criss Cross - Mr. Nelson (uncredited)
- 1949: I Cheated the Law - Joe Corsi
- 1949: The Undercover Man - Emanuel 'Manny' Zanger
- 1949: City Across the River - Mr. Bannon
- 1949: The Doolins of Oklahoma - Wichita Smith
- 1949: Illegal Entry - Agent Crowthers
- 1949: White Heat - Tommy Ryley (uncredited)
- 1949: Pinky - Police Officer (uncredited)
- 1950: Gun Crazy - Hampton Policeman
- 1950: The Palomino - Sam Drake
- 1950: Harbor of Missing Men - Johnny
- 1950: 711 Ocean Drive - Gizzi
- 1950: A Lady Without Passport - Lt. Lannahan, NYC Cop
- 1950: Right Cross - Totem, Heldon's Manager (uncredited)
- 1950: Southside 1-1000 - Albert
- 1951: The Great Missouri Raid - August
- 1951: New Mexico - Pvt. Parsons
- 1951: The Fat Man - Chuck Fletcher
- 1951: The Prowler - Coroner
- 1951: No Questions Asked - Owney
- 1951: Drums in the Deep South - Sgt. Harper
- 1951: The Day the Earth Stood Still - Major White (uncredited)
- 1951: The Well - Wylie
- 1951: Cave of Outlaws - Blackhack
- 1952: Red Skies of Montana - Mac, Dispatcher (uncredited)
- 1952: Mutiny - Faversham
- 1952: One Minute to Zero - Maj. Davis
- 1952: The Ring - Freddy Jack
- 1953: The Royal African Rifles - Carney
- 1953: Private Eyes - Prof. Damon
- 1953: Wicked Woman - Larry Lowry
- 1953: The Wild One - Ben
- 1954: Riot in Cell Block 11 - The Colonel
- 1954: Johnny Guitar - Sam (uncredited)
- 1955: Seven Angry Men - Lt. Col. Robert E. Lee (uncredited)
- 1955: An Annapolis Story - Midshipman Laisson
- 1955: Violent Saturday - Roy (uncredited)
- 1955: Man with the Gun - Virg Trotter (uncredited)
- 1956: Invasion of the Body Snatchers - Ambulance Driver (uncredited)
- 1956: Star in the Dust - Rigdon
- 1956: Johnny Concho - Duke Lang
- 1956: The Desperados Are in Town - Deputy Sheriff Mike Broome
- 1956: Hot Cars - George Hayman
- 1957: Baby Face Nelson - FBI Agent Johnson
- 1957: Wagon Train S1, E2
- 1958: Fort Massacre - Schwabacker
- 1958: The Case Against Brooklyn - Det. Sgt. Bonney
- 1958: I Bury the Living - Lt. Clayborne
- 1959: The Scarface Mob - Tom Kopka (archive footage)
- 1959: Warlock - Professor (uncredited)
- 1960: Inherit the Wind - Sam (uncredited)
- 1965: Young Dillinger - Federal Agent Baum
- 1966: The Oscar - Reporter at Premiere (uncredited)
- 1967: Warning Shot - Reporter (uncredited)
- 1968: Rosemary's Baby - Mr. Fountain (uncredited)
- 1968: Coogan's Bluff - Deputy (uncredited)

== TV ==
- 1956: Crusader
  - Season 1, Episode 16: "Sharks" - Pete Bresler
  - Season 2, Episode 1: "The Syndicate" - Ben Webber
- 1957: The 20th Century Fox Hour
  - Season 2, Episode 13: "Deadline Decision" - Tom Robinson
- 1957-1959: Perry Mason
  - Season 1, Episode 13: "The Case of the Moth-Eaten Mink" - Morey Allen
  - Season 3, Episode 1: "The Case of the Spurious Sister" - Walter Sprague
- 1957-1964 Wagon Train
  - Season 1, Episode 2: "The Jean LeBec Story" - Pittinger
  - Season 2, Episode 2: "The Juan Ortega Story" - Ransome Jarvis
  - Season 4, Episode 38: "The Don Alvarado Story" - Wilbur Martin
  - Season 6, Episode 36: "The Jim Whitlow Story" - Tom Mason
  - Season 7, Episode 21: "The Andrew Elliott Story" - Jack Hunt
- 1958: Gunsmoke
  - Season 3, Episode 32: "Hanging Man" - Dan Dresslar
- 1959: Bonanza
  - Season 1, Episode 8: "The Philip Diedesheimer Story" - Casey
- 1959-1961: The Untouchables
  - Pilot episode - Agent Tom Kopke
  - Season 2, Episode 25: "Mr. Moon" - Benny Joplin
- 1960: U.S. Marshal
  - Episode: "The Man Who Lived Twice" - Sheriff Jerry Baker
- 1964: The Outer Limits
  - Episode "The Children of Spider County"
- 1967: The Felony Squad
  - Season 1, Episode 29: "The Savage Streets" - Foreman
