= The 39 Steps (1959 film) =

1959 British thriller by Ralph Thomas

- Original British cinema poster
- Directed by: Ralph Thomas
- Screenplay by: Frank Harvey
- Based on: The Thirty-Nine Steps; 1915 novel by John Buchan
- Produced by: Betty E. Box
- Starring: Kenneth More; Taina Elg; Brenda De Banzie; Barry Jones; Reginald Beckwith; Sid James
- Cinematography: Ernest Steward
- Edited by: Alfred Roome
- Music by: Clifton Parker
- Production company: The Rank Organisation
- Distributed by: Rank Film Distributors
- Release date: 12 March 1959
- Running time: 93 minutes
- Country: United Kingdom
- Language: English

The 39 Steps is a 1959 British thriller film directed by Ralph Thomas and starring Kenneth More and Taina Elg. Produced by Betty Box, it is a remake of the 1935 Alfred Hitchcock film, loosely based on the 1915 novel The Thirty-Nine Steps by John Buchan.

In the film, diplomat Richard Hannay returns home to London, only to become inadvertently embroiled in the death of a British spy investigating the head of an organisation planning to sell the secret of a British ballistic missile. Hannay thus travels to Scotland to escape the police, and attempts to complete the spy's work.

It is the first colour version of the Buchan tale, and, unlike the mainly studio-bound original, features extensive location shooting. Several large set pieces (such as Hannay's escape from the train on the Forth Bridge and the music hall finale) and much of the dialogue are taken from the original film. As with the Hitchcock version, the scenario was contemporary rather than the pre-Great War setting of Buchan's original.

== Plot ==
Coming to the assistance of a nanny who is almost killed during a bungled hit-and-run assassination attempt, Richard Hannay is surprised to find that there is no baby in her pram. Curious, he meets her at the Palace Music Hall where she has gone to see the act of Mr Memory. Afterwards, she goes back to Hannay's flat with him, where she reveals that she is a spy working for British Intelligence following a group called "The Thirty-Nine Steps"; all they know about their elusive leader is that he is missing the tip of a finger. The Thirty-Nine Steps are in possession of a set of top-secret plans for "Boomerang", a British ballistic missile project that could tip the balance of power in Europe. She tells Hannay that she must leave for Scotland immediately, but while Hannay is out of the room, she is killed by two hitmen.

Fearing he will be accused of her murder, Hannay decides to continue her mission and catches an ex LNER Class A4 hauled train to Scotland from King's Cross railway station, having evaded the hitmen outside his flat by adopting a milkman disguise.

During the journey, he has a chance encounter with Miss Fisher, a netball coach at a boarding school for girls. He is forced to pretend they are lovers to avoid the police detectives who boarded at Edinburgh. However, Miss Fisher gives him away and Hannay jumps from the stationary train on the Forth Bridge.

He then meets Percy Baker, a helpful ex-convict lorry driver who advises him to stop at "The Gallows", an inn owned by Nelly Lumsden, who was once imprisoned for practising the occult. She helps him pass the police patrols by disguising him in a cycle party (Freewheelers of Clackmannan) she is accommodating and creating a diversion with her husband.

Hannay eventually finds the house of the man he thinks he is looking for, Professor Logan, but finds out that he has been tricked; the man is actually the spy ring's leader. He escapes and informs the police, but is not believed and has to jump out of the police station window. Hannay escapes in the back of a passing sheep transporter. He then poses as a lecturer in a Highland girls' boarding school, coincidentally where Miss Fisher works, and ends up giving a bizarre lecture on "the woods and the wayside in August". Miss Fisher recognises him and he is again taken into custody, but this time by two assassins posing as detectives. After he shouts out to Miss Fisher to telephone Scotland Yard about Boomerang, the assassins are forced to take her with them.

Hannay is handcuffed to Miss Fisher in a Ford Zephyr with the hitmen, who are taking them back to London. A burst tyre gives Hannay his chance to escape, but only having one hand to drive with, he crashes the car, forcing him to wander through the bleak Scottish Highlands handcuffed to Miss Fisher. Eventually they chance upon a bed and breakfast run by Mrs MacDougal. Hannay hides their handcuffed condition and informs her that they are a runaway couple.

While Hannay sleeps Miss Fisher frees herself from the handcuffs but then overhears their pursuers inquiring about them and about The Thirty-Nine Steps. She realises her error and goes back to help Hannay, telling him the final rendezvous for the conspirators.

The finale is back in the Palace Music Hall where Hannay provokes Mr Memory into telling him where "The Thirty-Nine Steps" are, just as the police arrest him. Mr Memory has used his formidable memory to memorise the Boomerang plans. However before he can reveal the espionage conspiracy Memory is shot by the ringleader and the secret is safe.

== Cast ==
- Kenneth More as Richard Hannay
- Taina Elg as Fisher
- Brenda de Banzie as Nellie Lumsden
- Barry Jones as Professor Logan
- Reginald Beckwith as Lumsden
- Faith Brook as Nannie
- Michael Goodliffe as Brown
- James Hayter as Mr Memory
- Duncan Lamont as Kennedy
- Jameson Clark as McDougal
- Andrew Cruickshank as Sheriff
- Leslie Dwyer as milkman
- Betty Henderson as Mrs McDougal
- Joan Hickson as Miss Dobson
- Sid James as Percy
- Brian Oulton as Mr Pringle
- Jeremy Hawk as Palace Theatre compere (uncredited)
- Hal Osmond as Palace Theatre stage manager (uncredited)
- Susan Stranks as second schoolgirl on train (uncredited)
- Marianne Stone as hospital receptionist (uncredited)
- Hilary Tindall as Monica, schoolgirl on train (uncredited)
- Harry Towb as Harold (uncredited)

== Adaptation ==
The film sets Buchan's 1915 novel in a contemporary (1959) setting. As the Rank Organisation owned the rights to Alfred Hitchcock's 1935 black-and-white adaptation, a number of the 1959 film's scenes are based on the earlier production, including the music hall opening, the escape on the Forth Bridge and the addition of a female love interest for Hannay. Director Ralph Thomas stated in an interview that to distance it from Hitchcock's pre-war thriller he tried to produce the film with the feel of a comedy. Andrew Spicer notes that "Critics detected a reassuring period feel to the visual style, with More as the pipe-smoking, sporting gentleman in a flat cap." He notes a contemporary review of Kenneth More "playing Hannay with a kind of tweedy casualness and dare-devil insouciance". Sue Harper suggests that to distance it from the "intractable precedents" of Hitchcock's adaptation, "Minor and unsuccessful adjustments were made." These include changing the scene at a crofter's cottage into a roadside cafe, changing Hannay's address of a political rally into giving a lecture at a girls' school and, in a nod to Buchan's novel, including several encounters with Scottish eccentrics.

== Production ==
Filming was originally scheduled for 1958 but was postponed in January that year due to a drop in cinema attendances.

Kay Kendall was originally announced as the co-star. In July, Rank announced June Allyson would star. This was part of a deliberate policy by Rank to have American stars in order to make the films more appealing in the USA. (Most of More's female co stars around this time were imported.)

By August, however, Finnish actress and dancer Taina Elg was signed. The casting of Taina Elg was unpopular with contemporary critics, who felt her performance to be unconvincing, feeling that "her beauty is frozen by the uncertainties of ignorance, if not of neuroticism". Other players were largely character actors with long associations with Pinewood Studios and producer Betty E. Box.

In addition to the primary cast, the film features a number of small appearances by British actors who were to become well known from their later work, for instance Joan Hickson as a teacher and Brenda de Banzie as a psychic. Bill Simpson and Andrew Cruickshank, both soon to appear together in Doctor Finlay's Casebook, had small roles, in Simpson's case his only film appearance. Peter Vaughan had his first screen appearance in the film, playing a policeman on the train. Sid James, familiar from his work in many other films, appears as a roguish lorry driver who helps Hannay.

=== Filming ===
Filming started 15 September 1958. Interior filming took place primarily at Pinewood Studios, with extensive location filming in Scotland, including North and South Queensferry, Dunblane, Balquhidder, Altskeith and at the Falls of Dochart in Killin, as well as other parts of Stirling and Perthshire such as Brig o' Turk and its 1930s wooden tearoom, which featured as The Gallows inn.

The film also includes a large section at Waverley Station and at Princes Street Station, Edinburgh, on the Forth Bridge and on board a train hauled by an ex-LNER Class A4. The cinematography was by Ernest Steward and it was filmed in Eastmancolor.

=== Music ===
The music was by British film composer Clifton Parker, who composed prolifically for cinema and theatre in this period. The score was conducted by Muir Mathieson. Many of the melodic themes throughout the film derive from pieces performed by the house orchestra during the early music-hall scene, particularly the Mr Memory motif. A review by the National Board of Review of Motion Pictures also makes a comparison between the theatre and the film, noting "The score Clifton Parker has composed for the new version of The 39 Steps has a gay overture which also sets the right mood. It's short, not noisy, has musical wit, and promises comedy, not thrills."

== Reception ==
=== Box office ===
The 39 Steps was the sixth most popular film at the British box office in 1959. According to Kinematograph Weekly the film performed "better than average" at the British box office in 1959.

=== Critical ===
Critically, the film has often been regarded as inferior to Hitchcock's 1935 adaptation, and director Ralph Thomas stated it was not his favourite film. On being asked why he agreed to direct it he stated:

Well, Rank owned it, and I was under contract, and they asked me to do it. So I asked Alfred [Hitchcock] about it, and he said "If you have the chutzpah to do it, you go ahead, my son and do it. You won't do it as well as I did it." And of course he was right. His film was a wonderful picture. I think mine was a piece of effrontery that didn't come off, and on the whole I regretted it.

A number of critics have pointed to the slow pacing of the film, noting a lack of suspense, usually attributed to More's charming but leisurely performance. Comparing it with Hitchcock's version A.H. Waiton writing in 1960 suggested: "the pace, as well as the execution is milder, more civilised and somehow less suspenseful than it seemed previously. Mr Thomas's direction may be at the core of it all, but Kenneth More's polished performance seems lacking in urgency. He is a frowning, somewhat put-upon gent, but certainly not a citizen involved in a life-and-death matter."

Reviewing it more recently for LoveFilm, Mark Walker opined: "As a thriller it's hardly in the same league as North by Northwest, but as a window on life in England and Scotland in the 1950s, this 39 Steps has much to recommend it."

Variety called it "slick, exciting".

Sight and Sound wrote:

Although Frank Harvey's script provides some innovations (the political meeting into which Hannay erupts has become a girls' school lecture introducing a St Trinians touch), it owes far more to the first screen version than to Buchan's novel. The differences of course come with the treatment. Ralph Thomas, the director, intermittently tries for Hitchcock's particular blend of the sinister and the comic; and he pulls out one trick, when a pram blanket is drawn back to reveal not a baby but a pistol, entirely worthy of this tradition. But on the whole he has broadened the story, allowing Kenneth More to play for hearty comedy... Never a subtle film-maker, he concerns himself mainly with keeping the action moving. And this treatment, even though not entirely satisfactory is perhaps now a necessary one.

Filmink magazine argued the film "actually isn’t bad, it just suffers in comparison… because it’s too close to the original and director Ralph Thomas is no Hitchcock. When the film becomes more Kenneth More-ish, it works better and Thomas should have gone the whole hog and really changed it."

== See also ==
- Remakes of films by Alfred Hitchcock
