= Taina Elg =

Finnish actress and dancer (1930–2025)

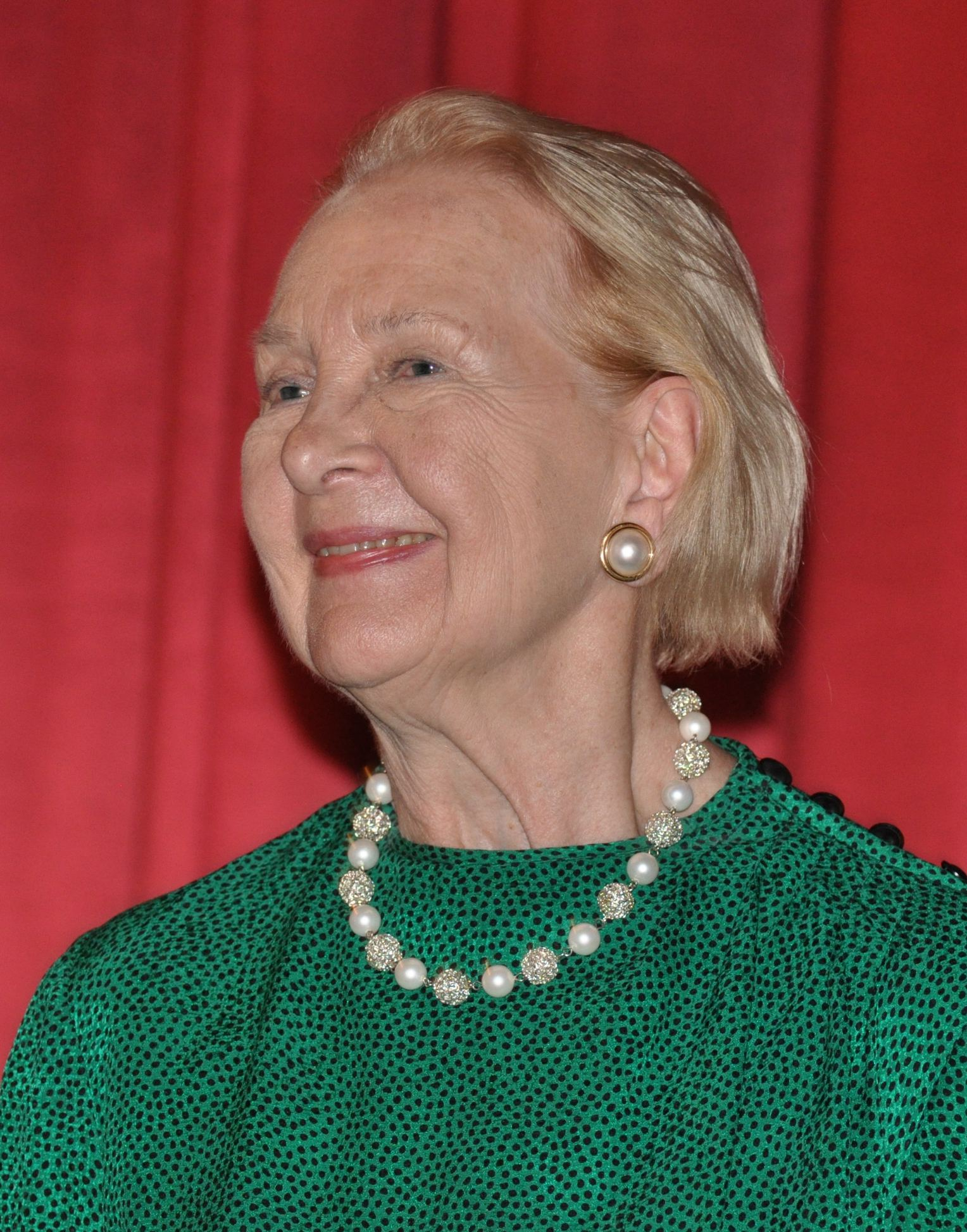
- Elg in 2012
- Born: Taina Elisabeth Elg; 9 March 1930; Helsinki, Finland
- Died: 15 May 2025 (aged 95); Helsinki, Finland
- Citizenship: United States and Finland
- Occupations: Actress, dancer
- Years active: 1941–2006
- Spouses: Carl-Gustav Björkenheim (m. 1953; div. 1960) Rocco Caporale (m. 1985; died 2008)
- Children: Raoul Björkenheim

Taina Elisabeth Elg (9 March 1930 – 15 May 2025) was a Finnish and American actress and dancer. She appeared on stage, television and in film.

== Early life ==
Elg was born on 9 March 1930 in Helsinki, and raised in Turku by her parents, Åke Elg (né Ludwig), a Finnish pianist, and Helena Doroumova, who was of Russian descent.

== Career ==
Elg was signed to a seven-year contract to Metro-Goldwyn-Mayer in the mid-1950s. In 1957, she won the Golden Globe for the Foreign Newcomer Award – Female. She won another Golden Globe in 1958 for Best Motion Picture Actress – Musical/Comedy for her performance in Les Girls, tying with her co-star, Kay Kendall.

In 1958, she was nominated for a Golden Laurel as Top New Female Personality. In 1959, she starred alongside Kenneth More in The 39 Steps.

In 1975, she was nominated for a Tony Award for her performance as Donna Lucia D'Alvadorez in Where's Charley?. She appeared in the original Broadway production of Nine as Guido Contini's mother. In 1989, she had the title role as Lea in Chéri, from a Colette novel as adapted by Anita Loos. In 1980, she played Dr. Ingrid Fischer on CBS daytime drama soap opera Guiding Light. From 1980 to 1982, she played Olympia Buchanan, first wife of tycoon Asa Buchanan, on the ABC soap opera One Life to Live. Her character, held prisoner by Asa for months, had a memorable death sequence, falling over a balcony at a costume party.

== Personal life ==
Her son by her first marriage to Carl-Gustav Björkenheim, which ended in divorce in 1960, is the jazz guitarist Raoul Björkenheim. In 1985, Elg married Rocco Caporale, an Italian-born educator and professor of sociology. Elg lived for a long time on the Upper East Side, in Manhattan, in New York City, but later returned to Finland. Elg was an American and Finnish dual citizen.

== Death ==
Elg died at a nursing home in Helsinki, on 15 May 2025, at the age of 95. She was buried in the Orthodox cemetery in Helsinki, next to her mother.

== Filmography ==
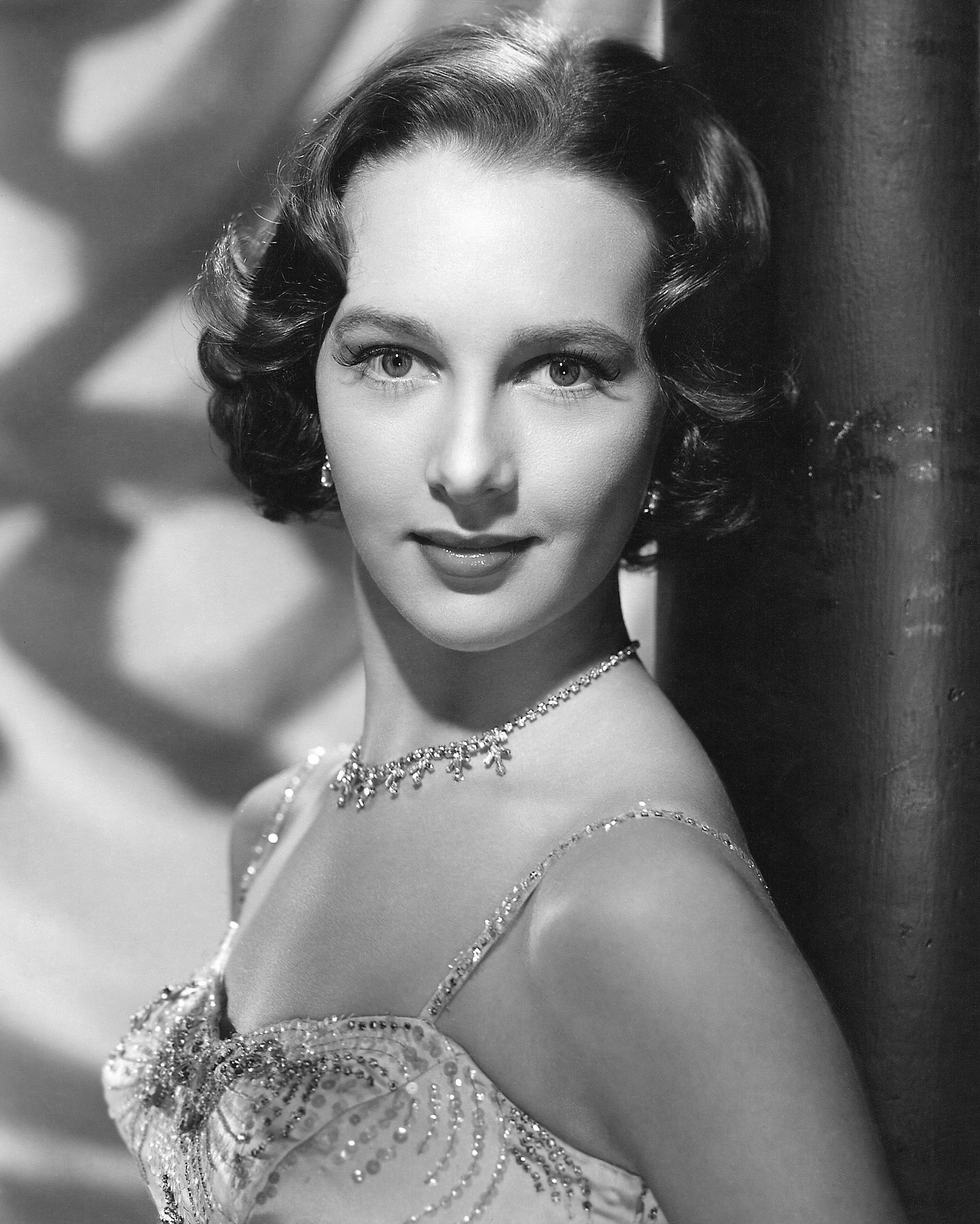
Taina Elg in 1955.

- The Prodigal (1955)
- Diane (1956)
- Gaby (1956)
- Les Girls (1957)
- Imitation General (1958)
- The 39 Steps (1959)
- Watusi (1959)
- The Bacchantes (1961)
- Hercules in New York (1970)
- Liebestraum (1991)
- The Mirror Has Two Faces (1996)
- Kummelin Jackpot (2006)

== Television ==
- Wagon Train "The Countess Baranof Story" (1960)
- Guiding Light (1980)
- One Life to Live (1980–81)
- The Edge of Night (1984)
- Loving (1993)

== Stage appearances ==
- Irma la Douce (U.S. national tour)
- Look to the Lilies
- Two By Two (U.S. national tour)
- Nine
- Where's Charley?
- The Utter Glory of Morrissey Hall
- A Little Night Music (in Australia)
- Chéri (off-Broadway, New York)
- Titanic (U.S. national tour)
