= The Dark Past =

1948 film by Rudolph Maté

- Theatrical release poster
- Directed by: Rudolph Maté
- Written by: Malvin Wald (adaptation); Oscar Saul (adaptation)
- Screenplay by: Philip MacDonald; Michael Blankfort; Albert Duffy
- Based on: Blind Alley; 1935 play by James Warwick
- Produced by: Buddy Adler
- Starring: William Holden; Nina Foch; Lee J. Cobb
- Cinematography: Joseph Walker
- Edited by: Viola Lawrence
- Music by: George Duning
- Color process: Black and white
- Production company: Columbia Pictures
- Distributed by: Columbia Pictures
- Release date: December 22, 1948 (New York City)
- Running time: 74 minutes
- Country: United States
- Language: English

The Dark Past is a 1948 American film noir psychological thriller film starring William Holden, Nina Foch, and Lee J. Cobb. Directed by Rudolph Maté, the Columbia Pictures release is a remake of Blind Alley (1939), also released by Columbia, and based on a play by American dramatist James Warwick.

== Plot ==
Police psychiatrist Dr. Andrew Collins tells a detective that he believes that he can help to turn a young suspect away from crime. Through an extended flashback he illustrates his claim with the story of how he came to work for the police.

While Collins (at the time a college professor), his wife, and son head to their vacation cabin, prison escapee and convicted murderer Al Walker and his small gang flee towards the very same secluded cove. Along the way Walker gratuitously shoots the warden he had held hostage in the back, raising eyebrows around him.

Collins is entertaining three guests when Walker, his girlfriend Betty, and two gunmen break in and hold everyone hostage while waiting for a pickup by boat. With the servants tied in the basement and the others upstairs guarded by Betty and the gangmen, Collins observes Walker's behavior downstairs closely, explaining that his profession has trained him to cure.

When Fred Linder, a colleague of Collins, comes to deliver a hunting rifle, he tells Collins about the prison escape but notices that someone is hiding behind a curtain. Pretending to leave, Linder grabs the rifle, but Walker struggles with him, wounding Linder. Throughout, Collins has repeatedly noticed that Walker, an extremely unintelligent, volatile man, is nonetheless drawn to some of his books on psychoanalysis and the subconscious. Betty, who is told to watch Collins while Walker fitfully sleeps, tells the professor that Walker is prone to nightmares (visualized in negative film images) where he is standing under a leaking umbrella with a paralyzed hand and trapped behind bars.

When Walker awakens, Collins suggests analyzing his dreams, and Walker agrees. With Collins' guidance, Walker remembers a scene from his childhood where he hid under a table in a bar and witnessed his father being shot to death by police. The trauma was intensified because the young Walker had told the police where to find him, and because the boy's hand was covered with his father's blood, which leaked through the table above him. Collins tells Walker that recovering the lost memory means that his nightmares will not return and that he will no longer be able to kill.

Meanwhile, one of the servants managed to escape and notify the police. The cabin is surrounded. Walker seems ready to shoot it out, but finds that he cannot pull the trigger, even though his fingers are no longer paralyzed.

The flashback ends and the police detective agrees to let Collins analyze the young suspect they had been discussing.

== Cast ==
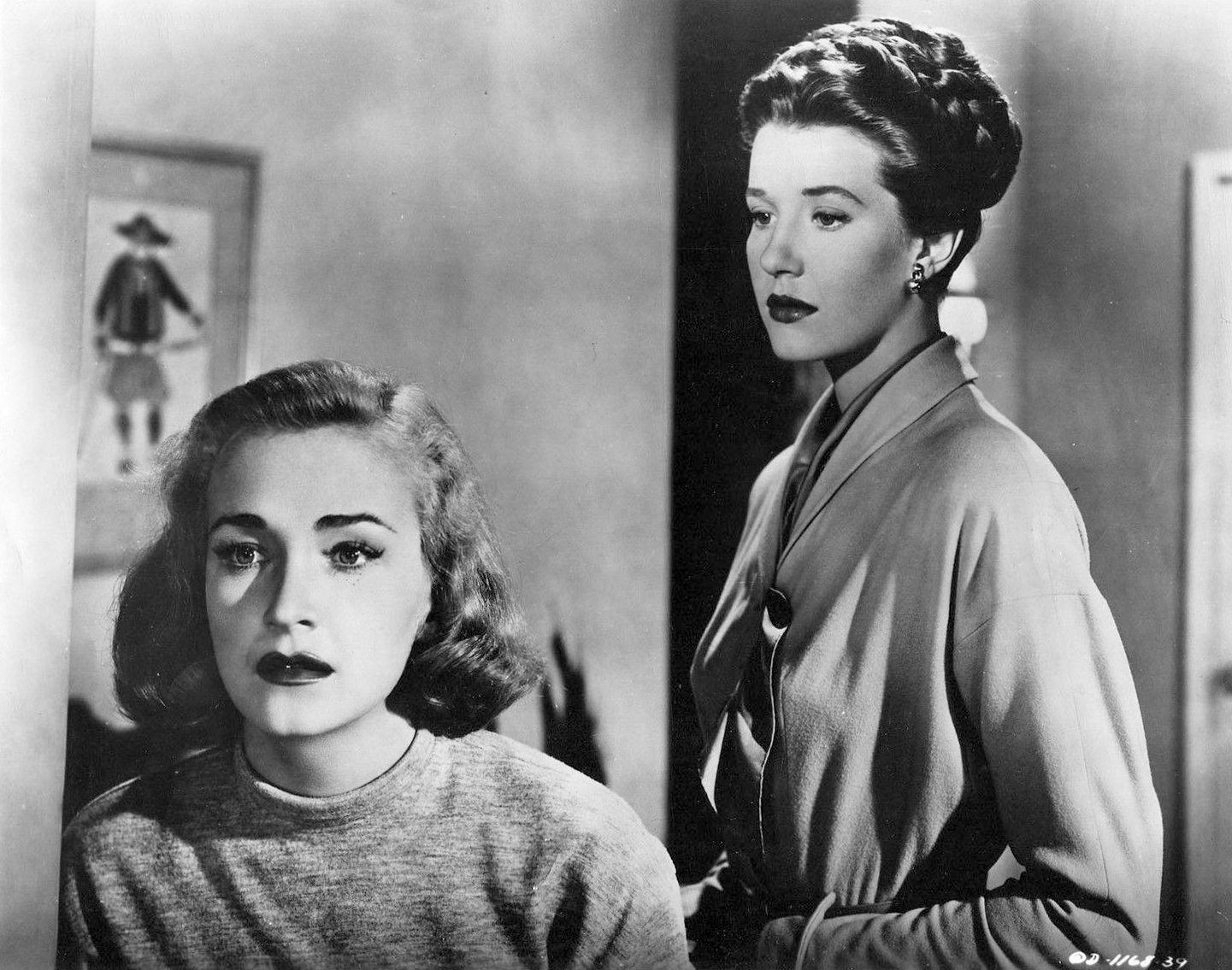
Nina Foch and Lois Maxwell in The Dark Past

- William Holden as Al Walker
- Nina Foch as Betty
- Lee J. Cobb as Dr. Andrew Collins
- Adele Jergens as Laura Stevens
- Stephen Dunne as Owen Talbot
- Lois Maxwell as Ruth Collins
- Berry Kroeger as Mike
- Steven Geray as Prof. Fred Linder
- Wilton Graff as Frank Stevens
- Robert Osterloh as Pete
- Kathryn Card as Nora
- Ellen Corby as Agnes

== Reception ==
=== Critical response ===
When the film was released the film critic at The New York Times gave it a positive review, writing: "William Holden is excellent as the dream-shackled gunman, who is at once ruthless, nervous and explosively dangerous but who grudgingly complies with the doctor's 'screwball' tactics. As counterpoint is Lee J. Cobb's equally fine portrait of the unflustered scientist who is dedicated to 'curing people not killing them.' And, Nina Foch does a competently restrained job as the gangster's moll, who learns he's suffering from an Oedipus complex. The doctor's house guests, including Steven Geray, Adele Jergens and Wilton Graff, and their captors, especially Berry Kroeger, give unobtrusive but neat characterizations. Neat, too, is the word for this small but well-made Christmas package."

In 2001, film critic Dennis Schwartz gave the film a mixed review stating the film was well acted, but called the film "pure Hollywood hokum."
