= John Hoyt =

American actor (1904–1991)

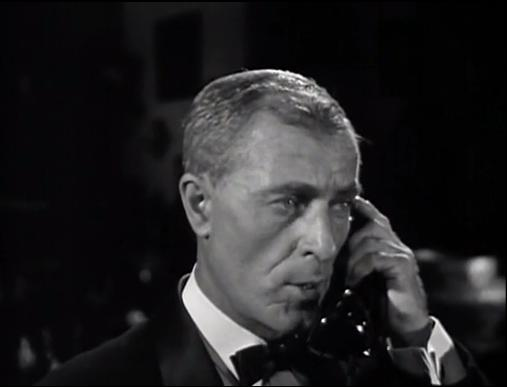
- Hoyt in The Big Combo (1955)
- Born: John McArthur Hoysradt; October 5, 1904; Bronxville, New York, U.S.
- Died: September 15, 1991 (aged 86); Santa Cruz, California, U.S.
- Other name: John Hoysradt
- Education: Yale University (BA, MA)
- Occupation: Actor
- Years active: 1930–1987
- Spouses: Marion Virginia Burns (m. 1935; div. 1960) († 1962) Dorothy Marion Oltman (m. 1961) († 1997)
- Children: 1

John Hoyt (born John McArthur Hoysradt; October 5, 1904 – September 15, 1991) was an American actor. He began his acting career on Broadway, later appearing in numerous films and television series.

He is perhaps best known for his roles in the films The Lawless (1950), When Worlds Collide (1951), Julius Caesar (1953), Blackboard Jungle (1955), Spartacus (1960), Cleopatra (1963), The Time Travelers (1964), and television series that included The Twilight Zone (1959), The Outer Limits (1964), the 1965 pilot for Star Trek, and Gimme a Break! (1981–87).

== Early life ==
Hoyt was born John McArthur Hoysradt in Bronxville, New York, the son of Warren J. Hoysradt, an investment banker, and his wife, Ethel Hoysradt (née Wolf). He attended the Hotchkiss School and Yale University, where he served on the editorial board of campus humor magazine The Yale Record. He received bachelor's and master's degrees from Yale. He worked as a history instructor at the Groton School for two years.

== Stage ==
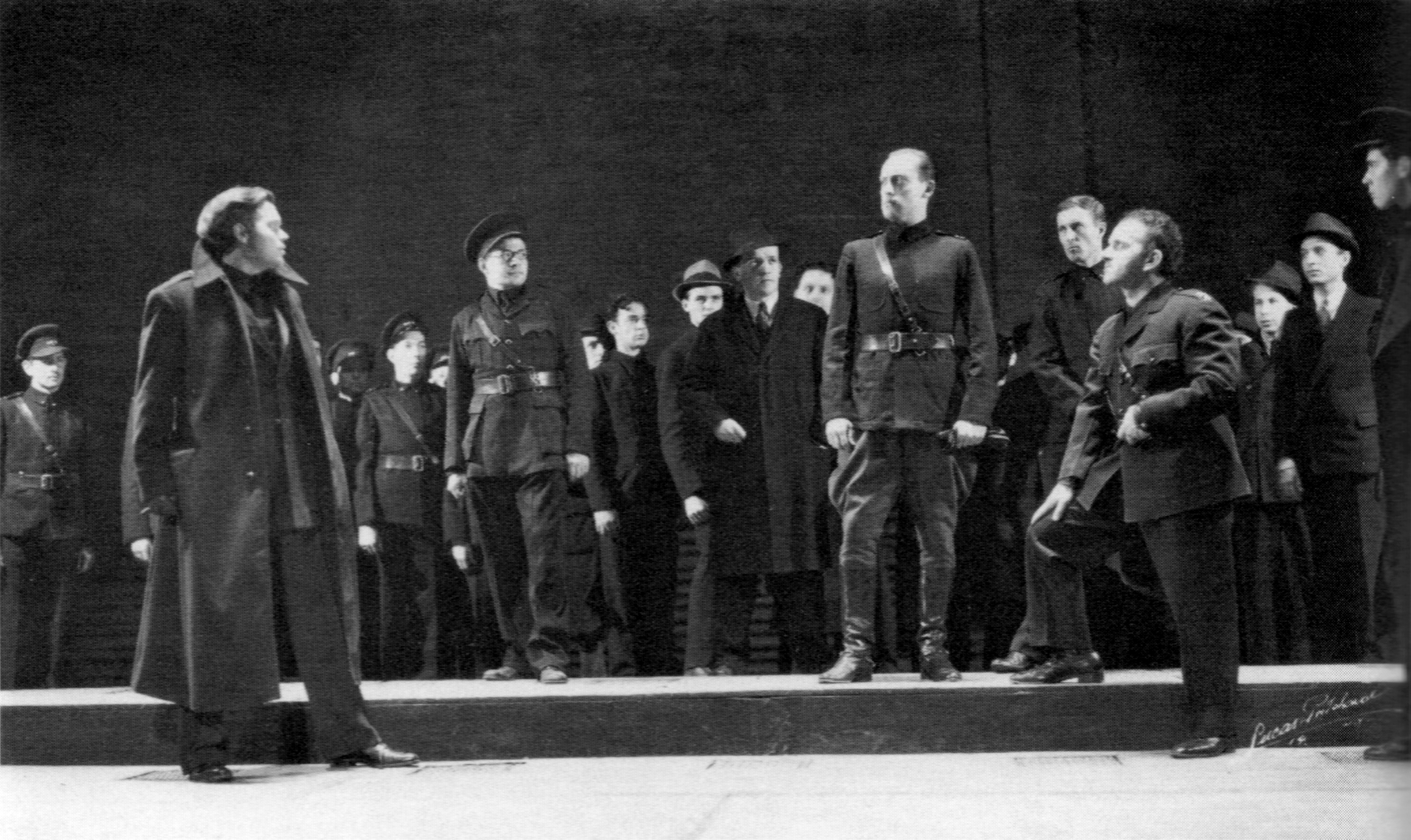
Hoyt (fifth from right) as Decius Brutus in the Mercury Theatre production of Caesar (1937)

Hoyt made his Broadway debut in 1931 in William Bolitho's play Overture. Some of his other Broadway credits in the early 1930s include Miracle at Verdun (1930), Lean Harvest (1931), and Clear All Wires (1932). He also performed with several regional theater groups, and then joined Orson Welles's Mercury Theatre in 1937; he remained a member of the troupe until he moved to Hollywood in 1945 after his army service. Hoyt continued to perform regularly in Broadway productions throughout the 1930s and into the 1940s. In this period, he was cast in a range of plays, such as Valley Forge (1934), Ziegfeld Follies of 1936 (1935), The Masque of Kings (1936), Storm Over Patsy (1936), and Caesar (1937, director Orson Welles). He also worked as a stand-up comedian, sometimes both acting and doing comedy on the same day. His impersonation of Noël Coward was so remarkable that he was hired for the original cast of the Broadway comedy The Man Who Came to Dinner (1939), in which he played Beverley Carlton.

== Film ==
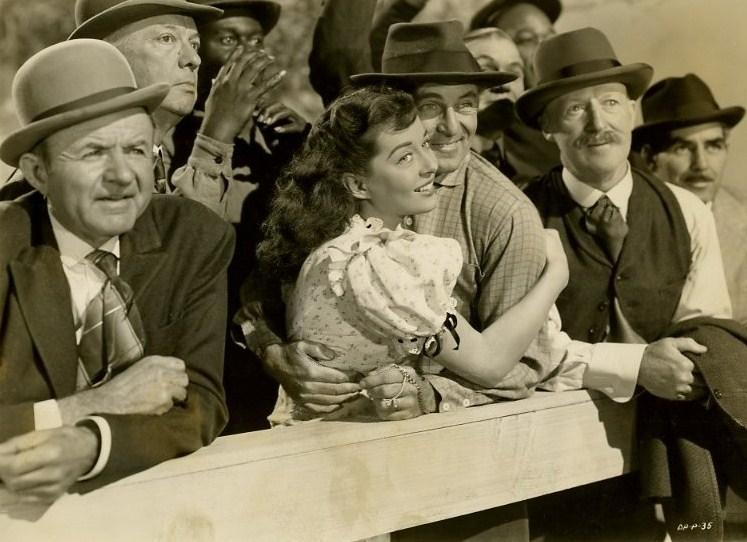
Gail Russell and John Hoyt (center) in The Great Dan Patch (1949)

Hoyt shortened his surname in 1945, the year before his film debut in O.S.S. He became a familiar face in film noir and played the strict Principal Warneke in the 1955 film Blackboard Jungle, starring Glenn Ford. He played an industrialist in the 1951 film When Worlds Collide. Hoyt appeared in one Shakespearean film: MGM's Julius Caesar, reprising the role of Decius Brutus (or Decimus Junius Brutus Albinus), whom he had played in the 1937 Mercury Theatre production. In 1952, he played Cato in Androcles and the Lion. In 1953, he portrayed Elijah in the biblical film Sins of Jezebel. He had featured roles in the big-budget sixties epics Spartacus and Cleopatra.

== Television ==
=== Regular cast roles ===
Hoyt played Colonel Barker on The Adventures of Rin-Tin-Tin, Grandpa Stanley Kanisky, Dolph Sweet's onscreen father, on Gimme a Break!, J.L. Patterson on Hey, Mulligan, Martin Peyton in Return to Peyton Place, and Dr. Kievoy on Tom, Dick and Mary.

=== Guest appearances ===
On Gunsmoke, in a 1957 episode titled "Bureaucrat", Hoyt played the part of Rex Propter, a government agent sent to Dodge City, Kansas, to determine why the town had such a bad reputation for gun violence. He made five guest appearances on Perry Mason, including in the role of defendant Joseph Harrison in the 1958 episode "The Case of the Prodigal Parent", as C. Philip Reynolds in the 1958 episode "The Case of the Curious Bride", as the title character and defendant William Harper Caine in the 1961 episode "The Case of the Resolute Reformer", and as Darwin Norland in the 1963 episode "The Case of the Libelous Locket". In the 1964 episode "The Case of the Wednesday Woman", Hoyt played Thomas Webber, part owner of a jewelry business. He guest-starred, as well, on Crossroads.

Hoyt was cast in 1958 as rancher Clete Barron in the episode "Trouble in Paradise Valley" of Frontier Doctor. Also in 1958, Hoyt was cast as a clothier in Leave It To Beaver's "Wally's New Suit" episode. In 1958 and 1959, he performed in two episodes of Richard Diamond, Private Detective, appearing as Burnison in "The George Dale Case" and as Harding, Sr. in "Murder at the Mansion". Later in 1959, on Laramie, Hoyt portrayed mentally troubled military officer Colonel Brandon in "The General Must Die". The same year, he was cast as Antoine Rigaud in the episode "About Roger Mowbray" on Riverboat.

In 1959, Hoyt was cast as John Cavanagh in "The Mourning Cloak", an episode of the crime drama Bourbon Street Beat. About this time, he guest-starred on The Alaskans and Pony Express. Also in 1959, Hoyt was cast in an episode ("Three Legged Terror") of The Rifleman, playing the character Gus Fremont, the cruel uncle of Johnny Clover (Dennis Hopper). He returned to The Rifleman in late 1960 as Civil War veteran Captain Josiah Perry, a man deranged by grief over the loss of his son, in the episode "The Martinet". In 1960 and 1961, he appeared in the episodes "Burnett's Woman" and "The Salvation of Killer McFadden" of The Roaring 20's. Hoyt also appeared on The Untouchables in the 1960 episode "The Big Squeeze".

Hoyt guest-starred on at least three sitcoms: Bringing Up Buddy, Hogan's Heroes, and Petticoat Junction (in the 1966 episode "Hooterville Valley Project", as Mr. Fletcher). He was cast as Dr. Philip Boyce in the pilot episode of Star Trek ("The Cage"), and he appeared twice during the second season of The Twilight Zone as both the titular character in the classic episode "Will the Real Martian Please Stand Up?" and as Dr. Loren in the episode "The Lateness of the Hour". He appeared as KAOS agent Conrad Bunny in "Our Man in Toyland" on Get Smart, as General Beeker in "Hail to the Chief" on Voyage to the Bottom of the Sea, and as Dr. Mendoza in "I Was a Teenage Monster" on The Monkees. He guest-starred as Colonel Hollis in "Military School" on The Beverly Hillbillies. He appeared twice in the first season of The Munsters, in episodes 12 ("Sleeping Cutie") and 35 ("Herman's Happy Valley").

In 1964, Hoyt appeared in three episodes of The Outer Limits, most notably "The Bellero Shield". He played the role of an extraterrestrial with large eyes who says, "In all the universes, in all the unities beyond the universes, all who have eyes have eyes that speak." Less than two weeks after this episode's broadcast, alleged alien abductees Betty and Barney Hill provided a description of their alien abductors. Skeptic Martin Kottmeyer notes that the description is notably similar to Hoyt's appearance as the extraterrestrial on the show.

He was also a guest player in "The 14-Karat Gold Trombone" and "The Interview" episodes of The George Burns and Gracie Allen Show. Because of his stern demeanor, the writers had him play opposite to the befuddled way strangers usually reacted to Gracie Allen's convoluted behavior. In the teleplay of "The Interview", Hoyt simply would not tolerate Gracie's antics and immediately removed himself from the room—twice.

He incarnated Bertrand Russell and Voltaire in episodes of Steve Allen's PBS series Meeting of Minds in the late 1970s. He appeared as Sire Domra in episode 21 "Baltar's Escape" of Battlestar Galactica.

== Personal life and death ==
Hoyt was married twice, first to Marian Virginia Burns from 1935 to 1960, with whom he had one child, and later to Dorothy Oltman Haveman from 1961 to 1991, when he died of lung cancer in Santa Cruz, California.

== Complete filmography ==
- O.S.S. (1946) as Colonel Paul Meister
- My Favorite Brunette (1947) as Dr. Lundau
- The Unfaithful (1947) as Detective Lieutenant Reynolds
- Brute Force (1947) as Spencer
- To the Ends of the Earth (1948) as George C. Shannon
- Winter Meeting (1948) as Stacy Grant
- Sealed Verdict (1948) as General Otto Steigmann
- The Decision of Christopher Blake (1948) as Mr. Caldwell
- The Bribe (1949) as Gibbs
- The Lady Gambles (1949) as Dr. Rojac
- The Great Dan Patch (1949) as Ben Lathrop
- Trapped (1949) as John Downey
- Everybody Does It (1949) as Wilkins
- The Marionette Mystery (1950) (TV movie)
- Outside the Wall (1950) as Jack Bernard
- The Lawless (1950) as Ed Ferguson
- The Company She Keeps (1951) as Judge Kendall
- Inside Straight (1951) as Flutey Johnson
- Quebec (1951) as Father Antoine
- New Mexico (1951) as Sergeant Harrison
- Lost Continent (1951) as Michael Rostov
- The Desert Fox: The Story of Rommel (1951) as Field Marshal Wilhelm Keitel (uncredited)
- When Worlds Collide (1951) as Sydney Stanton
- Loan Shark (1952) as Vince Phillips
- Androcles and the Lion (1952) as Cato
- The Black Castle (1952) as Count Steiken
- Julius Caesar (1953) as Decius Brutus
- Sins of Jezebel (1953) as Elijah / Narrator
- Casanova's Big Night (1954) as Maggiorin
- The Student Prince (1954) as Prime Minister
- Désirée (1954) as Talleyrand
- For the Defense (1954) (TV movie)
- The Big Combo (1955) as Nils Dreyer
- Blackboard Jungle (1955) as Mr. Warneke
- The Purple Mask (1955) as Rochet
- Moonfleet (1955) as Magistrate Maskew
- The Girl in the Red Velvet Swing (1955) as William Travers Jerome
- Trial (1955) as Ralph Castillo
- Alarm (1956) (TV movie)
- The Conqueror (1956) as Shaman
- Forever, Darling (1956) as Bill Finlay
- Mohawk (1956) as Butler
- The Come On (1956) as Harold King, alias Harley Kendrick
- Wetbacks (1956) as Steve Bodine
- Death of a Scoundrel (1956) as Mr. O'Hara
- Sierra Stranger (1957) as Sheriff
- God Is My Partner (1957) as Gordon Palmer
- Baby Face Nelson (1957) as Samuel F. Parker
- The Beast of Budapest (1958) as Professor Ernst Tolnai
- Attack of the Puppet People (1958) as Mr. Franz
- Steve Canyon (1958) (Episode: "Operation Jettison") as Atterbury
- The Ten Commandments (1959) (TV movie)
- Riot in Juvenile Prison (1959)
- Curse of the Undead (1959) as Dr. John Carter
- Never So Few (1959) as Colonel Reed
- Spartacus (1960) as Caius
- The Twilight Zone (1961, S2E28, Will The Real Martian Please Stand Up) as Mr. Ross the Martian, a businessman with 3 arms
- Alfred Hitchcock Presents (1961) (Season 6 Episode 15: "Summer Shade") as Reverend
- Merrill's Marauders (1962) as General Joseph Stilwell
- The Virginian (1963) (Episode: "To Make This Place Remember") as Judge Harper
- Boston Terrier (1963) (TV movie)
- Cleopatra (1963) as Cassius
- X: The Man with the X-ray Eyes (1963) as Dr. Willard Benson
- Perry Mason (1964) (Season 7, Episode 13: "The Case of the Wednesday Woman") as Thomas Webber
- The Alfred Hitchcock Hour (1964) (Season 3 Episode 7: "The McGregor Affair") as Dr. Knox
- The Glass Cage (1964) as Lieutenant Max Westerman
- The Time Travelers (1964) as Varno
- Two on a Guillotine (1965) as Attorney Carl Vickers
- Memorandum for a Spy (1965) (TV movie)
- Young Dillinger (1965) as Dr. Wilson
- Operation C.I.A. (1965) as Wells
- Gunpoint (1966) as Mayor Osborne
- Duel at Diablo (1966) as Chata
- Star Trek: The Original Series (1966) as Dr. Philip Boyce in S1:E11-E12, "The Menagerie"
- T.H.E. Cat (1967) (Episode: "The Blood-Red Night") as Carver Parmiter
- Winchester 73 (1967) (TV movie)
- Panic in the City (1968) as Dr. Milton Becker
- Hogan's Heroes (1969) as General Von Behler
- The Intruders (1970) (TV movie)
- Welcome Home, Johnny Bristol (1972) (TV movie)
- Flesh Gordon (1974) as Professor Gordon
- Planet of the Apes (1974) Prefect Barlow, 2 episodes (TV series)
- The Winds of Kitty Hawk (1978) (TV movie) as Professor Samuel Langley
- In Search of Historic Jesus (1979) (Documentary) as Synagogue Man #1
- A Great Ride (1979)
- Nero Wolfe (1979) (TV movie)
- Gimme a Break! (1981-1987) (TV series) as Grandpa Stanley Kanisky
- The Forty Days of Musa Dagh (1982) as General Waggenheim
- Desperately Seeking Susan (1985) as Space Commander
- Alvin Goes Back to School (1986) (TV movie) as Mr. Quickstudy
