= The Amboy Dukes (novel) =

1947 novel by Irving Shulman

Cover of the 1947 first edition, the subtitle being "A novel of youth and crime in Brooklyn"

The Amboy Dukes is a 1947 novel by Irving Shulman, his first.

The novel concerns the misadventures of a 1940s Jewish street gang of young toughs based on Amboy Street in the working class Brownsville section of Brooklyn (Brownsville, from its founding into the 1950s, was a primarily Jewish neighborhood). The gang, characters, and most of the story are fictional, but a key event of the novel – the murder of a high school teacher by two gang members – was based on an actual case.

The Amboy Dukes was considered somewhat outré, unsavory, and shocking for its time, as it depicts its teenage juvenile delinquent protagonists fighting, smoking marijuana reefers, cutting class, using foul language, carrying homemade zip guns, having sex, abusing girls, and being generally vicious. It was sometimes banned from schools.

== Later editions ==
The hardback first edition featured an anodyne line drawing on its cover. Following editions, however, were in paperback and featured various lurid scenes.

== Legacy ==
The book sold five million copies in the 1940s and 1950s and was made into a 1949 movie City Across the River.

Amboy Dukes characters appear in Shulman's next two novels. Cry Tough (1949) has Amboy Duke Mitch Wolf return from prison and get involved with organized crime. In The Big Brokers (1951), Mitch and former Dukes Bull and Larry get deep into syndicate operations in Las Vegas. Eighteen years later in 1973, Shulman published his last novel, The Devil's Knee, which feature Larry and Bull eighteen years later, at first retired from crime and living straight, but forced by the mob to get involved in various escapades.

The novel inspired the name of the 1960s–1970s American rock band The Amboy Dukes, after bandleader Ted Nugent, unfamiliar with the book, took the name from a defunct Detroit band because he liked it. A mid-to-late 1960s British band from Nottingham was also named Amboy Dukes. An actual Brownsville street gang of the 1950s named themselves the Amboy Kings.
