= King Dinosaur =

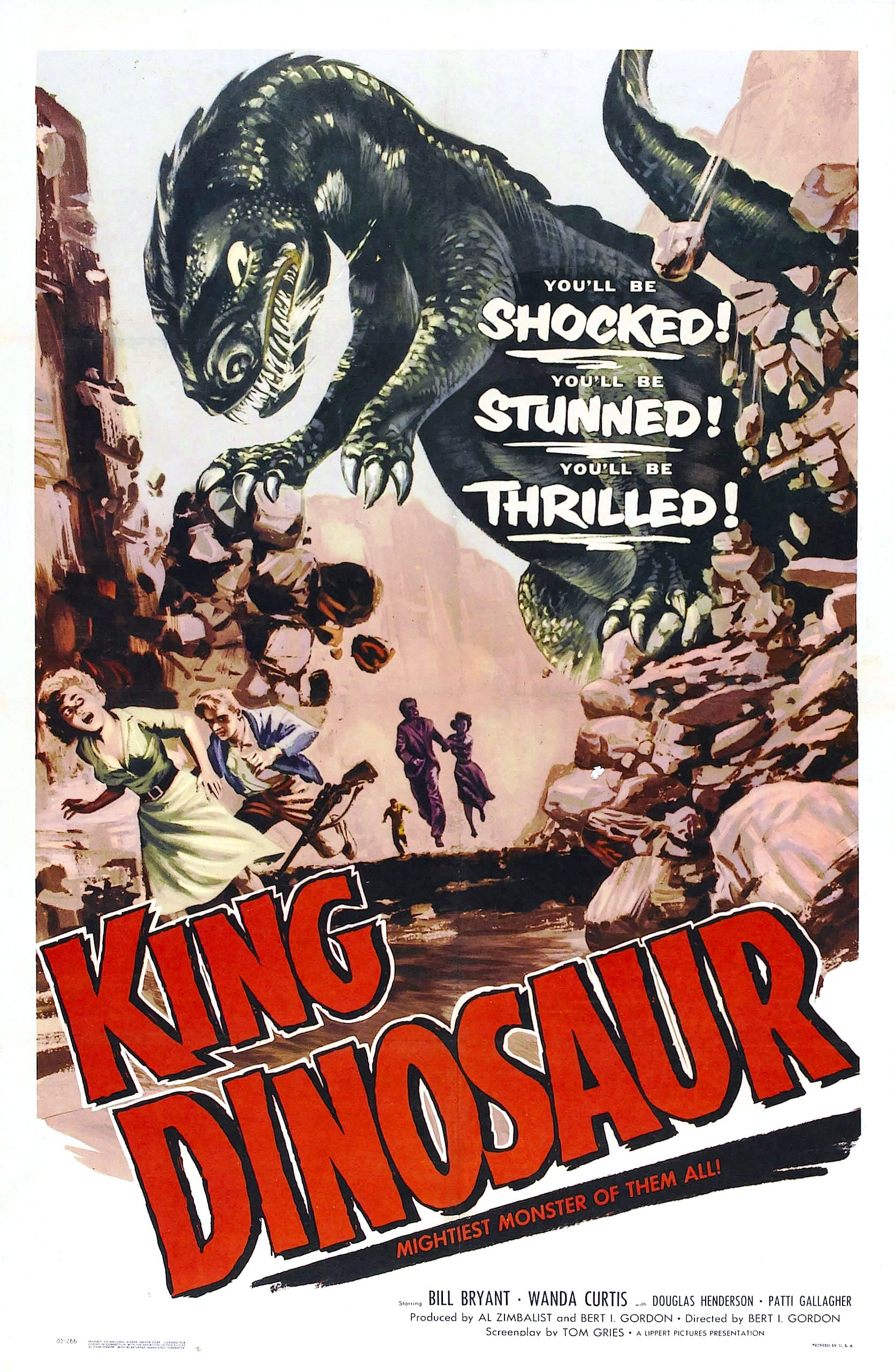
- Theatrical release poster
- Directed by: Bert I. Gordon
- Written by: Bert I. Gordon; Tom Gries; Al Zimbalist
- Produced by: Bert I. Gordon
- Starring: William Bryant; Wanda Curtis; Douglas Henderson; Patti Gallagher
- Cinematography: Gordon Avil
- Edited by: Jack Cornall
- Music by: Louis Palange
- Distributed by: Lippert Pictures
- Release date: June 17, 1955
- Running time: 63 minutes
- Country: United States
- Language: English
- Budget: $15,000 (estimated)
- Box office: $55,000

King Dinosaur is a 1955 American science fiction film starring William Bryant and Wanda Curtis with narration by Marvin Miller. It was co-written, produced, and directed by Bert I. Gordon, in his directorial debut. King Dinosaur was released on June 15, 1955 on a double feature with The Beast with a Million Eyes (1955). It was also distributed in some regions as a double feature with the 1955 Western Five Guns West starring Dorothy Malone.

== Plot ==
Five years in the future (1960), four scientists (zoologist Dr. Richard Gordon, geologist Dr. Nora Pierce, medical specialist Dr. Ralph Martin, and chemist Dr. Patricia Bennett) are selected as astronauts to travel to an ancient planet called Nova that has just entered Earth's Solar System. The crew begins studying the planet to see if it is suitable for a possible Earth colony. After first discovering normal Earth animals such as a kinkajou which they refer to as a lemur, crows which they call vultures, and an alligator (the prehistoric species Diplocynodon), they soon encounter and battle giant insects, an enormous snake (Gigantophis), and prehistoric mammals such as a cave bear, a mastodon, and a glyptodont.

Richard and Nora paddle a raft out to an island and are trapped in a cave by prehistoric reptiles, even a Tyrannosaurus rex (portrayed by a green iguana). They fire off a signal flare. Back on the mainland near their spaceship, Ralph and Patricia see the distress signal, grab the auxiliary nuclear power supply and paddle their raft out to the island to rescue Richard and Nora. Before they leave the island, they set the power supply to "unharness" in 30 minutes and leave it on the island. After encountering more prehistoric creatures, they reach their spaceship. The power supply blows up the island in a nuclear mushroom cloud, rendering the "King Dinosaur" and the other dinosaurs of Nova extinct.

== Cast ==
- William Bryant as Dr. Ralph Martin
- Wanda Curtis as Dr. Patricia Bennett
- Douglas Henderson as Dr. Richard Gordon
- Patti Gallagher as Dr. Nora Pierce
- Marvin Miller as Narrator

== Production ==
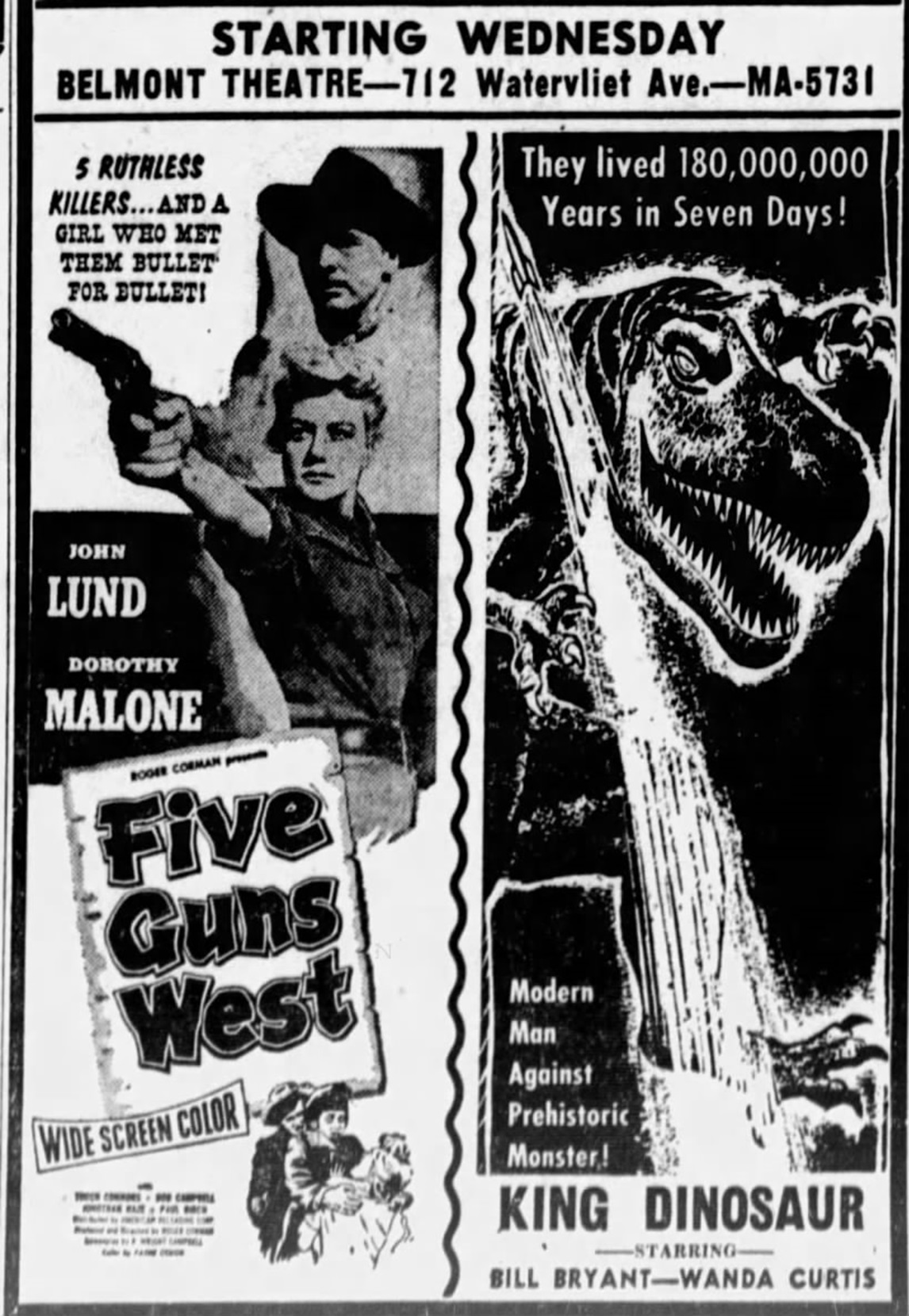
Advertisement from 1955 for King Dinosaur and co-feature, Five Guns West

Filming started in September 1954. The film was directed over a seven-day period by Bert I. Gordon and was Gordon's debut. The camera and other pieces of equipment were borrowed and the cast worked for deferred salaries.

The scene of the attacking mammoth was stock footage recycled from the film One Million B.C.. There were only four actors in this film. The rest of the band and soldiers were just military stock footage, as was the footage of the atomic bomb explosions.

== Mystery Science Theater 3000 ==
The film was featured in a second-season episode of Mystery Science Theater 3000 in December 1990.

== Reception ==
TV Guide gave the movie one out of five stars, stating that the quickness of the movie shooting shows. Film historian Leonard Maltin rated the movie 0 of 4 stars, describing it as "First and worst of director Gordon's many 1950s sci-fi films .... Boring, silly, and awesomely cheap ...."

== See also ==
- List of films featuring dinosaurs
- Planet of Dinosaurs, 1977 film with a similar premise
