= Baby Face Nelson (1957 film) =

1957 film by Don Siegel

- Theater release lobby card
- Directed by: Don Siegel
- Written by: Robert Adler
- Screenplay by: Irving Shulman; Daniel Mainwaring
- Based on: story by Irving Shulman
- Produced by: Al Zimbalist
- Starring: Mickey Rooney; Carolyn Jones; Cedric Hardwicke; Leo Gordon; Anthony Caruso; Jack Elam; John Hoyt
- Cinematography: Hal Mohr
- Edited by: Leon Barsha
- Music by: Van Alexander
- Production company: Fryman Enterprises
- Distributed by: United Artists
- Release date: December 11, 1957
- Running time: 85 minutes
- Country: United States
- Language: English
- Budget: $250,000
- Box office: $1.25 million (US rentals)

Baby Face Nelson is a 1957 American film noir crime film based on the real-life 1930s gangster, directed by Don Siegel, co-written by Daniel Mainwaring—who also wrote the screenplay for Siegel's 1956 sci-fi thriller Invasion of the Body Snatchers—and starring Mickey Rooney, Carolyn Jones, Cedric Hardwicke, Leo Gordon as Dillinger, Anthony Caruso, Jack Elam, John Hoyt and Elisha Cook Jr.

== Plot ==
Chicago mob boss Rocca manages to get Lester Gillis sprung from jail in Joliet. His motive is to have Gillis kill a labor organizer, but Gillis refuses, preferring to work with Rocca's gang on robberies instead. He meets mob moll Sue Nelson and they start a relationship. He is relaxing, alone in his hotel room, when cops burst in, finding a gun Rocca has planted to frame Gillis for the labor leader's murder. Gillis vows revenge, escapes from the cops with Sue's help, then guns down Rocca and two henchmen. He adopts Sue's surname as an alias.

In a holdup at a pharmacy, Gillis is winged by a gunshot. He goes to Doc Saunders (Cedric Hardwicke), whose patients include America's most wanted criminal, John Dillinger (portrayed by Leo Gordon). Acquiring a nickname, "Baby Face Nelson", a grateful Gillis joins up with Dillinger and quickly becomes the FBI's second most wanted man.

The ruthless Baby Face goes on a shooting spree, even killing innocent motorists just to steal a car. He doesn't like playing second fiddle to Dillinger, but after the arch-criminal is shot in Chicago, it becomes Baby Face's turn to be public enemy number one. He commits multiple murders, even killing Doc in a fit of anger, and frightens Sue by placing a rifle sight on children.

Trapped by a roadblock, Baby Face flees on foot and is shot several times. Stumbling to a graveyard, he pleads with Sue at first, then taunts her, to put him out of his misery, and she does.

== Cast ==
- Mickey Rooney as Lester M. 'Baby Face Nelson' Gillis
- Carolyn Jones as Sue Nelson
- Cedric Hardwicke as Doc Saunders
- Leo Gordon as John Dillinger
- Anthony Caruso as John Hamilton
- Jack Elam as Fatso Nagel
- John Hoyt as Samuel Parker
- Ted de Corsia as Rocca
- Elisha Cook, Jr. as Homer Van Meter
- Robert Osterloh as FBI Agent Johnson
- Thayer David as Connelly
- Dabbs Greer as FBI Agent Charles Bonner
- George E. Stone as Mr. Hall – Bank Manager
- Lisa Davis as Ann Saper – the Lady in Red
- Emile Meyer as Mac – Detective
- Dan Terranova as Miller
- Murray Alper as Alex – Bank Guard
- Harry Antrim as Pharmacist
- Tom Fadden as Postman Harkins
- Duke Mitchell as Solly – Pool Hall Attendant

== Production ==
“Don Seigel’s films are consistent in that, from film to film, there exists a deeply felt pessimism related to the futility of many of the protagonist’s actions. These people are frequently seen at a dead end in their emotional or professional lives and see little hope for change or a meaningful future.” —Biographer Judith M. Kass in Don Seigel: The Hollywood Professionals, Volume 4 (1975)

The Production Code had recently repealed a ban on dramatising the lives of real criminals. Producer Al Zimbalist formed ZS Productions with Irving Shulman to make a film based on the latter's unpublished novel about Baby Face Nelson. He originally announced he was seeking Montgomery Clift, Frank Sinatra or Tony Curtis for the lead.

Eventually they partnered with Mickey Rooney's Fryman Enterprises to make the movie. Don Siegel was hired to direct.

Zimbalist wanted to borrow Edd Byrnes from Warner Bros to play John Dillinger, but the studio refused to release him.

Filming started in October 1955. Zimbalist did some second unit filming in Chicago himself.

Shulman was later hired by Sam Katzman to do a script on Pretty Boy Floyd.

Rooney says he was offered a million dollars to buy out his interest in the film but he refused, confident it would be a success.

== Reception ==
When the film was released film critic Bosley Crowther panned the film writing, "Baby Face Nelson, heading the double bill on the Loew's circuit, is a thoroughly standard, pointless and even old-fashioned gangster picture, the kind that began going out along with the oldtime sedans. As a matter of fact, one of the few absorbing sights in this United Artists release, starring Mickey Rooney, is a continual procession of vintage jalopies, chugging in and out of the proceedings ... The other distinction, also mild, is Sir Cedric Hardwicke's professional portrait of a seedy, lecherous and alcoholic physician who consorts with criminals."

The Los Angeles Times called it a "bitter bloody drama".

The film was a financial success and kicked off a series of movies where Rooney played a tough guy, including The Last Mile and The Big Operator.

== Theme ==
Biographer Judith M. Kass locates Baby Face Nelson within a historical and social context in which Seigel’s protagonists are doomed:

Even if they so desired, these [characters] are incapable of altering their life styles, of modifying their aberrant personalities to conform to “normal” society. They end their lives as they perpetuated them…fixed in the outmoded violence of the 1930's: conduct that was to become as anachronistic as the cars they drove. Nelson, Dillinger, and their counterparts in the cinema of the Thirties are the dinosaurs of the era. Their behavior will soon give way to more organized crime, mechanized and dispassionate.

== See also ==
- List of American films of 1957

== Sources ==
- Kass, Judith M. (1975). Don Seigel: The Hollywood Professionals, Volume 4 (1975 ed.). New York: Tanvity Press. p. 207. ISBN 0-498-01665-X.
