= City Across the River =

1949 film by Maxwell Shane

- Theatrical release poster
- Directed by: Maxwell Shane
- Screenplay by: Maxwell Shane; Dennis J. Cooper
- Based on: The Amboy Dukes by Irving Shulman
- Produced by: Maxwell Shane
- Starring: Peter Fernandez; Stephen McNally; Thelma Ritter; Sue England; Luis Van Rooten; Jeff Corey
- Cinematography: Maury Gertsman
- Edited by: Ted J. Kent
- Music by: Walter Scharf
- Production company: Universal Pictures
- Distributed by: Universal Pictures
- Release dates: April 7, 1949 (New York City); July 4, 1949 (United States)
- Running time: 91 minutes
- Country: United States
- Language: English
- Budget: $1.5 million
- Box office: $1.5 million

City Across the River is a 1949 American film noir crime film directed by Maxwell Shane and starring Stephen McNally, with Sue England and Barbara Whiting in principal support. The screenplay is based on the novel The Amboy Dukes by Irving Shulman.

The film is the credited screen debut of Tony Curtis (billed onscreen as "Anthony Curtis").

== Plot ==
Two members of a tough Brooklyn street gang accidentally kill one of their teachers.

Frank Cusack is a leading member of the Amboy Dukes teenage gang based in a slum-ridden area of Brooklyn. His activities with the gang ultimately lead from vandalism and hooliganism to complicity in the murder of a school teacher. His hopes—and those of his parents—for an escape from the bleakness of slum life are dashed by circumstance and by his willingness to accept the gang code of not informing to the police.

== Cast ==
- Peter Fernandez as Frank Cusack
- Stephen McNally as Stan Albert
- Thelma Ritter as Mrs. Katie Cusack
- Luis Van Rooten as Joe Cusack
- Jeff Corey as Police Lieutenant Louie Macon
- Sharon McManus as Alice Cusack
- Sue England as Betty Maylor
- Barbara Whiting as Annie Kane
- Richard Benedict as Gaggsy Steens
- Al Ramsen as Benjamin 'Benny' Wilks
- Joshua Shelley as Theodore "Crazy" Perrin
- Tony Curtis as Mitch (as Anthony Curtis)
- Pepe Hern - as Pete
- Mickey Knox as Larry
- Richard Jaeckel as Bull
- Robert Osterloh as Mr. Bannon

== Reception ==
=== Box office ===
The film opened at the Capitol Theatre in New York City on April 7, 1949, and grossed $72,000 its first week.

=== Critical response ===
Thomas M. Pryor, film critic for the New York Times, gave the film a positive review: "Despite its limited view, City Across the River is nevertheless an honest and tempered reflection of life. It is rich in character delineation, especially in minor roles, and there is a coarse, natural tang to much of the writing by Director-Producer Maxwell Shane and his co-scenarist, Dennis Cooper. Most of the players are comparatively unfamiliar, with the exception of Stephen McNally, who plays the role of a community center director in the neighborhood, and this gives the film an added degree of realism."

Variety magazine praised the film: "Out of Irving Shulman’s grim novel, The Amboy Dukes, Maxwell Shane has whipped together a hardhitting and honest film on juvenile delinquency ... The plot threads are smoothly woven into the social fabric ... The performances by all members of the cast are marked by Shane's accent on naturalness."

In 2000 film critic Dennis Schwartz questioned the honesty of the screenplay: "This is a much softened version of Irving Schulman's The Amboy Dukes, a book about a rough gang of teenagers in the postwar [sic] period of Brooklyn ... This is a tired and clichéd film with its main selling point all the good location shots of the city. Tony Curtis made his film debut, taking a small part as one of the Amboy Dukes. All the gang members are stock characters and the predictable story sheds little insight about juvenile delinquency, offering only an outsider's look into the grimness of street life ... This film missed what teenage life was like in the city slums by a country mile and instead threw together a cliché-ridden story. The book was a popular hard-hitting novel. This film lost everything about the novel that was essential, and the robotic acting didn't help."
