= Watusi (film) =

1959 film by Kurt Neumann

- Original film poster
- Directed by: Kurt Neumann
- Written by: James Clavell
- Based on: King Solomon's Mines by H. Rider Haggard
- Produced by: Al Zimbalist; Donald Zimbalist
- Starring: George Montgomery; Taina Elg; David Farrar; Rex Ingram.
- Cinematography: Harold E. Wellman
- Edited by: William B. Gulick
- Color process: Technicolor
- Production company: Metro-Goldwyn-Mayer
- Distributed by: Metro-Goldwyn-Mayer
- Release date: July 1, 1959
- Running time: 85 minutes
- Country: United States
- Language: English
- Budget: $485,000
- Box office: $1,545,000

Watusi (also known as King Solomon's Mines 2) is a 1959 American adventure film, starring George Montgomery, Taina Elg, and David Farrar. Directed by Kurt Neumann, the film is a sequel to the 1950 film King Solomon's Mines. It was produced by Al Zimbalist and Donald Zimbalist. The screenplay was by James Clavell loosely based on the 1885 novel King Solomon's Mines by H. Rider Haggard.

== Plot ==
Harry Quatermain arrives in the British Protectorate of Tanganyika in 1919, shortly after the conclusion of World War I. He is the son of Allan Quatermain, Africa's most celebrated guide, who first set out to discover the source of King Solomon's wealth. There he meets Rick Cobb, a jungle guide and friend of his father. Harry is determined to succeed where his father failed.

Harry proposes a safari. Rick agrees to lead it.

On the trail, they meet Erica Neuler, a young German woman whose missionary father has been killed by natives. At first Harry has resentment towards Erica because his mother and sister were killed by a German U Boat. Harry had to identify their dead bodies.

Tensions mount when both men come to desire Erica. A Watusi chief allows them to explore the mines. After a dangerous journey through the mines they find the diamonds and return safely back at their camp. Harry realizes that he's found something among the Watusi better than wealth - peace and contentment - and decides to remain in the village. Erica reveals that she's in love with him chooses to stay. Rick goes home alone.

== Cast ==
- George Montgomery as Harry Quatermain
- Taina Elg as Erica Neuler
- David Farrar as Rick Cobb
- Rex Ingram as Umbopa
- Dan Seymour as Mohamet
- Robert Goodwin as Jim-Jim
- Anthony M. Davis as Amtaga
- Paul Thompson as Gagool
- Harold Dyrenforth as Wilhelm von Kentner
- Charles Swain as M'ban
- Martin Wilkins as Wounded Native

== Production ==
The film was originally known as Return to King Solomon's Mines and was the first movie produced for the studio by Al Zimbalist since he signed a contract with them. Director Kurt Neumann had just made The Fly (1958), which was written by James Clavell, Watusi's screenwriter. Taina Elg was under contract to MGM at the time and had just made Les Girls for them.

The film reuses some footage from a previous MGM adaptation of the novel, King Solomon's Mines (1950) starring Deborah Kerr and Stewart Granger.

During filming, Irma Neumann, wife of director Kurt, died. A few weeks after filming completed, the director himself also died.

== Reception ==
=== Box office ===
According to MGM records the film earned $695,000 in the US and Canada and $850,000 elsewhere resulting in a profit of $79,000.
