= One Million B.C. =

1940 film by D. W. Griffith, Hal Roach, Hal Roach, Jr.

- Theatrical release poster
- Directed by: Hal Roach; Hal Roach Jr.
- Written by: Mickell Novack; George Baker; Joseph Frickert
- Produced by: Hal Roach; D. W. Griffith
- Starring: Victor Mature; Carole Landis; Lon Chaney Jr.
- Narrated by: Conrad Nagel
- Cinematography: Norbert Brodine
- Edited by: Ray Snyder
- Music by: Werner R. Heymann
- Production company: Hal Roach Studios
- Distributed by: United Artists
- Release date: April 5, 1940
- Running time: 80 minutes
- Country: United States
- Language: English
- Box office: $462,730

One Million B.C. is a 1940 American fantasy film produced by Hal Roach Studios and released by United Artists. It is also known by the titles Cave Man, Man and His Mate, and Tumak.

The film stars Victor Mature as protagonist Tumak, a young caveman who strives to unite the uncivilized Rock Tribe and the peaceful Shell Tribe, Carole Landis as Loana, daughter of the Shell Tribe chief and Tumak's love interest, and Lon Chaney Jr. as Tumak's stern father and leader of the Rock Tribe. Chaney's billing differs from that of his home studio Universal Pictures in that Hal Roach elected to retain the "Jr." instead of billing him under his father's name, possibly because Roach was co-directing the film with his own son Hal Roach Jr.

One Million B.C. was a popular success and was nominated for two Academy Awards for its special effects and musical score, although the film is controversial for its use of live animals dueling.

== Plot ==
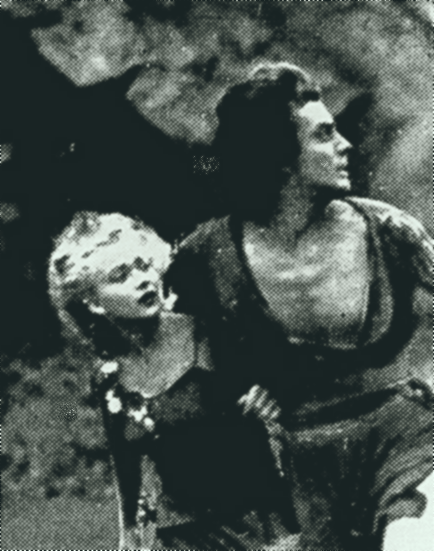
Victor Mature and Carol Landis

Carol Landis

A group of modern-day hikers caught in a storm seek shelter in a cave. They encounter an anthropologist who interprets prehistoric cave carvings that introduce the story of a young stone age man.

Akhoba, head of the Rock Tribe, leads a hunting party. His son Tumak begs the right to his first kill, a small Triceratops which he wrestles to death. An elderly man in the party falls from a cliff and is left to die. The party arrives at the Rock Tribe's cave with their prey. The beast is cooked on an open fire. When it is done, the strongest feed first, next the women and children, then the few elderly pick through the scraps. Tumak defends his portion from demands by Akhoba. They fight and Akhoba knocks Tumak over a cliff as his mother watches. Tumak recovers to find a mammoth attacking him. He runs and climbs a tree. The mammoth rams the tree and knocks it into a river.

Tumak floats downstream unconscious and is found by Loana of the Shell Tribe. Her tribesmen answer her shell horn call and take Tumak to their cave. The tribe gathers for a meal of vegetables, shared orderly with the children, women, and elderly served first. Tumak awakes and Loana gives him food, which he guards as he eats, perplexing the tribe who share and do not fight. Tumak looks on, confused by the customs of the Shell Tribe.

Meanwhile, Akhoba leads a Rock Tribe hunting party into the hills, but is injured trying to kill a muskox. As Akhoba lies injured, a younger hunter asserts authority over the party and takes Akhoba's place as leader, leaving him to die. Later, Akhoba, crippled, shows up at the Rock Tribe cave but is treated with contempt.

Meanwhile, Tumak adjusts slowly to life with the Shell Tribe. He helps the children gather food by shaking fruit out of a tree, and they teach him how to laugh. He tries to fish with Loana but grows frustrated, as spearfishing is not like land hunting. While he is fishing, an Allosaurus traps a child in a tree. Tumak uses a borrowed spear to kill the dinosaur and save the child, but does not want to return the spear to its owner. Later that night, Tumak steals the spear and a hammer from their maker, and attacks him when he tries to reclaim them. The tribal leader, Loana's father, banishes Tumak.

As Tumak departs, Loana, who has fallen in love with him, leaves her tribe to follow him, much to his dismay. Tumak pulls apples from a tree for himself, ignoring Loana. Seeing that she has trouble reaching apples herself, he relents and helps her. Along the way, they spot a giant horned armadillo, which chases them up a tree. Later, as Tumak and Loana reach Rock Tribe territory, they are trapped in a fissure during a fight between a sail-backed dinosaur and a lizard-like dinosaur. Loana escapes, but is menaced by the leader who previously displaced Akhoba. She blows her shell horn, leading Tumak to her rescue. He saves her by defeating the leader, becoming the new leader.

Tumak has Loana handle the meals, which confuses the Rock Tribe, since she feeds the women and children first, then Akhoba whom she has sat on his former throne, and then the other elders. Lastly, Tumak and the able-bodied men are fed. The next day, Akhoba comes outside to see his tribe learning to gather fruits and vegetables, with Loana showing them which are good to eat and which are not. Loana and Tumak sit and talk, but Tumak is called away to help hunt a deer, while Loana helps a Rock woman, Nupondi, to search for her missing child Wandi.

A nearby volcano erupts, scattering the Rock Tribe after destroying their cave. Nupondi is engulfed by a lava flow. Loana saves Wandi, but is cut off from the others. She and Wandi head to the Shell Tribe. Many animals fall into the crevasses opened by the volcanic eruption. Tumak searches for Loana but finds only a scrap of her clothing near the lava flow, and presumes her to be dead.

Later, a Shell tribesman seeks out Tumak and tells him that Loana is still alive, but the Shell Tribe is trapped in their cave by an iguana-like dinosaur. Tumak leads his men to attack the beast. Akohba and the women with the children follow. The Shell Tribe hold off the creature with torches. Tumak's direct spear attack is futile. Akhoba then advises Tumak to distract the dinosaur while the rest of the men climb to higher ground. They start a rockslide that kills the beast. The formerly despised Akhoba becomes recognized for his experience and wisdom. As a result, both tribes unite as one. Tumak, Loana, and Wandi are framed in the last scene as the dawn of a new day begins.

== Cast ==
- Victor Mature as Tumak
- Carole Landis as Loana
- Lon Chaney Jr. as Akhoba
- Conrad Nagel as narrator in cave
- John Hubbard as Ohtao
- Nigel De Brulier as Peytow
- Mamo Clark as Nupondi
- Inez Palange as Tohana
- Edgar Edwards as Skakana
- Jacqueline Dalya as Soaka
- Mary Gale Fisher as Wandi
- Norman Budd as Rock tribe member
- Harry Wilson as Rock tribe member
- John Northpole as Rock tribe member
- Lorraine Rivero as Rock tribe member
- Harold Howard as Rock tribe member
- Robert Kent as mountain guide
- Paul Stader as Allosaurus

== Production ==
=== Script ===
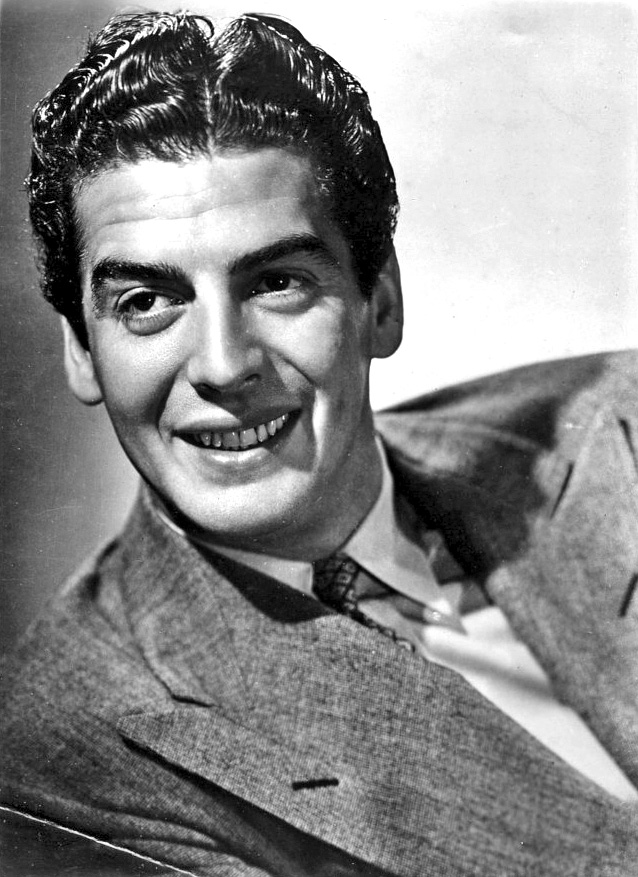
Victor Mature as Tumak

Producer Hal Roach hired D. W. Griffith to direct One Million B.C. and Of Mice and Men, writing to him, "I need help from the production side to select the proper writers, cast, etc. and to help me generally in the supervision of these pictures." Griffith reportedly wrote a script based on a French novel by Eugene Roche.

=== Direction ===
Griffith eventually disagreed with Roach over the film production and left the project. Roach later insisted that Griffith did direct some scenes in the completed film. This would make the film the final production in which Griffith was actively involved. However, cast members recall Griffith directing only the screen tests and costume tests. When Roach advertised One Million B.C. in late 1939 with Griffith listed as producer, Griffith asked the studio to remove his name.

=== Actors ===
Victor Mature had just made his film debut in Roach's The Housekeeper's Daughter. Roach had signed him to a seven-year contract."Griffith did all the tests", recalled Mature. "He tested for six months. I don't know what he was looking for. They'd have been better off letting the old man direct the picture. One day, he just wasn't around any more."Lon Chaney Jr. had just made Of Mice and Men for Roach. "I had to 'ugh' my way through that picture", said Mature.One Million B.C. was nominated for two Academy Awards: Best Musical Score (Werner R. Heymann) and Best Special Effects (Roy Seawright and Elmer Raguse).

=== Animals ===
The "dinosaurs" and "prehistoric mammals" seen in One Million B.C include a pig in a rubber Triceratops suit, a man in an Allosaurus suit, Asian elephants with fake tusks and fur made to look like mastodonts, two dogs, brahman cattle with fake horns and fur made to look like muskoxen, a sun bear cub, a six-banded armadillo with horns glued on, a young alligator with a Dimetrodon-like sail glued on its back, a rhinoceros iguana, a snake, a coati, a monitor lizard, an anole, and an Argentine black and white tegu.

One Million B.C features several scenes of animal cruelty. This included a scene in which the alligator fought the tegu left that animal seriously injured. The Society for the Prevention of Cruelty to Animals (SPCA) later banned ban many of the abuses that occurred during its production.

== Reception ==
One Million B.C. drew mixed reviews from critics.

- B. R. Crisler of The New York Times called the film "a masterpiece of imaginative fiction...You are almost certain to like something about 'One Million, B. C.'"
- Variety called it "corny", adding, "There isn't much sense to the action nor much interest in the characters."
- Harrison's Reports praised the "good technical work" and called the volcanic eruption "most thrilling", but said the storyline and romance were "slightly silly, and only tend to bore one."
- Film Daily called the film a "decided novelty" that was "full of thrills" and had "excellent" direction.
- John Mosher of The New Yorker wrote, "Being skimpy with its dinosaurs, 'One Million B.C.' won't tickle the gizzards of paleontologists."

== Legacy ==
=== Special effects footage ===
Special effects footage from One Million B.C., as well as unused scenes and outtakes, went into a stock footage library. This footage was then used by numerous companies through the years by producers who wanted to save money on costly special effects shots in films with dinosaurs. Some westerns used footage of rockslides and volcanoes from One Million B.C.. Footage appeared in the following films:

- Tarzan's Desert Mystery (1943)
- A chapter of the serial film Superman (1948)
- Atom Man vs. Superman (1950)
- Two Lost Worlds (1950)
- The Lost Volcano (1950
- A film in the Bomba, the Jungle Boy series
- The American version of Godzilla Raids Again (1955), known as Gigantis the Fire Monster (1959)
- Jungle Manhunt (1951)
- A film in the Jungle Jim series
- Smoky Canyon (1952)
- The "Yesterday's World" episode of The Schaefer Century Theatre (1952)
- Untamed Women (1952)
- Robot Monster (1953)
- The Lost Planet (1953)
- King Dinosaur (1955)
- The Three Stooges short film Space Ship Sappy (1957)
- Teenage Caveman (1958)
- She Demons (1958)
- Valley of the Dragons (1961)
- Journey to the Center of Time (1967)
- Horror of the Blood Monsters (1970; the stock footage was tinted in color for this film)
- Island of the Dinosaurs (La isla de los dinosaurios 1967)
- Adventure at the Center of the Earth (Aventura al centro de la tierra; 1966)
- The Ghost Jesters (Los fantasmas burlones; 1964)
- One Million AC/DC (1969)
- TerrorVision (1986)
- Attack of the B Movie Monster (1989)

=== Remake ===
One Million B.C was remade as One Million Years B.C. (1966) starring John Richardson as Tumak and Raquel Welch as Loana. The external scenes were filmed in the Canary Islands. The remake itself had footage lifted from it (a cavemen getting crushed by falling rocks) for Stanley Kubrick’s 1971 film A Clockwork Orange. The film was later colorized for the modern market.

== See also ==
- List of films featuring dinosaurs
