= Hamilton Invaders =

1960s toy line

Hamilton's Invaders
- Company: Remco
- Availability: 1964–1964
- Materials: Plastic

The Hamilton's Invaders was a 1964 series of plastic toys of giant insect type monsters, toy soldiers and vehicles. The toyline was conceived and marketed by Remco on television during the early 1960s, inspired by the giant insect (see List of natural horror films) genre that were popular from the 1950s, that were in reruns on TV.

A child could propel the giant insect toys via pull-string motors towards blue soldiers while counter-attacking with heavy motorized artillery and helicopters. Remco also produced a bug-eyed helmet and grenade pistol which the child could wear for total immersion in the play-acting scenario. It is not known how the name "Hamilton" was decided upon.

Parts to these playsets are rare, as the toyline was ended after a selling for a single season (the copyright on the toy packaging is 1964). It is believed that though popular with children, their mothers did not enjoy having moving giant insects in their home.

== Items and playsets available ==
- Hamilton Helmet with Non-Shattering Goggles (silver and black variations)
- Chrome Grenade Pistol with yellow grenades – this pistol was also used in a green variation (with red grenades) for the Remco Monkey Division and Land of the Giants toylines
- Pistol – silver and yellow light-projecting pistol, also used in variations for other toylines
- 12 True Blue Defenders. They were a United Nations type light blue plastic 70 mm toy soldiers dressed in late World War II early Korean War U.S. Army uniform. They came in 6 poses of a Master Sergeant firing a pistol, a buck sergeant with M-1928A1 Thompson sub machine gun throwing a pineapple hand grenade, one firing a M-1928A1 Thompson, one firing an M-1 rifle, one charging with an M-1 with fixed bayonet, and one kneeling firing a bazooka. The Blue Defenders in this set do not have a slit perforation on the base like the other figures provided with the vehicles have.
- Hornet Helicopter and 3 Blue Defenders
- Mosquito Jeep and 3 Blue Defenders
- Torpedo Tank and 3 Blue Defenders
- Spring Motor Beetle and 3 Blue Defenders
- Horrible Hamilton with Spring Motor
- Horrible Hamilton / Torpedo Tank and Blue Defenders
- The Battle of Horrible Hamilton – Horrible Hamilton, Hornet Helicopter and Blue Defenders
- The Battle of the Spider – Spider, Mosquito Jeep and Blue Defenders
- Battle of the Monsters Sears Exclusive – (includes both playsets above)

== The Bugs ==
- Horrible Hamilton – large green bug featured leg articulation. Came with three additional smaller plastic molded bugs, one each in red, blue and green(?), at least in some sets.
- Yellow Spider – black and yellow spider with red spines
- Yellow Beetle – black and yellow with red bumps

Advertised names for the spider and beetle were "Spooky Spider" and "Gruesome Beetle" or "Brutal Beetle". The colors were not consistent. Horrible Hamilton usually was made in green, but some yellow versions were made. Some of the spiders and beetles were issued in a green base color plastic. The spider and beetle were reissued by Remco with the large "Voyage to the Bottom of the Sea" playsets in the late 1960s.
