= Irving Shulman =

American novelist

- Born: May 21, 1913; Brooklyn, New York City, New York, U.S.
- Died: March 23, 1995 (aged 81); Sherman Oaks, Los Angeles, California, U.S.
- Occupations: Writer screenwriter

Irving Shulman (May 21, 1913 – March 23, 1995) was an American author and screenwriter whose works were adapted into movies. His books included The Amboy Dukes, Cry Tough, The Square Trap, and Platinum High School, all of which were adapted into movies.

Shulman wrote the early film treatment for Rebel Without a Cause. Stewart Stern did the screenplay based on the story concepts of Shulman and director Nicholas Ray. Later, Shulman used his treatment as the basis for his 1956 novel Children of the Dark.

After graduating Phi Beta Kappa from the University of Iowa and earning a master's degree from Columbia University, he served in the Army during World War II. He subsequently spent most of the war in Washington, D.C., working for the War Department's troop education program, where he wrote for Army Talk.

Published in 1947, The Amboy Dukes examined the grim, and sometimes short, lives of teenage street criminals in Brooklyn during World War II; notably, its primary characters were described as being Jewish. It sold five million copies and led to his being hired as a screenwriter by Warner Bros. Two subsequent novels, Cry Tough! and The Big Brokers, followed the equally grim experiences of some of the characters who survived The Amboy Dukes, but with somewhat less emphasis on their being practitioners of Judaism.

In The Amboy Dukes, two members of the gang accidentally shoot and kill one of their teachers; a third member of the Dukes kills one of them before the story is over. Cry Tough! has another member of the Dukes, Mitchell Wolf, return from prison and, after trying unsuccessfully to "go straight," become a member of an organized crime family. In The Big Brokers, Wolf and two other former members of the Dukes are sent to Nevada to run one of the crime family's casinos in Las Vegas.

In The Devil's Knee, former Amboy Dukes Larry and Bull (now called by his proper name, Simon) and Joyce take up residence in Beverly Hills, where they deal with Joyce's spectacularly wayward daughter Verney.

Shulman's message in the first three books is that crime does not pay. The message in the fourth installment seems to be that crime can also be entertainment.

In 1949, a film based on The Amboy Dukes, titled City Across The River, was released; Tony Curtis made his second on-screen appearance in this film, which is believed to have provided at least a partial model for Elvis Presley's early image. In 1959 the movie Cry Tough based on Shulman's novel was released. However, in the transition from print to film the Jewish Brooklyn gang of the novel became a Puerto Rican gang in Spanish Harlem.

In the 1960s, Shulman wrote biographies of Jean Harlow and Rudolph Valentino, and a novelization of the film West Side Story.

Shulman died of Alzheimer's disease in 1995.

== Selected Bibliography ==
- The Amboy Dukes (1947)
- Cry Tough (1949)
- The Big Brokers (1951)
- The Square Trap (1953)
- Good Deeds Must Be Punished (1956)
- Children of the Dark (1956)
- The Velvet Knife (1959)
- Platinum High School (1960)
- West Side Story (novelization) (1961)
- The Roots of Fury (1961)
- The Notorious Landlady (1962 film) [novelization]
- Harlow: An Intimate Biography(1964)
- Valentino (1967)
- The Devil's Knee (1973)
