= Cat-Women of the Moon =

1953 film by Arthur Hilton

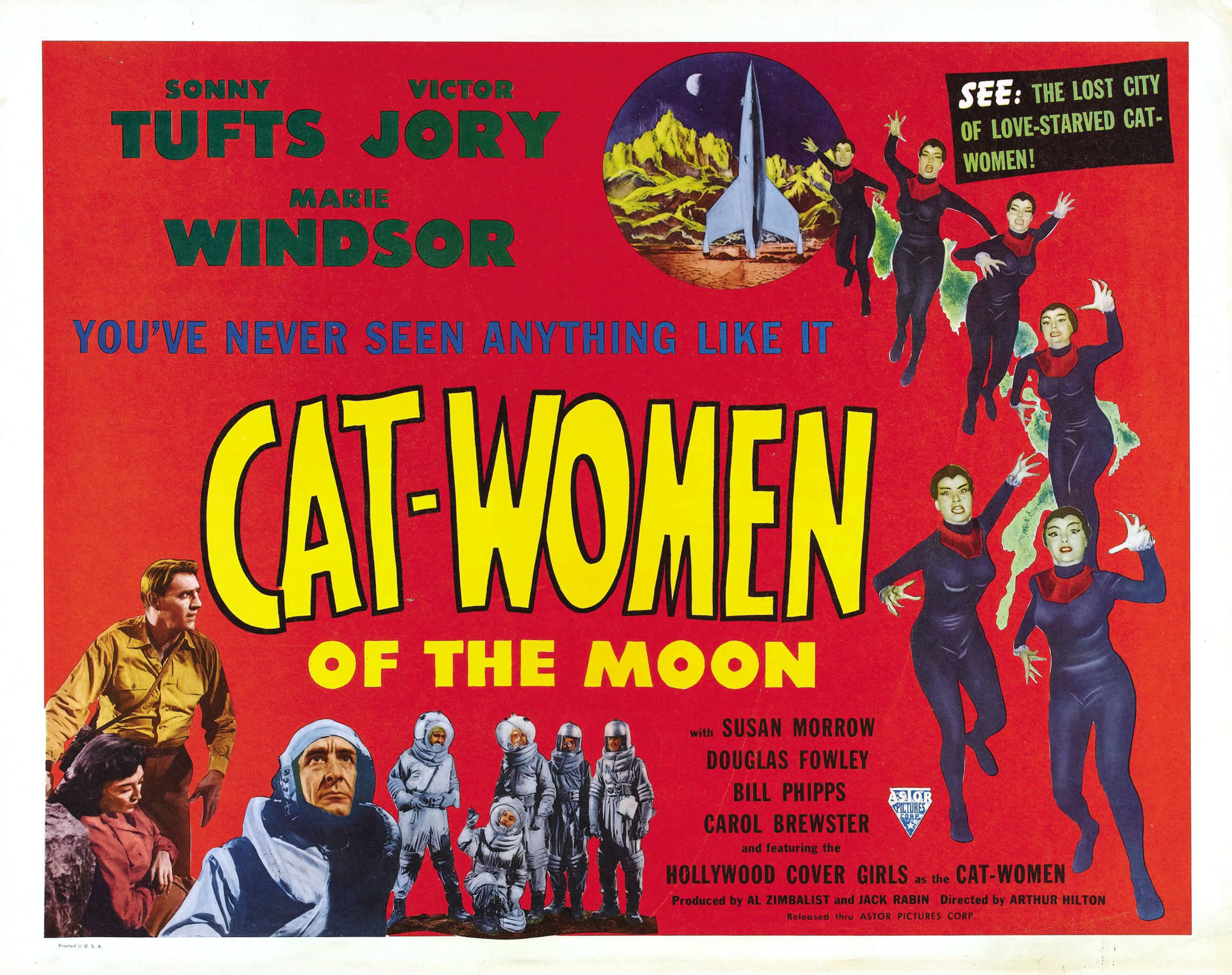
- Theatrical release half-sheet display poster
- Directed by: Arthur Hilton
- Written by: Roy Hamilton
- Produced by: Jack Rabin; Al Zimbalist
- Starring: Sonny Tufts; Victor Jory; Marie Windsor
- Cinematography: William P. Whitley
- Edited by: John A. Bushelman
- Music by: Elmer Bernstein
- Distributed by: Astor Pictures
- Release date: September 3, 1953
- Running time: 64 minutes
- Country: United States
- Language: English

Cat-Women of the Moon is a 1953 American Independent black-and-white three-dimensional science-fiction film, produced by Jack Rabin and Al Zimbalist, directed by Arthur Hilton, that stars Sonny Tufts, Victor Jory, and Marie Windsor. The film was released on September 3, 1953 in Los Angeles by Astor Pictures.

The musical score was composed by Academy Award–winner Elmer Bernstein, whose name is misspelled as "Bernstien" in the opening credits. The spider puppet effects were handled by Wah Chang, and Harry Thomas handled Make-up. Some moonscapes were done from Chesley Bonestell paintings. Special effects were by Jack Rabin and Al Zimbalist, and William Glasgow was Art Director.

Cat-Women of the Moon was remade in 1958 as Missile to the Moon by producer Richard Cunha.

== Plot ==
Travelling in a spaceship equipped with wooden tables and chairs, a scientific expedition to the Moon encounters a race of cat-women, the last survivors of a two-million-year-old lunar civilization. Residing deep within a Moon cavern, the cat-women have managed to maintain not only the remnants of a breathable atmosphere and Earth-like gravity, but also a pair of gigantic Moon-spiders. The cat-women wear black unitards, have beehive hairstyles, and wear elaborate cosmetics. Realizing that their remaining atmosphere will soon be exhausted, the cat-women plan to steal the expedition's spaceship and return to Earth, where, in the words of the cat-women's leader, Alpha, "We will get their women under our power, and soon we will rule the whole world!"

Through the use of their telepathic abilities, the cat-women have been subliminally controlling Helen Salinger, the mission navigator and only female member of the Earth expedition. Once on the Moon, the cat-women take control of Helen's mind, after which she leads the entire crew (clad in spacesuits and equipped with matches, cigarettes, and a gun) to the cat-women's cavern. Although unable to directly control male minds, the cat-women are able to influence the male crew through Helen, using their own superior intellectual abilities and feminine wiles. As explained to Helen by the cat-woman Beta, "Show us their weak points. We'll take care of the rest."

Along with telepathy, the cat-women can transport themselves, unseen and instantly, from place-to-place within the cavern. They use this ability to steal the crew's unguarded spacesuits, which forces the crew deeper into the cavern and into violent confrontations with the two Moon-spiders and the cat-women. Failing to exterminate the men, the cat-women approach them openly, using Helen to help establish friendly relations. Kip, who has been suspicious of the cat-women, confronts Alpha about the missing spacesuits; she promises to return the suits in the morning. Food and drink are then brought, and private conversations between both groups begin. As these progress ("You're too smart for me, baby. I like 'em stupid"), the gun-wielding Kip sits alone, unable to intervene, while the cat-women successfully manipulate the weak points of expedition commander Laird and the other men.

By that evening, the cat-women have learned how to pilot the spaceship. Following a modern dance performance by the cat-women, Walt is stabbed to death by Beta. Lambda has fallen in love with crew member Doug and tells him of the cat-woman plot, saying, "I love you Doug, and I must kill you". The male crew now realizes they are in danger. Carrying three spacesuits, Alpha, Beta, and Helen run toward the spaceship. Lambda teleports ahead to delay them and is bludgeoned to death by Beta. Kip catches up and fires several shots, killing Alpha and Beta but leaving Helen uninjured. The surviving expedition members escape the cavern, reach the spaceship, and return to Earth.

== Cast ==
- Sonny Tufts as Laird Grainger
- Victor Jory as Kip Reissner
- Marie Windsor as Helen Salinger
- Susan Morrow as Lambda
- Douglas Fowley as Walt Walters
- Bill Phipps as Doug Smith
- Carol Brewster as Alpha
- Betty Arlen as Cat-Woman
- Suzanne Alexander as Beta (credited as Suzann Alexander)
- Roxann Delman as Cat-Woman
- Ellye Marshall as Cat-Woman
- Judy Walsh as Cat-Woman

== Reception and legacy ==
Upon the film's release, Variety magazine wrote: "This imaginatively conceived and produced science-fiction yarn [an original story by producers Zimbalist and Rabin] takes the earth-to-moon premise and embellishes it with a civilization of cat-women on the moon ... Cast ably portray their respective roles ... Arthur Hilton makes his direction count in catching the spirit of the theme, and art direction is far above average for a film of this calibre. William Whitley's 3-D photography provides the proper eerie quality".

The New York Times wrote: "They (the Cat-women) try to get their hands on the visitors' rocket ship, hoping to come down here and hypnotize us all. Considering the delegation that went up, it's hard to imagine why".

The Monthly Film Bulletin wrote: "Juvenile space film in which the moon is found to be inhabited by the Hollywood Cover Girls, thinly disguised as cat-women and answering engagingly to the names of Alpha, Zeta and Lambda. Treatment and playing, though, are wholly lacking in verve."

The Encyclopedia of Science Fiction calls the film absurd, but notes that it "qualifies as one of the most influential science-fiction films ever made" as it influenced later low budget films "in which astronauts discover decadent, all-female (or almost all-female) civilizations on other planets, including Fire Maidens from Outer Space (1956), Missile to the Moon (1958), Queen of Outer Space (1958), Nude on the Moon (1961), Journey to the Seventh Planet (1962) [and] Voyage to the Planet of Prehistoric Women (1968)." The genre first appeared in Abbott and Costello Go to Mars, also released in 1953.

Cat-Women of the Moon inspired several songs on Shakespears Sister's 1992 album Hormonally Yours, among them their UK number-one hit "Stay". It was also spoofed by RiffTrax with Mary Jo Pehl and Bridget Nelson on April 15, 2016.

== Home media ==
In 1991 Rhino Home Video released a 3D version of the film on VHS converted to anaglyph format, for use with red and blue 3D glasses.

During the following decade it was also released on VHS and DVD in field sequential format, which uses LCD shutter glasses with a CRT tube television.

In 2020 and again in 2022 as part of a three volume collection, the same standard definition 3D version of the film was released for the first time on Blu-ray 3D as part of the collection Vintage 3D: Volume One.

On September 23, 2023 a 70th Anniversary Blu-ray 3D edition was released by VarietyFilms.net which used the same copy but upscaled the resolution using AI and made extensive alignment corrections. A better quality, longer cut of the film was also available on the disc in 2D.

== See also ==
- List of films featuring extraterrestrials

== Bibliography ==
- Warren, Bill. Keep Watching the Skies: American Science Fiction Films of the Fifties, 21st Century Edition (2nd edition. 1024 pages. Jefferson, North Carolina: McFarland & Company, 2009 (original 1st edition 1982). ISBN 0-89950-032-3.
