= Mamie Van Doren performances =

Mamie Van Doren has been in 41 films, including four RKO films

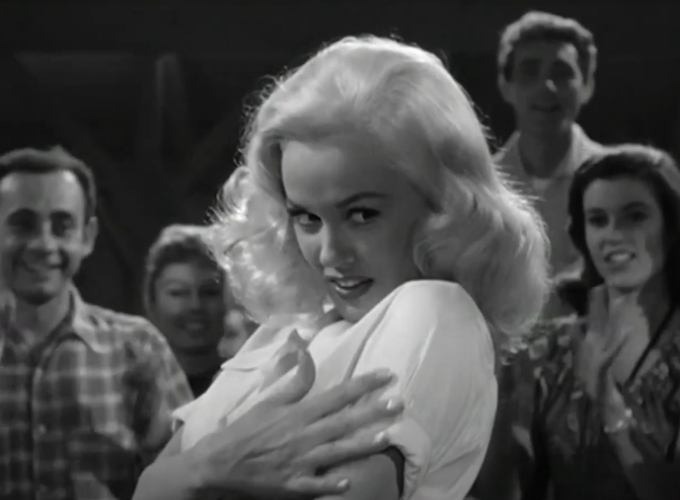
Van Doren in Untamed Youth (1957)

American actress Mamie Van Doren (born February 6, 1931) has been in 41 films from 1951 to 2012. Van Doren was discovered by Howard Hughes as Miss Eight Ball, and Hughes put Van Doren in 4 RKO movies, including Jet Pilot, His Kind of Woman, and Two Tickets to Broadway. These movies would have Van Doren playing minor roles, where she was often uncredited or credited as Joan Olander.

In 1953, Van Doren signed to Universal, with Universal having hopes of Van Doren becoming their version of Marilyn Monroe. Her first major film role, The All American, helped to shape her distinctive role in the 1950s as a "bad girl". Van Doren rose to fame, starring in rebellious-teen films, exploitation films, teen dramas, and musicals. These films, such as Untamed Youth, Running Wild, Teacher's Pet and High School Confidential, made her different from Monroe's roles as a "dumb blonde". These films, which would sometimes be risque, would challenge the Hays Code.

In the 1960s, Van Doren starred in several independent B-movies due to her contract with Universal not being renewed in 1960. Her last film with Universal was the 1960 film The Private Lives of Adam and Eve. In 1964, she starred in 3 Nuts in Search of a Bolt, a film directed by Tommy Noonan and inspired by the success of Promises! Promises! (1963), which Van Doren had turned down.

== Filmography ==
Year	Film title	Role	Studio	Notes	Ref.
1951	Footlight Varieties	Blonde in theater	RKO Radio Pictures	Credited as Joan Olander	
1951	His Kind of Woman	Lodge guest at bar	RKO Radio Pictures		
1951	Two Tickets to Broadway	Showgirl	RKO Radio Pictures		
1953	Forbidden	Singer	Universal Pictures	Uncredited	
1953	The All American	Susie Ward	Universal Pictures	First major film role	
1954	Hawaiian Nights	Glamour girl	Universal Pictures	Uncredited Short film	
1954	Yankee Pasha	Lilith, Harem slave	Universal Pictures		
1954	Francis Joins the WACS	Cpl. Bunky Hilstrom	Universal Pictures		
1955	Ain't Misbehavin'	Jackie	Universal Pictures		
1955	The Second Greatest Sex	Birdie Snyder	Universal Pictures		
1955	Running Wild	Irma Bean	Universal Pictures		
1956	Star in the Dust	Ellen Ballard	Universal Pictures	Last film under contract with Universal. Van Doren stopped accepting roles from the studio, because they were not giving her the breakthrough roles she so desperately craved.	
1957	Untamed Youth	Penny Lowe	Warner Brothers	In this film, Van Doren became the first actress to sing rock 'n roll in an American musical film.	
1957	The Girl in Black Stockings	Harriet Ames	United Artists	Van Doren's final film to be lined-up for her by Universal in 1956. a.k.a.: Wanton Murder and Wanton Murder Mystery	
1957	Jet Pilot	WAF	RKO Radio Pictures	Uncredited. Filmed from 1949 to 1953, but not released until 1959	
1958	Teacher's Pet	Peggy DeFore	Paramount Pictures	Van Doren's role was originally bigger, but was edited to be smaller because of the outfits she was required to wear in the film.	
1958	High School Confidential	Gwen Dulaine	Metro-Goldwyn-Mayer		
1958	Born Reckless	Jackie Adams	Warner Brothers		
1959	Guns, Girls, and Gangsters	Vi Victor	United Artists		
1959	The Beat Generation	Georgia Altera	Metro-Goldwyn-Mayer		
1959	The Beautiful Legs of Sabrina	Sabrina		Her first non-Hollywood motion picture release	
1959	The Big Operator	Mary Gibson	Metro-Goldwyn-Mayer		
1959	Girls Town	Silver Morgan	Metro-Goldwyn-Mayer	The first film to feature Van Doren nude. She appears nude through a fuzzy shower door.	
1960	Vice Raid	Carol Hudson	United Artists		
1960	College Confidential	Sally Blake	Universal Pictures		
1960	Sex Kittens Go to College	Dr. Mathilda West	Allied Artists		
1960	The Private Lives of Adam and Eve	Evie Simms/Eve	Universal Pictures	In this film, Van Doren wore only leaves for dream sequences.	
1961	The Blonde from Buenos Aires				
1964	The Candidate	Samantha Ashley			
1964	Freddy in the Wild West	Olivia	-	a.k.a.: The Sheriff Was a Lady (alternative title)	
1964	3 Nuts in Search of a Bolt	Saxie Symbol	Harlequin International Pictures	Filmed as a sequel/spinoff of Promises! Promises!, a film that Van Doren had turned down.	
1966	The Las Vegas Hillbillys	Boots Malone	Woolner Brothers	Co-starred Jayne Mansfield. This is the only time that any of the "Three M's" appeared together in a motion picture.	
1966	The Navy vs. the Night Monsters	Nora Hall	Realart Pictures Inc.	The first of two science fiction films that Van Doren made.	
1967	You've Got to Be Smart	Miss Hathaway			
1968	Voyage to the Planet of Prehistoric Women	Moana	American-International Television	The last science fiction film of Van Doren's career.	
1970	The Arizona Kid	Sharon Miller			
1975	That Girl from Boston	Princess Tassel			
1986	Free Ride	Debbie Stockwell	Galaxy International Releasing		
1999	The Vegas Connection	Rita			
2012	The American Tetralogy	Mazu or the Goddess of the Sea			
2026	Mamie Exposed! The Life and Loves of the Last Blonde Bombshell	Herself		Documentary	
