= Born Reckless =

Born Reckless may refer to:

- Born Reckless (1930 film), a 1930 American crime comedy film
- Born Reckless (1937 film), a 1937 American crime drama film
- Born Reckless (1958 film), a 1958 American Western drama film
