= Mamie Van Doren =

American actress (born 1931)

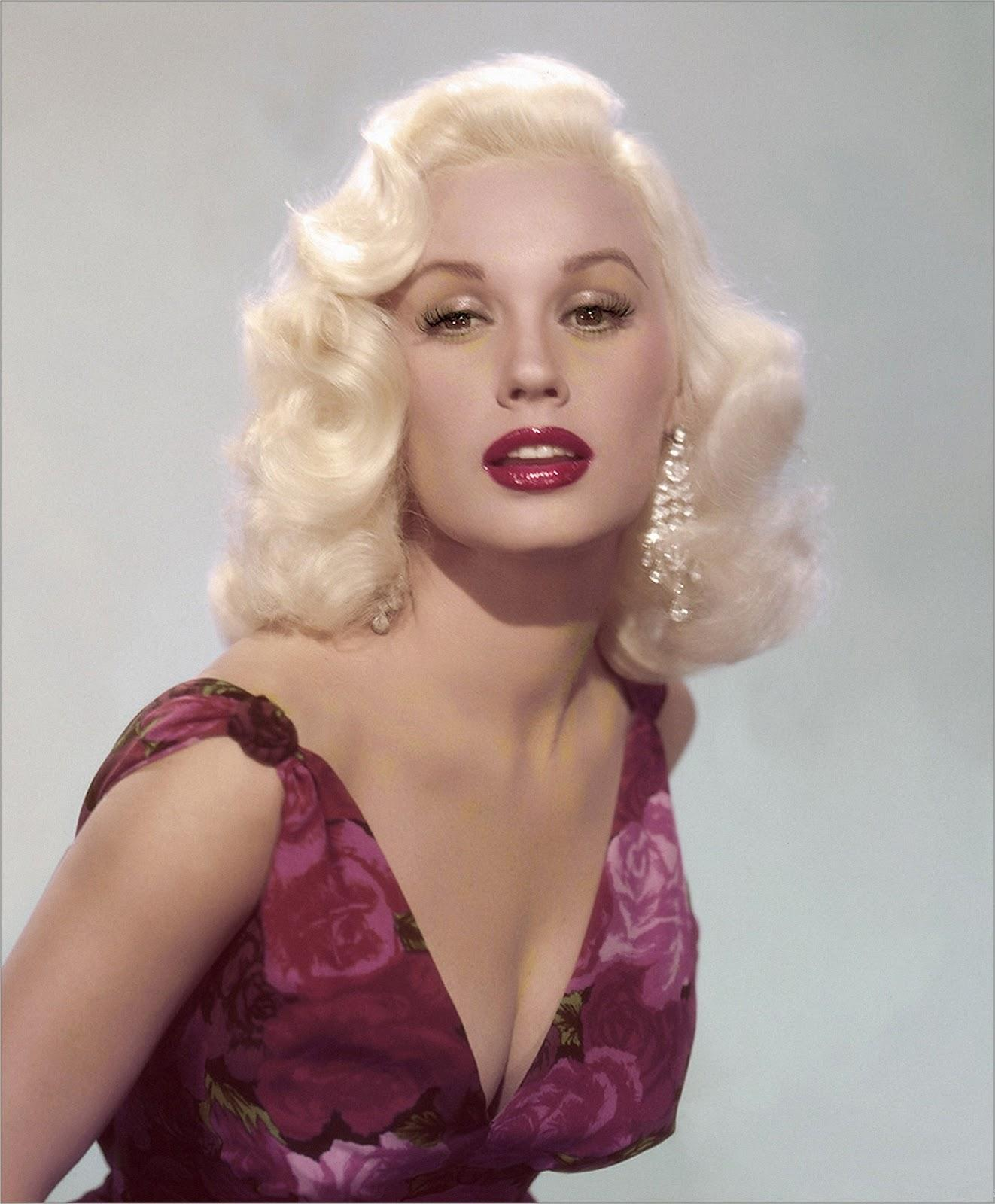
- Van Doren in 1957
- Born: Joan Lucille Olander; February 6, 1931 (age 95); Rowena, South Dakota, U.S.
- Occupations: Actress; singer; nightclub performer
- Years active: 1951–present
- Works: List of performances
- Spouses: Jack Newman (m. 1950; div. 1950); Ray Anthony (m. 1955; div. 1961); Lee Meyers (m. 1966; div. 1967); Ross McClintock (m. 1972; ann. 1973); Thomas Dixon (m. 1979)
- Children: 1
- Mamie Van Doren's Voice On working with Tommy Noonan for the film Three Nuts in Search of a Bolt (1964). Recorded 2005

Mamie Van Doren (/ˈmeɪmi væn ˈdɔːrən/; born Joan Lucille Olander; February 6, 1931) is an American former actress and model. The last living blonde bombshell from the Golden Age of Hollywood, she is one of the "Three M's", a group formed by Marilyn Monroe and Jayne Mansfield, who were contemporaries. In 1953, Van Doren, then named Joan Lucille Olander, signed a seven-year contract with Universal, which hoped that she would be their version of Monroe. She starred in teen dramas, exploitation, musical, comedy, and rock and roll films, among other genres, many of which have gone on to become cult classics. She was one of the leading sex symbols in the 1950s.

Van Doren was born and raised in Rowena, South Dakota, but her parents moved to Sioux City, Iowa, and eventually to Los Angeles in 1942 before she married Jack Newman. In 1949, at the age of eighteen, she won Miss Palm Springs and Miss Eight Ball. As Miss Eight Ball, she was discovered by film producer Howard Hughes, who put her in the RKO films His Kind of Woman (1951), Two Tickets to Broadway (1951), and Jet Pilot (1957) in minor roles. In 1950 she was dating the heavyweight boxer Jack Dempsey, over thirty-five years her senior, in New York City and was engaged to him. However, she left him to go back to Los Angeles. On January 20, 1953, Van Doren signed a contract with Universal, who wanted her to be Universal's equivalent of Monroe. While at Universal, Van Doren changed her name to Mamie Van Doren, the "Mamie" from then–First Lady Mamie Eisenhower and the "Van Doren" from Universal's telling Van Doren she was more Dutch than Swedish.

During her time at Universal, Van Doren starred in movies such as The Second Greatest Sex (1955), Running Wild (1955), and The All American (1953). Outside of Universal she starred in Untamed Youth (1957), Teacher's Pet (1958), High School Confidential (1958), Born Reckless (1958), The Beat Generation (1959), and Sex Kittens Go To College (1960). She starred on television shows such as What's My Line?, The Jack Benny Program, and The Bob Cummings Show. After Universal failed to renew her contract in 1959, Van Doren struggled to find work as a free agent. She starred in many B movies, such as Voyage to the Planet of Prehistoric Women (1968), The Las Vegas Hillbillys (1966) with Mansfield, and 3 Nuts in Search of a Bolt (1964), a film which challenged the Hays Code. The same year, she appeared in the June 1964 Playboy magazine with nude photos of her on the set of the film.

Van Doren has married five times and had intimate affairs with many other Hollywood actors. She went to Vietnam in the 1970s to entertain troops during the Vietnam War. Partially because of the sudden deaths of Mansfield and Monroe, she decided to retire from acting. In 1987 Van Doren released her autobiography, Playing the Field: My Story. On February 1, 1994, she received her star on the Hollywood Walk of Fame. In 1998, she created her website, describing herself as “the first authentic kitten on Cyberspace".

== Early life ==
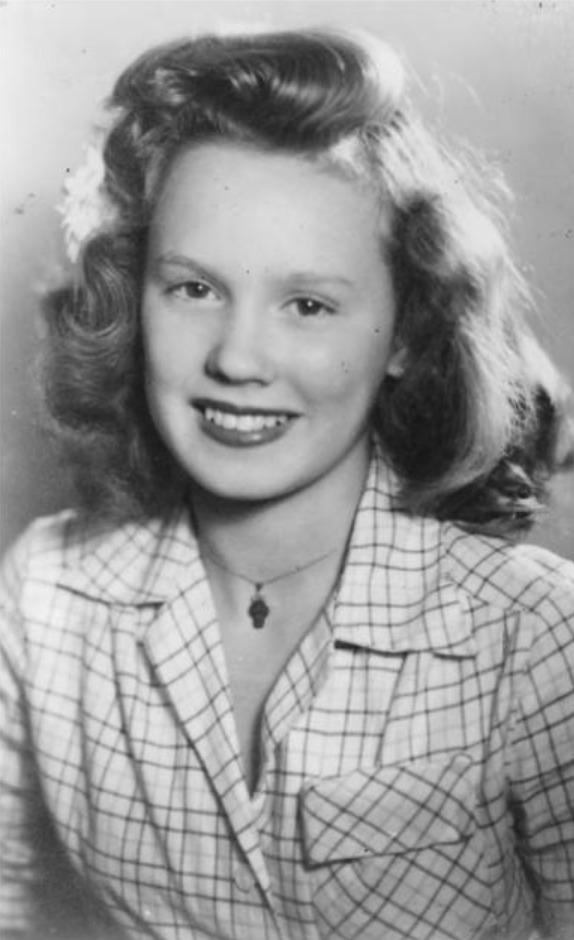
Van Doren in 1944, at 13 years old

Van Doren was born Joan Lucille Olander on February 6, 1931, in Rowena, South Dakota, nine miles out of Sioux Falls. She is the daughter of Warner Carl Olander (1908–1992) and Lucille Harriet Bennett (1912–1995). Olander and Bennett had met at a Swedish Lutheran Church which had been partially built by them. They married in August 1930. She was named after Joan Crawford, a favorite actress of her mother. She is of three-quarters Swedish and mixed Irish and German descent. Van Doren's father, Warner Olander, worked at a rock quarry, being paid $0.35 cents a load, sometimes earning $7.00 in a day. According to Van Doren, the town consisted of a church, school, railroad station, and a connected filling station, grocery store, a grain elevator, and a hardware store owned by her great-uncle. Her maternal grandmother was born in Gothenburg, Sweden.

In 1939 Van Doren's parents moved to Sioux City, Iowa, where her father got a better job as a mechanic. This led to Van Doren moving onto her maternal grandparents', the Bennetts, 160-acre farm in Rowena. Van Doren later reflected on this, saying in her 1987 autobiography Playing the Field, "It was the Depression, times were that hard." She described in her memoir that her grandmother, whom she called "Dah", was an important household figure, while her grandfather, "Pa", took Van Doren into town weekly. She additionally lived with her maternal uncle on the farm. Van Doren also recalls in her autobiography her first experience flying a plane on the ranch. Van Doren would walk a mile and a half to a two-room schoolhouse on the ranch in any weather.

Van Doren grew up sickly, having three operations before the age of seven. She claimed having had a temperature of 106 °F (41.1 °C), yet maintained her grandmother still brought her to school because she wanted to be by herself on the ranch. She almost died at four from a hemorrhage and had a bump removed from her face, which left a small scar and caused her to be bullied in school.

Van Doren moved to Sioux City, Iowa, in 1939 to live with her parents, where she watched movies starring actors such as Clark Gable, Carole Lombard, Spencer Tracy, Fred Astaire, Katharine Hepburn, Jean Harlow, Mae West, and Ginger Rogers. She was impressionistic, writing in her memoir, "The other thing the movies seemed to promise was love. In every one of those celluloid fairy tales, the heroine lived happily ever after in the company of the man she loved. How I yearned for that. It was then that I set my heart on becoming a Hollywood star." In May 1942 when Van Doren was 11, her family moved to Los Angeles. After staying at a boarding house, Van Doren and her family moved to an apartment on Raymond Avenue, where Van Doren had to sneak through the door. Van Doren and her family soon moved to a bigger apartment.

According to Van Doren, a man exposed his penis to her while she was in a car heading to her home. In her 1964 book, “My Naughty, Naughty Life!,” she recalls the event saying, "For weeks – and occasionally even years later – that man returned to me in my sleep, leaving me a neurotic young girl and even upsetting me as a woman. For several months after that experience, I found myself hating boys and looking upon men as animals. But I'm glad that hatred never lasted."

After her thirteenth birthday, Van Doren convinced the manager of Hollywood Pantages Theatre to make her an usherette, which allowed her to watch popular movies for free. Van Doren often spent time at a drugstore, inspired by the myth of the discovery of Lana Turner at Schwab's Pharmacy. At this point, Van Doren had already dyed her hair platinum blonde.

After being commented on by Nils Thor Granlund, known by his initials NTG, that she looked similar to Jean Harlow, she was cast on his Hollywood TV show in a minor role. However, her parents were worried that she would get in trouble and feared that she would go on to be killed like the Black Dahlia, a still unidentified murder victim whom Van Doren claimed was one of their closest friends. Despite that, Van Doren went on Granlund's show, coated in white pancake makeup and brown lipstick. Van Doren stated that Granlund's show was a prototype of the modern talk show. While making the show, she was known as Little Joanie, the Flower Girl. Van Doren and her mother became friends with Granlund. Van Doren also sang with Ted Fio Rito's Band.

At the Montecito Hotel in Palm Springs, in the summer of 1949, Van Doren was encouraged to enter the Miss Palm Springs competition, sponsored by the hotel. She won the title, and was subsequently invited to become the Los Angeles Press Club's beauty queen, Miss Eight Ball. Following this, she dropped out of Los Angeles High School, which she had hated.

== Acting career ==
=== 1949–1953: Beginnings ===
Film producer Howard Hughes pursued Van Doren after she was crowned Miss Palm Springs, and, according to Van Doren, his first question was, "Are you a virgin?" Van Doren said that he was controlling when they dated. She said in a 2005 interview that Hughes took her to a spot on Vermont Avenue for a braless photoshoot in a white sweater. Van Doren would often meet Howard Hughes at the Garden of Allah Hotel. Hughes signed Van Doren a four-film contract with RKO.

In 1950 Hughes gave Van Doren an uncredited bit part in Jet Pilot (1957) at RKO Radio Pictures, which was filmed from 1949 to 1950 but released in 1957. The title, which starred John Wayne and Janet Leigh, was her film debut. She said that she had a good experience with Leigh, who allowed Van Doren to fly in her jet. Her line of dialogue consisted of one word, "Look!". Van Doren had a small role in Footlight Varieties (1951) as the girl in the theater in the final scene of the film. Van Doren appeared uncredited in Two Tickets to Broadway (1951). The film starred Tony Martin and former co-star Janet Leigh.

Van Doren did a few more bit parts in movies at RKO, including His Kind of Woman (1951), starring Robert Mitchum, Jane Russell, and Vincent Price. The film was shot on the back lot of the David O. Selznick Studio. About her appearance in this movie, Van Doren said, "If you blinked, you would miss me. I looked barely old enough to drive." She was on the film for three months and, because of the money she earned, bought an MG car. Van Doren also met Gloria Swanson who asked her, "Is that your real color of hair?"

Van Doren was coached by Natasha Lytess, who had also coached Marilyn Monroe. The two actresses met several times when Van Doren was being coached by Lytess. However, Van Doren stopped her lessons with Lytess because "Natasha spent most of our lessons talking, however, and there was very little time left, after her long-winded speeches on the art of acting, to actually perform for her".

In her memoir, Van Doren tells of her relationship with Charles Fischetti, an American mobster and the cousin of Al Capone, whom she met in Las Vegas who often sent money to Van Doren from Chicago. He died of a heart attack in 1951.

Danielle Cory, an RKO worker and friend of Van Doren, suggested that Van Doren work on stage for the play Billion Dollar Baby, which began her stage career as a showgirl. The show was held at the Proser Cafe Theatre, near Jack Dempsey's restaurant. Cory additionally suggested that Van Doren should audition for Alberto Vargas to be one of the "Vargas Girls" in Esquire. Vargas ended up picking Van Doren as one of his models.

In New York City Van Doren met boxer Jack Dempsey at the Jack Dempsey's Broadway Restaurant. Dempesy frequented the Billion Dollar Baby show and held a celebration for the cast. Dempsey requested to have dinner with Van Doren, which they later had at the Stork Club, and they had a conversation with Sherman Billingsley, the founder of the venue. Since Dempsey was treated as a celebrity, the couple went to many other clubs, such as the Copacabana and the 21 Club. Dempsey got engaged to Van Doren, then decided to move back to Hollywood because she thought it would be better for her career. According to Barry Lowe, Van Doren was, "Near penniless, out of work, and frightened for the future" due to Billion Dollar Baby not being successful.

At the request of Sammy Fain, Van Doren met songwriter Jimmy McHugh. McHugh had an interest in Van Doren's career and became her manager. Van Doren has stated that since she was managed by McHugh, who was dating gossip columnist Louella Parsons, that Parsons disliked her. McHugh told Van Doren that he would enroll her in a drama school and additionally arranged for her to be at Ben Bard's Theater. Bard had an acting school and put on plays that were attended by film scouts, casting agents, and directors. Van Doren was in Bard's theater productions, such as Once in a Lifetime and At War with the Army. At Bard's school Van Doren was given advice by Carolyn Jones, and she was taught by Aaron Spelling in private, which broke Bard's school rules. Van Doren also went to many of McHugh's parties, attended by Darryl F. Zanuck, Louis B. Mayer, and Buddy Adler. This allowed Van Doren to have a screen test for Paramount Pictures.

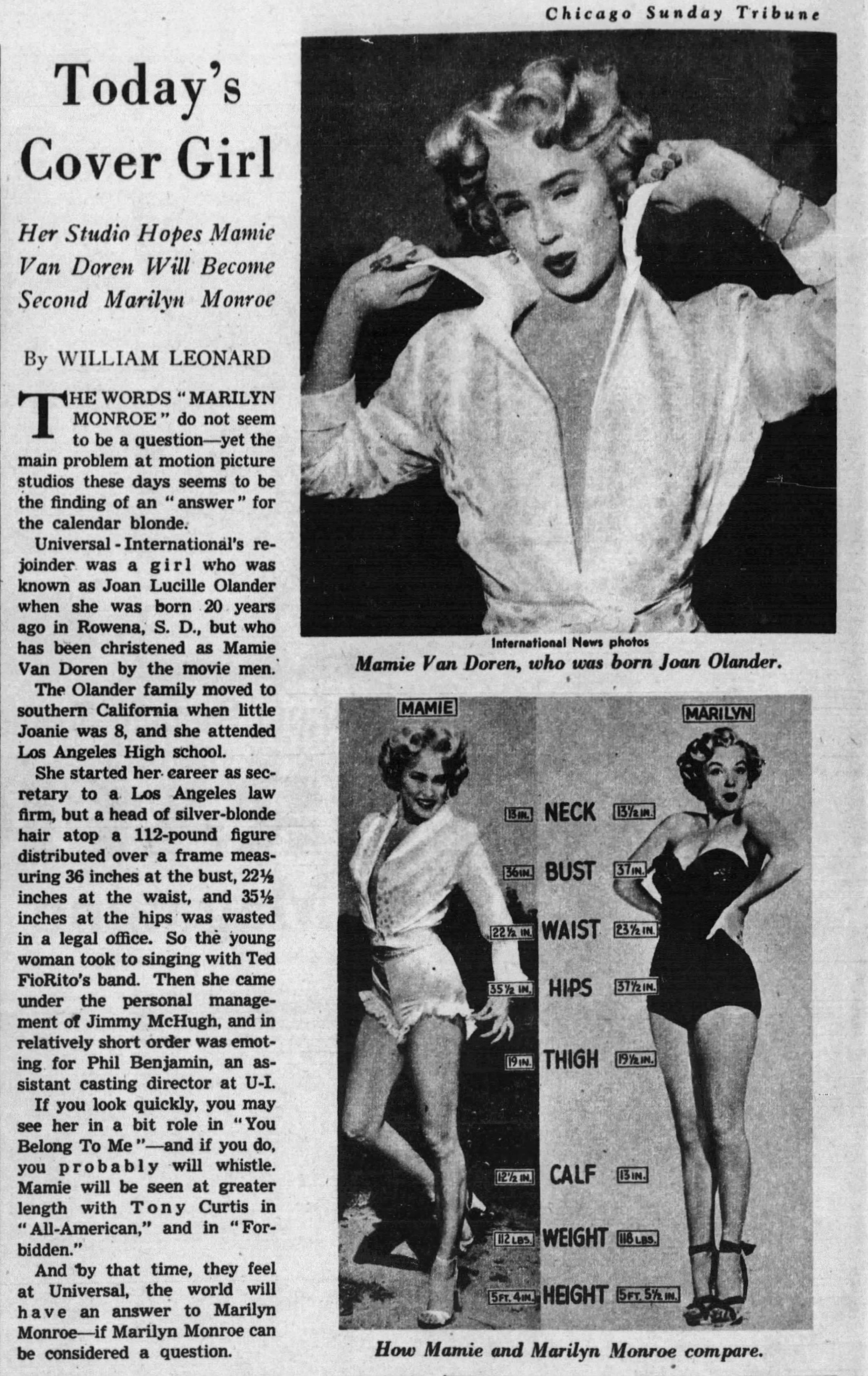
Newspaper article comparing Van Doren with Marilyn Monroe, July 26, 1953

.Van Doren says in her autobiography, Playing the Field, that she decided to do a scene from The Big Knife for her Paramount screen test. Van Doren later stated that during the audition, "I played the scene with as much intensity as I had ever played a role, feeling the character's pain and anguish so acutely that it became my own.” After the audition, according to Van Doren, McHugh told her, "They're going to offer you a contract.", Paramount decided not to sign Van Doren a few days later. Van Doren stated that Paramount gave the reason of her looking too similar to Marilyn Monroe, and she believes that it was because Parsons pressured Paramount into not signing her.

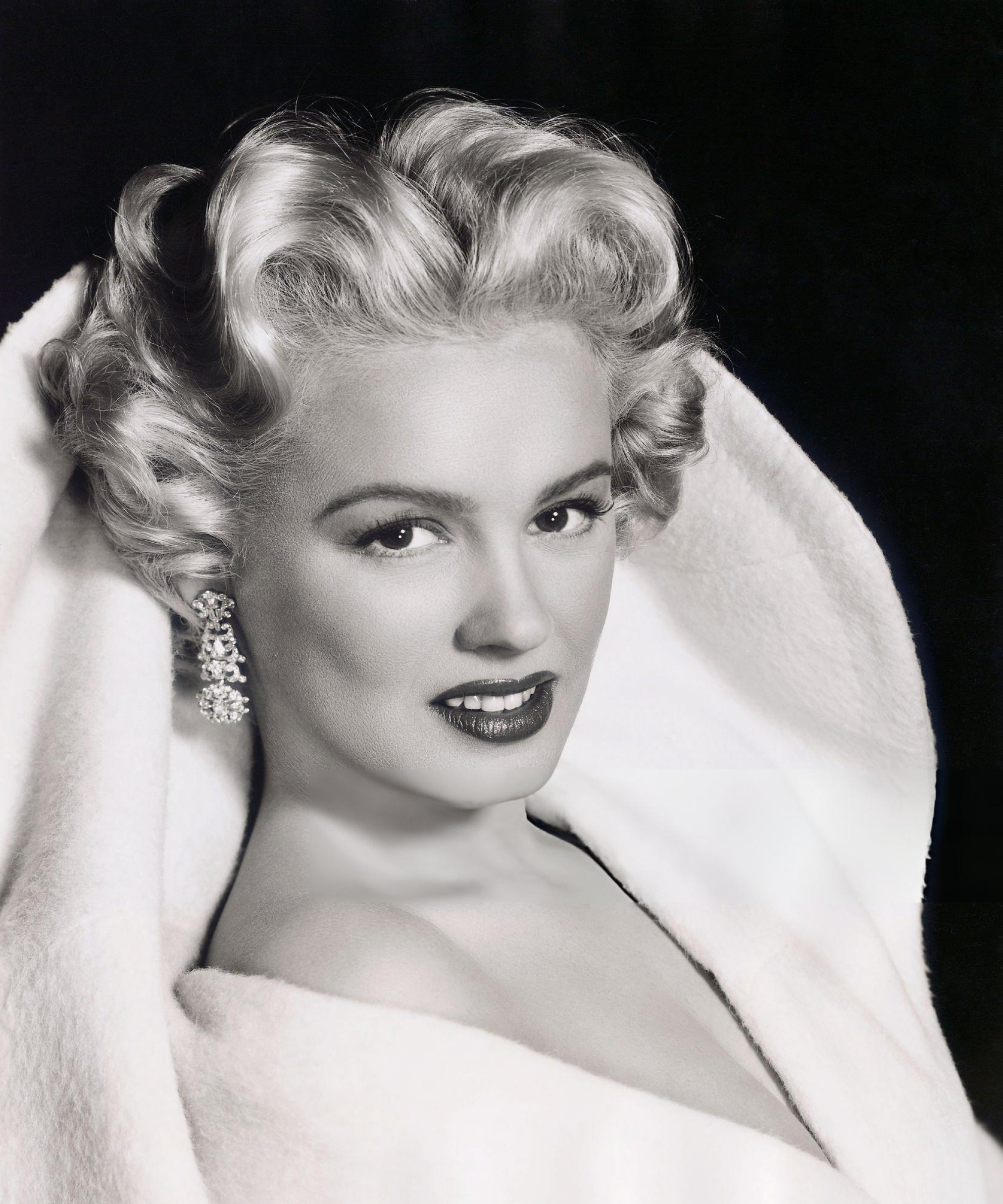
1953 publicity photo for Universal

Van Doren performed in the Bliss-Hayden Theater. McHugh had called the Harry Hayden, manager of the theater, and made time for Van Doren to perform. While performing, Van Doren caught the attention of Phil Benjamin, a Universal casting director, who was in the audience. Benjamin called McHugh, and Van Doren met Benjamin at Universal Studios. Benjamin believed that Van Doren was fit for the role of a singer in the upcoming Universal film Forbidden (1953), starring Tony Curtis. Van Doren met the director of Forbidden, Rudolph Maté, and requested that Van Doren sing "I Can't Give You Anything but Love, Baby", one of McHugh's songs. Maté approved, and Van Doren filmed the scene shortly after.

On January 20, 1953, Van Doren signed a seven-year contract with Universal. Van Doren, whose signing day coincided with the Inauguration of Dwight D. Eisenhower, was given the first name "Mamie" after Eisenhower's wife, Mamie Eisenhower. She was given the last name "Van Doren" after Van Doren was told by the studio that she looked more Dutch than Swedish. Universal had intended for Van Doren to be their "answer to Marilyn Monroe." However, unlike other Marilyn Monroe lookalikes, Van Doren did not portray the "dumb blonde" role in films.

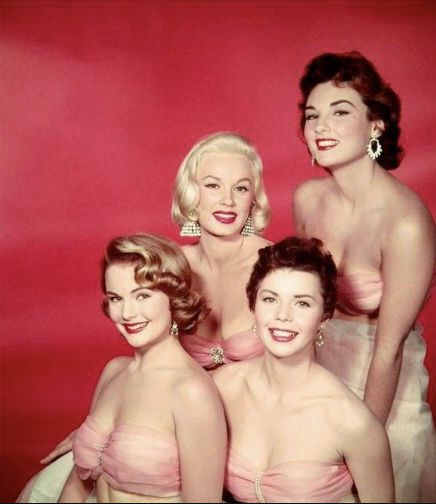
Photo of "Universal starlets" in 1954 (from left: Myrna Hansen, Mamie Van Doren, Allison Hayes, Colleen Miller)

In January 1953 Van Doren took college courses from professors at University of California while training to be an actress at Universal. She also took lessons for horseback riding, diction, scene study, and ballet. On February 26, 1953, Van Doren went on a date with Rock Hudson, arranged by Universal, for the 10th Golden Globe Awards. According to Van Doren herself, she had an encounter with Joan Crawford, who "drunkenly tried to flirt with Rock [Hudson]." Midway through the event, Van Doren had a conversation with Monroe while doing her lipstick. In her autobiography, Van Doren describes engaging in sexual activity with Hudson at her parents' house after the event had ended.

=== 1953–1960: Rise to prominence ===
Van Doren's first major role was in The All American (1953), a college football film directed by Jesse Hibbs. The film centers on a college quarterback whose life takes a turn after his parents die in a car accident. Van Doren later said that Hibbs encouraged her to fondle him and often put her hand at his groin during rehearsals. The film also starred Tony Curtis, Lori Nelson, and Richard Long. In The All American, Van Doren played Susie Ward, an ambitious waitress initially looking to find a wealthy spouse near a university. Susie Ward is a sultry, flirtatious, and manipulative person who tricks an inebriated person into proposing to her. Due to good reviews from Universal-International executives, Van Doren was sent on tour to promote the film.

Van Doren's second major film was the 1954 film Yankee Pasha. The film was based on Edison Marshall's 1947 novel of the same name, which Universal had recently purchased. Yankee Pasha revolves around a man who sails the ocean, played by Jeff Chandler, to find his true love, a woman forced into slavery, portrayed by Rhonda Fleming. The eight-week shooting schedule exhausted Van Doren, resulting in weight loss. Van Doren has said that she was attracted to Joseph Pevney, director of Yankee Pasha. She had a relationship with him, and Van Doren said that she embraced Pevney in his office.

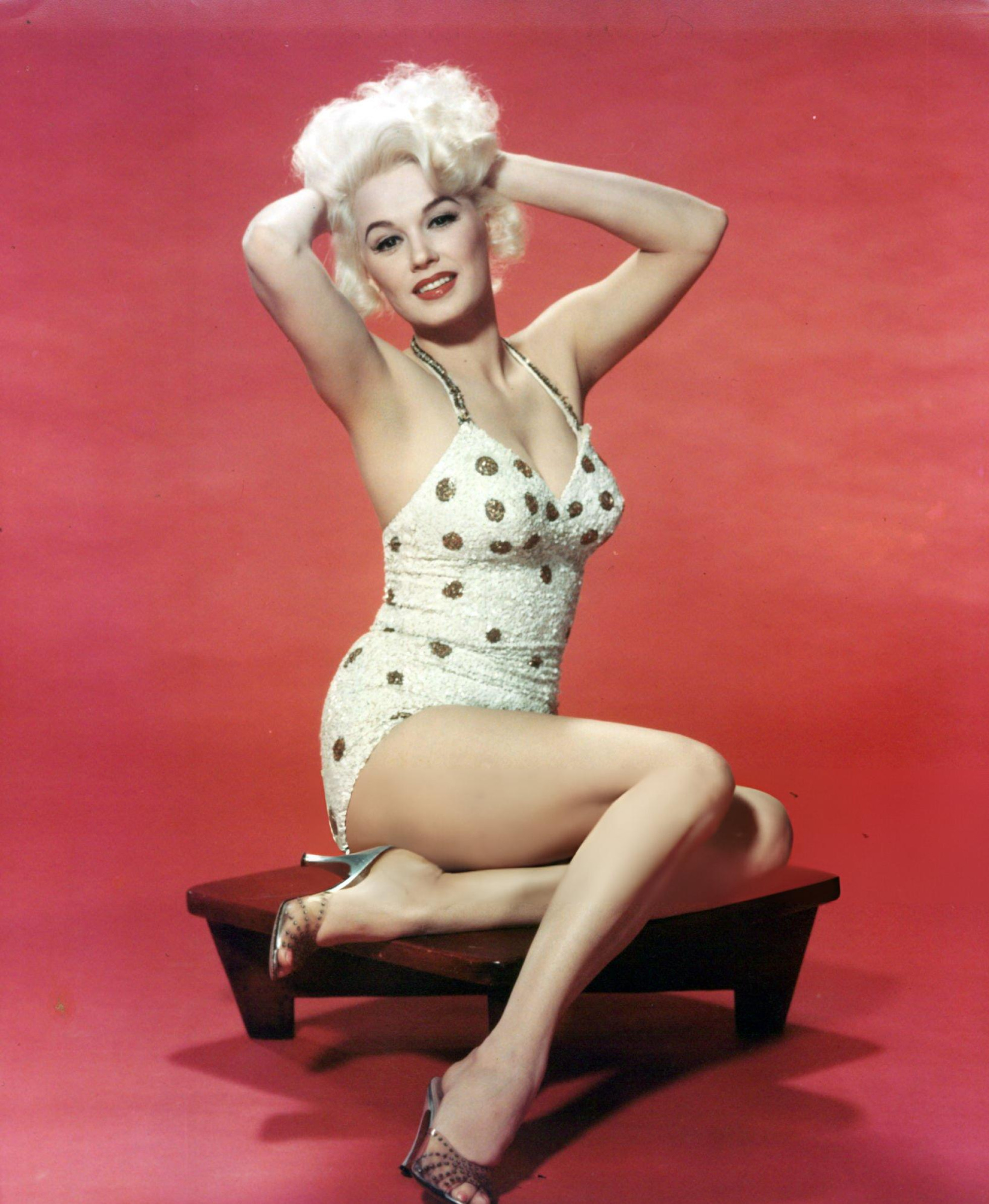
Van Doren in a swimsuit photoshoot in 1955

In Playing the Field, Van Doren claimed that she auditioned for 20th Century Fox Metro-Goldwyn-Mayer was not the studio that released the film, hoping to get the role of Ado Annie in the film version of the Rodgers and Hammerstein musical Oklahoma!. Despite Richard Rodgers and Oscar Hammerstein II liking her audition, she was denied the role which was given to Gloria Grahame instead.

Van Doren starred in the 1954 film Francis Joins the WACS, playing the role of Corporal Bunky Hilstrom. Universal also let Van Doren go to the 1954 premiere of The Glenn Miller Story with Conrad "Nicky" Hilton Jr., son of Conrad Hilton. Van Doren later entered into a relationship with him. Van Doren has recounted that Conrad Hilton disapproved of her being in a relationship with Nicky Hilton. Van Doren almost ended her romantic relationship with Hilton due to his behavior on a double-date with her friend.

Van Doren completely ended her relationship with Hilton while shooting Edward Buzzell's Ain't Misbehavin' (1955), with Van Doren starring as "Jackie". In the film, Van Doren was cast as a dumb blonde. Van Doren became annoyed that she kept getting similar roles. On the set, she met Prince Axel of Denmark. Prince Axel was in contact with Van Doren and invited her to several events. However, Van Doren was in a relationship with bandleader Ray Anthony.

Van Doren began working on The Second Greatest Sex, a film directed by George Marshall, in May 1955. The film co-stars Jeanne Crain and George Nader.

Van Doren appeared opposite an uncredited and unknown Clint Eastwood in Star in the Dust. Though Van Doren garnered prominent billing alongside John Agar and Richard Boone, she appears rather briefly as the daughter of a ranch owner. By this time, Van Doren had grown tired of Universal which was casting her in non-breakthrough roles. Van Doren began accepting bigger and better roles in better movies from other studios.

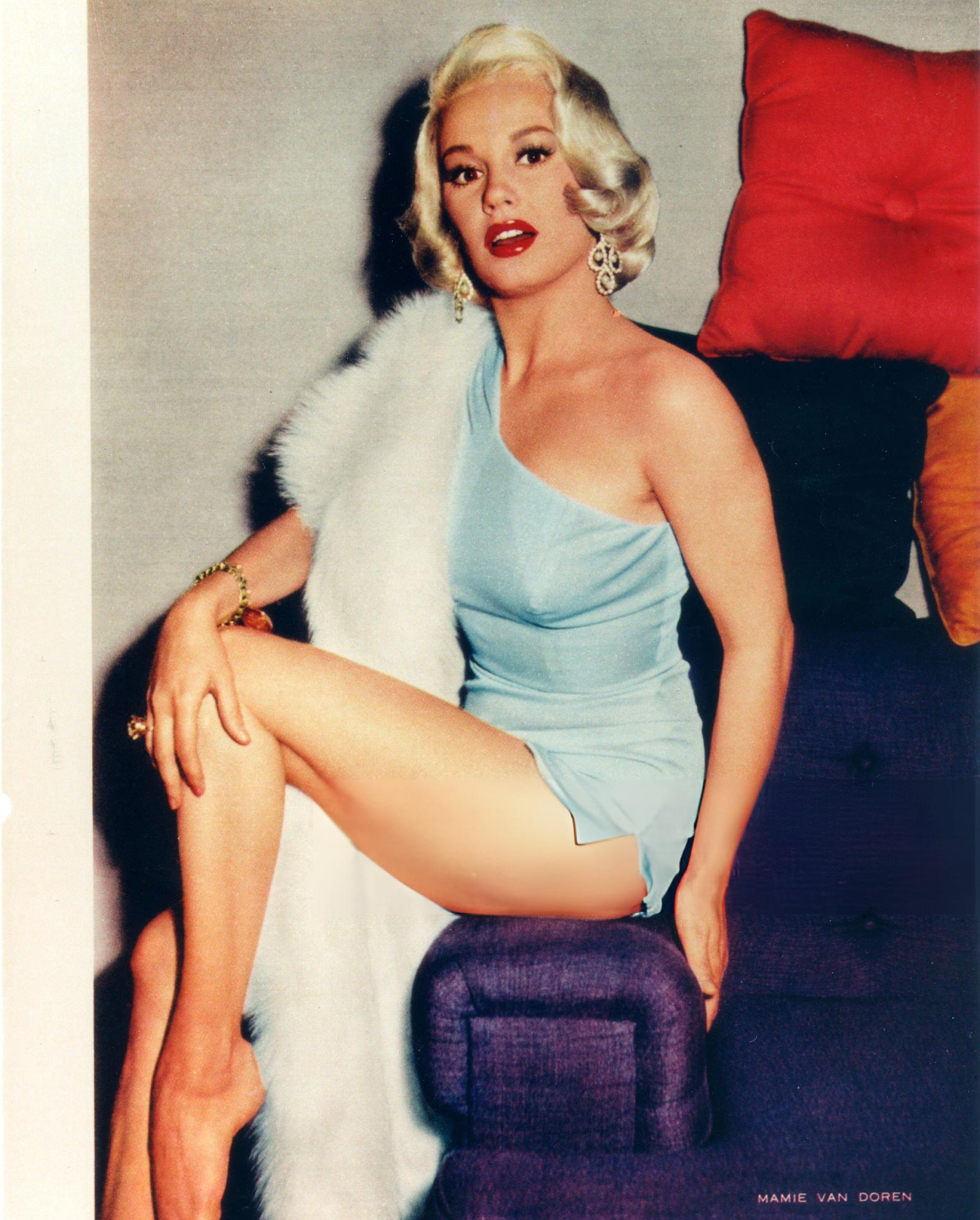
Van Doren in 1958

Van Doren went on to star in several bad girl movies that later became cult films. She also appeared in some of the first movies to feature rock 'n' roll music and became identified with this rebellious style, and she made some rock records. One of her rock 'n' roll films, Untamed Youth, was later featured in the 1990 Mystery Science Theater 3000 episode "Untamed Youth".

Some of Van Doren's more noteworthy movies include Teacher's Pet (1958) at Paramount Pictures, Born Reckless (1958) at Warner Brothers, High School Confidential (1958), and The Beat Generation (1959), the latter two at Metro-Goldwyn-Mayer. Van Doren has said Teacher's Pet is her favorite role, as she got to work with Clark Gable. Van Doren was just as well known for her provocative roles. She was in prison for Girls Town (1959), which provoked censors with a shower scene where audiences could see Van Doren's naked back. As Eve in The Private Lives of Adam and Eve (1960), she wore only fig leaves, and in other films like The Beautiful Legs of Sabrina (1959), Sex Kittens Go to College (1960), and Vice Raid (1960), audiences understood the nature of the films from the titles.

=== 1959–present: Later career ===
After Universal Studios chose not to renew her contract in 1959, Van Doren became a free agent and struggled to find work. Some of her later movies were foreign and independent productions, which did little to keep her image in the public's eye. Many of the productions were low-budget B movies with some having gained a cult following for their high camp value.

The first of these later films was Sex Kittens Go to College (1960), which co-starred Tuesday Weld and Mijanou Bardot, sister of sultry French actress Brigitte Bardot. Following the completion of the Argentine film The Blonde from Buenos Aires (1961), Van Doren took time off from her career. She came back in The Candidate (1964), soon followed by Freddy in the Wild West, both of which were low-budget films that made little impact. In 1964, Tommy Noonan convinced Van Doren to appear in 3 Nuts in Search of a Bolt. Van Doren had turned down Noonan's previous offer to star opposite Jayne Mansfield in Promises! Promises! and was replaced with Marie McDonald. In 3 Nuts in Search of a Bolt, Mamie did a beer-bath scene where she is seen nude. She posed for Playboy to promote the film.

Van Doren next appeared in The Las Vegas Hillbillys (1966) released by Woolner Brothers. This film co-starred Mansfield; this was the only time two of "The Three M's" appeared together in a film. A sequel was titled Hillbillys in a Haunted House, but Van Doren turned this role down, and was replaced by Joi Lansing. She then appeared in The Navy vs. the Night Monsters (1966), a science fiction movie. In 1967, she appeared in You've Got to Be Smart, and starred in the science fiction film Voyage to the Planet of Prehistoric Women (1968), the following year, directed by Peter Bogdanovich.

In 1970, Van Doren had a supporting role in the western comedy The Arizona Kid. In 1975, she starred in the film That Girl From Boston, adapted from a Robert Rimmer novel, but the film was never released. Since then, Van Doren has appeared only in cameos in low-budget films. Van Doren's last film appearance was a role in the direct-to-video drama The American Tetralogy (2013). Van Doren's guest appearances on television include Jukebox Jury, What's My Line, The Bob Cummings Show, The Jack Benny Show, Fantasy Island, Burke's Law, Vega$ and L.A. Law. Van Doren also developed a nightclub act and performed in live theater. She performed in stage productions of Gentlemen Prefer Blondes and Dames at Sea at the Drury Lane Theater in Chicago as well as appeared in Will Success Spoil Rock Hunter? and The Tender Trap at the Arlington Park Theater. In the 1970s, Van Doren performed a nightclub act in Las Vegas.

Van Doren has a star on the Hollywood Walk of Fame at 7057 Hollywood Boulevard. In 2005, a Golden Palm Star on the Palm Springs Walk of Stars was dedicated to her.

Since 2025, Mamie Exposed! The Life and Loves of the Last Blonde Bombshell, a documentary about Van Doren's life and career, has been in production. In 2026, she released her memoir, You Thought I Was Dead: My Life of Celebrities, Sex, and Champagne.

== Other ventures ==
Van Doren was never a Playboy Playmate, but she posed twice for the magazine in 1964 to promote her movie 3 Nuts in Search of a Bolt (1964). By this point in her career, her figure measured 38DD-26-36 (self-described in 1997). She said "I don't even want to say double-D because they're even bigger than that."

In 1964, Van Doren was a guest at the Whisky a Go Go on the Sunset Strip in West Hollywood, California when The Beatles were at the club visiting with Jayne Mansfield, and an inebriated George Harrison accidentally threw his drink on her when trying to throw it on some bothersome journalists. During the Vietnam War, she gave tours for U.S. troops in Vietnam for three months in 1968, and again in 1970. In addition to USO shows, she visited hospitals, including the wards of amputees and burn victims.

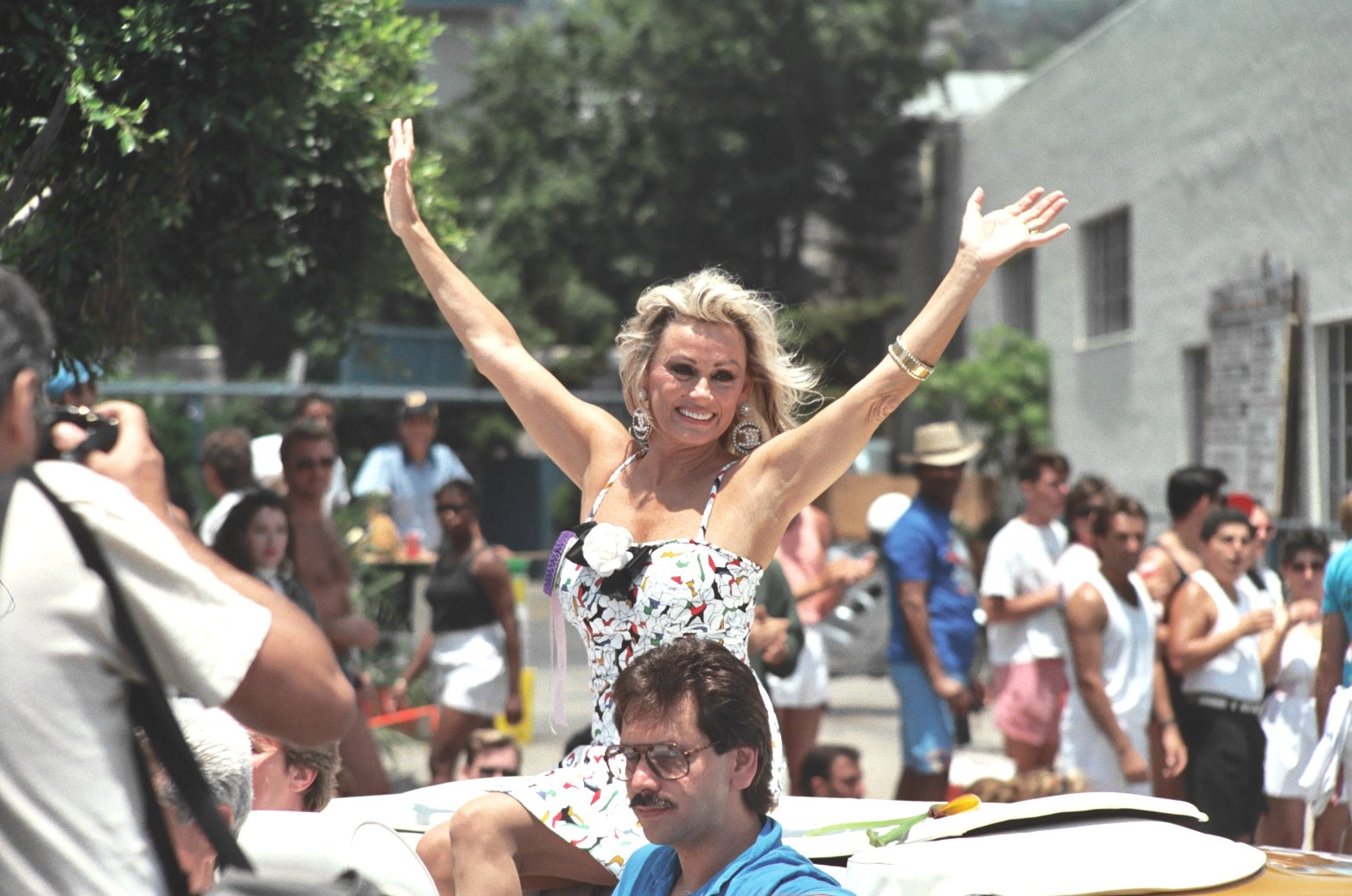
Van Doren at a gay pride parade in Los Angeles in 1987

Van Doren released Playing the Field (1987), her autobiography, which brought much attention and proved to be her biggest media splash in over 25 years. She has consistently denied in interviews ever having breast implants. In 2006, Mamie posed for photographs for Vanity Fair with Pamela Anderson as part of its annual Hollywood issue. The same year, she expressed opposition to the Iraq War. In an interview with Fox News in February 2020, Van Doren announced that she was working on a follow-up to her autobiography. She remarked that "...a lot has happened between 1987 and 2020. So now I'm writing about what it's like getting older and appreciating life a little more as you go along, as well as getting smarter as you get older. There's so much to write about." Van Doren practices Buddhism.

The title of her follow-up book was announced in December 2021 as China & Me: Wind Flapping, Feather Pulling, and Love on the Wing, a memoir about her pet parrot China. Van Doren describes the story as "a look behind the curtain into my everyday life. It's often funny, but, like so many things in life, it has its moments of sadness. Over the decades I've integrated a wild animal into a human household, played matchmaker to find him a mate, and cared for his offspring. I'm blessed to have had China as companion, confessor, and straight man all these years; and he's still with me today." The book was published in September 2022.

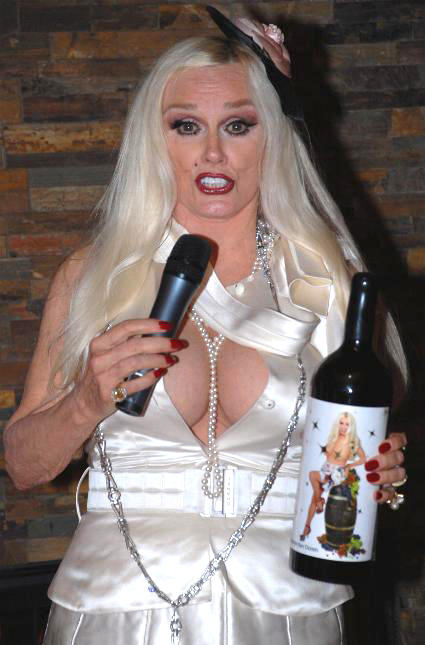
Van Doren in 2007

In an interview with Closer in January 2021, she reflected on the #MeToo movement, saying 'I've thought a lot about that. There are some things I would question, but I've also always been behind any woman with a problem because I have had plenty of them myself. [In my time] if I wanted to go to bed with someone, I'd go to bed with them, but I never did it for a movie. [A predator] would know that he was in for a fight if he ever came around me. [It would be] nails out, kicking and screaming.'

Van Doren had a website from the late 90s to the early 2010s. Van Doren had a theater section, where she would post various movies. She also showed many nude and semi-nude images taken by Julie Strain. Van Doren started her own blog on which she regularly writes about a very diverse array of topics. As of July 2023 she is still posting to her blog. Van Doren holds mostly liberal views, having supported President Joe Biden, and Vice President Kamala Harris.

== Personal life ==
=== Marriages and relationships ===
==== Jack Newman ====
Van Doren met sportswear and shirt manufacturer Jack Newman around 1949, with Newman being one of her father's friends with whom she attended boxing matches. Van Doren and Newman soon got engaged and married in 1950 in Santa Barbara. They honeymooned in San Francisco. Van Doren said in her book, Playing the Field, "When Jack asked me to marry him, I swiftly agreed. He was my ticket out of my parents' house and into womanhood. We eloped to Santa Barbara, where I lied about my age to the judge who married us." Van Doren enjoyed Newman's wealthy lifestyle, as Newman had lived in a luxury apartment in Beverly Hills, California. According to Van Doren, Newman quickly got jealous of Van Doren due to her often being glanced at in the outfits Newman purchased for her. She divorced him after six months due to his abusive behavior, including a time that Van Doren described in her memoir in which he threatened to throw her off a second-story balcony, which was quickly disbanded by neighbors and a time when Newman shredded Van Doren's favorite hat.

Van Doren and then-fiancé Jack Dempsey at the Stork Club in 1951

Before their divorce was finalized, Van Doren began dating 55-year-old boxer Jack Dempsey. They became engaged, but she broke off the relationship after signing with Universal, who urged her to find a younger boyfriend to enhance her image.

==== Ray Anthony ====
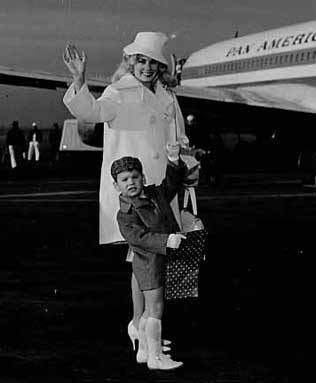
Van Doren and her only son, Perry, in Buenos Aires, Argentina in 1960

In 1955, Van Doren began a relationship with Ray Anthony, Anthony was in the process of being filmed for Daddy Long Legs (1955). After he finished filming, he went on a vacation to Hawaii with Van Doren. On the short vacation, Van Doren and Anthony often embraced each other while photographers followed the two. The trip allowed Van Doren to spend time with Anthony. However, the trip ended because Anthony had to attend the premiere of Daddy Long Legs. The two married on August 29, 1955, in Toledo. The following year, the two welcomed son Perry Ray, who would be Van Doren's only child. He had been conceived before the two married. After his birth, Van Doren moved away from Hollywood, hoping to keep her son away from its obscenities. Van Doren filed for divorce in 1958, citing Anthony's cruelty and long absences, and it was finalized in 1961, with Van Doren being granted custody of Perry. At the time, Van Doren was in a relationship with college student Tony Santorro, though they had no intention of marrying.

==== Lee Meyers ====
On July 1, 1966, she married Lee Meyers, a pitcher for the California Angels, in Boise, Idaho. When they married, she was 33 and he was 19. In her memoir, she recalled she had only married him because she had become pregnant by football player Joe Namath and wanted to avoid a scandal. She convinced him to marry her after she lied the baby was his. Eventually, however, the marriage began to crumble; filled with regret and seeing no other option, she aborted the baby. She divorced him in Santa Ana only a year after they married due to his wild personality and drug use; he died shortly after in a car crash.

== Filmography ==
- Footlight Varieties (1951)
- His Kind of Woman (1951)
- Two Tickets to Broadway (1951)
- Forbidden (1953)
- The All American (1953)
- Hawaiian Nights (1954)
- Yankee Pasha (1954)
- Francis Joins the WACS (1954)
- Ain't Misbehavin' (1955)
- The Second Greatest Sex (1955)
- Running Wild (1955)
- Star in the Dust (1956)
- Untamed Youth (1957)
- The Girl in Black Stockings (1957)
- Jet Pilot (1957)
- Teacher's Pet (1958)
- High School Confidential (1958)
- Born Reckless (1958)
- Guns, Girls, and Gangsters (1959)
- The Beat Generation (1959)
- The Beautiful Legs of Sabrina (1959)
- The Big Operator (1959)
- Girls Town (1959)
- Vice Raid (1960)
- College Confidential (1960)
- Sex Kittens Go to College (1960)
- The Private Lives of Adam and Eve (1960)
- The Blonde from Buenos Aires (1961)
- The Candidate (1964)
- Freddy in the Wild West (1964)
- 3 Nuts in Search of a Bolt (1964)
- The Las Vegas Hillbillys (1966)
- The Navy vs. the Night Monsters (1966)
- You've Got to Be Smart (1967)
- Voyage to the Planet of Prehistoric Women (1968)
- The Arizona Kid (1970)
- That Girl from Boston (1975)
- Free Ride (1986)
- The Vegas Connection (1999)
- Slackers (2002)
- The American Tetralogy (2012)

== Discography ==
=== Albums ===
Year	Album	Format	Label
1957	Untamed Youth	EP	Prep Records
1976	Mamie – As in Mamie Van Doren	LP	Churchill Records
1986	The Girl Who Invented Rock 'n' Roll	LP	Rhino Records
1997	The Girl Who Invented Rock 'n' Roll	CD	Marginal Records
2011	Still a Troublemaker	CD/iTunes	Ferguson Records
2017	Ooh Ba La Baby: Her Exciting Rock N' Roll Recordings (1956–1959)	CD	Hoodoo Records

=== Singles ===
Year	Single	Format	Label
1957	Salamander/Go, Go, Calypso!	45 rpm	Prep Records
	Something to Dream About/I Fell in Love	45 rpm	Capitol Records
1958	Nobody but You/A Lifetime of Love	45 rpm	Dot Records
	Don't Fool Around, Sabrina (Be Mine, Be Mine, Be Mine)/Fashion for Ladies	45 rpm	RCA Records (Italy)
1959	The Beat Generation/I'm Grateful	45 rpm	Dot Records
1964	Bikini with No Top on the Top (with June Wilkinson)/So What Else Is New	45 rpm	Jubilee Records
1967	Cabaret/The Boy Catcher's Theme	45 rpm	Audio Fidelity
1984	State of Turmoil	12" Single	Corner Stone Records
1986	Young Dudes/Queen of Pleasure	12" Single	Rhino Records
2024	"I Told Ya I Love Ya, Now Get Out/Ich Liebe Dich" (with Pink Martini)	45 rpm	Heinz Records
2024	"Ich Liebe Dich" (with Pink Martini)	45 rpm	Heinz Records

== Awards and nominations ==
Year	Organization	Category	Result	Ref.
1949	Miss Palm Springs	—N/a	Won	
1949	Los Angeles Press Club	Miss Eight Ball	Won	
1957	Palm Springs Rodeo Queen	—N/a	Won	
1994	Hollywood Walk of Fame	Star - Motion Pictures	Honored	
2005	Palm Springs Walk of the Stars	Golden Palm Star	Honored	
2020	Roger Neal Oscar Viewing Gala	Icon Award	Honored	
2025	Cinecon Classic Film Festival	Cinecon Legacy Award	Honored	

== Bibliography ==
- Van Doren, Mamie (1987). Playing the Field: My Story. Putnam. ISBN 978-0399132407.
- Van Doren, Mamie (2022). China & Me: Wing Flapping, Feather Pulling, and Love on the Wing. Independently Published. ISBN 979-8351166513.
- Van Doren, Mamie (2026). You Thought I Was Dead. Permuted Press. ISBN 979-8895653234.

== See also ==
- Sex symbol
- Blonde bombshell
- Marilyn Monroe
- Jayne Mansfield
- Sheree North
- Tuesday Weld
