= Ben Lewis (editor) =

American film editor (1894–1970)

- Born: 1894; New York City, U.S.
- Died: December 29, 1970 (aged 75–76); Los Angeles, California, U.S.
- Occupation: Film editor
- Years active: 191?–1969 (film & TV)

Ben Lewis (1894–1970) was an American film editor who worked in Hollywood for over 50 years. He was employed by MGM for many years, beginning his career with them in the silent era. An early credit was for Quality Street (1927) starring Marion Davies. Among his most famous films were Kismet (1944), The Red Badge of Courage (1951) and The Four Horsemen of the Apocalypse (1962). He retired in 1969 and died 18 months later of cancer on December 29, 1970. His brother, Joe, was a film director.

== Filmography ==
Ben Lewis began his career as an editor. Based on Lewis' filmography at the Internet Movie Database.

Editor
| Year | Film | Director | Notes | Other notes |
|---|---|---|---|---|
| 1925 | Ben-Hur: A Tale of the Christ | Fred Niblo | | |
| 1926 | The Devil's Circus | Benjamin Christensen | | |
| 1926 | Money Talks | Archie Mayo | | |
| 1926 | The Boob | William A. Wellman | First collaboration with William A. Wellman | |
| 1926 | The Flaming Forest | Reginald Barker | | |
| 1927 | Mr. Wu | William Nigh | First collaboration with William Nigh | |
| 1927 | Quality Street | Sidney Franklin | First collaboration with Sidney Franklin | |
| 1928 | Under the Black Eagle | W. S. Van Dyke | First collaboration with W. S. Van Dyke | |
| 1928 | Across to Singapore | William Nigh | Second collaboration with William Nigh | |
| 1928 | White Shadows in the South Seas | W. S. Van Dyke | Second collaboration with W. S. Van Dyke | |
| 1928 | Honeymoon | Robert A. Golden | | |
| 1929 | A Single Man | Harry Beaumont | First collaboration with Harry Beaumont | |
| 1929 | The Pagan | W. S. Van Dyke | Third collaboration with W. S. Van Dyke | |
| 1929 | Thunder | William Nigh | Third collaboration with William Nigh | |
| 1929 | The Kiss | Jacques Feyder | | |
| 1931 | Trader Horn | W. S. Van Dyke | Fourth collaboration with W. S. Van Dyke | |
| 1931 | Never the Twain Shall Meet | W. S. Van Dyke | Fifth collaboration with W. S. Van Dyke | |
| 1931 | The Man in Possession | Sam Wood | First collaboration with Sam Wood | |
| 1932 | Tarzan the Ape Man | W. S. Van Dyke | Sixth collaboration with W. S. Van Dyke | |
| 1932 | Night Court | W. S. Van Dyke | Seventh collaboration with W. S. Van Dyke | |
| 1932 | The Washington Masquerade | Charles Brabin | First collaboration with Charles Brabin | |
| 1932 | The Mask of Fu Manchu | Charles Brabin | Second collaboration with Charles Brabin | |
| 1933 | Whistling in the Dark | Elliott Nugent | | |
| 1933 | Fast Workers | Tod Browning | First collaboration with Tod Browning | |
| 1933 | The Stranger's Return | King Vidor | | Uncredited |
| 1933 | Dinner at Eight | George Cukor | | |
| 1933 | Broadway to Hollywood | Willard Mack | | |
| 1934 | You Can't Buy Everything | Charles Reisner | First collaboration with Charles Reisner | |
| 1934 | Manhattan Melodrama | W. S. Van Dyke | Eighth collaboration with W. S. Van Dyke | |
| 1934 | Have a Heart | David Butler | | |
| 1934 | A Wicked Woman | Charles Brabin | Third collaboration with Charles Brabin | |
| 1935 | Society Doctor | George B. Seitz | First collaboration with George B. Seitz | |
| 1935 | Mark of the Vampire | Tod Browning | Second collaboration with Tod Browning | |
| 1935 | Woman Wanted | George B. Seitz | Second collaboration with George B. Seitz | |
| 1936 | The Garden Murder Case | Edwin L. Marin | First collaboration with Edwin L. Marin | |
| 1936 | Moonlight Murder | Edwin L. Marin | Second collaboration with Edwin L. Marin | |
| 1936 | Speed | Edwin L. Marin | Third collaboration with Edwin L. Marin | |
| 1937 | Under Cover of Night | George B. Seitz | Third collaboration with George B. Seitz | |
| 1937 | The Good Earth | Sidney Franklin | Second collaboration with Sidney Franklin | Uncredited |
| 1937 | Personal Property | W. S. Van Dyke | Ninth collaboration with W. S. Van Dyke | |
| 1937 | They Gave Him a Gun | W. S. Van Dyke | Tenth collaboration with W. S. Van Dyke | |
| 1937 | Bad Guy | Edward L. Cahn | | |
| 1937 | The Last Gangster | Edward Ludwig | | |
| 1938 | Arsène Lupin Returns | George Fitzmaurice | First collaboration with George Fitzmaurice | |
| 1938 | Judge Hardy's Children | George B. Seitz | Fourth collaboration with George B. Seitz | |
| 1938 | Hold That Kiss | Edwin L. Marin | Fourth collaboration with Edwin L. Marin | |
| 1938 | Love Finds Andy Hardy | George B. Seitz | Fifth collaboration with George B. Seitz | |
| 1938 | Vacation from Love | George Fitzmaurice | Second collaboration with George Fitzmaurice | |
| 1938 | Out West with the Hardys | George B. Seitz | Sixth collaboration with George B. Seitz | |
| 1939 | Burn 'Em Up O'Connor | Edward Sedgwick | First collaboration with Edward Sedgwick | |
| 1939 | The Hardys Ride High | George B. Seitz | Seventh collaboration with George B. Seitz | |
| 1939 | Andy Hardy Gets Spring Fever | W. S. Van Dyke | Eleventh collaboration with W. S. Van Dyke | |
| 1939 | Judge Hardy and Son | George B. Seitz | Eighth collaboration with George B. Seitz | |
| 1940 | Forty Little Mothers | Busby Berkeley | First collaboration with Busby Berkeley | |
| 1940 | Strike Up the Band | Busby Berkeley | Second collaboration with Busby Berkeley | |
| 1940 | Gallant Sons | George B. Seitz | Ninth collaboration with George B. Seitz | |
| 1941 | Men of Boys Town | Norman Taurog | | Uncredited |
| 1941 | Love Crazy | Jack Conway | | |
| 1941 | Down in San Diego | Robert B. Sinclair | | |
| 1941 | Married Bachelor | Edward Buzzell | | |
| 1942 | The Bugle Sounds | S. Sylvan Simon | First collaboration with S. Sylvan Simon | |
| 1942 | Rio Rita | S. Sylvan Simon | Second collaboration with S. Sylvan Simon | |
| 1942 | Pacific Rendezvous | George Sidney | | |
| 1942 | For Me and My Gal | Busby Berkeley | Third collaboration with Busby Berkeley | |
| 1943 | Lassie Come Home | Fred M. Wilcox | First collaboration with Fred M. Wilcox | |
| 1943 | Whistling in Brooklyn | S. Sylvan Simon | Third collaboration with S. Sylvan Simon | |
| 1944 | Kismet | William Dieterle | | |
| 1944 | Lost in a Harem | Charles Reisner | Second collaboration with Charles Reisner | Uncredited |
| 1945 | Son of Lassie | S. Sylvan Simon | Fourth collaboration with S. Sylvan Simon | |
| 1945 | Abbott and Costello in Hollywood | S. Sylvan Simon | Fifth collaboration with S. Sylvan Simon | |
| 1946 | Bad Bascomb | S. Sylvan Simon | Sixth collaboration with S. Sylvan Simon | |
| 1946 | The Cockeyed Miracle | S. Sylvan Simon | Seventh collaboration with S. Sylvan Simon | |
| 1947 | The Mighty McGurk | John Waters | | |
| 1947 | Undercover Maisie | Harry Beaumont | Second collaboration with Harry Beaumont | |
| 1948 | Alias a Gentleman | Harry Beaumont | Third collaboration with Harry Beaumont | |
| 1948 | A Southern Yankee | Edward Sedgwick | Second collaboration with Edward Sedgwick | |
| 1949 | The Stratton Story | Sam Wood | Second collaboration with Sam Wood | |
| 1949 | Malaya | Richard Thorpe | First collaboration with Richard Thorpe | |
| 1950 | Ambush | Sam Wood | Third collaboration with Sam Wood | |
| 1950 | Three Little Words | Richard Thorpe | Second collaboration with Richard Thorpe | |
| 1951 | The Red Badge of Courage | John Huston | | |
| 1951 | The Unknown Man | Richard Thorpe | Third collaboration with Richard Thorpe | |
| 1951 | It's a Big Country | Richard Thorpe; John Sturges; Charles Vidor; Don Weis; Clarence Brown; William A. Wellman; Don Hartman | Fourth collaboration with Richard Thorpe; Second collaboration with William A. Wellman; First collaboration with Don Weis; First collaboration with John Sturges | |
| 1952 | Shadow in the Sky | Fred M. Wilcox | Second collaboration with Fred M. Wilcox | |
| 1952 | The Devil Makes Three | Andrew Marton | | |
| 1953 | The Girl Who Had Everything | Richard Thorpe | Fifth collaboration with Richard Thorpe | |
| 1953 | A Slight Case of Larceny | Don Weis | Second collaboration with Don Weis | |
| 1953 | Big Leaguer | Robert Aldrich | | |
| 1954 | Tennessee Champ | Fred M. Wilcox | Third collaboration with Fred M. Wilcox | |
| 1955 | Many Rivers to Cross | Roy Rowland | First collaboration with Roy Rowland | |
| 1955 | The Scarlet Coat | John Sturges | Second collaboration with John Sturges | |
| 1956 | The Last Hunt | Richard Brooks | | |
| 1956 | These Wilder Years | Roy Rowland | Second collaboration with Roy Rowland | |
| 1957 | Hot Summer Night | David Friedkin | First collaboration with David Friedkin | |
| 1957 | The Vintage | Jeffrey Hayden | | |
| 1957 | Tip on a Dead Jockey | Richard Thorpe | Sixth collaboration with Richard Thorpe | |
| 1958 | Handle with Care | David Friedkin | Second collaboration with David Friedkin | |
| 1958 | High School Confidential! | Jack Arnold | | |
| 1959 | Night of the Quarter Moon | Hugo Haas | | |
| 1959 | The Beat Generation | Charles F. Haas | First collaboration with Charles F. Haas | |
| 1959 | The Big Operator | Charles F. Haas | Second collaboration with Charles F. Haas | |
| 1960 | The Subterraneans | Ranald MacDougall | | |
| 1961 | Atlantis, the Lost Continent | George Pal | | |
| 1961 | The Honeymoon Machine | Richard Thorpe | Seventh collaboration with Richard Thorpe | |
| 1961 | The Lawbreakers | Joseph M. Newman | | |
| 1962 | The Four Horsemen of the Apocalypse | Vincente Minnelli | | |
| 1963 | Drums of Africa | James B. Clark | | |
| 1964 | Kissin' Cousins | Gene Nelson | First collaboration with Gene Nelson | |
| 1964 | Your Cheatin' Heart | Gene Nelson | Second collaboration with Gene Nelson | |
| 1964 | Get Yourself a College Girl | Sidney Miller | | |
| 1965 | When the Boys Meet the Girls | Alvin Ganzer | | |
| 1965 | Harum Scarum | Gene Nelson | Third collaboration with Gene Nelson | |
| 1966 | Hold On! | Arthur Lubin | | |
| 1966 | Hot Rods to Hell | John Brahm | | |
| 1967 | Riot on Sunset Strip | Arthur Dreifuss | First collaboration with Arthur Dreifuss | |
| 1967 | The Fastest Guitar Alive | Michael D. Moore | | |
| 1967 | The Love-Ins | Arthur Dreifuss | Second collaboration with Arthur Dreifuss | |
| 1968 | For Singles Only | Arthur Dreifuss | Third collaboration with Arthur Dreifuss | |
| 1968 | A Time to Sing | Arthur Dreifuss | Fourth collaboration with Arthur Dreifuss | |
| 1968 | The Young Runaways | Arthur Dreifuss | Fifth collaboration with Arthur Dreifuss | |

Editorial department
| Year | Film | Director | Role | Notes |
|---|---|---|---|---|
| 1925 | Ben-Hur: A Tale of the Christ | Fred Niblo | Assistant editor | Uncredited |
| 1937 | The Good Earth | Sidney Franklin | Assistant editor | Uncredited |

TV pilots

Editor
| Year | Film | Director |
|---|---|---|
| 1966 | The Iron Men | Allen H. Miner |

TV series

Editor
| Year | Title | Notes |
|---|---|---|
| 1956 | MGM Parade | 6 episodes |
| 1961 | The Asphalt Jungle | 2 episodes |
| 1960−61 | National Velvet | 3 episodes |
| 1964 | Dr. Kildare | 1 episode |
| 1968 | Off to See the Wizard | 2 episodes |

TV specials

Editor
| Year | Title |
|---|---|
| 1967 | 39th Academy Awards |

== Bibliography ==
- Holston, Kim R. Movie Roadshows: A History and Filmography of Reserved-Seat Limited Showings, 1911–1973. McFarland, 2012.
