= An American in Buenos Aires =

1961 Argentine romantic comedy film

- Poster bearing the alternative Spanish-language title Los asesinos las prefieren rubias
- Directed by: George Cahan
- Written by: Antonio de Lara
- Produced by: Federico Aicardi
- Starring: Mamie Van Doren; Jean-Pierre Aumont
- Cinematography: Américo Hoss
- Edited by: Vicente Castagno
- Music by: Waldo de los Ríos
- Release date: July 6, 1961 (Argentina)
- Running time: 79 minutes
- Countries: Argentina; France
- Language: Spanish

An American in Buenos Aires (Spanish: Una Americana en Buenos Aires) is a 1961 Argentine film directed by George Cahan. The film was based on the story by Antonio de Lara. The film starred Mamie Van Doren and Jean-Pierre Aumont. It is also known by the alternative title The Blonde from Buenos Aires. In Spanish, it is also known by the title Los asesinos las prefieren rubias (literally: Killers Prefer Blondes).

The movie was Van Doren's last film for three years. She didn't return to the screen until 1964, playing the lead role in The Candidate.

== Premise ==
The escapades in Buenos Aires of a lively American tourist and her French boyfriend unfold against the backdrop of a suspected homicide.

== Cast ==
- Mamie Van Doren
- Jean-Pierre Aumont
- Carlos Estrada
- Catherine Zabó
- Juan Carlos Mareco
- Nathán Pinzón
- Guido Gorgatti
- Chela Ruíz
