= Jeanne Carmen =

American model, actress and trick-shot golfer (1930–2007)

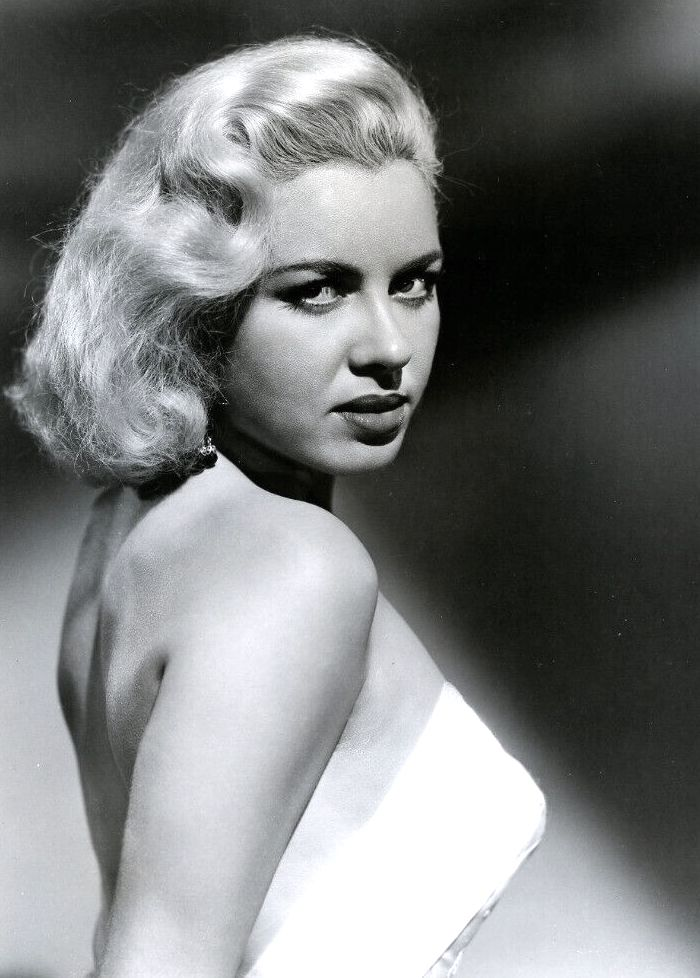
- Carmen in Portland Exposé (1957)
- Born: Agnes Laverne Carmen; August 4, 1930; Paragould, Arkansas, U.S.
- Died: December 20, 2007 (aged 77); Irvine, California, U.S.
- Resting place: Pacific View Memorial Park
- Other names: Queen of the B-Movies; Jeannie Carman; Saba Dareaux; Jeannie
- Occupations: Actress; Model; Pin-up girl; Trick-shot golfer
- Years active: 1946–2007
- Spouse(s): Sandy Scott (m. 1948; div. 1949) Ben Campo (1963–?)
- Children: Brandon James; Melinda Belli; Kellee Jade Campo
- Website: The Official Jeanne Carmen web site

Agnes Laverne Carmen, also known as Jeanne Carmen (August 4, 1930 – December 20, 2007), was an American model, actress, trick-shot golfer, and B-movie actress known for her appearances in low-budget films during the 1950s and 1960s. She also gained fame as a touring trick-shot golfer. Known for her platinum-blonde hair and hourglass figure, she was often dubbed the "Queen of the B-Movies". She was known for her friendships with Frank Sinatra, Elvis Presley, and Marilyn Monroe.

== Early life ==
Carmen was born Agnes Laverne Carmon in Paragould, Arkansas, on August 4, 1930 to Georgia Ellen Wright. Her family picked cotton for a living, and as a child, she also worked in the cotton fields. Unhappy with her home life, particularly disliking her stepfather, she ran away at age 13. At 16, she moved to New York City and, despite having no show business experience, secured a job as a dancer in the Broadway show Burlesque, which starred comedian Bert Lahr. She later found work as a successful pin-up and "cheesecake" model for men's magazines, appearing alongside other models like Bettie Page in publications such as Wink, Beauty Parade and Titter.

== Career ==
She was a trick-shot golfer, appearing with and managed by Jack Redmond. She also performed for President Dwight D. Eisenhower during this period. She toured country clubs and county fairs with Redmond and her then husband Sandy Scott. In her 20s, while on tour and traveling to Florida, she met Johnny Rosselli, the Chicago Outfit's liaison in Los Angeles, who drove her, without her husband, to Las Vegas. The pair, now intimate, stayed at the Desert Inn, where they scammed rich victims who bet unsuccessfully against her winning games on the casino's golf course. Rosselli introduced her to Frank Sinatra, who took her from Las Vegas to Hollywood.

Frank Sinatra encouraged her move to Hollywood, where she shifted her focus to acting. Her striking looks quickly landed her roles in numerous low-budget "B" movies, earning her the nickname "Queen of the B-Movies". Her roles often cast her as a femme fatale and spirited character.

In Hollywood, she appeared in B-movies such as Guns Don't Argue and The Monster of Piedras Blancas. She played both brassy platinum-blondes and (with her natural dark hair) sultry Spanish women. Carmen's good looks, hourglass figure, and green eyes quickly landed her on the big screen in 1956 playing a feisty Spanish senorita named Serelda in the film The Three Outlaws, a Western based on the same events as the later Butch Cassidy and the Sundance Kid, and co-starring Neville Brand and Alan Hale, Jr as Butch and Sundance. She was cast by producer/director Howard W. Koch as an Indian girl in War Drums with Lex Barker of Tarzan fame. Koch took a liking to Carmen and cast her in Untamed Youth (1957), his next film for Warner Bros, co-starring Rockabilly legend Eddie Cochran, which inspired Cochran to cover the song "Jeannie, Jeannie, Jeannie" for her.

Carmen also appeared as a femme fatale in Portland Exposé with Frank Gorshin. She also appeared in the Three Stooges short A Merry Mix Up, playing Joe Besser's girlfriend Mary. The short is notable for the Stooges playing three sets of identical triplets.

== Later years ==
In 1998, Carmen was the subject of a TV episode titled "Jeanne Carmen: Queen of the B-Movies" on the series E! True Hollywood Story. The show stated that Carmen maintained a "dangerously close friendship with Marilyn Monroe and The Kennedys" and that after the death of Monroe, Carmen was told to leave town by John Roselli who was working for Chicago Mob Boss Sam Giancana. Believing her life was in danger, she fled to Scottsdale, Arizona, where she lived incognito for more than a decade. Carmen abandoned her platinum-blonde locks, had three children, and lived a quiet life, never mentioning her prior life in Hollywood.

Carmen re-emerged in the late 1980s and became a frequent interviewee for television documentaries and nostalgia conventions, often sharing anecdotes about the Golden Age of Hollywood. Her life was profiled in a 1998 episode of the E! True Hollywood Story. She made a final film appearance as Mrs. Lipschitz in the 2005 comedic horror film The Naked Monster, an homage to drive-in movies.

Carmen's last published interview was on November 21, 2007 by SX News, an Australian weekly gay and lesbian newspaper.

== Personal life ==
Carmen's personal life was the subject of many news and media particularly her affairs with high-profile celebrities including Frank Sinatra, Elvis Presley, Clark Gable, and Errol Flynn. Jeanne's friendship with Marilyn Monroe.

In the 1950s, Jeanne dated Conrad Hilton Jr. socialite, hotel heir, and businessman. He was the eldest son of Hilton Hotels founder Conrad Hilton but they broke up due to his drinking, heroin addiction, and abusive behavior.

She was married twice. Her first marriage was to aspiring operatic singer Sandy Scott in 1948; they divorced a year later. In 1968, she married stockbroker Ben Campo, and the couple had three children: a son, Brandon James, and two daughters, Melinda Belli and Kellee Jade Campo. Carmen moved to Orange County, California, in 1978, where she resided for the rest of her life.

Carmen re-emerged into public life in the late 1980s. In 1998, her life story was featured on an episode of the E! True Hollywood Story. Her autobiography, Jeanne Carmen: My Wild, Wild Life as a New York Pin Up Queen, Trick Shot Golfer & Hollywood Actress, was published in 2006.

== Death ==
On December 20, 2007, aged 77, Jeanne Carmen died from lymphoma at her home in Irvine, California, where she had resided since 1978. She was survived by three children, Melinda, Kellee Jade, and Brandon, and three grandchildren.

At the time of Carmen's death, a biographical film of her life was in early stages of development, with Christina Aguilera, Scarlett Johansson, and Kate Bosworth under consideration to play Carmen.

== Filmography ==
=== Television series ===
Year	Title	Role	Notes
1951	Mike and Buff	Princess Jeanne	Episode: "Princess Jeanne"
1958	The Millionaire	Mary Evans	Episode: "The Wally Bannister Story"
1958	26 Men	Lili Mae Turner	Episode: "The Last Rebellion"
1959	Riverboat	Janine - Blonde Girl in Stagecoach	Episode: "A Night at Trapper's Landing"
1959	Have Gun – Will Travel	Paladin's Love Interest / Blonde Glamour Girl	Episode: "Tiger"
1960	Tightrope!	Francie Verlaine	Episode: "The Chinese Pendant"
1961	The Dick Powell Show	Nikki	Episode: "Three Soldiers"

=== Film ===
Year	Title	Role	Notes
1953	Striporama	Venus Beauty	Uncredited
1953	Here Come the Girls	Missouri Chorine	
1956	The Three Outlaws	Serelda	
1957	Guns Don't Argue	Paula	
1957	War Drums	Yellow Moon	
1957	A Merry Mix Up	Mary	
1957	Untamed Youth	Lillibet	
1957	Portland Exposé	Iris	
1958	I Married a Woman	Camera Girl	Uncredited
1958	Too Much, Too Soon	Tassles	Uncredited
1958	Born Reckless	Rodeo Girl	
1959	The Monster of Piedras Blancas	Lucille Sturges	
1962	The Devil's Hand	The Blonde Cultist	Credited as Jeannie Carman
1962	House of Women	Inmate	
2003	House of 1000 Corpses	Miss Bunny	Her role was cut from the final finished film
2005	The Naked Monster	Mrs. Lipschitz	

=== Music video ===
Year	Song	Role	Singer	Notes
1998	Outside	Blonde Dominatrix	George Michael	
