= The Tough and the Mighty =

- Italian film poster
- Directed by: Carlo Lizzani
- Screenplay by: Dino Maiuri; Massimo De Rita; Augusto Caminito; Antonio Troiso; Carlo Lizzani
- Dialogue by: Giuseppe Fiori
- Story by: Dino Maiuri; Massimo De Rita
- Based on: La società del malessere by Giuseppe Fiori
- Produced by: Dino De Laurentiis
- Starring: Terence Hill; Don Backy; Frank Wolff; Gabriele Tinti; Helena Ronee; Rossana Krisman
- Cinematography: Nino Cristiani
- Edited by: Franco Fraticelli
- Music by: Don Backy
- Production company: Dino De Laurentiis Cinematografica
- Distributed by: Paramount Pictures
- Release date: 1969
- Running time: 83 minutes
- Country: Italy
- Language: Italian

The Tough and the Mighty (Italian: Barbagia (La società del malessere)) is a 1969 Italian drama film directed by Carlo Lizzani. It is based on the real-life events of Italian bandit Graziano Mesina.

== Cast ==
- Terence Hill: Graziano Cassitta
- Don Backy: Miguel Lopez
- Frank Wolff: Spina
- Peter Martell: Antonio Masara
- Clelia Matania: La madre di Graziano
- Ezio Sancrotti: Nino Benedetto
- Tano Cimarosa: Cartana
- Attilio Dottesio: Il padre di Nino
- Gabriele Tinti: Nanni Ripari
- Rossana Martini: Signora Benedetto
- Helene Ronee: Anania
- Franco Silva: Avvocato Arecu
- Rosalba Neri: Girl at Party
