= Rossana Martini =

Italian actress, model, and beauty pageant titleholder (1926–1988)

Rossana Martini (1 January 1926 – 2 February 1988) was an Italian actress, model and beauty pageant titleholder.

Born in Empoli, Italy, at 20 Martini won the first edition of the Miss Italia beauty contest held in 1946, raising a great controversy by the tabloid press for the non-election of Silvana Pampanini. She subsequently started a career as an actress, sometimes starring leading roles. She was married to the actor and producer Nino Crisman.

== Filmography ==
Year	Title	Role	Notes
1948	I contrabbandieri del mare	Laura	
1949	Se fossi deputato	Valeria	
1951	The Seven Dwarfs to the Rescue	The Handmaiden of Darkness	
1953	At the Edge of the City	Elena	
1958	The Beautiful Legs of Sabrina	Toni	
1959	Vacations in Majorca	Angela Esteban	
1960	Il carro armato dell'8 settembre	Angelina	
1964	La vita agra	Mara - wife of Luciano	
1965	Thrilling	Carmela (segment "L'autostrada del sole")	Uncredited
1966	El Greco	Zaida	
1967	Requiescant	Lope	
1967	Don Juan in Sicily		
1969	The Tough and the Mighty	Nino's Wife	(final film role)
