= The Big Operator (1959 film) =

1959 film

- Directed by: Charles F. Haas
- Screenplay by: Paul Gallico; Allen Rivkin; Robert Smith
- Based on: The Adventures of Joe Smith, American; 1940 story in Hearst's International Cosmopolitan by Paul Gallico
- Produced by: Albert Zugsmith; Red Doff
- Starring: Mickey Rooney; Steve Cochran; Mamie Van Doren; Ray Danton; Mel Tormé
- Cinematography: Walter Castle
- Edited by: Ben Lewis
- Music by: Van Alexander
- Production companies: Albert Zugsmith Productions; Fryman Productions
- Distributed by: Metro-Goldwyn-Mayer
- Release date: August 1959
- Running time: 90 minutes
- Country: United States
- Language: English
- Budget: $527,000
- Box office: $680,000

The Big Operator (a.k.a. Anatomy of the Syndicate) is a black and white 1959 American crime/drama film starring Mickey Rooney as a corrupt union boss, with Steve Cochran, Mel Torme and Mamie Van Doren as co-stars. The film is a remake of Joe Smith, American (1942) with labor union thugs replacing Axis spies.

== Plot ==
Ruthless union leader "Little Joe" Braun is due to face questioning from a Senate committee. On the night preceding the inquiry, he sends a hit man, Oscar "The Executioner" Wetzel, to kill a witness named Tragg and steal incriminating documents in Tragg's possession at a factory.

The union has two very different factions, and one group are surprised to find the other on strike when they arrive at work. Demanding a meeting with Braun it is clear that unless they toe the line they are out. McAfee is thrown out of the union allegedly because his dues are not up to date.

Factory workers and friends Bill Gibson and Fred McAfee are accidental eyewitnesses to Wetzel meeting with Braun shortly after the crime. Braun pleads the Fifth Amendment during his Senate testimony and vehemently denies knowing the mob enforcer Wetzel. But with a perjury charge facing him, Braun realizes that Gibson and McAfee could potentially put him behind bars. The two men have attached no importance to the meet. It is only when Braun offers them high-paying no-show jobs out of the blue that their suspicions are aroused.

A campaign of intimidation against the two men begins. They are harassed at work and then fired on false grounds. McAfee is set afire and nearly dies from the burns. Gibson and wife Mary panic after their son Timmy is taken captive.

Gibson, who had been blindfolded in Braun's car, recreates and retraces with great difficulty the way to a hideout where Timmy is being held. After fighting and subduing Wetzel and his accomplices, Gibson and the authorities can't find Braun or the boy and are about to give up when they spot Braun's cigar, still burning in an ashtray. They find him cowering in a closet with the boy, then drag him away to jail.

== Cast ==
- Mickey Rooney as Little Joe Braun
- Steve Cochran as Bill Gibson
- Mamie Van Doren as Mary Gibson
- Ray Danton as Oscar 'The Executioner' Wetzel
- Mel Tormé as Fred McAfee
- Ray Anthony as Slim Clayburn
- Jim Backus as Cliff Heldon
- Jackie Coogan as Ed Brannell
- Joey Forman as Ray Bailey
- Charles Chaplin, Jr. as Bill Tragg
- Vampira as Gina
- Jay North as Timmy Gibson
- Leo Gordon as Danny Sacanzi
- Billy Daniels as Tony Wetson, Gas Station Attendant
- Norman Grabowski as Lou Green
- Ziva Rodann as Alice Mc Afee
- Gary Hunley as Skip Mc Afee, Timmy's friend (uncredited)

== Box office ==
The film earned $330,000 in the US and Canada and $350,000 elsewhere, resulting in a loss of $253,000.

== See also ==
- List of American films of 1959
