= The Arizona Kid (1970 film) =

1970 film

- Directed by: Luciano B. Carlos
- Produced by: Cirio H. Santiago
- Starring: Chiquito; Gordon Mitchell; Mamie Van Doren
- Cinematography: Felipe Sacdalan
- Edited by: Ben Barcelon
- Music by: Restie Umali
- Release date: September 5, 1970 (Philippines)
- Running time: 110 minutes
- Country: Philippines
- Language: English

The Arizona Kid is a 1970 Philippine comedy western directed by Luciano B. Carlos and starring Chiquito, Gordon Mitchell, and Mamie Van Doren.

== Cast ==
- Chiquito as Ambo The Arizona Kid
- Gordon Mitchell as "Coyote"
- Mamie Van Doren as Sharon Miller
- Mariela Branger as Pamela
- Bernard Bonnin as Leonardo
- Dan van Husen as Billy, the first outlaw leader
- Víctor Israel as Frank, the second outlaw leader
- Pilar Velázquez
- Angel Aranda
- Tony Brandt
- John Mark
