= Ain't Misbehavin' (film) =

1955 film by Edward Buzzell

- Film poster by Reynold Brown
- Directed by: Edward Buzzell
- Written by: Robert Carson; Devery Freeman; Philip Rapp; Edward Buzzell
- Produced by: Samuel Marx
- Starring: Rory Calhoun; Piper Laurie; Jack Carson; Mamie Van Doren
- Cinematography: Wilfred M. Cline
- Edited by: Paul Weatherwax
- Music by: Joseph Gershenson
- Production company: Universal-International
- Distributed by: Universal Pictures
- Release date: July 1, 1955 (New York City)
- Running time: 82 minutes
- Country: United States
- Language: English
- Box office: $1 million (US)

Ain't Misbehavin' is a 1955 musical film released by Universal-International and starring Rory Calhoun, Piper Laurie, Jack Carson and Mamie Van Doren.

== Plot ==
Sarah Hatfield, a young, ambitious nightclub dancer, falls in love with and marries Kenneth Post, the millionaire of her dreams. As she tries to change herself to fit in with the ladies of high society, her husband suspects she is "misbehaving" with lecturer Piermont Rogers. So they divorce and Sarah moves to a remote country lodge. Kenneth meets her there and another argument ensues. Later, however, Sarah overhears Kenneth discussing with Piermont his love for Sarah just the way she is. She sneaks back to her old nightclub, leaving instructions for the lodge master to tell Kenneth where she is. At the club, they get back together and fall in love all over again.

== Cast ==
- Rory Calhoun as Kenneth Post
- Piper Laurie as Sarah Bernhardt Hatfield
- Jack Carson as Hal North
- Mamie Van Doren as Jackie
- Reginald Gardiner as Anatole Piermont Rogers
- Barbara Britton as Pat Beaton
- Dani Crayne as Millie

== See also ==
- List of American films of 1955
