= Charles F. Haas =

American television director

- Born: Charles Friedman Haas; November 15, 1913; Chicago, Illinois, U.S.
- Died: May 12, 2011 (aged 97)
- Education: Harvard University (BS)
- Occupation: Director

Charles Friedman Haas (November 15, 1913 – May 12, 2011) was an American film and television director.

== Biography ==
Haas was born in Chicago, Illinois and graduated from Harvard University. In 1935, he began his career at Universal Studios - where his stepfather was friends with studio chief Carl Laemmle - starting as an extra and eventually becoming assistant director and later a director of non-dramatic films. During World War II, he directed films for the Army Signal Corps. He turned to television in the 1950s, and during this period had a brief stint directing low-budget films. Ultimately, however, he settled in television, directing episodes of such popular series as Bonanza, The Alfred Hitchcock Hour, The Outer Limits, and The Man from U.N.C.L.E.

In 1952 he sued Walter Wanger for $53,000.

== Credits ==
- Her Adventurous Night (1946) - producer
- Moonrise (1948) - writer, producer
- Dick Tracy (1951) (TV series) - director
- Big Town (1952–53) (TV series) - director
- Chevron Theatre (1953) (TV series) - director
- Lux Video Theatre (1953) (TV series) - director
- Mystery Is My Business (1954) (TV series) - director
- The Shadow (1954) (short) - director
- The Whistler (1954–55) (TV series) - director
- Paris Precinct (1955) (TV series) - director
- The Mickey Mouse Club (1955) (TV series) - director
- The Millionaire (1955–57) (TV series) - director
- Star in the Dust (1956) - director
- Screaming Eagles (1956) - director
- The Hardy Boys: The Mystery of the Applegate Treasure (1956) - director
- Showdown at Abilene (1956) - director
- Zane Grey Theatre (1957) (TV series) - director
- The New Adventures of Charlie Chan (1957) (TV series) - director
- Man Without a Gun (1957–58) (TV series) - director
- Broken Arrow (1958) (TV series) - director
- Summer Love (1958) - director
- Wild Heritage (1958) - director
- The Beat Generation (1959) - director
- The Big Operator (1959) - director
- The Alaskans (1959) (TV series) -director
- Girls Town (1959) - director
- Death Valley Days (1959) (TV series) - director
- Men Into Space (1959) (TV series) - director
- 77 Sunset Strip (1959–60) (TV series) - director
- Hawaiian Eye (1959–60) (TV series) - director
- Tarzan and the Trappers (1960) - director
- Platinum High School (1960) - director
- Perry Mason (1960) (TV series) - director
- Hong Kong (1960) (TV series) - director
- Bonanza (1960) (TV series) - director
- The Law and Mr. Jones (1960) (TV series) - director
- Surfside 6 (1960) (TV series) - director
- The Roaring 20's (1960–61) (TV series) - director
- The Islanders (1960–61) (TV series) - director
- Maverick (1961) (TV series) - director
- Route 66 (1961) (TV series) - director
- Adventures in Paradise (1961-62) (TV series) - director
- Leave It to Beaver (1961–63) (TV series) - director
- The Detectives (1962) (TV series) - director
- Frontier Circus (1962) (TV series) - director
- Wagon Train (1962) (TV series) - director
- General Electric Theater (1962) (TV series) -director
- The Dick Powell Theatre (1962) (TV series) - director
- The Alfred Hitchcock Hour (1962) (TV series) - director
- Burke's Law (1963) (TV series) - director
- The Travels of Jaimie McPheeters (1964) (TV series) - director
- Summer Playhouse (1964) (TV series) - director
- The Outer Limits (1964–65) (TV series) - director
- Rawhide (1965) (TV series) - director
- The Man from U.N.C.L.E. (1967) (TV series) - director
