= All American (film) =

1953 film

The All American
- Lobby card
- Directed by: Jesse Hibbs
- Written by: Robert Libott (adaptation)
- Screenplay by: D.D. Beauchamp
- Story by: Leonard Freeman
- Produced by: Aaron Rosenberg
- Starring: Tony Curtis; Lori Nelson
- Cinematography: Maury Gertsman
- Edited by: Edward Curtiss
- Music by: Joseph Gershenson
- Production company: Universal International Pictures
- Distributed by: Universal Pictures
- Release date: October 1953
- Running time: 83 minutes
- Country: United States
- Language: English

All American is a 1953 American drama sports film directed by Jesse Hibbs and starring Tony Curtis and Lori Nelson.

== Plot ==
A star quarterback, Nick Bonelli is not told by his coach until after winning a game that his parents have been killed in a car crash on their way to the stadium. Angered by the coach's insensitivity, Nick quits the team and the school.

He decides to study architecture at a Chicago university called Sheridan but refuses to play football. A professor warns him that things are different at this school and that Nick will need to conform, including getting a shorter haircut. He makes only one friend, Howard Carter, and is soon subjected to hazing and insults from other students, including a fraternity that rejects him.

A seductive waitress, Susie Ward, causes a fight that leads to a rift between Nick and Howard, and the latter being placed on academic probation. The architecture professor's secretary, Sharon Wallace, takes an interest in Nick and his troubles at school.

Susie, who is candid about wanting to marry a rich Sheridan man someday, persuades Nick to join the football team. "We Want Nick" chants from the spectators precede his finally getting into a game, which Nick promptly wins with a touchdown. With a new haircut and new popularity, he is invited to join the frat.

A drunken Howard is tricked by Susie into proposing marriage. When she learns from Nick that Howard is trouble at the school, she angrily hits Nick with a bottle. He is arrested, disgraced and thrown off the team.

Nick watches the next game from a bar. Susie has a guilty conscience, however, and explains what happened. Nick is reinstated and rushes to the stadium by halftime. His play wins the game, and Sharon realizes that she is in love with him.

== Cast ==
- Tony Curtis as Nick Bonelli
- Lori Nelson as Sharon Wallace
- Richard Long as Howard Carter
- Mamie Van Doren as Susie Ward
- Gregg Palmer as Hunt Cameron
- Paul Cavanagh as Professor Banning
- Barney Phillips as Clipper Colton
- Jimmy Hunt as Whizzer
- Stuart Whitman as Zip Parker
- Douglas Kennedy as Tate Hardy
- Donald Randolph as David Carter
- Herman Hickman as Jumbo
- Frank Gifford as Stan Pomeroy
- Tom Harmon as himself
- Jim Sears as Dartmore Quarterback
- Elmer Willhoite as Kenton
- Donn Moomaw as Jonas

== See also ==
- List of American football films
