= Untamed Youth =

1957 film by Howard W. Koch

- Theatrical release poster
- Directed by: Howard W. Koch
- Written by: John C. Higgins; Stephen Longstreet
- Produced by: Aubrey Schenck
- Starring: Mamie Van Doren; Lori Nelson; John Russell; Eddie Cochran
- Cinematography: Carl E. Guthrie
- Edited by: John F. Schreyer
- Music by: Les Baxter
- Distributed by: Warner Bros. Pictures
- Release dates: May 8, 1957 (Wilkes-Barre, Pennsylvania); May 10, 1957 (New York)
- Running time: 80 minutes
- Country: United States
- Language: English

Untamed Youth is a 1957 American teen film directed by Howard W. Koch, written by John C. Higgins and Stephen Longstreet and starring Mamie Van Doren and Lori Nelson as starstruck sisters who are sentenced to farm labor.

Eddie Cochran acts in the film and sings the song "Cotton Picker". The music was composed by Les Baxter.

== Plot ==
Sisters Penny and Jane Lowe, on their way to Los Angeles, are arrested for hitchhiking and skinny-dipping and are sentenced to work on a rural Texas farm for corrupt agricultural magnate Russ Tropp. Cecilia Steele, the female judge who sentenced the sisters, is secretly married to Tropp. When Steele's son Bob is hired to work at the farm, he discovers that Tropp has used his relationship with Cecilia to ensure that all convicts serve their sentence at his farm, therefore affording him a stable amount of cheap labor and allowing him to undercut his competition. Bob falls in love with Jane, while Penny dreams of showbiz stardom. Bob rushes another girl, Baby, to the hospital, where she dies from internal hemorrhaging caused by a miscarriage.

Bob confronts his mother, who reveals that she married Tropp and is unaware of the abuses on the farm. She takes Jane along to investigate further while Bob and Penny, with the help of Spanish-speaking worker Margarita, learn that Tropp is looking to hire illegal migrant workers for the ranch. Margarita and Bob are spotted and chased by Tropp's guard dogs before being captured. Tropp orders them to be sent across the border with the smugglers to keep them from informing federal authorities. Penny rallies the farm workers to confront Tropp before they can leave. After someone throws an object at the sheriff, a riot is averted as Jane and Cecilia return. The sheriff's deputy attempts to drive away, but Bob, despite being under arrest, causes the car to crash into a pole. Bob captures the coyote with whom Tropp spoke and informs the crowd about the smuggling plan. After Tropp is searched and phony work permits are found on him, Cecilia orders both men into custody. She tells the crowd that she will seek to commute their sentences before retiring.

Some time later, Jane, Bob and Cecilia watch Penny performing a calypso number on television.

== Cast ==
- Mamie Van Doren as Penny Lowe
- Lori Nelson as Jane Lowe
- John Russell as Russ Tropp
- Don Burnett as Bob Steele
- Glenn Dixon as Jack Landis
- Lurene Tuttle as Judge Cecilia Steele Tropp
- Eddie Cochran as Bong
- Yvonne Fedderson as Baby
- Jeanne Carmen as Lillibet
- Robert Foulk as Sheriff Mitch Bowers
- Wayne Taylor as Duke
- Jered Barclay as Ralph
- Valerie Reynolds as Arkie
- Lucita as Margaritia
- Matt Malinowski as Hair

== Soundtrack ==
Music from the film performed by Mamie Van Doren was released as an extended play record on the Prep label. Eddie Cochran and Jerry Capehart cowrote one of the film's songs, "Oo Ba La Baby". The three other songs on the record are "Salamander", "Rollin' Stone" and "Go, Go, Calypso!" Les Baxter wrote the film's score.

== Reception ==
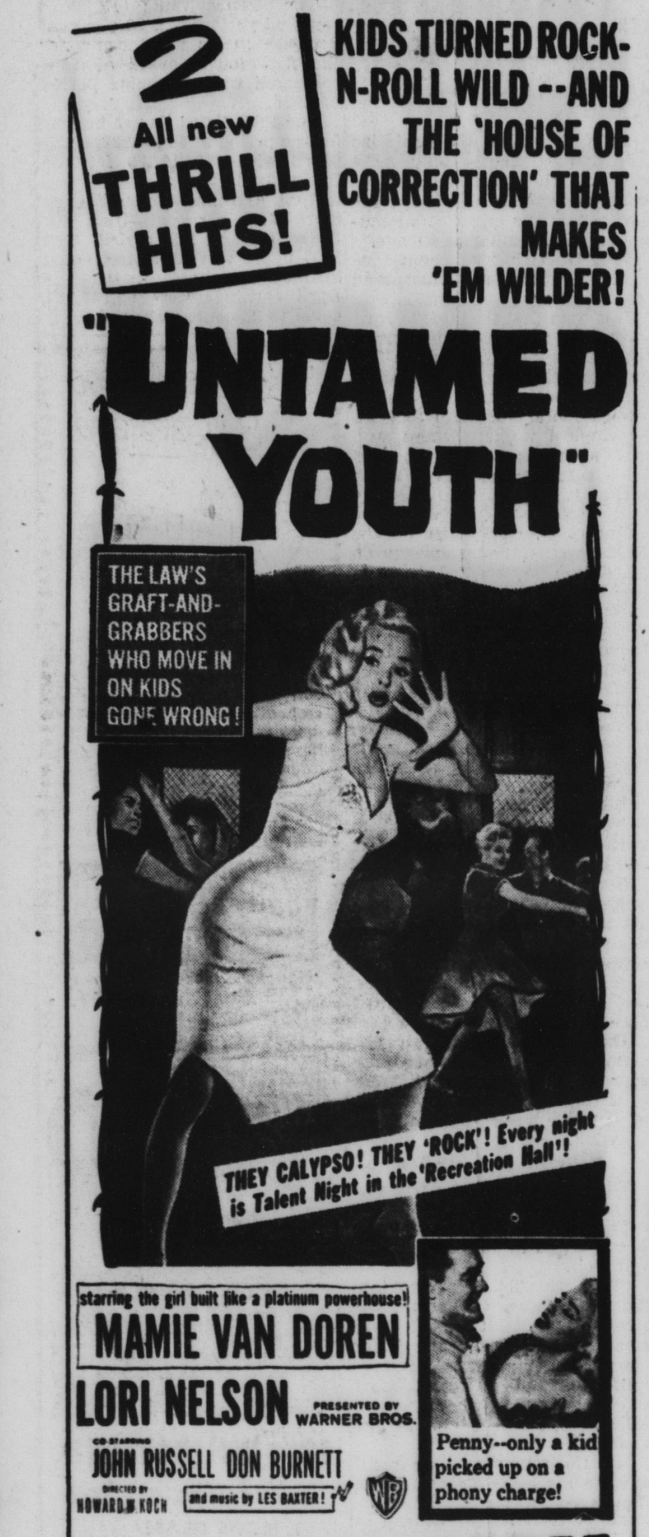
Advertisement from 1957

The film premiered in Wilkes-Barre, Pennsylvania on May 8, 1957.

In a contemporary review for The New York Times, critic A. H. Weiler called Untamed Youth "a mélange of mediocre melodrama" and wrote: "Call it a fate almost worse than death—for one viewer, at least. ... Miss Van Doren renders such exotic numbers as 'Oobala Baby,' 'Salamander' and 'Cotton Picker' to a variety of torrid gyrations that are guaranteed to keep any red-blooded American boy awake. Nothing else in this picture can make that claim."

== Legacy ==
The film has acquired a cult following. It has been described as "a camp classic, so stupefyingly awful that it's actually festive" by critic Hal Erickson of AllMovie, who also noted that "to repeat examples of the film's howlingly bad dialogue would be to rob the viewer of the perverse pleasure of experiencing Untamed Youth in all its trashy glory."

=== Mystery Science Theater 3000 ===
The film was featured in episode #112 of Mystery Science Theater 3000, premiering on the Comedy Channel on January 27, 1990. In his recap of the episode, Kevin Murphy notes the movie's exploitative nature, writing, "No opportunity to show [Mamie Van Doren] in her underwear is wasted." Murphy also claims Untamed Youth garnered MST3K its first negative review. The magazine Gorezone panned the series and "complain[ed] about the fact that [the MST3K performers] talked over Eddie Cochran's only song." According to writer / performers Trace Beaulieu and Josh Weinstein, writing the episode drove the staff to get "a little hammered" on tequila and beer.

As he did with all of the first-season episodes—the best first-season episode in his rankings is Project Moonbase, ranked #170—writer Jim Vorel ranked the episode low, placing it at #179 out of 197 episodes from the twelve seasons. The ranking is a product of the unpolished first-season riffing, as Vorel calls Untamed Youth "fairly harmless", with Mamie Van Doren "at the height of her considerable powers." However, he also noted Van Doren's "profoundly off-key" vocals.

Shout Factory released the episode on DVD as part of its Volume XXIX box set. The Untamed Youth disc included an interview with Mamie Van Doren as a bonus feature. The set, released on March 25, 2014, included three other episodes: The Pumaman (#903), Hercules and the Captive Women (#412), and The Thing That Couldn't Die (#805).

Untamed Youth was updated for MST3K in a 2021 livestream version during Joel Hodgson's Make More MST3K campaign on Kickstarter.
