= High School Confidential! (film) =

1958 film by Jack Arnold

- Directed by: Jack Arnold
- Written by: Robert Blees; Lewis Meltzer
- Produced by: Albert Zugsmith
- Starring: Russ Tamblyn; Jan Sterling; John Drew Barrymore; Mamie Van Doren; Jerry Lee Lewis; Ray Anthony; Jackie Coogan; Charles Chaplin Jr. Diane Jergens
- Cinematography: Harold J. Marzorati
- Edited by: Ben Lewis
- Music by: Albert Glasser
- Distributed by: Metro-Goldwyn-Mayer
- Release date: 29 May 1958
- Running time: 84 minutes
- Country: United States
- Language: English
- Budget: $532,000
- Box office: $1,915,000

High School Confidential! is a 1958 American crime drama film directed by Jack Arnold, starring Mamie Van Doren, Russ Tamblyn, Jan Sterling, John Drew Barrymore, Jackie Coogan, Diane Jergens and Michael Landon.

The film also features a cameo by Jerry Lee Lewis who opens the movie singing "High School Confidential" which Lewis co-wrote with Ron Hargrave. Lewis released the title track as a Sun Records 45 single which became a Top 40 hit, reaching #21 in the Billboard charts.

The film is listed in Golden Raspberry Award founder John Wilson's book The Official Razzie Movie Guide as one of The 100 Most Enjoyably Bad Movies Ever Made.

== Plot ==
Mike Wilson, a young police officer, poses as a student under the alias Tony Baker and thus infiltrates a high school in order to investigate a narcotics ring. He lives in an apartment with Gwen Dulaine, a married woman who pretends to be his aunt in public but attempts to seduce him in private.

"Tony" flirts with pupil Joan Staples and incurs the wrath of teacher Arlene Williams as he makes acquaintances in school. He discovers that Joan uses marijuana and inquires about where she purchases it. He ultimately learns that a mysterious man known only as "Mr. A" is the one who sells drugs to the students, helped by an assistant called Bix.

With help from an undercover cop, Quinn, who risks his life to save Mike's, the criminals are apprehended and Joan promises Mike that her drug use is over.

== Cast ==
- Russ Tamblyn as Tony Baker/Mike Wilson
- Jan Sterling as Arlene Williams
- John Drew Barrymore as J. I. Coleridge
- Diane Jergens as Joan Staples
- Mamie Van Doren as Gwen Dulaine
- Jerry Lee Lewis as Himself
- Ray Anthony as Bix
- Jackie Coogan as Mr. 'Mr. A' August
- Charles Chaplin Jr. as Quinn
- Michael Landon as Steve Bentley
- Lyle Talbot as William Remington Kane
- Robin Raymond as Kitty
- Burt Douglas as Jukey Judlow

Veteran character actor Charles Halton appears uncredited in his last role as Mr. Robinson, the high school principal.

== Production ==
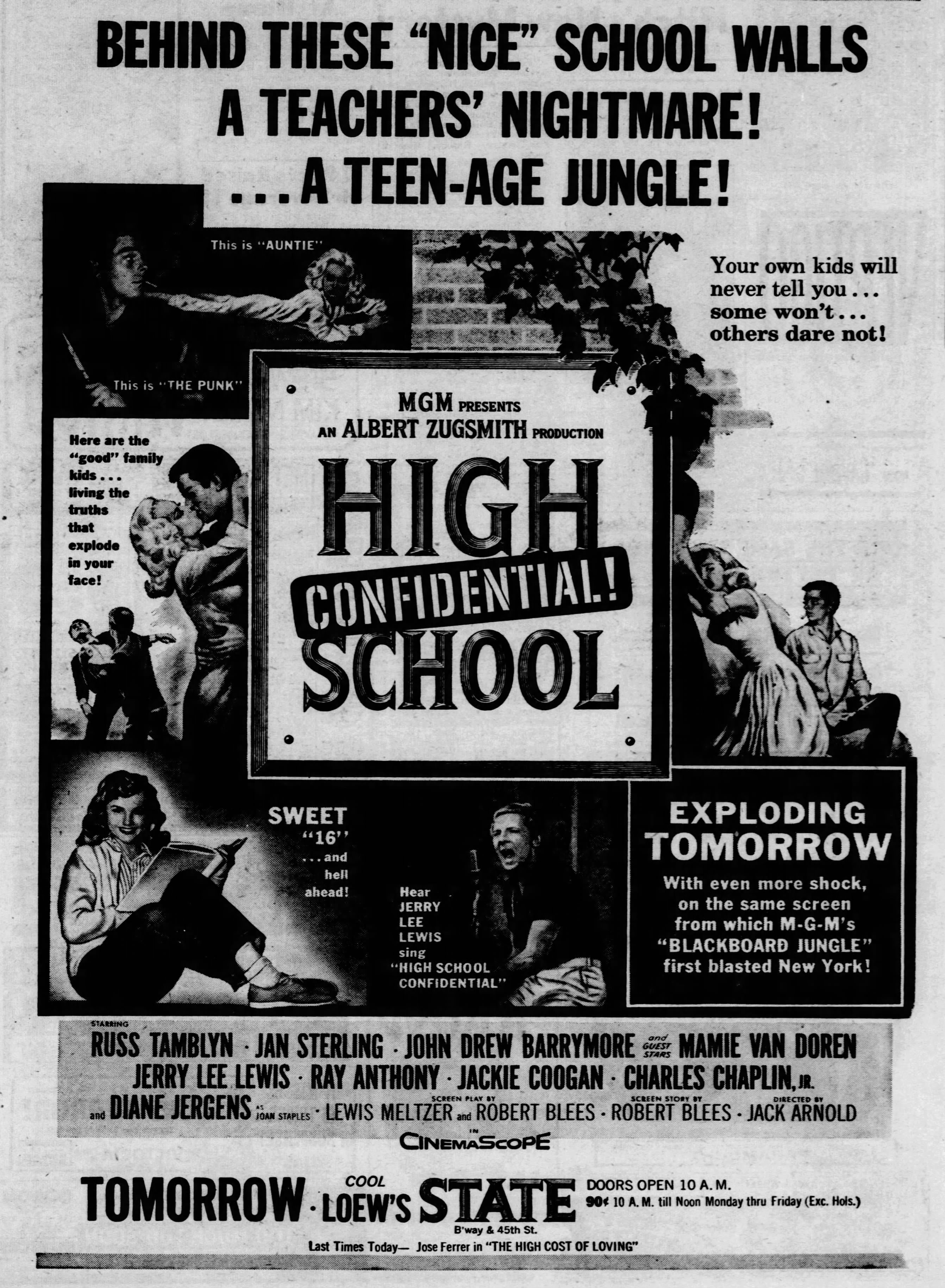
Theatrical advertisement from 1958

The movie was produced by Albert Zugsmith, the first of a six-picture deal he had signed with Metro-Goldwyn-Mayer. MGM would receive 75% of the profits, Zugmsith 25%.

In January 1958, Russ Tamblyn, who had just made the movie Tom Thumb (1958), was assigned to star. Filming began in February 1958.

George Raft had been cast in a role in the film but in March 1958, MGM announced Jackie Coogan would be playing the part instead. No explanation was given.

The film was based on an original script by Lewis Meltzer and screen story by Robert Blees. and according to critic Dana M. Reemes “utterly preposterous from beginning to end.”

High School Confidential! was conceived by Zugsmith, Meltzer and Blees and as a teenage exploitation film with an anti-marijuana message. Director Jack Arnold recalls an exchanges with producer Zugsmith regarding the film’s style and theme:

Zugsmith wanted an out-and-out exploitation picture, a straight, preachy, [anti-drug] message film—and if I could put nudity into it that would be great! I got along very well with Zugsmith. I just didn’t agree with him on everything, but he didn’t insist, which was a pleasure. If he didn’t like what I did I would just say, “Well, I like it,” and he’d leave me alone.

== Box office ==
According to MGM records the film earned $1,290,000 in the US and Canada and $625,000 elsewhere, resulting in a profit of $578,000. However, the follow-up films Zugsmith made for MGM, including The Beat Generation and Platinum High School, lost money.

== In popular culture ==
"High School Confidential! is deliberately and stylishly ludicrous, lampooning the anti-marijuana ideologies while glamorizing the erstwhile dopers. This latter aspect did not escape the federal narcotics people who sensed that the film was a dope, rock-and-roll, sex, and fast-car escapist fantasy for teens." —Biographer Dana M. Reemes in Directed by Jack Arnold (1988)

This film is sampled on White Zombie's album La Sexorcisto: Devil Music, Vol. 1 on four occasions: the "Do you want to start a rumble?" conversation, the "Drop it, buster!" line, the "tomorrow's a drag" poem, and the Columbus speech ("the only thing square about this world...").

In the 1980 song "High School Confidential" by the Canadian new wave band Rough Trade (album: Avoid Freud), singer Carole Pope refers to the star of this film, Mamie Van Doren.

The film notably features a nihilistic beat style poem titled "High School Drag" performed by cast member Phillipa Fallon. It was released as a single in 1958 as the B-side to “Christopher Columbus Digs the Jive", performed by John Drew Barrymore in the film. Cashbox magazine reviewed the single, and called it an "unusual affair that could make it." A contemporary reviewer for the film noted that Barrymore's "story of Columbus in jive talk" and Fallon's "shivery existentialist poem" were standout scenes in the movie.

== See also ==
- List of American films of 1958
- List of cult films
- List of drug films
- List of hood films

== Sources ==
- Reemes, Dana M. 1988. Directed by Jack Arnold. McFarland & Company, Jefferson, North Carolina 1988. ISBN 978-0899503318
