= You've Got to Be Smart =

- Directed by: Ellis Kadison
- Written by: Ellis Kadison
- Produced by: Ellis Kadison
- Starring: Tom Stern; Roger Perry; Gloria Castillo; Mamie Van Doren; Preston Foster
- Cinematography: Harry J. May
- Edited by: A.J. Cornall
- Music by: Gerald Alters; Stan Worth
- Release date: April 28, 1967
- Running time: 88 minutes
- Country: United States
- Language: English

You've Got to Be Smart (alternatively titled: The Smart Ones) is a 1967 American low-budgeted drama film directed, written and produced by Ellis Kadison, starring Tom Stern, Roger Perry, Gloria Castillo, and Mamie Van Doren. The film was released in few theaters in 1967.

== Plot summary ==
A con man finds a singing teenage preacher in a small town in Arkansas, and brings him to Los Angeles, where he sets him up with his own show, and waits for the money to come pouring in.

== Cast ==
- Tom Stern as Nick Sloane
- Roger Perry as Jery Harper
- Gloria Castillo as Connie Jackson
- Mamie Van Doren as Miss Hathaway
- Preston Foster as D.A. Griggs
- Jeff Bantam as Methusaleh Jones
- Mike Bantam as Methusaleh's brother
- Fritz Bantam as Methusaleh's brother
