= Star in the Dust =

1956 film by Charles F. Haas

- Theatrical release poster
- Directed by: Charles F. Haas
- Screenplay by: Oscar Brodney
- Based on: Law Man; 1953 novel by Lee Leighton
- Produced by: Albert Zugsmith
- Starring: John Agar; Mamie Van Doren; Richard Boone
- Cinematography: John L. Russell
- Edited by: Ray Snyder
- Music by: Frank Skinner
- Color process: Technicolor
- Production company: Universal Pictures
- Distributed by: Universal Pictures
- Release dates: May 2, 1956 (Los Angeles); June 13, 1956 (United States)
- Running time: 80 minutes
- Country: United States
- Language: English

Star in the Dust is a 1956 American Technicolor Western film directed by Charles F. Haas and starring John Agar, Mamie Van Doren and Richard Boone. It was based on the 1953 Lee Leighton novel Law Man.

In the town of Gunlock, sheriff Bill Jorden is due to hang Sam Hall for cattle-stealing. Jorden has to contend, however, with various citizens, including the cowboys who want to rescue Hall and the cattlemen and farmers who want to lynch him. Hall, meanwhile, is planning his escape with girlfriend Nellie.

== Plot ==
In the late 1800s in the western town of Gunlock, gunslinger Sam Hall, who has murdered three farmers, is scheduled to be hanged at sundown. Sheriff Bill Jorden faces opposition from the cattlemen's association, who had hired Hall to kill the farmers as part of a plot to acquire more grazing land. A group of farmers, fearing that the cattlemen will spring the killer before he is hanged, want the sheriff to hang Hall as quickly as possible. Fearing violence between the ranchers and farmers, Jorden tries to call for additional help but discovers that the telegraph line serving the town has been cut. Informed that the farmers are headed to town to kill Hall, Bill meets them and reasons with them to allow the law to handle Hall's punishment. On the morning of the hanging, Jorden brings out Hall, threatening to shoot the prisoner himself if anyone tries to stop the hanging but before Hall is executed, the ranchers set the gallows on fire, precipitating a gun battle between opposing factions. Hall is eventually hanged and the cattlemen are brought to justice.

== Cast ==
- John Agar as Sheriff Bill Jorden
- Mamie Van Doren as Ellen Ballard
- Richard Boone as Sam Hall
- Coleen Gray as Nellie Mason
- Leif Erickson as George Ballard
- James Gleason as Orval Jones
- Randy Stuart as Nan Hogan
- Terry Gilkyson as The Music Man
- Paul Fix as Mike MacNamara
- Harry Morgan as Lew Hogan
- Stuart Randall as Jess Ryman
- Robert Osterloh as Rigdon
- Stanley Andrews as Ben Smith
- John Day as Jiggs Larribee
- Stafford Repp as Leo Roos
- Lewis Martin as Pastor Harris
- Renny McEvoy as Timothy Brown
- Jess Kirkpatrick as Ed Pardee
- James Parnell as Mary Tremain
- Anthony Jochim as Doc Quinn
- Clint Eastwood as Tom, a ranch hand (uncredited)

== Production ==
One of the movie's scenes features Coleen Gray and Randy Stuart fighting for possession of incriminating letters hidden in a suitcase. The actresses invited their husbands to watch the scene's filming, which lasted over 50 seconds and included both women punching and wrestling each other. At the conclusion of the choreographed scene, Gray recalled in a later interview, the women simply dusted themselves off, but the two husbands ..."were pale and clammy and weak in the knees" having watched their wives engage in a lengthy fistfight.

The film included an early appearance of Clint Eastwood, who played a very small uncredited role as a ranch hand.

== See also ==
- List of American films of 1956
- Sam Hall (song) § Tex Ritter adaptation
