= The Beautiful Legs of Sabrina =

1958 film directed by Camillo Mastrocinque

- Italian theatrical release poster
- Directed by: Camillo Mastrocinque
- Written by: Edoardo Anton; Marcello Fondato; Vittorio Metz
- Screenplay by: Piero Pierotti
- Story by: Piero Pierotti
- Starring: Mamie Van Doren; Antonio Cifariello; Rossana Martini
- Cinematography: Alvaro Mancori
- Edited by: Roberto Cinquini
- Music by: Lelio Luttazzi
- Production companies: PGC Rome; Central Cinema Company
- Distributed by: Starlight
- Release date: November 21, 1958 (Italy)
- Running time: 109 minutes
- Countries: Italy; West Germany
- Languages: Italian; German; English (dubbed version)

The Beautiful Legs of Sabrina (Italian: Le bellissime gambe di Sabrina, also known as Sabrina's Wonderful Legs and Schönen Beine Der Sabrina) is a low-budget 1958 Italian-West German crime-drama-comedy film directed by Camillo Mastrocinque and starring Mamie Van Doren, Antonio Cifariello, and Rossana Martini. It was written by Piero Pierotti, Edoardo Anton, Marcello Fondato, and Vittorio Metz.

The Beautiful Legs of Sabrina was Mamie Van Doren's first film made away from Hollywood.

== Plot summary ==
A gang of thieves manages to rob a jewelry store. The only clue to track them down is a peculiar mark on the leg of one of them. In the meantime, a photographer wants to participate in a competition organized by a company that produces women's stockings and secretly photographs a lot of girls, including a model who will later reveal herself to be the thief wanted by the police.

== Cast ==
- Mamie Van Doren as Sabrina
- Antonio Cifariello as Teo
- Rossana Martini as Toni
- Raffaele Pisu as Mario
- Enrico Viarisio as Il commendatore
