= 3 Nuts in Search of a Bolt =

1964 film

- Directed by: Tommy Noonan
- Written by: Ian McGlashan; Tommy Noonan
- Produced by: Tommy Noonan
- Starring: Mamie Van Doren; Tommy Noonan
- Cinematography: Fouad Said
- Edited by: William Martin
- Music by: Phil Moody
- Distributed by: Harlequin International Pictures
- Release date: May 29, 1964
- Running time: 78 minutes
- Country: United States
- Language: English

3 Nuts in Search of a Bolt is a 1964 comedy film starring Mamie Van Doren and Tommy Noonan, who also directed and co-wrote the film.

== Plot ==
An out-of-work method actor is hired by a stripper, a male model, and a car salesman to listen to their problems and go see a psychiatrist on their behalf; the three "nuts" lack the funds to see the psychiatrist on their own, hence the request. The actor has to pretend that he alone has all the problems of the three who hired him. The psychiatrist is naturally intrigued and begins secretly recording her sessions with him.

The recordings get broadcast to the entire country. Robert L. Katz, a representative from a film studio, arrives with his aide Lenny, and wants to have a movie made, inspired by Noonan's curious case. They give Noonan a cheque for 100,000; Noonan divides the cheque up between himself and his three housemates. The housemates start to question the morality of what they're having Noonan do for them. Ms. Symbol also seems jealous that Noonan has become so informal in expressing his sentiments concerning Dr. Von.

Ms. Symbol starts seeing Dr. Salverson, another therapist. He and Noonan soon come clean with Dr. Von about everything. In exchange for his silence, Dr. Salverson agrees to diagnose Noonan's three housemates. Dr. Von is reluctant about this at first...until she realizes that any bad press about her might ruin her reputation as the country's leading psychiatrist. She agrees to Salverson's proposition, on the condition that she gets to come up with Noonan's cure.

Noonan visits a pub. The pub gets robbed. Noonan's talking on the phone with Katz as the robbery begins; as he gets off the phone, he gets knocked unconscious by the robbers. The robbers order the bar's patrons to strip and pile their clothes near where Noonan lies unconscious; this would include the jewelry of Mrs. Berkeley-Kent, one of the patrons. Noonan wakes, thinking that he's Bernard. He stuffs the nearby jewelry in his coat and fakes his unconsciousness until after the robbers leave; the robbers order the patrons to not do anything for half an hour. Noonan, now back to his senses, takes his leave, shocking Mrs. Kent, from whom he's inadvertently taken her jewelry.

Dr. Salverson gives the three housemates therapy and diagnoses them. He prescribes that Lynch move into a sanitarium, that Ms. Symbol seek out an unmanned occupation, and that Bernard is a narcissist. Dr. Von virtually endorses all of Dr. Salverson's diagnoses, admitting she would've prescribed the same things for Noonan back when she still thought that all of their issues were his.

Katz arrives, and reports that Noonan has confessed everything, and has offered to give them the check back; this upsets Lynch. Noonan arrives, still reeling from having been in the robbery. Dr. Salverson re-reports his diagnoses of Bernard and Ms. Symbol. Noonan protests this and insists that Ms. Symbol's issue is that she's a virgin, and that Bernard's issue is that he's got to chase a woman who'll challenge him. He recommends Ms. Symbol; Ms. Symbol takes offense to this, leaves the room, and weeps. Repentant, Noonan challenges Bernard to chase Dr. Von instead and goes into the other room to console with Ms. Symbol.

Noonan and Ms. Symbol profess their love for one another. While consoling, they butt heads. Noonan shifts personalities again, thinking that he's Bernard. Ms. Symbol panics, drags Noonan into the first room, and implores the psychiatrists to treat him. Dr. Von applies pressure to Noonan's forehead; Noonan shifts personas again, thinking he's Ms. Symbol. He reprimands Ms. Symbol for wearing "his dress."

The bar patrons arrive; they're clad in tablecloths because their clothes are still missing. Cops are with them. Mrs. Kent points a finger at Noonan, accusing him of having taken her jewelry and their clothes. The sequence ends in a mad chase. From the sidelines, Katz admires the action and admits that it couldn't have ended better. Ms. Twitchell, Mr. Blyth's under-paid secretary and one of the bar's naked patrons, flaunts her derrière, seemingly casting an insult, right before making her exit. Lenny adds to his boss's comment by admitting that Ms. Twitchell's end couldn't look better.

The experience has made Ms. Symbol a big-name showgirl; the entire movie is a flashback, elaborated on by her in one of her show performances.

== Cast ==
- Mamie Van Doren as Saxie Symbol
- Tommy Noonan as himself
- Ziva Rodann as Dr. Myrna Von
- Paul Gilbert as Joe Lynch
- John Cronin as Bruce Bernard
- Howard Koch as Dr. Otis Salverson

== Background ==
On the bonus material section of the film's DVD release, Mamie Van Doren said that this film was inspired by the success of the sex comedy Promises! Promises! which starred Jayne Mansfield and also Tommy Noonan. She said that she was approached to play the lead in Promises! Promises!, but turned it down. Once that film became a hit for Jayne Mansfield, Noonan wrote and directed this film, with Van Doren in mind for a lead role.
