= Born Reckless (1958 film) =

1958 film

- Theatrical release poster
- Directed by: Howard W. Koch
- Written by: Richard H. Landau; Aubrey Schenck
- Produced by: Aubrey Schenck
- Starring: Mamie Van Doren; Jeff Richards
- Cinematography: Joseph F. Biroc
- Edited by: John F. Schreyer
- Music by: Buddy Bregman
- Distributed by: Warner Bros.
- Release date: November 1958
- Running time: 80 minutes
- Country: United States
- Language: English

Born Reckless is a 1958 American Western film starring Mamie Van Doren and released by Warner Bros. Pictures.

== Plot ==
Kelly Cobb travels and performs in various country rodeos in order to get enough money to buy a patch of land to call his own. One day he picks up Jackie Adams, a saloon singer and trick rider whom he saves from a clutching admirer. The two travel together and Jackie begins to fall in love with Kelly. Kelly however doesn't notice because of his drive to risk his life for the dream of the land he pursues. Jackie concludes that Kelly was just born reckless and she strives to change his free-roaming lifestyle.

== Cast ==
- Mamie Van Doren as Jackie Adams
- Jeff Richards as Kelly Cobb
- Arthur Hunnicutt as Cool Man
- Carol Ohmart as Liz
- Tom Duggan as Mark Wilson
- Nacho Galindo as Papa Gomez
- Allegra Varron as Mama Gomez
- Jim Canino as Jose
- Jeanne Carmen as Rodeo Girl

== Production ==
Jeff Richards was cast shortly after his release from Metro-Goldwyn-Mayer. He did a lot of his own stunts, and had to take a brief hiatus after an automobile accident he sustained while driving to rehearsals. Carol Ohmart was offered the part as an apology by Jack Warner for accusing her of hiding her then-husband Wayde Preston, who had walked off the set of Colt .45.
