= Jet Pilot (film) =

1957 film by Josef von Sternberg

- Theatrical release poster
- Directed by: Josef von Sternberg
- Written by: Jules Furthman
- Produced by: Jules Furthman; Howard Hughes (presenter)
- Starring: John Wayne; Janet Leigh
- Cinematography: Winton C. Hoch
- Edited by: Jim Wilkinson (editing supv); Michael R. McAdam; Harry Marker; William M. Moore
- Music by: Bronislau Kaper
- Production company: RKO Radio Pictures
- Distributed by: Universal-International
- Release dates: September 25, 1957 (Premiere-LA); October 4, 1957 (US)
- Running time: 113 minutes
- Country: United States
- Language: English
- Budget: $9,000,000

Jet Pilot is a 1957 American Cold War romance film directed by Josef von Sternberg, starring John Wayne and Janet Leigh, and featuring Jay C. Flippen, Paul Fix, and Hans Conried. It was written and produced by Jules Furthman and presented by Howard Hughes.

Filming lasted more than 18 months, beginning in 1949. The last day of shooting was in May 1953, but the Technicolor film was kept out of release by Hughes due to his tinkering until October 1957, by which time Hughes had sold RKO. Universal-International ended up distributing Jet Pilot. This was Hughes's last film work before his death of kidney failure on April 5, 1976.

The film went through several directorial changes after Sternberg's work between October 1949 and February 1950. After that, Philip Cochran (supervisor of aerial sequences), Furthman, Edward Killy (unit production manager), Byron Haskin (for the model work), and Don Siegel also directed scenes (although Siegel's were not used), as did Hughes himself. All were uncredited as directors or second unit directors.

Although Jet Pilot was publicized as showcasing the U.S. Air Force's latest jets, by the time it was finally shown, most of the aircraft in the film were obsolescent or obsolete, supplanted by more modern aircraft. In one aerial scene, the two lead characters fly a Lockheed F-94 Starfire to test a radar approach to intercept a propeller-driven Convair B-36 bomber.

Jet Pilot was reportedly Howard Hughes's favorite film, one he watched repeatedly in his later years.

== Plot ==
A Soviet Air Force jet lands on a U.S. Air Force base in Alaska. The Air Force base commander, Colonel Jim Shannon, is surprised to discover that the pilot is a woman, Lieutenant Anna Marladovna, who asks for asylum, but refuses to disclose military information. Shannon is assigned to seduce her to persuade her to talk, but falls in love with her in the process. Worried about the possibility of Anna's deportation, he marries her without permission.

When they return from their unauthorized honeymoon, Major General Black takes Jim aside and informs him that they have discovered that his new wife is a spy. The Americans decide to play along, but to turn the situation to their advantage.

Jim goes home to tell Anna that she is to be imprisoned for 15 years and then deported when she is finally released. In a phony defection to turn the spying tables on the Soviets, he proposes they steal an aircraft and fly to the Soviet Union. Unaware of his duplicity, Anna is criticized for having allowed Jim to crash the more advanced American aircraft when Russian fighters closed in, rather than disabling him. She says that she considered shooting him, but decided that he would be more valuable for his knowledge than the plane would have been.

While they are there, Jim is assigned to help test new aircraft, but it is a pretext for drugging him and pumping him for information about American aircraft. He learns much about Soviet capabilities and weaknesses from the questions he is asked, while only giving up outdated information in return.

When Anna, clueless to the drugging, discovers that he is secretly making notes, she pistol whips him about the head. She initially plans to turn him in, but learns he is to be exchanged for Soviet prisoners held by the U.S. after being drugged to permanently destroy his memory, which would include those of her. Longing for the freedom and comforts of American life and genuinely in love with Jim, she disposes of the agent sent to keep an eye on her, steals an aircraft, and the pair escapes back to the U.S.

== Cast ==
- John Wayne as Col. Jim Shannon
- Janet Leigh as Lt. Anna Marladovna Shannon / Capt. Olga Orlief
- Jay C. Flippen as Maj. Gen. Black
- Paul Fix as Maj. Rexford
- Richard Rober as FBI Agent George Rivers
- Roland Winters as Col. Sokolov
- Hans Conried as Col. Matoff
- Ivan Triesault as Gen. Dmitri Langrad

== Production ==
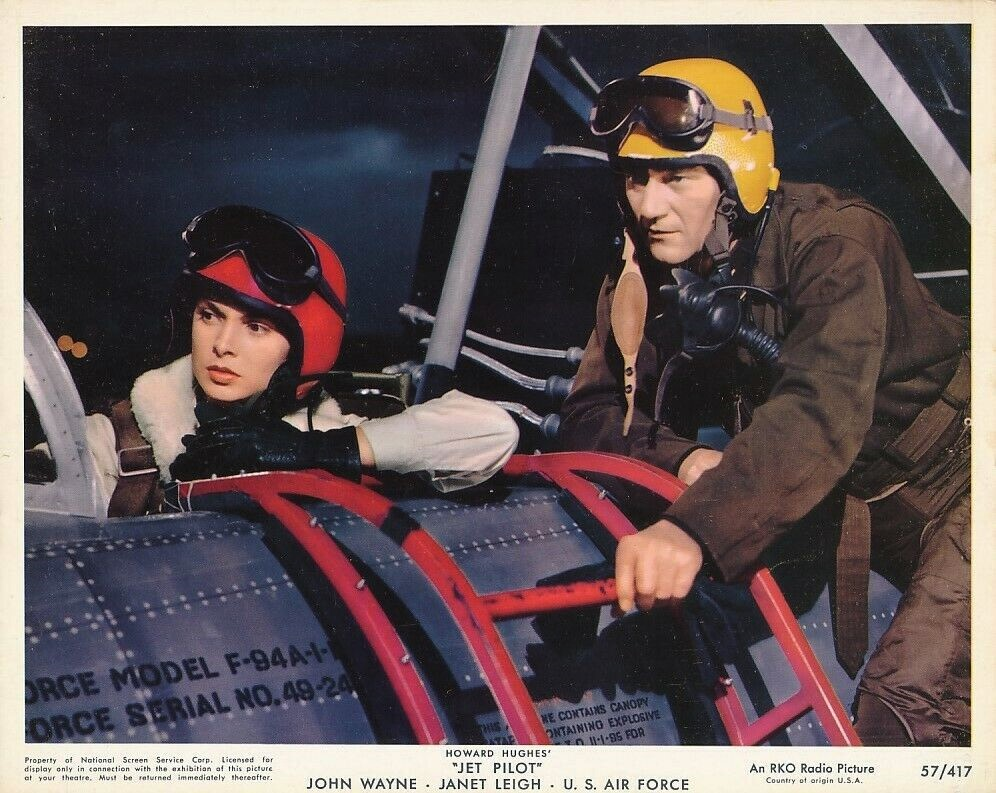
John Wayne and Janet Leigh in Jet Pilot (1957)

Hughes intended to make a "jet-age" Hell's Angels, his 1930 pre-Code flying epic, to the extent that the flying scenes were the most important element, and led to his obsessive re-editing that stretched into years. While filming was completed around 1950, he continued to work on it, and it was finally released in 1957, by which time the aircraft shown were obsolete.

The lead actors fretted that the screenplay was "silly", with Wayne only taking on the role because he thought it would make a political statement, but soon realized it would become "one of the worst films" he would ever make. Wayne later recalled, "The final budget was something like four million. It was just too stupid for words."

Location filming took place primarily at Edwards Air Force Base and Hamilton Air Force Base, California, with full cooperation from the U.S. Air Force (USAF). Much of the filming of flying scenes was done at Edwards using a North American B-45 Tornado bomber as a camera aircraft. Chuck Yeager, the first man to fly faster than the speed of sound, was assigned by the USAF to fly for the film. Yeager flew in the Bell X-1, staged for the film cameras, on May 20, 1950.

Another senior jet pilot who flew in the movie was USAF Major Charles Rayburn Cunningham. Another senior jet pilot, retired USAF Lieutenant Colonel Glen M. "Johnny" Johnson, and he flew for John Wayne and Janet Leigh.

The F-86A Sabre jets depicted in the early sequences were actual operational aircraft of the 94th Fighter Squadron, the first unit so equipped in the USAF, shortly after their conversion to the type in 1949. Yeager also flew the F-86A in a series of aerobatic maneuvers, under the direction of "air boss" Paul Mantz, who coordinated the aerial sequences.

Location filming for the Soviet air base was done at George Air Force Base in Victorville in the desert of Southern California. A World War II-era air base, many of its wartime structures were still intact, giving it a primitive appearance. The 94th Fighter Squadron and its parent 1st Fighter Group were actually based at George during filming and had just finished a deployment to Ladd Air Force Base, Alaska, as depicted in the storyline.

The Soviet parasite fighter that Shannon flies is actually a Bell X-1, the first supersonic aircraft in the world. (Note: The footage of the "Soviet parasite fighter and mother ship" matches the same footage used in the movie The Right Stuff of the B-29 and Bell X-1 taking off for the first supersonic flight.)

The "Yak-12" at the film's beginning is a black-painted Lockheed T-33 Shooting Star. The "mother ship" for the Soviet parasite fighter is actually a Boeing B-50, a development of the B-29. (Note: The Soviets reverse engineered the B-29 from three examples that made emergency landings in the USSR during World War II and produced 847 of them as the Tupolev Tu-4 "Bull".) ; The black fighter that appears near the finale, taxiing on the parking ramp and behind the "mother ship" is a Northrop F-89 Scorpion. An F-86 Sabre is used to depict a Russian chase aircraft, painted in dark colors, high visibility orange, and gray juxtaposed to obscure its actual silhouette. The unpainted fighter that Olga is to test fly is also a Northrop F-89 Scorpion.

John Wayne's character and other characters wear both the original Army Air Forces uniform and the newer USAF blue uniform.

== Reception ==
Despite the obvious similarities to other successful films, including Ernst Lubitsch's Ninotchka (1939) and Comrade X (1940), as well as the more recent dud The Iron Petticoat (1956), by the time Jet Pilot hit the screens, it looked dated and received universally poor reviews. Bosley Crowther of The New York Times referred to it as "silly and sorry", doomed by a "weak script, poor direction, and indifferent performances by all", concluding that it was far from being Hughes's next Hell's Angels. For aviation fans, even the aerial scenes were greatly reduced, as much of the principal photography had taken place early in 1950, making Jet Pilot something of a historical curiosity.

Movie historian Andrew Sarris, writing in 1966 for the Museum of Modern Art's Josef von Sternberg film retrospective, expressed a more favorable opinion of the film than Crowther. Categorizing Jet Pilot as a stealth comedy, Sarris praises its "humor and sensuality" as "enduringly enjoyable" despite a poor reputation among critics. He said that Sternberg "reduces the Cold War to an animated cartoon" and anticipates a number of metaphors that would appear in Stanley Kubrick's 1964 black comedy, Dr. Strangelove. The fighter jets of Russian pilot (Janet Leigh) and American pilot (John Wayne) become interchangeable with the characters, a comic anthropomorphism where "the planes enjoy a more active sex life than the human beings". Sarris considered Wayne and Leigh to be miscast in a Sternberg film, arguing that they were more at home in the "Ford galaxy" or the "Hitchcock universe", respectively. He concluded that however "meaningless" the film, Sternberg's Jet Pilot "soars in an ecstatic flight of speed, grace, and color", and all said, is a "highly entertaining" work.

== See also ==
- List of American films of 1957
- John Wayne filmography
