= The Candidate (1964 film) =

1964 American film

- Theatrical release poster
- Directed by: Robert Angus
- Written by: Joyce Ann Miller; Quenton Vale; Frank Moceri
- Based on: The Candidate; 1964 novel by Frank Moceri
- Produced by: Maurice Duke
- Starring: Mamie Van Doren; June Wilkinson; Ted Knight; Eric Mason
- Cinematography: Stanley Cortez
- Edited by: William Martin
- Music by: Steve Karmen
- Production company: Cosnat Productions
- Distributed by: Atlantic Releasing
- Release date: 7 October 1964
- Running time: 84 minutes
- Country: United States
- Language: English

The Candidate (also known as The Playmates for the Candidate, Party Girls for the Candidate and Kisses for the Candidate) is a 1964 American low-budget film directed by Robert Angus and starring Mamie Van Doren, June Wilkinson, Ted Knight and Eric Mason. It was written by Joyce Ann Miller, Quenton Vale and Frank Moceri.

== Cast ==
- Mamie Van Doren as Samantha Ashley
- June Wilkinson as Angela Wallace
- Ted Knight as Frank Carlton
- Eric Mason as Buddy Parker
- Rachel Romen as Mona Archer
- Robin Raymond as Attorney Rogers
- William Long, Jr. as Falon
- John Matthews as Sen. Harper
