= Sex kitten =

Woman with sexually provocative lifestyle

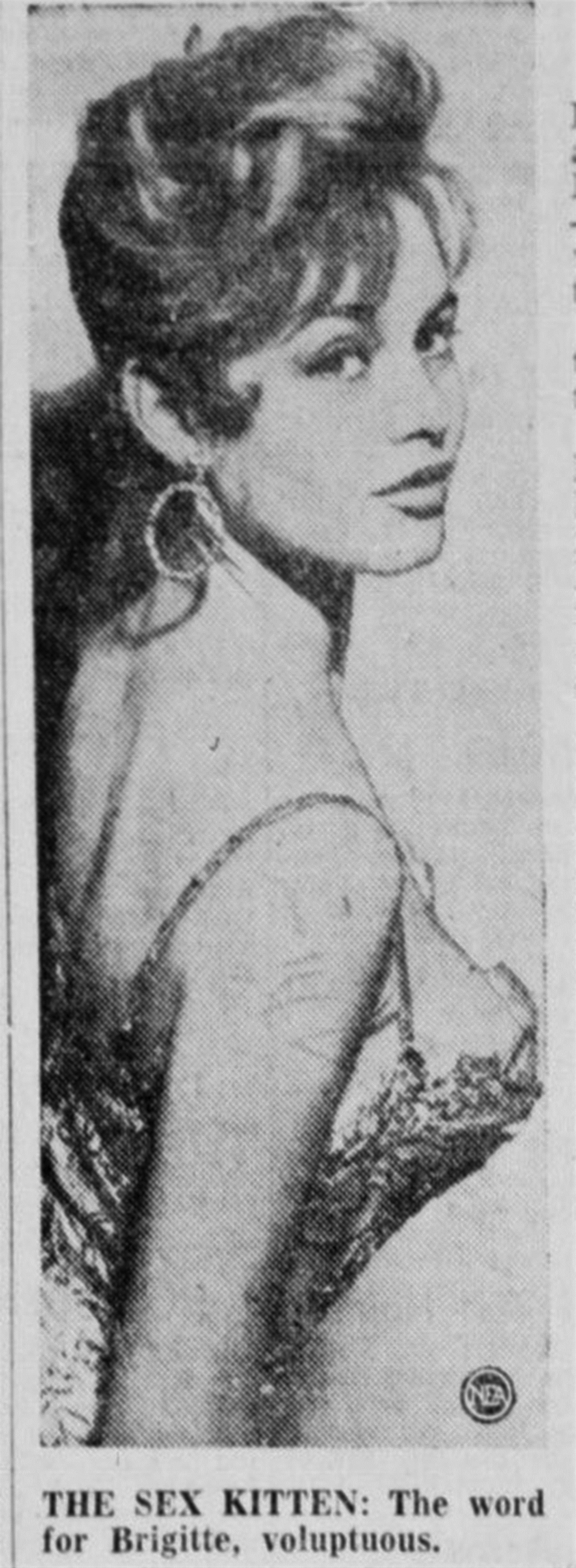
Newspaper clipping of Brigitte Bardot, 1958

A sex kitten is a woman who exhibits a sexually provocative lifestyle or an abundant sexual aggression. The term originated around 1956 in articles in the British and American press and was originally used to describe French actress Brigitte Bardot. Sources believe Bardot's role in And God Created Woman (1956) was what inspired the term in the mid-1950s.

The 1960s began the era of women embracing their sexuality after moving forward from the idea that women were very unlikely to experience pleasure during sexual activities.

== Examples ==
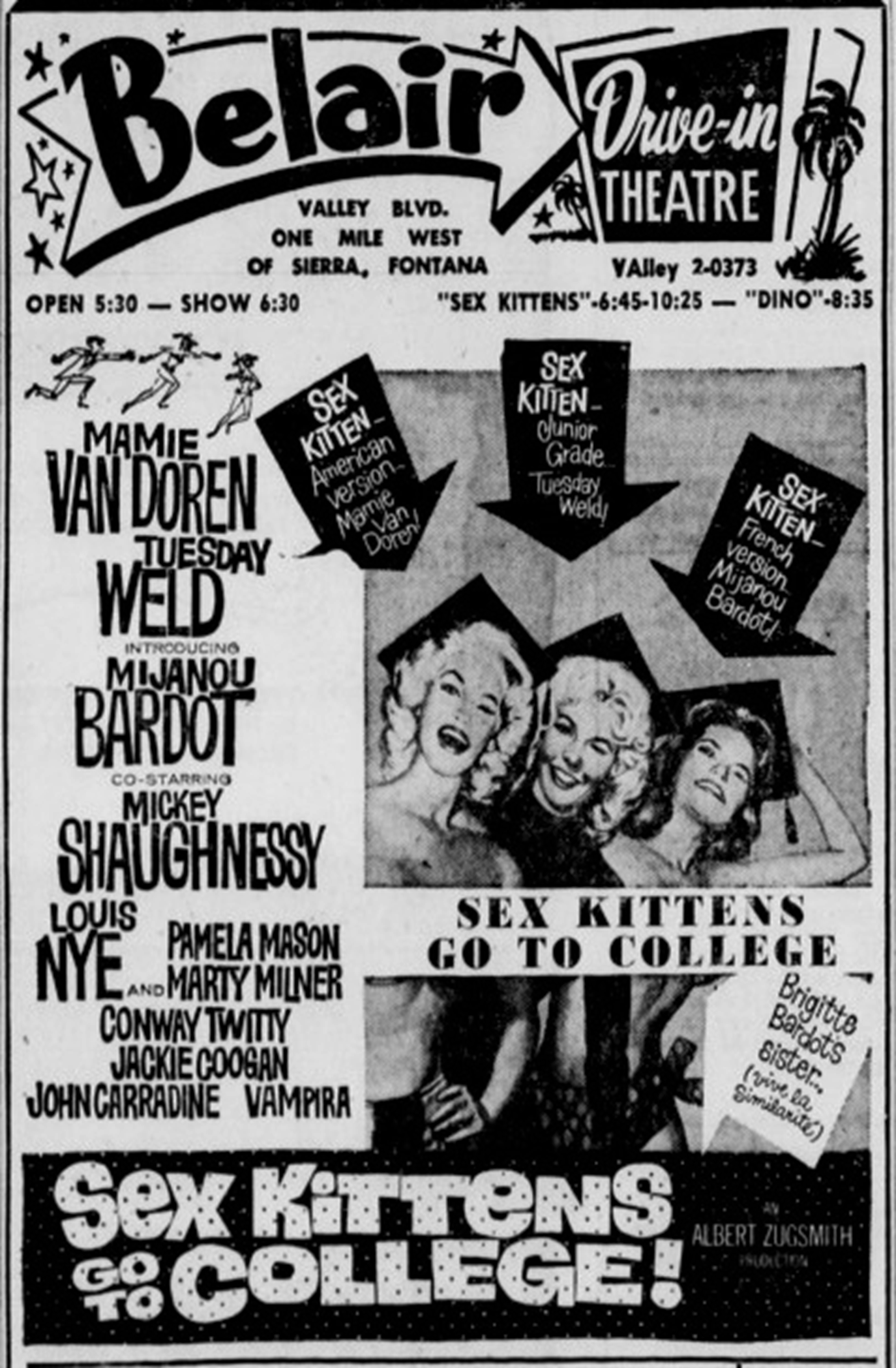
Bel-Air Drive-in advertisement for Sex Kittens Go to College (1960), starring Mamie Van Doren, Tuesday Weld, and Mijanou Bardot

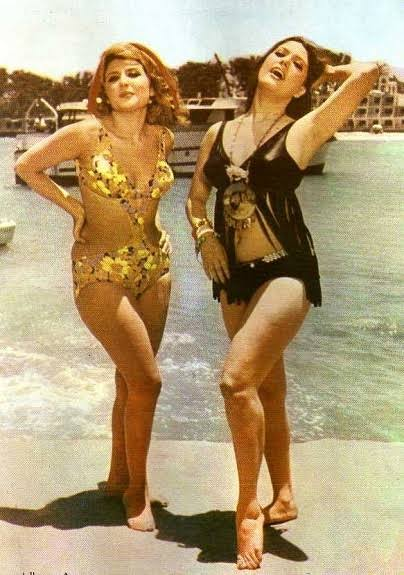
Shams al-Baroudi (right) with Soheir Ramzi (left), both actresses were deemed a sex kitten in 1970s Egyptian cinema

Mamie Van Doren was called a sex kitten due to starring in B-movies in the 1950s and 1960s, including Sex Kittens Go to College (1960), Teacher's Pet (1958), and Untamed Youth (1957). These films often had Van Doren playing seductive and provocative roles. In 1998, when Van Doren created her Web site, she described herself as "the first authentic kitten on Cyberspace".

Ann-Margret was described as a sex kitten in the 1964 film Kitten with a Whip.

Eartha Kitt, singer of the 1953 Christmas hit "Santa Baby", was also deemed a sex kitten due to some of the lyrics in her song.

Jane Fonda was seen as a sex kitten in the 1960s, particularly due to her title role in the 1968 film Barbarella.

Ariana Grande famously wore cat ears during her 2015 Honeymoon Tour for a sex kitten look.

The Associated Press stated that the version of Cornelia Wallace in the film George Wallace, portrayed by actress Angelina Jolie, was depicted as "a shallow sex kitten" and therefore Cornelia Wallace had criticism towards the portrayal.

A sex kitten is not always youthful. In various definitions, the sexual attractiveness of a woman is the primary factor of sex kittens, but that did not necessarily mean physical beauty.

== See also ==
- Cougar (slang) – Woman who seeks romantic or sexual relationships with younger men
- nymphet – English-language term from Nabokov's Lolita
- Girl power – Slogan encouraging women's empowerment
- Sex symbol – Person or character widely regarded as sexually attractive
