= Robert Hill (writer) =

American screenwriter and playwright

Robert Hill is an American screenwriter, playwright, and producer notable for his collaborations with Albert Zugsmith. Hill also wrote eight episodes of the television series The Man from U.N.C.L.E. and two from The Girl from U.N.C.L.E. from 1965 to 1967.

== Select filmography ==
- Arctic Flight (1952)
- Stolen Identity (1952)
- Female on the Beach (1955) - plus author of original play The Besieged Heart
- Raw Edge (1956)
- The Beast of Hollow Mountain (1956)
- A Woman's Devotion (1956)
- The Girl in the Kremlin (1957) - screenwriter
- The Female Animal (1958)
- She Gods of Shark Reef (1958)
- Tarzan, the Ape Man (1959)
- The Private Lives of Adam and Eve (1960)
- Sex Kittens Go to College (1960)
- Dondi (1961)
- Confessions of an Opium Eater (1962) - also associate producer
- Dog Eat Dog (1964)
- Fanny Hill: Memoirs of a Woman of Pleasure (1965) - also associate producer
- Tom Jones Rides Again (1971)
