= Ric Marlow =

American actor (1925–2017)

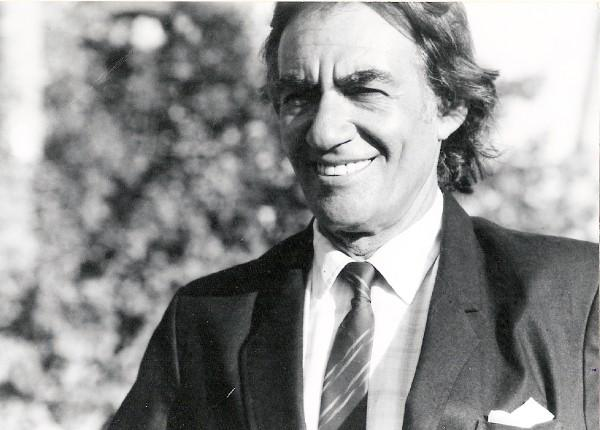
- Born: Sanford Phillip Schafler; December 21, 1925; Bronx, New York, U.S.
- Died: February 28, 2017 (aged 91); Palm Springs, California, U.S.
- Occupations: Producer; singer; songwriter; actor
- Years active: 1961–2017
- Spouses: Katherine Mae Highfill (m. 1947; div. 1953); Irene Flanken; Leslie Parrish (m. 1955; div. 1961); Dorothy Juana Sophia Cobarrubias (m. 1964; div. 1969); Constance Julia Magoncia (m. 1988; died 1996)

Eric "Ric" Marlow (born Sanford Phillip Schafler; December 21, 1925 – February 28, 2017) was an American songwriter and actor, best known for co-writing with Bobby Scott the song "A Taste of Honey" which won a Grammy in 1962. The song has been recorded by approximately 200 artists internationally, including The Beatles, Herb Alpert & The Tijuana Brass, Barbra Streisand, Tony Bennett, and Johnny Mathis. He also had several acting roles, most notably on the television programs, Bonanza, Hawaii Five-O and Magnum, P.I.

== Early life ==
Marlow was born to Bernice (née Berney) and Arthur Schafler in the Bronx, New York. He was raised in Long Island, New York.

Marlow had several accidents in his youth, resulting in broken noses, fractured ankles, torn ligaments, and a fractured skull from a diving accident. Following his school years, he joined the Army, but due to his fractured skull, the Army felt he was unsuitable for duty.

Owing to his love of music, especially singing, he spent a lot of time with his aunt, who worked as a secretary for the president of Chappell & Company, later known as Warner/Chappell Music. He got to meet up-and-coming artists and established celebrities of the time, including Tommy Dorsey, Harry James, Oscar Levant, Rudy Vallee and Red Nichols.

Marlow started his career singing in local cafes across the country. He also worked several odd jobs, from hauling cement to driving a cab. After becoming a featured vocalist at New York's Basin Street, he began singing in major clubs. When he finally landed an appointment with a casting director, he started down the road of acting. He joined the Screen Actors Guild in 1959. Due to his tough, chiseled features, he was usually cast as a bad guy gangster in television shows, including "This Man Dawson", "The Lawless Years", "Border Patrol", "Death Valley Days", "Bonanza" and many others. He became good friends with the stars of those shows.

== A Taste Of Honey ==
Marlow's life took a turn back to music when his former pianist, Bobby Scott, needed someone to help him put together a song for a Broadway adaptation of the play A Taste of Honey, written by Shelagh Delaney. The song they created was also titled "A Taste of Honey".

"I ran over and Bobby and I put this song together in five minutes and rushed it to the theater," Ric reflected one evening to his stepsons, Parris and Dalton. "I never guessed it would become such a hit."

And a hit it was. It has been recorded by hundreds of artists including the Beatles, Tony Bennett, and Peggy Lee. It has sold more than 300 million copies internationally, and earned Marlow a gold record. In 1962, he won a Grammy Award for best instrumental theme.

The version recorded by Herb Alpert & the Tijuana Brass received the most awards.

== Personal life ==
Marlow was married five times and had seven children: one daughter, one step-daughter, and five step-sons.

- Katherine Mae Highfill (married 1947; divorced 1953)
- Irene Flanken
- Leslie Parrish (married 1955; divorced 1961)
- Dorothy Juana Sophia Cobarrubias (married 1964; divorced 1969)
- Constance Julia Magoncia "Julia English-Marlow" (her acting credits were under Julia English) (married 1988; her death 1996)

Marlow died in Palm Springs, California, at the age of 91.

== Filmography ==
Year	Title	Role	Notes
1958	Have Gun – Will Travel		Episode:"The Hanging of Roy Carter"
1960-1961	Sea Hunt	Robert Lewis Bates / Slade / Tomas Velagos / Conrad Barnes / Vincent Reka	5 episodes
1961	You Have to Run Fast	Jay Rocco	
1965	The Incredible Sex Revolution	Jan	
1965	Psychedelic Sexualis	Arthur Borden	

== Bibliography ==
- Marlow, Ric (2015). Tastes of Honey. Escargot Books and Music. ISBN 978-1908191175.
