= Violated =

Violated may refer to:

- Violated (EP), a 1996 EP by Stuck Mojo
- Violated (1996 film), a Nigerian romantic drama film
- Violated!, a 1974 film directed by Albert Zugsmith.
