= Highway Patrol (American TV series) =

American crime drama television series (1955–1959)

- Highway Patrol title screen
- Also known as: Ten-4
- Genre: Action; Police crime drama
- Starring: Broderick Crawford
- Narrated by: Art Gilmore
- Theme music composer: David Rose
- Country of origin: United States
- Original language: English
- No. of seasons: 4
- No. of episodes: 156

Production
- Executive producer: Frederick Ziv
- Producers: Vernon E. Clark; Jack Herzberg; Herbert L. Strock
- Production location: California
- Running time: 30 minutes
- Production company: Ziv Television Programs

Original release
- Network: Syndication
- Release: October 3, 1955 – September 1, 1959

Highway Patrol is an American action crime drama television series produced for syndication from 1955 to 1959. It was "one of the most popular syndicated series in television history", and it was the first American series broadcast in West Germany on that country's public TV channel ZDF.

== Overview ==
Highway Patrol stars Academy Award winner Broderick Crawford as Dan Mathews, the gruff and dedicated head of a police force in an unidentified Western state. Mathews had "no particular title—just the boss," Crawford said.

The program was "based on authentic stories from the files of highway patrol headquarters throughout the country." Episodes dealt with pursuing and arresting criminals such as smugglers, hijackers, and robbers. Two technical advisors (one a California Highway Patrolman on active service and one retired) read scripts before scenes were shot and were present during filming "to speak up whenever a technical violation, however slight, occurred."

A signature shot of the series is fedora-wearing Matthews barking rapid-fire dialogues into a radio microphone as he leans against the door of his black and white patrol car. Crawford's acting style in the series was one of fast-talking, hard as nails, dedication to his job.

Ziv Television Programs produced the show. Crawford signed in April 1955.

Highway Patrol premiered October 3, 1955, with "Prison Break", an episode filmed April 11–13, 1955. Initial ratings were strong, the show running second to I Love Lucy.

Ziv Television Programs produced 156 episodes spanning four TV seasons, 1955–59. During the four years of its run, Highway Patrol would feature many actors who would later become successful stars in their own right, among them Stuart Whitman, Clint Eastwood, Robert Conrad, Larry Hagman, Barbara Eden, Paul Burke, Jeanne Cooper, Leonard Nimoy, Theona Bryant and Ruta Lee.

Highway Patrol is famous for its period cars and its location shooting around the San Fernando Valley and Simi Valley, then mostly rural. Other notable Los Angeles area locations include Griffith Park, as well as Bronson Canyon just above Hollywood. The show also filmed at railroad stations in Glendale, California, identified by a large sign; Alhambra, California; Santa Susana, California; and Chatsworth, California.

Officer uniforms are the CHP style of the day. In seasons one to three, the shoulder patch is essentially the CHP patch with "California" and "Eureka" (state motto) removed; the California bear and other California state seal elements are retained. In season four the show adopted a uniform patch that matches its patrol car emblem, and the badge was changed from a seven-point star similar to the actual CHP badge, to a nondescript shield. Highway Patrol Chief Dan Mathews usually wears a suit and fedora.

Art Gilmore's narration gives Highway Patrol a documentary feel, but several details are never mentioned. While described as a state police agency, the actual state is never identified. It is said to be a western state which borders Mexico. In Season 3, Episode 13, the city where the Highway Patrol headquarters is located is identified as "Hempstead."

A key element of the show is two-way radio communication among patrol cars and headquarters, with heavy use of police code "10-4" (meaning "acknowledged").

Star Trek creator Gene Roddenberry wrote five episodes, sometimes using the pseudonym "Robert Wesley". Future producer Quinn Martin was sound supervisor in the show's early years; style elements of Highway Patrol are evident in his later productions (The Untouchables, The Fugitive, Barnaby Jones, The Invaders, The F.B.I. and The Streets of San Francisco).

When asked why the popular show ended, Crawford said, "We ran out of crimes". Crawford reportedly had had his fill of the show's hectic production schedule (two shows per week), which had caused him to drink more heavily than ever, and he had decided to leave Highway Patrol to make films in Europe. Ziv held up Crawford's 10% share of the show's gross (some $2 million) until Crawford agreed to sign for a new Ziv pilot and TV show, King of Diamonds. After returning from Europe, Crawford signed his new contract with Ziv and later starred in King of Diamonds playing diamond insurance investigator John King. King of Diamonds lasted only one season before being canceled in 1962. Like most Ziv series, Highway Patrol repeats were syndicated for many years, sometimes with name Ten-4. In 2010, ThisTV began airing the series. In 2017, it was added to the lineup on MeTV until its removal on December 27, 2024. Starting on April 1, 2024, the show currently airs on FETV.

== Personnel ==
The only constant regular on Highway Patrol is star Broderick Crawford as Dan Mathews. William Boyett became a regular in the fourth season as Sgt. Ken Williams. Art Gilmore was the narrator. Vernon Clark was the producer. Jack Shoemaker and Frank Runyon were the technical advisors.

== Business aspects ==
Ziv Productions minimized expenses to keep the program "fast and cheap". The theme tune was a royalty-free tune that had been used on Mr. District Attorney on radio. One three-minute scene that involved a robbery, a murder, and an escape was shot in one take.

The program became Ziv's most profitable production, and it was still making money for the company as reruns continued into the mid-1960s. That success led to formation of Economee Films as a subsidiary of Ziv. While the parent company sold first-run episodes to regional sponsors, Economee Films dealt with local TV stations for showing of reruns, which were titled Ten-Four to distinguish them from first-run episodes. In 1959, three stations in New York City were showing the program each week. By August 1957, more than 200 stations in the United States carried the show, and in some markets, it drew a larger audience than network programs. It was also broadcast in "France, Germany, and nearly all of the Latin American countries."

Character Merchandising of New York manufactured clothing and game items for Highway Patrol.

== Recognition ==
The Billboard's Fourth Annual Program and Talent Awards named Highway Patrol the best syndicated film series on the market. Voters also rated the show first as best adventure series. In the same poll, Crawford was selected as best actor in a syndicated show, and he came in second as best performer in an adventure. The show was also named the top syndication first-run series in the magazine's fifth annual survey.

== In other media ==
Comic adaptations of Highway Patrol appear in five issues of the British anthology comic T. V. Picture Stories.

A board game was published, also in the United Kingdom, in 1985 by Bell Toys and Games.

== In popular culture ==
MAD spoofed Highway Patrol in its October 1960 issue (#58), with Mort Drucker providing caricatures of Crawford and other cast members.

In Stephen King's 1986 novel It, Ben Hanscom's childhood idol is Crawford, and more specifically, his portrayal of Mathews.

Neil Young sings “I used to watch Highway Patrol, whittlin' with my knife” in his song “Mideast Vacation” on his 1987 album “Life”.

Crawford makes a cameo in the 1977 episode "Hustle" of CHiPs, which is also about the California Highway Patrol. After chatting about Highway Patrol, Officer Jon Baker (Larry Wilcox) says, tongue-in-cheek, "they don't make TV shows like that anymore." Crawford comes back with, "Yeah that's right, they don't, do they."

In the 1977 blockbuster film Smokey and the Bandit, the Alabama patrolman in the traffic jam (Alfie Wise) interrupted Buford T Justice's greeting by saying, "I don't care if your name is Broderick Crawford!"

To mark the 75th anniversary of the CHP in 2004, the late Los Angeles City Council Member Tom LaBonge, District 4 (which includes parts of Hollywood) asked his "Dollar a Year Man" Gary Goltz to come up with an idea. In response, Goltz created the 10-4 Day Parade which is held every October 4. Approximately 20 to 30 classic police cars from the CHP, LAPD, and many classic cop TV shows parade down Hollywood Boulevard stopping to pay tribute to Broderick Crawford's movie star on the Walk of Fame. They are often joined by Erik Estrada, Kent McCord, and other stars of classic cop TV shows. "The Star and the Car" a documentary about Goltz and his 1955 Broderick Crawford "Highway Patrol" Buick was released in 2018. In 2019 "Broderick Crawford Starring in Highway Patrol" a book on the series written by Goltz was released.

== Show availability ==
All the 156 episodes are now available on DVD from the 35mm masters. The rights to all the 156 episodes are held by Ziv Television Productions' successor United Artists Television under MGM Television. In 2010 episodes began being shown on ThisTV, a network which features classic shows and movies. In 2017, it joined the line-up on MeTV until its removal on December 27, 2024. It has also appeared on MeTV's sister network Decades (now Catchy Comedy). Starting on April 1, 2024, the show is currently airing on FETV. Some episodes of Highway Patrol have been provided online via Hulu.com. MGM Home Entertainment released the first season of Highway Patrol on DVD on August 11, 2010. On April 2, 2013, TGG Direct released seasons 2, 3, and 4 on DVD. In 2026 episodes are available on Amazon Prime in the UK and the U.S.
