= Barbara Walden =

American actress and businesswoman

- Born: 1930 (age 95–96)
- Occupations: Actress; dancer; businesswoman

Barbara Walden (born 1930) is an American former actress, dancer and businesswoman who founded one of the first American cosmetic companies offering products for Black women to be sold in major department stores. She was inspired to create these cosmetics after discovering a lack of suitable makeup during her Hollywood dancing and acting career.

== Early life ==
Walden grew up in Camden, New Jersey, with her parents, four brothers and two sisters. She graduated from Camden Catholic High School, Eckles College of Mortuary Science in Philadelphia and from the Vogue School of New York City. Her father was a mortician. Walden worked in the mortuary business to earn money to travel to California to follow her dream to dance there.

== Dancing and acting career ==
Walden continued to take dancing lessons in Los Angeles. Her first major break came when she performed at the Billy Gray Band Box club in West Hollywood. Among the audience one evening were actress Joan Crawford and gossip columnist Louella Parsons, who later met with Walden to encourage her to explore studio opportunities. Crawford even used her influence to persuade a producer to cast Walden as a dancer in an Ida Lupino film.

In 1959, Walden made headlines when she was selected from 300 auditioning candidates by producers Albert Zugsmith and Aaron (Red) Doff to portray one of Satan's Seven Sinners in the Mickey Rooney movie The Private Lives of Adam and Eve. She was the only African American dancer chosen for the role. An aspect of the production that angered Walden was being told not to touch actor Rooney during the filming. Later, it was noted one of Walden's dance scenes was so “torrid” in the final film that it was cut from the US version, but kept for the European markets.

=== Filmography ===
Selected productions in which Walden acted or danced.

Year	Film	Role	Notes
1955	Untamed	uncredited	Starring Tyrone Power, Susan Hayward
1956	The Ten Commandments	Ethiopian princess, uncredited	Starring Charlton Heston and Yul Brynner
1956	Carmen Jones	uncredited part	Starring Harry Belafonte, Dorothy Dandridge
1959	Night of the Quarter Moon	uncredited part	Starring Julie London, Agnes Morehead, Nat King Cole
1960	The Private Lives of Adam and Eve	Dancer	Starring Mickey Rooney
1964	A Global Affair	uncredited	Starring Bob Hope
1964	What a Way to Go!	uncredited	Starring Shirley MacLaine, Paul Newman
1975	Freaky Friday	Mrs. Benson	Starring John Astin, Jodie Foster, Barbara Harris

Walden turned down parts in movies that offered submissive or demeaning roles for Blacks including Raintree Country (1957) and Cleopatra (1963), both starring Elizabeth Taylor.

== Barbara Walden Cosmetics ==
Walden felt disheartened by the makeup used during her professional acting jobs, as it often left her skin looking unnatural. Determined to find a solution, she decided to create her own makeup. Remembering that a friend's father was a chemist, she collaborated with him to experiment on makeup and moisturizers specifically designed for Black women's skin.

Walden partnered with Los Angeles advertising executive Dan Raeburn. Each contributed $350 starting capital to establish Barbara Walden Cosmetics, Inc. in 1968. The company opened an office in Watts and trained women to sell the product door-to-door and through house parties. An early customer and supporter was Ethel Bradley, the wife of Tom Bradley, mayor of Los Angeles (1973–1993). By 1971, company gross revenues approached $350,000.

In 1972, the cosmetics line expanded distribution to departments chains, starting with I. Magnin, in Los Angeles. followed by the May Co., the Broadway, Chicago's Carson Pirie Scott and others. The product line began to appeal to Caucasian and women of other ethnic groups.

By 1979, the Barbara Walden Cosmetics company had generated $1 million in sales. Fifty-five products were available in several African countries, Saudi Arabia, Holland, France, Singapore, Australia, Fuji, New Zealand, Papua and New Guinea.

In interviews, Walden attributed the success of the company to her faith in God and the "personalized attention" customers receive at Walden cosmetic counters.

== NAACP Beverly Hills/Hollywood Branch ==
In 1962, Barbara Walden was one of the founding members of the Beverly Hills/Hollywood branch of the National Association for the Advancement of Colored People (NAACP) with golfer Maggie Hathaway. At the time, Walden lived in Beverly Hills. She helped collect the 35 signatures required from the few Black residents as well non-Black neighbors to gain a charter to establish the branch. Those who signed included Rita Davis, step-mother of Sammy Davis Jr., and designer Richard Blackwell, a next-door neighbor of Walden. The charter was granted on June 1, 1962, with Hathaway serving as president and board members including Walden and attorney James L. Tolbert.

Walden was motivated to change the stereotyped programs and racism experienced in Hollywood through the organization. Additionally, she waged a letter-writing campaign to urge the film industry to portray Blacks more positively.

== Book ==
- Walden, Barbara; Landner, Vicki (1981), Easy Glamour: The Black Woman's Definitive Guide to Beauty and Style, Morrow, ISBN 9780688004163

== Recognition ==
United States Congress. "Miss Barbara Walden." Hon. Thomas M. Rees of California in the House of Representatives, Congressional Record, vol. 117, no. 2, U.S. Government Printing Office, 10 Feb. 1971, p. 2709. Congressional Record Archive.

"The Beat Effect." The Black Beauty Effect, season 1, episode 1, created by Andrea Lewis, FaceForward Productions, 2022. This episode explores the early history and trailblazers in cosmetics for Black women, including Barbara Walden, Anthony Overton and Anita Patti Brown.
