= Sappho Darling =

- Directed by: Gunnar Steele
- Written by: Albert Zugsmith
- Produced by: Hal Senter
- Release date: 1968
- Country: Sweden
- Language: English

Sappho Darling is a 1968 film written by Albert Zugsmith.

== Cast ==
- Carol Young as Sappho
- Yvonne d'Angers as Brigitte
- Alyn Darnay as Sven
- Sally Sanford as Luana
- Julia Blackburn as Britt
