= Psychedelic Sexualis =

- Directed by: Albert Zugsmith
- Written by: Albert Zugsmith
- Produced by: Robert Caramico
- Edited by: Herman Freedman
- Production company: Famous Players Corp.
- Release date: 1966
- Country: United States
- Language: English

Psychedelic Sexualis (also known as On Her Bed of Roses), is a 1966 American film directed and written by Albert Zugsmith.

== Plot ==
Stephen Long has a sexual fetish for roses, and murderous desires. His next-door neighbour and girlfriend is Melissa Borden, a nymphomaniac who turns to a psychologist for help.

== Cast ==
- Ronald Warren as Stephen Long
- Sandra Lynn as Melissa Borden
- Barbara Hines as Joanna Borden
- Lee Gladden as Dr. Krafft-Ebing
- Ric Marlow as Arthur Borden
- Regina Gleason as Rachel Long
- Lovey Song as Sally Marsh
- Richard Clair as detective
- Ned York as Jimmy Blake
- Pat Barrington as belly dancer (as Pat Barringer)

== Reception ==
Boxoffice wrote: "There are no cast names to exploit in this sex-oriented drama, but exploitation value for a definite patronage it certainly has. ... While purporting to be serious psychological drama based on Dr. Krafft-Ebing's Psychopathia Sexualis, for exhibiting purposes this could only run in specialized spots where children are restricted, and should be advertised for exactly what it is – a film with some violence and much sex."
