= Betty Steinberg =

American film editor

- Born: Elizabeth Steinberg; March 5, 1910; California, U.S.
- Died: March 22, 1965 (aged 55); California, U.S.
- Occupation: Film editor

Betty Steinberg (1910-1965) was an American film and television editor active primarily in the 1950s and 1960s.

== Biography ==
Steinberg was born on March 5, 1910, to Moshe "Aaron" and Sarah Steinberg. She was the twin sister of future film executive Abe Steinberg; their sister Rose later became a script supervisor at Fox. She died in Los Angeles, California, in 1965.

== Selected filmography ==
- Escape from Hell Island (1963)
- The Second Time Around (1961)
- Madison Avenue (1961)
- Swingin' Along (1961)
- Twelve Hours to Kill (1960)
- The Miracle of the Hills (1959)
- The Abductors (1957)
- The Killing (1956)
- The Siege at Red River (1954)
- The Twonky (1953)
