= Yvonne d'Angers =

Iranian-American stripper and actress (1944–2009)

Yvonne d'Angers, also Yvonne Boreta or Yvonne Mahviz Boreta, (September 2, 1944–June 3, 2009) was an Iranian-born stripper and actress based in San Francisco, California. Known as "the Persian Lamb" while dancing in San Francisco clubs, her most important contribution may be from a landmark obscenity case which made San Francisco the first city in the United States to legally allow topless dancing. A portrait of her seated in her dressing room is featured in the Diane Arbus collection "An Aperture Monograph" and she made headlines in 1966 after staging a protest against her deportation by chaining herself to the Golden Gate Bridge. After landing roles in the films Sappho Darling (1968), The Seven Minutes (1971), and Ground Zero, she moved to Las Vegas, Nevada with her husband Voss Boreta where she lived until she died on June 3, 2009, at the age of 64.

== Early life ==
D'Angers was born Mahviz Daneshforouz on September 2, 1944, in Tehran, Iran. It has been speculated that she arrived in the United States on a student visa in 1959, living in New York. Upon moving to San Francisco in 1962, d'Angers was dancing at clubs in San Francisco's North Beach neighborhood like Gigi's and, most famously, Off Broadway. Her Iranian heritage, large eyes, and sweet demeanor led to the media's nickname, "the Persian Lamb".

== Obscenity trial ==
A this time, topless dancing was not allowed in the United States. Following a dramatic topless act by fellow San Francisco stripper Carol Doda, an obscenity case was brought against The Condor Club and four dancers (d'Angers, Doda, Kay Star, and Euraine Heimberg) who were arrested during raids on topless clubs in 1965. The court went on to determine in favor of the defendants; that topless dancing was not obscene because it did not violate the community standards of San Francisco. This landmark decision paved the way for topless dancing, and later nude dancing, to become legal throughout the country (later amendments banned fully nude dancing at establishments serving alcohol, which remains the standard). In addition to clubs in San Francisco, Yvonne later performed "briefly" in Las Vegas as well as on nationwide tours.

== Golden Gate Bridge protest ==
Facing deportation charges from a claim she entered into a fraudulent marriage in 1961 to gain citizenship, she famously staged a protest on August 30, 1966, where she was chained to the Golden Gate Bridge by her agent. News footage captured this spectacular display of defiance, including strongly-worded comments as she approached the bridge, being bound with chains, and the moment she threw the key of the chain's lock over her shoulder into the bay below. The deportation order never materialized, and she continued to live and work in the United States.

== Peak of career ==
Following at least a year of high-profile publicity from the obscenity trial, and enhanced by the bridge protest, d'Angers was also featured in men's magazines throughout the late-60's such as Tonight, Whisper, Midnight, Cabaret, and even a September 1966 Playboy pictorial. Just weeks before her protest on the bridge, she was featured in the first publicity photo for Caeser's Palace in Las Vegas and worked the casino's opening as "Cleopatra '66". During this time she also transitioned from stage to screen, landing credited roles in the films Sappho Darling (1968), The Seven Minutes (1971), and Ground Zero (1973).

== Later years ==
D'Angers married Off Broadway club owner Voss Boreta, who was also her manager. They moved to Las Vegas in 1974, leaving adult entertainment behind for other business pursuits in the golf industry. In the Las Vegas area, they lived and raised three children together until her death on June 3, 2009. Yvonne's obituary mentioned her being a college graduate and an accomplished painter, however, little documentation is available to expand on these subjects.
