= It's All Adam's Fault =

1958 film

- Directed by: Jacqueline Audry
- Written by: Raymond Caillava; Pierre Laroche; Luisa-María Linares(novel)
- Produced by: Jean Lefait; Raymond Logeart
- Starring: Dany Robin; Jacques Sernas; Mijanou Bardot
- Cinematography: Roger Dormoy
- Edited by: Marguerite Beaugé
- Music by: Michel Emer
- Production companies: Socipex; Sonofilm
- Distributed by: Sonofilm
- Release date: 26 February 1958
- Running time: 96 minutes
- Country: France
- Language: French

It's All Adam's Fault or In Six Easy Lessons (French: C'est la faute d'Adam) is a 1958 French comedy film directed by Jacqueline Audry and starring Dany Robin, Jacques Sernas and Mijanou Bardot.

== Cast ==
- Dany Robin as Eléonore 'Nora' de Savigny
- Jacques Sernas as Gérard Sandret
- Mijanou Bardot
- Armand Bernard as L'ambassadeur
- René Berthier
- Maurice Biraud
- Michèle Cordoue as Lucienne Langeac
- Max Dalban as Jean-Loup
- Jean Degrave
- Paul Demange as Félicien
- Bernard Dhéran as Le comte Philippe de Bergen
- Jean Droze
- Michel Etcheverry as Adam de Casaubon
- André Gabriello as Jean-Luc
- Léa Gray
- Denise Grey as Jeanne Sandret
- Suzanne Grey
- Jacques Hilling
- René Hiéronimus
- Robert Le Béal
- René Lefèvre as Le comte Norbert de Cazaubon
- Elisabeth Manet as Maryse Gillet
- Maryse Marion as Léa
- Jacques Muller
- Henri Nassiet as Monsieur Gillet
- Julienne Paroli
- Noël Roquevert as Antoine
- Gaby Sylvia as Hélène de Bergen
- Robert Thomas
- Jean-Pierre Vaguer
- Simone Vannier
- Robert Vattier as Noël
- Henri Virlojeux

== Bibliography ==
- Sharon Smith. Women who Make Movies. Hopkinson and Blake, 1975.
