= Two Roses and a Golden Rod =

- Directed by: Albert Zugsmith
- Release date: 1969
- Country: United States
- Language: English

Two Roses and a Golden Rod is a 1969 pornographic erotic film directed by Albert Zugsmith. The film focuses on the sexual adventures of a Hollywood-based family as they deal with their own romantic and sexual urges within and outside their household.

== Plot ==
In 1972 Los Angeles, film screenwriter Billy Waters lives in Hollywood with his wife Sheree Sudaine, a British actress who stars in several of his films, and their fifteen-year-old daughter Junior. Despite being father and daughter, Billy and Junior have an incestuous sexual attraction to each other. Junior constantly flirts with her father, while Billy keeps his incestuous urges to himself despite his wife pointing out his obvious attraction to her. Sheree regularly argues with the undisciplined Junior. Their neighbor Lou Jean, meanwhile, is attracted to both Billy and Sheree, especially after encountering them during a party held by her brother Artie where Billy rescued her from gropers and kissed her.

Billy's marriage to Sheree is loveless as he could not leave her due to his reliance on her starring in his films, often turning to his lust for his daughter in writing erotic scripts. While having a champagne bath together to reignite their love, Billy and Sheree reminisce when Billy first had sex with the then-fifteen-year-old Sheree for the first time, which led to Sheree getting pregnant with Junior and their eventual marriage. The two talk about Lou Jean; despite saying they will remain loyal to each other, they admit their attraction to her.

Junior makes out with her French tutor Charlie, but Junior refuses to have sex with him as to save herself for her father. Charlie narrates a bizarre story of how ridiculous purity culture is. After his story ends, Charlie and Junior decide to have sex, with Charlie teaching her fellatio. Billy walks in on Charlie and Junior making out, causing Charlie to quickly escape the premises. Junior, still topless, uses the moment to try to seduce her father, while Billy reiterates that as her father he only sees her as his child, and that he is loyal to his wife. Junior reminds him of when they kissed romantically; Billy reminds her that he was drunk and thought she was Sheree. Junior then says that if she cannot have him, then she can move on to the significantly older Sir Harry, a wealthy socialite pushing sixty who had recently separated from his fifth wife and kissed Junior during a party. To prove he does love her, Billy takes Junior to a big night out into town. When they arrive home, Billy continuously rebuffs his daughter's proposals to have sex and the two simply drink instead.

Meanwhile, Sheree visits Lou Jean and takes a swim with her; they eventually kiss. Lou Jean tearfully confesses a time when her stepmother and her ex-boyfriends drugged and raped her until her father and brother arrived in the nick of time, causing her stepmother and her fellow rapists to flee but resulting in her lifelong fear of being touched and groped by men. She shares that Billy was the only man who wasn't "grabbing" her hence she fell in love with him. Junior changes into provocative lingerie and enters her father's bed where she begins kissing a half-asleep Billy, who believes he is kissing Sheree. Sheree arrives home and catches her husband and their daughter on the verge of sex, and she forcefully pulls out Junior, who flees to her room. Not believing that Billy was unaware Junior was the one he was kissing, Sheree forces Billy to move out and calls Lou Jean to move in as both her lover and Junior's new tutor.

The next morning, Lou Jean arrives and she and Sheree find that Junior has fled home, informing Billy of her disappearance. After Sheree cries about Junior in Lou Jean's arms, the two have sex. Billy arrives home and catches the two in bed, and Sheree invites him to have sex with the two of them. Junior returns home and catches the three making love. Junior declares that, having been ultimately rejected by her father, she had moved in with Sir Harry as his new lover and is at home to pick up her valuables before she bids her parents farewell. With Junior no longer needing assistance, Lou Jean leaves as well, having realized being lovers with both Billy and Sheree has been too much for her. After saying goodbye, Lou Jean tearfully picks up her belongings and leaves.

== Cast ==
- John Alderman – Billy Waters
- Elizabeth Knowles – Sheree Sudaine
- Ami Paisley – Junior Waters
- Lois Ursone – Lou Jean
