= Platinum High School =

1960 film

- Directed by: Charles Haas
- Screenplay by: Robert Smith
- Based on: Irving Shulman
- Produced by: Albert Zugsmith
- Starring: Mickey Rooney; Terry Moore; Dan Duryea
- Cinematography: Russell Metty
- Edited by: Gene Ruggiero
- Music by: Van Alexander
- Color process: Black and white
- Production company: Zugsmith-Fryman
- Distributed by: Metro-Goldwyn-Mayer
- Release dates: May 13, 1960 (United States); May 25, 1960 (New York City)
- Running time: 95 minutes
- Country: United States
- Language: English
- Budget: $627,000
- Box office: $570,000

Platinum High School is a 1960 American crime drama romance film directed by Charles Haas and starring Mickey Rooney, Terry Moore and Dan Duryea. It was based on the 1960 novel of the same name by Irving Shulman.

== Plot ==
Sailing to a coastal California island, Steven Conway sets out to find out what caused the mysterious death of his son. Denied food and lodging at his first two stops, Conway goes to a remote and elite military school on Sabre Island. The school is run by Major Redfern Kelly, whose secretary Jennifer Evans wonders why it took Conway four months to come inquire about his son.

Conway explains that he had been in Pakistan the past few months on a business project and only recently found out that the boy's mother, now deceased, had sent him to this exclusive academy with the $10,000 tuition. He asks to see his son's records and to speak to a student, Crip Hastings, who might have witnessed the boy's death.

Jennifer is having an affair with the married Kelly and warns the major not to let Conway speak to the Hastings boy. Three cadets begin to harass Conway, attempting to provoke him into a fight. They taunt Crip as well, warning him to say nothing.

Conway learns that his son was accidentally killed by the cadets in a brutal initiation rite. On the boat home, Jennifer pretends to help, but has arranged an ambush. It backfires as she falls into shark-infested waters while Conway sets the boat ablaze with Kelly aboard. He makes his way back to shore safely when Joe Nibley shoots at the sharks in the water.

== Cast ==
- Mickey Rooney as Steven Conway
- Terry Moore as Jennifer Evens
- Dan Duryea as Maj. Redfern Kelly
- Conway Twitty as Billy Jack Barnes
- Warren Berlinger as Crip Hastings
- Yvette Mimieux as Lorinda Nibley
- Jimmy Boyd as Bud Starkweather
- Richard Jaeckel as Hack Marlow
- Elisha Cook Jr. as Harry Nesbit
- Jack Carr as Joe Nibley
- Christopher Dark as Vince Perley
- Harold Lloyd Jr. as Charlie-Boy Cable
- Fred Coby as Officer

== Production ==
The film was the last made in a six-film deal between producer Albert Zugsmith and MGM.

== Reception ==
According to MGM records the film earned $175,000 in the US and Canada and $150,000 elsewhere, making a loss to the studio of $270,000.

== See also ==
- List of American films of 1960
