= The Miracle of the Hills =

1959 film

- Theatrical release poster
- Directed by: Paul Landres
- Screenplay by: Charles Hoffman
- Produced by: Richard E. Lyons
- Starring: Rex Reason; Nan Leslie; Betty Lou Gerson; Charles Arnt; Jay North; June Vincent
- Cinematography: Floyd Crosby
- Edited by: Betty Steinberg
- Music by: Paul Sawtell; Bert Shefter
- Production company: Associated Producers Inc
- Distributed by: 20th Century Fox
- Release date: July 29, 1959
- Running time: 73 minutes
- Country: United States
- Language: English

The Miracle of the Hills is a 1959 American Western film directed by Paul Landres and written by Charles Hoffman. The film stars Rex Reason, Nan Leslie, Betty Lou Gerson, Charles Arnt, Jay North and June Vincent. The film was released on July 29, 1959, by 20th Century Fox.

== Plot ==
A minister arrives at a run-down mining town to take over the church there. He finds he has his work cut out for him, especially when an earthquake causes a flood in the mineshaft and traps some of the local children.

== Cast ==
- Rex Reason as Scott Macauley
- Nan Leslie as Joanne Tashman
- Betty Lou Gerson as Kate Peacock
- Charles Arnt as Fuzzy
- Jay North as Davey Leonard
- June Vincent as Mrs. Leonard
- Paul Wexler as Sam Jones
- Ken Mayer as Milo Estes
- Kelton Garwood as Seth Jones
- Claire Carleton as Sally
- Tom Daly as Mike
- Tracy Stratford as Laurie Leonard
- Gil Smith as Mark Leonard
- Theona Bryant as Alison Wingate
- I. Stanford Jolley as Dr. Tuttle
- Gene Roth as Sheriff Crane
- Gene Collins as Silas Jones

== Production ==
Filming started 17 March 1959. It was June Vincent's film debut.
