= The Last Time I Saw Archie =

1961 film by Jack Webb

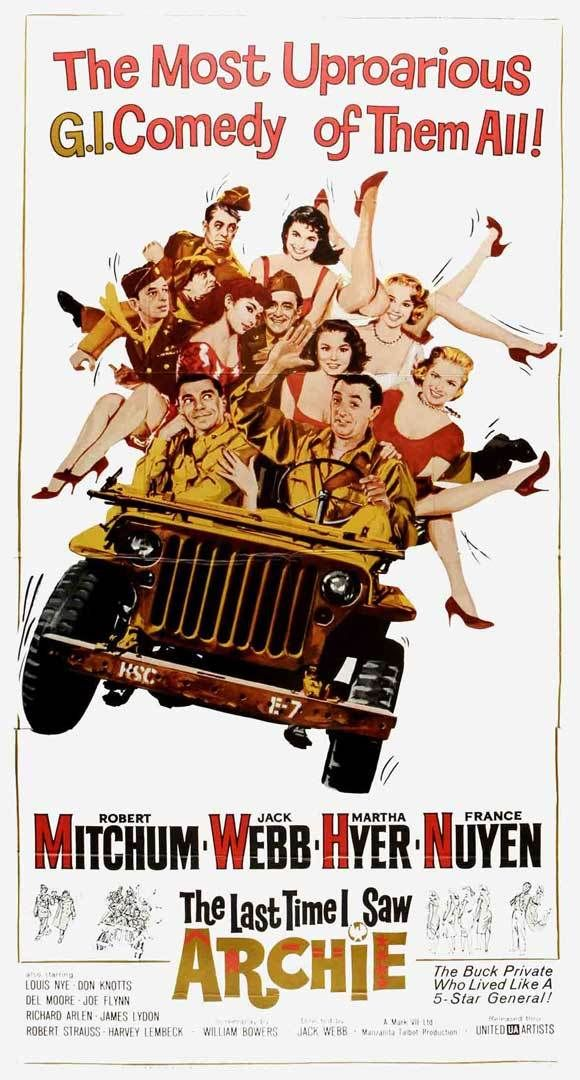
- Theatrical release poster
- Directed by: Jack Webb
- Written by: William Bowers
- Produced by: Jack Webb
- Starring: Robert Mitchum; Jack Webb; Martha Hyer; France Nuyen
- Narrated by: Jack Webb
- Cinematography: Joseph MacDonald
- Edited by: Robert Leeds
- Music by: Frank Comstock
- Production companies: Manzanita-Talbot Productions, Mark VII, Ltd.
- Distributed by: United Artists
- Release date: May 27, 1961
- Running time: 98 minutes
- Country: United States
- Language: English
- Box office: $1,350,000

The Last Time I Saw Archie is a 1961 comedy film set in the waning days of World War II. Robert Mitchum stars as Archie Hall, a lazy, scheming American in the Civilian Pilot Training Program, an aviation school for pilots too old to fly aircraft but not too old to fly military gliders and liaison aircraft. Jack Webb produced, directed and costarred.

== Plot ==
In flying school, lazy Private Archie Hall somehow dominates everyone around him, fellow trainees, sergeants and officers alike, and manages to avoid doing any work. Bill Bowers, a Hollywood screenwriter in civilian life, becomes his sidekick. An initially hostile, suspicious trio of privates, Sam Beacham, Russell Drexler, and Frank Ostrow, are penalized for opposing him and eventually smarten up and become his pals as well. Archie exudes so much self-confidence that Master Sergeant Stanley Erlenheim becomes convinced that he is an undercover G-2 (counterintelligence) general. Erlenheim and his underling, Sergeant Malcolm Greenbriar, arrange it so that Archie and his buddies are given permanent passes and a personal jeep, so they can leave the training base whenever they please. Archie sees Cindy Hamilton every night, while Bill pairs off with Peggy Kramer. Archie also arranges for the three other privates to acquire gorgeous girlfriends as well.

As time goes by, Bill comes to suspect that Cindy is a Japanese spy, but he cannot get Archie to take it seriously (even though Cindy keeps giving him money in outsized old bills). It turns out that Cindy actually is a spy, but for American counterintelligence, despite the opposition of her guardian, Colonel Edwin Martin, the base commander. Sergeants Erlenheim and Greenbriar get into trouble when they break down the door of her apartment, thinking they will catch her in the act of reporting to the enemy, only to find her presenting her findings to Martin.

As the war winds down, requirements change and the trainees are given the choice of retraining to become either aerial gunners or glider pilots. Archie and Bill opt for the latter, despite the supposedly high casualty rate, so the other three do the same, only to discover that Archie and Bill have gotten themselves safe jobs at the base. However, the war ends before any of them see combat.

Archie invites himself to spend a week with Bill in Hollywood. Bill is shown hard at work in his tiny office at a film studio; Archie has somehow become his boss, and has just been promoted to head of the studio. Bill jokes about seeing him in the White House. A later newspaper headline states that Governor Hall has decided to run for president.

== Cast ==
- Robert Mitchum as Archie Hall
- Jack Webb as William "Bill" Bowers
- Martha Hyer as Peggy Kramer
- France Nuyen as Cindy Hamilton
- Louis Nye as Pvt. Sam Beacham
- Joe Flynn as Pvt. Russell Drexler
- Del Moore as Pvt. Frank Ostrow
- Jimmy Lydon as Pvt. Billy Simpson
- Richard Arlen as Col. Edwin Martin
- Don Knotts as Capt. Harry Little
- Robert Strauss as MSgt. Stanley Erlenheim
- Harvey Lembeck as Sgt. Malcolm Greenbriar
- Claudia Barrett as Lola
- Theona Bryant as Daphne
- Elaine Devry as Carole
- Marilyn Burtis as Patsy Ruth
- Howard McNear as Gen. Williams
- James Mitchum as Corporal
- John Nolan as Lt. Oglemeyer
- Nancy Kulp as Miss Willoughby
- Don Drysdale as Soldier in E-Club
- Billy Kilmer as Soldier
- Lillian Powell

== Production ==
The movie cost nearly $2 million to produce, Webb's most expensive production at that time, but only grossed about half its production cost.

The main character in The Last Time I Saw Archie, played by Robert Mitchum was based on Arch Hall Sr., whom screenwriter William Bowers knew in the war. However, the film was made without the permission of Hall, who successfully sued the producers and won a settlement. The film also features the debuts of baseball pitcher Don Drysdale and football quarterback Billy Kilmer in cameos. Portions of the film were shot at Fort MacArthur.

== Reception ==
The film review in The New York Times summarized The Last Time I Saw Archie as part of the "too many cooks syndrome", "... especially military chefs—spoiling the broth appears to be painfully true of The Last Time I Saw Archie." The Los Angeles Times review said, "The most irritating fact is that it could have been a really hilarious picture, but every time the action shows promise of better things to come, it bogs down in the same old static situations and these receive no help from William Brower's script or Jack Webb's direction."

== Novelization ==
In an unusual (if not entirely singular) approach to tie-in fiction, Jack Webb's production company decided to create the impression that the film was based on a pre-existing book. They commissioned a young Robert Carlisle (who would later distinguish himself as a war historian) to novelize the Bowers script, which he did, under his by-line, delivering it as the first-person memoir of a character named Burns instead of Bowers (first name still Bill). The adaptation was published as Archie (suggesting that this was the screenplay's original title) by Pocket Books in the guise of a non tie-in, standalone novel, in February 1960, 15 months prior to release of the film, likely prior to the start of production as well. (The only "tell" indicating the book's progeny is on the copyright page: In tiny print, the rights holder is Jack Webb's company, Mark VII Productions.) Novelizations of the era were commonly released weeks, even months, prior to a film's release, in the hopes that a strong selling book might drum up interest and even critic-proof the movie; but to have one designed to let the reader infer that it was the basis for the film that it was itself based on... well, it was a strategy worthy of Arch Hall himself. The novelization's subsequent tie-in edition, published under the revised title, The Last Time I Saw Archie—its cover featuring Nuyen, Mitchum, Webb and Hyer with arms linked, walking forward—didn't spill the beans either. Indeed, in small print, the cover gets to legitimately claim, "(Original title: ARCHIE)", extending the illusion that the book came before the uncredited screenplay.

== See also ==
- List of American films of 1961
