= The Pirate of the Black Hawk =

- Directed by: Sergio Grieco
- Screenplay by: Engo Alfonsi; Mario Caiano; Sergio Grieco; Guido Zurli
- Story by: Kurt Nachmann; Rolf Olsen
- Produced by: Carlo Prescino; Giorgio Prescino
- Starring: Gérard Landry; Pina Bottin; Andrea Aureli; Mijanou Bardot
- Cinematography: Vincenzo Seratrice
- Edited by: Enzo Alfonzi
- Music by: Roberto Nicolosi
- Production companies: Emmepi Cinematografica; Comptoir Français du Productions
- Release date: 13 November 1958 (Italy)
- Running time: 72 minutes
- Countries: Italy; France

The Pirate of the Black Hawk (Italian: Il pirata dello sparviero nero) is a 1958 international co-production film starring Brigitte Bardot's sister Mijanou Bardot. The film was a co-production between Italy's Emmepi Cinematografica and France's Comptoir Français du Productions.

== Cast ==
- Mijanou Bardot as Eleanor
- Gérard Landry as Richard
- Andrea Aureli as Manfred
- Ettore Manni as Johnny
- Pina Bottin as Eva
- Eloisa Cianni as Stella
- Germano Longo as Mark
- Andrea Miano as Bearded Pirate
- Nazzareno Zamperla as Pirate with Ambassador Francesa (uncredited)

== Release ==
The Pirate of the Black Hawk was released in Italy on 13 November 1958. The film was distributed in the United States by Filmgroup. It was released in the United States in December 1961. The film was shot in color, but released in black-and-white when distributed in the United States. It was released by Anglo Amalgamated in Great Britain in May, 1961, in full Supercinescope and Technicolor.

== Footnotes ==
=== References ===
- Hughes, Howard (2011). Cinema Italiano – The Complete Guide From Classics To Cult. London – New York: I.B.Tauris. ISBN 978-1-84885-608-0.
- Kinnard, Roy; Crnkovich, Tony (2017). Italian Sword and Sandal Films, 1908-1990. McFarland. ISBN 978-1476662916.
