= La Collectionneuse =

- Theatrical release poster
- Directed by: Éric Rohmer
- Written by: Éric Rohmer
- Produced by: Georges de Beauregard; Barbet Schroeder
- Starring: Haydée Politoff; Patrick Bauchau; Daniel Pommereulle
- Cinematography: Néstor Almendros
- Edited by: Jacky Raynal (as Jacquie Raynal)
- Music by: Giorgio Gomelsky; The Blossom Toes
- Production companies: Les Films du Losange; Rome-Paris Films
- Distributed by: Images Distribution
- Release date: 2 March 1967 (France)
- Running time: 83 minutes
- Country: France
- Language: French

La Collectionneuse (The Collector) is a 1967 French comedy-drama film directed by Éric Rohmer. The fourth entry in his Six Moral Tales series, it is his first film in colour.

Set on the south coast of France in August, it portrays the shifting relationships between four very different characters who, as in the comedies of Marivaux, play games of love and chance. The girl, who seduces two of the men and resists the third, is called the collectionneuse.

The film won the Silver Bear Extraordinary Jury Prize at the 17th Berlin International Film Festival. It is often considered one of Rohmer's best films.

== Plot ==
On a summer day at the house of Rodolphe, a rich friend, Adrien and his fiancée part on strained terms. She has to go and work for five weeks in London, while he chooses to spend the time at a house Rodolphe has rented near Saint-Tropez. Also there will be another old friend, Daniel, and the two men can just relax by reading and swimming.

When he gets there, Daniel warns him that unfortunately there is a third occupant. This is Haydée, whom Rodolphe has bedded and who now brings a different boy back each night. The two friends unite in banning any more boys and gating her, while bullying the decade younger Haydée by branding her a little collectionneuse, a collector of men. After sulking a while, Adrien turns his charms on Haydée. While he admits to her that he likes her greatly, he says his moral code will not allow him to sleep with her, so he tells her to seduce easier prey in the shape of Daniel. The two sleep together for a while, but the fastidious Daniel turns against her and, after insulting her, leaves.

Adrien comforts the hurt girl and thinks of a new plan to interest her. He has brought with him a rare Chinese vase to deliver to a rich but crass American collector called Sam, who is struck by Haydée. Sam invites the two to his villa to have dinner and stay the night. Adrien agrees with Haydée that he will plead he has business in the morning and will leave her there to seduce Sam. Going back to fetch her next evening, Sam turns against Adrien and insults him while flirting with Haydée, who then knocks over his precious new vase.

The two make their escape and, as they drive home, Adrien thinks she is good at heart and now that Daniel has gone he can spend the last week of his holiday in an enjoyable affair with her. Two men passing by in an Italian sports car recognise Haydée, who runs out to talk to them. When they invite her to join them in Italy, she takes her overnight bag out of Adrien's car. Adrien, after waiting a while, leaves her with them and returns to the empty villa alone.

He can now fulfill his aim of peacefully reading and swimming, but it is not what he wants any more. He picks up the phone to book a seat on the next plane to London.

== Cast ==
- Patrick Bauchau as Adrien
- Haydée Politoff as Haydée
- Daniel Pommereulle as Daniel
- Alain Jouffroy as Writer
- Mijanou Bardot as Carole
- Annik Morice as Carole's friend
- Dennis Berry as Charlie
- Seymour Hertzberg as Sam

== Production ==
Rohmer made the film with no budget and out of order while he waited for Jean-Louis Trintignant to be available for My Night at Maud's, and this structure possibly inspired the techniques and principles he and his cinematographer Nestor Almendros would return to in his later films: extensive rehearsal with the cast followed by very few takes; relying on natural light wherever possible, even for night scenes; "spying" fluid long shots to establish characters and their relationship together in a specific space. In his autobiography A Man with a Camera, Almendros admits that "the film had to have a 'natural' look, whether we wanted it to or not, because we had only five photoflood lamps". They used so little film that in "the laboratories they thought they were the rushes of a short (film)".

The character Sam was billed as Seymour Hertzberg but was in fact Eugene Archer, a former New York Times film reviewer. As well as providing the striking colour photography, Néstor Almendros appears in the film. The director and writer Donald Cammell had an uncredited role as well.

== Reception ==
La Collectionneuse holds a 75% approval rating on Rotten Tomatoes. In 2001, Philip Norman of The Guardian included the film in his list of the top 100 movies of the 20th century. In Jørgen Leth's 2003 film The Five Obstructions, the Danish director describes it as his favorite work by Rohmer, and he hired one of its stars, Patrick Bauchau, to appear in The Five Obstructions.

In 2012, Roger Ebert added the film to his "Great Movies" list.

== Bibliography ==
- Almendros, Nestor (1984), A Man With A Camera, Rachel Phillips Belash (translator), Farrar Straus & Giroux
