= The Private Lives of Adam and Eve =

1960 film by Albert Zugsmith, Mickey Rooney

- Directed by: Mickey Rooney; Albert Zugsmith
- Written by: Robert Hill
- Based on: story by George Kennett
- Produced by: Red Doff executive Albert Zugsmith
- Starring: Mickey Rooney; Mamie Van Doren; Fay Spain; Mel Tormé; Martin Milner; Tuesday Weld; Cecil Kellaway; Paul Anka
- Cinematography: Philip H. Lathrop
- Edited by: Eddie Broussard
- Music by: Van Alexander
- Production companies: Albert Zugsmith Productions; Fryman Enterprises; Famous Players
- Distributed by: Universal Pictures
- Release date: January 20, 1960 (United States)
- Running time: 86 minutes
- Country: United States
- Language: English

The Private Lives of Adam and Eve is a 1960 Spectacolor comedy film starring Mickey Rooney (who also co-directed), and Mamie Van Doren. It is an American B-movie in which the plot revolves around a modern couple who dream that they are Adam and Eve. Others of their acquaintance assume the roles of various characters from the Book of Genesis during the fantasy sequences.

== Plot ==
A bus heading toward Reno, Nevada, is being driven by Doc Bayles, whose passengers include a traveling salesman (Hal Sanders) and a runaway teen (Vangie Harper).

Feuding couples begin boarding. A waitress, Evie Simms, wants to go to Reno to divorce her husband Ad, having caught him kissing Lil Lewis, a neighbor. Lil wants a divorce from her own husband, casino boss Nick Lewis, who tries to catch up to the bus in a broken-down car belonging to Pinkie Parker, a beatnik.

A jealous Nick commandeers the bus when Doc briefly gets off and then inadvertently drives Ad off a cliff, nearly killing him. When a raging storm heads everyone's way, they take shelter in a church. Ad and Evie fall asleep and seem to have the same dream, that they are in the original Garden of Eden, facing temptations from the Devil that could affect the future of all mankind.

When they wake up, the storm has passed. The travelers pair off, Ad with Evie, and Lil with Nick, and Vangie with Pinkie, to see where the road takes them next.

== Cast ==
- Mickey Rooney as Nick Lewis / The Devil
- Mamie Van Doren as Evie Simms / Eve
- Fay Spain as Lil Lewis / Lilith
- Mel Tormé as Hal Sanders
- Martin Milner as Ad Simms / Adam
- Tuesday Weld as Vangie Harper
- Cecil Kellaway as Doc Bayles
- Paul Anka as Pinkie Parker
- Ziva Rodann as Passiona
- Theona Bryant as Sensuosa
- June Wilkinson as Saturday
- Phillipa Fallon as Desire
- Barbara Walden as Dancer
- Toni Covington as Devil's Familiar
- Nancy Root as Monday

== Production ==
In July 1957, Albert Zugsmith announced he would make a film about Adam and Eve as part of a multi-picture deal he had at MGM. George Peck was reported as working on the script. It was then reported that Richard Matheson would write a script based on a treatment by Robert Smith. Its working title was Flesh and the Devil.

The movie wound up not being made at MGM. It was a co-production between Famous Artists, the company of Albert Zugsmith, and Fryman, the company of Mickey Rooney and Red Doff; Universal distributed. Filming started on 7 July 1959.

Auditions were held for the seven dancers in the film. African American dancer Barbara Walden was the selected. She was told, however, that during the dance scenes she could not touch Rooney. Later, it was noted one of Walden's dance scenes was so “torrid” in the final film that it was cut from the US version, but kept for the European markets.

Shooting was temporarily suspended when Rooney came down with German measles. Shooting finished in August.

"I pick my titles to get 'em into theatres", said Zugsmith. "Thousands of exhibitors say amen to that."

Paul Anka released the title song as a single.

== Release ==
Universal planned to premiere the film simultaneously in all towns in the United States called "Paradise". However this was abandoned when it was discovered that there were only nine such towns; eight had a population of less than 500 and only two had movie theatres.

The National Legion of Decency gave the film a "Class C" or "condemned" rating, saying it was "blasphemous and sacrilegious" and resorts to "indecencies and pornography" that are "blatant violations of Judeo-Christian standards of modesty and decency."

The film was released nationally on 11 January 1961.

The Los Angeles Times said the cast was "professional" but that the script wasn't "too bright ... an unpleasant combination of scraps of professional piety and masses of suggestive buffoonery."
