= Patrick Bauchau =

Belgian actor

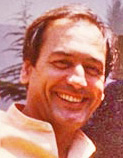
- Born: Patrick Nicolas Jean Sixte Ghislain Bauchau; 6 December 1938 (age 87); Brussels, Belgium
- Occupation: Actor
- Years active: 1963–present
- Spouse: Mijanou Bardot (m. 1962)
- Children: 1
- Relatives: Brigitte Bardot (sister-in-law)

Patrick Nicolas Jean Sixte Ghislain Bauchau (born 6 December 1938) is a Belgian actor best known for his roles in the films A View to a Kill, The Rapture and Panic Room. On television, he was a main cast member in the NBC series The Pretender and the HBO drama Carnivàle, as well as making notable guest appearances in series such as Columbo and House, M.D..

== Biography ==
=== Personal life ===
Patrick Bauchau was born in Brussels, Belgium, on 6 December 1938, the son of Mary (née Kozyrev), a Russian-born school administrator and publisher, and Henry Bauchau, a school administrator, lawyer, publisher, writer, and psychoanalyst who served as an officer in the Belgian Underground during World War II. He was raised in Belgium, Switzerland and England.

He attended Oxford University on an academic scholarship and speaks German, French, English, Spanish, Italian, and a little Russian, Portuguese and Dutch.

He is married to the French actress and writer Mijanou Bardot. They have a daughter and live in Los Angeles.

=== Career ===
Bauchau began his career in French New Wave cinema, including acting in two films by Éric Rohmer, La Carrière de Suzanne (1963) and La Collectionneuse (1967). He also participated in the New German Cinema in films like Wim Wenders' Der Stand der Dinge (1982).

Bauchau is better known for his roles in American television. Bauchau has starred in many different TV shows and movies, including Choose Me, A View to a Kill as Scarpine, The Pretender, Kindred: The Embraced, The Rapture, Clear and Present Danger, The Cell, Panic Room, Boy Culture, Carnivàle, 2012, Extraordinary Measures and Get the Gringo. In 1987, he was considered for the part of Captain Jean-Luc Picard in Star Trek: The Next Generation. In 1989 he starred as the murderer in Columbo episode "Murder: A Self Portrait". In 1992 he guest-starred on Murder, She Wrote episode "The Monte Carlo Murders". In 2004 he appeared in the Ray Charles biopic Ray as Dr. Hacker. In 2005, he appeared as a guest star on ABC's Alias, as well as on the Fox shows House and 24.

In 2007 Bauchau took the lead dramatic role in the biographical movie The Gray Man—a thriller which dramatised the crimes of the American sadomasochistic serial killer, rapist, and cannibal Albert Fish. In 2009, he appeared as a guest star on ABC's show Castle. For movies, he often performs the French dubbing of his characters himself, as he is a native French speaker. In 2011, Bauchau guest-starred on the episode "Eye for an Eye" of USA's Burn Notice.

== Filmography ==
Year	Title	Role	Notes
1963	La Carrière de Suzanne	Frank	Uncredited
1967	La collectionneuse	Adrien	
1968	Tuset Street	Jorge Artigas	
1980	Fun and Games for Everyone		
1980	Guns	Tony	
1982	Der Stand der Dinge	Friedrich Munro	
1982	Crystal Gazing	Husband	
1982	Enigma		
1983	Les îles	Edouard	
1983	Coup de foudre	Carlier	
1983	Premiers désirs	Jordan	
1984	Emmanuelle 4	Marc	
1984	La femme publique	Le père d'Ethel	
1984	Choose Me	Zack Antoine	
1984	Le voyage d'hiver	Adam	
1985	Phenomena	Inspector Rudolf Geiger	
1985	La Nuit porte-jarretelles		
1985	Christopher Columbus	Don Rodrigo	TV mini-series, 4 episodes
1985	A View to a Kill	Scarpine	
1985	Kane & Abel	Ludwik	TV mini-series, 1 episode
1985	Folie suisse	Federico	
1986	Lola	Robert	
1986	Conseil de famille	Octave, le frère	Uncredited
1986	Motten im Licht		
1987	Cross	Simon Leenhardt	
1987	Balada da Praia dos Cães	Capt. Dantas	
1987	Friendship's Death	Kubler	
1987	Arhangelos tou pathous	Gregoire	
1987	Accroche-coeur	Léo	
1988	Mount Royal	Andre Valeur	
1988	Le maître de musique	Prince Scotti	
1989	Erreur de jeunesse	Paul	
1989	Australia	André Gauthier	
1989	Comédie d'amour	Vollard	
1989	Visioni private	Boris	
1989	Columbo	Max Barsini	Episode: "Murder, a Self Portrait"
1991	Lo más natural	Pablo	
1991	Il nodo alla cravatta		
1991	The Rapture	Vic / Sharon's boyfriend	
1991	Terra Nova	Mr. Stal	
1991	Craven		
1991	Cómo levantar 1000 kilos		
1992	Robert's Movie	Robert	
1992	Chain of Desire	Jerald Buckley	
1992	Complicazioni nella notte		
1993	Havanera 1820	Mr. Johnson	
1993	Acting on Impulse	Yoram Sussman	
1993	And the Band Played On	Dr. Luc Montagnier	TV film
1994	Every Breath	Richard	
1994	Clear and Present Danger	Enrique Rojas	
1994	Dark Side of Genius	Sherman McPhee	
1994	The New Age	Jean Levy	
1994	Lisbon Story	Friedrich Monroe	
1995	The Interview	Padre Stephen Louis	
1996	Serpent's Lair	Sam	
1996	Enfants de salaud	Pierre-Yves	
1996	We Free Kings	Balthazar	
1996	Kindred: The Embraced	Archon Raine	8 episodes
1996–2000	The Pretender	Sydney	86 episodes
1998	Holy Man	Guy at the party who is hypnotised	Uncredited
1999	Twin Falls Idaho	Miles, a Doctor	
2000	The Cell	Lucien Baines	
2000	The Sculptress	Professor Giraud	
2001	The Pretender 2001	Sydney	TV movie
2001	The Pretender: Island of the Haunted	Sydney	TV movie
2001	The Beatnicks	Hank	
2001	Jackpot	Santa Claus / Voice of Sevon	
2002	Secretary	Dr. Twardon	
2002	Panic Room	Stephen Altman	
2002	C.E.O.	Monsieur de Reaumur	
2003	The Five Obstructions	Malini	
2003–2005	Carnivale (TV series)	Lodz	
2004	Promised Land	Jim Williamson	
2004	Ray	Dr. Hacker	
2005	Vampires: The Turning	Raines	
2005	Alias	Dr. Desantis	
2005	House	Dr. Rowan Chase	Season 1, episode 13 – "Cursed"
2006	Karla	Dr. Arnold	
2006	El amor y la ciudad		
2006	Boy Culture	Gregory Talbot	
2006	Suzanne	Frank	
2007	Thieves	Anticuario	
2007	The Memory Thief	Mr. Fisher	
2007	Chrysalis	Charles Becker	
2007	The Gray Man	Albert Fish	
2007	9 Lives of Mara	Documentarian	
2008	La velocità della luce	Rinaldo	
2008	La Possibilité d'une île	Le prophète	
2009	The Smell of Success	Mr. Rose	
2009	The Perfect Sleep	Nikolai	
2009	2012	Roland Picard	
2009	Extraordinary Measures	CEO Erich Loring	
2009	NUMB3RS	Jean Stephanois	"Sneakerhead"
2010	Glenn, the Flying Robot	Richard	
2010	Dharma Guns (La succession Starkov)	Le professeur Starkov	
2011	Burn Notice	Lucien Balan	Season 5, episode 9 – "Eye for an Eye"
2012	Get the Gringo	Surgeon	
2012	Satellite of Love	Alex	
2012	Ghost Soldiers	Kitcher	
2013	Big Ass Spider!	Dr. Lucas	
2013	Four Senses	Joseph	
2014	Amnesiac	Doctor	
2015	Every Thing Will Be Fine	Dad	
2015	Mega Shark vs. Kolossus	Dr. Sergie Abramov	
2015	The Girl King	René Descartes	
2015	Me and Kaminski	Prof. Megelbach	
