= What a Way to Go! =

1964 film by J. Lee Thompson

- Theatrical release poster
- Directed by: J. Lee Thompson
- Screenplay by: Betty Comden; Adolph Green
- Story by: Gwen Davis
- Produced by: Arthur P. Jacobs
- Starring: Shirley MacLaine; Paul Newman; Robert Mitchum; Dean Martin; Gene Kelly; Bob Cummings; Dick Van Dyke
- Cinematography: Leon Shamroy
- Edited by: Marjorie Fowler
- Music by: Nelson Riddle
- Production company: Apjac-Orchard Productions
- Distributed by: 20th Century-Fox
- Release date: May 14, 1964 (New York City)
- Running time: 111 minutes
- Country: United States
- Languages: English; French
- Budget: $3.7 million
- Box office: $11.1 million

What a Way to Go! is a 1964 American black comedy film directed by J. Lee Thompson and starring Shirley MacLaine, Paul Newman, Robert Mitchum, Dean Martin, Gene Kelly, Bob Cummings and Dick Van Dyke.

In the film, a wealthy widow wants to donate most of her fortune to the Internal Revenue Service. She narrates her life story to her psychiatrist. Each of her past husbands found wealth and success, but met with tragic deaths. She thinks she is cursed, and she would instead prefer a "simple life" inspired by the writings of Henry David Thoreau.

== Plot ==
In a dream-like pre-credit sequence, Louisa, a black-clad widow, descends a pink staircase inside a pink mansion. She is followed by pallbearers carrying a pink coffin. The pallbearers slip and drop the coffin, which slides down the stairs.

Louisa wants to give her $211 million to the U.S. government Internal Revenue Service, who believes it is an April Fools' Day joke. Sobbing to her unstable psychiatrist, Dr. Stephanson, Louisa tries to explain why she wants to give away her money, leading to a series of flashbacks, interspersed with fantasy sequences.

Louisa describes her childhood as a young, idealistic girl in a small town in Ohio. Her money-grubbing mother pushed Louisa to marry rich local business owner Leonard Crawley. Louisa instead marries Edgar Hopper, a poor shop owner who, inspired by Henry David Thoreau, prefers a simple life. They are happily poor until the jilted Leonard arrives and ridicules their rustic lifestyle, humiliating Edgar and motivating him to achieve success. Edgar transforms his small store into a tremendous empire, neglecting Louisa, ruining Crawley, and eventually overworking himself to an early death.

A grieving Louisa travels to Paris where she meets Larry Flint, an impoverished avant-garde artist. They fall in love, marry, and live a picturesque bohemian lifestyle. Larry invents a crane-like machine that converts eclectic sounds into paint strokes on canvas. One day, Louisa plays classical music that produces a beautiful painting, resulting in Larry's first major art sale. Larry builds larger cranes and sells many more paintings, making him a successful artist. One night, two petulant cranes turn on their creator and beat him to death.

Louisa, richer and more depressed, prepares to return to the United States. When she misses her flight, famed business tycoon Rod Anderson Jr. offers her a lift on his private jet. She initially finds him cold and calculating, but sees his softer side during the flight. They marry shortly afterward and live luxuriously in his Manhattan penthouse. Fearful of losing him like her first two husbands, Louisa convinces Rod to retire to a small farm similar to his childhood home. After sharing a jug with a few locals, an inebriated Rod mistakenly attempts to milk a bull, which kicks him through the barn wall, leaving Louisa widowed once again.

Now fantastically wealthy, Louisa wanders the country. In a small-town café, she meets Pinky Benson who, for over a decade, has performed nightly dressed as a clown. Management loves Pinky's corny musical act because it never distracts the customers from eating and drinking. The two fall in love and idyllically live aboard Pinky's run-down houseboat on the Hudson River. On Pinky's birthday, Louisa suggests he perform without his usual time-consuming clown make-up and costume so they will not be late for his party after the show. Without his clown getup, the customers notice that Pinky sings and dances beautifully. Virtually overnight, Pinky is a famous Hollywood star. He neglects Louisa and becomes so arrogant and self-centered that he has the entire mansion painted pink so fans will know it is his. At his film premiere, despite being warned, Pinky insists on greeting his excited fans. They become frenzied and trample Pinky to death.

After hearing Louisa's story, Dr. Stephanson proposes marriage, claiming to be the simple man she wants. She declines, which she declares is progress in her recovery. Stephanson accidentally presses the switch that raises the movable psychiatric couch about ten feet. Sitting on the edge, he falls off and is knocked unconscious, leaving Louisa stranded on top. The janitor enters and helps Louisa down. She is shocked it is Leonard Crawley, who lost everything after Edgar Hopper ruined his business. Leonard claims he is happy and credits Louisa and Thoreau for making his life "successful" because it is simple.

Louisa and Leonard marry and enjoy a bucolic life on a farm with their four children. Leonard, plowing a field, is distracted while reading Thoreau and apparently strikes oil after the tractor tire grinds into the ground. Louisa is distraught, believing her curse has struck again until oil company representatives arrive and say that Leonard punctured their pipeline. Leonard and Louisa rejoice, as they are still dirt-poor, but happy.

== Cast ==
- Shirley MacLaine as Louisa May Foster
- Paul Newman as Larry Flint
- Robert Mitchum as Rod Anderson Jr.
- Dean Martin as Leonard Crawley
- Gene Kelly as Pinky Benson
- Bob Cummings as Dr. Victor Stephanson
- Dick Van Dyke as Edgar Hopper
- Reginald Gardiner as mad painter brushing everything in Pinky's palace pink, including rabbits and Louisa
- Margaret Dumont as Mrs. Foster, Louisa's overbearing mother
- Lou Nova as Trentino, owner of the café where Louisa discovered Pinky Benson
- Fifi D'Orsay as Baroness who praises Larry Flint's paintings
- Maurice Marsac as René, Larry Flint's fellow Parisian painter and friend
- Wally Vernon as Hollywood agent visiting at Pinky's swimming pool
- Jane Wald as Polly, Larry Flint's fellow Parisian artist and friend who shoots paint from a shotgun
- Lenny Kent as Hollywood lawyer who explains Pinky Benson's will to Louisa

=== Uncredited (in order of appearance) ===
==== Dean Martin–Dick Van Dyke sequence/silent film spoof ====
- Dick Wilson as Driscoll, Crawley's store manager
- Marjorie Bennett as Mrs. Freeman, customer at Hopper's store
- Christopher Connelly as Ned, Hopper's store clerk
- Burt Mustin as lawyer reading Edgar Hopper's will to Louisa and her mother

==== Paul Newman sequence/foreign art film spoof ====
- Barbara Walden as one of Larry's next door neighbors.
- Marcel Hillaire as French lawyer reading Larry Flint's will to Louisa and René

==== Robert Mitchum sequence/Lush Budgett spoof ====
- Barbara Bouchet as bikini-clad girl on Rod Anderson's plane whom he asks, "What are you doing after the orgy?"
- Anthony Eustrel as Willard, Rod Anderson's valet on the flight to New York
- Peter Duchin as Peter, the pianist at the lavish cocktail party
- Tom Conway as Lord Kensington, who meets Louisa and Rod Anderson at a lavish cocktail party
- Queenie Leonard as Lady Kensington who, alongside her husband, meets Louisa and Rod
- Milton Frome as lawyer reading Rod Anderson's will to Louisa

==== Gene Kelly sequence/musical spoof ====
- Fred Aldrich as Herbert, patron who enters the café where Louisa just met Pinky Benson
- Arlene Harris as grey-haired café patron during Pinky's act, from whose table Pinky grabs salt
- Teri Garr as dancer in the Louisa/Pinky shipboard musical number
- Joel Grey as café patron enjoying Pinky's act
- Phil Arnold as Hollywood press and publicity agent visiting at Pinky's swimming pool
- Army Archerd as TV announcer at premiere of Pinky's 5 1/2-hour film Flaming Lips

==== Dean Martin sequence/end scene ====
- Pamelyn Ferdin as Geraldine, 4-year-old daughter of Louisa and Leonard Crawley

== Production ==
=== Development ===
Publicist Arthur Jacobs wanted to move into film production. One of his clients was Marilyn Monroe who said she would appear in a movie Jacobs produced if she liked the story. He found I Love Louisa based on a story by Gwen Davis about a woman with six husbands. In June 1962, Darryl F. Zanuck reportedly told Marilyn Monroe that she would make two films for 20th Century-Fox (which he was in the process of taking over again): a re-vived Something's Got to Give and What a Way to Go (the alternate title for I Love Louisa). Monroe's fee would be a million dollars for both films. In July, Monroe reportedly approved J. Lee Thompson as director after watching Tiger Bay and Northwest Frontier and she was going to meet Gene Kelly to discuss his being her co-star. Monroe died in August 1962.

In September 1962, Jacobs said that J. Lee Thompson, who was another client of his, would direct the film following The Mound Builders (which became Kings of the Sun). Jacobs wanted one of the "top three" stars in the world to play the lead, and "important names" to play the six husbands. No distributor had been signed. Later that month Thompson said he would make I Love Louisa with Elizabeth Taylor. In October the Los Angeles Times reported that the Mirisch Company, who had a long-term deal with Thompson, would finance. That month Betty Comden and Adolph Green signed to write the script. In December Thompson said Comden and Green wanted to call the movie What a Way to Go and that he hoped Frank Sinatra and Marcello Mastroianni to play husbands.

In January 1963, Thompson said he was confident about Frank Sinatra, Marlon Brando and David Niven playing husbands. In April 1963 Hedda Hopper reported that Steve McQueen would star in the film opposite Shirley MacLaine.

MacLaine was formally signed in July 1963. Also that month Jacobs announced he had signed a deal with 20th Century-Fox for the latter to finance and distribute. The production companies would be Jacob's Apjac and Thompson's Malibu Productions. The stars would be MacLaine, Dean Martin, Paul Newman, Robert Mitchum, Dick Van Dyke and Gene Kelly. Filming would start 8 August. Jacobs called the project "a sad comedy – a farout picture that has both loudness and pathos."

According to Mitchum, Frank Sinatra had wanted $500,000 for two weeks worth of work, so they offered the role to Mitchum instead. He agreed to do it because he liked working with MacLaine and Thompson (who had directed him in Cape Fear).

MacLaine said, "There is – I hope – pathos, anyway that's what I'm trying to do. It's funny for a girl to go through five husbands, getting wealthier with the death of each one – but it's sad, too, because she didn't want them to die and she hates money."

Gene Kelly originally had the rights to the story, intending to direct it, but relinquished it to Jacobs. Kelly agreed to appear in a single sequence. He choreographed the dance as well, calling it "a kind of gentle spoof of old movie musicals, though not as much of a parody, really, as Sing Along with Mitch."

Robert Mitchum's role was originally meant for Frank Sinatra, but Sinatra suddenly wanted more than several times the amount of money that the other male leads received, and the studio refused his demands. Gregory Peck was sought, but he was unavailable. The previous year, MacLaine had co-starred with Mitchum in Two for the Seesaw, and she recommended him to director J. Lee Thompson who passed the endorsement on to the studio.

Cummings signed in September 1963.

The budget was a reported $5 million.

=== Shooting ===
Except for one scene at Los Angeles Airport, the entire film was shot on the Fox backlot on 73 sets. Because of the limited availability of the stars, the movie was shot over 45 days, which was considered short for a movie of this scale.

The swimming pool set in the Pinky Benson sequences is the same set (with some minor redressing) used for Something's Got to Give.

MacLaine was quoted as saying that she was happy to work with "Edith Head with a $500,000 budget, 72 hairstyles to match the gowns, and a $3.5-million gem collection loaned by Harry Winston of New York. Pretty good perks, I'd say."

== Reception ==
=== Box office performance ===
What a Way to Go! premiered on May 12, 1964, and grossed $11,180,531 at the U.S. box office, earning $6.10 million in the United States.

According to Fox records, the film needed to earn $8.5 million in film rentals to break even and made $9.09 million, meaning it made a profit.

=== Film critics ===
Contemporary reviews were mixed, ranging from raves to pans. James Powers of the Hollywood Reporter called the film "hard to define, but easy to recommend...a dazzler". Variety labelled it a "big, gaudy, gimmicky comedy which continually promises more than it delivers by way of wit and/or bellylaffs." John Simon of The New Leader wrote "The mildest thing that can be said about this film is that it is an abomination". FilmInk said Cummings was "great fun".

=== Awards ===
What a Way to Go! was nominated for two Academy Awards for Best Art Direction (Jack Martin Smith, Ted Haworth, Walter M. Scott, Stuart A. Reiss) and Best Costume Design by Edith Head and Moss Mabry, a BAFTA Best Foreign Actress Award for Shirley MacLaine, and an American Cinema Editors Eddie Award for Best Editor for Marjorie Fowler. It won a Locarno Film Festival Award for Best Actor for Gene Kelly.
