= Dodie Heath =

American actress (1926–2023)

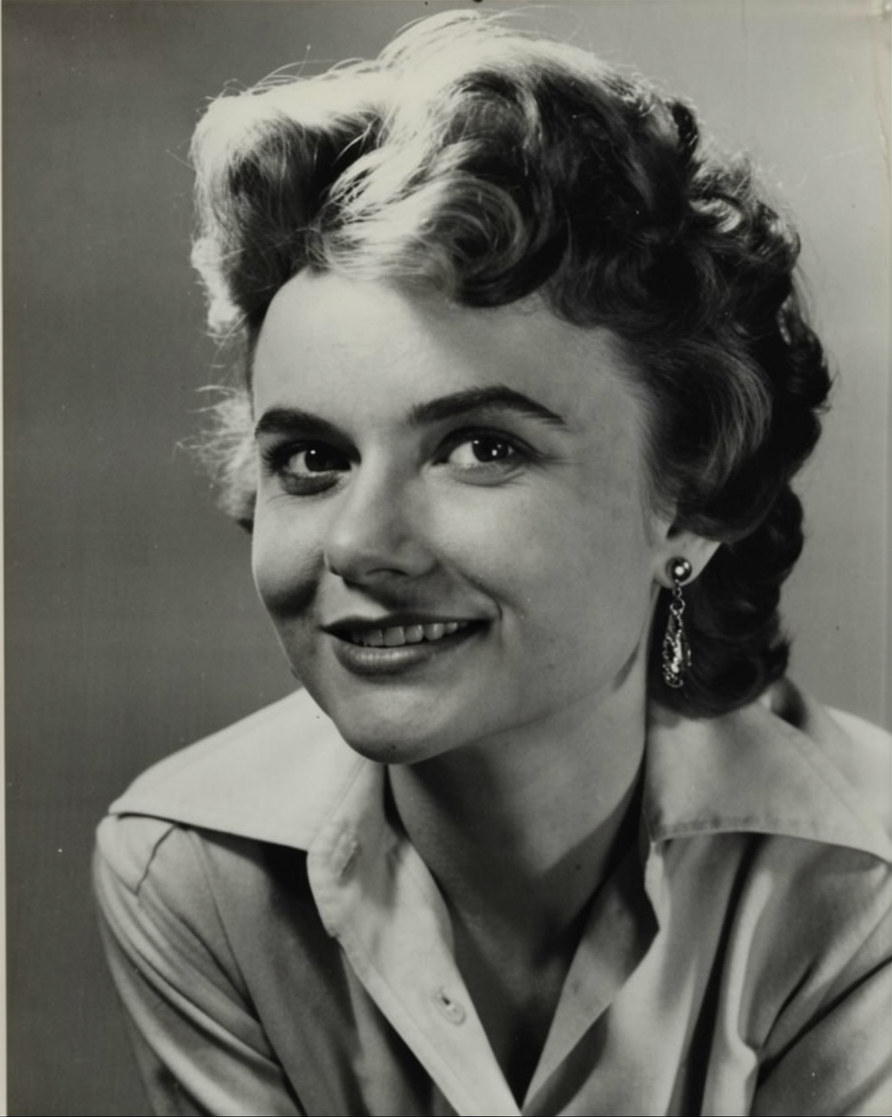
- Heath in 1955
- Born: Rowena Dolores Heath; August 3, 1926; Seattle, Washington, U.S.
- Died: June 24, 2023 (aged 96)
- Education: University of Washington School of Drama
- Occupation: Actress
- Years active: 1950–1974
- Spouses: Jack Cushingham (m. 1962; died 1985): Richard M. Soames

Rowena Dolores Heath (August 3, 1926 – June 24, 2023), also known as Dodie Heath and Dody Heath, was an American actress of stage, film, and television.

== Early life ==
Rowena Dolores Heath was born in Seattle, Washington, on August 3, 1926, to Wilfrid Paul Heath and Alice (Alexander) Heath. She had one sibling, an older brother. Her father was an inventor, who patented processes for using carbonization in the production of ice cream and butter. When Rowena was only six months old, her father sent a testimonial letter and photo of the infant to a goat milk company, praising the product she had been fed on since birth. The company printed both the photo and letter in a Chicago-area newspaper advertisement, preserving the details of Heath's birth and foreshadowing her life in the public eye.

Although his patents brought him a substantial income in the 1920s, Heath's father proved a poor investor and was reduced to designing homemade games and toys for local kids in the 1930s. By this time his daughter's first name had been dropped in favor of her middle name. The family relocated to Richmond Beach, Shoreline, Washington by 1940, their fortunes recovering as Heath's father turned to selling electronics, enabling him to provide Heath with a university education.

After graduating from the University of Washington School of Drama, Heath moved to Manhattan in July 1949, where she lived at the Rehearsal Club. This social club provided safe and inexpensive accommodations for some fifty aspiring actresses at a time. Heath lived here, helped by a $75 a month subsidy from her parents, until her second Broadway stage job enabled her to get her own apartment.

== Broadway stage ==
Heath first appeared on the Broadway stage as a replacement in the role of "Ensign Sue Yeager" for South Pacific during late 1950. She left in February 1951 when signed for a new musical, A Tree Grows in Brooklyn., which was based more on the 1945 screen adaption than the original novel. The new show did a two week tryout in Philadelphia, then moved to Broadway. As a member of the original cast Heath was with the show for its tryout and the entire opening run from April thru December 1951. Her character "Hildy", created for the musical, was only briefly in the first act of the play.

Her next stage role was as understudy for Janet Blair in a short-lived comedy by F. Hugh Herbert called A Girl Can Tell. The show ran for only sixty performances on Broadway, from October thru December 1953. Heath, however, left half way thru the run when she caught the eye of director Vincente Minnelli, who signed her for his next MGM film, Brigadoon.

Heath was cast as forward Scottish lass "Meg Brockie", which in the stage production was a secondary lead with two songs. MGM's budget reduced the part to a couple of comic scenes with Van Johnson's character, "Jeff". Whether or not Minnelli was personally interested in Heath as gossip columnists reported, he did give her a memorable film debut.

Following production of Brigadoon, Heath returned to the Broadway stage in Oh, Men! Oh, Women! She replaced the original female lead Barbara Baxley as "Mildred Turner" during July 1954, and continued in the role until the show closed in November 1954.

== Film and television ==
Heath did her first television acting role in January 1953, on an episode of the New York based CBS mystery series The Web. Television would become Heath's mainstay from 1959 thru 1962, as she made guest star appearances in twelve different series. Aside from one brief engagement during September 1961, she never returned to the stage. The Diary of Anne Frank (in which Heath played Miep Gies) began filming in March 1958. Newspapers reported in summer 1958 that she had given up her New York apartment and would concentrate on a film career going forward. She started work on her third film, Ask Any Girl, during September 1958.

After her first marriage in late 1962, Heath seemed to forgo television as well. She dropped out of professional casting directories after 1963, but continued to do films. Late 1963 saw her in Yugoslavia, making a German crime drama called Dog Eat Dog, a.k.a. When Strangers Meet. It wasn't released in the US until 1966, by which time she had two other films, Seconds and The Fortune Cookie on the big screen. Her role in the former was minor, while she was nearly invisible as a nun in the latter. Her last performance in any medium came eight years later in 1974, when she did a minor role in a strange horror film called Welcome to Arrow Beach. It played only in the southeastern US and quickly disappeared from theaters.

== Personal life ==
From 1954 to 1959, Heath was linked in gossip columns with circus owner John Ringling North, who was twenty five years older. A public engagement announcement was put out in May 1955 by her parents, which some sources have mistaken for a wedding notice. However, by August 1955 it was reported that Heath did not want to marry him and give up her career. North wrote a song for her called Dody which was published in summer 1956 by Frank Loesser's Frank Music Company and licensed under ASCAP. The couple had an on-again/off-again relationship and never did marry.

Heath married agent turned producer Jack Cushingham (1919-1985) in Rome, Italy in November 1962. They lived in the Bel Air neighborhood of Los Angeles and remained married until his death in 1985. Following his death, Heath married British producer Richard M. Soames. That union was later dissolved.

=== Death ===
Heath died on June 24, 2023, at the age of 96.

== Spelling variants ==
"Dody" and "Dodie" are both diminutives of Dolores. For all but two of her stage, film, and television performing credits, this article's subject was billed as "Dody Heath". This was also the name under which she was listed in professional casting directories. It was the name she used for international travel, as shown on passenger lists. The variant spelling "Dodie" can be traced back to syndicated newspaper columnist George Hamilton Combs Jr in March 1951.

== Stage performances ==
Listed by year of first performance
Year	Play	Role	Venue	Notes
1950	South Pacific	Ensign Sue Yaeger	Majestic Theater	Heath's Broadway debut was as a replacement in this long running musical
1951	A Tree Grows in Brooklyn	Hildy	Forrest Theatre; Alvin Theatre	Heath's performance drew mild praise from reviewers
1953	A Girl Can Tell	Jennifer Goodall (understudy)	Royale Theatre	Short-lived comedy ran from Oct-Dec; Heath left midway to film Brigadoon
1954	Oh, Men! Oh, Women!	Mildred Turner	Henry Miller's Theatre	Heath replaced Barbara Baxley from July through November 1954
1961	High Fidelity	Alice Blake	Walnut Street Theatre	Widely-panned comedy died after two weeks despite capable acting

== Filmography ==
Film (by year of first release)
Year	Title	Role	Notes
1954	Brigadoon	Meg Brockie	Gossip linked her romantically with director Vincente Minnelli before and during filming
1959	The Diary of Anne Frank	Miep Gies	Heath played the drab Dutch heroine who helped hide Frank
1959	Ask Any Girl	Terri Richards	
1964	Dog Eat Dog	Sandra Morelli	German-made crime drama wasn't released in the US until 1966
1966	Seconds	Sue Bushman	
1966	The Fortune Cookie	Nun	First, of only two, career credits (stage, film, tv) as "Dodie Heath"
1974	Welcome to Arrow Beach	Felice	Second, and last, career credit (stage, film, tv) as "Dodie Heath"

Television (in original broadcast order)
Year	Series	Episode	Role	Notes
1953	The Web	The Beast		Her first TV role, and the only one credited as "Dodie Heath"
1959	Alfred Hitchcock Presents	Season 4 Episode 35: "Touché"	Laura Fleming	Heath plays the female side of the eternal triangle
1959	Colt .45	Calamity	Calamity	An unlikely Calamity Jane takes a stage ride
1960	Lawman	The Hardcase	Beth Denning	Dodgers pitcher Don Drysdale guest stars with Heath
1960	The Untouchables	The Big Squeeze	Chicky Purcell	
1960	Overland Trail	Westbound Stage	Martha Cabel	
1960	The Twilight Zone	Long Live Walter Jameson	Susanna Kittridge	Cult classic is probably her best-known TV work
1960	The DuPont Show with June Allyson	The Dance Man	Naomi	Heath featured with stars Anne Baxter and Dean Stockwell
1960	Riverboat	The Water of Gorgeous Springs	Lovie Jennings	Minor role as a rural newlywed in a family feud
1961	Outlaws	The Waiting Game	Lela Dwyer	Filmed in late 1960 but not broadcast until January 1961
1961	Stagecoach West	The Butcher	Linda Barton	Contemporary newspaper listings have this episode as "El Carnicero"
1962	Hallmark Hall of Fame	Arsenic & Old Lace	Elaine Harper	Boris Karloff and Tony Randall star in this made-for-TV movie
1962	The Alfred Hitchcock Hour	Season 1 Episode 12: "Hangover"	Sandra Purvis	Grim story was Heath's third time co-starring with Tony Randall
1965	The Alfred Hitchcock Hour	Season 3 Episode 29: "Off Season"	Irma Dade	Heath played a sheriff's wife in the last episode of this show's ten year run.
