= Dog Eat Dog (1964 film) =

Einer frisst den anderen
- Original German film poster
- Directed by: Richard Cunha; Gustav Gavrin; Ray Nazarro; Albert Zugsmith
- Written by: Michael Elkins; Robert Hill
- Based on: When Strangers Meet; 1956 novel by Robert Bloomfield
- Produced by: Carl Szokoll
- Starring: Jayne Mansfield; Cameron Mitchell; Dodie Heath; Ivor Salter; Isa Miranda; Elisabeth Flickenschildt; Werner Peters; Pinkas Braun
- Cinematography: Riccardo Pallottini
- Edited by: Gene Ruggiero
- Music by: Carlo Savina
- Production companies: Ernst Neubach-Filmproduktion; Unione Cinematografica Internazionale; Michael Arthur Films
- Distributed by: Ajay Film Co.
- Release dates: 26 June 1964 (Germany); 17 December 1964 (Italy)
- Running time: 86 minutes
- Countries: West Germany; Italy; Liechtenstein
- Languages: German; English

Dog Eat Dog (released as Einer frisst den anderen in Germany) is a 1964 German crime drama film starring Jayne Mansfield, Cameron Mitchell, Dodie Heath, Ivor Salter, Isa Miranda, Elisabeth Flickenschildt, Werner Peters, and Pinkas Braun.

Filming occurred in late 1963 in Yugoslavia. Mansfield was pregnant with Mariska Hargitay during filming.

== Plot ==
Three robbers, Lylle Corbett, Dolph Kostis, and Darlene, steal one million dollars from a shipment on its way to the United States. But instead of sharing the loot with Lylle, Dolph decides to kill him without Darlene's (who likes them both) knowledge. When returning to Darlene (his wife) at the Hotel Americano's, Dolph informs her that Lylle is out of the picture and that she should forget about him. Before Dolph's return, Darelene was visited by hotel manager Livio Morelli, requesting her to turn down the volume on her radio. Spotting a one-thousand-dollar bill under the edge of the bed, Livio quickly concluded that they are the robbers he heard about on the radio.

Dolph and Darlene make a get-away on a rental boat. They are unaware that the hotel manager's innocent looking sister, Sandra, is in the back of the boat and has planted a bomb to kill the pair. She wants the money for herself and her brother. Lylle, who turns out to be very much alive, is also on board.

Lylle takes everybody hostage before they arrive on a supposedly "deserted" island. However, the island is not entirely deserted; Lady Xenia has retired here to spend her final days in peace, accompanied by her butler Jannis. Also arriving on the island is hotel manager Livio, who has left his "girlfriend", Madame Benoit, at the hotel to take care of the police detective, who has been asking questions about the robbers. Dolph, Lylle and Darlene are unaware that everyone on the island knows that they are the robbers and that they all want the money.

After a while an unknown killer starts eliminating people on the island. Lylle suspects the killer to be the holder of the one million dollars or a person looking for it. After Dolph dies, followed by Livio and Jannis, Lylle goes insane searching for the million. Lylle eventually finds out that innocent looking Sandra is the killer and is in possession of the money. Fighting over the money, Lylle and Sandra fall off a cliff and die. Darlene, now the last woman standing, drowns herself as the police are arriving on the island.

== Cast ==
- Jayne Mansfield as Darlene/Mrs. Smithopolis (voiced by Carolyn De Fonseca)
- Cameron Mitchell as Lylle Corbett (voiced by Dan Sturkie)
- Dodie Heath as Sandra Morelli (billed as: "Dody Heath")
- Ivor Salter as Dolph Kostis/Mr. Smithopolis
- Isa Miranda as Madame Benoit
- Elisabeth Flickenschildt as Lady Xenia
- Werner Peters as Jannis, Xenia's butler
- Pinkas Braun as Livio Morelli
- Robert Gardett as Police Detective Gino
- Ines Taddio as hotel singer
- Siegfried Lowitz as bank guard (scenes deleted)
- Aldo Camarda as hotel barman

== Selected release dates ==
- West Germany – June 26, 1964
- Italy – December 17, 1964
- United Kingdom – June 13, 1965
- United States – July 13, 1966

== Alternative titles ==
- La môme aux dollars – Belgium
- An Act of Violence – International (pre-release title)
- Dog Eat Dog! – United States
- Dollars Girl – Belgium (dubbed version)
- L'ora di uccidere – Italy
- When Strangers Meet – United Kingdom
- La morte vestita di dollari – Italy (reissue title)
- Estranho Encontro – Portugal (dubbed version)
- O thanatos itan ntymenos me dollaria – Greece

== Publicity promotion ==
It has been said that Jayne Mansfield's name was mentioned first, on the posters, in order to get the film some good publicity. However, in the film's opening credits, Mansfield is billed last; as: "and Jayne Mansfield as Darlene"; she was also billed this way in most of the film's movie trailers. Even though Mansfield was capitalized as the movie's star, she was more of a supporting character.

== Background ==
Jayne Mansfield called the film: "The best role of my career." American audiences wanted to know where this role was, for Einer frisst den anderen was not released to American theaters until two years after its official German release, in 1964. When released in the U.S.. it was released as Dog Eat Dog!, and flopped as it did everywhere else. Today the feature carries on a cult gathering, as a forever "gold-digging" classic.
