= Ramuntcho (1959 film) =

- Directed by: Pierre Schoendoerffer
- Written by: Jean Lartéguy; Pierre Loti (novel); Pierre Schoendoerffer
- Produced by: Georges de Beauregard
- Starring: François Guérin; Mijanou Bardot; Gaby Morlay
- Cinematography: Raoul Coutard
- Edited by: Michelle David
- Music by: Louiguy
- Production company: Films Georges de Beauregard
- Distributed by: Filmonde
- Release date: 4 February 1959
- Running time: 90 minutes
- Country: France
- Language: French

Ramuntcho is a 1959 French drama film directed by Pierre Schoendoerffer and starring François Guérin, Mijanou Bardot and Gaby Morlay. It is based on Pierre Loti's 1897 novel of the same title.

== Cast ==
- François Guérin as Ramuntcho
- Mijanou Bardot as Gracieuse
- Gaby Morlay as Dolorès
- Roger Hanin as Itchoa
- Albert Dinan as Baptistin
- Marie Glory as Franchita
- Moustache as L'aubergiste
- Georges Géret as Arrochkoa
- Colette Régis as La supériere
- Evelyne Ker as Pantchika
- Simone Vannier

== Bibliography ==
- Dayna Oscherwitz & MaryEllen Higgins. The A to Z of French Cinema. Scarecrow Press, 2009.
