= Female on the Beach =

1955 film by Joseph Pevney

- Film poster by Reynold Brown
- Directed by: Joseph Pevney
- Screenplay by: Robert Hill; Richard Alan Simmons
- Based on: the play The Besieged Heart by Robert Hill
- Produced by: Albert Zugsmith
- Starring: Joan Crawford; Jeff Chandler
- Cinematography: Charles Lang
- Edited by: Russell Schoengarth
- Music by: Heinz Roemheld; Herman Stein (both not credited)
- Production company: Universal Pictures
- Distributed by: Universal Pictures
- Release date: August 19, 1955 (New York City)
- Running time: 97 minutes
- Country: United States
- Language: English

Female on the Beach is a 1955 American film noir crime-drama directed by Joseph Pevney starring Joan Crawford and Jeff Chandler in a story about a widow and her beach bum lover. The screenplay by Robert Hill and Richard Alan Simmons is based on the play The Besieged Heart by Robert Hill. The film was produced by Albert Zugsmith.

== Plot ==
An older woman, Queenie, frets to her husband, Osbert Sorenson, about calling the police. The husband unplugs the ringing phone, and a woman can be heard sobbing and yelling from the other room. The couple come inside to find Drummy, and discuss whether or not they should call the police. Drummy takes a shot of liquor and storms out of the double doors of the patio. The couple runs into another room as the distraught woman, Eloise Crandall, emerges from the bedroom.

As she drunkenly stumbles through the living room, Eloise calls for Drummy while finishing her glass, sputtering “I’m sorry, Drummy!” Eloise suddenly bursts out onto the patio shouting his name, screams, and falls to her death out of our view. Her body is seen sprawled on the sand with her broken glass lying next to her.

The next day, two police officers are seen looking at the broken glass and notice a boat parked at the dock connected to the house. They see a blonde woman removing clothing from the now broken wooden railing. The doorbell rings, and the woman welcomes Mrs. Lynn Markham into the home. Amy Rawlinson, introduces herself as the real estate agent and states the house was rented at Mr. Markham's request. Amy mentions they were not expecting her so soon, as the previous tenant, Mrs. Crandall, left the night before. and Amy says she was a good tenant, describing her as a “quiet little old lady. Very nice.”

Amy gives Mrs. Markham a tour, noting that Mr. Markham was fond of the house and that it was a shame Mrs. Markham didn't live there. From the patio they observe the boat, about which Mrs. Markham inquires, “Is that mine too?” Amy says the boat belongs to a neighbor, Drummond “Drummy” Hall. Mrs. Markham asks Amy to request that he move it. The two observe the police measuring the body print on the beach. Amy dismisses this, stating they must be doing ‘something related to the government’.

Mrs. Markham notes items belonging to a man around the house, and asks Amy to collect these items and return them to Drummy. She remarks, “I have such a nasty imagination. I’d like to be left alone.” Mrs. Markham states she intends to sell the house as she walks Amy out. Sensing her unease, Amy apologizes and states that Mrs. Crandall was not a good tenant, to which Lynn replies that she didn't believe her anyways.

Enjoying the sun on the patio, Mrs. Markham is approached by Lt. Galley of the port police, who informs her that Mrs. Crandall is dead due to falling off the patio. Lt. Galley says he knows all the rich people in the area and shares a plethora of facts about her, including that she was married 7 years ago, owns a gambling joint, and that her husband died a year ago. She shares that her greatest wish has always been to be alone. The officer hints at rumors that Mrs. Crandall committed suicide, but he thinks otherwise.

The next morning, Mrs. Markham is awoken to the sound of a boat revving. She shouts at Drummy to be quiet, who retorts that he is moving the boat as he was asked. Upon arriving in her kitchen, Markham is shocked to find Drummy is making breakfast. In between his questions, Mrs. Markham asks how Drummy got in the house. He asks if she might join him on a visit to an island, a proposal she is unimpressed with. As she asks Drummy for the key he has, the doorbell rings. A new officer at the door, Frankovitch, asks if they have the clothes from the dead woman. Drummy explains he has them at his home next door, finally relinquishing his key to Lynn.

Later, on the beach, Drummy tans while the Sorenson couple drinks bloody Mary's and talk about how they were “about to make a dollar” out of Mrs. Crandall before she died. The two pressure Drummy to make friends with the new tenant, suggesting they can marry him off to a new person who will “pass away as conveniently as Eloise did.”

That afternoon, Drummy comes upon Mrs. Markham tanning on the dock, and begins flirting and apologizing to her. She rejects his advances and returns home to find the realtor back inside, announcing she has found a buyer for the home. Mrs. Markham requests Amy's key, and insists that the buyer provide a deposit. She again requests that the boat be moved and the railing be fixed.

At another dock nearby, Drummy comes upon Amy, who pays for his gas and takes him for a ride on her boat. The two argue, with Amy upset that Drummy has lost interest in her after a drunken night of flirting. Drummy tells her to drop it and not to mention Eloise again. Distraught by his disinterest, she attempts to drive the boat into a rock jetty, which Drummy narrowly diverts by grabbing the steering wheel. When she remarks that he hates women, he says “I don’t hate women, I just hate the way they are.” A large upside-down Y-shaped scar is seen behind Drummy's right ear.

Lynn sees Drummy that evening working on his boat. She follows him into the boat and notices photos of Osbert & Queenie Sorenson on the wall. He explains that used to work as a fisherman with his partner, Pete Gomez, but ran out of money after a few years. His aunt and uncle, the Sorensons, now provide him a place to sleep and some money for his time with Mrs. Crandall, who wanted to marry him. Drummy and Mrs. Markham share a passionate kiss, after which Mrs. Markham remarks that she wishes she could afford him, and insists he keeps his boat at the dock for the time being while he finds a replacement fuel pump.

Back at the house, Lynn is surprised to again see Lt. Galley smoking and waiting for her. The Lt. expresses concern for her and tells her to be careful around Drummy. Next door, The Sorensons spy on Mrs. Markham, again urging Drummy to try again to make friends with her. Drummy repeatedly stabs an apple with a shark hook. Queenie calls Mrs. Markham and invites her over for dinner, which she obliges.

While going to stoke the fire, Mrs. Markham discovers a secret cutout in the fireplace, which contains the diary of Eloise Crandall. She is intrigued and begins reading it, reading about Drummy's various attempts to charm Eloise and her love for him. Eloise's journal reveals she gave over $2400 to the Sorensons, not including gambling money, and that Drummy abruptly stopped visiting and calling. She begged Drummy to come with her to Los Angeles and accused him of using her for her money. In her last entry on Sept 22nd, she writes that Drummy is supposed to come over and oscillates between love and hate for him. Mrs. Markham throws the diary into the fire and pours a drink, when Drummy suddenly bursts into the room dressed in a dinner jacket.

Drummy reminds her they have a date, and Lynn is visibly shaken. Drummy says he canceled on the Sorensons and intends to take her out himself. She agrees and goes to get dressed in her room, while Drummy answers the door. The Sorensons burst in, and Lynn emerges disgruntled.

The couple insists they were eager to meet her, and Lynn makes it clear they are not welcome to stay. Lynn explains she is familiar with the tricks of gamblers and the couple, offended, leave. Lynn throws a drink at Drummy, accusing him of being a fraud and scam artist and recites phrases from the diary that he said to both she and Eloise. She again insists she is not interested in him, and Drummy grabs her, and she bites his hand. Lynn runs out to the patio and down the stairs, where Drummy continues to try to make advances on her. She falls on the beach and Drummy rips her dress off. The scene ends with the two kissing.

The following morning Mrs. Markham hears a boat from her room, but Drummy's boat is gone. She goes into the living room to find the maid, Mrs. Murchison cleaning the house. She gives Lynn a pair of cufflinks and a tie she found around the house. Next door, Queenie again pressures Drummy to call Mrs. Markham.

Walking home, Lynn finds Drummy's shark hook on her stairwell. The Lt. appears and says a lone female on the beach is a target for the criminals in the area. He says someone reported a disturbance on the beach, and says he will wait until he hears her get inside safely.

Over the next several days, Mrs. Markham is seen in a deteriorating state, drinking and smoking heavily and waiting anxiously by the phone. She hears a disturbance inside and finds the patio doors have been left open, the locks broken, banging in the wind. Amy arrives with a check from the new buyer, when Mrs. Markham gets a call from Drummy. She agrees to meet him and tells Amy to forget selling the house.

Drummy snorkels for lobsters while Lynn watches from the boat. Drummy shares he was in an orphanage as a child, and stays with his aunt and uncle because he is “different from other people” while fondling a knife. She notices the scar behind his ear and says she won't hurt him the way ‘she’ did. Drummy reveals it was his mother who gave him the scar just before she killed herself. Lynn shares her husband was much older when she met him, and that he gave and taught her everything. Back onshore, the police observe Drummy kissing and holding Lynn. They contemplate arresting him but agree “not yet”.

To their shock, the Sorensons discover Lynn agreed to marry Drummy and announces he is leaving. He leaves and the couple agrees to do something to prevent what happened with Eloise from happening again. Drummy and Lynn meet by the seaside, where Lynn says she wants to start over just the two of them. She brings him a present, the fuel pump Drummy needs for his boat, and he says he will take her anywhere she likes.

Lt. Gulley and Frankovitch arrive at the house, following a tip saying they should interview Drummond Hall about the murder of Eloise. Gulley hints that he suspects that the Sorenson's made the call to his office. He discovers that Mrs. Crandall paid them $1280 in seven weeks for gambling. He warns the couple not to leave.

The officers see Lynn and Drummy returning home and ask to come inside and speak to Drummy, who is reluctant to talk. Gulley states the Sorenson's mentioned seeing him shortly before Eloise's death. Drummy denies taking her money and says she was in love with him. Lynn berates the police for harassing her and tells them they are getting married and the two leave.

Amy comes to see Drummy working on his boat, upset after speaking to his aunt and uncle. She kisses him and says he won't forget him and she will wait for him.

Lynn awakens to Drummy fixing the broken patio railing. She remarks it is a lovely day for a wedding and puts on her dress for the day. Amy enters the home and asks how it feels to “win first prize”. Amy insults the marriage prospect between Lynn and Drummy and says he is using her for her money. Lynn tells Amy to “get over it” and she storms off.

Lynn and Drummy embrace after the wedding, and Drummy suggests going to Catalina on the boat immediately. Despite the rough weather, Lynn agrees. The Sorensons arrive to give their good wishes to the new couple and introduce their new driver, Roddy. Drummy tells Lynn he loves her for the first time.

Amy sees Lynn on the beach preparing to board the boat, and apologizes for speaking badly of Drummy earlier. She asks Lynn to tell Drummy she wishes him “every success”. Lynn removes a photo of Eloise from the boat and tosses it into the ocean. While unloading her suitcase, she discovers the new fuel pump Drummy was supposed to have installed in his boat. She recalls him saying they can spontaneously combust, and has a flashback to him saying she should be afraid of him when they had an argument on the beach.

Hearing Drummy call for her from the house, Lynn hides the fuel pump on the boat and goes inside. Drummy says she looks tired and pours her a drink which she intentionally spills on herself. In her room she dials the coast guard for weather information who says it is “worse”. She then dials the police, and the officer who answers says Lt. Gulley is out of office. Just as she asks him to call Mrs. Markham, Drummy bursts in.

Drummy clarifies that his aunt and uncle wanted him to marry her for her money. When she asks why he didn't tell her before, he says it is because he has fallen in love with her. She tells him what she found on the boat, insisting he had a plan to kill her just as Amy warned. The phone rings and Drummy answers and placates the officer. She smacks Drummy who falls to the floor, bleeding.

Lynn runs out of the house while Drummy again collapses to the floor. Desperate to flee, she runs to the boat while Drummy calls to her and climbs into the water. Drummy sees Amy on the beach who says Lynn has drowned herself. Amy reveals she switched the fuel pumps in an attempt to keep Drummy for herself, and that she also killed Eloise.

Lt. Gulley arrives and detains Amy, and tells Drummy he saw Lynn run toward the house. Trying to explain, Drummy throws a plant through the window to get inside, chasing her to the patio. Drummy saves her from nearly falling off the railing, seeing Amy being taken away by police. The two share a loving embrace and kiss as cheerful music plays.

== Cast ==
- Joan Crawford as Lynn Markham
- Jeff Chandler as Drummond Hall
- Jan Sterling as Amy Rawlinson
- Cecil Kellaway as Osbert Sorenson
- Judith Evelyn as Eloise Crandall
- Charles Drake as Police Lieutenant Galley
- Natalie Schafer as Queenie Sorenson
- Stuart Randall as Frankovitch
- Marjorie Bennett as Mrs. Murchison
- Romo Vincent as Pete Gomez
- Ed Fury as Roddy (uncredited)

== Production ==
The script was based on an unproduced play by Bob Hill, The Besieged Heart. Albert Zugsmith bought the rights and worked on the script with Bob Hill. He then sold the project to Universal who were looking for a vehicle for Joan Crawford. The studio also hired Zugsmith to produce, starting a relationship between him and Universal which lasted several years.

== Reception ==
=== Critical response ===
A review in Harrison's Reports said that the movie offered "a fairly interesting though somewhat seamy mixture of sex, murder and suspense."

Film critic Bosley Crowther gave the film a mixed review, writing "Their progress is rendered no more fetching by the inanities of a hackneyed script and the artificiality and pretentiousness of Miss Crawford's acting style. At the end, the guilty party is revealed in a ridiculous way. Jan Sterling, Cecil Kellaway and Natalie Schafer are the supporting players you may remotely suspect."

== See also ==
- List of American films of 1955
