= College Confidential (film) =

1960 film

- Directed by: Albert Zugsmith
- Written by: Irving Shulman; Albert Zugsmith
- Produced by: Albert Zugsmith
- Starring: Steve Allen; Mamie Van Doren; Jayne Meadows; Herbert Marshall
- Cinematography: Carl E. Guthrie
- Edited by: Edward Curtiss
- Music by: Dean Elliott
- Distributed by: Universal-International
- Release date: August 20, 1960
- Running time: 92 minutes
- Country: United States
- Language: English

College Confidential is a 1960 American B-movie drama directed by Albert Zugsmith and starring Steve Allen, Jayne Meadows and Mamie Van Doren.

== Plot ==
Sociology professor Steve McInter conducts a survey at Collins College about the lifestyles and sexual urges of the younger generation. The father of one of his students, Sally Blake, confronts McInter about the survey and finds that he is having an affair with a female student. Reporter Betty Duquesne receives an anonymous tip that McInter is corrupting the college students. McInter has a party at his house where a student film that has been spliced with a supposedly "pornographic" movie is shown. The professor is arrested and a trial is held where he is charged with corrupting the morals of minors, which attracts the attention of the media. After the trial, McInter attacks the "dirty-mindedness" of the town.

== Cast ==
- Steve Allen as Steve McInter
- Jayne Meadows as Betty Duquesne
- Mamie Van Doren as Sally Blake
- Rocky Marciano as Deputy Sheriff
- Mickey Shaughnessy as Sam Grover
- Cathy Crosby as Fay Grover
- Herbert Marshall as Professor Henry Addison
- Conway Twitty as Marvin
- Randy Sparks as Phil
- Pamela Mason as Edna Blake
- Elisha Cook, Jr. as Ted Blake
- Theona Bryant as Lois Addison

== Production ==
The film was an unofficial follow-up to High School Confidential from two years prior, although made for a different studio. Director Joe Dante, who spoofed said follow-up on the 1979 Ramones vehicle Rock 'n' Roll High School, asked Allen about making College Confidential at one point and the latter said that it was going to be progressive.

Randy Sparks performed two songs on the film: "College Confidential" and "Playmates", while Conway Twitty performed "College Confidential Ball".

== Release ==
Kino Lorber released College Confidential on Blu-ray March 18, 2025. The film had not been released prior to this on any home media formats.

== Reception ==
Howard Thompson of The New York Times thought the picture "best-described as punk", and wrote that "Steve Allen and Jayne Meadows are such personable, alert performers that it is truly painful to find them co-starring in a piece of movie claptrap like College Confidential." The students in the film were described as seemingly "even more adolescent, apparently never touch a book, continually grasp each other instead, or slither around mouthing a kind of steamy, beatnik jargon." The New York Herald Tribune said of the acting: "Earl Wilson and other members of the fourth estate show up in court to demonstrate their shortcomings as actors..."
