= Sex Kittens Go to College =

1960 film by Albert Zugsmith

- Theatrical release poster
- Directed by: Albert Zugsmith
- Written by: Robert Hill; Albert Zugsmith (Story)
- Produced by: Albert Zugsmith
- Starring: Mamie Van Doren; Tuesday Weld; Mijanou Bardot; Mickey Shaughnessy; Louis Nye
- Cinematography: Ellis W. Carter
- Edited by: William Austin
- Music by: Dean Elliott
- Distributed by: Allied Artists Pictures
- Release date: August 24, 1960
- Running time: 94 minutes / adult version 103 minutes
- Country: United States
- Language: English

Sex Kittens Go to College (a.k.a. The Beauty and the Robot) is a 1960 American comedy film by Allied Artists Pictures, produced and directed by Albert Zugsmith and starring Mamie Van Doren, Tuesday Weld, and Mijanou Bardot. The film was also released in its European print with an additional nine-minute dream sequence showcasing the robot Thinko with four striptease dancers.

== Plot ==
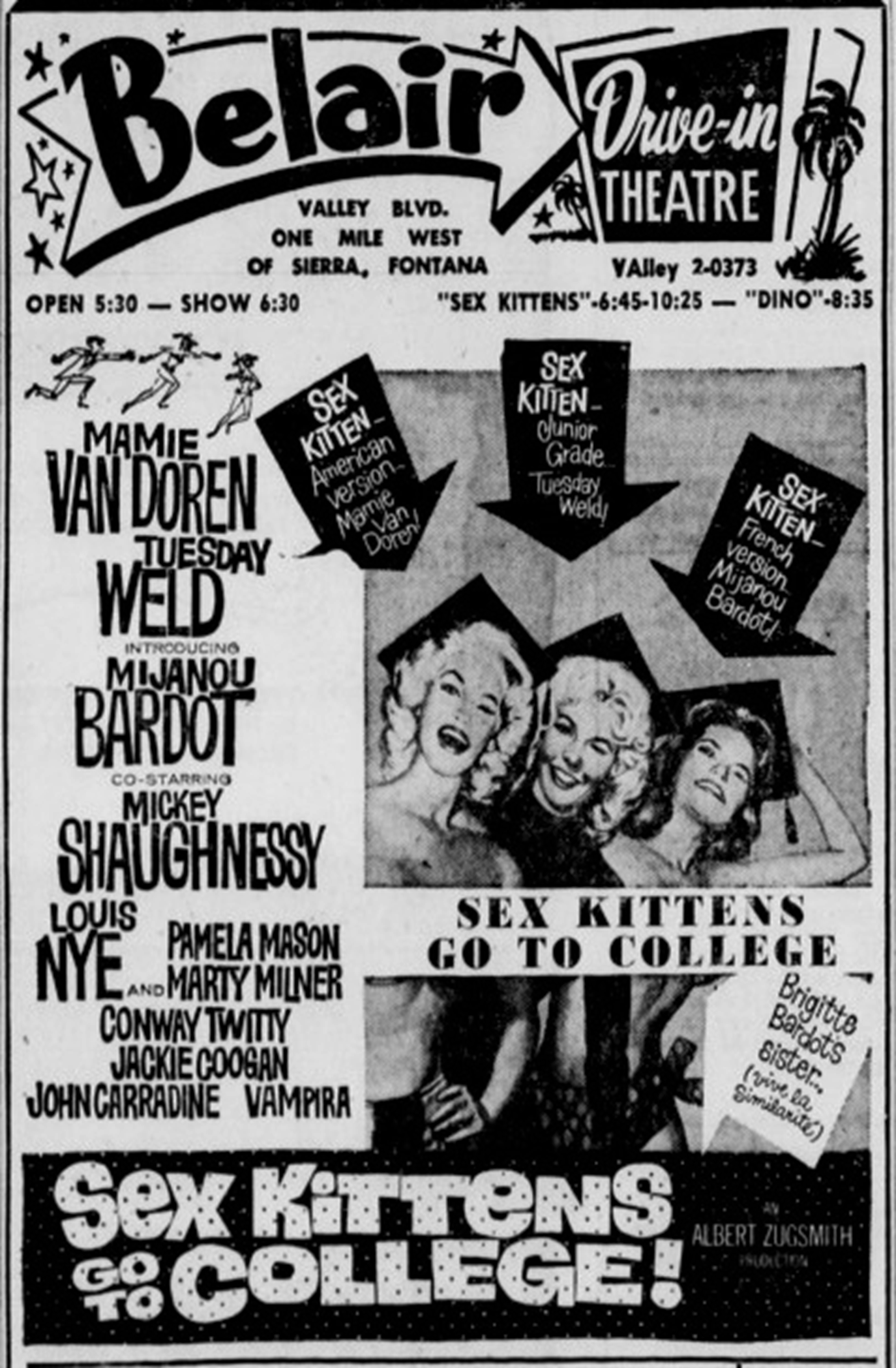
Drive-in advertisement from 1960

The Collins College's administrators are expecting new professor Dr. Mathilda West, who holds 13 academic degrees and speaks 18 languages.

Dr. West, a buxom blonde, has an effect on everybody, from public relations director George Barton, who is the boyfriend of jealous college dean Myrtle Carter, to football star Woo Woo Grabowski, who becomes nervous around beautiful women, including student Jody, who loves him.

A campus computer, affectionately known as Thinko, has a knack for knowing the future, including winning lottery numbers and race horses. A hoodlum, Legs Rafertino, comes looking for Thinko, thinking that it is a bookie, while foreign exchange student Suzanne tries to interview Legs for her thesis.

Barton exposes that Dr. West was once the stripper known as Tallahassee Tassel Tosser. The school's primary benefactor, Admiral Wildcat MacPherson, becomes concerned. Dr. West defends her former occupation and even performs a tassel demonstration that hypnotizes several of the men.

Woo Woo wins enough money on Thinko's gambling advice to marry Jody and buy a car. Myrtle dyes her hair blond and woos Wildcat MacPherson. Not wanting to stay where she is not wanted, Dr. West prepares to leave town, only to have Barton steal a fire engine and race to catch up with her.

== Cast ==
- Mamie Van Doren as Dr. Mathilda West
- Tuesday Weld as Jody
- Mijanou Bardot as Suzanne
- John Carradine as Professor Watts
- Jackie Coogan as Wildcat MacPherson
- Babe London as Miss Cadwallader
- Pamela Mason as Dr. Myrtle Carter
- Martin Milner as George Barton
- Louis Nye as Dr. Zorch
- Mickey Shaughnessy as Boomie
- Allan Drake as Legs Raffertino
- Conway Twitty as himself
- Vampira as Etta Toodie
- Norman Grabowski as Woo Woo Grabowski
- Charles Chaplin Jr. as Fire chief (Uncredited)
- Harold Lloyd Jr. as Policeman (Uncredited)

== Production ==
The director Albert Zugsmith came up with the story, which was fleshed out in a script by Robert Hill.

The film was originally titled Sex Pots Go to College. During production it was known as Teacher Was a Sexpot before it became Sex Kittens Go to College and The Beauty and the Robot.

The part of Thinko the robot was played by an actual robot, Elektro, built by Westinghouse in 1937.

Van Doren performed "Sex Pots Go to College", the original title of the film, and "Baby" in the film. Conway Twitty performed "Mamie's Song".

== Reception ==
The film has been described as a "supremely silly farce". The Motion Picture Guide said: "Some big names can't save this farce about beauty and brains...". Los Angeles Times wrote that "Mr. Chips, if he could have seen Sex Kittens Go to College, would be very grateful to have said good-bye to the world of education when he did." The Hollywood Reporter considered it "a vulgar and often double-meaning film, but not offensively so." Fantastic Movie Musings and Ramblings said, "Let's face it; with a title like Sex Kittens Go to College and a director like Albert Zugsmith, you won't be expecting anything along the lines of Citizen Kane."

== See also ==
- List of American films of 1960
