= Mijanou Bardot =

French actress and writer (born 1938)

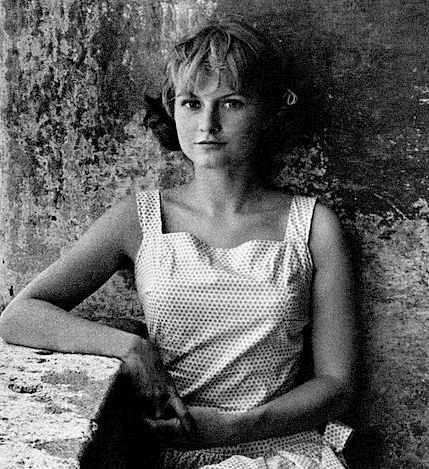
- Mijanou Bardot in 1958
- Born: Marie-Jeanne Bardot; 5 May 1938 (age 88); Paris, France
- Occupations: Actress, writer
- Years active: 1956–1968
- Spouse: Patrick Bauchau (m. 1962)
- Children: 1
- Relatives: Brigitte Bardot (sister)

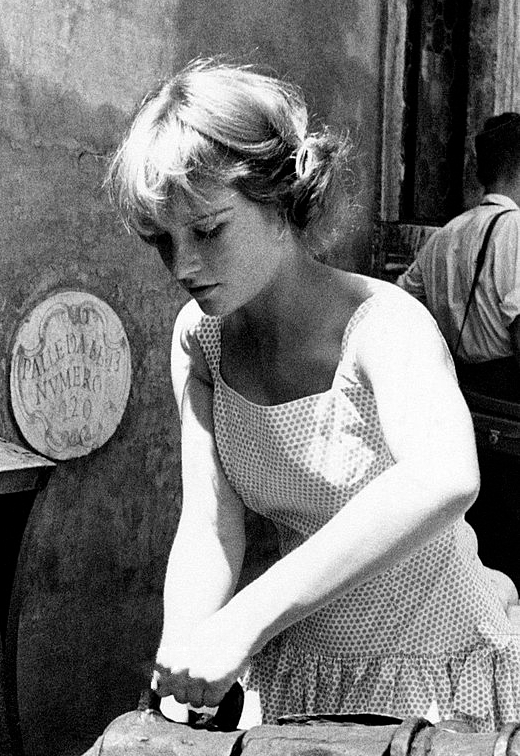
Bardot in 1958

Marie-Jeanne Bardot (French: [maʁi ʒan baʁdo]; born 5 May 1938), known professionally as Mijanou Bardot, is a French writer, businesswoman, and retired actress. She is the younger sister of Brigitte Bardot.

== Early life ==
Marie-Jeanne Bardot was born on 5 May 1938. Known from childhood as Mijanou, she was raised in a luxurious seven-bedroom apartment in the 16th arrondissement of Paris alongside her sister, Brigitte, four years her senior. The sisters' parents, Louis and Anne-Marie, raised the girls in a Catholic household and were strict on proper behavior, etiquette, clothing, and who they played with. If they broke rules, the punishments were harsh.

== Career ==
After Brigitte became a successful actress, Bardot wanted to do the same. Her first role, at age 18, was in Women's Club (1956).

Unlike her sister, Bardot shied away from sexually charged roles. While filming Ramuntcho (1959), when she was supposed to do a nude scene, she refused. "I don't expose myself," she told director Pierre Schoendoerffer. "Ask Brigitte to double me for this scene. She loves taking off her bra and will do it with pleasure. But I'm not BB." She starred in the 1960 film Sex Kittens Go to College with Mamie van Doren and Tuesday Weld.

Bardot's final film was After the Flood (1968). She retired from acting two years later. Speaking to Soir Magazine in 2009, she said, "I've always been shy in front of the cameras and I decided quite quickly to stop filmmaking because I felt bad on set: I felt like I hadn't done anything with my days." In a book by Dominique Cholant, she added, "I believed for a short while that everyone felt the same way, so I forced myself... Then when I realized that this wasn't the case for others, I quickly stopped."

After retiring, she moved to the United States, where she founded loft bed design company Espace Loggia in 1979. After enjoying success in the 1980s, the brand was sold to Philippe Malignac in 1992.

== Personal life ==
Bardot has been married to Belgian actor Patrick Bauchau since 1962. They costarred in the film La Collectionneuse (1967). They have one daughter, Camille, and reside in Los Angeles.

== Filmography ==
=== Film ===
Year	Original title	English title	Role	Notes
1956	Club de femmes	Women's Club	Micheline (as Mijanou)	
1957	Jusqu'au dernier	Until the Last One	Josiane	
1958	C'est la faute d'Adam	It's All Adam's Fault		
1958	Il pirata dello sparviero nero	The Pirate of the Black Hawk	Elena di Monteforte	
1958	Pecados Pagos com Sangue	Sins Paid with Blood		
1958	Une balle dans le canon	A Bullet in the Gun Barrel	Brigitte Geoffrian	
1959	Ramuntcho	—N/a	Gracieuse	
1960	Sex Kittens Go to College	—N/a	Suzanne	
1967	La Collectionneuse	The Collector	Carole(as Mijanou)	
1968	Después del diluvio	After the Flood	Patrcia	Also writer

=== Television ===
Year	Original title	English title	Role	Notes
1958	Cinépanorama	Cinepanorama	Self	Episode date: 3 July 1958
