= Theona Bryant =

American actress (1931–2021)

- Bryant in 1953
- Born: Theona Irene Pearce; May 23, 1931; Salisbury, Maryland, U.S.
- Died: February 28, 2021 (aged 89)
- Occupation: Actress
- Years active: 1952–1963

Theona Irene Pearce (May 23, 1931 – February 28, 2021) was an American film and television actress.

== Life and career ==
Bryant was born in Salisbury, Maryland, the daughter of Frank Wesley Pearce and Edith Louise. She was raised in Greensboro, North Carolina, and she attended college in North Carolina. She originally worked as a model. She began her screen career in 1952, appearing in the CBS television series The Jackie Gleason Show. In 1956, she appeared in the film The Power and the Prize.

Bryant in the 1950s

Later in her career, Bryant guest-starred in television programs including Maverick, Cheyenne, The Jack Benny Program, The Thin Man, The Untouchables, The Red Skelton Hour and Ben Casey. She also appeared in films such as The Miracle of the Hills (as Alison Wingate), Designing Woman, Around the World in 80 Days, The Private Lives of Adam and Eve, College Confidential and The Last Time I Saw Archie.

Bryant retired from acting in 1963, last appearing in the film Critic's Choice.

== Death ==
Bryant died of pneumonia on February 28, 2021, at the age of 89.
