= Violated! =

- Directed by: Albert Zugsmith
- Screenplay by: Albert Zugsmith; William Maron
- Story by: William Maron
- Produced by: Roger Gentry
- Starring: Susanne Suzan; Rene Bond; Billy Buzby; Rick Lutze; Britt Mari
- Distributed by: The Fanfare Corporation
- Release date: 1974
- Running time: 85 minutes
- Country: United States
- Language: English

Violated! is a 1974 rape and revenge film directed by Albert Zugsmith.

== Trivia ==
Opening shot is filmed at Laraine Day's Hollywood Walk of Fame star, with Eugene Roche, an actor, not in the film's cast, walking with a retail store shopping bag.

== Home media ==
The film, copyrighted 1973, previously lost, was restored by Vinegar Syndrome and included in the box set Vinegar Syndrome's Lost Picture Show, released in November 2023.
