= The Incredible Sex Revolution =

1965 film by Albert Zugsmith

- Directed by: Albert Zugsmith
- Release date: 1965
- Country: United States
- Language: English

The Incredible Sex Revolution is a 1965 film directed by Albert Zugsmith starring Hampton Fancher.
