= Albert Zugsmith =

Director, producer and screenwriter (1910–1993)

- Born: April 24, 1910; Atlantic City, New Jersey, U.S.
- Died: October 26, 1993 (aged 83); Woodland Hills, Los Angeles, U.S.
- Occupations: Director, producer, screenwriter, promoter, lawyer
- Years active: 1952–1974

Albert Zugsmith (April 24, 1910 – October 26, 1993) was an American film producer, film director and screenwriter who specialized in low-budget exploitation films through the 1950s and 1960s.

With a background in music promotion (Ted Weems, Paul Whiteman), public relations (one of his clients in Depression-era Chicago was Al Capone), journalism, and brokering communication properties (radio, newspaper, early television), Zugsmith became independently wealthy and began producing films at RKO during the Howard Hughes years. Zugsmith's most significant credits are a string of four genre masterpieces produced in the late 1950s, all for Universal Pictures: the science-fiction classic The Incredible Shrinking Man, Orson Welles' Touch of Evil, Douglas Sirk's Written on the Wind, and the camp exploitation films (produced for Metro-Goldwyn-Mayer) High School Confidential and The Girl in the Kremlin. An archive of some of his shooting scripts and screenplays are housed in the Special Collections department at the University of Iowa.

== Biography ==
Zugsmith was a journalist, publicist, and lawyer. In 1939 he moved in to brokering sales of communication properties like newspapers and radio and television stations; he was very successful, making up to $250 million worth of sales, and became a millionaire from his commissions. He was a film buff, and wanted to move into film producing.

=== National Comics lawsuit ===
In 1947, Zugsmith represented Jerry Siegel (with whom he served in World War II) and Joe Shuster in their lawsuit against National Comics. Siegel and Shuster were seeking $5 million and the return of the rights to their creation Superman. They ended up settling out of court for $100,000, and National retained the rights. Shuster would later speculate that Zugsmith had cut a deal with National without his clients' knowledge.

=== American Pictures Corporation ===
Zugsmith formed American Pictures Corporation, along with Peter Miller, Aubrey Wisberg and Jack Pollexfen. They planned to make six films a year for five years out of a fund of $3.5 million.

They did a three-picture deal with RKO to make Captive Women (1952), Sword of Venus (1953), and Port Sinister (1953). No film cost more than $100,000.

It was a film he made for Columbia that established him - Invasion, U.S.A. (1952), which earned profits of over a million dollars. He followed it with Paris Model (1953), and Top Banana (1954, starring Phil Silvers), both comedies.

=== Universal ===
Zugsmith's success saw him receive a long-term contract at Universal. While there he acted as a script doctor for several Universal-International films and produced Female on the Beach (1955), a melodrama with Joan Crawford and Jeff Chandler; The Square Jungle (1955), a boxing film with Tony Curtis; Raw Edge (1956), a Western with Yvonne de Carlo and Rory Calhoun; Red Sundown (1956), a Western with Calhoun, directed by Jack Arnold; and Star in the Dust (1956), another Western with John Agar and Mamie Van Doren, directed by Charles F. Haas.

Zugsmith had a big hit with Written on the Wind (1956) starring Rock Hudson, Robert Stack, Lauren Bacall and Dorothy Malone, directed by Douglas Sirk. Also popular was The Incredible Shrinking Man (1957) from the script and novel by Richard Matheson.

Zugmsith produced The Tattered Dress (1957) with Chandler, The Girl in the Kremlin (1957), and Slaughter on 10th Avenue (1957), a film noir.

He did The Tarnished Angels (1957) which reunited Sirk, Hudson, Stack and Malone, and Man in the Shadow (1957) with Chandler and Orson Welles, directed by Arnold. He did The Female Animal (1957) with Hedy Lamarr from his own story, directed by Harry Keller.

Zugsmith's next film was Touch of Evil (1958), which had Welles attached to play the villain; Charlton Heston agreed to star if Welles directed, which happened, although some additional scenes were directed by Harry Keller after Zugsmith left the studio.

=== MGM ===
Zugsmith says he left Universal because he was unhappy Edward Muhl had been made subservient to Al Daff He moved to MGM, where he signed a six-picture deal. The association started well with High School Confidential! (1958), starring Russ Tamblyn and Van Doren, and directed by Jack Arnold. It was a big hit.

He followed it with Night of the Quarter Moon (1958); The Beat Generation (1959), with Van Doren and Steve Cochran, co-written by Matheson, and directed by Haas; The Big Operator (1959) with Van Doren, Cochran and Mickey Rooney, directed by Haas; and Girls Town (1959) with Van Doren, also directed by Haas. All these lost money.

Zugsmith later said "after telling me that I would have decent budgets, MGM never gave me a decent budget while I was there.... I didn't get along very well with Mr Benny Thau.... I never cared for MGM. They gave me all kinds of curves: bad cameramen that happened to be under contract, and so on. I wasn't one of the 'clique'. They wouldn't back me up on the set or anything else."

Zugsmith turned director with The Private Lives of Adam and Eve (1960) which he filmed with Rooney, who also starred; Van Doren was in the cast. It was made independently outside MGM, for Universal.

"I pick my titles to get 'em into theatres", said Zugsmith. "Thousands of exhibitors say amen to that."

Back at MGM, Zugmsith produced Platinum High School (1960), with Rooney, directed by Haas.

=== Director ===
Zugsmith was billed as sole director for College Confidential (1960) starring Steve Allen, from a story by Zugsmith, at Universal.

He then bought stock in Allied Artists and directed three films for that company: Sex Kittens Go to College (1960) with Van Doren and Tuesday Weld; Dondi (1961), a children's film with David Janssen and Patti Page; and Confessions of an Opium Eater (1963) with Vincent Price. Zugsmith later said "Allied Artists was a very depressing period in my life. Maybe it showed in the films I made there. I was very depressed there. I didn't like it; I felt imprisoned; I had to get away."

He produced Zigzag (1963) in the Philippines, then produced and directed The Great Space Adventure (1963).

He produced Russ Meyer's Fanny Hill (1964), but the two men disliked working together. He directed some scenes of Dog Eat Dog (1964).

He wrote and directed The Incredible Sex Revolution (1966); directed Psychedelic Sexualis (1966), Movie Star, American Style or; LSD, I Hate You (1966) and The Chinese Room (1968); produced and wrote Sappho Darling (1968); and directed Two Roses and a Golden Rod (1969), The Very Friendly Neighbors (1969), and The Phantom Gunslinger (1970) with Troy Donahue.

In 1973, he said in an interview "many of the talents that I have developed or worked with have suffered by not continuing with me. And I have suffered by not continuing with them."

Zugsmith's last credit was directing Violated! (1975).

== Personal life ==
His older sister, Leane Zugsmith, was a leading proletarian novelist in the 1930s. He was married to Ruth (Feldman). Zugsmith had two daughters, Suzan and Patricia (Patty) and a son Michael. Sue became the Mayor of Claremont, California.

== Partial filmography ==
=== As producer only ===
- Invasion U.S.A. (1952)
- Paris Model (1953)
- Top Banana (1954)
- Female on the Beach (1955)
- Star in the Dust (1956)
- Written on the Wind (1956)
- The Incredible Shrinking Man (1957)
- The Girl in the Kremlin (1957)
- Touch of Evil (1958)
- The Tarnished Angels (1958)
- High School Confidential (1958)
- The Big Operator (1959)
- The Beat Generation (1959)
- Platinum High School (1960)

=== As director ===
- College Confidential (1960)
- Sex Kittens Go to College (1960)
- The Private Lives of Adam and Eve (1960)
- Dondi (1961)
- Confessions of an Opium Eater (1962)
- Fanny Hill (1964)
- Psychedelic Sexualis (1966)
- The Phantom Gunslinger (1970)

== Notes ==
- Flynn, Charles; McCarthy, Todd (1975). "Albert Zugmsith". In Flynn, Charles; McCarthy, Todd (eds.). Kings of the Bs : working within the Hollywood system : an anthology of film history and criticism. E. P. Dutton. pp. 412–420.
