= The Vampira Show =

American horror film television series

- Directed by: Hap Weyman
- Presented by: Vampira
- Country of origin: United States
- No. of seasons: 1
- No. of episodes: 50

Production
- Producer: Hunt Stromberg, Jr.
- Camera setup: RCA TK-30A
- Running time: 90 minutes

Original release
- Network: KABC-TV (ABC affiliate) (Los Angeles, California)
- Release: April 30, 1954 – April 2, 1955

The Vampira Show is an American television show featuring vintage horror films presented by horror host Vampira. The series aired on the Los Angeles ABC television affiliate KABC-TV from April 30, 1954, through April 2, 1955. The weekly series was produced and created by Hunt Stromberg, Jr., and featured the Vampira character created by Maila Nurmi.

Though the show was unseen outside of the Los Angeles area, The Vampira Show has become a cult classic, spawning fan clubs all over the world.

== Background ==
The costume of Nurmi's Vampira character was inspired by the spooky The New Yorker cartoons of Charles Addams, later adapted for the TV series The Addams Family in 1964. As Nurmi told Boxoffice in a 1994 interview, she had dressed as Addams' at-the-time nameless ghoul-woman to attend Lester Horton's annual Hollywood costume ball the Bal Caribe in 1953. Nurmi's ghoul woman beat out over 2,000 attendees to win the evening's prize for best costume where she drew the attention of Hunt Stromberg, Jr., a Hollywood producer. When Stromberg approached Nurmi about doing the character for television, Nurmi then re-imagined the character and costume as a buxom and glamorous single vampire instead of the mother of a family, and she named her creation Vampira. Nurmi told Boxoffice that her intention was to invent a unique creation of her own that was "campier and sexier" than the mute and flat-chested Addams character, in part to avoid plagiarizing Addams' intellectual property. Vampira was known to appear in broad daylight in full costume. Her husband Dean Riesner refused to appear in public with his wife in her Vampira costume.

Vampira's personality was based on elements of several silent film actresses, including Theda Bara and Gloria Swanson. The Vampira character was influenced by the Evil Queen from Walt Disney's Snow White and the Seven Dwarfs and from the Dragon Lady character in the Terry and the Pirates comic strip. The new costume was inspired by the artwork of John Willie featured in the fetish magazine Bizarre.

== Synopsis ==
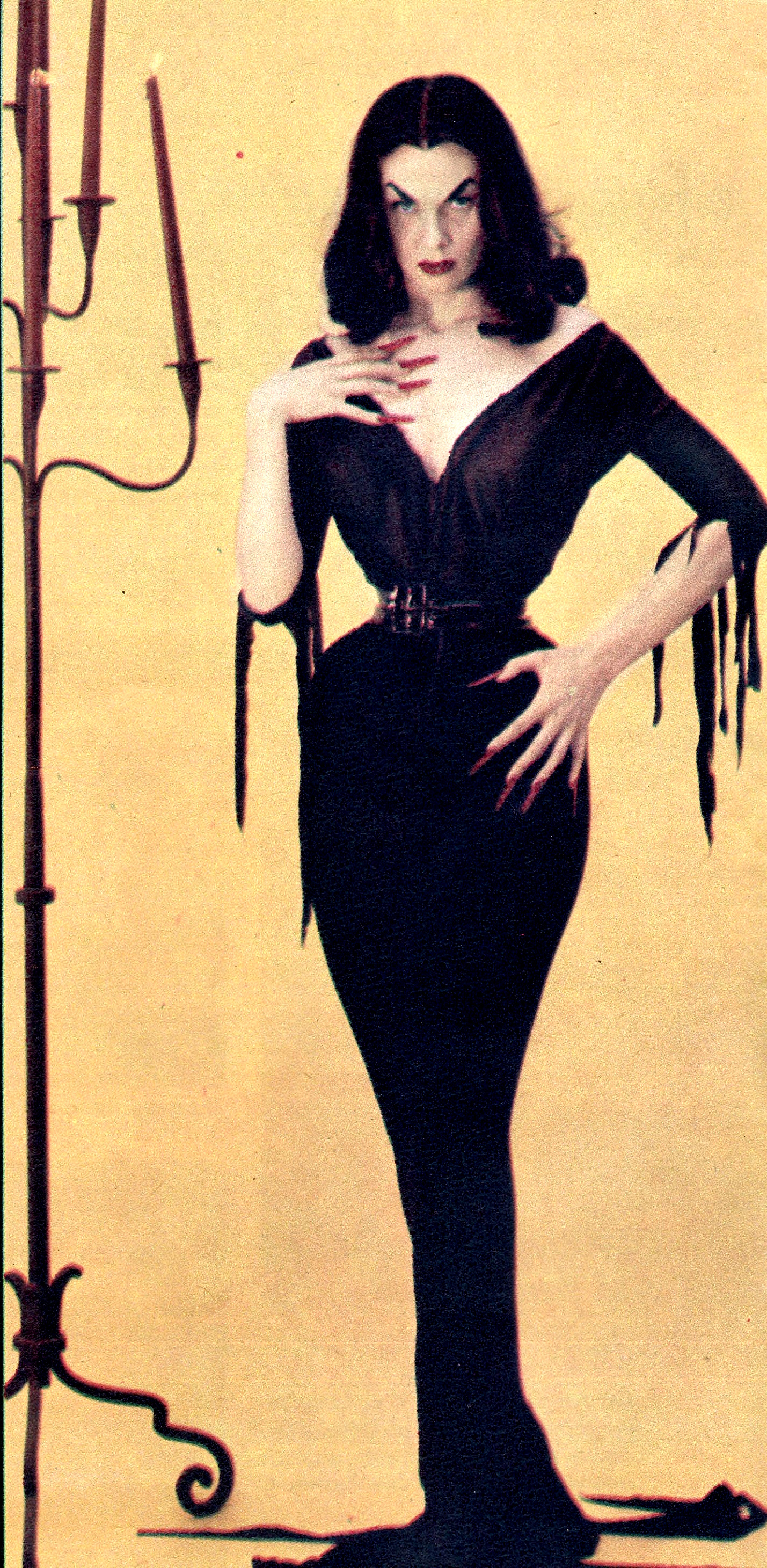
Nurmi in her Vampira costume

Each show began with the spectral image of the wasp-waisted Vampira gliding through knee-deep fog down a dark corridor toward the viewer. At the end of her trance-like walk she would suddenly let out a long, piercing scream as the camera zoomed in on her face. She would then smile and coyly remark, "Screaming relaxes me so." After that Nurmi would sit on a Victorian double-ended sofa decorated with skulls and introduce the movie of the night, sometimes pausing to play with her pet spider Rolo, talk with off-camera ghosts, torment her advertiser, Fletcher Jones, in amusing commercials, or drink a Vampira Cocktail at her poison bar. The show's theme music was from the Adagio movement in Music for Strings, Percussion and Celesta by Béla Bartók and excerpts from Uranus from The Planets by Gustav Holst. She closed off most episodes with her catchphrase: "This is Vampira, until next week, wishing you bad dreams, darling." Nurmi's salary for the show was $75 per week.

The show's concept of having a themed host introduce films was fresh at the time and had never been done before. In later years, stations all over the world would duplicate its format with similar hosts. The Vampira Show was seen in the Los Angeles area only but was featured in articles and photo spreads in Newsweek, TV Guide and Life within weeks of its first broadcast. The show and its hostess were an instant success and led to Nurmi's appearance on numerous 1950s television shows including The Red Skelton Show and Ed Sullivan's Toast of the Town.

In David J. Skal's book, The Monster Show, Skal revealed that James Dean, a friend of Maila's at the time before he became famous in films, appeared with his back to the camera in one Vampira episode, where she was dressed as a dominant schoolteacher and rapped his knuckles.

== Cancellation ==
Despite its popularity, the series was canceled in 1955 when Nurmi refused to sell her rights to the character to ABC. Nurmi revived the series for a short time in 1956 on KHJ-TV.

After the series' demise, Nurmi appeared in the cult film Plan 9 from Outer Space (1957), dressed as Vampira and credited under that name but out of character. Nurmi told Boxoffice that Wood's dialogue was so awful she sought and received permission to perform her entire role in a mute and spellbound manner she referred to as "Maila in an Alpha state." Nurmi also performed as Vampira in a Las Vegas stage show titled Come as You Are with Liberace.

== Revival and changes ==
In 1981, KHJ-TV hired Nurmi to recreate The Vampira Show. When Nurmi quit the project, a new character, Elvira (portrayed by Cassandra Peterson), replaced her. By 1982, Elvira's Movie Macabre was syndicated in over 80 markets across the United States. Nurmi later sued Peterson for copying the Vampira persona. However, the case was dismissed.

In a 1988 interview with Skip E. Lowe provoking Nurmi repeatedly for comments on Vampira vs. Elvira, Nurmi stated "There are at least 80 similarities. It's identical; it's my show." Later in the interview, again under provoking from Lowe, Nurmi stated, of Elvira, that "In February of '82 she proceeded to emulate my performance exactly and prior to that she didn't know exactly how to do Vampira, but then now she emulates every gesture." Lowe continued using this provoking approach to bring the conversation back to the Vampira vs. Elvira subject throughout the interview, even after the conversation had moved on to other topics several times.

== Episode status ==
The original Vampira Show was not aired outside the Los Angeles area and was broadcast live without being preserved as kinescopes for future airings. No footage of the show is known to exist, but in the 1990s a kinescope advertising the station's ability to draw clients to advertisers featuring Nurmi in character was discovered. The clips used in the kinescope were re-shot segments using a previous episode's script.

Scenes from the kinescope film were featured in the 1995 Finnish documentary about Nurmi, About Sex, Death and Taxes, and in the 2006 film Vampira: The Movie.

In 2007, the kinescope film of Nurmi in character was restored by Rerunmedia, whose previous work includes restoring footage from The Ed Sullivan Show and Dark Shadows. The restoration utilized the LiveFeed Video Imaging process developed exclusively for the restoration of kinescopes. The restoration was funded by Jove deRenzy and Coffin Case.

A reconstructed episode of The Vampira Show was released from the Vampira's Attic web site in October 2007. The release imitated a complete episode by using existing footage of the show combined with vintage commercials and a full-length feature film.

== In popular culture ==
In 1994, director Tim Burton cast actress Lisa Marie as Nurmi/Vampira for the film Ed Wood. The film also featured a short recreation of The Vampira Show.
