= Tomata du Plenty =

American singer and painter

David Xavier Harrigan, also Tomata du Plenty (May 28, 1948 – August 21, 2000), was an American singer of the late 1970s and early 1980s Los Angeles electropunk band The Screamers. He was also the founder of Seattle's counterculture troupe Ze Whiz Kidz. During the later part of his life he focused on painting.

== Early life ==
Tomata du Plenty was born as David Xavier Harrigan on May 28, 1948, in the state of New York, of Irish immigrant parents. His family moved to Montebello, California, when he was 9 years old, and Tomata ran away to Hollywood at the age of 15. In 1968 he hitchhiked to San Francisco, California, where he met members of the Cockettes, including Hibiscus. He appeared in one of the early shows of The Cockettes but soon moved to Seattle, where he formed his own theatre group, Ze Whiz Kidz.

== Early career ==
Tomata led Ze Whiz Kids, a troupe based on Seattle, Washington that blended counterculture comedy with drag theater during 1969–1972. The group staged nearly a hundred musical revues with a cast that featured performers like Satin Sheets, Co Co Ritz, Dyna Flo, Benny Whiplash, Michael Hautepants (costume designer Michael Murphy), Leah Vigeah, Valerie Allthetime DePonty (Valerie DePonty), Louise Lovely (Di Linge) and Cha Cha Samoa (Cha Davis, who died in 2019 after a long battle with cancer).

In the Fall of 1973, Tomata and Cockette founding member, Fayette Hauser moved to New York City to bring guerrilla comedy to CBGB and other East Village clubs, working with then-unknown bands like the Ramones and Blondie. "I used to do Pat Suzuki between their sets", he said. They were soon joined by fellow performers Gorilla Rose, Cockettes Sweet Pam Tent and John Flowers. In 1972 and 1973, Tomata and company staged two Palm Casino Revues at the Bouwerie Lane Theater. In between shows, he and Fayette found time to write a gossip column called "Hollywood Spit" for the Naked News, an adult newspaper, and together Fayette and Tomata also operated a vintage store on Mott St. Their clientele included the sculptor Louise Nevelson. The store had no name. Also at this time Fayette and Tomata worked with Chris Stein and Joseph Freeman on a video magazine also called "Hollywood Spit" with fellow performers Gorilla Rose and John Flowers for Public Access television. The show aired in New York and in Los Angeles.

Returning to Seattle in 1975, Tomata formed a band called The Tupperwares with Melba Toast (later Tommy Gear). The band re-formed later that year, in Los Angeles. In 1976 they included drummer K. K. Barrett and keyboardist David Brown, and a new name, The Screamers. Brown was later replaced by Paul Roessler. As much theater as rock band, The Screamers eschewed guitars and featured two keyboards, one drummer and assaultive lyrics mostly written and sung by Tomata. Their sound anticipated the electronic rock of the early 1980s. Their look—foot-high hair and ripped clothes—was achieved with the help of hair sprays, gels and a full-time stylist (Chloe Pappas).

== Late career ==
During 1977–1981 The Screamers were a notable L.A. punk band, and one of the city's leading club draws. They played consecutive sold-out performances at L.A.'s top music venues, including the Whisky a Go Go, the Starwood and the Roxy Theatre, but despite several offers never signed a record deal. The band's last performance, without keyboardist Gear, was at the Whisky a Go Go in 1981. Two years before MTV, it incorporated music video with live performances by Tomata, K.K., Paul Ambrose, Shari Penquin and the Fabulous Sheela. Much of the film was later used in a full-length feature, Population: 1, produced and directed by Dutch filmmaker Rene Daalder and featuring a cast of L.A. musicians and scene-makers, including a preschool Beck Hansen. Population: 1 was screened in 1986 at the Cannes International Film Festival and Seattle International Film Festival. In 1987 it was screened at the Chicago International Film Festival and was later released in Europe and Japan. In October 2008, Population: 1 was released on DVD in the United States and Canada.

Tomata was a prolific stage producer, playwright and lyricist who wrote scores of songs, plays, sketches, and musicales. He was fond of quoting an old review by Rex Reed, "No talent is not enough," but hundreds of avid fans disagreed. In 1985 he wrote and performed The Weird Live Show, a series of unconventional shows at the Anti-Club and LACE Gallery in Los Angeles.

In the late 1980s he directed a series of short films with Los Angeles filmmaker Kevin Kierer, including Mr. Baby and Pick Up on Olivera Street featuring Styles Caldwell. He coaxed 50s TV horror-movie hostess Vampira out of retirement, and featured her in several performances and films.

Tomata began his art career in 1983 with a one-man exhibit of watercolor portraits at the Zero One Gallery in Hollywood. Three years later, in 1986, his first paintings on canvas were exhibited at L.A.'s Cheap Racist Gallery at a show called Whores, Sluts and Tramps (at the opening party, guests appeared dressed as their favorite low-life heroes). In 1987, he won the L.A. Weekly's Best Set Design Award for his work on John Fleck's one-man stage show, I Got the He-Be She-Be's. He directed the Compulsive Players in a performance at L.A.'s MOCA that same year and exhibited at the Bye Bye Gallery with artist Diane Gamboa. An exhibit called "Knock Out!," featuring portraits of boxers, appeared in 1988 at the Zero One Gallery in Los Angeles. That same year he was the regular art critic on the cable television series, What's Bubbling Underground, and he guest lectured at the Fashion Institute of Los Angeles. In one of his last stage performances he appeared in The Loves of Edgar Allan Poe with Gronk, Fayette Hauser, Janis Siegel of The Manhattan Transfer and Styles Caldwell at L.A.'s Casa Confetti.

Tomata continued his painting career after moving to Miami's South Beach in 1989. His exhibits—in bars, restaurants, small galleries around the country and even laundromats—were often arranged around a single theme, saluting his favorite poets, TV stars, country/western singers and boxers. Tomata painted people he admired, from historical figures to friends from the punk world, in a style that was emotional, provocative and accessible. He was proud of his status as an outsider artist; he once observed he would rather sell 100 pictures for $25 than one picture for $2,500. In the mid-1990s he moved his studio to New Orleans, Louisiana. Several times a year he would hit the road for exhibits in California, New York and Florida. In January 1999 he appeared in a CNN interview, along with series of paintings featuring Lucille Ball, Elvis Presley and other pop-culture icons.

On August 21, 2000, while in San Francisco, Tomata died of cancer at the age of 52. His remains were cremated, and his ashes are interred at the Hollywood Forever Cemetery, in a niche in the Chapel Columbarium.

In 2012, Gordon W. Bailey, an art critic and champion of du Plenty, donated a number of du Plenty's portraits depicting boxers and entertainers to the Georgia Museum of Art in Athens, GA in honor of the founding members of R.E.M., Michael Stipe, Peter Buck, Mike Mills and Bill Berry. Bailey encouraged the museum to pay tribute to du Plenty and following his lead the museum organized the exhibition Boxers and Backbeats: Tomata du Plenty and the West Coast Punk Scene which ran from October 2014 until January 2015. The museum's pre-exhibition promotional efforts came to the attention of Carlos Iglesias, a founder of The Remainder Is Productions, and Helen Clarke. In the spring of 2014, Iglesias and Clarke, in close association with a number of du Plenty's friends and collaborators, staged the multi-media event Big Hair: The Life and Times of Tomata du Plenty at Art Share Los Angeles.
