= Maila Nurmi =

American actress and television personality (1922–2008)

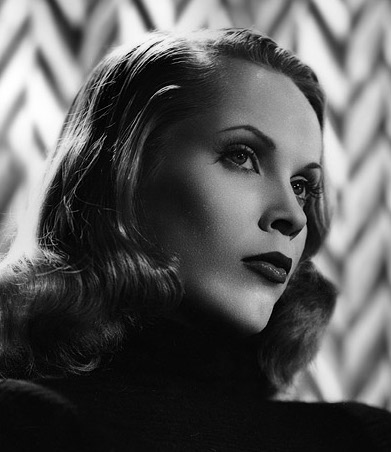
- Nurmi in 1947
- Born: Maila Elizabeth Syrjäniemi; December 11, 1922; Gloucester, Massachusetts, U.S. (Note: According to W. Scott Poole, Nurmi was in fact born in Gloucester, Massachusetts despite her claims of being born in Petsamo, Finland. Poole states the claim was made in order to "strengthen" her purported relation to Finnish Olympian runner Paavo Nurmi, a claim he also says is false (see Poole 2014, pp. 32–33).)
- Died: January 10, 2008 (aged 85); Los Angeles, California, U.S.
- Resting place: Hollywood Forever Cemetery
- Other names: Maila Niemi Nurmi; Maila Elizabeth Nurmimioni; Vampira
- Occupation: Actress
- Spouses: Dean Riesner (m. 1949) John Brinkley (m. 1958) Fabrizio Mioni (m. 1961; div. 1977)

Maila Elizabeth Syrjäniemi (December 11, 1922 – January 10, 2008), known professionally as Maila Nurmi, was an American actress best known for creating the camp 1950s character Vampira.

She was raised in Astoria, Oregon, where she worked in tuna and salmon canneries. She relocated to Los Angeles in 1940, with hopes of becoming an actress. After several minor film roles, she found success with her Vampira character, television's first horror host. Nurmi hosted her own series, The Vampira Show, from 1954 to 1955, on KABC-TV.

After the show's cancellation, she appeared in the 1959 cult film Plan 9 from Outer Space, directed by Ed Wood. She is also billed as Vampira, despite not playing the character, in the 1959 films The Beat Generation, where she plays a beatnik poet, and crime film The Big Operator. She was portrayed by Lisa Marie in Tim Burton's 1994 biopic, Ed Wood.

== Early life ==
Maila Nurmi was born to Onni Niemi (earlier Syrjäniemi), a Finnish immigrant, and Sophia Peterson, an American of Finnish descent. Her place of birth was at one time disputed: according to biographer W. Scott Poole in Vampira: Dark Goddess of Horror (2014), she was born in Gloucester, Massachusetts. During her career, she claimed to have been born in Petsamo, Finland, claiming she was the niece of Finnish athlete Paavo Nurmi, who began setting long-distance running world records in 1921, the year before her birth. Public U.S. immigration records show her father's immigration at Ellis Island in 1910. Additionally, Dana Gould claimed in a 2014 public interview that he had seen Nurmi's birth certificate, which listed her birthplace as Gloucester, Massachusetts. In her personal diary, Nurmi admitted the Petsamo story was fiction.

During her childhood, Nurmi relocated with her family from Massachusetts to Ashtabula, Ohio, before settling in Astoria, Oregon, a city on the Oregon Coast with a large Finnish community. Her father worked as a lecturer and editor; her mother also worked as a part-time journalist and translator to support the family. Nurmi graduated from Astoria High School in 1940.

== Career ==
=== Early work ===
Nurmi relocated to Los Angeles, California in 1940, and later to New York City, to pursue acting. She modeled for Alberto Vargas, Bernard of Hollywood, and Man Ray, and gained a foothold in the film industry with an uncredited role in Victor Saville's 1947 film, If Winter Comes.

She was fired in 1944 by Mae West from the cast of West's Broadway play, Catherine Was Great, because West feared she was being upstaged.

On Broadway, she gained much attention after appearing in the horror-themed midnight show Spook Scandals, in which she screamed, fainted, lay in a coffin, and seductively lurked about a mock cemetery. She also worked as a showgirl for the Earl Carroll Theatre and as a high-kicking chorus line dancer at the Florentine Gardens along with stripper Lili St. Cyr. In 1949, Man Ray brought a pair of "bat glasses" made by the artist Edward Melcarth for the art collector Peggy Guggenheim from Venice, Italy to Los Angeles for a photo shoot with Nurmi. By the 1950s, she had adopted the glasses as the signature accessory for character Vampira. Before landing her role as Vampira, she was working as a hat-check girl in a cloakroom on Hollywood's Sunset Strip. In the 1950s, she supported herself mainly by posing for pin-up photos in men's magazines such as Famous Models, Gala and Glamorous Models.

=== Origin of Vampira ===
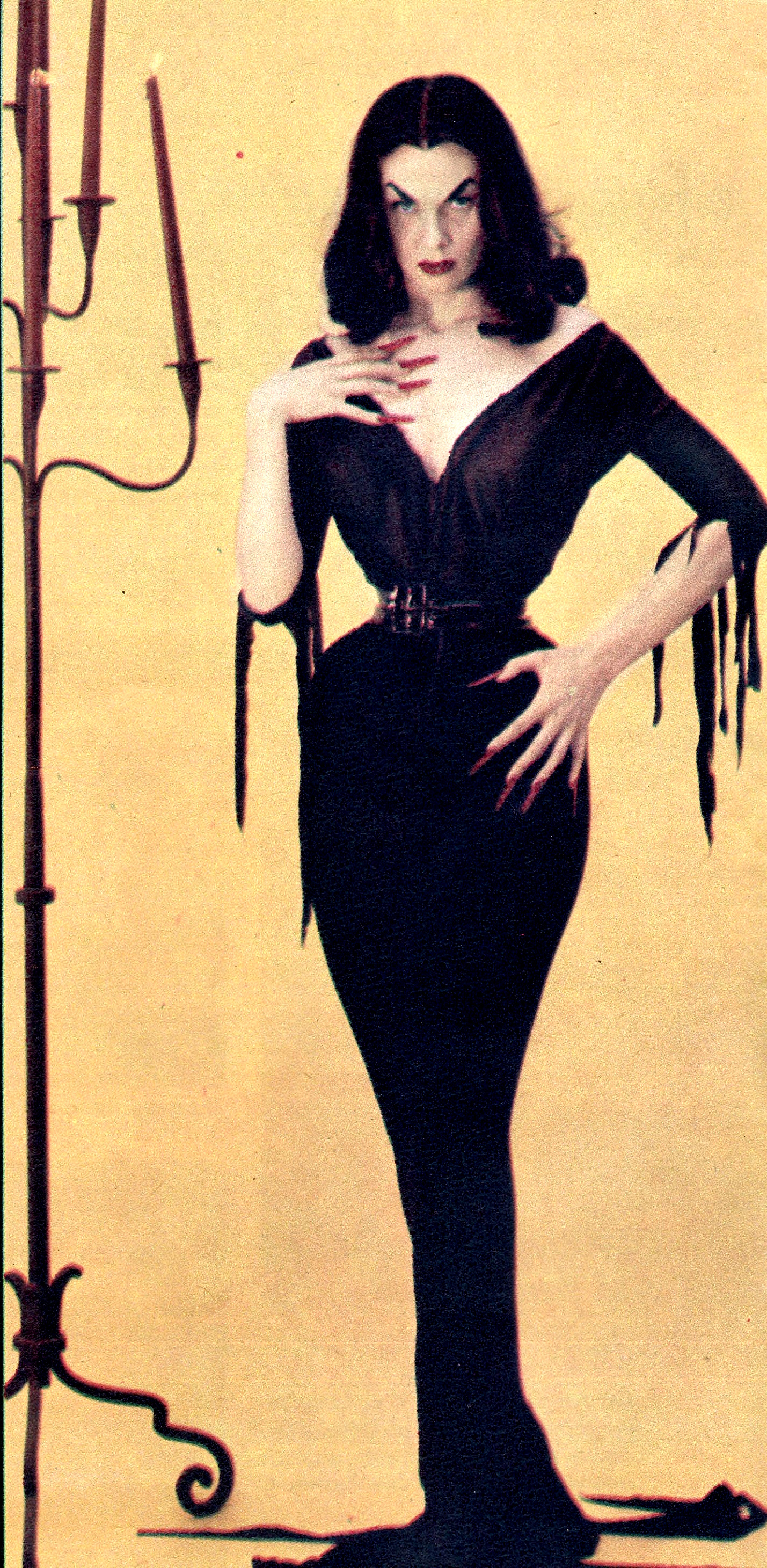
Nurmi in her Vampira costume

The idea for the Vampira character was born in 1953, when Nurmi attended choreographer Lester Horton's annual Bal Caribe Masquerade in a costume inspired by as-yet-unnamed Morticia Addams in The New Yorker cartoons of Charles Addams. Her appearance with pale white skin and tight black dress caught the attention of television producer Hunt Stromberg Jr., who wanted to hire her to host horror films on the Los Angeles television station KABC-TV, but Stromberg had no idea how to contact her. He finally got her phone number from Rudi Gernreich, later the designer of the topless swimsuit. The name Vampira was the invention of Nurmi's husband, Dean Riesner. Nurmi's characterization was influenced by the Dragon Lady from the comic strip Terry and the Pirates and the evil queen from Disney's Snow White and the Seven Dwarfs. Her measurements were advertised as 38-17-36.

On April 30, 1954, KABC-TV aired a preview, Dig Me Later, Vampira, at 11:00 p.m. The Vampira Show premiered the following night, May 1, 1954. For the first four weeks, it aired at midnight, then moved to 11:00 p.m. on May 29. Ten months later, it aired at 10:30 p.m., beginning March 5, 1955. Each show opened with Vampira gliding down a dark corridor flooded with dry-ice fog. At the end of her trance-like walk, the camera zoomed in on her face as she let out a piercing scream. She then introduced (and mocked) that evening's film while reclining barefoot on a skull-encrusted Victorian couch. Her horror-related comedy antics included ghoulish puns, such as encouraging viewers to write for epitaphs instead of autographs, and talking to her pet spider Rollo.

In one publicity stunt, she ran as a candidate for Night Mayor of Hollywood with a platform of "dead issues". In another, KABC had her cruise around Hollywood in the back of a chauffeur-driven 1932 Packard touring car with the top down, where she sat, as Vampira, holding a black parasol. The show was an immediate hit, and in June 1954 she appeared as Vampira in a horror-themed comedy skit on The Red Skelton Show along with Béla Lugosi and Lon Chaney Jr. That week, Life magazine ran an article on her, including a photo spread of her show-opening entrance and scream.

When her KABC series was cancelled in 1955, Nurmi retained rights to the Vampira character and took the show to a competing Los Angeles television station, KHJ-TV. Several episode scripts and a single promotional kinescope of Nurmi recreating some of her macabre comedy segments are held by private collectors. Several clips from the rare kinescope are included in the documentaries American Scary and Vampira: The Movie. The entire KABC kinescope, plus selections of the KABC pitchman who introduced the clips, is available in the 2012 documentary Vampira and Me.

Vampira and Me also features extensive clips from two previously unknown 16mm kinescopes of Nurmi as Vampira on national TV shows, including her starring guest spot on the April 2, 1955, episode of The George Gobel Show, a top 10 hit. The Vampira and Me restoration of the Gobel kinescope was documented in a 2013 short film entitled Restoring Vampira.

Examination of Nurmi's diaries in 2014 by filmmaker and journalist R. H. Greene verified longtime rumors that in 1956 she was the model for Maleficent, the evil witch in the Disney conception of the classic fairy tale "Sleeping Beauty." A Disney archivist subsequently confirmed these findings.

In 2007, the kinescope film of Nurmi in character was restored by Rerunmedia, whose restorations include The Ed Sullivan Show and Dark Shadows. The restoration utilized the groundbreaking LiveFeed Video Imaging process developed exclusively for the restoration of kinescopes. The restoration was funded by Spectropia Wunderhaus and Coffin Case.

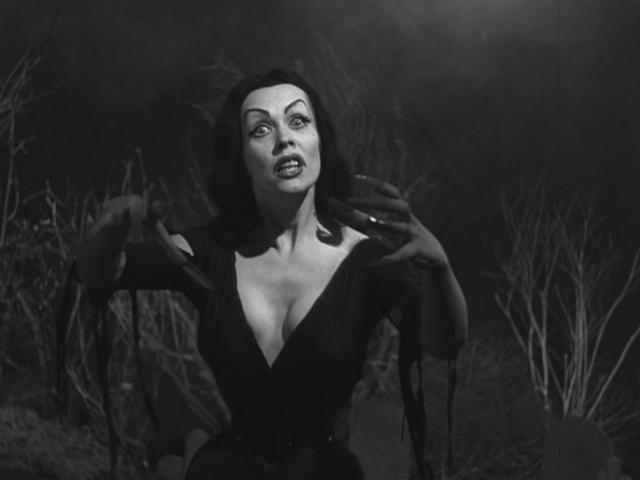
Nurmi in Plan 9 from Outer Space (1959)

Nurmi made television history as the first horror movie hostess. In 1957, Screen Gems released a syndicated package of 52 horror movies, mostly from Universal Pictures, under the program title Shock Theater. Independent stations in major cities all over the U.S. began showing these films, adding their own ghoulish host or hostess (including Vampira II and other lookalikes) to attract more viewers.

Nominated for a Los Angeles area Emmy Award for Most Outstanding Female Personality in 1954, she returned to films with Too Much, Too Soon in 1958, followed by The Big Operator and The Beat Generation. Her best known film appearance was in Ed Wood's camp classic, Plan 9 from Outer Space, as a Vampira-like zombie (filmed in 1956, but released in 1959). In 1960 she appeared in I Passed for White and Sex Kittens Go to College, followed by 1962's The Magic Sword, in which she played a hideous witch. The classic clip from Plan 9 from Outer Space featuring Vampira walking out of the woods with her hands pointing straight out was used to start the original opening sequence of WPIX Channel 11 New York's Chiller Theatre in the 1960s.

=== Later years ===
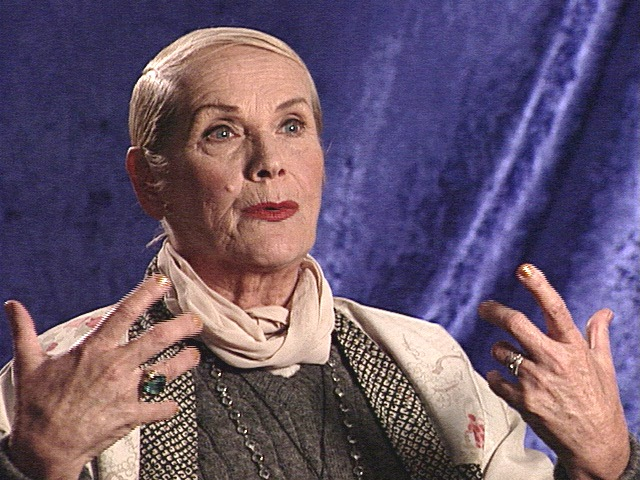
Maila Nurmi as she appeared in the 2001 documentary Schlock! The Secret History of American Movies

By 1962, Nurmi was making a living installing linoleum flooring. "And if things are slow in linoleum, I can also do carpentry, make drapes or refinish furniture", she told the Los Angeles Times.

In the early 1960s, she opened Vampira's Attic, an antiques boutique on Melrose Avenue. She also sold handmade jewelry and clothing. She made items for several celebrities, including Grace Slick of the music group Jefferson Airplane, and the Zappa family.

In 1981, Nurmi was asked by KHJ-TV to revive her Vampira character for television. She worked closely with the producers of the new show and was to get an executive producer credit, but eventually left the project over creative differences. According to Nurmi, it was because the station cast comic actress Cassandra Peterson in the part without consulting her. "They eventually called me in to sign a contract and she was there", Nurmi told Bizarre magazine in 2005. "They had hired her without asking me."

Unable to continue using the name Vampira, the show was abruptly renamed Elvira's Movie Macabre with Peterson playing the titular host. Nurmi soon filed a lawsuit against Peterson. The court eventually ruled in favor of Peterson, holding that "likeness means actual representation of another person's appearance, and not simply close resemblance." Peterson claimed that Elvira was nothing like Vampira aside from the basic design of the black dress and black hair. Nurmi claimed that the entire Elvira persona, which included comic dialogue and intentionally bad graveyard puns, infringed on her creation's "distinctive dark dress, horror movie props, and...special personality." Nurmi herself claimed that Vampira's image was in part based on the Charles Addams The New Yorker cartoon character Morticia Addams, though she told Boxoffice magazine in 1994 that she had intentionally deviated from Addams' mute and flat-chested creation, making her own TV character "campier and sexier" to avoid plagiarizing Addams' idea.

In 1986, she appeared alongside Tomata du Plenty of The Screamers in Rene Daalder's punk rock musical Population: 1, which was released on DVD in October 2008. According to a Daalder interview on the two-disc special edition of Population: 1, "There was a wild lady living out in back in a shed. Tomata befriended her and found out she had played Vampira".

In 1987, she recorded two seven-inch singles on Living Eye records with the band Satan's Cheerleaders. The singles, "I Am Damned" and "Genocide Utopia", were both released on colored vinyl, the second with a swastika on the label, and are extremely rare collector's items.

In 2001, Nurmi opened an official website and began selling autographed memorabilia and original art on eBay. Until her death, she lived in a small North Hollywood apartment.

Unlike Elvira, Nurmi authorized very few merchandising contracts for her Vampira character, though the name and likeness have been used unofficially by various companies since the 1950s. In 1994, she authorized a Vampira model kit for Artomic Creations, and a pre-painted figurine from Bowen Designs in 2001, both sculpted by Thomas Kuntz. In 2004, she authorized merchandising of the Vampira character by Coffin Case, for the limited purpose of selling skate boards and guitar cases.

== Personal life ==
Nurmi claimed she had a child with Orson Welles; since Welles was married to Rita Hayworth, the child was given up for adoption on the day he was born in March 1944.

On January 8, 1956, 23 year-old Ellis Barber (aka "The Vamp") forced his way into Nurmi's West 46th Street New York apartment and terrorized her for almost four hours. She escaped and called the police, with help from a local shop owner.

Nurmi first saw James Dean at the premiere for Sabrina on September 22, 1954. She was personally introduced to him the following day by fellow East of Eden actor Jonathan Haze. They spent time together at Googie's coffee shop on the corner of Crescent Heights and Sunset Boulevard in Hollywood. She explained their friendship by saying, "We have the same neuroses."

As Hedda Hopper related in a 1962 memoir that included a chapter on Dean: "We discussed the thin-cheeked actress who calls herself Vampira on television (and cashed in, after Jimmy died, on the publicity she got from knowing him and claimed she could talk to him 'through the veil'). He said: 'I had studied The Golden Bough and the Marquis de Sade, and I was interested in finding out if this girl was obsessed by a satanic force. She knew absolutely nothing. I found her void of any true interest except her Vampira make-up. She has no absolute.'"

The 2010 public radio documentary Vampira and Me by author/director R. H. Greene took issue with Hopper's depiction of the Nurmi/Dean relationship, pointing to an extant photo of Dean and Vampira sidekick Jack Simmons in full Boris Karloff Frankenstein make-up as evidence of Nurmi and Dean's friendship. The documentary also described a production memo in the Warner Bros. archive citing a set visit from "Vampira" while Dean was making Rebel Without a Cause.

The Warner Bros memo was first mentioned in the 2006 book Live Fast, Die Young: The Making of Rebel Without a Cause by Lawrence Frascella and Al Weisel, who were given access to the Rebel production files. An interview Frascella and Weisel conducted with actress Shelley Winters also uncovered an instance where Dean interrupted an argument with director Nicholas Ray and Winters so he could watch The Vampira Show on TV.

In Vampira and Me, Nurmi can be heard telling Greene that Jimmy Durante once appeared in a live bit on The Vampira Show where Vampira, dressed as a librarian, rapped his knuckles with a ruler because "he was a very naughty boy."

The English punk rock band the Damned wrote a song about Nurmi's relationship with Dean, called "Plan 9, Channel 7", which can be found on the 1979 album Machine Gun Etiquette. The lyrics state "She lays a wreath of lilies on his grave / And blames God for all the love he never gave / Not to be seduced by those red lips".

The American punk rock band the Misfits, wrote a song about Nurmi's Vampira character, called "Vampira", which can be found on the 1982 studio album Walk Among Us. The lyrics state "Two-inch nails/ A micro waist/ With a pale white, feline face/ Inclination eyebrows to there".

=== Marriages ===
In 1949, Nurmi married her first husband, Dean Riesner, a former child actor in silent films and later the screenwriter of Dirty Harry, Charley Varrick, Play Misty for Me, and numerous other movies and TV episodes.

She married her second husband, younger actor John Brinkley, on March 10, 1958.

She married actor Fabrizio Mioni on June 20, 1961, in Orange County, California.

== Death ==
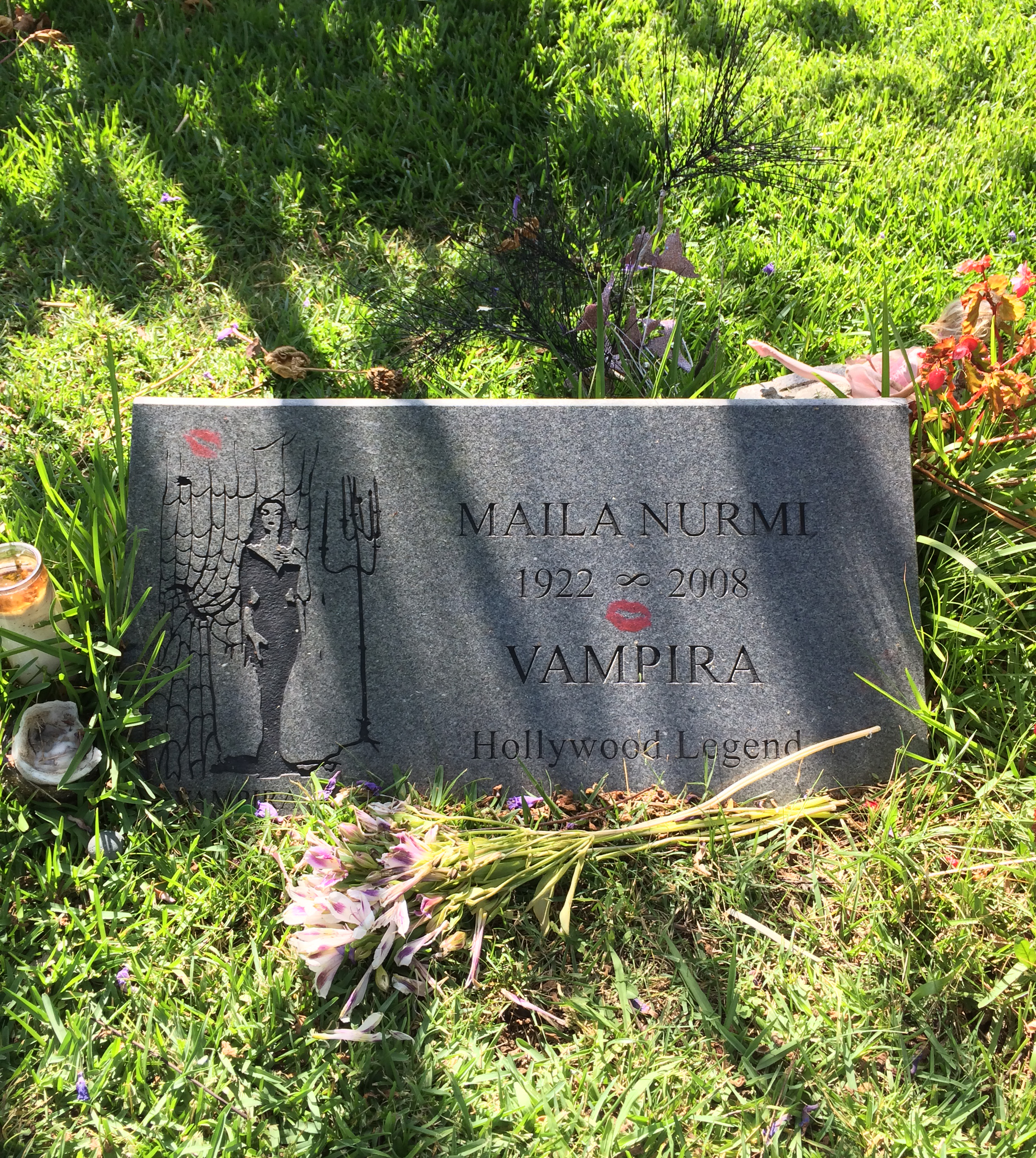
Grave of Vampira at Hollywood Forever

Nurmi died of natural causes on January 10, 2008, at her garage apartment in Hollywood, aged 85.

== Filmography ==
=== Television ===
| Year | Title | Role | Notes |
|---|---|---|---|
| 1952 | My Hero | Letitia | Episode: "Lady Mortician" |
| 1954 | The Red Skelton Hour | Vampira | Episode: "Dial 'B' for Brush" |
| 1954–1955 | The Vampira Show | Presenter (as Vampira) | |
| 1956–1957 | Vampira Returns | Presenter (as Vampira) | |
| 1957 | Playhouse 90 | Vampira | Episode: "The Jet Propelled Couch" |
| 1995 | Horror Kung-Fu Theatre | Vampira | Episode: "Honorary Cast Members of HKFT" |

=== Film ===
| Year | Title | Role | Notes |
|---|---|---|---|
| 1947 | If Winter Comes | Girl at bar | Uncredited |
| 1948 | Romance on the High Seas | Passenger | Uncredited |
| 1959 | Too Much, Too Soon | Vampira | As Vampira |
| 1959 | The Beat Generation | Beatnik girl | As Vampira |
| 1959 | Plan 9 from Outer Space | Vampira | As Vampira |
| 1959 | The Big Operator | Gina | As Vampira |
| 1960 | I Passed for White | Poet Gleen | As Vampira |
| 1960 | Sex Kittens Go to College | Edna Toodie | |
| 1962 | The Magic Sword | The Hag / Sorceress | |
| 1981 | Bungalow Invader | Vampira | Short film |
| 1986 | Population: 1 | Vampira | |
| 1992 | Flying Saucers Over Hollywood | Herself | Documentary |
| 1995 | Vampira | Herself | Documentary film |
| 1996 | Dry | Vanha Nainen | Short film |
| 1998 | I Woke Up Early the Day I Died | Woman in hotel lobby | |
| 2000 | No Way In | Woman at bar | Short film |

== Accolades ==
- Being the originator of the Television Horror Host subgenre of movie shows, Maila Nurmi and The Vampira Show received a special citation at a ceremony on the event of the 50th Anniversary of the television Emmy Awards.
- Nurmi was inducted posthumously into the Monster Kid Hall of Fame at the Rondo Hatton Classic Horror Awards. Vampira: The Movie won a Rondo for Best Independent Production as a tribute to Nurmi.

== Films and documentaries ==
- Ed Wood (1994), Tim Burton's biopic features actress-model Lisa Marie as Maila Nurmi. The film recreates parts of The Vampira Show.
- About Death, Sex and Taxes (1995), a Finnish documentary about Nurmi by Mika J. Ripatti.
- The Haunted World of Edward D. Wood, Jr. This 1995 Brett Thompson documentary about the life and films of Ed Wood also includes a recreation of The Vampira Show.
- Schlock! The Secret History of American Movies (2001), Ray Greene's documentary about the American exploitation and sexploitation films of the 1950s and 1960s features Nurmi alongside cult filmmakers Roger Corman, Doris Wishman, David F. Friedman, and others.
- Vampira: The Movie (2006), Kevin Sean Michaels' documentary about Nurmi, which won the 2007 Rondo Award for Best Independent Feature. Alpha Video distributed it on DVD in 2007.
- American Scary (2006) a documentary about local late-night horror movie hosts includes an interview with Nurmi.
- Pretty Bloody: The Women of Horror (2009), TV documentary on scream queens and other women in the horror industry.
- Vampira and Me (2010), radio documentary/podcast about Nurmi by her friend R. H. Greene. First broadcast by KPCC 89.3 FM, a Southern California NPR affiliate. In addition to previously unheard interview clips with Nurmi about her life and career, interviews with friends from Nurmi's declining years are also included. The program is available as a free download through the KPCC website.
- Vampira and Me (2012), feature documentary by R.H. Greene. Notable for uncovering and restoring two previously unknown kinescopes of Vampira appearing on network television in the 1950s, and for the inclusion of restored and previously unheard audio clips of Nurmi attempting to dictate her autobiography in 1966. Includes the first Vampira-related interviews ever conducted with Satan's Cheerleaders, the punk band Nurmi recorded with (as Vampira) in the mid-1980s and an extended interview with "Voluptua" (Nurmi's TV rival at KABC—TV) along with a vocal re-enactment of the Voluptua character by actress Gloria Pall.

== See also ==
- Elvira
- Lily Munster
- Morticia Addams

== Works cited ==
- Cotter, Robert (December 29, 2016). Vampira and Her Daughters: Women Horror Movie Hosts from the 1950s into the Internet Era. McFarland. ISBN 978-1476664347. OCLC 952390197.
- Frascella, Lawrence; Weisel, Al (September 20, 2005). Live Fast, Die Young: The Making of Rebel Without a Cause. Simon & Schuster. ISBN 978-0-743-26082-4. OCLC 60856229.
- Hopper, Hedda (1962). The Whole Truth and Nothing But. Doubleday.
- Keesey, Pam (1997). Vamps: An Illustrated History of the Femme Fatale. San Francisco: Cleis Press. ISBN 1-57344-026-4. OCLC 475044131.
- Maltin, Leonard (1997). Leonard Maltin's 1998 Movie and Video Guide. Signet Books. ISBN 0-451-19288-5. OCLC 940890187.
- Martinetti, Ronald (1995). The James Dean Story – A Myth-Shattering Biography of an Icon. Michael O'Mara Books. ISBN 978-1-559-72270-4. OCLC 476878785.
- Niemi, Sandra (2021). Glamour Ghoul: The Passions and Pain of the Real Vampira, Maila Nurmi. Feral House. ISBN 978-1627311007.
- Poole, W. Scott (2014). Vampira: Dark Goddess of Horror. Soft Skull Press. ISBN 978-1-593-76543-9. OCLC 896385109.
- Skal, David J. (1993). The Monster Show: A Cultural History of Horror. Penguin. OCLC 701106336.
