= Robert M. Lindner =

American author and psychologist

Robert M. Lindner (May 14, 1914 – February 27, 1956) was an American author and psychologist, best known as the author of the 1944 book Rebel Without A Cause: The Hypnoanalysis Of A Criminal Psychopath, from which the title of Nicholas Ray's 1955 film was adapted. His book described a psychopath as someone who is "incapable of exertions for the sake of others". Lindner's arguments on gambling psychology are well regarded and have been noted as "definitive statements" by the American Academy of Political and Social Science.

== Early life and education ==
Robert Mitchell Lindner was born in New York City on May 14, 1914, to Charles and Sadie (née Schwartz) Lindner. He was educated in the public schools of New York and earned a B.A. at Bucknell University. In 1937 he married Eleanor Johnson (1910–1996) while a graduate student at Cornell University, where he was awarded an M.A. in psychology in 1935 and a Ph.D. in psychology in 1938.

== Career ==
Lindner soon became head of the combined psychiatric-psychological services department of the federal penitentiary in Lewisburg, Pennsylvania. It was here that he compiled the case history later published as Rebel Without a Cause (1944). He also studied psychoanalysis while undergoing a training analysis with Theodor Reik, who had only recently fled from Nazi-controlled Austria. When the United States entered World War II, Lindner joined the United States Public Health Service Commissioned Corps at the rank of lieutenant junior grade. He left the service at war's end and settled in Baltimore, where for ten years he maintained a large private practice in psychoanalysis and served as chief consultant to the Maryland Department of Corrections. He also became a senior training analyst at Reik's new institute, the National Psychological Association for Psychoanalysis, which was one of the few organizations through which psychologists ( who were not medical doctors) could pursue psychoanalytic training.

Among the large number of patients he treated during this period, the best known to have been publicly identified was the author Philip Wylie, who settled in Baltimore in 1952 to undergo a full analysis with Lindner, whom he had been seeing intermittently since meeting him while serving as a Navy officer during World War II.

In 1947-1948 he served as the Maryland state chairman of the liberal Progressive Citizens of America, which became the state organization for Henry A. Wallace's quixotic 1948 third-party presidential campaign. In 1948 he was added to the national board of the PCA.

The movie adaptation of Rebel Without a Cause brought Lindner a measure of notoriety when it was released, although the story by Nicholas Ray bore no relation to the case history in Lindner's book. In 1954 the publication of "The Jet-Propelled Couch" as a two-part article in Harper's caused a small sensation with its tale of the delusional psychosis of a key government scientist, "Kirk Allen", who believed he was living a parallel life as overlord of a distant star system, and his treatment by Lindner. The true identity of "Kirk Allen" has been debated since, though it is likely that he was political scientist and intelligence operative Paul Linebarger, who became a well-known science fiction writer under the name Cordwainer Smith. It was collected in The Fifty-Minute Hour (1955), a collection of five case studies from his clinical practice. An ambitious attempt to adapt the story into a musical with songs by Stephen Sondheim came to nothing. In 1957 it was dramatized as an episode of TV's Playhouse 90 as "The Jet Propelled Couch" starring Donald O'Connor, Peter Lorre, David Wayne, Gale Gordon, and Vampira.

Lindner was active in a number of professional associations. He was a fellow of the American Psychological Association, a fellow of the American Association for the Advancement of Science, and an officer of the Medical Correctional Association. In 1953 he was elected an honorary fellow of the Fortean Society.

== Death ==
Robert Lindner died on February 27, 1956, at Johns Hopkins Hospital, where he had been a heart patient since January 14. At the time of his death he had started work on another book, The Wizard, which was to have been a study of a psychoanalyst. Shortly after Lindner's death plans were made for a memorial research foundation to be called the Robert Lindner Foundation. Norman Mailer, who had become friends with Lindner after reading Prescription for Rebellion, came to Lindner's funeral and became one of the sponsors and donors in setting up the foundation, along with Wylie, Max Lerner, Gerald W. Johnson, and Baltimore businessman Morton Abrahams. Theodore Reik was appointed to the foundation's professional committee, and delivered two lectures under the auspices of the foundation later that year.

== Works ==
- Lindner, Robert M. (1944). Rebel Without a Cause: The Hypnoanalysis of a Criminal Psychopath. ISBN 978-0-3941-7113-5
- — (1946). Stone Walls and Men. ISBN 978-5-8768-7198-5
- Lindner, Robert M.; Seliger, Robert V.; Lukas, Edwin J., eds. (1946). Contemporary Criminal Hygiene: a Source Book.
- — (1952). Prescription for Rebellion.
  - Above work republished posthumously under new title: Lindner, R. M. (1971). The Revolutionist’s Handbook (1st ed.). Zebra Books. Catalogue Number: Z-1092-T
- Lindner, Robert M., ed. (1953). Explorations in Psychoanalysis: Essays in Honor of Theodore Reik.
- — (1955). The Fifty-Minute Hour: a Collection of True Psychoanalytic Tales. ISBN 978-0-5532-0873-3
- — (1956). Must You Conform?.
