= Kirk Allen =

Pseudonymous patient (born c. 1918)

Kirk Allen (born c. 1918) was the alias given to an anonymized patient of psychoanalyst-author Robert M. Lindner in the last section of the latter's The Fifty-Minute Hour, entitled "The Jet-Propelled Couch". Following the publication of Brian Aldiss' Billion Year Spree, a history of science fiction, some speculation has ensued as to the true identity of "Allen". "Allen" had developed an elaborate worldbuilding project connected to a work by another, unnamed professional fiction writer.

== Lindner's account ==
Lindner and "Allen" met in Baltimore. The latter, born in Paris, had grown up in Hawaii. He enjoyed reading the Oz book series and had a sexual experience with his governess, "Miss Lillian" at age 11, when she began to seduce him, leading to a sexual relationship. He also difficulty reconciling himself, as an outsider, with both white culture and the Hawaiian culture. He retreated into a world of books.

In his teens, Allen found two separate works by different writers in which the a character had the same name as him. He then found "a long series of fantasies" by an American writer, the protagonist of which also had the name "Kirk Allen". This had occurred by age 14. At this or a later point, Allen began to think of them of the books as his own "biography". At 19, Allen attended university, and became a nuclear physicist working with the United States military on a classified research project during World War II, which helped to bring about the war's end.

Allen was thorough, and created full-color maps, sketches, a glossary of names and terms, socio-economic data, and more, all related to the "galactic system" (to use Lindner's term) in which Allen imagined his "real" self as living. In his words, as reported by Lindner:

My first effort, then, was to remember. I started by fixing in my mind, and later on paper in the forms of maps, genealogical tables, and so on, what the author of my biography had put down. When I had this mastered, by remembering I was able to correct his errors, fill in many details, and close gaps between one volume of the biography and the next.

He began to hallucinate being in the various settings of his stories, physically experiencing them. Soon, his employers became aware of his psychotic condition and demanded that he get psychiatric treatment. Reluctantly, he conceded. Lindner cured Allen by immersing himself in the fantasy world, but in the process became himself obsessed.

== Speculations regarding Lindner's account ==
=== The novel series ===
Some have theorized that the series mentioned was the series by Edgar Rice Burroughs, which featured the main character John Carter, who has many adventures on Mars, whose natives call "Barsoom". The first of the series appeared in book form in 1917. "Allen" would have had access to the first seven books of the series, which continued through the early 1940s. Lindner, in the account, describes his reluctant love of science fiction literature, which he regarded as a guilty pleasure. In this context, he mentions Burroughs in passing. He also mentioned Philip Wylie, himself a client of Lindner's, though Lindner does not mention the fact.

Brian Aldiss speculated that "Allen" had gotten inspiration from E. E. Smith's Lensmen series of space operas, which would contradict the account given in "The Jet-propelled Couch", as due to the dates of publication, "Allen" would not have had access to them as a young teenager. Alan C. Elms has suggested the adventures of Buck Rogers, usually known as his nickname "Buck" but having the actual first name Anthony. Elms pointed out that Linebarger had "Anthony" as one of his middle names.

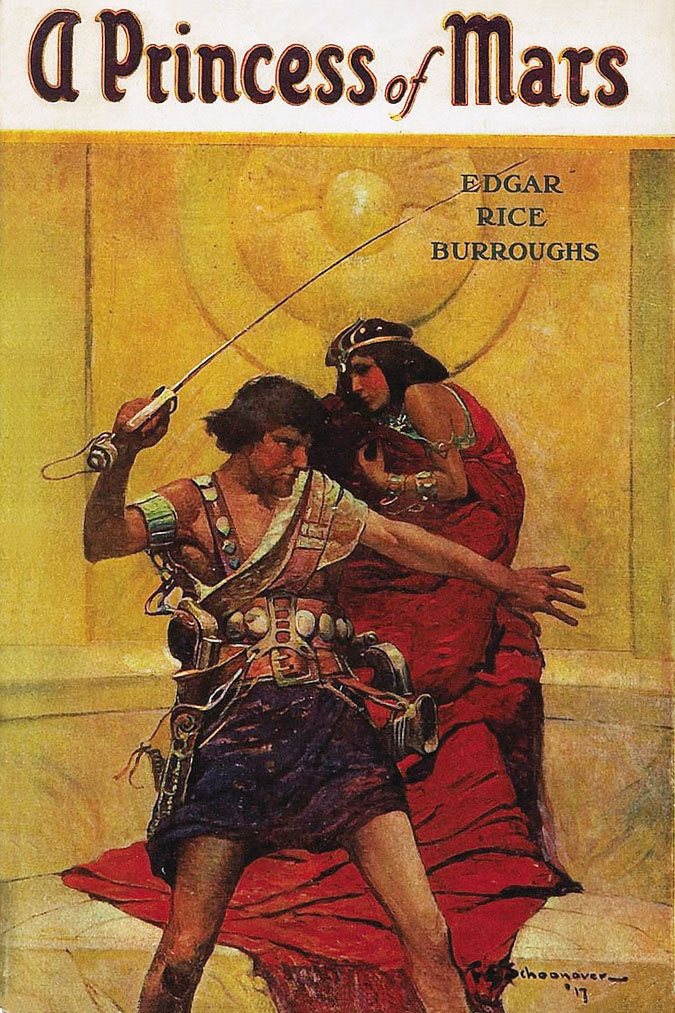
The first in the Barsoom series. John Carter is seen at left.

=== Candidates for the real "Allen" ===
Paul Linebarger (better known by his nom de plume, Cordwainer Smith) was long rumored to have been the original "Kirk Allen". According to Cordwainer Smith scholar Alan C. Elms, this speculation first reached print in Brian Aldiss's 1973 history of science fiction, Billion Year Spree; Aldiss, in turn, claimed to have received the information from Leon Stover. More recently, both Elms and librarian Lee Weinstein have gathered circumstantial evidence to support the case for Linebarger's being "Allen", but both concede there is no direct proof that Linebarger was ever a patient of Lindner's or that he suffered from a disorder similar to that of Kirk Allen. Although no direct link between Linebarger and Lindner has been proven, personalities in the science fiction world whom Lindner is known to have been personally acquainted with include Theodore Sturgeon, who was in psychoanalysis with an analyst recommended to him by Lindner.

Other investigators have proposed that Allen was someone other than Linebarger. Physicist Saul-Paul Sirag has theorized that Allen was the research physicist Francis Burton "Kiko" Harrison II, son of American politician and diplomat Francis Burton Harrison, citing areas of biographical similarity as well as a few possible instances of deliberate obfuscation.

== In popular culture ==
- The case formed the basis of "The Jet Propelled Couch", a television play broadcast in 1957 by the American television network CBS.
- In 2011, Stan Lee created the comic book series Starborn, based on Allen's story.
- Carl Sagan wrote about this case in Chapter 10 of his book The Demon-Haunted World: Science as a Candle in the Dark, Ballantine Books, March 1996.
- Ufologist Jacques Vallee wrote about the case in his book Revelations: Alien Contact and Human Deception, comparing it to the Ummo phenomenon.
- The case forms the basis of Thierry Smolderen and Alexandre Clérisse's graphic novel Souvenirs de l'empire de l'atome ("Memories of the Atomic Empire"), translated into English as Atomic Empire. Here, Paul, a research scientist, sees a Dr. Jensen.
