= The Beat Generation (film) =

1959 film by Charles F. Haas

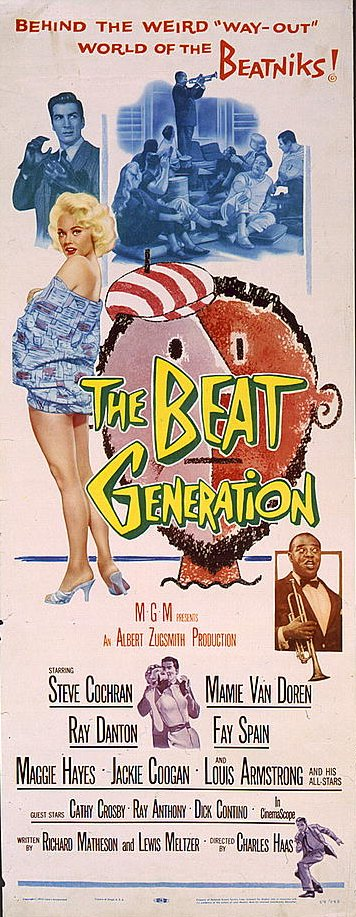
- Theatrical release poster by Reynold Brown
- Directed by: Charles F. Haas
- Written by: Richard Matheson; Lewis Meltzer
- Produced by: Albert Zugsmith
- Starring: Steve Cochran; Mamie Van Doren
- Cinematography: Walter Castle
- Edited by: Ben Lewis
- Music by: Albert Glasser
- Production company: Albert Zugsmith Productions
- Distributed by: Metro-Goldwyn-Mayer
- Release date: July 3, 1959
- Running time: 96 minutes
- Country: United States
- Language: English
- Budget: $439,000
- Box office: $750,000

The Beat Generation is a 1959 American crime film from Metro-Goldwyn-Mayer starring Steve Cochran and Mamie Van Doren, with Ray Danton, Fay Spain, Maggie Hayes, Jackie Coogan, Louis Armstrong, James Mitchum, Vampira, and Ray Anthony. It is a sensationalistic interpretation of the beatnik counterculture of the "Beat Generation" (and is sometimes considered one of the last films noir to be produced.) The movie was also shown under the title This Rebel Age. The movie is about a "beatnik" who is a serial rapist, who is pursued by a police detective. The director was Charles F. Haas. Richard Matheson and Lewis Meltzer are credited with the screenplay.

== Plot ==
In the opening scene, a "beatnik" named Stan Hess sits at a table in a coffee house with a woman who begs him for his affection. He scorns her, then encounters his father at another table, who announces his engagement to a younger woman who had also pursued Stan. He insults his stepmother-to-be and departs. Hess is established as a woman-hating habitué of a stereotyped and sensationalized beatnik scene.

Soon after, we learn that Hess is a serial rapist at large in Los Angeles. His modus operandi is to gain entry to the home of a married woman whose husband is away by pretending to be there to repay money loaned by the husband. Once inside, he feigns a headache, pulls out a tin of aspirin, and asks the woman for water. While she is distracted by this errand, he sneaks up behind her, and then assaults and rapes her. He leaves the tin of aspirin behind as his calling card, leading the police to call him "The Aspirin Kid." Leaving the scene of the first assault portrayed in the film, he is nearly hit by a car. The driver, who is a police detective named Culloran, gives him a lift, and the two engage in conversation. The rapist calls himself Arthur Garret, and as the two talk, he learns that Culloran is married, and sees his address on an envelope on the car seat. After getting out of Culloran's car, he writes down the name and address, and the word "married", foreshadowing his later rape of Culloran's wife.

Coincidentally, the case of 'The Aspirin Kid' is assigned to Culloran and his partner, Baron. Culloran is a twice married man whose first marriage has made him suspicious of women. They have a suspect, a beatnik called Art Jester who fits a description of 'The Aspirin Kid' but his alibi checks out.

Hess/Garrett calls Culloran at the police station, and lures him to a rendezvous at a night club by promising to turn himself in. Instead of coming to the club, though, he goes to Culloran's home and attacks his wife, Francee, also telling her his name is Arthur Garret. Culloran becomes obsessed with catching the rapist on his own without telling his colleagues that his wife has been raped. Francee later finds out she is pregnant. The possibility that the child may have been fathered by the rapist sows discord between the Cullorans, and stokes Detective Culloran's obsession with avenging the rape. The couple argue over their ambivalence about the child and Francee's desire to have an abortion, leading Francee to turn to Baron's wife first, and then Baron for advice.

Garrett persuades Jester to try to throw Culloran off the track by committing a similar attack on a woman named Georgia Altera at a time when Garrett couldn't possibly be involved. But the cops know that Garrett is their man. Jester and Altera fall for each other.

At a party near the beach, the deranged Culloran attempts to capture Garrett. After an elaborate scuba-diving chase sequences, Culloran captures and beats up Garrett coming close to killing him before Baron intervenes. Culloran comes to his senses and returns to Francee, who gives birth.

== Cast ==
- Steve Cochran – Dave Culloran
- Mamie Van Doren – Georgia Altera
- Ray Danton – Stan Hess
- Fay Spain – Francee Culloran
- Maggie Hayes – Joyce Greenfield
- Jackie Coogan – Jake Baron
- Louis Armstrong – Himself
- Cathy Crosby – The Singer
- Ray Anthony – Harry Altera
- Dick Contino – The Singing Beatnik
- James Mitchum – Art Jester
- Irish McCalla – Marie Baron
- Vampira – The Poetess
- Billy Daniels – Dr. Elcott
- Maxie Rosenbloom – The Wrestling Beatnik
- Charles Chaplin Jr. – Lover Boy
- Norm Grabowski – The Beat Beatnik

== Production ==
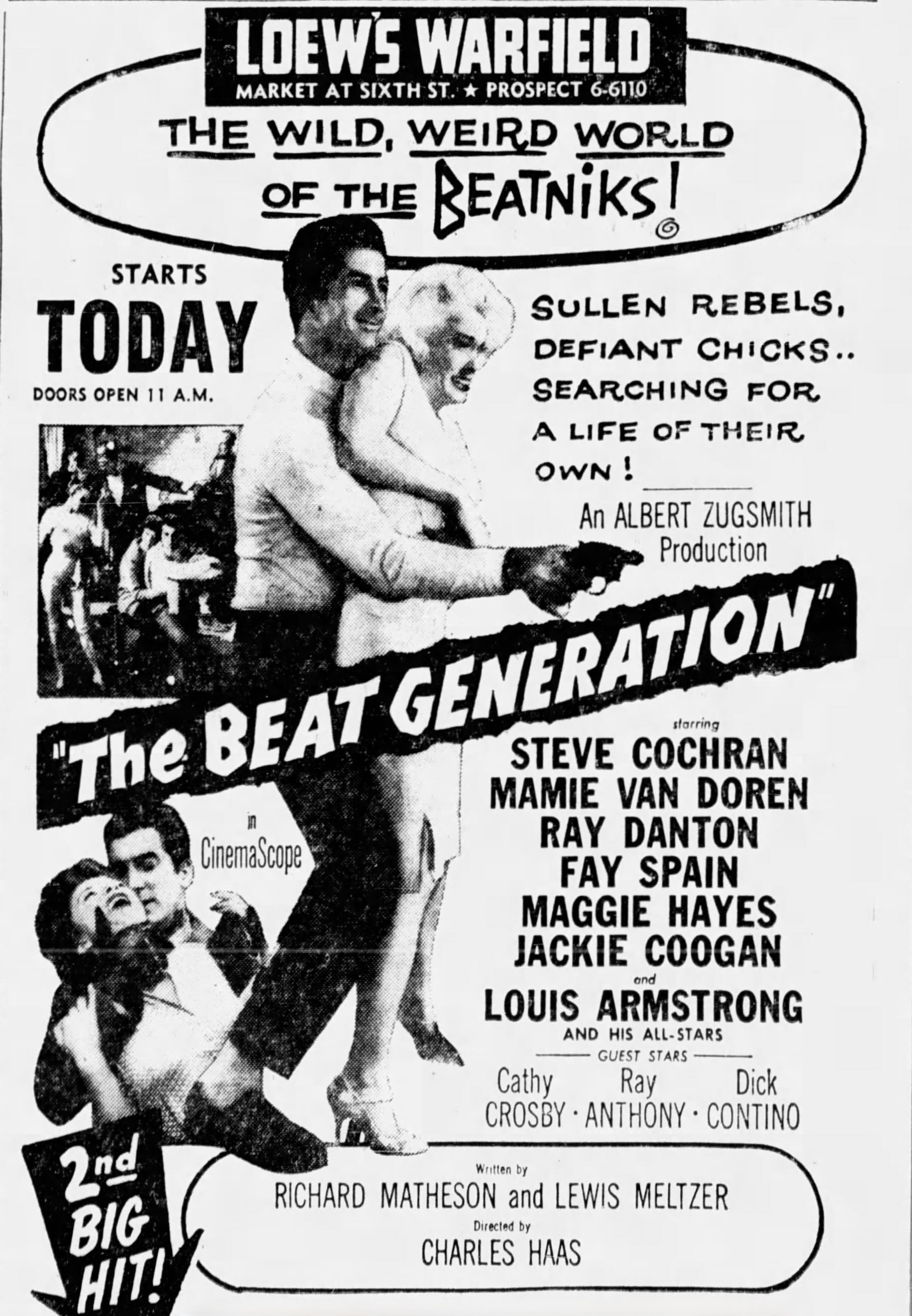
Theatrical advertisement from 1959

It was known during production as The Beat and the Naked Generation.

Richard Matheson, who had written The Incredible Shrinking Man for Zugsmith, said The Beat Generation was based on a true story "about a guy who would meet salesmen and talk to them on the road, learn all about their houses, where they were during the day, what they did; then he would go and attack the wives while the salesmen were still on the road. I wrote it as a police procedure film. It ended up . . . well, you know how. I remember a copy of the script, many drafts in, where Zugsmith had meticulously crossed off police everywhere and had written in fuzz. It turned into absolute nonsense."

== Box office ==
According to MGM records the film earned $400,000 in the US and Canada and $350,000 elsewhere resulting in a loss of $113,000.

== See also ==
- A Bucket of Blood, a 1959 American comedy horror film
- List of American films of 1959
