= The Jet Propelled Couch =

- Playhouse 90 episodes
- Cast of "The Jet Propelled Couch"
- Episode nos.: Season 2 Episodes 10
- Directed by: Burgess Meredith and James Clark
- Written by: Stanley Roberts (adaptation), Robert M. Lindner (story)
- Original air date: November 14, 1957

Guest appearances
- Donald O'Connor as Dr. Robert Harrison; David Wayne as Dr. Kirk Allen; Peter Lorre as Dr. Ostrow

Episode chronology
← Previous "The Clouded Image"	Next → "The Troublemakers"

"The Jet Propelled Couch" is an American television play broadcast on November 14, 1957, as part of the second season of the CBS television series Playhouse 90. Burgess Meredith and James Clark directed. Donald O'Connor, David Wayne, and Peter Lorre starred.

== Plot ==
A psychoanalyst, Dr. Robert Harrison, is called on by the government to treat a noted atomic physicist Dr. Kirk Allen, who believes that he lives both on Earth as a scientist in a government research laboratory, and on another planet where he is the dominant authority and has powers of telepathy and teleportation. The story concerns Dr. Harrison's "adventure into outer space" as he "becomes too involved in the other world of his patient." The two of them end up "visiting a celestial asteroid". In the other world, there are two or more girls for every man, wishes are undisputed, and everyday troubles are eliminated.

== Cast ==
The following cast received screen credit for their performances.

- Donald O'Connor as Dr. Robert Harrison
- David Wayne as Dr. Kirk Allen
- Peter Lorre as Dr. Ostrow
- Gale Gordon as Gen. Milton Dagby
- Phyllis Avery as Eleanor Harrison

== Production ==
Burgess Meredith and James Clark directed the production, and Martin Manulis was the producer. Stanley Roberts wrote the teleplay based on a nonfiction account by Robert M. Lindner, best known as the author of Rebel Without a Cause. Lindner's original account was first published by Harper's Magazine in its December 1954 issue. An extended version of the story was published in 1955 as part of Lindner's book, The Fifty-Minute Hour.

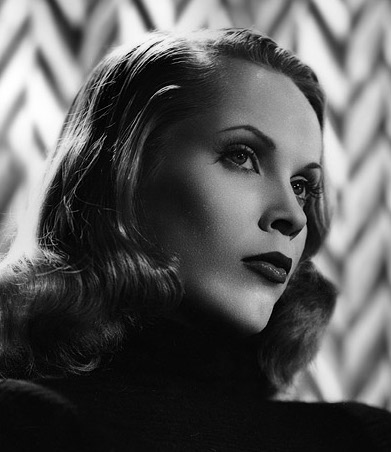
Maila Nurmi ("Vampira") in 1947

The teleplay was broadcast on November 14, 1957, as part of the second season of the anthology television series, Playhouse 90. It was broadcast shortly after the launch of Sputnik and as Sputnik 2 orbited the Earth. Director Burgess Meredith noted, "Publicity-wise the Russians have really come to our aid."

Burgess Meredith made his television directorial debut on the production. One of the challenges facing the producers was in the depiction of the alien creatures on the other planet. Meredith noted at the time that they wanted the women to be "different, but not too different." They hired "Miss Color TV", Maila Nurmi (a.k.a. Vampira), and a number of Miss Americas to play the roles of the alien women.

Donald O'Connor played the role of the psychiatrist. The role was a departure from his usual song-and-dance roles. O'Connor noted: "Naturally, I'm very nervous about this dramatic role. It's not heavy drama, though, and I'm very glad that Burgess Meredith is directing it."

Phyllis Avery, known for her role as Ray Milland's wife in the sitcom Meet Mr. McNutley, was cast as Dr. Harrison's wife. She said of the role, "It's nice to be a nice girl again[...]. I guess I like being a wife best of all."

== Reception ==
In The New York Times, critic Jack Gould found the production to be in "rather questionable taste" as it shifted moods from playful satiric humor to serious issues of psychiatry and the depiction of the scientist as a troubled human being. Gould concluded: "Mixing psychiatry and comedy calls for a surer and subtler touch than was evidenced last night."
