= Thomas Kuntz =

American artist

Thomas James Kuntz
- Born: January 13, 1965 (age 61); Phoenix, Arizona
- Known for: Automata / Sculpture / Mixed Media

Thomas Kuntz (born January 13, 1965) is an American multi-media artist notable for his contemporary automata. He has devoted a lifetime to acquiring the skills of a designer, sculptor, mechanic, automatist, animator, model-maker, painter and conceptualist.

== Early life ==
Kuntz was born in Phoenix, Arizona January 13, 1965. The youngest of four, his father was a surgeon, and his mother a folk artist/doll maker. They both provided the necessary gene pool and a stimulating environment for him to grow. As a child he pored over anatomy books, spent much time with sketchpads, and built his first scale model at age six. As a model maker, he was competing in the masters class (professional) by age 16. Kuntz spent the balance of his youth playing soccer, ending in a brief stint with the Western Soccer League.

== Early works ==
In 1986, Kuntz began a professional sculpting career with his own experimental entity called Artomic Creations. While contemporaries focused on popular characters, Kuntz became one of the pioneers of the garage kit industry by creating several figure models based on obscure characters from silent movies and occult lore. Gaining notoriety upon these works, he was courted by commercial model and toy companies such as Screamin‘ Products Bowen Designs, Mattel, Ertl Company and Jakks Pacific. Subsequent inspiration came from the legendary Maila Nurmi (Vampira). They met in 1990 when Kuntz was granted permission to model a Vampira figure, and they remained confidants for 18 years until the day when he was a pallbearer at her funeral. To quote Kuntz in an article he wrote shortly after her death, "She was a mentor, a muse, and a huge inspiration to me."

== Current works ==
Kuntz now works full-time as a multi-media artist, focusing on automatons, moving sculptures and machines. The British illusionist, Simon Drake noted "Thomas's projects tend to feature the mysterious, uncanny, sometimes darkly horrific and bittersweet sad aspects of human nature. It is not uncommon to see his projects packaged with a strong dose of 'gallows humor', theatrics and magic." Kuntz uses uncanny valley, the theory holds that when robots and other facsimiles of humans look and act almost like actual humans, it causes a response of revulsion among human observers. The "valley" in question is a dip in a proposed graph of the positivity of human reaction as a function of a robot's human likeness. In robotics this is seen as a problem. Kuntz uses this as an area of exploration.

On his most complex piece to date, the "Alchemyst's Clock Tower" uses theme park technology and 18th century automaton techniques applied to fine art. The clock tower is a 9 ft tall miniature theater with a 12" tall magician that conjures fire demons, turns pillars into water, produces optical illusions, and interacts with the audience. “L’Oracle“, his fortune telling automaton appeared on a Halloween special of the Martha Stewart television show as part of Richard Garriott’s collection.

Other notable works include animatronics and stage design for the industrial band Skinny Puppy's Doomsday: Back and Forth Series 5: Live in Dresden, and various live shows for Ohgr. Kuntz was also the animator, art director and stop-motion puppet builder for Ohgr's music video Majik, directed by William Morrison. A small collection of his works were borrowed by director William Malone for the film Parasomnia.

== Influences ==
Kuntz takes an alchemical approach to his art, conjoining seemingly opposing ideas and techniques. Kuntz’s works are influenced equally by low-brow and high-brow sensibilities, ranging from Expressionism, Dada /Surrealism, to the old masters Albrecht Dürer, Hieronymus Bosch, Bruegel, Da Vinci, and Archimboldo. Mechanical influences include 18th and 19th century android makers, particularly Jacques de Vaucanson, Pierre Jaquet-Droz, Jean-Frédéric Leschot, and the great Parisian makers of the golden age. Other magical influences include Wolfgang von Kempelen, the French mechanic/magician Robert Houdin, as well as Walt Disney and the early Imagineers; especially Rolly Crump.
