= Around the World in 90 Minutes =

- Playhouse 90 episodes
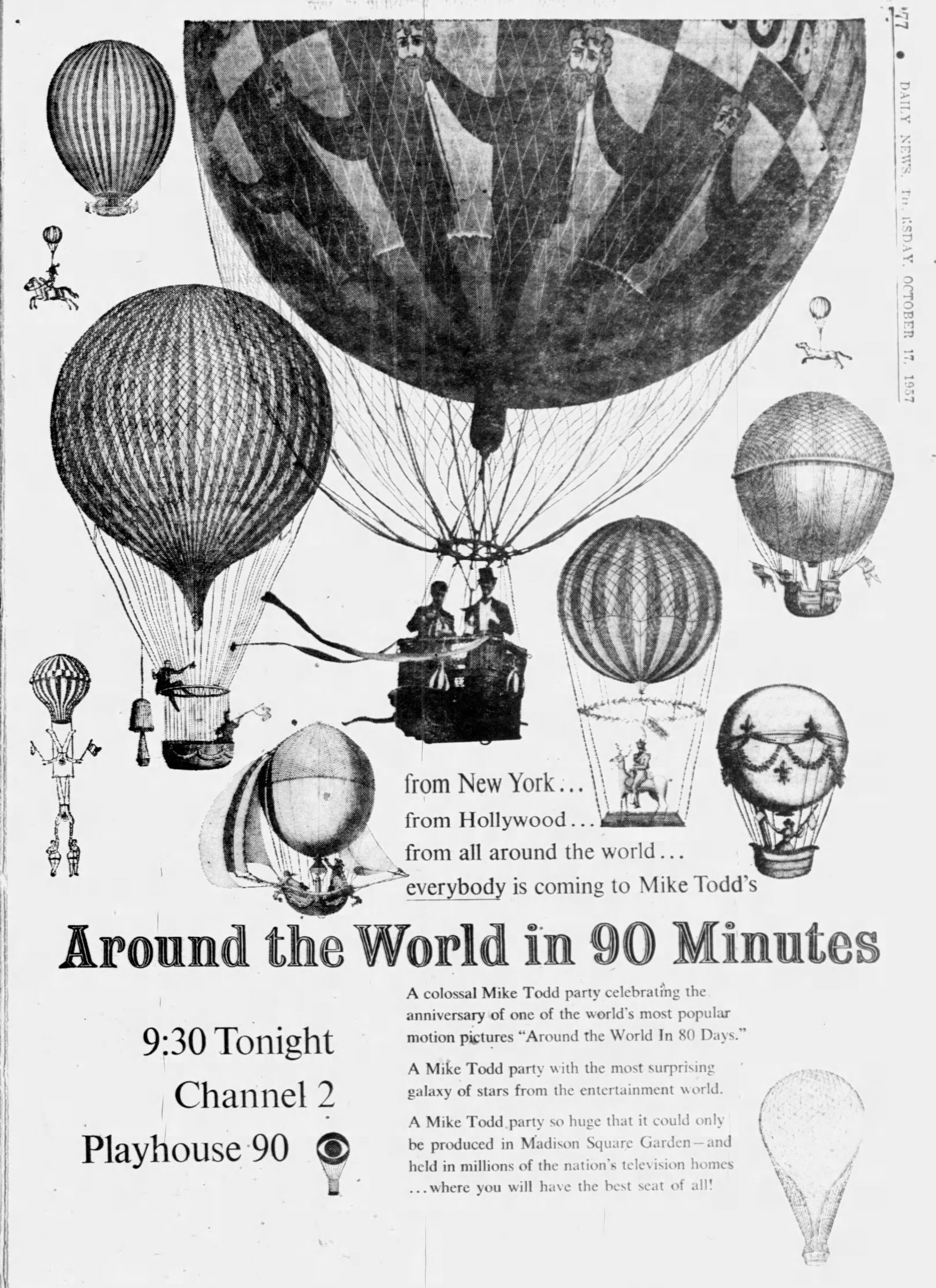
- Newspaper ad for the production
- Episode nos.: Season 2 Episodes 6
- Directed by: Byron Paul
- Original air date: October 17, 1957

Guest appearances
- Elizabeth Taylor; Frank Sinatra

Episode chronology
← Previous "The Playroom"	Next → "The Mystery of Thirteen"

"Around the World in 90 Minutes" was an American television special that was broadcast on October 17, 1957, as part of the second season of the CBS television series Playhouse 90.

== Production ==
The event was held at Madison Square Garden and hosted by Elizabeth Taylor, Mike Todd, and Garry Moore. Art Cohn was the producer and Byron Paul the director. Arthur Fiedler conducted the Symphony of the Air. Walter Cronkite, Jim McKay, and Bill Leonard served as reporters during the event.

The event was attended by 18,000 persons and shared live with a national television audience. The event was a celebration of the first anniversary of Mike Todd's film, Around the World in 80 Days. Todd reportedly paid nothing for the party, as CBS provided a production budget of $125,000, and numerous sponsors provided gifts and displays. When asked how much CBS had given him for the party, Todd said: "I wouldn't know. I'm an artist — I don't think in terms of money."

During the broadcast, Mike Todd's wife Elizabeth Taylor was given the responsibility to cut the first piece from a 30 by 14 foot birthday cake.

Guests appearing at the special included Frank Sinatra, Maurice Chevalier, Charles Boyer, Hubert Humphrey, Elsa Maxwell, Ginger Rogers, George Jessel, Hedda Hopper, Tony Curtis, Cedric Hardwicke, James Mason, Joe E. Lewis, Fernandel, and Janet Leigh.

== Reception ==
The program was aired at the same time as Hallmark Hall of Fame's acclaimed presentation of The Green Pastures on the NBC network. Around the World in Ninety Minutes received a Trendex rating of 34.5, trouncing The Green Pastures which received a rating of 12.5.

Variety wrote that the event was filled with contagious disorganization, though the mishaps provided "a welcome relief from the myriad of dancers, parading extras, bagpipers, horses, elephants, horses, dancers and horses." Time magazine called it "mass gaucherie".
