= The Mystery of Thirteen =

- Playhouse 90 episode
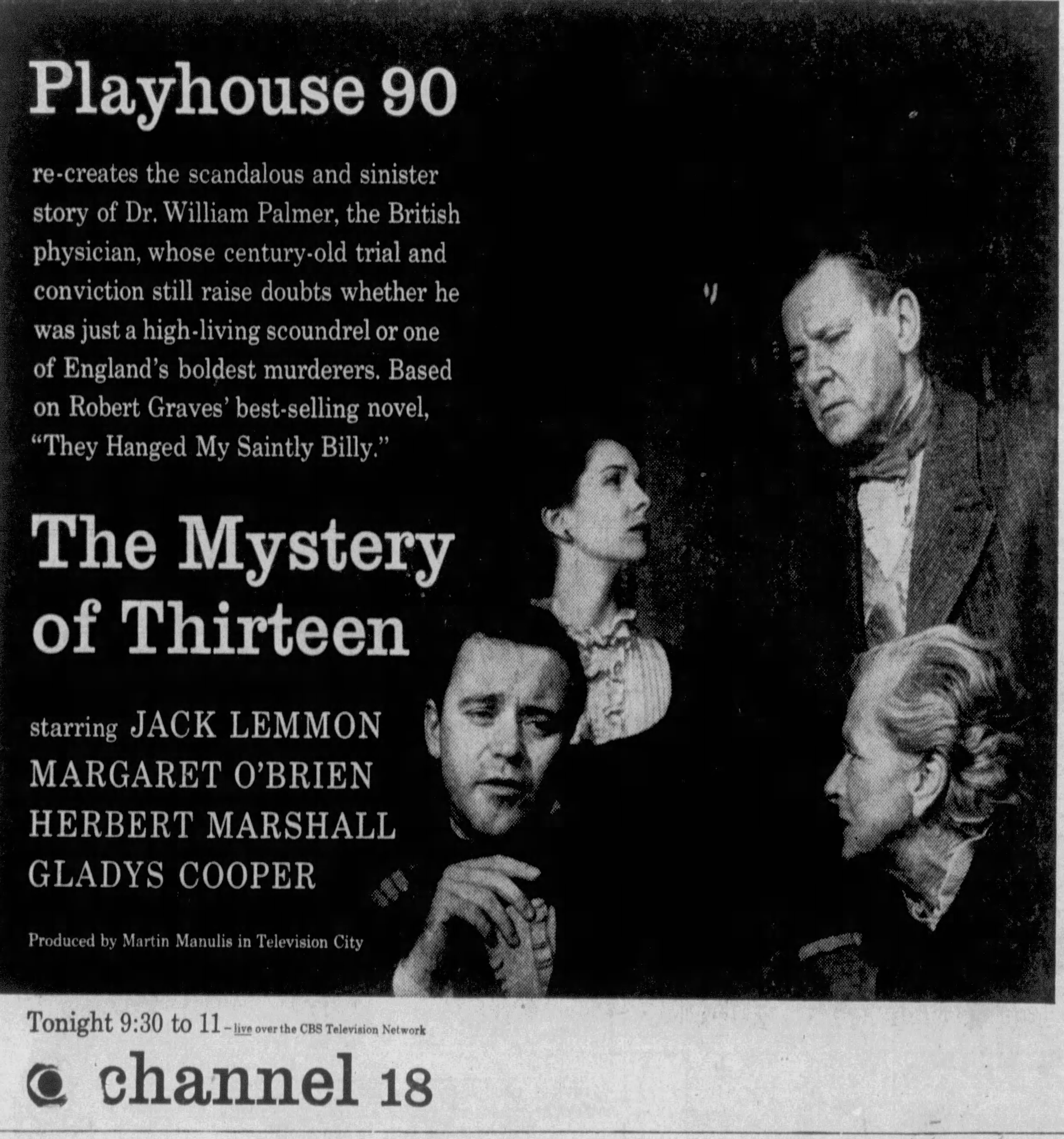
- Newspaper ad for "The Mystery of Thirteen"
- Episode no.: Season 2 Episode 7
- Directed by: Robert Mulligan
- Written by: David Shaw (adaptation), Robert Graves (story)
- Original air date: October 24, 1957

Guest appearances
- Jack Lemmon as Dr. Billy Palmer; Margaret O'Brien as Annie Brookes; Herbert Marshall as Dr. Knight

Episode chronology
← Previous "Around the World in 90 Minutes"	Next → "The Edge of Innocence"

"The Mystery of Thirteen" was an American television play broadcast in 1957 as part of the CBS television series Playhouse 90. Jack Lemmon starred as the notorious English physician, William Palmer, who was suspected of 13 murders and was hanged in 1856 for poisoning a close friend. Margaret O'Brien co-starred, David Shaw wrote the teleplay, and Robert Mulligan directed.

== Plot ==
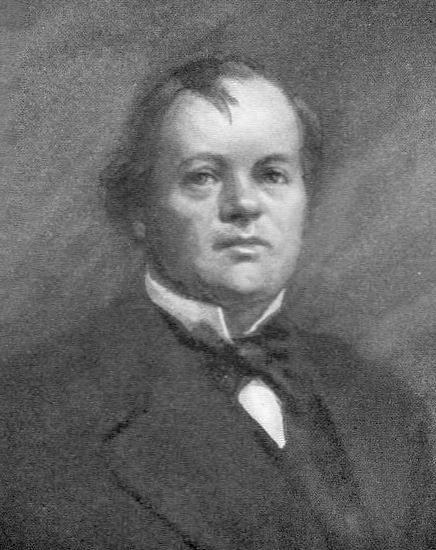
W. Palmer

The play is based on the real-life story of an English physician, William Palmer, also known as the "Prince of Poisoners". Palmer was accused of murdering numerous persons, including his own brother and children, and was ultimately hanged for poisoning a close friend. Charles Dickens called Palmer "the greatest villain that ever stood in the Old Bailey".

== Cast ==
- Jack Lemmon as Dr. Billy Palmer
- Margaret O'Brien as Annie Brookes
- Herbert Marshall as Dr. Knight
- Gladys Cooper as Mrs. Palmer
- Henry Jones as Walter Palmer
- John Baragrey as John Parsons Cook
- Romney Brent

== Production ==
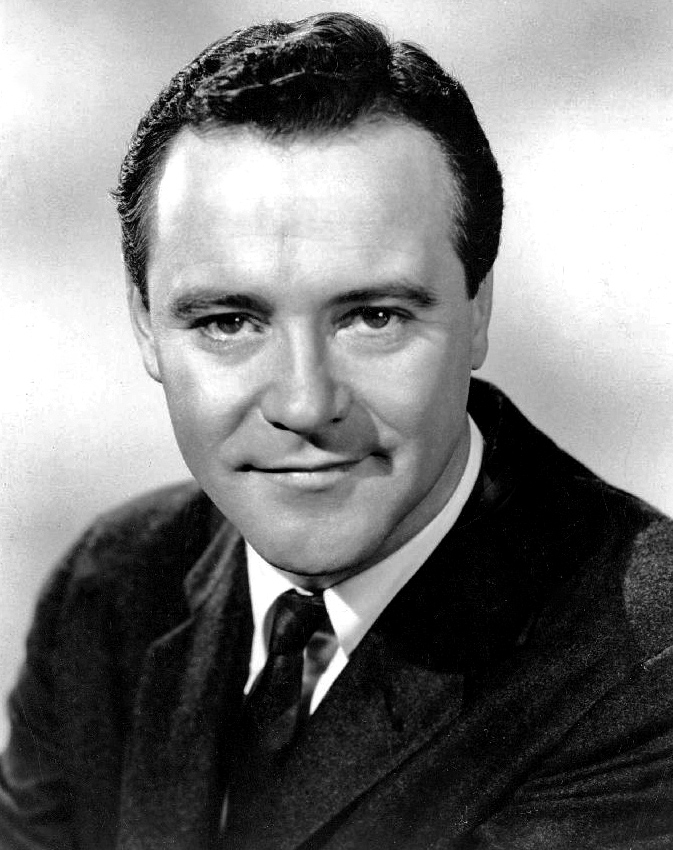
Jack Lemmon

The production was broadcast live from CBS Television City in Hollywood on October 24, 1957, as part of the second season of the CBS television series Playhouse 90. David Shaw wrote the teleplay, as an adaptation of Robert Graves' best-selling novel, They Hanged My Saintly Billy. Robert Mulligan directed, and Martin Manulis was the producer. Jack Lemmon, Margaret O'Brien, and Herbert Marshall starred.

== Reception ==
Time magazine opined that the sympathetic portrayal of a criminal broke new ground on TV, but proved to be "cold, cold ground." The reviewer concluded that Lemmon's charm and skill could not make the protagonist palatable. Lacking either satire or intrigue, Time found that it "amounted to a catalogue of crime with little more dramatic point or development than the police blotter."
