= The Clouded Image =

- Playhouse 90 episode
- Episode no.: Season 2 Episode 9
- Directed by: Franklin J. Schaffner
- Written by: James P. Cavanaugh (adaptation), Josephine Tey (story)
- Original air date: November 7, 1957

Guest appearances
- Farley Granger as Peter Ashby/Brat Farrar; Judith Anderson as Aunt Bee; Vincent Price as Alex

Episode chronology
← Previous "The Edge of Innocence"	Next → "The Jet Propelled Couch"

"The Clouded Image" was an American television play broadcast on November 7, 1957, as part of the second season of the CBS television series Playhouse 90. James P. Cavanaugh wrote the teleplay, as an adaptation of Josephine Tey's novel Brat Farrar. Franklin J. Schaffner directed, and Martin Manulis was the producer. Farley Granger, Judith Anderson, and Vincent Price starred.

== Plot ==
A young stranger, Brat Farrar, shows up claiming to be the twin brother of a young Englishman, Peter Ashby, who is set to inherit a huge fortune. Farrar claim to have a right to half of the estate. Farley Granger plays the roles of both Peter Ashby and Brat Farrar.

== Cast ==
- Farley Granger as Peter Ashby / Brat Farrar
- Judith Anderson as Aunt Bee
- Terry Moore as Eleanor
- Vincent Price as Alex
- Patty McCormack as Jane
- John Williams as Sandal
