= The Edge of Innocence =

- Playhouse 90 episode
- Teresa Wright and Joseph Cotten from "The Age of Innocence"
- Episode no.: Season 2 Episode 8
- Directed by: Arthur Hiller
- Written by: Berne Giler
- Original air date: October 31, 1957

Guest appearances
- Joseph Cotten as Robert Rainey; Teresa Wright as Carol Morton; Maureen O'Sullivan as Julia Williams

Episode chronology
← Previous "The Mystery of Thirteen"	Next → "The Clouded Image"

"The Edge of Innocence" was an American television film broadcast on November 7, 1957, as part of the CBS television series, Playhouse 90. It aired as the eighth episode of the second season.

== Plot ==
A lawyer, Robert Rainey, defends a friend, Lowell Williams, who is charged with murder.

== Cast ==
- Joseph Cotten as Robert Rainey
- Teresa Wright as Carol Morton
- Maureen O'Sullivan as Julia Williams
- Beverly Garland as Gay Sherman
- Lorne Greene as Lowell Williams
- Dan Barton as Jay Pauling
- DeForest Kelley as Lambert

== Production ==
Arthur Hiller was the director and Eva Wolas the producer. Berne Giler wrote the script. The film was produced by Screen Gems for Playhouse 90.

== Reception ==
In The New York Times, Jack Gould wrote that "absurdities were plentiful" and Berne Giler's familiarity with legal procedure was "remote" and his knowledge of play-writing "even more distant." He did credit Cotten with "a competent portrayal as a defense attorney."
