= Hunt Stromberg Jr. =

American producer (1923–1986)

- Born: May 16, 1923; Los Angeles, California, United States
- Died: November 24, 1986 (aged 63); Los Angeles, California, United States
- Occupation(s): Theatre producer, television producer, radio producer
- Parent: Hunt Stromberg

Hunt Stromberg Jr. (May 16, 1923 – November 24, 1986) was a Broadway, radio and television producer best remembered for the discovery and casting of Maila Nurmi as Vampira, and for producing the 1973 film Frankenstein: The True Story.

== Life and career ==
Stromberg was born in Los Angeles, California, on May 16, 1923, the son of legendary Metro-Goldwyn-Mayer and independent producer Hunt Stromberg. He began his career as a producer with the successful revival of Victor Herbert's The Red Mill in 1945 - which, at age 23, made him the youngest producer on Broadway. He followed up with revivals of The Front Page in 1946 and Sally in 1948.

In the early 1950s Stromberg was program director for KABC-TV, a Los Angeles ABC-TV affiliate, and was looking for a host for a late-night horror movie program. He remembered seeing a beautiful, wasp-waisted woman win first prize at a masquerade ball dressed as a ghoul. After months of searching he tracked down actress/model Maila Nurmi and in 1954 they created Vampira. An overnight, nationwide success, the oft-copied character was to remain popular for decades.

By the late 1950s Stromberg was a protégé of James Aubrey and followed him to CBS when he became top programming executive there, involved with such shows as The Beverly Hillbillies, Hogan's Heroes, Gilligan's Island, Green Acres, and Lost in Space. Due to corporate in-fighting, he brought about the cancellation of The Judy Garland Show, and together with Aubrey was ousted from CBS in 1965.

As an independent TV producer Stromberg turned to the horror genre and produced Frankenstein: The True Story in 1973, which is "Considered by many to be the finest film version of this classic tale." Following that project, he began work on a made-for-TV film adaptation of Jane Austen's Pride and Prejudice, which was never completed. (His father had produced the 1940 MGM adaptation of the novel, starring Laurence Olivier and Greer Garson.) In 1980 he executive produced The Curse of King Tut's Tomb and at the time of his death held the movie option for Robert Bloch's book Night of the Ripper.

Hunt Stromberg Jr. was married to Marilyn Elwell from 1947 to 1949. He died on November 24, 1986, in Los Angeles, California - where he was born - of a ruptured aneurysm.
