= K. K. Barrett =

American drummer

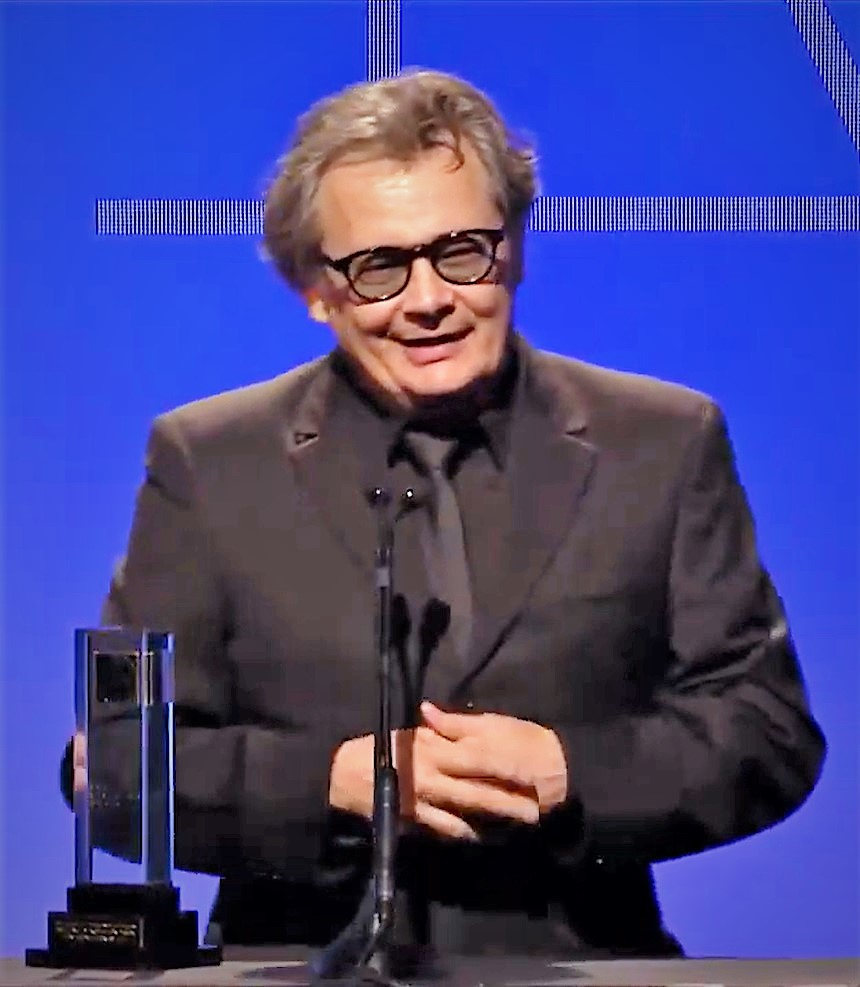
- Barrett receives award for Contemporary Feature Film at the Art Directors Guild show in 2014
- Born: Keith Barrett; 1952 (age 72–73); Omaha, Nebraska, United States
- Occupation: Production designer

Keith "K. K." Barrett (born 1952) is an American production designer known for his work on feature films by Spike Jonze and Sofia Coppola, among others.

== Early life ==
Barrett was born in Omaha, Nebraska. He lived in Springfield, Missouri and Oklahoma City, Oklahoma, before moving to Tulsa, Oklahoma. There, he spent his last two years of high school, and graduated from Memorial High School in 1971. He studied painting at Oklahoma State University, graduating in 1976. He lived in New York and in Los Angeles, where he was a drummer for The Screamers, an electropunk band. He appears in the 1986 punk rock musical Population: 1.

== Career ==
Barrett moved into production design on music videos (winning MTV awards for his work on "Tonight, Tonight" by Smashing Pumpkins and "The New Pollution" by Beck), and worked on videos with Spike Jonze, leading to their first film collaboration on Being John Malkovich. Together with set decorator Gene Serdena, he was nominated for the Academy Award for Best Production Design for the film Her (2013).

== Filmography ==
- Cheerleader Camp (1987)
- Crack House (1989)
- Being John Malkovich (1999)
- Human Nature (2001)
- Adaptation. (2002)
- Lost in Translation (2003)
- I Heart Huckabees (2004)
- Marie Antoinette (2006)
- Where the Wild Things Are (2009)
- Extremely Loud and Incredibly Close (2011)
- Her (2013)
- Woodshock (2016)
- The Goldfinch (2019)
- Birds of Prey (2020)
