= The Screamers =

American punk band

- Also known as: The Tupperwares
- Origin: Los Angeles, California, U.S.
- Genres: Punk rock, electropunk
- Years active: 1975–1981
- Label: Dangerhouse
- Past members: Tomata du Plenty; Tommy Gear; Rio de Janeiro; Pam Lillig; Ben Witz; Bill Rieflin; Eldon Hoke; K. K. Barrett; David Brown; Paul Roessler; Mark Andrews

"The Scream"
Sample of the Screamers "The Scream" (Rene Daalder, David Campbell demo) (1978).

The Screamers were an American electropunk group founded in 1975. They were among the first wave of the L.A. punk rock scene. The Los Angeles Times applied the label "techno-punk" to the band in 1978. In the documentary Punk: Attitude (2005), vocalist Jello Biafra of the Dead Kennedys cites the Screamers as a key influence on their group and as one of the great unrecorded groups in rock history.

The Screamers were noted for unusual instrumentation (a drummer and two keyboardists usually on ARP Odyssey synthesizer and Fender Rhodes electric piano). Additional musicians, including violinists and a female vocalist, were occasionally incorporated into their performances. The group featured a theatrical presentation that centered on manic lead vocalist, Tomata du Plenty. DuPlenty and Tommy Gear, a keyboard player and vocalist, were the band's principal songwriters.

== History ==
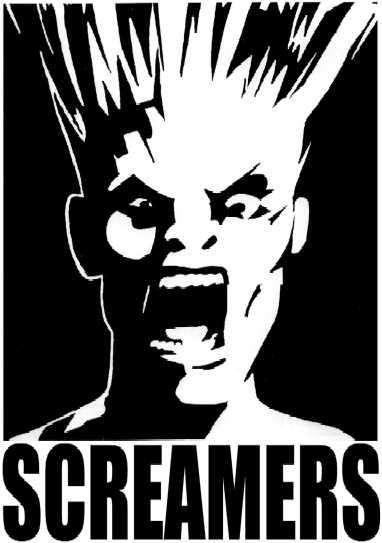
Logo designed by Gary Panter

The Screamers' founders Tomata du Plenty (born David Xavier Harrigan) and Tommy Gear first collaborated in Seattle in 1975, where they formed the Tupperwares. The original lineup of the Tupperwares included Tommy Gear (at the time, using the name "Melba Toast"), Tomata du Plenty, and Rio de Janeiro on vocals, backed by Pam Lillig and Ben witz (later of Girls), as well as Bill Rieflin (later of the Blackouts and Ministry) and a teenage Eldon Hoke (later known as "El Duce" of the Mentors).

In late 1976, after legal threats from Tupperware trademark owners, the band's name was changed to the Screamers. Tomata, Tommy, and Rio migrated to Los Angeles, leaving the other band members behind. Shortly after arriving in Los Angeles, Rio de Janeiro left the band due to creative differences and they added David Brown and drummer K. K. Barrett. Brown soon left to found the seminal punk label Dangerhouse Records; he was replaced by Paul Roessler.

The Screamers created a visual presence in the press before they ever played live. Studio photos of the band began to appear in magazines even before a full band had been assembled. Artist Gary Panter's logo for the band, a stylized cartoon of a screaming head with spiked hair, became one of the most recognizable images to emerge from punk rock.

From 1977 through 1979, the Screamers became a sensation in Los Angeles rock clubs, selling out multiple-night engagements at the Whisky a Go Go. They were the first punk band without a recording contract to headline the prestigious Roxy on Sunset Boulevard. They also did several short tours during this period, playing in New York, at CBGB and Hurrah, in '78 and '79.

Describing a July 1979 performance, music critic Robert Hilburn of the Los Angeles Times focused on "Tomata's extraordinary power on stage." According to Hilburn, "Tomata's hair was greased to stand straight up, giving him the look of a man who had just stuck his finger into an electric socket. His performance reflected the nervous, relentless anxiety of someone whose troubles are even deeper... by the end of the 40-minute set, du Plenty has gone through the same disintegration of the human will that we associate with such books as "1984." Eventually, the tuxedo jacket, shirt and tie are ripped off, leaving him symbolically naked in his attempt to maintain some dignity and individuality. As if suddenly put in another man's body, he asks in horror: "Who am I?"

The Screamers never released a single official recording of any kind, although several bootleg recordings have since appeared, composed of rehearsals or live tapes. At one point, the group determined they would release their debut album only in video form (a highly unusual approach before MTV existed or VCRs were common), and they devoted time and resources to constructing a small movie studio. Despite some fitful efforts in the early 1980s, the band had effectively dissolved before their video plans were realized. Roessler joined L.A.'s other "synthpunk" band, Nervous Gender. The other band members pursued non-musical careers, though K.K. Barrett reunited with Roessler to perform several Screamers songs live in late 2000, in tribute to Tomata du Plenty, who had recently died in San Francisco in August 2000.

== Recordings ==
Their most well known song, "122 Hours of Fear" was inspired by the hijacking of Lufthansa Flight 181. Their other notable song is "Vertigo", a song about insanity.

In 2004, Target Video released a DVD of a Screamers concert from 1978, filmed at the Mabuhay Gardens in San Francisco and appended several early Screamers music videos shot at the Target studio around the same time. Unauthorized live recordings and demo tapes of the Screamers circulate as bootlegs.

Their song "Peer Pressure" is featured on the 2010 compilation Black Hole: Jon Savage Presents/California Punk 1977–1980.

== In popular culture ==
Tomata du Plenty starred in the 1986 punk rock musical Population: 1. The October 2008 release of Population: 1 on DVD features a bonus disc of rare Screamers concert footage.

A poster advertising a Screamers show is featured in the hallway (along with many other band's posters) of the house in the film Laurel Canyon.

The Screamers were a large influence on hardcore bands like Dead Kennedys and the Germs, along with other synthpunk groups like the Units and Mindless Self Indulgence.

== Releases ==
- The Scream (Acetate) 1979 - (For the Rodney on the ROQ radio show, only 2 known copies).
- Live In San Francisco (VHS) - Target Video of a September 2, 1978 live concert at the Mabuhay Gardens.
- Screamers Demo Hollywood 1977 (EP) - Released by Superior Viaduct 2021
