= Dean Riesner =

American screenwriter

Dean Reisner
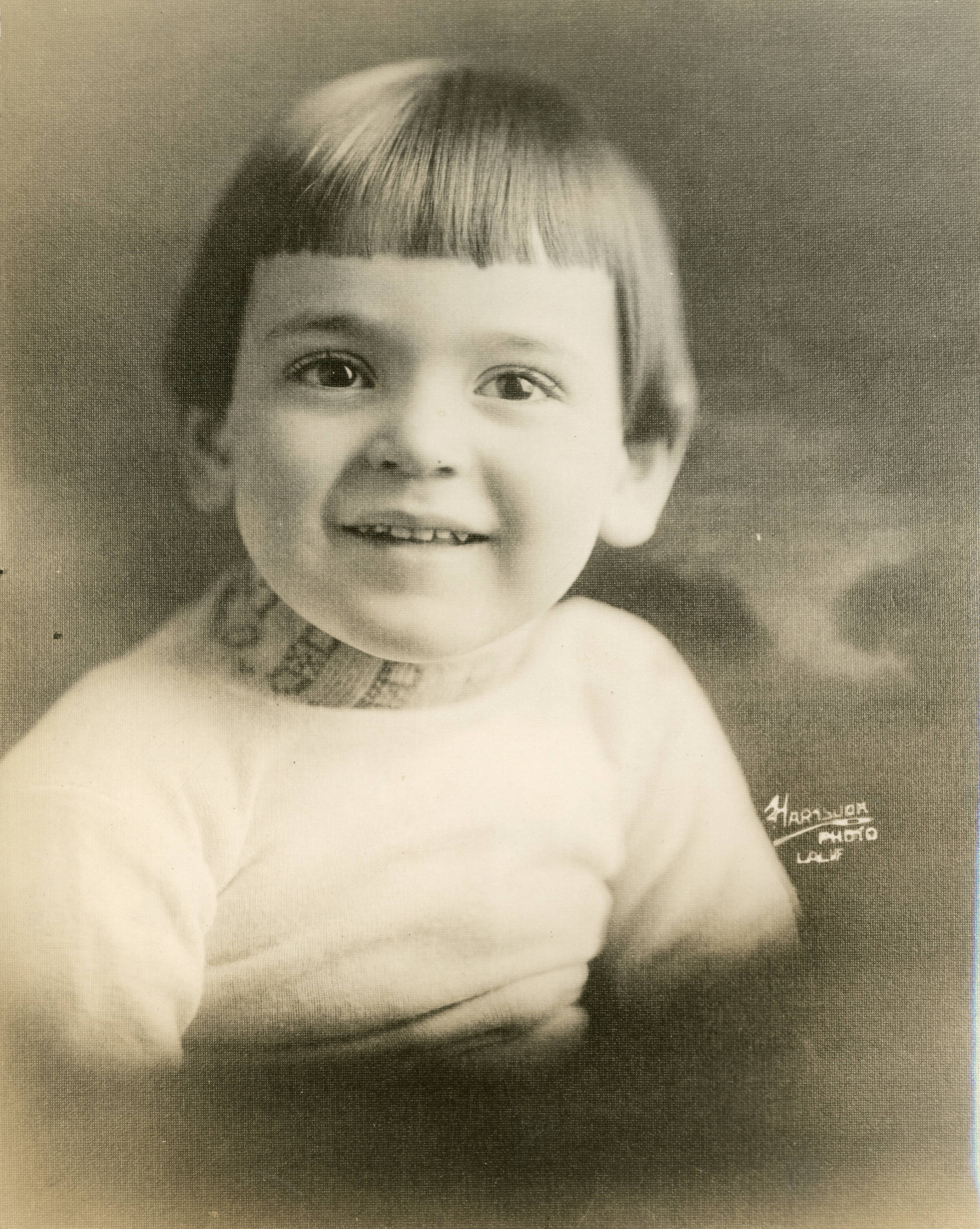
- Reisner in 1923
- Born: November 3, 1918; New Rochelle, New York, United States
- Died: August 18, 2002 (aged 83); Encino, California, United States
- Occupations: Screenwriter, television writer
- Years active: 1941–1991
- Spouse: Maila Nurmi (1949–1950s)

Dean Riesner (November 3, 1918 – August 18, 2002) was an American actor and film and television writer.

== Biography ==
Riesner was born in New Rochelle, New York. His father, Charles Reisner, was a German American silent film director, and Dean began acting in films at the age of four as Dinky Dean. His most notable role was in Charlie Chaplin's 1923 film The Pilgrim. His career at this young age ended because his mother wanted her son to have a real childhood. As an adult, his first job in films was as a co-writer of the 1939 Ronald Reagan movie Code of the Secret Service.

Riesner won an Oscar for directing Bill and Coo (1948), a feature film with a cast of real birds, costumed as humans, acting on the world's smallest film set.

Throughout the 1950s and 1960s, Riesner worked primarily in television, including writing for Rawhide and the "Tourist Attraction" episode of The Outer Limits, although he occasionally contributed to feature films like The Helen Morgan Story. In 1968 he landed a job working on the Clint Eastwood action film Coogan's Bluff, and this in turn would lead to him writing several other Eastwood features throughout the 1970s. Riesner helped pen the screenplays for two Eastwood films in 1971, Play Misty for Me and the original Dirty Harry. In 1973 he provided an uncredited rewrite for High Plains Drifter, and in 1976, he was one of the writers to draft The Enforcer, the third Dirty Harry thriller. That same year he provided the teleplay for ABC's highly rated miniseries Rich Man, Poor Man, starring Peter Strauss and Nick Nolte. In 1979, he wrote an early draft screenplay for The Godfather Part III, but his script was discarded when Francis Ford Coppola and Mario Puzo agreed to collaborate on a third entry in the series.

Riesner continued to write into the 1980s, but most of his work from that period went uncredited. These films include Das Boot, The Sting II, Blue Thunder and Starman. He is a credited screenwriter for Fatal Beauty along with Hilary Henkin.

Riesner married actress Maila Nurmi, better known as the horror hostess Vampira, in 1949. They divorced in the 1950s. Riesner died in 2002 of natural causes in Encino, California.
