= Rebel Without a Cause =

1955 American film directed by Nicholas Ray

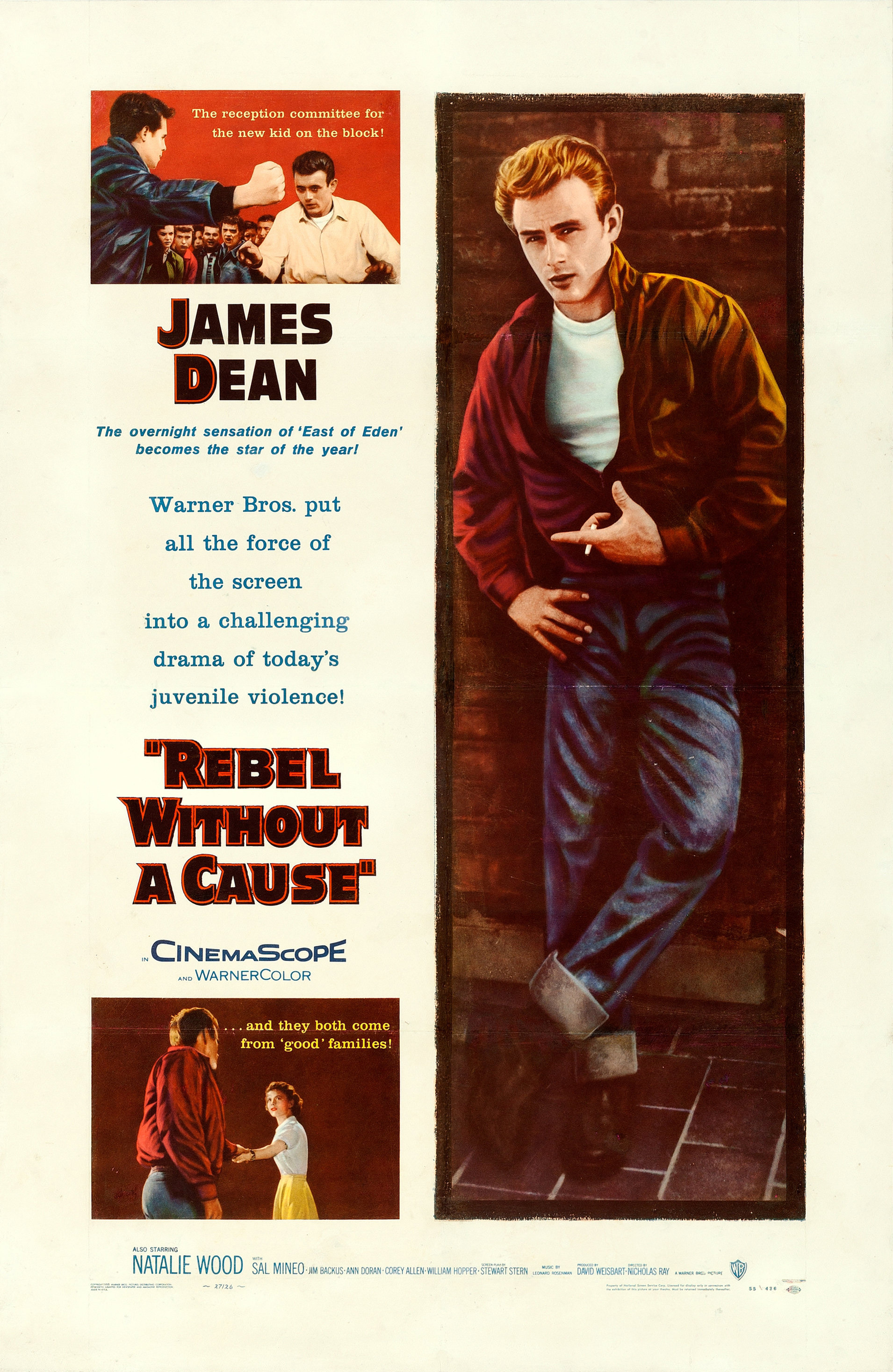
- Theatrical release poster
- Directed by: Nicholas Ray
- Screenplay by: Stewart Stern; Irving Shulman (adaptation)
- Story by: Nicholas Ray
- Produced by: David Weisbart
- Starring: James Dean; Natalie Wood; Sal Mineo; Jim Backus; Ann Doran; Corey Allen; William Hopper
- Cinematography: Ernest Haller
- Edited by: William H. Ziegler
- Music by: Leonard Rosenman
- Production company: Warner Bros. Pictures
- Distributed by: Warner Bros. Pictures
- Release date: October 27, 1955
- Running time: 111 minutes
- Country: United States
- Language: English
- Budget: $1.5 million
- Box office: $4.5 million (US rentals)

Rebel Without a Cause is a 1955 American coming-of-age melodrama film, directed by Nicholas Ray. The film stars James Dean, Natalie Wood, Sal Mineo, Jim Backus, Ann Doran, Corey Allen, William Hopper, and Nick Adams. It is also the film debut of Dennis Hopper, albeit in a minor role. It was filmed in the then recently introduced CinemaScope format. Focusing on emotionally confused suburban, middle-class teenagers, the film offers both social commentary and an alternative to previous films depicting delinquents in urban slum environments.

The film was an attempt to portray the moral decay of American youth, critique parental styles, and explore the differences and conflicts between generations, namely the Interbellum Generation and the Silent Generation. The title was adopted from psychologist Robert M. Lindner's 1944 book, Rebel Without a Cause: The Hypnoanalysis of a Criminal Psychopath, although the film itself does not make any other references to Lindner's book. Warner Bros. Pictures released the film on October 27, 1955, nearly a month after Dean's death in a car crash on September 30, 1955.

Over the years, the film has achieved landmark status for the performance of Dean, fresh from his Oscar-nominated role in East of Eden, in his most celebrated role. This was the only film of Dean's in which he received top billing. In 1990, Rebel Without a Cause was selected for preservation in the Library of Congress's National Film Registry as being deemed "culturally, historically, and aesthetically significant".

== Plot ==
In Los Angeles during the mid-1950s, teenager Jim Stark is arrested and taken to the juvenile division of a police station for public intoxication. At the station he crosses paths with John "Plato" Crawford, who was brought in for killing a litter of puppies, and Judy, who was brought in for curfew violation. The three separately reveal their innermost frustrations to the officers; all three of them suffer from problems at home. Jim feels anguished by his constantly bickering parents, Frank and Carol, but even more so by his timid father's failure to stand up to Carol; the issues are further complicated by Frank's interfering mother. His frustrations are made manifest to officer Ray Fremick when Jim is released to their custody.

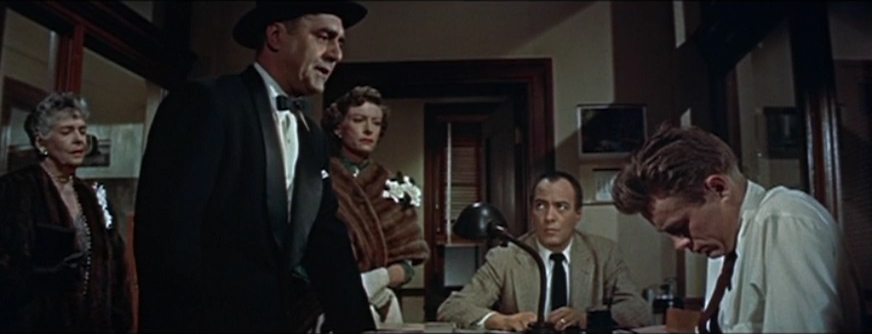
Jim Stark in police custody

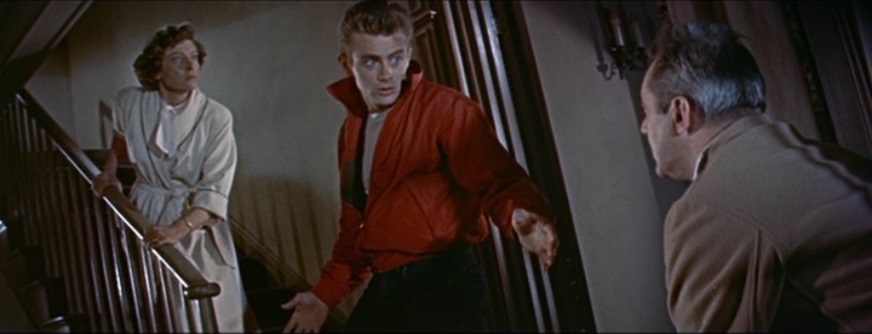
Jim confronts his father while his mother watches

Judy is convinced that her father ignores her because she is no longer a little girl, so she dresses up in racy clothes to get attention, which only causes her father to call her a "dirty tramp", while Plato's father abandoned his family when he was a toddler, and his mother is often away from home, leaving Plato in the care of his housekeeper.

On the way to his first day at Dawson High, Jim again meets Judy and offers her a ride. Seemingly unimpressed by Jim, she declines and is instead picked up by her "friends", a gang of delinquents led by Buzz Gunderson whom Judy is also dating. Jim is shunned by the rest of the student body but is befriended by Plato, who comes to idolize Jim.

After a field trip to Griffith Observatory, Buzz provokes and challenges Jim to a knife fight; Jim bests Buzz by knocking his switchblade out of his hand, then throws his own blade away. To preserve his status as gang leader, Buzz suggests stealing some cars to have a "Chickie Run" at a seaside cliff. At home, Jim ambiguously asks his father about defending one's honor in a dangerous situation, but Frank advises him against confrontation of any kind. That night, during the chickie run, Buzz plunges to his death when the strap on his jacket sleeve becomes entangled with his door-latch lever, preventing him from exiting the car. As police approach, the gang flees, leaving Judy behind, but Jim persuades her to leave with him and Plato.

Original trailer of the film

Jim later confides to his parents his involvement in the crash and considers turning himself in. When Carol declares they are moving again, Jim pleads with Frank to stand up for him. When Frank refuses, Jim attacks him in frustration, then storms off to the police station to confess, only to be turned away by the desk sergeant. Jim drives back home, finding Judy waiting for him. She apologizes for her prior treatment of him due to peer pressure, and the two begin to fall in love. Agreeing to never return to their respective homes, Jim suggests they visit an old deserted mansion Plato told him about.

Meanwhile, Plato is intercepted by three members of Buzz's gang, who are convinced that Jim betrayed them to the police. They steal Plato's address book and pursue Jim; Plato retrieves his mother's gun and leaves to warn Jim and Judy, finding them at the mansion. The three new friends act out a fantasy as a family. Plato then falls asleep, and Jim and Judy leave to explore the mansion, where they share their first kiss. Buzz's gang find and wake up Plato, who, frightened and distraught, shoots and wounds one of the gang. When Jim returns, he attempts to restrain Plato, who flees, accusing Jim of abandoning him.

Plato runs to the observatory and barricades himself inside as more police converge including Fremick who, along with Frank and Carol, has been searching for Jim. Jim and Judy follow Plato into the observatory, where Jim persuades Plato to trade the gun for his red jacket; Jim quietly removes the ammunition before returning it, and then convinces Plato to come outside. When the police notice that Plato still has the gun, they shoot Plato dead as he charges them, unaware that Jim had removed the bullets. Frank comforts his grieving son, vowing to be a better father. Now reconciled with his parents, Jim introduces them to Judy.

== Cast ==
- James Dean as James "Jim" Stark
- Natalie Wood as Judy
- Sal Mineo as John "Plato" Crawford
- Jim Backus as Frank Stark
- Ann Doran as Carol Stark
- Corey Allen as Buzz Gunderson
- William Hopper as Judy's father
- Rochelle Hudson as Judy's mother
- Dennis Hopper as Goon
- Edward Platt as Inspector Ray Fremick
- Steffi Sidney as Mil
- Marietta Canty as the Crawford family maid
- Virginia Brissac as Grandma Stark
- Beverly Long as Helen
- Ian Wolfe as Dr. Minton, lecturer at planetarium
- Frank Mazzola as Crunch
- Robert Foulk as Gene
- Jack Simmons as Cookie
- Tom Bernard as Harry
- Nick Adams as Chick
- Jack Grinnage as Moose
- Clifford Morris as Cliff

== Production ==
=== Background ===
Warner Brothers had bought the rights to Lindner's book, intending to use the title for a film. Attempts to create a film version in the late 1940s eventually ended without a film or even a full script being produced. When Marlon Brando did a five-minute screen test for the studio in 1947, he was given fragments of one of the partial scripts. However, Brando was not auditioning for Rebel Without a Cause, and there was no offer of any part made by the studio. The film, as it later appeared, was the result of a totally new script written in the 1950s that had nothing to do with the Brando test. The screen test is included on a 2006 special edition DVD of the 1951 film A Streetcar Named Desire.

Irving Shulman, who adapted Nicholas Ray's initial film story into the screenplay, had considered changing the name of James Dean's character to Herman Deville, according to Jurgen Muller's Movies of the '50s. He originally had written a number of scenes that were shot and later cut from the final version of the film. According to an AFI interview with Stewart Stern, with whom Shulman worked on the screenplay, one of the scenes was thought to be too emotionally provocative to be included in the final print of the film. It portrayed the character of Jim Stark inebriated to the point of belligerence screaming at a car in the parking lot "It's a little jeep jeep! Little jeep, jeep!" The scene was considered unproductive to the story's progression by head editor William H. Ziegler and ultimately was cut. In 2006, members of the Film Society of Lincoln Center petitioned to have the scene printed and archived for historical preservation.

Nicholas Ray conducted extensive research months before filming commenced, including weeks spent travelling the country with screenwriter Stewart Stern in which they interviewed hundreds of police officers, judges, youth leaders, juvenile authorities, and welfare agency managers to gather material for the film. One of the experts who advised them was Dr. Douglas Kelley, who had gained post-WWII renown after serving as the chief psychiatrist interviewing Nazi prisoners, including Hermann Göring, prior to their Nuremberg Trials. Ray wanted to consult him on the criminological soundness of the screenplay. Ray stated his intention for the film was to "do a movie about the kids next door" as opposed to delinquent-themed films of the time set in a "slum condition", adding that Rebel was to be about "middle-class kids, kids like my own, not kids from the wrong side of the tracks."

=== Casting ===
Nicholas Ray had considered Debbie Reynolds, Margaret O'Brien, Kathryn Grant and Pat Crowley for the role of Judy, before selecting Natalie Wood. According to a biography of Natalie Wood, she almost did not get the role because Nicholas Ray thought that she did not fit the role of the wild teen character. While on a night out with friends, she was in a car accident. Upon hearing this, Ray rushed to the hospital. While in delirium, Wood overheard the doctor murmuring and calling her a "goddamn juvenile delinquent"; she soon yelled to Ray, "Did you hear what he called me, Nick?! He called me a goddamn juvenile delinquent! Now do I get the part?!"

Sal Mineo would later note in a 1972 interview that the character of Plato Crawford was intended to have been gay. Speaking to Boze Hadleigh, he said, "[It m]akes sense [that Plato was killed off]: he was, in a way, the first gay teenager in films. You watch it now, you know he had the hots for James Dean. You watch it now, and everyone knows about Jimmy['s bisexuality], so it's like he had the hots for Natalie [Wood] and me. Ergo, I had to be bumped off, out of the way."

=== Filming ===
The film was in production from March 28 to May 26, 1955. When production began, Warner Bros. considered it a B-movie project, and Ray used black-and-white film stock. When Jack L. Warner realized James Dean was a rising star and a hot property, filming was switched to color stock, and many scenes had to be reshot in color. It was shot in the widescreen CinemaScope format, which had been introduced two years previously. With its densely expressive images, the film has been called a "landmark ... a quantum leap forward in the artistic and technical evolution of a format."

Exterior scenes at the abandoned mansion to which the characters retreat were filmed at the William O. Jenkins House, previously used in the film Sunset Boulevard (1950). It was demolished just two years after filming.

Dawson High School, the school in the film, was actually Santa Monica High School, located in Santa Monica, California.

=== Music ===
Leonard Rosenman, who composed the film's score, had previously worked with Dean on East of Eden, and he played a role in introducing the composer to Hollywood filmmaking. The score has continued to receive attention beyond the film's original release. The Los Angeles Philharmonic has performed a suite of Rosenman's music and has presented screenings of the film accompanied by a live orchestral performance of the score.

== Reception ==
On the review aggregator website Rotten Tomatoes, 91% of 85 critics' reviews are positive. The website's consensus reads: "Rebel Without a Cause is a searing melodrama featuring keen insight into '50s juvenile attitude and James Dean's cool, iconic performance." Metacritic, which uses a weighted average, assigned the film a score of 89 out of 100, based on 19 critics, indicating "universal acclaim".

Natalie Wood, Sal Mineo, and Nicholas Ray were nominated for Academy Awards for their roles in Rebel Without a Cause, which grossed $7,197,000 (equivalent to $86.5 million in 2025) in domestic and overseas screenings, making it Warner Bros.' second-biggest box-office draw that year. James Dean was also nominated posthumously, albeit for his other 1955 film, East of Eden. (Academy rules prevent an actor from potentially being nominated for more than one film per category.)

The movie opened to mixed reviews when it was released on October 27, 1955, less than a month after Dean, whose performance was praised all around by film critics, died on September 30. William Zinsser wrote a scathing review of Rebel in his New York Herald Tribune column, concluding his summary of the film's plot with the words, "All this takes two hours, but it seems more like two days. The movie is written and acted so ineptly, directed so sluggishly, that all names but one will be omitted here. The exception is Dean, the gifted young actor who was killed last month. His rare talent and appealing personality even shine through this turgid melodrama."

Bosley Crowther, writing in The New York Times, described Rebel Without a Cause as "violent, brutal and disturbing", and as an excessively graphic depiction of teenagers and their "weird ways". He referred to a "horrifying duel with switchblades", a "brutal scene", and a "shocking presentation" of a race in stolen automobiles. Although he admitted that there are moments of accuracy and truth in the film, he found these "excruciating", and discerned a "pictorial slickness" in the production's use of the CinemaScope process and its filming in the widescreen format, a slickness he declared was at odds with the realism of Ray's directing. Crowther was not impressed by James Dean's acting, and cited the various mannerisms he believed Dean copied from Marlon Brando, asserting that "Never have we seen a performer so clearly follow another's style" and calling Dean's interpretation of the Jim Stark role a "clumsy display".

Reviewer Jack Moffitt of The Hollywood Reporter, who correctly thought the film would be a money maker, wrote a less critical, more laudatory review. He found the acting of James Dean, Natalie Wood, and Sal Mineo to be "extraordinarily good", and the direction by Nicholas Ray to be "outstanding". He praised the realistic manner in which Ray depicted the police station scenes and the engaging manner, according to Moffitt, in which he captured the nihilism of the teenage subculture for his audience. Moffitt took issue with the underlying ideology of the film, especially its implication, as he saw it, that professional bureaucrats could better guide youth than the American family unit itself. He criticized the film for overgeneralizing, calling this aspect a "convenient cliche", and summed up his review by describing the film as "a superficial treatment of a vital problem that has been staged brilliantly".

Robert J. Landry, managing editor of Variety magazine at the time, wrote a review published on October 26. He described Rebel as a "fairly exciting, suspenseful and provocative, if also occasionally far-fetched, melodrama of unhappy youth on another delinquency kick." Unlike some movie critics, Landry thought that James Dean, under the influence of Nicholas Ray's direction, had mostly freed his acting of the mannerisms characteristic of Marlon Brando's style, and that his performance in the movie was "very effective". He praised Dean's interpretation of a maladjusted teenager, noting his ability "to get inside the skin" of his character as "not often encountered".

Wanda Hale of the New York Daily News found fault with Rebel's depiction, in her view, of its adults as cardboard figures and of its middle-class teenagers as hoodlums, arguing that it lacked credibility and that "[a]s an honest purposeful drama of juvenile hardness and violence the film just doesn't measure up." On the other hand, she praised James Dean's acting, writing, "[w]ith complete control of the character, he gives a fine, sensitive performance of an unhappy, lonely teenager, tormented by the knowledge of his emotional instability."

== Accolades ==
Award	Category	Nominee(s)	Result	Ref.
Academy Awards	Best Supporting Actor	Sal Mineo	Nominated	
Academy Awards	Best Supporting Actress	Natalie Wood	Nominated	
Academy Awards	Best Motion Picture Story	Nicholas Ray	Nominated	
British Academy Film Awards	Best Film		Nominated	
British Academy Film Awards	Best Foreign Actor	James Dean	Nominated	
Cahiers du Cinéma	Best Film	Nicholas Ray	Nominated	
Golden Globe Awards	Most Promising Newcomer – Female	Natalie Wood	Won (Note: Tied with Carroll Baker (Baby Doll & Giant) and Jayne Mansfield (The Girl Can't Help It).)	
National Film Preservation Board	National Film Registry		Inducted	
Online Film & Television Association Awards	Film Hall of Fame: Productions		Won	
Saturn Awards	Best DVD or Blu-ray Collection	James Dean Ultimate Collector's Collection	Nominated	

American Film Institute recognition

- 1998 AFI's 100 Years... 100 Movies #59
- 2005 AFI's 100 Years... 100 Movie Quotes
  - "You're tearing me apart!" Nominated

Empire magazine recognition

- Ranked 477th on list of the 500 greatest movies of all time in 2008.

== Controversies ==
=== Censorship ===
Rebel was censored in Britain by the British Board of Film Censors and released with scenes cut and an X-rating. Most of the knife fight was excised and not shown on British screens until 1967. The film was banned in New Zealand in 1955 by Chief Censor Gordon Mirams, out of fears that it would incite "teenage delinquency", only to be released on appeal the following year with scenes cut and an R16 rating. Rebel was also banned in Spain, where it had to be smuggled into the country for private screenings, and was not officially released there until 1964.

Even before its release, Rebel faced potential issues with censorship due to its violent scenes. James Dean, after he completed filming, commented on the possible censorship of Rebel, saying that the censors would be "doing the country an injustice," and stated that: "Since juvenile delinquency is based on violence, it is justified violence. We picture a very real situation that exists in this country—something that should be stamped out. Movies like The Blackboard Jungle and Rebel can help."

== Legacy ==
Rebel Without a Cause is closely tied with the rise in youth culture during the mid-1950s, in which teenagers became seen as "a distinct social group". The box office successes of Rebel and Blackboard Jungle in 1955 caused a "chain reaction" in Hollywood, according to Army Archerd, who wrote that every Hollywood studio after was "making films on the same subject, with varying degrees of violence, humor, or rock 'n' roll music."

The switchblade James Dean's character used in the fight scene at Griffith Observatory was offered at auction on September 30, 2015, by Profiles in History with an estimated value of US$12,000 to $15,000; the winning bid was US$12,000. Also offered at the same auction were production photographs and a final shooting script dated August 17, 1955 for a behind-the-scenes television promotional film titled Behind the Cameras: Rebel Without a Cause hosted by Gig Young and that had scripted interviews and staged footage by the cast and crew (script winning bid US$225.) The 1949 Mercury two-door sedan James Dean drove in the movie is part of the permanent collection at the National Automobile Museum in Reno, Nevada.

== In popular culture ==
=== Music ===
- The 1980 Bruce Springsteen song "Cadillac Ranch" contains the lyric, "James Dean in that Mercury '49" as one of the people meeting at the Cadillac Ranch.
- The music video for the 1991 Paula Abdul song, "Rush Rush", reimagined the film with Keanu Reeves as Jim (James Dean) and Abdul as Judy (Natalie Wood).
- In 2022 Morrissey released the single "Rebels Without Applause" for his unreleased album Bonfire of Teenagers - the single's title is a nod to the title of the film

=== Film ===
- Tommy Wiseau borrowed James Dean's line "You're tearing me apart" from Rebel Without a Cause, and used it in his 2003 cult film The Room, widely considered to be one of the worst films ever made. In the original script for Wiseau's movie, it was written as "You're taking me apart, Lisa", a reference to Dean's line.
- In the 2016 film La La Land, Rebel Without a Cause is referenced briefly. Ryan Gosling's character Sebastian makes references to the film's ending where James Dean yells, "I got the bullets" when Emma Stone's character Mia discusses a callback for her audition. Later, the two of them are seen at the Rialto Theatre watching the opening of the film.

=== Theater ===
In 2005, an off-Broadway stage production opened at the American Theatre of Actors in New York, featuring Allie Mulholland and Aubrey Plaza in their stage debuts in the lead roles.

=== Television ===
- The Sopranos episode "Big Girls Don't Cry" features Christopher Moltisanti performing the scene where Plato is killed during his "Acting for Writers" class.
- According to The O.C. executive producer Stephanie Savage, the film was a "big reference" for the second episode of the drama series ("The Model Home"), in which Seth and Marissa hide Ryan in a vacant house. Savage also noted that the dynamic of the three characters (Ryan, Marissa, and Seth) reminded her of the film's three leads (Jim, Judy, and Plato).

== See also ==
- List of American films of 1955
- List of cult films
- List of hood films
