= The Stepford Children =

- Original print ad for the TV broadcast
- Genre: Horror; Sci-Fi; Thriller
- Based on: The Stepford Wives by Ira Levin
- Written by: Bill Bleich
- Directed by: Alan J. Levi
- Starring: Barbara Eden; Don Murray; Tammy Lauren; Pat Corley; Richard Anderson
- Music by: Joseph Conlan
- Country of origin: United States
- Original language: English

Production
- Executive producers: Edgar J. Scherick; Gary Hoffman
- Producer: Paul Pompian
- Cinematography: Steve Shaw
- Editor: Michael Berman
- Running time: 96 minutes
- Production companies: Edgar J. Scherick Associates; Taft Entertainment Television

Original release
- Network: NBC
- Release: March 15, 1987

Related
- Revenge of the Stepford Wives; The Stepford Husbands

The Stepford Children is a 1987 American made-for-television horror science fiction thriller film inspired by the Ira Levin novel The Stepford Wives. It was directed by Alan J. Levi with a screenplay by Bill Bleich and starring Barbara Eden, Don Murray, Tammy Lauren, Randall Batinkoff and Pat Corley. It is the second in a series of sequels inspired by the 1972 novel and the original 1975 film The Stepford Wives.

== Plot ==
Laura and Steven Harding (Barbara Eden and Don Murray) move with their children to the town of Stepford, Connecticut where Steven had lived with his first wife who had died mysteriously. While Laura is occupied with passing the bar exam, Steven is disturbed by their children, athletic but unfocused David (Randall Batinkoff) and free-spirited, music loving Mary (Tammy Lauren). Steven joins the Men's Association, which is still assimilating their wives into robots. This time, they have begun to turn their out-of-control teens into robots as well. Once they are assimilated, the children are obedient, homework-loving, accomplished droids, but with little personality.

The Hardings befriend the Gregsons: Laura with sloppy and high-spirited mom, Sandy (Sharon Spelman), and David dates their sly-humored daughter, Lois (Debbie Barker), with whom he shares a love of motorcycles. Laura is confused when the principal discourages her plans to establish a PTA, and Mary feels unnerved by her passive classmates as well as (unknowingly) the methods used to collect her image, hair, and body information. At the school's Parents' Night, Laura becomes aware of the disconnection between her and Steven's parenting styles. She allows the children space, while he has become obsessed with a perfect image.

On the night of a dance, David, Mary, and Lois become suspicious when Sandy seemingly has changed, having become obsessed with cleaning and Bundt cakes. They make the best of the dance, playing rock music over the local choice of big band and easy listening/beautiful music, but cause a riot as the children dance awkwardly (never having been programmed to dance freestyle). The kids are arrested, but then released on Steven's and Mr. Gregson's vows to do something about them.

Lois calls David, upset, asking him to help her as all the men in town have gathered at her house and are "coming for her". They escape on their motorcycles, but Lois crashes when a car tries to run them off the road. David goes to the hospital where Lois lies entirely wrapped in bandages. When he sneaks into her room, he sees one of her limbs is missing in an unnatural manner as well as her vacant eyes, and he runs in fear.

The next day, Lois appears back to normal—but she is now a mindless double who dates a boy she previously had dismissed. David and Laura visit the Gregsons where she witnesses the change in Sandy as well. Next, Laura finds that Mary has also changed after an evening's "shopping trip" with Dad, losing all her individuality and even doing some ironing. Laura digs open the grave of Steven's first wife and finds an android in the coffin. Returning home, Laura learns Steven has taken David out for a "shopping trip" just before Mary's duplicate attacks her with a knife, but Laura is able to thwart the duplicate; as she throws it to the floor, it malfunctions.

Laura goes to the Men's Association to find David; while investigating a greenhouse, she discovers the true Mary strapped to a table. They are surrounded by Steven and the other Men's Club members, as well as the bodies of the town's children, who are going through a bizarre bio-organic process to make them into docile drones. They are then replaced by their robot doubles during the procedure. Having escaped from his father earlier, David bursts in on his motorcycle and causes a diversion, allowing Laura and Mary a reprieve.

As the Hardings escape, damage to the machines causes an explosion, which destroys the Men's Association, its members (including Steven), and the half-processed children, although two of them survive the explosion. Laura and the kids race out of town.

== Cast ==
- Barbara Eden as Laura Harding
- Don Murray as Steve Harding
- Tammy Lauren as Mary Harding
- Randall Batinkoff as David Harding
- Pat Corley as Sheriff Weston
- Ken Swofford as Frank Gregson
- Richard Anderson as Lawrence Denton
- Sharon Spelman as Sandy Gregson
- Raye Birk as George Larson
- Debbie Barker as Lois Gregson
- Dick Butkus as Tom Wilcox
- James Coco as Mr. Jamison
- John Cameron Mitchell as Kenny Moreland
- Judith Baldwin as Kimberly Summer
- Peter Elbing as Mr. Peterson
- Pam Newman as Lorraine Moreland
- James Staley as Mr. Moreland
- Toni Sawyer as Stepford Wife
- Jacqueline Lovejoy as Stepford Wife
- John Hostetter as Swimming Instructor

== Production notes ==
Judith Baldwin had a role in the original 1975 version of The Stepford Wives.

John Cameron Mitchell, who played Kenny, the boy kidnapped on the lake early in the film and then assimilated, would later become famous as the director and star of Hedwig and the Angry Inch.

The robots evolved from the original depiction in the first film, who closely resembled mannequins or the animatronics found at Disneyland. The advanced versions resemble "the Visible Man" toy, and this design was similarly recreated in the 2004 remake of The Stepford Wives.

Like the sequel Revenge of the Stepford Wives, the film was shot in California, as evidenced by "Canyon Road", which is not in Connecticut.

== Home media ==
The film was released on VHS under the Worldvision European label in the PAL format. In 2016, CBS Home Entertainment released the film as a burn-on-demand DVD in the U.S..
