= Melissa Newman (actress) =

American actress

- Occupation: Actress
- Years active: 1968–1985

Melissa Newman is an American actress who, as a teen, made her Hollywood film debut in The Undefeated (1969) American Civil War and Western film, starring John Wayne, Rock Hudson, Ben Johnson, Bruce Cabot, Edward Faulkner, Roman Gabriel, Lee Meriweather, Paul Fix, Robert Donner, Jan-Michael Vincent, Merlin Olsen, among others.

== Career ==
Newman's career after her 1969 film debut consisted of appearances in several television films and numerous TV series, such as Bonanza, Gunsmoke, Lou Grant, Starsky & Hutch, The New Perry Mason, Hawkins and the motion pictures of Getting Away from It All, River of Gold, and Revenge of the Stepford Wives.

She returned to the big screen in the 1983 film One Dark Night, after which, in 1985, she performed as a voice actress in the anime series Robotech and in the English dub version of the animated television movie, Time Patrol.

=== Roles ===
In the 1971 Bonanza episode "A Time to Die", she plays the role of Lori who is engaged to be married, while her mother Mrs. April Christopher (played by Vera Miles) is succumbing to the effects of a bite from a rabid wolf.

In the made-for-TV comedy movie Getting Away from It All (1972), she portrays April Brodey, the shapely cute bikini-clad daughter of the owner of the local store. She becomes enamored of Larry Hagman's character Fred Clark, and swims out to the island to give him and his wife Helen (Barbara Feldon) a tour of the property they have purchased.

Also in the 1972 episode of the long-running Western series Gunsmoke (1955–1975), of "The Wedding", she portrays 20-year-old Donna Clayton who wants to marry Corey Soames (played in one of his early roles by Sam Elliott). Newman (as Karen Guilfoyle) would again appear with co-star guest Sam Elliot (as Luther Wilkes) a year later in a 1973 episode of the legal drama series Hawkins which starred James ("Jimmy") Stewart, a rare TV role for him, however not as a love-interest.

Also in 1973, she had a role in the revival of the famed literary character and 1950s/1960s era TV icon of L.A. criminal defense attorney Perry Mason in the premiere episode of The New Perry Mason as Nita More, secretary to Jules Barron (Paul Richards), in which she had three scenes; in an office setting, out and about with Mason's snooping detective / investigator Paul Drake, and on the stand testifying in a courtroom setting.

Three years later, in 1976 she plays Amy, a café waitress, who tips off wild car-driving detectives Starsky & Hutch that a regular patron who is a security guard on an armored truck is late, and that she is worried enough to call the police.

Newman then plays Kim Ballard in the 1978 Lou Grant series about a big-city newspaper editor (Ed Asner) in the episode "Sect" as a woman who has come out of the Hare Krishna movement, while her brother remains with the sect.

Branching out into the mystery/thriller genre in Revenge of the Stepford Wives (1980), sequel to the earlier famous 1975 thriller film about the infamous Stepford Wives, she portrayed Muffin Sheridan, who interviews for the job of assistant to investigative reporter Kaye Foster (Sharon Gless), and has various scenes throughout the movie.

In 1983, she returned to the big-screen in the horror film One Dark Night as Mrs. Olivia McKenna, wife of Allan McKenna (portrayed by Adam West), and daughter of the villain, Karl Raymarseivich Raymar.

Newman was the voice of Dana Sterling in 1985 for 24 episodes of Robotech Part 2: The Masters. In the same year, she voiced Ginny in Time Patrol in which she is credited under the name of "Lisa Mannon", instead of Melissa Newman.

== Filmography ==
- The Ghost & Mrs. Muir (1968) (Season 1 Episode 9: "Way Off Broadway") as Nancy
- The Undefeated (1969) as Charlotte Langdon, 16-years old daughter of Confederate States Army Colonel James Langdon (Rock Hudson), leading a wagon train of Southerners after the defeat in the Civil War to exile in Mexico. She's pursued in ardor by love-sick suitor, Private "Bubba" Wilkes (Jan-Michael Vincent)
- Bracken's World (1970) (Season 1 Episode 23: "A Beginning, a Middle and an End") as Aileen Davies
- Julia (1970) (Season Episode 28: "The Switch Sitters") as Wilma
- Nanny and the Professor (1970) (Season 1 Episode 11: "The Games Families Play") as Carol
- Bonanza (1971) (Season 12 Episode 25: "A Time to Die") as Lori
- River of Gold (1971) as Julie
- The Jimmy Stewart Show (1971) as Ida Levin, college student
  - (Season 1 Episode: "By Way of Introduction")
  - (Season 1 Episode 14: "Cock-a-doodle Don't")
- Getting Away from It All (1972) as April Brodey
- Gunsmoke (1972) (Season 17 Episode 24: "The Wedding") as Donna Clayton
- Hawkins (1973) (Season 1 Episode 2: "Die, Darling, Die") as Karen Guilfoyle
- The New Perry Mason (1973) (Season 1 Episode 1: "The Case of the Cagey Cager") as Nita Moore
- Starsky & Hutch (1976) (Season 1 Episode 15: "The Hostages") as Amy
- Lou Grant (1978) (Season 1 Episode 18: "Sect") as Kim Ballard
- Revenge of the Stepford Wives (1980) as Muffin Sheridan
- One Dark Night (1983) as Olivia McKenna
- Robotech (1985) as Dana Sterling (Voice)
  - 24 Episodes in Part 2: "The Masters"
- Time Patrol (1985) as Ginny (Voice) (credited as Lisa Mannon)
