= Teaser trailer =

Type of film trailer

A teaser trailer, also shortened to teaser, is a short trailer and a form of teaser campaign advertising that focuses on film and television programming. It is a videography pre-release film or television show advertisement. Short in length, teaser trailers contain a little material from the advertised content to be released.

Frequently, they contain hinted, cryptic, curiosity-inducing messages. Methods of this nature are designed to pique audience interest and anticipation, as well as increase the hype of the advertised content before release of its trailer. The length of a teaser trailer is usually only around 20–30 seconds, noticeably shorter than the 2014 Cinema United guideline of two minutes for standard trailers. It is generally created during the shooting of the film or program and released before the completion of shooting.

== For films ==
Teaser trailer for The Public Enemy, showing no actual footage of the film

A teaser trailer is a short video segment related to an upcoming film, television program, video game, or similar, that is usually released long in advance of the product, so as to "tease" the audience; an early example of the teaser trailer was the one for the 1978 Superman film by Richard Donner, which was designed to re-invigorate interest on the part of potential movie-goers, for a film whose release had been delayed.

Film teasers are usually made for big-budget and popularly themed movies. Their purpose is less to tell the audience about a movie's content than simply to let them know that the movie is coming up in the near future, and to add to the hype of the upcoming release. Teaser trailers are often made while the film is still in production or being edited, and as a result they may feature scenes or alternate versions of scenes that are not in the finished film. Often they contain no dialogue and some — notably Pixar films — have scenes made for use in the trailer only. Some teaser trailers show a quick montage of scenes from the film. The average length of a teaser is less than a minute.

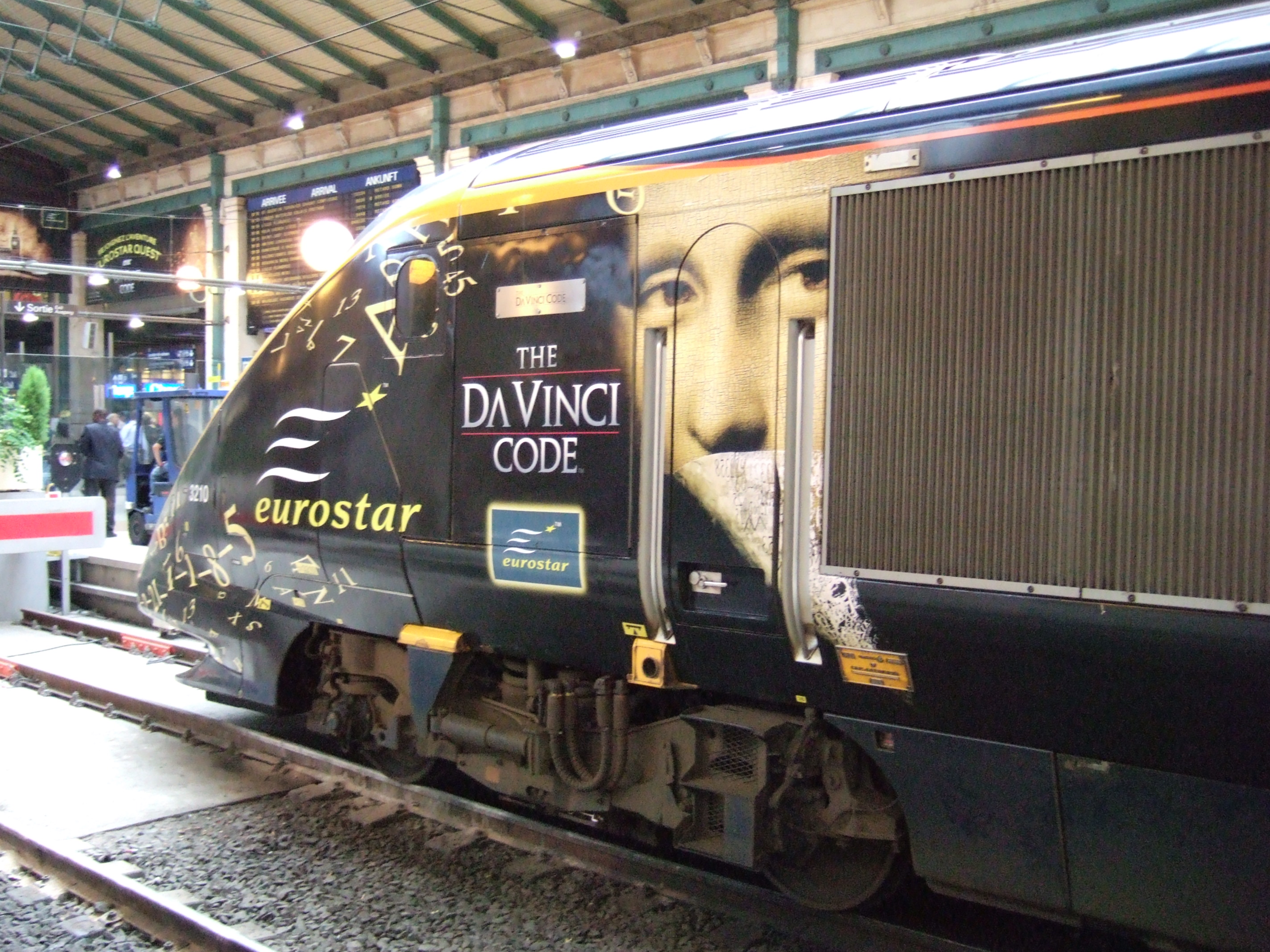
The Da Vinci Code Eurostar in Paris

Later examples of major motion picture events that used teaser trailers to gain hype are The Lord of the Rings trilogy, the Star Wars prequels, and the Spider-Man films. The Da Vinci Code teaser trailer was released even before a single frame of the movie had been shot. Harry Potter and the Half-Blood Prince's teaser debuted three months before its intended release date, but its delay to July 15, 2009, expanded the gap to a year.

When the first teaser for Star Wars: Episode I – The Phantom Menace was attached to the films The Siege, A Bug's Life and Meet Joe Black, it was reported that many people had paid for admission to the film just to watch the trailer and subsequently walked out after the trailer had been screened. Similarly, teasers for Star Wars: Episode II – Attack of the Clones and Star Wars: Episode III – Revenge of the Sith were shown before the Pixar films Monsters, Inc. and The Incredibles, respectively. The teaser trailer for Cloverfield was first publicly shown attached to the film Transformers; at that point, nothing about the former was known, and the one-and-a-half-minute teaser did not include the movie title; only the producer's name, J. J. Abrams, and a release date, 1.18.08, were shown. The teaser trailer for another film directed by Abrams, Star Trek, was attached to Cloverfield itself, depicting the starship USS Enterprise being constructed on Earth, and again showing no title, instead just showing the Starfleet Insignia; the Star Trek teaser trailer originally announced the release date as Christmas 2008, but the movie was eventually delayed to May 8, 2009, making the wait between the teaser trailer and the movie itself 16 months. Other teasers also do not explicitly display the film's title, but reveal it in the URL for the website.

Teasers often create hype in media to such extent that they get leaked. Avengers: Infinity War, 2.0 and KGF: Chapter 2 prove to be such examples. The teaser (the director's version) of 2.0 was released weeks before it was officially released on YouTube.

DVD and Blu-ray releases of movies will usually contain both their teaser and theatrical trailers as special features. One exception to this rule is Spider-Man, whose teaser trailer featured an unrelated plot of bank robbers escaping in a helicopter, getting caught from behind and propelled backward into what at first appears to be a net, then is shown to be a gigantic spider web spun between the two towers at the World Trade Center. This teaser was pulled from theaters following the September 11, 2001 attacks, but it can be viewed on YouTube.
