= Revenge of the Stepford Wives =

1980 film by Robert Fuest

- VHS cover
- Genre: Mystery; Sci-Fi; Thriller
- Based on: The Stepford Wives by Ira Levin
- Written by: David Wiltse
- Directed by: Robert Fuest
- Starring: Sharon Gless; Julie Kavner; Don Johnson; Audra Lindley; Arthur Hill; Mason Adams
- Original language: English

Production
- Executive producer: Edgar J. Scherick
- Producer: Scott Rudin
- Cinematography: Ric Waite
- Editor: Jerrold L. Ludwic
- Running time: 96 minutes

Original release
- Network: NBC
- Release: October 12, 1980

Related
- The Stepford Wives; The Stepford Children

Revenge of the Stepford Wives is a 1980 American made-for-television science-fiction thriller film inspired by the Ira Levin novel The Stepford Wives. It was directed by Robert Fuest with a screenplay by David Wiltse and starring Sharon Gless, Julie Kavner, Don Johnson, Arthur Hill, and Audra Lindley. It is the first in a series of sequels inspired by the 1972 novel and the original 1975 film The Stepford Wives.

== Plot ==
Set 10 years after the original film, a prologue sets the scene as a couple unhappy in idyllic Stepford, Connecticut, attempts to leave town; they are killed by the police chief.

Spirited investigative TV reporter Kaye Foster (Gless) arrives in Stepford to cover a story about the American town with the lowest crime and divorce rates, as well as the tightest real-estate market in the country. She immediately notices the beautiful, but compliant and domestic women of the town, who take a pill four times a day when an eerie siren sounds (they each claim it is for a thyroid condition). Kaye meets Megan and Andy Brady (Kavner and Johnson), newcomers to town. Megan is refreshingly down to earth, and Andy is interviewing to join the police force and become a member of the Stepford Men's Association, headed by refined but vaguely hostile Dale "Diz" Coba (Hill). Kaye needs a research assistant, and after being turned off by the seemingly plastic and subservient women of Stepford, she jumps at the chance to hire Megan.

Kaye is shaken when Barbara Parkinson (Lindley) "accidentally" nearly runs her down with her car, then exhibits strange, repetitive behaviors at the accident site, yet has no recollection of the incident the next day. Disillusioned hotel manager Wally (Adams) seems guiltily on the verge of divulging something important to Kaye about his wife's inability to change, when another attempt is made on Kaye's life.

Andy assumes the job with the Stepford Police, and Megan has chosen a house when she is sent to the Men's Association and disappears for a few days. Suspicious, Kaye sneaks into a garden party at the association attended by the townswomen; there, three new "sisters" are welcomed, including Megan. All three wear the frilly and outdated fashions that are so popular in town and exhibit the brainless behaviors of the other wives. Kaye overhears Diz explaining to the husbands that the wives have been brainwashed and kept compliant by the "thyroid pills". To keep them subservient, they must not drink alcohol, miss the medication, or be overstimulated, or the women will become hostile and potentially violent. Kaye is discovered and narrowly escapes, and the men set out to track her down.

Kaye shows up at Megan's house, throws out her pills, and compels her to down some vodka. At first, Megan attempts to stab Kaye and manically clean the house. Overcome, she later recovers and the two women knock out Andy. Kaye, now disguised as a Stepford wife, enlists the aide of Wally to help them escape; he betrays them, but having anticipated this, Kaye manages to elude him. However, their plan to escape by train fails, and Megan is taken to the Men's Association for reconditioning. Eventually, Kaye arrives and holds Diz at gunpoint while Megan repeatedly sounds the pill siren. All the women of the town overdose on their pills, becoming disoriented and then violent. Having second thoughts about the scheme, Andy shows up in time to reconcile and escape with Megan. Kaye is finally caught by Diz, though, and just as he is about to kill her, he is confronted by the vengeful women of the town. Screaming and clawing, they push him over a balcony, trample him, and literally tear him apart. Shocked and horrified, Kaye makes her escape.

== Cast ==
- Sharon Gless as Kaye Foster
- Julie Kavner as Megan Brady
- Audra Lindley as Barbara Parkinson
- Don Johnson as Officer Andy Brady
- Mason Adams as Wally
- Arthur Hill as Gale 'Diz' Corbett
- Gay Rowan as Angeline
- Howard Witt as Police Chief
- Peter Maloney as Henry the druggist
- Melissa Newman as Muffin Sheridan

== Production ==
The film first aired on October 12, 1980. Despite the suburban Connecticut setting, it was filmed in California as is evident by the presence of palm trees and canyons.

This is the first sequel in a string of stories suggested by, but not necessarily true to, the original concept of the novel. Although the feel, costumes, and even music suggest the original film, a new and different twist is written for the sequel. Later sequels include The Stepford Children (1987), which retained the concept of the original, but in which the men were also transforming the children of Stepford. The sequel The Stepford Husbands revisits the concept, but reverses the roles, with the women as the oppressors. Louise Fletcher's role, in particular, recalls the role of Diz, the Men's Association president. A 2004 remake began with the same concept, but changed significant elements and was made with an entirely different tone and ending. The executive producer for the film was Edgar J. Scherick, who produced the first film.

== Home video ==
After its initial airing on television, the film had a 1989 VHS release by Embassy Home Entertainment. The film, like the other two television sequels, has yet had no release on DVD or Blu-ray.

== Reception ==
One review of the film describes Revenge as "an average telefilm sequel [which] isn't that bad, but isn't much memorable, either." Another generally rates it as mediocre, though praises the end of the film, but remarking, "Despite this more satisfying ending, however, the intelligence of the audience is further insulted by the fact that the credits roll directly thereafter, leaving us with nothing to explain Coba’s methods or the fallout that would naturally occur after these events. Wouldn’t it be interesting to see the women confront their husbands following their deprogramming? Wouldn’t we like to see Kate’s [sic] triumph as she tells the story of Stepford to her TV audience?" While acknowledging the value of an ambiguous ending, "there's a difference between mystery and confusion." The film was nominated for an Edgar Allan Poe Award in 1981 for Best Television Feature or Miniseries to writer David Wiltse.
