= The Stepford Husbands =

1996 American made-for-television film

- Genre: Science fiction thriller
- Based on: The Stepford Wives by Ira Levin
- Written by: Ken and Jim Wheat
- Directed by: Fred Walton
- Starring: Donna Mills; Michael Ontkean; Cindy Williams; Sarah Douglas; Louise Fletcher
- Music by: Dana Kaproff
- Country of origin: United States
- Original language: English

Production
- Executive producer: Edgar J. Scherick
- Producer: Mitch Engel
- Cinematography: Don FauntLeRoy
- Editor: David Lloyd
- Running time: 90 minutes
- Production company: Victor Television Productions

Original release
- Network: CBS
- Release: May 14, 1996

Related
- The Stepford Children; The Stepford Wives (remake)

The Stepford Husbands is a 1996 American science fiction thriller television film inspired by Ira Levin's 1972 novel The Stepford Wives. It was directed by Fred Walton, written by Ken and Jim Wheat, and stars Donna Mills, Michael Ontkean, Cindy Williams, Sarah Douglas and Louise Fletcher. It is the third in a series of sequels inspired by the novel and the 1975 film The Stepford Wives.

== Plot ==
In the prologue, a docile man suddenly kills his wife in a violent method and then commits suicide.

Several months later, graphic artist Jodi and struggling author Mick Davison move to Stepford, Connecticut, in the same house, hoping that life in the seemingly idyllic town will help rejuvenate their troubled marriage. Jodi reunites with old college friend Caroline and meets the brilliant Dr. Borzage as well as the intimidating Miriam Benton, who heads a powerful women's group. Mick notices the docile men in the community, including Caroline's husband (who shows surprising moments of aggression), but befriends sloppy neighbor Gordon; both agree they are unnerved by the community. However, both Jodi and Mick are concerned when Gordon undergoes a radical behavior change after a stay at the Stepford Institute for Human Behavior, afterwards thinking only of his wife Lisa, but ignoring his son and other interests.

Caroline subtly manipulates the Davisons and drugs Mick at a party. When Mick reacts to the drug, Jodi is convinced that her husband has serious problems and commits him to the Stepford Institute for a cure. Mick is given mind-altering behavioral therapy and psychotropic drugs, altering him to behave docilely, but passionless. Jodi is concerned about the drugs Mick takes as part of the therapy; when she learns that the previous couple in her house (of the murder-suicide) was linked to heavy drugs, she replaces Mick's drugs with placebos. The serious side effects of the treatment becomes clear, the men can become violent, and Mick crashes and threatens to kill Jodi. They reconcile when he is convinced that she did not know of the Institute's motives or methods (in essence, Caroline had made the decision for Jodi). They plan to leave immediately.

Caroline has learned of the Davisons' plan to leave town. With the other residents, Caroline captures them in their own house. Mick is returned to the Institute for reconditioning while Jodi is forced to escape to rescue Mick. Benton allows Jodi to find Mick in the Institute but, with Dr. Borzage, plans to kill her. Borzage, however, is alarmed by the out-of-control ethics and kills Benton with a hypodermic needle meant for Jodi. Borzage then allows the Davisons to escape.

In the epilogue, the fate of the town is not revealed, but Jodi and Mick have returned to New York City. Mick has written a book about the experience and a movie will soon be made.

== Production ==
The film first aired on CBS on May 14, 1996. It was filmed in Wilmington, North Carolina.

It is the third sequel in a string of stories based on the original concept of the novel. The first sequel, Revenge of the Stepford Wives (1980), starred Don Johnson, Sharon Gless, and Julie Kavner and suggested a similar drug-induced compliance. The second sequel, The Stepford Children, (1987) starred Barbara Eden and hewed closer to the original. The third sequel basically reverses the roles, with the women being the oppressors. Louise Fletcher's role, in particular, recalls the role of Dale "Diz" Coba, the Men's Association president, in the original.

The executive producer for the film is Edgar J. Scherick, who produced the first film.

== Reception ==
The Hollywood Reporter said "it's hard to care since this is about as shabbily done as you can get with a good-and-scary, tried-and-true idea. Flat and dull, without passion, a sort of Stepford script."

Variety wrote "Husbands offers a decent diversion, and the familiar faces of Mills and Ontkean are nice to see, but script by Ken and Jim Wheat doesn't deliver thrills — just standard telepic stuff — not all that interesting or compelling."
