= Cliff Osmond =

American actor (1937–2012)

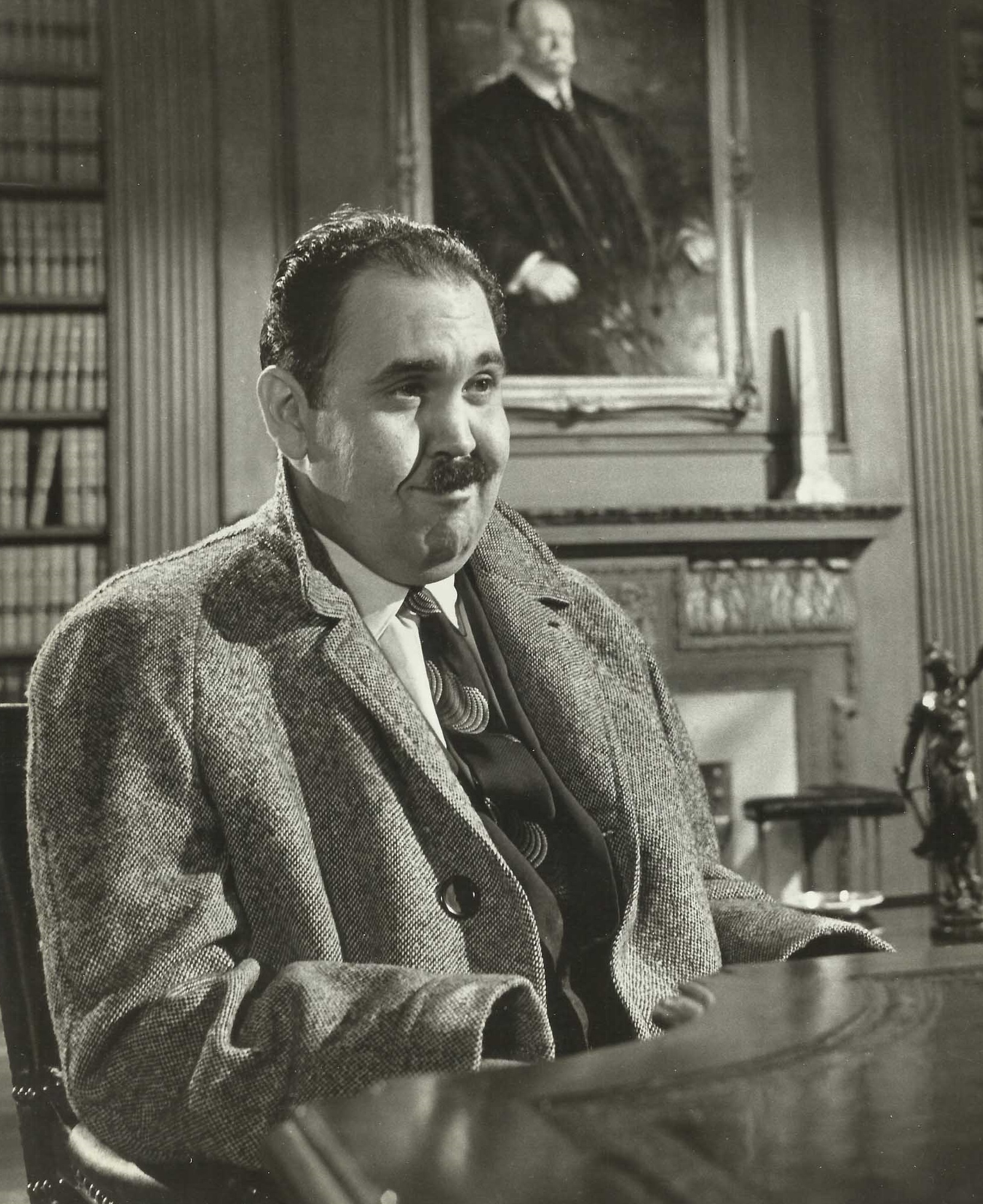
- Osmond in The Fortune Cookie
- Born: February 26, 1937; Jersey City, New Jersey, U.S.
- Died: December 22, 2012 (aged 75); Pacific Palisades, California, U.S.
- Education: Dartmouth College; University of California, Los Angeles
- Occupations: Actor; screenwriter; acting teacher
- Years active: 1962–1996
- Spouse: Gretchen Ebrahim (1962–2012) (his death) (2 children)
- Children: 2

Cliff Osmond (born Clifford Osman Ebrahim; February 26, 1937 – December 22, 2012) was an American character actor, screenwriter, and acting teacher.

== Early life ==
Osmond was born in the Margaret Hague Medical Center in Jersey City, New Jersey, and reared in Union City. He was a graduate of Thomas A. Edison grammar school, Emerson High School, and Dartmouth College, where he earned a Bachelor of Arts in English.

He received his master's degree in Business Administration from the UCLA and advanced to candidacy for the Ph.D. in the field of Theater History there.

== Career ==
He starred in four films directed by Billy Wilder, including Irma la Douce; Kiss Me, Stupid; The Fortune Cookie and The Front Page. Osmond played Pap in the 1981 television adaptation of The Adventures of Huckleberry Finn.

Osmond appeared in over one hundred films and television series. During that period he guest-starred at least half a dozen times on Gunsmoke and in the 1965 episode "Yahoo" of NBC's Laredo. He played a vengeful blind man in the "None So Blind" episode of The Rifleman in 1962, and was cast in "The Gift", (1962) of the original The Twilight Zone. He played a hippie in Ironside (1968) and appeared as well on Here's Lucy (1974), The New Land (1974), as a plumber's apprentice on work release from prison in All in the Family (1975).

As a screenwriter, Osmond was nominated for a Writer's Guild Award for writing an episode of Streets of San Francisco (1973). He also wrote and directed the film The Penitent.

Osmond received a Best Actor award for his UCLA performance of Berthold Brecht's Baal, and the Joseph Jefferson acting award for a Chicago stage appearance in George Bernard Shaw's You Never Can Tell.

In addition to his acting and writing careers, Osmond was an acting teacher and coach in Los Angeles and San Francisco. In the fall of 2004, he was visiting professor in acting and Guest Resident Artist at Georgetown University, teaching two acting courses and directing Henrik Ibsen's A Doll's House.

In 2010, he wrote a book about his career and acting: Acting Is Living: Exploring the Ten Essential Elements in any Successful Performance.

== Death ==
Osmond died of pancreatic cancer on December 22, 2012.

== Filmography ==
- The Rifleman (1962) – None So Blind
- The Rifleman (1962) – Bartender (uncredited)
- Wagon Train (1962) "The John Bernard Story" – Ben Gill; (1963) "Alias Bill Hawks" - Chester Cole
- Irma La Douce (1963) – Police Sergeant
- Have Gun, Will Travel (February 22, 1963) – "Caravan" – Koro
- The Raiders (1963) – Private Jean Duchamps
- Wild and Wonderful (1964) – Hercule – Giselle's Uncle
- Kiss Me, Stupid (1964) – Barney
- Laredo (1965, TV) – Midas Mantee / Running Antelope
- The Fortune Cookie (1966) – Purkey
- Batman (1967, TV) – Andante
- Hogan's Heroes (1967, TV) – Season 3 Episode One "The Crittendon Plan" – Marko
- Gunsmoke (1968, TV) S13Ep16 "The Victim" - Bo Remick
- Three Guns for Texas (1968) – Running Antelope
- The Flying Nun (1968, TV) S2Ep9 "All Alone by the Convent Phone"
- The Devil's 8 (1969) – Bubba
- Gunsmoke (1970) "Celia" – Ben Sommars
- Sweet Sugar (1972) – Burgos
- Invasion of the Bee Girls (1973) – Captain Peters
- Oklahoma Crude (1973) – Massive Man
- The Front Page (1974) – Jacobi
- Sharks' Treasure (1975) – Lobo
- Emergency! (1975, TV) S4Ep19 "It's How You Play the Game" - Gus
- Emergency! (1975, TV) S5Ep3 "Election" - Clyde
- The Bob Newhart Show (1975) – S4Ep5 – Leonard de Paolo
- Joe Panther (1976) – Rance
- Guardian of the Wilderness (1976) – McCollough
- The Mouse and His Child (1977) – C. Serpentina (voice)
- The Great Brain (1978) – Mr. Kokovinis
- The North Avenue Irregulars (1979) – Big Chin
- The Apple Dumpling Gang Rides Again (1979) – Wes Hardin (Bank-robber)
- Beggarman, Thief (1979, TV) – Sagerac
- Hangar 18 (1980) – Sheriff Barlow
- The Adventures of Nellie Bly (1981, TV) – Stanfil
- Lone Star Sports Bar & Grill (1983) – Cal
- In Search of a Golden Sky (1984) – Russ McGuire
- For Which He Stands (1996) – Javier Chavez (final film role)
