= The Undefeated (1969 film) =

1969 film by Andrew V. McLaglen, John Wayne

- 1969 theatrical poster
- Directed by: Andrew V. McLaglen
- Screenplay by: James Lee Barrett
- Story by: Stanley Hough
- Produced by: Robert L. Jacks
- Starring: John Wayne; Rock Hudson; Tony Aguilar; Roman Gabriel; Marian McCargo; Lee Meriwether; Merlin Olsen; Melissa Newman; Bruce Cabot; Ben Johnson
- Cinematography: William H. Clothier
- Edited by: Robert L. Simpson
- Music by: Hugo Montenegro
- Color process: Color by DeLuxe
- Production company: 20th Century-Fox
- Distributed by: 20th Century-Fox
- Release date: November 27, 1969
- Running time: 118 minutes
- Country: United States
- Language: English
- Budget: $7,115,000
- Box office: $8,000,000

The Undefeated is a 1969 American Western and Civil War-era film directed by Andrew V. McLaglen and starring John Wayne and Rock Hudson. The film portrays events surrounding the French Imperial intervention in Mexico during the 1860s period of the neighboring American Civil War. It is also loosely based on Confederate States Army General Joseph Orville Shelby's factual escape to Mexico after the American Civil War (1861–1865), and his attempt to join with Maximilian I of Mexico's Imperial Mexican forces.

== Plot ==
Just outside of Natchez, Mississippi, during the closing days of the American Civil War, Union Army Colonel John Henry Thomas and company organize one final attack on a small unit of Confederate soldiers, only to be informed after bloodily defeating them that the war had ended three days earlier at Appomattox Courthouse in Virginia. Saddened and weary, Thomas leads his men out west towards home with the intention of rounding up and selling wild horses in the Arizona and New Mexico Territories to compensate them for their loyalty, friendship, and war service.

Meanwhile, some Confederate States Army soldiers led by Colonel James Langdon feel the war has left them with no home, and they prepare to emigrate south to Mexico and serve as reinforcements to Emperor Maximilian, leader of the French intervention invasion of Mexico against the republican government of President Benito Juárez. Langdon torches his plantation home before he departs rather than seeing it fall into the hands of Northern carpetbaggers. At the same time, Thomas and the surviving members of his command meet up with Thomas' adopted Indian son, Blue Boy, and other members of his tribe from the Oklahoma and Indian Territories. Together, they round up a herd of 3,000 horses and take them south across the Rio Grande of the North for sale to Maximilian's representatives in Durango, Mexico, after refusing a lower offer from corrupt and greedy U.S. Army purchasing agents.

Halfway there, Blue Boy discovers tracks indicating that Mexican Comanchero bandits are planning an ambush on the group of Confederate travelers. Blue Boy and Thomas go to warn the emigrating Confederates and Thomas and Langdon meet. Despite their differences, the Americans - Northerners, Southerners, and Cherokee Indians - repel the group of Mexican bandidos attacking the Confederate camp, with Thomas' former Union Army troopers saving the day. Col. Langdon thanks the Northerners by inviting them to celebrate at a Fourth of July party - "Southern style". However, the former soldiers soon relive the war when a fight breaks out. They then split and go their separate ways. Meanwhile, Langdon's daughter Charlotte and Blue Boy have quickly fallen in love.

When Langdon's Southern company finally reaches their destination in Durango, they find that Emperor Maximilian's forces had been chased out days earlier, replaced by ragged Mexican Republican forces of President Juárez, under General Rojas, who imprisons them. Viewing the new foreigners as potential enemies, the Juarista general holds the Southerners hostage, offering to release them in exchange for Thomas' horses. After Langdon is sent to Thomas' camp with Rojas' demands, the American cowboys reluctantly agree to pay the ransom to free their brethren. On the way to Durango, Thomas and his men are confronted by French cavalry. A battle erupts with the Americans coming out victorious. Thomas and his men bring the horses to town and pay the ransom for their former enemies.

The company of reunited Americans rides out of Durango to return to the USA. Trying to decide what song to listen to as they ride, the group passes over "Dixie" and "Battle Hymn of the Republic" before settling on "Yankee Doodle". Charlotte and Blue Boy are seen as a couple, while both Thomas and Langdon laugh at how the Confederate colonel's daughter has cut Blue Boy's hair.

== Cast ==
- John Wayne as Colonel John Henry Thomas
- Rock Hudson as Colonel James Langdon
- Tony Aguilar as General Rojas
- Roman Gabriel as Blue Boy, adopted son of John Henry
- Ben Johnson as Short Grub
- Marian McCargo as Ann Langdon
- Lee Meriwether as Margaret Langdon
- Merlin Olsen as Little George
- Melissa Newman as Charlotte Langdon
- Bruce Cabot as Sgt. Jeff Newby
- Michael Vincent as Lt. Bubba Wilkes
- Edward Faulkner as Captain Anderson
- Harry Carey Jr. as Webster
- Paul Fix as General Joe Masters
- Royal Dano as Major Sanders
- Richard Mulligan as Dan Morse
- Carlos Rivas as Diaz
- John Agar as Christian
- Guy Raymond as Giles
- Gregg Palmer as Parker
- Don Collier as Goodyear
- Big John Hamilton as Mudlow
- Dub Taylor as McCartney
- Henry Beckman as Thad Benedict
- Víctor Junco as Major Tapia
- Robert Donner as Private Judd Mailer
- Pedro Armendariz Jr. as Escalante
- James Dobson as Confederate soldier Jamison
- James McEachin as Jimmy Collins
- Juan García as Colonel Gomez

== Production ==
DVD Cover

The original script was by Stanley Hough and Casey Robinson, neither of whom is credited in the final film. Producer Robert Jacks bought the script and proposed the project in December 1967, announcing James Lee Barrett would do the final script rewriting.

In May 1968, Jacks announced the film would be made through 20th Century-Fox Film Corporation (motion pictures studios) . Andrew McLaglen signed to direct as the first of a two-picture deal with 20th Century-Fox. In August 1968, John Wayne agreed to star. The following month, Rock Hudson signed to co-star. The stunt coordinator was Hal Needham, later a film director.

According to Hudson's partner Marc Christian, Wayne started out picking on Hudson during filming, but the two men became friends. In Mark Griffin's biography of Hudson, All That Heaven Allows, Wayne is shown to have initially started to "direct" Hudson, constantly suggesting what he should do on camera. When Hudson began to do the same to Wayne, Wayne pointed his finger at Hudson and said, "I like you." The suggestions stopped, and the two men became frequent partners in chess and bridge.

Filming took place in Sierra de Órganos National Park, near the town of Sombrerete, Zacatecas, Mexico.

== Reception ==
=== Box office ===
The film earned $4.5 million in rentals in North America.

According to 20th Century-Fox studio records, the film required $12,425,000 in rentals to break even, but by December 11, 1970, the film had made only $8,775,000, which resulted in a loss at first for the movie studio (in the short run / initial period of the one cited year (November 1969-December 1970) after its theatrical release on November 27, 1969. In the 55 years since, it has been released on new formats, including Beta / VHS video cassette tapes, laserdiscs, broadcast / cable television rights, compact discs, and online / internet streaming etc.

=== Critical reviews ===
In the Chicago Sun-Times, film critic Roger Ebert (1942–2013), gave the film only 2 out of 4 stars. Ebert wrote in December 1969:

Unfortunately, McLaglen is never able to draw his threads together. As in his The Way West (1967), he takes a panoramic theme and then gets so close to it that we lose sight of the whole...[Old] pro Wayne saves a scene or two with his presence and delivery. He shelves his broken-down Rooster Cogburn image from True Grit (1969) and rides high in the saddle again.

== Novelization ==
A novelization manuscript was written by frequent author James Myers ("Jim") Thompson (1906–1977), and released in paperback form in 1969 by the publisher Popular Library.

== See also ==
- List of American films of 1969
- John Wayne filmography
- O'Flaherty, Daniel C. General Jo Shelby: Undefeated Rebel, University of North Carolina Press, 1954; ISBN 0-8078-4878-6; republished, 2000.
- The Shadow Riders
