= The Stepford Wives =

1972 novel by Ira Levin

- First edition cover
- Author: Ira Levin
- Genre: Thriller, Satire, science fiction
- Publisher: Random House
- Publication date: October 13, 1972
- Publication place: United States
- Media type: Print (hardback and paperback)
- Pages: 145 (first edition, hardback)
- ISBN: 0-394-48199-2 (first edition, hardback)
- OCLC: 303634
- Dewey Decimal: 813.5.4
- LC Class: PS3523.E7993

The Stepford Wives is a 1972 satirical "feminist horror" novel by Ira Levin. The story concerns Joanna Eberhart, a talented photographer, wife, and young mother who suspects that something in the town of Stepford is changing the wives from free-thinking, intelligent women into compliant wives dedicated solely to homemaking. As her friends slowly transform, Joanna realizes the horrific truth.

The book has had two feature film adaptations, both using the same title as the novel: the 1975 version and the 2004 remake. Edgar J. Scherick produced the 1975 version as well as all three of the television sequels. Scherick was credited posthumously as producer of the 2004 remake.

== Plot ==
The premise involves the married men of the fictional Fairfield County town of Stepford, Connecticut and their fawning, submissive, impossibly beautiful wives. The protagonist is Joanna Eberhart, a talented photographer newly arrived from New York City with her husband and children, eager to start a new life.

As time goes on, she becomes increasingly disturbed by the submissive wives of Stepford who seem to lack free will, especially when she sees her once independent-minded friends (Bobbie, Charmaine), fellow new arrivals to Stepford, turn into mindless, docile housewives, each time beginning after a romantic weekend with their respective husbands. All the women deny anything is wrong. Joanna's own husband, Walter, who seems to be spending more and more time at meetings of the local men's association, mocks her fears.

As the story progresses, Joanna becomes convinced that the wives of Stepford are being poisoned or brainwashed into submission by the men's club. She visits the library and researches the pasts of Stepford's wives, discovering that some of the women were once feminist activists and successful professionals. The leader of the men's club is a former Disney engineer and others are artists and scientists, capable of creating lifelike robots. Her friend Bobbie helps her investigate, going so far as to write to the state department of health to inquire about possible toxins in Stepford. However, eventually, Bobbie is also transformed into a docile housewife after a "romantic getaway" with her husband.

At the end of the novel, Joanna decides to flee Stepford, but when she gets home, she finds that her children have been taken. She asks her husband to let her leave but he takes her car keys. She manages to escape from the house on foot and several of the men's club members track her down. They corner her in the woods, and she accuses them of creating robots out of the town's women. The men deny the accusation and ask Joanna if she would believe them if she saw one of the other women bleed. Joanna agrees and they take her to Bobbie's house. Bobbie's husband and son are upstairs, with loud rock music playing. Bobbie brandishes an unusually large knife at Joanna, who fears that if Bobbie is a robot, the loud music upstairs may be intended to hide her screams as she is stabbed to death. Bobbie beckons Joanna closer, and as she is desperate to believe her friend isn't a robot, she complies.

In the story's epilogue, Joanna has become another Stepford wife gliding through the local supermarket, having given up her career as a photographer because, as she puts it, "housework's enough for me". Ruthanne Hendry (a new resident and the first black woman in Stepford) appears poised to become the next victim.

== Publication ==
The Stepford Wives was released on October 13, 1972, published by Random House in the United States. In a letter to The New York Times dated March 27, 2007, Levin said that he based the town of Stepford on Wilton, Connecticut, where he lived in the 1960s. Wilton is a "step" from Stamford, a major city lying 15 miles (24 km) away. Inspired by domestic robots in the 1970 book Future Shock and the presidential animatronics at Disneyland, Levin originally intended the novel to be written as a comedic play.

== Themes ==
=== The reaction of men to feminism ===
Michelle Arrow says: "not only a satire of male fears of women's liberation, but a savage view of heterosexual marriage. In this telling, a man would rather kill his wife and replace her with a robot than commit to equality and recognise her as a whole person."

=== The role of women in the home ===
There are many feminist themes in The Stepford Wives. The novel tackles the role of women in the nuclear family and the control they have over their bodies by allowing the readers to observe what happens in Stepford when Joanna moves in. Before the women in Stepford turned into lifeless, docile robots, they were avid activists and successful career women who had lives outside of being a wife. However, the men in Stepford were opposed to this, turning their wives into robots and reducing their only purposes in life down to serving their husbands.

=== Consent ===
The theme of consent is tackled in The Stepford Wives franchise. The reason why the men in Stepford make their wives into submissive robots is that they are afraid of losing control over their wives. The similarity between sex robots and the women in Stepford is that they are both lifeless and docile, hence the men do not need consent in order to fulfill their sexual desire.

== Adaptations ==
In 1975, the book was adapted into a science fiction thriller directed by Bryan Forbes with a screenplay by William Goldman and starring Katharine Ross, Paula Prentiss, Peter Masterson and Tina Louise. While the script emphasis is on sexual conflict and the sterility of suburban living, and thus the science fiction elements are only lightly explored, the movie still makes it much clearer than the book that the women are being replaced by some form of robot. Goldman's treatment of the book differed from that of Forbes, with the robots closer to an idealized Playboy Bunny; Goldman said that the look was scrapped when Forbes's actress wife Nanette Newman was cast as one of the town residents.

A 1980 television sequel was titled Revenge of the Stepford Wives. In this film, instead of being androids, the wives have undergone a brainwashing procedure and then take pills that keep them hypnotized. In the end, the wives break free of their conditioning and a mob of them kills the mastermind behind the conspiracy.

In a 1987 television sequel/remake titled The Stepford Children, both the wives and the children of the male residents were replaced by drones. It ended with the members of the conspiracy being killed.

A 1996 version called The Stepford Husbands was made as a third television movie with the sexual roles reversed and the men in the town being brainwashed by a female clinic director into being perfect husbands.

Another film titled The Stepford Wives was released in 2004. It was directed by Frank Oz and featured Nicole Kidman, Bette Midler, Matthew Broderick, Christopher Walken, Roger Bart, Faith Hill, Glenn Close and Jon Lovitz. It was intended to be more comedic than the previous versions. The new script by screenwriter Paul Rudnick has the women being transformed into carefully controlled cyborgs rather than being murdered and replaced with robots. The script culminates in a twist ending in which it is a powerful woman (played by Glenn Close) who is the evil mastermind of the injustice perpetrated on other women, and features a "Stepfordized" male partner of a gay town resident. Unlike the original novel and most of the adaptations, the perpetrators of the conspiracy neither die nor get away with their crimes; the victims are freed from their control programming and subject their husbands to a taste of their own medicine as restitution.

While not confirmed to be directly based on it, the story of the 2022 film Don't Worry Darling shares motifs regarding technology and feminine compliance that, in reviews, have drawn comparisons to The Stepford Wives. The story was an influence on Jordan Peele's 2017 horror film Get Out.

== In language ==
The term "Stepford wife" entered common use in the English language after the publication of Levin's book. It is generally used as a derogatory term for a submissive and docile wife who seems to conform to the stereotype of a subservient role in relationship to her husband.

== See also ==
- Culture of Domesticity
- Tradwife
