= One Dark Night =

1983 film

- Original theatrical poster
- Directed by: Tom McLoughlin
- Written by: Michael Hawes; Tom McLoughlin
- Produced by: Michael Schroeder
- Starring: Meg Tilly; Melissa Newman; Donald Hotton; Adam West
- Cinematography: Hal Trussell
- Edited by: Michael Spence; Charles Tetoni
- Music by: Bob Summers
- Distributed by: Comworld Pictures
- Release date: July 9, 1982
- Running time: 94 minutes
- Country: United States
- Language: English
- Budget: $800,000
- Box office: $3.7 million

One Dark Night (also known as Entity Force) is a 1982 (Note: Though it received major distribution in January 1983 and is sometimes listed as a 1983 production, the film was first released on July 9, 1982 in multiple U.S. cities, including Albuquerque, El Paso, Fresno, and St. Louis.) American supernatural horror film directed by Tom McLoughlin, and starring Meg Tilly, E. G. Daily, and Adam West. It follows three teenagers sent to a mausoleum for the night as part of a high school initiation rite. A telekinetic occultist returns from the dead and haunts them, forcing the three to survive the night inside the crypt.

The film was conceived and filmed under the title Rest in Peace before Poltergeist. It was given a limited platform release in the United States on July 9, 1982, before receiving wide distribution by Comworld Pictures in January 1983.

== Plot ==
The police find six girls murdered in the apartment of famed Russian occultist Karl Raymarseivich Raymar, and they can't explain it. When coroners lift Raymar's body onto a stretcher, bolts of electricity shoot out from his fingers. His estranged daughter, Olivia McKenna, and her husband Allan are unaware of this until they meet Samuel Dockstader, a feature writer for The World of the Occult. As a friend of Raymar, Dockstader explains that Raymar was a psychic vampire who gained great telekinetic powers by kidnapping young girls, terrorizing them, and feeding off the bioenergy they produced. Allan does not believe him, but Dockstader shows Olivia a set of photographs to demonstrate how bioenergy works and gives her an audiotape that outlines his findings, which convinces Olivia to believe him.

Meanwhile, high school student Julie Wells wants to be part of a club entitled The Sisters, which consists of three snobby high school girls named Carol, Leslie, and Kitty. Unfortunately, Carol is the ex-girlfriend of Julie's new boyfriend, Steve, and is jealous. She intends to get back at Steve and Julie by making Julie spend a night alone in a mausoleum, unaware that Raymar's body was just entombed there. That evening, Julie is dropped off by only Carol and Kitty, as Leslie had refused to accompany them on the plan. Julie explores the mausoleum and sets up her sleeping bag, unaware of the cracks appearing around Raymar's vault.

Hoping to scare Julie, Carol and Kitty dress up in costumes and sneak back into the mausoleum. While they succeed in frightening Julie, who locks herself in the chapel, they are unaware that Raymar is slowly reawakening by using his powers to make the walls shake, windows explode, and doors slam shut. Before Carol and Kitty decide to leave, Raymar's powers open up the vaults containing coffins inside. Many rotting cadavers telekinetically float and surround the girls before they pile on top of them to suffocate them.

Meanwhile, Steve has gone to Julie's house to find her missing. He catches up with Leslie, who reluctantly tells Steve about Julie's initiation, and Steve angrily heads over to the mausoleum. At the same time, Olivia dashes over after learning about her father's powers and the possibility that she might also possess them. Back at the mausoleum, Raymar finally breaks out of his coffin and controls the rotting corpses and the doors with his psychic powers. Just when Steve breaks in and finds an hysterical Julie, they become surrounded by the corpses that advance toward them. Steve tries to fight the bodies, but they knock him out. Raymar pulls a dazed Julie closer to him before Olivia arrives to save her. Ultimately, Olivia takes her compact and reflects the bolts from Raymar's eyes at him, causing Raymar and the carcasses to disintegrate, rescuing Julie and Steve.

The three, including a now traumatized Julie, begin slowly walking out of the mausoleum. The film ends with Kitty's toothbrush (which she always carries around with her, usually holding it in her mouth) seen near the mound of corpses inside the empty mausoleum before a corpse falls in front and emits a scream.

== Cast ==
- Meg Tilly as Julie Wells
- Melissa Newman as Olivia McKenna
- Robin Evans as Carol Mason
- Leslie Speights as Kitty
- Donald Hotton as Dockstader
- E. G. Daily as Leslie Winslow
- David Mason Daniels as Steve
- Adam West as Allan McKenna
- Rhio H. Blair as Coroner

== Production ==
=== Development ===
Before becoming a director, Tom McLoughlin was a struggling scriptwriter and also starred in several minor roles in film including playing the monster in John Frankenheimer's 1979 horror film Prophecy. He worked with director Woody Allen in his 1973 film Sleeper. Not having much success with selling several comedy screenplays, McLoughlin and his friend Michael Hawes decided to make a gothic horror film similar to the works of Edgar Allan Poe. For inspiration McLoughlin drew upon his experience of exploring the catacombs in Paris, France when he was 19 years old, as McLoughlin recalled years later, "It was the first time that I ever felt psychological or supernatural fear. There was nothing there; there was nobody coming after me; but there was just something about knowing where I was and what I was surrounded by, that gave me a chill that was unforgettable".

The script was initially developed under the title Night in the Crypt. McLoughlin and Hawes also came up with the idea of a group of people being trapped inside a mausoleum with a "psychic vampire" that fed on the life energy of the other members of the group. After a period of four years failing to sell the script to various studios McLoughlin and Hawes found a group of Mormon investors who were willing to finance the film for one million dollars on the condition that they started filming in three weeks.

=== Casting ===
When searching for a lead actress to play the role of the film's heroine director McLoughlin had a specific vision for the film's heroine, "I wanted the classic beautiful blond geek girl who had a sense of innocence about her, and she was the one who was going to be tormented," he later recalled. After looking at actresses like Sharon Stone and Dominique Dunne, then 19-year-old actress Meg Tilly was cast for the role, and Batman actor Adam West was later cast for the role of the lead male character.

=== Filming ===
Filming took place in Los Angeles over a period of 28 days both on sets and on location with a budget of $800,000. The film's impressive special effects for the corpses used in the film were designed by Tom Burman along with several other artists. On filming in the actual mausoleum McLoughlin recalled, "In all those mausoleum scenes, Meg really got freaked out. She did not want to be there, and she allowed all that fear to work, even though we went into a set for some special effects sequences. She still carried the same vibe with her that she had in the mausoleum. She raised the bar in the film."

=== Post-production ===
During the film's post-production the film was taken out of McLoughlin's hands and re-cut with the original ending removed. As McLoughlin recalled, "There was a version of the movie that wasn't shown in theaters, where there was this passing of Ramar's energies to the Meg Tilly character... In our version, she turns and we actually used Nastassia Kinski's eyes from Cat People. There was this look that made them look dead and animal-like to give the audience this chill that it's not over. She got whatever Ramar had in her now".

== Release ==
One Dark Night was given a regional limited theatrical release in several U.S. cities on July 9, 1982. It later received a special screening in Philadelphia on December 31, 1982. The film opened in Los Angeles the following week, on January 7, 1983.

=== Home media ===
Shriek Show released One Dark Night in January 2006. It was released again in November 2007 in a three-pack with Girls Nite Out and Blood Sisters. The film was released on Blu-Ray from Code Red on August 15, 2017.

=== Critical response ===
Steve Barton of Dread Central rated it 4/5 stars and called it a guilty pleasure that is horrible in an endearing way. TV Guide awarded the film 2/4 stars, commending McLouglin's direction, acting, and special make-up effects. Annie Riordan of Brutal as Hell called it a dull and formulaic horror film, recommended only to hardcore fans of the cast. Mike Long of DVD Talk rated it 2.5/5 stars and wrote that the film would have made a better 30-minute short. Long highlighted the final sequence as the film's best, which is gory for a PG-rated film. Bryan Pope of DVD Verdict called it "good, scary fun" and also highlighted the final gory sequence. Writing in The Zombie Movie Encyclopedia, academic Peter Dendle called it a quirky horror film whose zombies parody the stereotypical actions of early 1980s zombies.

== Sources ==
- Dendle, Peter (2001). The Zombie Movie Encyclopedia. Jefferson, North Carolina: McFarland. pp. 130–131. ISBN 978-0-7864-9288-6.
- Kay, Glenn (2012). Zombie Movies: The Ultimate Guide. Chicago, Illinois: Chicago Review Press. ISBN 978-1-61374-425-3.
- Muir, John Kenneth (2012). Horror Films of the 1980s. Jefferson, North Carolina: McFarland. ISBN 978-0-7864-5501-0.
