= In Search of a Golden Sky =

- Directed by: Jefferson Richard
- Written by: George "Buck Flower; John F. Goff
- Produced by: George "Buck" Flower; Jefferson Richard
- Starring: Charles Napier; George Buck Flower; Cliff Osmond; Anne Szesny; Shane Wallace; Junior Richard; Josanne Wayman; Beverly Rowland; Stafford Morgan; Eric Hart; Craig Clyde; Jesse Bennett; Bob Lee; Lynne Van Dam; David A.J. Hampshire; John R. Hanskat; Don Gomes
- Cinematography: Henning Schellerup
- Edited by: Lee Stepansky
- Music by: Bob Summers
- Production companies: International Pictures (IPI); Generic Pictures
- Distributed by: Comworld Pictures
- Release dates: 1984 (Utah); 1986 (Los Angeles, California)
- Running time: 94 minutes
- Country: United States
- Language: English

In Search of a Golden Sky is a 1984 adventure-drama film released by Comworld Pictures. In the film, three orphan children find solace in their uncle's wilderness home after their mother has died.

== Plot ==
After their mother dies and their father, David Morrison (Stafford Morgan), disappears, young Luanne (Anne Szesny) and her brothers, Randy (Shane Wallace) and Marcus (Junior Richard), have no one to take care of them besides their reclusive Uncle Zep (George "Buck" Flower). Initially reluctant to move to the countryside, the children soon win over the old man—but then the county's welfare department, convinced Zep is not a suitable guardian, tries to place the children in foster care.

== Production ==
Shot on location in the state of Utah, Golden Sky was completed in 1982, but not released until two years later. It received a video release in early 1987 on CBS/Fox's Playhouse label. The bears and foxes were trained by employees of Heber City, Utah's Wasatch Rocky Mountain Wildlife and Thousand Oaks, California's Animal Actors of Hollywood.

== Cast ==
- Charles Napier as T. J. Rivers
- George Buck Flower as Zep Morrison
- Cliff Osmond as Russ McGuire
- Anne Szesny as Luanne Morrison
- Shane Wallace as Randy Morrison
- Junior Richard as Marcus Morrison
- Josanne Wayman as Irene Rivers
- Beverly Rowland as Aunt Marcy (credited as Beverly Booth Rowland)
- Stafford Morgan as David Morrison
- Eric Hart as Arthur Sutton
- Craig Clyde as Eddie Briggs
- Jesse Bennett as Carl Hodges
- Bob Lee as Jerry Doyle
- Lynne Van Dam as Mrs. Bonner
- David A.J. Hampshire as Bob Hoskins
- John R. Hanskat as Chet Ford
- Don Gomes as Tom Duffy

== Reception ==
Utah's Deseret News gave the film one and a half stars out of four. The "dreadful family picture", it commented, "[has] one of the most ridiculously contrived, unintentionally humorous endings ever".
