= Lisa Lynn Masters =

American actress

- Born: March 20, 1964; Omaha, Nebraska, U.S.
- Died: November 15, 2016 (aged 52); Lima, Peru
- Occupations: Actress, model
- Years active: 1996–2016
- Known for: Unbreakable Kimmy Schmidt, The Stepford Wives, Law and Order, Blumenthal
- Spouse: William Ben Brooks (2004–2016; her death)

Lisa Lynn Masters (March 20, 1964 – November 15, 2016) was an American actress, writer and model.

== Early life and education ==
Masters was born in Omaha, Nebraska, and raised in Asheville, North Carolina. She graduated from Appalachian State University in broadcasting with a minor in modern dance. She later attended Columbia University Graduate School of Journalism.

== Career ==
After college, Masters worked as a model and news reporter and landed an uncredited role as a news reporter in the feature film The Siege. She appeared in TV commercials and, later, the feature films The Stepford Wives and It's Complicated.

Masters continued modeling and acted in several television series, including an episode each in Law & Order: Criminal Intent and Law & Order: Special Victims Unit, Ugly Betty, Iron Fist, Gossip Girl, Nashville and Unbreakable Kimmy Schmidt. She died at age 52 while on a modeling assignment in Peru. Her death was ruled a suicide.

== Filmography ==
Film roles
Year	Title	Role	Notes
1996	Close Up	Reporter	
1998	Burn	Reporter	
1998	The Siege	Reporter #2	
2002	One Day	Mom	Short film
2004	The Stepford Wives	Carol Wainwright	
2008	The Clique	Mrs. Marvil	
2009	It's Complicated	Woman in Elevator	
2013	Blumenthal	Sadie	
2015	The Girl in the Book	Alana	
2015	Fishbowl	Dylan	
Television roles
Year	Title	Role	Notes
2004	Hope & Faith	Guest #2	Episode: "Faith's Maid"
2005	Law & Order: Criminal Intent	Wendy	Episode:"Gone"
2008	Ugly Betty	Crying Museum Curator	Episode: "Filing for the Enemy"
2010	Beach Lane	Wife	Television film
2011	Gossip Girl	Bryn Harold	Episode: "While You Weren't Sleeping"
2012	Law & Order: Special Victims Unit	Tina Heller	Episode: "Official Story"
2012	Royal Pains	Mrs. Burns	Episode: "About Face"
2015	Unbreakable Kimmy Schmidt	Dr. Goodman	Episode: "Kimmy Goes to a Party!"
2015	Nashville	Dr. Laurel Kennedy	Episode: "Before You Go Make Sure You Know"
2017	Iron Fist	Doctor	Episode: "Under Leaf Pluck Lotus"
