= Comworld Pictures =

American movie distributor

- Industry: Film distribution
- Founded: 1980
- Defunct: 1986
- Headquarters: Orem, Utah, United States

Comworld Pictures was a movie distributor that existed from 1980 to 1986. Comworld Pictures was established as a subsidiary of Comworld Group, being set up in Midway, Utah with Charles Sellier as its president with early involvement with Burt Reynolds.

== Movies released by that company ==
- Seasons in the Sun (1986)
- New Girl (1985)
- In Search of a Golden Sky (1984)
- Billions for Boris (1984)
- Snowballing (1984)
- BMX Bandits (1983)
- On the Run (1983)
- Getting It On (1983)
- The Final Terror (1983)
- Hit and Run (1983)
- One Dark Night (1983)
- Somewhere, Tomorrow (1983)
- Spring Fever (1982)
- Night Warning (1982)
- Ator l'invincibile (1982)
- The Avenging (1982)
- Hotwire (1980)
