= Butcher, Baker, Nightmare Maker =

1982 American horror film by William Asher

- Theatrical release poster
- Directed by: William Asher; Michael Miller (uncredited)
- Written by: Stephen Breimer; Boon Collins; Alan Jay Glueckman
- Story by: Alan Jay Glueckman
- Based on: Oedipus the King by Sophocles
- Produced by: Stephen Breimer
- Starring: Jimmy McNichol; Susan Tyrrell; Bo Svenson; Marcia Lewis; Bill Paxton
- Cinematography: Robbie Greenberg; Jan de Bont (uncredited)
- Edited by: Ted Nicolaou
- Music by: Bruce Langhorne
- Production company: Royal American Pictures
- Distributed by: Comworld Pictures
- Release date: November 20, 1981 (Salem, Oregon)
- Running time: 96 minutes
- Country: United States
- Language: English

Butcher, Baker, Nightmare Maker (later re-released as Night Warning) is a 1981 American exploitation horror film directed by William Asher, and starring Susan Tyrrell, Jimmy McNichol, Julia Duffy, and Bo Svenson. Framed as a contemporary Oedipus tale, the plot focuses on a teenager who, raised by his neurotic aunt, finds himself at the center of a murder investigation after she stabs a man to death in their house. The boy's sexually repressed aunt secretly harbors incestuous feelings for him, while a detective investigating the crime irrationally believes the murder to be a result of a homosexual love triangle.

Financed by the independent Royal American Pictures, the film was shot in Los Angeles in 1981. Michael Miller was originally hired to direct, and completed the filming of the opening sequence with cinematographer Jan de Bont before being fired and replaced by Asher, who shot the remainder of the film with Robbie Greenberg.

Given a regional release in Oregon in November 1981 through Comworld Pictures, the film expanded to other U.S. cities in early 1982, and was nominated for a Saturn Award for the Best Horror Movie of 1982 by the Academy of Science Fiction, Fantasy and Horror Films. It was reissued theatrically in 1983 under the title Night Warning, under which it was subsequently released on home video. The film has attracted critical discussion for its early positive portrayal of a gay male character.

== Plot ==
High school senior Billy Lynch lives with his protective aunt Cheryl, who has raised him since infancy after his parents died in a car accident. Billy, a gifted basketball player, is offered a chance at a scholarship to attend the University of Denver. Still, Cheryl dismisses the idea, assuming that Billy will stay with her to "contribute." At school, Billy is bullied by one of his teammates, Eddie, who is jealous of Billy's close camaraderie with their coach, Tom Landers.

On Billy's 17th birthday, Cheryl changes her mind about the scholarship and asks Billy to stop by the television repair shop to have the shop technician, Phil Brody, come by to look at their set. That night, after Phil works on their television, Cheryl makes sexual advances toward him; when he refuses, Cheryl stabs him to death with a kitchen knife, which Billy witnesses through the window. Cheryl then claims that Phil tried to rape her.

A police detective (and former Marine and Purple Heart recipient), Joe Carlson, is assigned to the case and is skeptical of Cheryl and the alleged rape attempt. After discovering that Phil Brody was gay and that he was in a same-sex relationship with Tom, he assumes that the murder is the result of a love triangle between Phil, Tom, and Billy and that Cheryl is covering for her nephew. Carlson begins questioning Billy, accusing him of being a "fag," and harasses Tom, forcing him to resign from his job at the high school. Carlson also inquires from Julia, the school newspaper photographer, about her and Billy's sexual relationship. Meanwhile, Cheryl feeds Billy drugged milk, which causes him to perform poorly at his scholarship tryout, and cleans out the attic so he can have a space in the house as an apartment. Sergeant Cook, who has been casing Cheryl's home, is suspicious of Cheryl and believes Billy is innocent.

After walking in on Billy and Julia having sex, Cheryl becomes enraged with Billy. In the attic, Billy finds a photo of Chuck, a man Cheryl claims was one of his mother's old boyfriends. Billy has Julia stop by the house to distract Cheryl so he can investigate further; locked in a box upstairs, he finds his birth certificate, which indicates that Cheryl is his mother and Chuck is his father. Meanwhile, downstairs, Cheryl strikes Julia in the head with a meat tenderizer and again drugs Billy, rendering him unconscious.

Julia awakens in a secret room in the basement and discovers Chuck's mummified corpse and his severed head in a jar of formaldehyde next to a makeshift shrine. Cheryl's neighbor, Margie, having grown suspicious, arrives to investigate the goings-on on the property and is followed into the woods behind the house by Cheryl, who kills her with a machete. Cook then enters the house in search of Julia, who has been reported missing by her mother, and is also murdered by Cheryl after discovering Julia in the basement. Cheryl chases Julia out of the house, and they both fall into a pond near the woods, where Cheryl again knocks Julia unconscious.

Billy awakens in the attic, which Cheryl has adorned with his childhood toys, and stumbles downstairs to call the police. While he is attempting to dial 911, Cheryl attacks him with a knife, and a struggle ensues, ending with Billy impaling her with a fireplace poker. Billy calls Tom, asking for help. Carlson then arrives at the house, finds Tom treating Billy's stab wounds, and sees Cheryl's corpse on the floor. Furious, Carlson blames Billy and Tom for the crimes and draws his gun on them despite Julia's cries that Cheryl is responsible. Tom and Carlson get into a scuffle, during which Billy grabs the weapon, repeatedly shooting Carlson. Carlson dies while Billy and Julia embrace, both crying.

Billy stands trial for Carlson's death but is unanimously acquitted due to "temporary insanity". Billy and Julia later attend college together.

== Cast ==
- Susan Tyrrell as Cheryl Roberts
- Bo Svenson as Detective Joe Carlson
- Jimmy McNichol as Billy Lynch
- Bill Paxton (as William Paxton) as Eddie
- Marcia Lewis as Margie
- Julia Duffy as Julia
- Steve Eastin as Coach Tom Landers
- Britt Leach as Sgt. Cook
- Caskey Swaim as Phil Brody
- Cooper Neal as Frank
- Gary Baxley as Craig Strang/Bill Lynch Sr.
- Kay Kimler as Anna Lynch
- Randy Norton as Student Tony
- Alex Baker as Police Officer Westcott
- Vickie Oleson as Lady Police Officer
- Clemente Anchondo as Jail Arrestee
- Kelly Kopp as Student
- Steve DeFrance as Lab Man
- Bill Keene as Radio Announcer

== Analysis and themes ==
=== Malignant motherhood ===
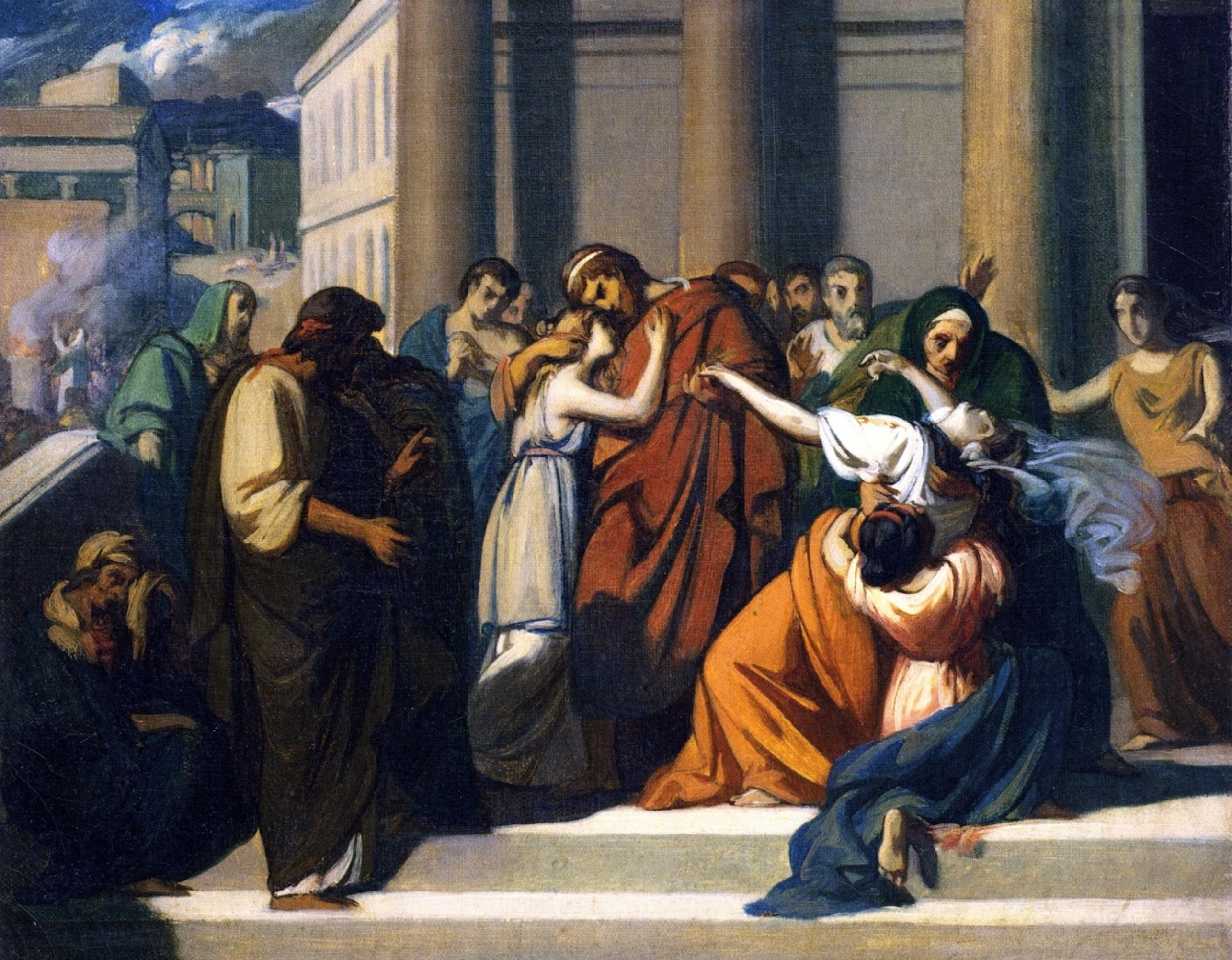
The film borrows themes and structures from Oedipus the King, specifically regarding adoption and mother-son incest

Horror film scholar John Kenneth Muir writes extensively regarding the themes of motherhood in Butcher, Baker, Nightmare Maker in his book Horror Films of the 1980s, specifically the warped relationship that Billy's aunt Cheryl (whom he later discovers to be in fact his mother) has with him. Muir points out several motifs surrounding this theme, such as the milk Cheryl uses to drug him, "a symbol of her twisted motherhood... Billy is rendered impotent by the milk, infantilized by Cheryl's inappropriate and inimical ministrations." Muir also suggests that the film may potentially be engaging with the American stereotype that overbearing mothers produce gay sons, as Billy's sexuality is questioned by those around him throughout the film.

Several other critics and scholars have noted the plotline of Butcher, Baker, Nightmare Maker is modeled after Oedipus the King by Sophocles, borrowing the themes of adoption and incestual yearning from a mother to her son. Muir writes that when Billy eventually murders Cheryl in self-defense, he impales her with a fire poker—a phallic symbol—and that, after the struggle, her dead body collapses around his in what resembles a sexual position.

=== Inversion of the "final girl" ===
Writer Marc Heuck notes that the film

predicted tropes of young adult books and films for decades to come: a teenager living in relative comfort is thrust into dangerous circumstance beyond their preparedness or comprehension, and discovers that neither parental figures nor the law can be trusted. Hell, many of us in our advanced age still have nightmares of this sort and never quite transcend that basic fear. It’s this theme that probably kept those teenage girls in their seats when the subject matter started getting really icky and they would have been tempted to leave for the mall.

Heuck also views the character of Billy as an inversion of the "final girl" trope, in that "not only is he directly injured by the villains and survives against the odds, he is also extremely attractive, feeding into the unhealthy motivations of those who threaten him within and the desires of the audience watching him outside." The counterpoint to Billy is the character of Julia, his girlfriend, whom Heuck notes as taking on the "helpful boyfriend" role often present in slasher films.

=== Portrayal of homosexuality ===
Butcher, Baker, Nightmare Maker has been noted for being an early film to portray a homosexual male character as a positive figure by featuring Tom Landers, Billy's gay basketball coach who is subjected to homophobia, and later comes to Billy and Julia's rescue in the final sequence. Steve Easton, who portrayed the character, recalled that the screenplay did not sensationalize the character's sexuality: "He's a gay man, but he's not a pervert. He just likes men, and he's got a boyfriend, and his boyfriend is murdered." Scholar Jeffery Dennis notes that Tom's partner, who is murdered early in the film by Billy's aunt Cheryl, is "perhaps the only gay person in all of American cinema who is not an urban sophisticate", as well as one of the only characters in the film shown to be an upstanding individual.

Likewise, Dennis interprets an inversion of social norms in which heterosexual desire as "oppressive and sinister... Aunt Cheryl opines that "Homosexuals are very, very sick!" as she murders half a dozen people, grabs and fondles Billy, drugs his milk, and finally tries to stab him." The question of Billy's potential homosexuality is also noted, though Dennis states that his "sexual identity is not answered by his constant protesting-too-much or by his buddy bond with the coach."

== Production ==
=== Screenplay ===
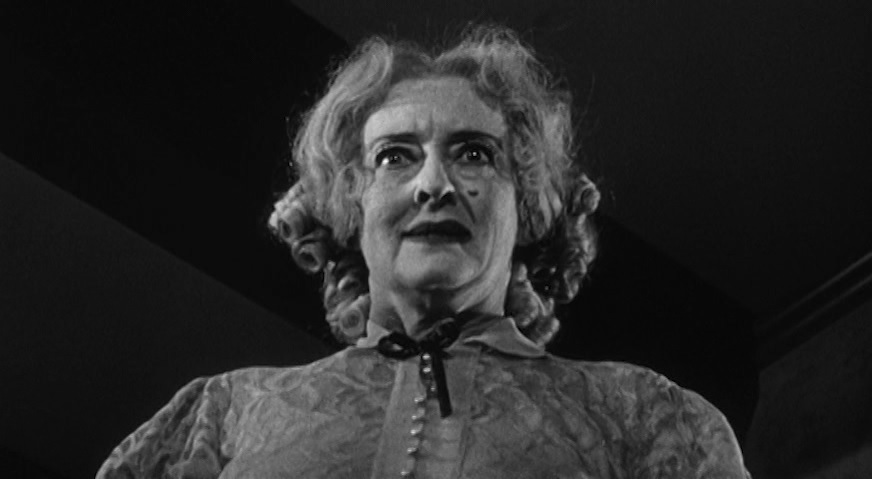
The character of the unhinged Cheryl was partly inspired by female film antagonists such as Baby Jane Hudson in What Ever Happened to Baby Jane? (1962)

Producer and co-writer Stephen Breimer co-wrote the film's screenplay with Boon Collins and Alan Jay Glueckman, aspiring to blend elements of character-driven films led by female villains (such as What Ever Happened to Baby Jane?) with the slasher film. The genesis of the story was based on Breimer's own curiosity about his biological parents, as he himself was adopted. Though the core of the plot was devised by Breimer and Glueckman, Boone, a writer from Vancouver, helped write several sequences, including the opening car crash death of Billy's parents.

=== Casting ===
Jimmy McNichol, cast as the male lead, Billy, was among the first to sign on to the film. McNichol had achieved significant success as a child star, which led to him signing a three-picture contract with executive producer Jerry Weintraub, in which he would receive top billing. Breimer had initially wanted Bill Paxton for the leading role, but instead gave him a minor supporting part as one of Billy's bullying classmates. After McNichol was cast, Bo Svenson, who was also represented by McNichol's talent agency, was cast in the role of Joe Carlson, the homophobic detective. In seeking an actress to portray Cheryl, the unhinged aunt of Billy, producer Stephen Breimer hand-selected Susan Tyrrell based on her performance in Fat City (1972). Glueckman was enthusiastic about Tyrrell's involvement in the film, having met her on the set of Forbidden Zone (1980). Director William Asher instructed Tyrrell to "pull out all the stops," giving her character an exaggerated performance that would help lend the film a "larger-than-life" quality. Julia Duffy was cast as Billy's girlfriend, Julia, beating out several other actresses who auditioned for the part, including Daryl Hannah and Ally Sheedy.

=== Filming ===
Principal photography took place in Los Angeles, California. Though William Asher is solely credited as director, the film's opening sequence was shot by Michael Miller, who had previously directed Jackson County Jail (1976) for Roger Corman. Jan de Bont served as Miller's cinematographer for the scene. Finding Miller's production pacing too slow, the film's investors fired Miller and replaced him with Asher. Asher had previously had a long career directing in television, including numerous episodes of I Love Lucy and Bewitched. The home in the film was located on a historic property in Elysian Park that housed a larger estate, as well as several other cottages.

== Release ==
=== Distribution ===
The film was first given a small regional release through Comworld Pictures under the title Butcher, Baker, Nightmare Maker in several cities in Oregon, including Salem and Corvallis, on November 20, 1981. (Note: A Los Angeles Times profile on star Jimmy McNichol notes that the film is scheduled for a January 1982 release, but newspaper listings indicate it was screening at several cinemas and drive-ins in Oregon in November and December of 1981.) A novel tie-in written by Joseph Burgo was issued by Pocket Books on December 1, 1981. The film's theatrical release expanded in March 1982, screening in St. Louis, Missouri, as well as Vancouver, British Columbia.

The film was re-released in January 1983 under the title Night Warning, first screening in the California cities of San Francisco and Santa Cruz, as well as Indianapolis, Indiana.

=== Critical response ===
Upon the film's opening in Corvallis, Oregon, local Corvallis Gazette-Times critic Lloyd Woods praised the performances of Tyrrell and Svenson as well as the direction of William Asher, who he felt "does a credible job in developing the derangement." Leonard Maltin awarded the film his usual two-and-a-half out of four stars, his most frequently used rating, writing: "Explosive, tour-de-force acting by Tyrrell distinguishes this formula horror film.

Following its January 1983 re-release under the title Night Warning, critic J. A. Conner of the Santa Cruz Sentinel characterized the film as a "Tennessee Williams version of Psycho" and deemed it an early contender for the worst films of 1983, summarizing: "Night Warning is just another drive-in grindhouse sleazoid mess that somehow wandered into town by the back door."

AllMovie awarded it two-and-a-half out of five stars and labeled it "an especially unique entry into the slasher film cycle in the 1980s" based on its influences, the 1960s Gothic horror films. Kevin Thomas of the Los Angeles Times wrote, "Unfolding deftly under Asher's direction, Night Warning combines darkly outrageous humor with persuasive psychological validity." Variety called it "a fine psychological horror film" in which Tyrrell "gives a tour-de-force performance." In Horror Movies of the 1980s, John Kenneth Muir rated it 3.5/4 stars. Muir called it "a true gem of the decade" and "the 1980s' most twisted, bizarre cinematic vision of motherhood."

In a 2019 article published in Film Comment, Justin Stewart praised Asher for directing "with a meat-and-potatoes efficiency and visual sense, letting the casting, risk-taking performances, and the twisted, quirky screenplay... carry the day," and also praised Tyrrell's performance.

== Home media ==
The film screened on The Movie Channel in the fall of 1983, and was released on VHS through HBO Home Video under the Night Warning title in 1985. In the United Kingdom, the film was deemed a "video nasty" by the British Board of Film Classification and refused a video certificate in 1987 under the title The Evil Protege.

Independent label Code Red issued the film on DVD in 2014, and reissued it on Blu-ray on July 18, 2017, which featured a 2K scan of the original film elements.

== Bibliography ==
- Breimer, Stephen; Glueckman, Alan Jay; Thompson, Nathaniel (moderator) (2008). Butcher Baker Nightmare Maker (DVD audio commentary). Code Red.
- Dennis, Jeffery P. (2006). Queering Teen Culture: All-American Boys and Same-sex Desire in Film and Television. New York: Psychology Press. ISBN 978-1-560-23349-7.
- Kabatchnik, Amnon (2014). Blood on the Stage, 480 B.C. to 1600 A.D.: Milestone Plays of Murder, Mystery, and Mayhem. New York: Rowman & Littlefield. ISBN 978-1-442-23547-2.
- Maltin, Leonard (2013). Leonard Maltin's 2014 Movie Guide: The Modern Era. New York: Plume. ISBN 978-0-142-18055-6.
- Muir, John Kenneth (2012). Horror Films of the 1980s. Jefferson, North Carolina: McFarland. ISBN 978-0-786-45501-0.
