= Kiss Me, Stupid =

1964 film by Billy Wilder

- Theatrical release poster
- Directed by: Billy Wilder
- Screenplay by: Billy Wilder; I. A. L. Diamond
- Based on: L'ora della fantasia by Anna Bonacci
- Produced by: Billy Wilder
- Starring: Dean Martin; Kim Novak; Ray Walston; Felicia Farr; Cliff Osmond
- Cinematography: Joseph LaShelle
- Edited by: Daniel Mandell
- Music by: André Previn
- Production company: The Mirisch Corporation
- Distributed by: Lopert Pictures Corporation; United Artists
- Release date: December 22, 1964
- Running time: 126 minutes
- Country: United States
- Language: English
- Box office: $5 million

Kiss Me, Stupid is a 1964 American sex comedy film produced and directed by Billy Wilder, and starring Dean Martin, Kim Novak, and Ray Walston.

The screenplay by Wilder and I. A. L. Diamond is based on the play L'ora della fantasia (The Dazzling Hour) by Anna Bonacci, which had inspired Wife for a Night (Moglie per una notte, 1952), an Italian film starring Gina Lollobrigida. The comic song lyrics were written by Ira Gershwin, using some of George Gershwin's unpublished melodies.

The supporting cast features Felicia Farr and comedy actors Cliff Osmond, Howard McNear, Cliff Norton, Mel Blanc, and Henry Gibson.

== Plot ==
While driving his Dual-Ghia from Las Vegas to Los Angeles, lecherous, heavy-drinking pop singer Dino is forced to detour through Climax, Nevada. There, he meets the amateur songwriting team of Barney Millsap, a gas station attendant, and piano teacher Orville J. Spooner, a man easily given to jealousy. Hoping to interest Dino in their songs, Barney disables the "Italian" sports car and tells Dino he will need to remain in town until new parts arrive from LA or possibly even Milan. (Note: Dual-Ghia was actually an American marque, mating a Dodge frame, drivetrain, and engine with Italian coachwork.)

Orville invites Dino to stay with him and wife Zelda, but becomes concerned when he learns the singer needs to have sex every night to avoid awakening with a headache. Anxious to accommodate Dino but safeguard his marriage, Orville deliberately provokes an argument with his wife Zelda that leads to Zelda fleeing in tears. He and Barney then arrange for Polly the Pistol, a waitress and prostitute at a saloon on the edge of town called the Belly Button, to pose as Orville's wife and satisfy Dino.

That evening, after the three have dinner, Orville plays his tunes for Dino on the piano and Polly requests a particular song. It is one she knows he wrote for his wife when trying to persuade her to marry him. Doing so, Orville is overcome with emotion, as is Polly, who has fallen a little for the dream of a domestic life that she does not have. Under the influence of wine and song, Orville starts thinking of Polly as his wife and gets Dino to leave them. He then spends the night with Polly.

Dino seeks shelter at the Belly Button, where Zelda earlier had gone to drown her sorrows. When she became drunk and rowdy, the manager deposited her in Polly's trailer to sleep. Hearing about the talents of Polly the Pistol and declaring himself eager "to shoot it out with her", Dino goes to the trailer and finds Zelda there, mistaking her for Polly. A longtime fan, she succumbs to Dino's charms and allows him to seduce her, while simultaneously convincing him of how perfect Orville's song would be for him. Zelda meets Polly the next morning and figures out the trick Orville played on her. She gives Dino's money to Polly, who uses it to leave Climax and start a new life.

A few nights later, Orville is distraught knowing that Zelda intends to divorce him, with Barney serving as a witness for her. Suddenly, Orville and Barney hear Dino performing one of their songs on national television. Orville is at a total loss as to how this could have happened, and as he seeks an explanation, Zelda simply orders him: "Kiss me, stupid."

== Cast ==
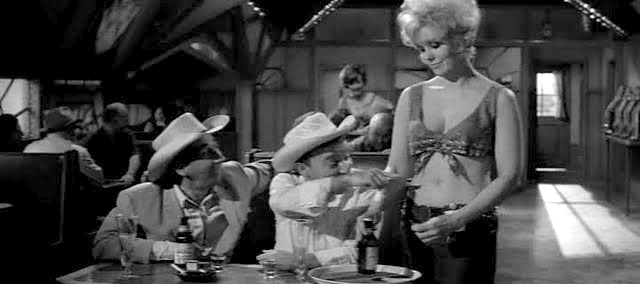
Henry Gibson (middle) and Kim Novak (right)

- Dean Martin as Dino
- Kim Novak as Polly the Pistol
- Ray Walston as Orville Spooner
- Felicia Farr as Zelda Spooner
- Cliff Osmond as Barney Millsap
- Barbara Pepper as Big Bertha
- Doro Merande as Mrs. Pettibone
- Tommy Nolan as Johnnie Mulligan
- Alice Pearce as Mrs. Mulligan
- John Fiedler as Reverend Carruthers
- Howard McNear as Mr. Pettibone
- Cliff Norton as Mack Gray
- Mel Blanc as Dr. Sheldrake
- Henry Gibson as Smith

== Production ==
Wilder initially offered the role of Orville Spooner to Jack Lemmon (Farr's real life husband), whom he had directed in Some Like It Hot, The Apartment, and Irma la Douce, but prior commitments forced the actor to decline. The director then signed Peter Sellers for the role. Six weeks into filming, Sellers suffered a series of 13 heart attacks and was hospitalized in Cedars of Lebanon Hospital. Upon his release, the actor returned to England under doctor's orders. Unwilling to wait while Sellers completed a six-month recuperation period, Wilder opted to replace him and reshoot all his scenes.

The role of Polly the Pistol was written with Marilyn Monroe in mind. After her death in August 1962, filming was postponed while the role was recast. It was later reported that Jayne Mansfield would take over the role, but she had to withdraw from the project because of her pregnancy with future actress Mariska Hargitay. Sometime thereafter, it was decided that Kim Novak would play the role, coming out of a two-year absence from acting to appear in the film.

Wilder approached friend Ira Gershwin and asked if he would like to collaborate on the songs written by Barney and Orville. Gershwin suggested he write lyrics to unpublished music by his late brother George, and as a result three new songs by the Gershwins – "Sophia", "I'm a Poached Egg", and "All the Livelong Day" – debuted in the film. The film was shot on location in Twentynine Palms, California. The opening sequence was filmed at the Sands Hotel in Las Vegas, using a portion of Dean Martin's actual show and the hotel's marquee from his appearance there. Some interior scenes were filmed in the Moulin Rouge night club in Los Angeles. The car that Martin drove was his own.

The Catholic Legion of Decency strongly objected to the completed film. Wilder was willing to soften the suggestion Zelda had committed adultery with Dino, but he refused to comply with other demands, and the film was condemned, the first American film to be so designated since Baby Doll in 1956. As a direct result of the rating, United Artists decided to release the film under the banner of Lopert Pictures, a subsidiary previously used for imported films.

In 2002 a print was shown in several U.S. cities containing the originally-shot seduction scene in Polly's trailer (seen in European exhibition), rather than the tamer replacement Wilder has supplied in hope of satisfying the Catholic Legion of Decency.

Wilder rarely mentioned the film in later interviews, although he discussed it briefly for On Sunset Boulevard: The Life and Times of Billy Wilder, a biography by Ed Sikov. "I don't know why the film shocked people. It's the most bourgeois film there is," he declared. "A man wants a career and the person who wants to help him wants to sleep with his wife. He replaces his wife with another, but when he is nearest to success, he refuses it and throws the guy out . . . The public accepted it better in The Apartment because it was better conceived, better written, better lubricated."

Wilder also discussed Kiss Me, Stupid in director Cameron Crowe's 1998 book Conversations With Wilder, citing his admiration for Dean Martin, saying "there was much more, 90 percent more, to him than just the jokester. I am a sucker for Dean Martin. I thought he was the funniest man in Hollywood." The movie's use of an unflattering version of Dean Martin ("Dino") was a forerunner of the current trend of celebrities doing comic send-ups of themselves on film.

== Critical reception ==
Like The Carpetbaggers of the same year, the film was widely considered to be vulgar by critics. It became one of the targets for denunciations of the negative impact of films on society. Bosley Crowther blamed both films for giving American movies the reputation of "deliberate and degenerate corruptors of public taste and morals". A. H. Weiler of the New York Times called the film "pitifully unfunny" and "obvious, plodding, short on laughs and performances and long on vulgarity." He added, "The finesse, speed, artistry and imagination of . . . Some Like It Hot are sadly missing in this pungent exercise. Instead, we have cheapness that will not shock a grownup. However, this heavy-handed sex fable does call for a light, subtle approach that is rarely apparent."

The Time review called the film "a jape that seems to have scraped its blue-black humor off the floor of a honky-tonk nightclub" and "professionally shrewd and zippy [with] a kind of vulgar integrity." It concluded, "The result, spelled out in dialogue that sounds like a series of gamy punch lines, is one of the longest traveling-salesman stories ever committed to film. Like all dirty jokes, it will probably evoke a shock wave of self-conscious laughter and pass swiftly into oblivion."

Variety said the script "calls for a generous seasoning of Noël Coward but, unfortunately, it provides a dash of same only now and again . . . Wilder, usually a director of considerable flair and inventiveness (if not always impeccable taste), has not been able this time out to rise above a basically vulgar, as well as creatively delinquent, screenplay, and he has got at best only plodding help from two of his principals, Dean Martin and Kim Novak . . . [He] has directed with frontal assault rather than suggestive finesse."

Michael Scheinfeld of TV Guide rated the film 3½ out of four stars, calling it "a kind of cinematic litmus test that separates the casual Billy Wilder fan from the true connoisseur" and "a monument of satirical tastelessness that . . . in retrospect, is now seen as one of Wilder's most fascinatingly original films." He added, "Amid the [original] furor, it's easy to miss the film's comedic accomplishments, which are considerable. Its idiomatic wordplay and social satire is vintage Wilder, and the opening sequence where Dino performs in a nightclub is one of the funniest things that Wilder has ever done. Sprinkling in bad jokes and Rat Pack references, Dean Martin's comic timing and delivery is impeccable . . . The rest of the cast is equally superb, right down to the smallest bit part . . . although Ray Walston's relentless mugging becomes a bit much."

In 2002, J. Hoberman of The Village Voice discussed the film when Film Forum in Manhattan ran a restored print. He observed, "The first half is an unending parade of smutty gags and single entendres, with a few toilet jokes thrown in for good measure. The constant tumult in the Spooners' cramped bungalow betrays the movie's stage origins, and indeed, Climax itself is an appropriately desolate stage-set. Kiss Me, Stupid is likely Wilder's harshest view of the American landscape since the orchestrated media feeding frenzy of Ace in the Hole . . . The rancid atmosphere conceals the virtues of the movie's classical structure, detailed mise-en-scène, and deft comic timing . . . Kiss Me, Stupid's mutually redemptive adultery is closer to the grown-up world of John Cassavetes's Faces than to Wilder's adolescent Seven Year Itch — but it's ultimately a more knowingly tolerant, not to mention funnier, movie than either."

== Home media ==
Olive Films released the film on DVD and Blu-ray on February 17, 2015.
