= Ilya Lopert =

American film producer

Ilya Lopert (May 1, 1905 – February 27, 1971) was an American film producer and distributor. He was renowned for distributing foreign films for both arthouse and mainstream release in the United States. He was often credited as I. E. Lopert.

== Biography ==
Lopert studied electrical engineering after the First World War in Switzerland, in Belgium at the University of Ghent, and the University of Grenoble from 1930 to 1933. He held a variety of jobs in France and the French Sudan. Fluent in French, German, Italian, Russian, Polish and English as well as his native Lithuanian, he found himself employed by Paramount Pictures studios in Paris where he dubbed American films into Spanish. He accompanied his wife to the United States in 1936, and found work in Hollywood preparing American films for the South American market.

== Film distribution ==
Lopert formed Pax Films and Juno Films to distribute foreign films in the US, most famously Mayerling (1936). He became head of foreign film distribution for MGM, resigning in 1946 to become an independent distributor. Lopert remarked that prior to World War II only 12 foreign films a year played in the United States and it was impossible to make a living distributing foreign language films in America.

Lopert Films was created in 1947 to release foreign films in the USA such as Shoeshine (1946), Richard III (1955), and Nights of Cabiria (1957). Lopert produced Summertime (1955) for David Lean and Katharine Hepburn and also owned two cinemas in Washington D.C. the DuPont and Playhouse and one cinema in New York City, the Plaza.

Though critically acclaimed, his films were American box office failures that forced him to sell his theatres. In 1958, United Artists bought Lopert Films, renaming them Lopert Pictures to release foreign films that may attract controversy by being in violation of the Production Code of the time. Lopert Pictures first release for United Artists was Black Orpheus (1959) followed by the smash hit Never on Sunday (1960). In 1961, Lopert became United Artists' coordinator of European Production.

In addition to foreign films, Lopert films also released Billy Wilder's Kiss Me, Stupid (1964).

At the 1964 Academy Awards presentation, Ilya Lopert, representing United Artists, accepted, without saying a word, the best picture Oscar for Tom Jones on behalf of the film's producers who made no move to attend, and were thus ostracized.

The arthouse film industry collapsed in the United States in 1970, Variety reporting that for the first time in six years not one foreign language film grossed over one million dollars. This trend and other factors affecting Hollywood at the end of the 1960s led United Artists to close Lopert films in 1970. He had a daughter, Tanya Lopert, who became an actress.
