= The Stepford Wives (1975 film) =

1975 film by Bryan Forbes

- Theatrical release poster
- Directed by: Bryan Forbes
- Screenplay by: William Goldman
- Based on: The Stepford Wives by Ira Levin
- Produced by: Edgar J. Scherick
- Starring: Katharine Ross; Paula Prentiss; Peter Masterson; Nanette Newman; Tina Louise; Patrick O'Neal
- Cinematography: Owen Roizman
- Edited by: Timothy Gee
- Music by: Michael Small
- Production company: Palomar Pictures
- Distributed by: Columbia Pictures
- Release dates: January 22, 1975 (United States, Limited); February 12, 1975 (United States, Nationwide)
- Running time: 115 minutes
- Country: United States
- Language: English
- Box office: $4 million

The Stepford Wives is a 1975 American satirical psychological thriller film directed by Bryan Forbes. It was written by William Goldman, who based his screenplay on Ira Levin's 1972 novel of the same name. The film stars Katharine Ross as an ambitious freelance photographer who relocates with her meek husband (Peter Masterson) and children from New York City to the affluent Connecticut community of Stepford. Over time she comes to find that all women, including the free-spirited, eventually live lives of unwavering subservience to their husbands.

Filmed in Connecticut in 1974, The Stepford Wives was released theatrically by Columbia Pictures in February 1975. It grossed $4 million at the U.S. box office, though it received mixed reviews from critics. Katharine Ross was nominated for the Saturn Award for Best Actress for her performance in the film. The film was shot entirely on location in Connecticut, primarily in the towns of Darien, Westport, and Fairfield, with no sets built for the production. Reaction from feminist activists was also divided at the time of its release; Betty Friedan dismissed it as a "rip-off of the women's movement" and discouraged women from seeing it, though others such as Gael Greene and Eleanor Perry defended the film.

The Stepford Wives has grown in stature as a cult film over the years, and the term Stepford or Stepford wife has become a popular science fiction concept. Several sequels to the film were made, as well as a remake in 2004 that used the same title.

== Plot ==
Joanna Eberhart, a young wife and aspiring photographer, moves with her husband Walter and their two daughters, Kim and Amy, from Manhattan to Stepford, Connecticut. She finds that the women in town all look flawless and are obsessed with housework but lack intellectual interests. The men all belong to the exclusionary Men's Association, which Walter joins to Joanna's dismay. Joanna is also bewildered by her neighbor Carol Van Sant's sexual submissiveness to her husband Ted and her odd, repetitive behavior after a minor car accident.

Joanna befriends Bobbie Markowe, with whom she finds common interests and shared ideas. Along with trophy wife Charmaine Wimperis, the three organize a women's liberation meeting, but the gathering is a failure when the other wives continually divert the discussion to cleaning products. Joanna is also unimpressed by the boorish Men's Association members, including the intimidating president, Dale "Diz" Coba. When Charmaine returns from a weekend trip with her husband as a devoted wife who has fired her maid and destroyed her tennis court, Joanna and Bobbie start investigating the reason behind the submissive behavior of the other wives. They discover that all the women were once strong, assertive, independent, and staunch advocates of liberal social policies.

Bobbie and Joanna start house hunting in other towns. Later, Joanna wins a prestigious contract with a photo gallery. When she goes to tell Bobbie, she is shocked to find that Bobbie has abruptly become another conformist housewife with no intention of moving. She visits a psychiatrist, to whom she voices her belief that the men in the town are in a conspiracy that involves altering the psyches of the women. The psychiatrist recommends that she leave town until she feels safe. Joanna returns home to pick up her children only to find that they are missing and Walter is evasive about their whereabouts. The two get in a scuffle when she refuses her husband's demands to lie down in her bed. Joanna sneaks out to Bobbie's house but grows frustrated when Bobbie refuses to engage with her in a meaningful way. Desperate and disturbed, Joanna cuts her hand before stabbing Bobbie with a kitchen knife. Bobbie does not bleed but instead malfunctions, revealing that the real Bobbie has been replaced by a robot.

Joanna returns home and bludgeons Walter with a fire poker, demanding to know where their children were taken. He tells her that the kids are at the Men's Association. She sneaks into the mansion that houses the Men's Association. However, she is confronted by Dale, who says that her children are really with Charmaine. He remotely locks the front door, explaining that the men of Stepford replace their wives "because they can.” He takes the poker from her, at which point she flees, coming upon her own robot replica that calmly approaches her to strangle her, implying that the real wives had all been murdered.

Some time later, the android Joanna placidly peruses the local supermarket among the other glamorously dressed wives. As the wives make their way through the store, they vacantly greet one another, while an African American couple argue about their recent move to Stepford (it is implied that the woman will be the next victim of the Men's Association conspiracy). The camera pans in on Joanna's eyes, signifying that the robot now has the eyes of its original human counterpart.

During the end credits, photographs show a smiling Walter driving the family car and picking up his new "Stepford wife" from the supermarket with their children in the back seat as they become another "perfect" Stepford family.

== Cast ==
- Katharine Ross as Joanna Eberhart
- Paula Prentiss as Bobbie Markowe
- Peter Masterson as Walter Eberhart
- Nanette Newman as Carol Van Sant
- Tina Louise as Charmaine Wimperis
- Carol Rossen as Dr. Fancher
- William Prince as Ike Mazzard
- Patrick O'Neal as Dale "Diz" Coba
- Carole Mallory as Kit Sundersen
- Toni Reid as Marie Axhelm
- Judith Baldwin as Patricia Cornell
- Barbara Rucker as Mary Ann Stavros
- George Coe as Claude Axhelm
- Franklin Cover as Ed Wimperis
- Robert Fields as Raymond Chandler
- Michael Higgins as Frank Cornell
- Josef Sommer as Ted Van Sant
- Remak Ramsay as Mr. Atkinson
- Mary Stuart Masterson as Kim Eberhart
- Ronny Sullivan as Amy Eberhart
- Tom Spratley as Charlie the Doorman
- Dee Wallace as Nettie the Maid

== Analysis ==
Film scholar John Kenneth Muir interprets The Stepford Wives as "a film essay about what it means to be part of an unspoken 'underclass.'"

== Production ==
=== Development ===
Film rights to the novel were purchased by producer Edgar Scherick, who ran Palomar Pictures. Scherick said the novel "titillated me. That men would order women to get bigger tits."

He hired William Goldman to write the script. Goldman said "I've always avoided doing movies that had many central, crucial female roles. But I don't think I write women very well. And when I read the Levin novel, I thought, 'Hey, I can make this play'... The reason I did it, besides liking the novel, was that I thought it was an opportunity for me to try and write two women that I could make real."

Brian De Palma was initially going to direct, as Scherick had admired his film Sisters. However the producer says Goldman threatened to leave the film if this happened.

Goldman recalled "Stepford was a troubled production—we’d had difficulty finding a director. Preliminary casting had turned out to be a bitch." Scherick recruited English director Bryan Forbes to direct the film. Forbes later recalled "Scherick called me up and said, “Do you want to direct The Stepford Wives? I want an Englishman to do it, to get a new slant on it.”... I had a lot of fun doing it, and I never took it too seriously." The director claimed Scherick later told him the producer offered Forbes the job because he admired Forbes' Seance on a Wet Afternoon. Forbes said he saw the novel "as a savage put down of men".

=== Clashes with Goldman ===
According to Goldman "Bryan rewrote all of Stepford, until the last twenty minutes of the film, which is mine. He would have rewritten that, too, but he didn't have any time. I'm not saying that it would have been better if it had been mine; but I'm saying it isn't mine, and I wanted my name off it, and they didn't take it off." Forbes admitted to rewriting the film, but says he changed the ending from Goldman's version which Forbes claims was too horrific. Bryan Forbes later wrote:

Between visits to his analyst, he [Goldman] was reluctant to change a single word of his adaptation, despite frequent urgings from Edgar Scherick and myself since we both felt it required improvement. Goldman has subsequently revealed his aversion to directors, especially directors who are also screenwriters and, in particular, British directors. He treated any script revisions from me as an affront to his dignity, for he had a monopoly of reverence for himself. With the first day of principal photography looming every closer without any real progress, we eventually came to an acrimonious parting of the ways. The final script that reached the screen was mine, and it differed greatly from Goldman’s.

Forbes noted Goldman did not take his name off the script, suggesting it was because "that would have deprived him of his residuals."

Tension between Goldman and Forbes was further exacerbated by conflicts over casting (see below).

=== Casting ===
Forbes later wrote that casting was difficult, in part because he needed to get approval from the chief executive of Palomar. He claims he interviewed and considered twenty-one actresses and "cast the film several times, only to have my choices rejected by the front office."

Forbes met with Diane Keaton to play the lead role of Joanna but says the morning after their meeting she turned down the part because her analyst did not like the script. The part was then offered to Jean Seberg who declined. Tuesday Weld initially accepted but cancelled a week before filming began. Forbes later wrote "I obtained agreement for another star and had her costumed, only to be told that she had failed the medical examination and therefore could not be insured." He did not reveal if this was Seberg, Weld or another actor. The lead role eventually went to Katharine Ross.

Joanna Cassidy was cast as Joanna's friend and ally Bobbie but was fired after two weeks of production - Forbes claims this was the producer's decision - and replaced by Paula Prentiss. The movie would be Prentiss' sole hit from the 1970s.

Tension developed between Forbes and screenwriter Goldman over the casting of Nanette Newman (Forbes's wife) as one of the wives. Goldman felt that the 40-year-old Newman's appearance did not match the young provocatively-dressed model-like women he'd scripted for. "She destroyed the reality of a story that was only precariously real to begin with," Goldman wrote. However Goldman did not complain to the producer because "the last thing Edgar needed was a hysterical writer predicting Doomsday because a good actress was suggested to appear in the movie. Besides, being his wife meant security for Bryan, his family would be around, he wouldn’t be as much a stranger in a very strange land." Forbes later took exception to Goldman's criticisms of his wife.

Mary Stuart Masterson (daughter of star Peter Masterson), Dee Wallace and Franklin Cover appear in very small supporting roles. Tina Louise was cast as another doomed wife.

=== Filming ===
Scheduling difficulties delayed the filming from 1973 until 1974.

No exterior sets were built for the film, which was shot on location in several Connecticut towns. The climax was filmed at the Lockwood-Mathews Mansion in Norwalk. Forbes purposefully chose white and bright colors, attempting to make a "thriller in sunlight". With the exception of the stormy night finale, it is almost over-saturated to emphasize bright lights and cheerful-looking settings.

Nanette Newman claimed Forbes had deliberately filmed the ending "in an unreal way, so they were almost like a ballet moving in and out, up and down the aisle." The grocery store was a Grand Union in Darien. It was operated as a Grand Union until 2000, when it was bought by Shaw's. It operated as a Shaw's until 2010, when it was purchased by Stop & Shop and still operates as such today.

Actor Peter Masterson secretly called his friend Goldman for input on scenes. Goldman later claimed the film "could have been very strong, but it was rewritten and altered, and I don't think happily." He added, "It was such an unpleasant experience."

== Release ==
The Stepford Wives premiered in the United States on January 22, 1975, in two cities, before a nationwide release on February 12, 1975. Goldman said the film " was probably released badly as far as the people involved in the making of that movie are concerned. It has some exploitable elements, but it wasn’t Halloween. The best way to release it would have been slowly, praying for favorable word of mouth. The studio threw it on the market in hundreds of theatres" because "right then Columbia needed cash flow badly—dollars, and now. Stepford got them some dollars. It was gone in a month, but it served the studio well."

=== Box office ===
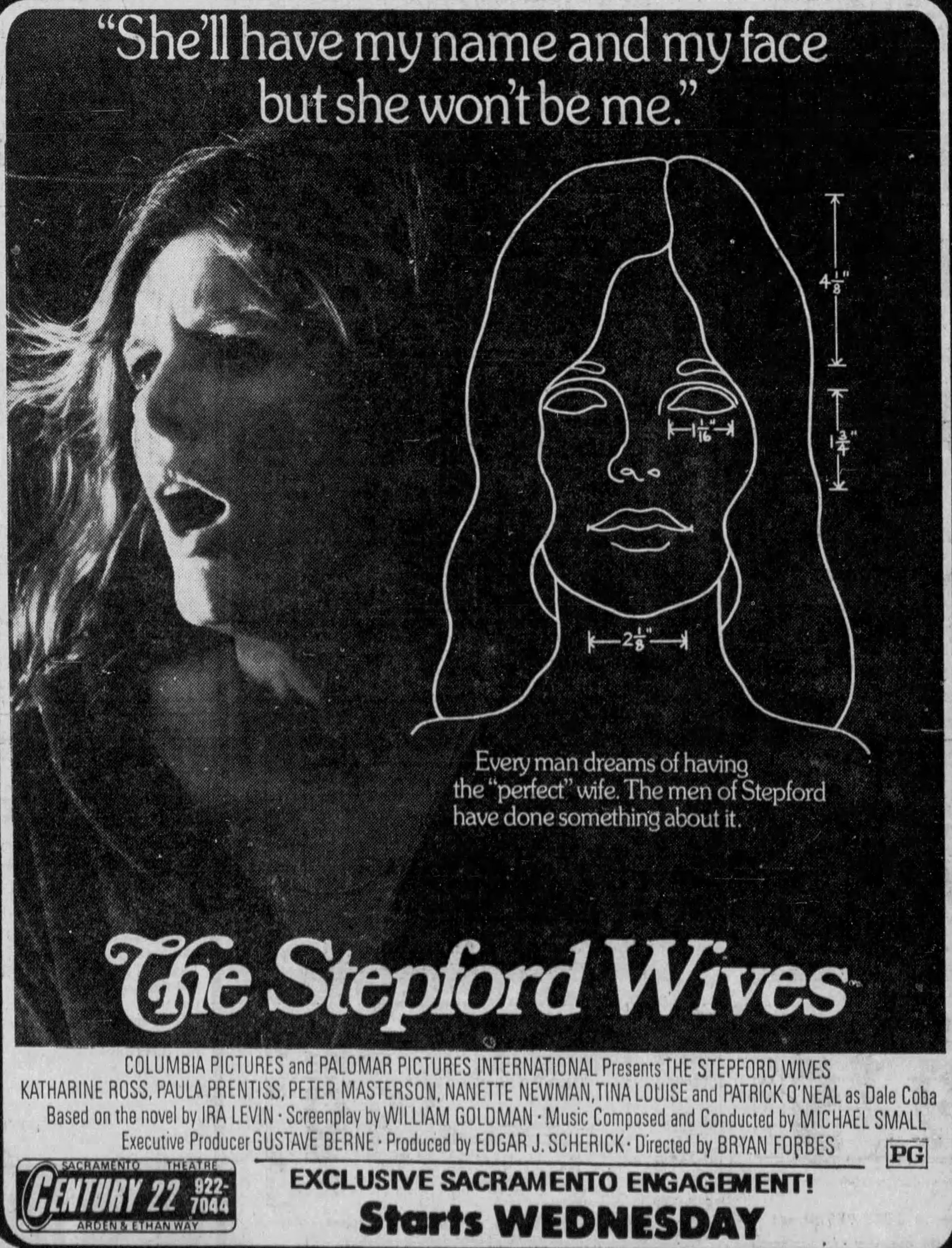
Premiere advertisement, 1975

The film grossed approximately $4 million in North America.

=== Critical response ===
The Stepford Wives has a rating of 55% on Rotten Tomatoes, based on 96 reviews. The site's consensus states: "The Stepford Wives's inherent satire is ill-served by Bryan Forbes' stately direction, but William Goldman's script excels as a damning critique of a misogynistic society." Metacritic, which uses a weighted average, assigned the film a score of 54 out of 100, based on 9 critics, indicating "mixed or average" reviews. Some critics deride its leisurely pace. Most applaud the "quiet, domestic" thrills the film delivers in the final third and earlier sections as "clever, witty, and delightfully offbeat". As for the satire in the film, Roger Ebert wrote that the actresses "have absorbed enough TV, or have such an instinctive feeling for those phony, perfect women in the ads, that they manage all by themselves to bring a certain comic edge to their cooking, their cleaning, their gossiping and their living deaths."

Jerry Oster of the New York Daily News awarded the film a middling two out of four stars, describing the screenplay as a "tedious" and "padded" adaptation of the source material.

Variety summarized the film as "a quietly freaky suspense-horror story" and praised Ross's performance as "excellent and assured." John Seymour of the Santa Maria Times also gave the film a favorable review, deeming it an "epic nightmare" boasting "gripping drama."

Devan Coggan of Entertainment Weekly wrote that the finale was "deeply divisive" and the actress for Joanna stated retrospectively that if she was to revise the ending she would have Joanna "fight harder".

==== Reaction from feminists ====
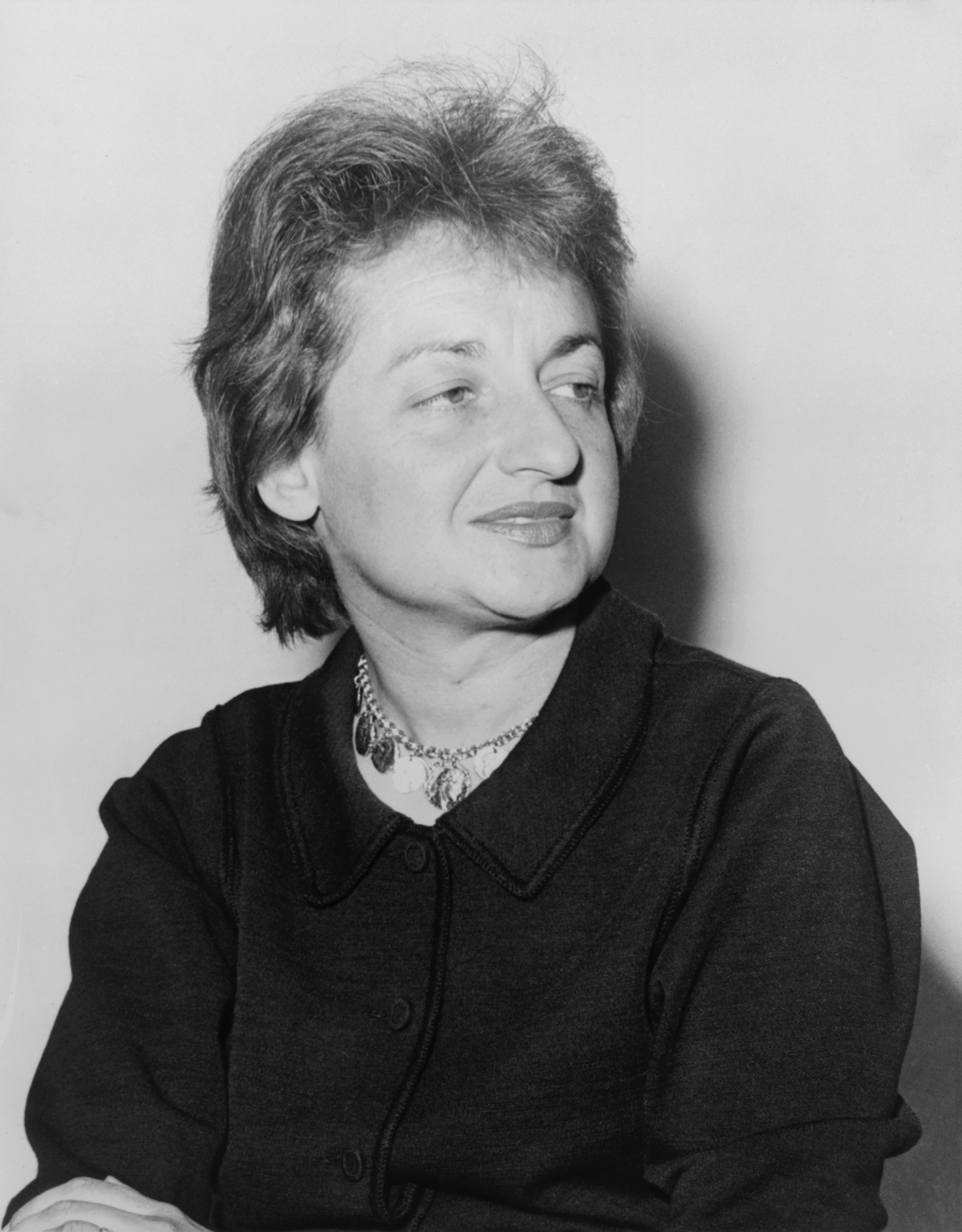
Feminist Betty Friedan deemed the film a "rip-off" of the women's movement

Initial reaction to the film by feminist groups was not favorable, with one studio screening for feminist activists being met with "hisses, groans, and guffaws." Cast and crew disagreed with the perceived anti-woman interpretations, with Newman recalling "Bryan [Forbes] always used to say, 'If anything, it's anti-men!'" Despite Betty Friedan's The Feminine Mystique being a major influence on the original novel upon which the film was based, Friedan's response to the film was highly critical, calling it "a rip-off of the women's movement." Friedan commented that women should boycott the film and attempt to diminish any publicity for it.

Writer Gael Greene, however, lauded the film, commenting: "I loved it—those men were like a lot of men I've known in my life." Feminist screenwriter Eleanor Perry came to the film's defense, stating that it "presses buttons that make you furious—the fact that all the Stepford men wanted were big breasts, big bottoms, a clean house, fresh-perked coffee and sex."

==== Accolades ====
Year	Institute	Category	Recipient	Result	Ref.
1975	Saturn Awards	Best Actress	Katharine Ross	Won	
1975	Saturn Awards	Best Science Fiction Film	The Stepford Wives	Nominated	
2001	American Film Institute	100 Years...100 Thrills	The Stepford Wives	Nominated	
2008	American Film Institute	Top 10 Top 10 (Science Fiction)	The Stepford Wives	Nominated	

=== Home media ===
Anchor Bay Entertainment issued The Stepford Wives on VHS on March 10, 1997; they subsequently released a non-anamorphic DVD edition on December 3, 1997. In 2001, Anchor Bay reissued the film in a "Silver Anniversary" edition, featuring an anamorphic transfer as well as bonus interviews with cast and crew. In 2004, Paramount Home Entertainment re-released the "Silver Anniversary" edition, which featured the same bonus materials and screen menus.

As of 2026, the film has not received a Blu-ray or online release, and remains under the ownership of pharmaceutical conglomerate Bristol Myers Squibb, who were stakeholders in its production company, Palomar Pictures, which went defunct after the film's release. Several other Palomar-produced films, including The Heartbreak Kid (1972) and Sleuth (also 1972), are also owned by the company.

== Legacy ==
Film scholar John Kenneth Muir considers The Stepford Wives one of the best horror films of the 1970s. In a writer's roundtable with The Hollywood Reporter, Jordan Peele listed the film as one of the inspirations behind his directorial debut Get Out.

A line delivered by Paula Prentiss, as Bobbie Markowe, after becoming a Stepford Wife; "Yes... this... it's wonderful!", was legally sampled on the song, "Hey Music Lover", by British dance act, S-Express, becoming a big international hit in 1989.

The film influenced the development of the character Bree Van de Kamp played by Marcia Cross in the successful series Desperate Housewives (2004–12). The character was often referred to as a "Stepford Wife" by other characters, due to her somewhat uptight personality, immaculately presented home, beautifully pruned red roses, and her love of baking cakes. She also dressed in a Midwestern, traditional style, echoing, but modernizing, the look of the original "Stepford Wives", as seen in the film.

Director Bryan Forbes later wrote "It remains a favourite film of mine and one that has stood the test of time. Indeed the title has become part of the language and I often hear people say ‘Oh, she’s a real Stepford wife’."

== Related works ==
- Revenge of the Stepford Wives (1980, TV), starring Don Johnson, Sharon Gless and Julie Kavner
- The Stepford Children (1987, TV), starring Barbara Eden and Don Murray
- The Stepford Husbands (1996, TV), starring Donna Mills and Michael Ontkean
- The Stepford Wives (2004, film), starring Nicole Kidman, Glenn Close, Bette Midler and Matthew Broderick

== See also ==
- List of American films of 1975

== Sources ==
- Brady, John Joseph (1981). The craft of the screenwriter : interviews with six celebrated screenwriters. Simon and Schuster.
- Brown, Dennis (1992). Shoptalk. New York City, New York: Newmarket Press. ISBN 978-1-557-04170-8.
- Forbes, Bryan (1993). A Divided Life. London, England: Mandarin. ISBN 978-0-749-30884-1.
- Forbes, Bryan (1998). Introduction. The Stepford Wives. By Levin, Ira. Bloomsbury.
- Goldman, William (1983). Adventures in the screen trade : a personal view of Hollywood and screenwriting. Warner Books.
- Muir, John Kenneth (2012). Horror Films of the 1970s. Vol. 1 (2nd ed.). Jefferson, North Carolina: McFarland. ISBN 978-0-786-43104-5.
