= The Siege =

1998 film by Edward Zwick

- Theatrical release poster
- Directed by: Edward Zwick
- Screenplay by: Lawrence Wright; Menno Meyjes; Edward Zwick
- Story by: Lawrence Wright
- Produced by: Lynda Obst; Edward Zwick
- Starring: Denzel Washington; Annette Bening; Bruce Willis; Tony Shalhoub; Sami Bouajila; David Proval
- Cinematography: Roger Deakins
- Edited by: Steven Rosenblum
- Music by: Graeme Revell
- Production company: Twin River Productions
- Distributed by: 20th Century Fox
- Release date: November 6, 1998
- Running time: 116 minutes
- Country: United States
- Language: English
- Budget: $70 million
- Box office: $116.7 million

The Siege is a 1998 American action thriller film directed and produced by Edward Zwick, who co-wrote the screenplay with Lawrence Wright and Menno Meyjes, from a story by Wright. Starring Denzel Washington, Annette Bening, Tony Shalhoub, and Bruce Willis, the film concerns terrorist cells making several attacks in New York City and the FBI attempts to stop them. Released by 20th Century Fox on November 6, 1998, it received mixed reviews from critics and was a box office disappointment in North America but performed better internationally.

== Plot ==
FBI Special Agent Anthony Hubbard and his Lebanese-American partner Frank Haddad respond to the hijacking of a loaded bus which contains an explosive device. The bomb turns out to be a paint bomb and the terrorists escape. The FBI receives demands to release Sheikh Ahmed Bin Talal, a suspect in an earlier bombing. Hubbard is confronted by CIA operative Elise Kraft while taking a different suspect into custody and arrests her. Later, another terrorist threat is made and a Metropolitan Transportation Authority bus is suicide bombed, killing 25 people. Samir Nazhde admits under interrogation to unwittingly signing the visa application of one of the suicide bombers. Kraft insists that Samir, with whom she has a sexual relationship, is not a terrorist and that his continued freedom is vital to the investigation. Hubbard and his team track down and eliminate the terrorist cell.

Terrorist incidents escalate with the bombing of a crowded theater and a hostage taking at an elementary school. The destruction of One Federal Plaza, the location of the FBI's New York City field office, inflicts more than 600 casualties. The President of the United States declares martial law and the Army's 101st Airborne Division, under Major General William Devereaux, seals off Brooklyn to locate the remaining terrorist cells. All young men of Arab descent, including Haddad's son Frank Jr., are detained in Downing Stadium. Haddad resigns in outrage while New Yorkers stage violent demonstrations against the Army’s occupation and the profiling of Arabs.

Hubbard and Kraft, now revealed to be intelligence operative Sharon Bridger, capture a suspect, Tariq Husseini. Devereaux, who was surveilling Hubbard, tortures and kills Husseini in the course of the interrogation. Husseini was unable to reveal anything valuable because the terrorists compartmentalized information. Sickened, Bridger concedes she trained and supported militants opposed to Saddam Hussein's regime, working with Samir to recruit and train the followers of the Sheikh. Cuts to their funding left the group exposed and she took pity on the few survivors not yet slaughtered by Hussein's forces, arranging their escape to the U.S. Some of those same survivors now used their covert bomb making skills against the country holding their leader. The Sheikh was also apprehended by Devereaux without any consent from the U.S. government.

Devereaux and Hubbard compel Samir to arrange a meeting with the final terrorist cell. Hubbard convinces Haddad to return to the FBI.During a multi-ethnic demonstration march against the occupation of Brooklyn, Hubbard and Haddad arrive at the meeting place to find Bridger and Samir already departed. Samir reveals to Bridger he is the final bomber and predicts "there will never be a last cell." He prepares a suicide vest, intending to kill himself among the marchers. Hubbard and Haddad arrive in time to prevent him from leaving a bathhouse, but Samir shoots Bridger in the stomach. Hubbard and Haddad kill Samir but Bridger succumbs to her wound after invoking the Lord's Prayer and "Inshallah". (Note: The Arabic phrase "God Willing".)

Hubbard, Haddad, and their team raid the Army headquarters to arrest Devereaux for the torture and murder of Husseini and unauthorized confinement of the Sheikh. Devereaux insists the War Powers Resolution and authority vested by the President supersedes the court which issued the arrest warrant. He commands his soldiers to aim at the agents, resulting in a Mexican standoff. Hubbard reminds Devereaux that the civil liberties and human rights which he took from Husseini are what all his predecessors fought and died for. Devereaux submits and is arrested. Martial law ends and the detainees, including Haddad's son, are given their freedom.

== Cast ==
- Denzel Washington as FBI Assistant Special Agent in Charge Anthony 'Hub' Hubbard
- Annette Bening as CIA Operative Sharon Bridger / Elise Kraft
- Bruce Willis as U.S. Army General William Devereaux
- Tony Shalhoub as FBI Special Agent Frank Haddad
- Aasif Mandvi as Khalil Saleh
- Amro Salama as Tariq Husseini
- Sami Bouajila as Samir Nazhde
- Ahmed Ben Larby as Sheik Akhmed Bin Talal
- Lianna Pai as FBI Agent Tina Osu
- Mark Valley as FBI Agent Mike Johanssen
- David Proval as FBI Agent Danny Sussman
- Lance Reddick as FBI Agent Floyd Rose
- Lisa Lynn Masters as Reporter
- Chip Zien as Chief of Staff

Additionally, John Beard, Mary Alice Williams, Sean Hannity, and Curtis Sliwa make appearances, credited as Newscasters.

== Production ==
In February 1997, it was reported that 20th Century Fox was developing Lawrence Wright's script Bang as a project for producers Lynda Obst and Edward Zwick. In January 1998, it was reported that the film was now titled Martial Law and would star Denzel Washington with an intended release for the 1998 holiday season. That same month, Annette Bening was in negotiations to star in the film alongside which Washington which had also been joined by Bruce Willis. Both Zwick and Menno Meyjes wrote the shooting script based on Wright's original Bang script.

== Reception ==
=== Critical response ===
The film received mixed reviews from critics. On the review aggregator website Rotten Tomatoes, 44% of 61 critics' reviews are positive. The website's consensus reads: "An exciting, well-paced action film." Metacritic, which uses a weighted average, assigned the film a score of 53 out of 100, based on 25 critics, indicating "mixed or average" reviews. Audiences polled by CinemaScore gave the film an average grade of "B−" on an A+ to F scale.

Roger Ebert gave the film 2 1/2 stars out of four, writing that director Edward Zwick does a good job with crowd scenes, but criticizing it as clumsy.

Bruce Willis won the Golden Raspberry Award for Worst Actor for his performances in this film, Armageddon, and Mercury Rising.

=== Box office ===
The film grossed $14.7 million on its opening weekend, ranking at number two behind The Waterboy. The film ultimately grossed $40,981,289 in North America and $75,691,623 in other territories on a budget of $70 million. In the film's second week, The Siege showed the teaser trailer for Star Wars: Episode I – The Phantom Menace.

=== Controversy ===
When the film opened, the American-Arab Anti-Discrimination Committee came out against the film. Its spokesman Hussein Ibish said "The Siege is extremely offensive. It's beyond offensive. We're used to offensive, that's become a daily thing. This is actually dangerous." He thought it was "Insidious and incendiary" because it "reinforces stereotypes that lead to hate crimes." Ibish acknowledged that Arab terrorists did, in fact, bomb the World Trade Center in 1993, but said that Arab and Islamic groups are upset by "the very strong equation between Muslim religious practices and terrorism. ...[Thanks to this film] Every time someone goes through the Muslim ablution, the ritual washing of hands everybody does before they pray five times a day, that image is the announcement to the viewer of the presence of violence." Echoing such criticism, the Council on American–Islamic Relations protested the insinuation that "Muslims have total disregard for human life." The groups were "faxing and calling news organizations on a regular basis" to voice their concerns.

Director Edward Zwick had met with Arab Americans, who suggested that the story be changed to mirror the aftermath of the Oklahoma City bombing, when Arabs were immediately assumed responsible. This idea was rejected. Zwick noted that The Siege's villains also include members of the U.S. government, and dismissed the criticism, saying:

Anytime you talk about issues that touch on religion of any kind, you can anticipate this kind of reaction. Should we only present every group as paragons and monoliths of virtue? The movie inspires to engender this kind of dialogue. I happen to come from the school that thinks that movies should not only make you uncomfortable, they might make you think. …You can anticipate any kind of reaction in these times in which sensitivity seems very high in the culture. I have a friend who says, if you've not offended somebody, you're a nobody. …How does it feel to be a lightning rod? It gets the blood going. I think it's better than being universally ignored. In a culture where there seems to be so much to talk about, it's good to be talked about. What the movie is most deeply about – it's about our own latent possibilities of repression, stereotyping and prejudice [...] To see Americans rounded up in the streets, to see Americans put into stadiums, to see people held without habeas corpus – to have their rights violated in such a way is such a chilling and just terrifying thing to see – that is what one takes away, I believe, from this film.

In a September 2007 interview, screenwriter Lawrence Wright attributed the film's failure at the box office to Muslim and Arab protests at theaters playing the film, but also claimed that it was the most rented movie in America after the September 11 attacks.

Scholar Moustafa Bayoumi has also critiqued the racialization of Arabs in the film and suggests it is indicative of an emerging sub-genre defined by "the notion of African-American leadership of the Arab world, intertwined with friendship with it."

Scholar Alexandra Campbell quoted from former Guantanamo Bay detention camp captive Tarek Dergoul when she compared the fictional demonization and extrajudicial abuse of Muslims in the film and the abuse that Dergoul described in his first post-repatriation interview.

On July 12, 2006, the magazine Mother Jones provided excerpts from the transcripts of a selection of the Guantánamo detainees. Yunis Abdurrahman Shokuri was one of the detainees profiled. According to the article, his transcript contained the following comment:

[T]he only way I know the United States is through movies from Hollywood or through cartoons. I’m a big fan of a lot of their singers…. [T]he first time I saw an American soldier was at Kandahar Air Base…. When I first saw myself in Kandahar, it was like I was in a cinema or a movie. I saw a 1998 movie called The Siege. The movie was about terrorists carrying out terrorist attacks in the United States…. [In the movie] the CIA and FBI were not successful in finding that terrorist group and the United States Army interfered and gathered all the people of Arabic descent and put them in a land cage or camp just like it happened in Kandahar. I was shocked, thinking, "Am I in that movie or on a stage in Hollywood?"… Sometimes I laugh at myself and say, "When does that movie end?"
