= Edgar Scherick =

American film producer (1924–2002)

- Born: Edgar J. Scherick; October 16, 1924; New York City, US
- Died: December 2, 2002 (aged 78); Los Angeles, California, US
- Occupations: Film producer, television producer
- Spouses: Margaret Iwasaki; Carol Romann

Edgar J. Scherick (October 16, 1924 – December 2, 2002) was an American television executive and producer of television miniseries, made-for-television films, and theatrical motion pictures.

== Early life and education ==
Scherick was born in New York City, the son of Jennie (née Friedman) and Jacob J. Scherick. He was raised in Long Beach, NY and graduated Long Beach High School in 1941. Upon graduating from high school, he took a job with New York City advertising agency L. H. Hartman as an office boy, attending night classes at the City College of New York.

Scherick was drafted into the Army Air Corps in 1943 and trained as a meteorologist in Grand Rapids, Michigan, then transferred to Windsor Locks, Connecticut before ultimately being posted to Keflavik, Iceland, where he spent the majority of his three years of service. Following the end of the war, Scherick spent a year at Hobart College before transferring to Harvard University, from which he graduated magna cum laude and Phi Beta Kappa.

== Career ==
In 1950, Scherick began working at the Dancer Fitzgerald Sample advertising agency, where he would remain until 1956. He briefly joined CBS Television as a sports specialist in their network sales division, but would leave within the year.

Widely credited as a pioneer in network sports broadcasting, Scherick created the television program ABC's Wide World of Sports at his company Sports Programs, Inc. which he started in 1956 with $600.00. In February 1960, Scherick sold Sports Programs to the American Broadcasting Company for $500,000 in ABC stock, where it became ABC Sports, the sports division of the network. With the acquisition, Scherick was appointed head of the ABC Sports division, then Vice President in charge of Network Sales. In June 1963, Scherick became Vice President of Programming for the ABC Television Network, where he created many popular shows including Bewitched, Batman, That Girl, The Hollywood Palace, and Peyton Place.

After his television career, Edgar Scherick became a film and television producer and executive producer of 75 theatrical films, television movies and mini-series through his company Palomar Pictures International and other entities.

In 1983, Scherick had a cameo role as Wilson Crockett, a network television executive, in the Martin Scorsese film, The King of Comedy.

By January 2, 1990, Scherick had gone to work with Saban Entertainment through its Saban/Scherick Productions division, which was for mostly television movies and mini-series

Scherick hired and served as a mentor to many famous television and theatrical producers and industry executives including Roone Arledge, Brian Grazer, Scott Rudin, Michael Barnathan, Robert Lawrence and David Nicksay.

== Death ==
Scherick died of complications from leukaemia on December 2, 2002.

== Select filmography ==
He was a producer in all films unless otherwise noted.

=== Film ===
Year	Film	Credit	Notes
1968	For Love of Ivy		
1968	The Birthday Party	Executive producer	
1969	Ring of Bright Water	Executive producer	
1969	A Touch of Love	Executive producer	
1969	Take the Money and Run	Executive producer	Uncredited
1970	Jenny		
1970	Homer	Executive producer	
1972	What Became of Jack and Jill?	Executive producer	
1972	To Kill a Clown	Executive producer	
1972	The Darwin Adventure	Executive producer	
1972	Sleuth	Executive producer	Remade in 2007
1972	The Heartbreak Kid		Remade in 2007
1973	Gordon's War	Executive producer	
1974	The Taking of Pelham One Two Three		Remade in 1998 for television and 2009 as a theatrical film
1974	Law and Disorder	Executive producer	
1975	The Stepford Wives		Remade in 2004
1977	I Never Promised You a Rose Garden		
1979	Fish Hawk	Executive producer	
1979	The American Success Company		
1982	Shoot the Moon	Executive producer	
1982	I'm Dancing as Fast as I Can		
1982	White Dog	Executive producer	
1983	He Makes Me Feel Like Dancin'	Executive producer	Film won the Academy Award for Best Documentary Feature
1984	Reckless		
1984	Mrs. Soffel		
1991	Rambling Rose	Executive producer	Final film as a producer
2004	The Stepford Wives		Posthumous credit

As an actor

Year	Film	Role
1982	The King of Comedy	Wilson Crockett

Miscellaneous crew

Year	Film	Role
1979	Fish Hawk	Presenter

=== Television ===
Year	Title	Credit	Notes
1953	Major League Baseball on ABC		
1970	The Man Who Wanted to Live Forever	Executive producer	Television film
1972	When Michael Calls	Executive producer	Television film
1974	Ann in Blue		Television film
1975	The Silence	Executive producer	Television film
1976	Jeremiah of Jacob's Neck	Executive producer	Television film
1976	Raid on Entebbe	Executive producer	Television film
1977	A Circle of Children	Executive producer	Television film
1977	Panic in Echo Park		Television film
1977	ABC Weekend Special		
1978	Zuma Beach	Executive producer	Television film
1978	Thou Shalt Not Commit Adultery	Executive producer	Television film
1979	An American Christmas Carol	Executive producer	Television film
1980	Mother and Daughter: The Loving War	Executive producer	Television film
1980	The Seduction of Miss Leona	Executive producer	Television film
1980	Revenge of the Stepford Wives	Executive producer	Television film
1982	Thou Shalt Not Kill	Executive producer	Television film
1982	Little Gloria... Happy at Last	Executive producer	
1983	He Makes Me Feel Like Dancin'	Executive producer	Won Emmy Award for Outstanding Children's Program
1985	Hitler's SS: Portrait in Evil	Executive producer	Television film
1985	Evergreen	Executive producer	
1986	On Wings of Eagles	Executive producer	
1986	The High Price of Passion	Executive producer	Television film
1987	Stranger in My Bed	Executive producer	Television film
1987	The Stepford Children	Executive producer	Television film
1987	Hands of a Stranger	Executive producer	Television film
1987	Uncle Tom's Cabin	Executive producer	Television film
1987	Home Fires	Executive producer	Television film
1988	Stranger on My Land	Executive producer	Television film
1988	Lovers, Partners & Spies	Executive producer	Television pilot
1988	Unholy Matrimony	Executive producer	Television film
1990	Anything to Survive	Executive producer	Television film
1990	The Kennedys of Massachusetts	Executive producer	
1990	The Secret Life of Ian Fleming	Executive producer	Television film
1990	The Phantom of the Opera	Executive producer	
1990	The Girl Who Came Between Them	Executive producer	Television film
1990	The Rock	Executive producer	
1991	Fever	Executive producer	Television film
1991	The Rape of Doctor Willis	Executive producer	Television film
1992	Till Death Us Do Part	Executive producer	Television film
1992	Scorch	Executive producer	
1992	Quiet Killer	Executive producer	Television film
1992	Nightmare in the Daylight	Executive producer	Television film
1992	Four Eyes and Six Guns	Executive producer	Television film
1994	Betrayed by Love	Executive producer	Television film
1994	A Passion for Justice: The Hazel Brannon Smith Story	Executive producer	Television film
1995	The Good Old Boys	Executive producer	Television film
1995	Tyson	Executive producer	Television film
1996	The Stepford Husbands	Executive producer	Television film
1996	The Siege at Ruby Ridge	Executive producer	Television film
1996	We the Jury	Executive producer	Television film
1998	The Wall	Executive producer	Television film
2002	Path to War	Executive producer	Television film

As an actor

Year	Title	Role	Notes
1985	Murder: By Reason of Insanity	Howard Norton	Television film
1988	A Year in the Life	Gottlieb	
1995	Ed McBain's 87th Precinct: Lightning	McLaughlin	Television film
1995	It Was Him or Us	None	Television film

As writer

Year	Title
1992	Scorch

Miscellaneous crew

Year	Title	Role	Notes
1982	The Scarlet Pimpernel	Production consultant	Television film

== Awards and nominations ==
Scherick's television body of work includes 6 Emmy nominations and one winning Emmy:

- 2002: Outstanding Made For Television Movie – Path To War
- 1990: Outstanding Miniseries – The Kennedys of Massachusetts
- 1986: Outstanding Miniseries – On Wings of Eagles
- 1984: Outstanding Children's Program – He Makes Me Feel Like Dancin' (Winner)
- 1983: Outstanding Drama Special – Little Gloria...Happy at Last
- 1977: Outstanding Special – Drama or Comedy – Raid on Entebbe The Big Event

Many of the theatrical releases that Scherick produced or credited as Executive Producer were nominated for an Academy Award:

- 1968: Best Song (original for the picture) – For Love of Ivy (Quincy Jones, Bob Russell)
- 1972: Best Actor – Sleuth (Michael Caine)
- 1972: Best Actor – Sleuth (Laurence Olivier)
- 1972: Best Director – Sleuth (Joseph L. Mankiewicz)
- 1972: Best Original Dramatic Score - Sleuth (John Addison)
- 1972: Best Actor in a Supporting Role - The Heartbreak Kid (Eddie Albert)
- 1972: Best Actress in a Supporting Role - The Heartbreak Kid (Jeannie Berlin)
- 1977: Best Screenplay (based on material from another medium) – I Never Promised You a Rose Garden (Gavin Lambert, Lewis John Carlino)
- 1983: Best Documentary - He Makes Me Feel Like Dancin' (Emile Ardolino, Producer)
- 1991: Best Actress in a Leading Role - Rambling Rose (Laura Dern)
- 1991: Best Actress in a Supporting Role - Rambling Rose (Diane Ladd)

The film "He Makes Me Feel Like Dancin'" is unique as it was for 31 years, the only production to win both an Oscar and an Emmy. Scherick won the Emmy for Outstanding Children's Program as Executive Producer but due to Academy rules, only the credited "Producer" (not Executive Producer) is eligible for a Best Picture Oscar award.

One film that Scherick was credited as Executive Producer, Path to War from 2002' was nominated for the Golden Globe Award for Best Television Motion Picture. It was the last film Scherick produced during his lifetime.

In 1997, the Producers Guild of America presented Scherick with their "Norman Lear Achievement Award in Television," recognizing his outstanding body of work and lifetime achievement in this medium.

Scherick also served as chair of the Academy of Television Arts & Sciences' Hall of Fame beginning in 1988.

Business positions
Preceded by Thomas W. Moore	Vice President, Programs ABC; 1963–1966	Succeeded by Leonard Goldberg
Preceded by First	President of ABC Sports; 1956–1964	Succeeded by Roone Arledge
