= The Stepford Wives (2004 film) =

2004 film by Frank Oz

- Theatrical release poster
- Directed by: Frank Oz
- Screenplay by: Paul Rudnick
- Based on: The Stepford Wives by Ira Levin
- Produced by: Scott Rudin; Donald De Line; Edgar J. Scherick; Gabriel Grunfeld
- Starring: Nicole Kidman; Matthew Broderick; Bette Midler; Christopher Walken; Roger Bart; Faith Hill; Glenn Close
- Cinematography: Rob Hahn
- Edited by: Jay Rabinowitz
- Music by: David Arnold
- Production companies: Paramount Pictures; DreamWorks Pictures; De Line Pictures; Scott Rudin Productions
- Distributed by: Paramount Pictures (United States and Canada); DreamWorks Pictures (International)
- Release date: June 11, 2004
- Running time: 93 minutes
- Country: United States
- Language: English
- Budget: $90–100 million
- Box office: $103.3 million

The Stepford Wives is a 2004 American science fiction comedy film directed by Frank Oz from a screenplay by Paul Rudnick and starring Nicole Kidman, Matthew Broderick, Bette Midler, Christopher Walken, Faith Hill, and Glenn Close. The second feature-length adaptation of Ira Levin's 1972 novel of the same name following the 1975 film of the same name, this film was released on June 11, 2004 by Paramount Pictures in the United States and by DreamWorks Pictures in other territories. The film received generally negative reviews from critics and was a box-office failure, grossing $103.3 million worldwide on a $90–100 million budget.

== Plot ==
Joanna Eberhart's successful career as an executive producer and president of reality television network EBS abruptly ends after Hank, a disillusioned reality show participant, attempts to murder Joanna during an upfront presentation. After Joanna's boss Helen Devlin fires her, she suffers a mental breakdown. She and her husband, Walter Kresby, who also works at EBS, and their two children, Pete and Kimberly, leave Manhattan and relocate to Fairfield County, Connecticut, a suburb of Stepford. Upon arrival, Joanna befriends feminist writer and recovering alcoholic Roberta "Bobbie" Markowitz and flamboyant gay architect Roger Bannister, who relocated to Stepford with his partner Jerry, a corporate lawyer.

After the trio witness Sarah Sunderson violently dance and then collapse, Joanna argues about it with Walter. Walter bluntly says that their children barely know her, their marriage is collapsing, and her domineering nature offends people. Joanna agrees to do better by attempting to assimilate with the other wives. The next day, Joanna, Bobbie, and Roger go to check up on Sarah. Upon entering the house, they hear her upstairs, ecstatically screaming during sex with her husband Herb. While sneaking out, they find a remote control labeled "SARAH." As they unwittingly manipulate it, Sarah's breasts enlarge and she robotically walks backward.

One evening, Walter and Dave, Bobbie's husband, visit the Men's Association with Roger and Jerry. Joanna and Bobbie sneak inside to spy on the men. They discover a hallway filled with odd family portraits; Roger then appears and reassures them all is well. The next day, the pair discover Roger's flamboyant designer clothing and other personal mementos in the trash. At the town hall, Roger, apparently running for Connecticut State Senate, now has a bland look and conformist personality, all at Jerry's direction. While using Walter's computer, Joanna discovers that all the Stepford wives were once working women in high-power professions.

The next day, Joanna visits Bobbie. Her formerly messy house is spotless, and, now a blonde, she is wearing a frilly dress. Bobbie now blends in with the other Stepford wives. Bobbie offers to help Joanna change, obliviously setting her own hand on fire while resting it on a stove burner. Joanna intends to flee the town, but discovers Walter has taken the children out of the day camp. She goes to the Men's Association, where the neighborhood's husbands imposingly surround her. Walter laments that Joanna has always emasculated him. Mike Wellington, the president of the Men's Association, explains how nanochips are inserted into the wives' brains to convert them into poised, submissive Stepford Wives. Mike ushers the reluctant couple into the transformation chamber. Joanna is next seen at the grocery store, now with long blonde hair and a sundress, seemingly having gone through the transformation.

During a formal ball, Joanna distracts Mike and entices him into the garden while Walter slips into the transformation room. He destroys the software that programs the women. The wives and Roger, no longer under control, confront their husbands and partners. Walter and Joanna reveal that they never underwent the microchip implant. When Mike engages Walter, Joanna decapitates him with a candlestick, exposing him as a fully animatronic robot. Mike's wife, Claire, is revealed as the mastermind and explains that she created Stepford. She explains that she was once a career-minded woman just like Joanna. When she discovered the real Mike's affair with her 21-year-old research assistant Patricia, she jealously killed them before using her skills as a brain surgeon to develop the Stepford Wives program for improving marriages. Claire then fatally electrocutes herself by kissing Mike's severed robotic head.

Six months later, Joanna has received six Emmys for producing the documentary Stepford: The Secret of the Suburbs, while Roger has won his State Senate seat as an Independent and Bobbie has written and published her first book of poetry Wait Until He's Asleep, Then Cut It Off. In an interview with Larry King, Joanna expressed contentment of her and Walter's improved marriage as he looks on with a smile with their kids. Joanna, Roger, and Bobbie then explain that the Stepford husbands have been placed under house arrest for their crimes and are being "retrained" by their wives, who have taken over the town.

== Cast ==
- Nicole Kidman as Joanna Eberhart
- Matthew Broderick as Walter Kresby
- Bette Midler as Roberta "Bobbie" Markowitz
- Glenn Close as Claire Wellington
- Christopher Walken as Michael "Mike" Wellington
- Roger Bart as Roger Bannister
- Faith Hill as Sarah Sunderson
- Jon Lovitz as Dave Markowitz
- David Marshall Grant as Jerry Harmon
- Matt Malloy as Herb Sunderson
- Dylan Hartigan as Pete Kresby
- Fallon Brooking as Kimberly Kresby
- Kate Shindle as Beth Peters
- Lorri Bagley as Charmaine Van Sant
- Lisa Lynn Masters as Carol Wainwright
- Robert Stanton as Ted Van Sant
- Mike White as Hank
- Carrie Preston as Barbara
- KaDee Strickland as Tara
- Larry King as Himself
- Meredith Vieira as host of Balance of Power
- Billy Bush as host of I Can Do Better
- Mary Beth Peil as Helen Devlin

== Production ==
John Cusack and his sister Joan were originally cast as Walter and Bobbie, respectively, but both had to drop out of the film only weeks before filming started to be with their father Dick, who was dying. Joan had previously appeared in two other films written by Paul Rudnick, Addams Family Values and In & Out (the latter also directed by Frank Oz, for which she was nominated for an Academy Award).

Reportedly, there were problems on-set between Oz and stars Nicole Kidman, Bette Midler, Christopher Walken, Glenn Close, and Roger Bart. In a 2003 interview, Oz stated, "Tension on the set? Absolutely! In every movie I do, there's tension. That's the whole point. And working people hard, that's exactly what they expect me to do [...] Bette has been under a lot of stress lately [...] She made the mistake of bringing her stress on the set."

The film was originally conceived as a darkly satirical piece with an ending closer to the finale of the original but negative results from test screenings caused Paramount to commission numerous rounds of reshoots which significantly altered the tone of the film and gave it a new ending.

In a 2005 interview Matthew Broderick stated, "Making that film wasn't enjoyable. It was nobody's fault but my part was not terribly interesting [...] It was not a thrilling film. I would hate it if it were my last."

In a 2007 interview with Ain't It Cool News, Oz's take on the film was "I had too much money and I was too responsible and concerned for Paramount. I was too concerned for the producers. And I didn't follow my instincts."

The majority of the film was shot in Darien, New Canaan, and Norwalk, Connecticut.

== Reception ==
=== Critical reception ===
On Rotten Tomatoes, The Stepford Wives holds an approval rating of 25% based on 175 reviews, with an average rating of 4.7/10. The website's critical consensus reads, "In exchanging the chilling satire of the original into mindless camp, this remake has itself become Stepford-ized." Metacritic, which uses a weighted average, assigned the film a score of 42 out of 100, based on 40 critics, indicating "mixed or average" reviews. Audiences polled by CinemaScore gave the film an average grade of "C+" on an A+ to F scale.

Pete Travers of Rolling Stone said that the on-set complications of the film "can't compare to the mess onscreen." Lisa Schwarzbaum of Entertainment Weekly said, "The remake is, in fact, marooned in a swamp of camp, inconsequentiality." A. O. Scott of The New York Times said, "the movie never lives up to its satiric potential, collapsing at the end into incoherence and wishy-washy, have-it-all sentimentality."

Some critics were more receptive to the film. Roger Ebert called Paul Rudnick's screenplay "rich with zingers" and gave the film three stars.

The film's teaser won several Golden Trailer Awards in the categories of "Summer 2004 Blockbuster" and "Most Original", as well as "Best of Show".

=== Box office ===
The U.S. opening weekend grossed a solid $21.4 million, but sales declined sharply afterward. That weekend represented over a third of the final domestic gross of $59.5 million. The film also grossed $42.9 million internationally for a worldwide total gross of $103.4 million.
