= A Kiss Before Dying =

A Kiss Before Dying may refer to:

- A Kiss Before Dying (novel), a 1953 novel by Ira Levin
- A Kiss Before Dying (1956 film), an adaptation of the novel, starring Robert Wagner and Joanne Woodward
- A Kiss Before Dying (1991 film), an adaptation of the novel, starring Matt Dillon and Sean Young
