= Steady Date with Tommy Sands =

Studio album by Tommy Sands
- Released: 1957
- Recorded: 1957
- Genre: Rock and roll, traditional pop
- Label: Capitol T848

Tommy Sands chronology
Steady Date with Tommy Sands (1957)	Sands Storm (1958)

Steady Date with Tommy Sands is the 1957 debut album by American singer Tommy Sands.

A double page advertising spread in the April 13, 1957 issue of Billboard magazine described Sands as the "Hottest singer in the nation" and Steady Date with Tommy Sands as the "Hottest album in the nation".

== Reception ==
Professional ratings
Review scores
Source	Rating
Allmusic	4.5/5 stars

The initial Billboard magazine review from April 29, 1958 commented that "Tommy Teen-Age Crush Sands stands a good chance of chalking up as strong a sales record in the album field as he already has in the singles market. His first LP spotlights a sock selection of teen-age-bait tunes...sung expertly by Sands in a variety of styles. The kids made Presley and Pat Boone best selling artists and they may very well do the same for Sands. Watch this one".

Greg Adams reviewed a 1998 reissue of the album on the Collectables label for Allmusic and wrote that the album "...omits his most enduring track, "The Worrying Kind," but otherwise presents an adequate glimpse at the music of this teen idol. The recordings range from teen-oriented novelties ("Ring My Phone") to quasi-big band vocal material. This collection is adequate and affordable for those who are curious about Sands' music..."

In his 1999 book All Roots Lead to Rock: Legends of Early Rock 'n' Roll, Colin Escott wrote that "There was nothing remotely subversive about [Steady Date with Tommy Sands] which contained ten shriveled old standards from writers who were born in the previous century".

In her 2006 book Great Pretenders: My Strange Love Affair with '50s Pop Music, Karen Schoemer wrote of listening to the album for the first time while researching her book and felt that "...the sound that came out of my stereo was unlike anything I've ever heard. It was a version of rock and roll so misshapen, so exaggerated, that it verged on the grotesque." and felt that Sands's vocal was "a hiccupy (sic) approximation of Elvis that evoked Bill Murray's lounge singer on Saturday Night Live."

== Track listing ==
1. "Goin' Steady" (Faron Young)
2. "I Don't Know Why" (Fred E. Ahlert, Roy Turk)
3. "Too Young" (Sidney Lippman, Sylvia Dee)
4. "Teach Me Tonight" (Gene de Paul, Sammy Cahn)
5. "Graduation Day" (Joel Sherman, Noel Sherman)
6. "'A' You're Adorable" (Buddy Kaye, Fred Wise, Lippman)
7. "Gonna Get a Girl" (Al Lewis, Howard Simon)
8. "Too Young to Go Steady" (Harold Adamson, Jimmy McHugh)
9. "Ring My Phone" (Frank DeHaven)
10. "I Don't Care Who Knows It" (Adamson, McHugh)
11. "Somewhere Along the Way" (Kurt Adams, Sammy Gallop)
12. "Walkin' My Baby Back Home" (Fred E. Ahlert, Roy Turk)

== Personnel ==
- Tommy Sands – vocals
