= Sing Boy Sing (soundtrack) =

Album by Tommy Sands

Soundtrack album by Tommy Sands
- Released: 1958
- Recorded: 1958
- Genre: Rock and roll, traditional pop
- Length: 51:19
- Label: Capitol T929

Tommy Sands chronology
Steady Date (1958)	Sing Boy Sing (1958)	Sands Storm (1958)

Sing Boy Sing is a 1958 album by American singer Tommy Sands. The album is the soundtrack to the film of the same name that stars Sands and Lili Gentle.

== Track listing ==
1. "I'm Gonna Walk and Talk with My Lord" (Martha Carson)
2. "Who Baby" (Bill Olofson, Jeanne Carroll)
3. "A Bundle of Dreams" (Billy Strange, Homer Escamilla)
4. "Just a Little Bit More" (Charles Singleton, Rose Marie McCoy)
5. "People In Love" (Lionel Newman, Mel Leven)
6. "Crazy 'Cause I Love You" (Spade Cooley)
7. "Your Daddy Wants to Do Right" (Tommy Sands)
8. "That's All I Want From You" (Fritz Rotter)
9. "Soda-Pop Pop" (Betty Daret, Darla Daret)
10. "Would I Love You" (Bob Russell, Harold Spina)
11. "Rock of Ages" (Augustus M. Toplady, Thomas Hastings)
12. "Sing Boy Sing" (Rod McKuen, Sands)

== Personnel ==
- Tommy Sands – vocals
- Lionel Newman – conductor
