= Sing Boy Sing (film) =

Sing, Boy, Sing
- Film poster
- Directed by: Henry Ephron
- Written by: Claude Binyon
- Based on: ”The Singin' Idol” 1957 teleplay by Paul Monash
- Produced by: Henry Ephron
- Starring: Tommy Sands; Lili Gentle; Edmond O'Brien
- Cinematography: William C. Mellor
- Edited by: William Mace
- Music by: Lionel Newman
- Production company: 20th Century Fox
- Distributed by: 20th Century Fox
- Release date: February 5, 1958
- Running time: 90 minutes
- Country: United States
- Language: English
- Budget: $860,000

Sing Boy Sing is a 1958 American musical drama film released by 20th Century-Fox and starring newcomers Tommy Sands and Lili Gentle.

The film was an expansion of the January 1957 Kraft Television Theatre episode "The Singin' Idol", also starring Sands, who was billed by the studio as a new teen idol and plays an Elvis Presley-type singer.

The film was Gentle's only starring role, and her penultimate film appearance. 20th Century-Fox had plans to promote her as its new dashing redhead, but suitable roles for her did not materialize.

Sing Boy Sing was released in the United States in February 1958 to positive reviews, but performed poorly at the box office, though it did find some popularity with teenage audiences.

Sands' soundtrack of songs from the film was released in 1958 and produced a #24 hit on the Billboard singles chart with the title song.

== Plot ==
Virgil Walker is a popular singing star. His manager Joseph Sharkey keeps tight control over Walker's life.

== Cast ==
- Tommy Sands as Virgil Walker
- Lili Gentle as Leora Easton
- Edmond O'Brien as Joseph Sharkey
- Nick Adams as C.K. Judd
- John McIntire as Rev. Farley Walker
- Diane Jergens as Pat Barry
- Josephine Hutchinson as Caroline Walker
- Jerry Paris as Arnold Fisher
- Tami Conner as Ginnie
- Regis Toomey as Rev. Easton
- Art Ford as Disc Jockey
- Bill Randle as Disc Jockey
- Biff Collie as Disc Jockey

== The Singing Idol ==
"Sing Boy Sing (film)"
- Kraft Television Theatre episode
- Episode no.: Season 10; Episode 20
- Directed by: Paul Bogart
- Written by: Paul Monash
- Original air date: January 30, 1957
- Running time: 50 mins

Guest appearances
- Fred Clark; Jane MacArthur; Tommy Sands

The film was based on the January 1957 Kraft Television Theatre episode "The Singin' Idol," which drew heavily on The Jazz Singer.

In the television program, which also stars Tommy Sands, but with the lead character's first name as Elwell rather than Virgil (as in the film), Walker is a singing star under the control of his manager. He visits his hometown where he reconnects with a childhood sweetheart. His ill father, a reverend, dies after pleading for Elwell to become a preacher, and Elwell is tempted to return home and follow in his father's footsteps, but his manager dissuades him.

The television program's script was written by Paul Monash and was based on the life of Elvis Presley. Sands had been discovered by Presley's manager Colonel Tom Parker, and Sands had toured with Presley. Parker helped Sands land lead role, which turned Sands into a star overnight. He received eight times more fan mail than any had other actor who had appeared on a Kraft Television Theatre episode. Sands later said: "Colonel Parker was the best thing that ever happened to me."

Songs performed on the show included "Hep Dee Hootie", "Rock of Ages" and "Teen-Age Crush," which reached #2 on the Billboard singles chart and sold over a million copies.

Variety wrote "a savvy script and some excellent performances in the lead roles sustained the show at a high interest."

== Production ==
20th Century-Fox had enjoyed success with films starring Elvis Presley and Pat Boone. In February 1957, the studio bought the film rights, and in July Sands signed on to appear in the film. Henry Ephron was assigned to produce.

Ephron said that Claude Binyon had written "a first-rate script" that "could be made at a price." He approached Orson Welles about the part of the manager. Welles was enthusiastic and also wanted to direct the film. He explained his ideas to Ephron, who thought that they were "electric," and pitched the idea of Welles directing to the executives at Fox. Spyros Skouras said that Ephron could have Welles if he personally guaranteed any cost overruns that Welles might incur. However, Ephron directed the film himself.

Filming began in September 1957. Sands' costar was Lili Gentle, a Fox contract player who had appeared in Will Success Spoil Rock Hunter?.

Sands cowrote some of the film's musical numbers.

== Reception ==
20th Century-Fox head Buddy Adler was reportedly so excited by a preview of the film that he signed a new contract with Sands, tripling his salary.

The film opened at the Metropolitan Theatre in Houston, Texas on February 5, 1958, but was pulled two days later because of poor attendance. The film was a box office failure.

=== Critical ===
The Los Angeles Times wrote that the film was "several cuts above average" and that the "real surprise package" was Sands: "[H]e's going to be a very competent actor; he already has verve, presence."

Variety felt Sands "registers as a potent new film personality who will, with proper material, become a boxoffice lure. Unfortunately, the vehicle chosen for his bow can register only moderately since-the adaptation of the tv show that first catapulted him to stardom emerges as satisfactory fare for an adult video audience but not for teenage theatregoers."
