= A Kiss Before Dying (novel) =

1953 novel written by Ira Levin

- First edition
- Author: Ira Levin
- Original title: Kiss Before Dying
- Language: English
- Publisher: Simon & Schuster
- Publication date: June 1953
- Publication place: United States
- Media type: Hardcover & Paperback
- Pages: 244 pages

A Kiss Before Dying is a 1953 novel written by Ira Levin. It won the 1954 Edgar Award for Best First Novel.

The book has been adapted twice for the cinema: first in 1956 and later in 1991.

Now a modern crime classic, Levin's story centers on a charming, intelligent man who will stop at nothing, even murder, to get where he wants to go. His problem is a pregnant woman who loves him. The solution involves desperate measures.

== Plot ==
Burton “Bud” Corliss is a young man with a ruthless drive to rise above his working-class origins to a life of wealth and importance. He serves in the Pacific in World War II, and upon his honorable discharge in 1947 he learns that his father was killed in an automobile accident while he was overseas.

The most pivotal moment in his life occurs during the war, when he first wounds, then kills, a Japanese sniper, who is so terrified that he wets his pants and begs for mercy. Corliss is elated by the total power he holds over the soldier; at the same time, he is disgusted by the man's display of abject terror.

Upon returning to the U.S., he enrolls in college and meets Dorothy Kingship, the daughter of a wealthy copper tycoon. Seeing an opportunity to attain the riches he has always craved, he becomes Dorothy's lover. When she tells him she is pregnant, however, he panics; he is sure that her stern, conservative father will disinherit her. Resolving to get rid of Dorothy, he tricks her into writing a letter that, to an unknowing observer, would look like a suicide note, and then throws her from the roof of a tall building. He runs no risk of getting caught, having urged Dorothy to keep their relationship a secret from her family and friends. He continues to live with his mother, who dotes on him and has no clue as to what he has done.

Corliss lies low for a few months until the press coverage of Dorothy's death has subsided. Then he pursues Dorothy's sister, Ellen, who does not know he was Dorothy's boyfriend. The romance is going according to plan until Ellen begins to probe into Dorothy's death, convinced her sister did not kill herself. Eventually, Ellen uncovers the truth about Corliss and confronts him. Corliss nonchalantly confesses to the crime and kills Ellen as well.

Unfazed by this setback, Corliss courts the last remaining Kingship daughter, Marion. This affair is the most successful; Corliss sweeps her off her feet and charms her father, and soon he and Marion are engaged.

Local college DJ Gordon Gant, who met Ellen during her investigation of Dorothy's death, begins investigating the case, and is immediately suspicious of Corliss. He breaks into Corliss' childhood home and steals a written plan for meeting and seducing Marion to get her family's money. Days before the wedding, he shows up at the Kingship family home and presents Marion and her father with the evidence of Corliss' deception.

Marion, her father, and Gant all corner Corliss during a visit to one of the Kingship family's copper manufacturing plants, threatening to push him into a vat of molten copper unless he confesses his crimes. When they refuse to believe his protestations of innocence, Corliss panics and wets his pants – just as the Japanese soldier, his symbol of pathetic cowardice, had done. He begins to confess, then, delirious with fear and shame, falls to his death in the vat below. The accusers, whose threat was only a bluff, return home in shock. They face the prospect of explaining the incident to Corliss' mother.

== Characters ==
- Burton "Bud" Corliss
- Dorothy Kingship
- Mrs. Corliss
- Ellen Kingship
- Marion Kingship
- Gordon Gant
- Leo Kingship
- Dwight Powell

== Adaptations ==
The novel has been adapted twice into Hollywood films. The first, A Kiss Before Dying, was a 1956 film starring Robert Wagner as Bud Corliss, Virginia Leith as Ellen Kingship, Joanne Woodward as Dorothy ('Dorie') Kingship, and Mary Astor as Mrs. Corliss. The film was directed by Gerd Oswald and, except for eliminating the third sister, Marion, he followed the novel's plot fairly closely.

The second adaptation, A Kiss Before Dying, was a 1991 film, and drastically changed the story. It was filmed as a neo-noir starring Matt Dillon as Jonathan Corliss, Sean Young as twins Ellen and Dorothy Carlsson, Diane Ladd as Mrs. Corliss, and Max von Sydow as Thor Carlsson. The movie was adapted and directed by James Dearden.

It was also an episode in the BBC 2 television series Story Parade. The script was co-written by Terry Nation.

The Indian Hindi film Baazigar seems to be loosely inspired by the 1991 Hollywood remake rather than the original novel. Substantial changes were made to the protagonist, Ajay Sharma. In the film, Sharma's family is ruined at the hands of his father's employee, Madan Chopra. Thus, Sharma wishes to exact revenge by stealing Chopra's company from him by wooing his two daughters. In this fashion, Sharma is more of an anti-hero than a pure villain, and the aspect of vengeance dominates much of the film.

A Malayalam movie named Moonnilonnu released in 1997 was also based on this novel.

== Critical reception ==
Horror author Stephen King called Levin’s first novel “a gritty suspense story told with great élan.” He describes the novel as unique in the sense that a key element of the story—a revelation about who committed a particular murder—takes the reader by complete surprise. In King’s words:

"[The novel’s] real screeching bombshell is neatly tucked away about one hundred pages into the story. If you should happen upon this moment while thumbing randomly through the book, it means nothing to you. If you have read everything faithfully up to that point, it means ... everything. The only other writer I can think of offhand who had that wonderful ability to totally ambush the reader was the late Cornell Woolrich ... but Woolrich did not have Levin's dry wit.”
