= Virginia Leith =

American actress (1925–2019)

- Leith in 1959
- Born: October 15, 1925; Cleveland, Ohio, U.S.
- Died: November 4, 2019 (aged 94); Palm Springs, California, U.S.
- Occupation: Actress
- Years active: 1953–1962; 1977–1981
- Spouse: Don Harron (m. 1960; div. 1968)

Virginia Leith (October 15, 1925 – November 4, 2019) was an American film and television actress.

== Career ==
Leith in The Millionaire, 1959

Leith starred in a few films, with her most productive period coming in the 1950s. Her debut was also the first film directed by Stanley Kubrick, a self-financed art house film, Fear and Desire (1953). She signed a contract with 20th Century-Fox in 1954 and had leading roles in films such as Violent Saturday (1955), Toward the Unknown, On the Threshold of Space, and opposite Robert Wagner and Joanne Woodward in the crime drama A Kiss Before Dying (all 1956). Her most recognizable role may have been that of a decapitated woman whose head is kept alive in The Brain That Wouldn't Die (1962, shot 1959).

She left acting after her 1960 marriage to actor Donald Harron. Following her divorce from Harron, in the 1970s Leith resumed to her career and appeared mainly in television shows, including Starsky and Hutch, Barnaby Jones, The White Shadow and Baretta. She left the screen again in the early 1980s.

== Personal life ==
She was involved with actor Jeffrey Hunter during his divorce in 1955. She dated actor Marlon Brando in 1956.

Leith died on November 4, 2019, at the age of 94.

== Filmography ==
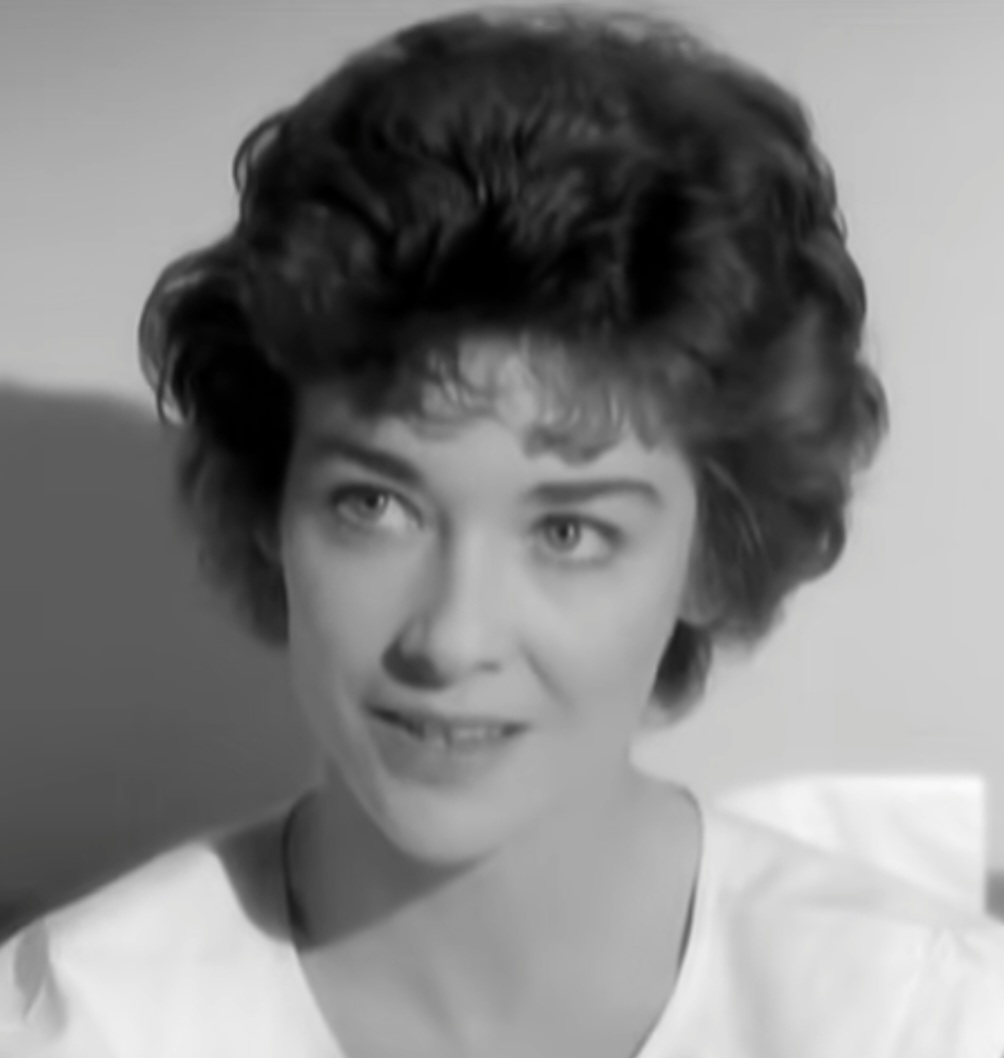
Virginia Leith in an episode of One Step Beyond (1959)

Year	Title	Role	Notes
1953	Fear and Desire	Young Girl	
1953	Here Come the Girls	Chorus Girl	Uncredited
1954	Black Widow	Claire Amberly	
1955	White Feather	Ann Magruder	
1955	Violent Saturday	Linda Sherman	
1956	On the Threshold of Space	Pat Lange	
1956	A Kiss Before Dying	Ellen Kingship	
1956	Toward the Unknown	Connie Mitchell	
1956	The 20th Century-Fox Hour	Irene Bennett	Episode: "The Last Patriarch"
1958	Sing, Boy, Sing	Stewardess	Uncredited
1958	Jane Wyman Presents the Fireside Theatre	Barbara	Episode: "The Bravado Touch"
1958	The Millionaire	Lil Harrigan	Episode: "The Frank Harrigan Story"
1959	Alcoa Presents: One Step Beyond	Sally Conroy	Episode: "The Bride Possessed"
1959	The Brain That Wouldn't Die	Jan Compton	Theatrically released in 1962
1961	Great Ghost Tales		Episode: "August Heat"
1977	Baretta	Sally Locker	Episode: "Guns and Brothers"
1977	Starsky & Hutch	Margaret Blaine	Episode: "Death in a Different Place"
1977	First Love	Mrs. March	Uncredited
1978	The White Shadow	Art teacher	Episode: "Mainstream"
