= Love in a Goldfish Bowl =

1961 American film written and directed by Jack Sher

- Directed by: Jack Sher
- Written by: Jack Sher
- Based on: a story by Irene Kamp; Jack Sher
- Produced by: Richard Shepherd; Martin Jurow
- Starring: Tommy Sands; Fabian; Toby Michaels
- Cinematography: Loyal Griggs
- Edited by: Terry Morse
- Music by: Jimmie Haskell
- Production company: Jurow-Shepherd Productions
- Distributed by: Paramount Pictures
- Release date: June 1961
- Running time: 88 minutes
- Country: United States
- Language: English

Love in a Goldfish Bowl is a 1961 teen film directed by Jack Sher starring singing idols Tommy Sands and Fabian.

== Plot ==
Gordon Slide and Blythe Holloway are two platonic best friends at a college, both from single-parent families. They are so devoted to each other that the headmaster of the school is considering banning them from seeing each other.

Gordon then decides to spend the Easter holiday at his mother's beach pad. Blythe accompanies him, with Gordon impersonating the college headmaster on the phone to Blythe's senator father, so that Blythe gets permission.

Gordon and Blythe settle into a domestic routine. One day they take Gordon's yacht out and get caught in a storm, and the Coast Guard have to rescue them. One of the Coast Guard, Giuseppe, falls for Blythe, which provokes feelings of jealousy in Gordon.

Matters come to a head when Gordon and Blythe have a party. Giuseppe brings along a "fast" girl to set up with Gordon so he can be with Blythe. However this causes Blythe to be jealous. When Giuseppe makes a move on Blythe, she resists. Then another man, a drunken sailor, tries to molest Blythe, but Gordon rescues her.

Gordon and Blythe kiss – only to be busted by his socialite mother and Blythe's father. Everyone has a talk and Gordon's mother and Blythe's father realise how much they have been neglecting their children; they vow to do better. Blythe tells an apologetic Giuseppe that she will continue to write to him.

Blythe and Gordon return to college, now a couple, although the old routines of their relationship are still in play.

== Cast ==
- Tommy Sands as Gordon Slide
- Fabian as Giuseppe La Barba
- Toby Michaels as Blythe Holloway
- Jan Sterling as Sandra Slide
- Edward Andrews as Clyde Holloway
- John McGiver as Dr. Frowley
- Majel Barrett as Alice
- Shirley O'Hara as Clara Dumont
- Robert Patten as Lieut. J. G. Marchon
- Phillip Baird as Gregory
- Elizabeth MacRae as Jackie
- Denny Miller as Oscar Flegler
- Susan Silo as Jenny
- "Tiger"

== Production ==
The film was originally known as Beach Pad. It was based on an original script by Jack Sher and his cousin Louis Kamp's wife, Irene Kamp, who had worked on Paris Blues together; they sold it to Martin Jurow and Richard Shepherd, the producers of Breakfast at Tiffany's, who had a deal at Paramount.

Shooting started in November 1960 and took place in Hollywood and on location in Balboa.

Fabian and Tommy Sands were both pop stars at the time and both sing in the film. Sands' hair was dyed blonde to differentiate him from Fabian. Sands later said this was "a big mistake. It looked so phony. Fans who knew me knew that was phony."

=== Songs ===
- "Love in a Goldfish Bowl" by Burt Bacharach and Hal David sung by Tommy Sands (a Capitol Records Release)
- "You're Only Young Once" by Russell Faith, Robert Marcucci and Peter De Angelis sung by Fabian (A Chancellor Records Artist)

== Reception ==
The New York Times called the film "vapid and transparent" but that at least it "made no pretenses". Variety called it "strictly teenage fare that misses the mark frequently but has several values that might attract the interest of young people."

Producer Martin Jurow later said the film "didn't come off very well."

According to a review of the film in Diabolique magazine:

It's very possible to do a gay reading of this film, with Sands displaying zero sexual interest in Michaels or any woman throughout the film. Or maybe that's too limiting: because when Fabian puts the hard word on Michaels, she is very coy and not keen at all, despite flirting heavily with him until then. So maybe it's more accurate to describe this movie as being about two people with low sex drives who find each other.

A novelisation of the script was issued in 1961.

== Bibliography ==
- Maltin, Leonard (2015). Turner Classic Movies Presents Leonard Maltin's Classic Movie Guide: From the Silent Era Through 1965 (3rd ed.). New York City: Plume. p. 408. ISBN 978-0147516824.
- Lisanti, Tom (2005). Hollywood Surf and Beach Movies: The First Wave, 1959–1969 (1st ed.). New York City: McFarland & Company. p. 10. ISBN 978-0786421046.
- Aaker, Everett (2017). Television Western Players, 1960–1975: A Biographical Dictionary. New York City: McFarland & Company. p. 1988. ISBN 978-1476662503.
