= Sands at the Sands =

Live album by Tommy Sands
- Released: 1960
- Recorded: 1960
- Venue: Sands Hotel and Casino, Las Vegas
- Genre: Traditional pop
- Label: Capitol T1364
- Producer: Ken Nelson

Tommy Sands chronology
When I'm Thinking of You (1959)	Sands at the Sands (1960)	Dream with Me (1960)

Sands at the Sands is a 1960 live album by American singer Tommy Sands recorded at the Sands Hotel and Casino in Las Vegas.

== Reception ==
Professional ratings
Review scores
Source	Rating
Allmusic	4.5/5 stars

The initial Billboard magazine review from May 30, 1960 commented that "[Sands] showcases his hits and proves that his talent will shine for a long time to come".

== Track listing ==
1. "This Could Be the Start of Something" (Steve Allen) – 3:31
2. "In the Still of the Night" (Cole Porter) – 3:31
3. "Night and Day" (Porter) – 0:17
4. "What Is This Thing Called Love?" (Porter) – 1:23
5. Medley: "I Get Along Without You Very Well"/"How Did She Look?" (Hoagy Carmichael)/(Abner Silver, Gladys Shelley) – 4:06
6. "I Wanna Be Bad" (Fred Ebb, Paul Klein) – 5:20
7. "I Got Plenty o' Nuttin'" (DuBose Heyward, George Gershwin, Ira Gershwin) – 2:59
8. "Hello, Young Lovers" (Richard Rodgers, Oscar Hammerstein II) – 0:15
9. "Everything's Coming Up Roses" (Jule Styne, Stephen Sondheim) – 1:54
10. "Get Happy" (Harold Arlen, Ted Koehler) – 1:38
11. "It's a Good Day" (Dave Barbour, Peggy Lee) – 0:38
12. "(I'm) All Shook Up"/"Short Shorts"/"Splish Splash"/"Hound Dog" (Bill Bellman, Hal Blaine)/(Bob Gaudio, Tom Austin, Billy Dalton, Billy Crandall)(Bobby Darin, Murray Kaufman)/(Jerry Leiber, Mike Stoller) – 4:59
13. "Unchained Melody" (Alex North, Hy Zaret) – 3:38
14. "Sinner Man" (Les Baxter, Will Holt) – 3:55
15. "Hello, Young Lovers" – 0:15

== Personnel ==
- Tommy Sands – vocals
- Ken Nelson – producer
