= Young and Dangerous (1957 film) =

1957 film by William F. Claxton

- Theatrical release poster
- Directed by: William F. Claxton
- Screenplay by: James Landis
- Produced by: William F. Claxton
- Starring: Lili Gentle; Mark Damon; Edward Binns; Frances Mercer; George Brenlin; Connie Stevens
- Cinematography: John M. Nickolaus, Jr.
- Edited by: Frank Baldridge
- Music by: Paul Dunlap
- Production company: Regal Films Inc
- Distributed by: 20th Century Fox
- Release date: October 30, 1957
- Running time: 78 minutes
- Country: United States
- Language: English

Young and Dangerous is a 1957 American drama film directed by William F. Claxton and written by James Landis. The film stars Lili Gentle, Mark Damon, Edward Binns, Frances Mercer, George Brenlin and Connie Stevens. The film was released on October 30, 1957, by 20th Century Fox.

== Plot ==
Rosemary Clinton's parents are displeased by her interest in a boy, Tommy Price, who, although a doctor's son, has a reputation as a juvenile delinquent.

Making a bet with his friends that Rosemary will grant him her favors, Tommy chases her under a pier and is arrested by police. His disappointed parents must bail Tommy out of jail, while the Clintons forbid their daughter from seeing the boy again.

Rosemary and Tommy date without their parents knowing it. She appeals to his better nature, persuading Tommy to go to college and perhaps become a doctor like his dad. But after a bully called Rock picks a fight with him, Tommy ends up bloodied. Then he and Rosemary are caught together by her father, who slaps her. Rosemary runs away, but Tommy convinces her that no one can keep them apart.

== Cast ==
- Lili Gentle as Rosemary Clinton
- Mark Damon as Tommy Price
- Edward Binns as Dr. Price
- Frances Mercer as Mrs. Price
- George Brenlin as Weasel Martin
- Connie Stevens as Candy
- Jered Barclay as Stretch Grass
- Danny Welton as Bones
- William Stevens as Rock
- Joan Bradshaw as Carhop
- Dabbs Greer as Mr. John Clinton
- Shirley Falls as Rock's girl
- Ann Doran as Mrs. Clara Clinton
- Kim Scala as Party girl

== Release ==
The film was released on a double bill with Rockabilly Baby also directed by Claxton.
