= On the Threshold of Space =

1956 film by Robert D. Webb

- Theatrical release poster
- Directed by: Robert D. Webb
- Written by: Shimon Wincelberg; Francis M. Cockrell
- Produced by: William Bloom
- Starring: Guy Madison; Virginia Leith; John Hodiak
- Cinematography: Joseph MacDonald
- Edited by: Hugh S. Fowler
- Music by: Lyn Murray
- Production company: Twentieth Century-Fox Film Corporation
- Distributed by: Twentieth Century-Fox Film Corp.
- Release date: March 29, 1956
- Running time: 98 minutes
- Country: United States
- Language: English
- Budget: $1,505,000
- Box office: $1.15 million (US rentals)

On the Threshold of Space (aka Threshold of Space) is a 1956 drama directed by Robert D. Webb, starring Guy Madison, Virginia Leith and John Hodiak. It was Hodiak's final film; he died six months before it was released. On the Threshold of Space provides a historical depiction of air force tests made in the United States for the imminent space race.

== Plot ==
Capt. Jim Hollenbeck (Guy Madison), a dedicated physician assigned to the space branch of the United States Air Force Medical Corps, voluntarily undergoes jump school training. He wants to better analyze the effect of parachute jumps on the human body. After jump school, Lt. Col. Masters (Walter Coy), the head of the space program, sends Jim to Sovern Air Force Base in Florida to evaluate a problematic experimental ejection seat.

While ejecting from his aircraft, test pilot Mike Bentley (Warren Stevens) broke his shoulder. Jim is assigned to determine what happened. In a test, when his arm is also broken, Jim determines that the wind blast during ejection forced his arm off the ejection release.

Once the seat mechanism is modified, a series of tests at supersonic speeds are begun with rocket sleds launched at 1,000 miles per hour (1,600 km/h). Dr. Hugh Thornton (Dean Jagger), head of the program and Jim's mentor, wants Jim to test the first balloon gondola designed to carry a man 20 miles (32 km) up into the "threshold of space," the first step toward putting a man into space.

Before accepting the assignment, Jim asks his fiancée, Pat Lange (Virginia Leith), for her blessing and the couple marry but their honeymoon is cut short by the news that Col. Masters was killed in an automobile accident. Jim rushes back to the base, where Maj. Ward Thomas (John Hodiak) is the new head of the program. Thomas is more cautious and cancels Jim's high altitude balloon flight. Jim is instructed to take Lt. Morton Glenn (Martin Milner) to a height of 55,000 feet (17,000 m), then lower the gondola to 10,000 feet (3,000 m), where Glenn will parachute to earth.

The test goes badly with Glenn freezing and Jim completing the jump but is reprimanded. Meanwhile, tests proceed on the rocket sleds with crash dummies. After a dummy is decapitated, Thomas plans to test the sled himself and has assigned Jim to act as physician for the trial. At 1,000 miles per hour (1,600 km/h), the major is temporarily blinded, but soon regains his sight, and the test is proclaimed a success.

When Washington authorizes a floating high-altitude platform, Jim is assigned to the first high altitude balloon flight. Reaching 100,000 feet (30,000 m), his radio fails, and when he drifts over a rugged mountain range, Jim discovers that his oxygen is nearly gone, forcing him to land. While descending, his matter-of-fact reports to his supervisors relay what is happening to his body. After the gondola crashes in the mountains, a helicopter locates the balloon and finds Jim alive, but dazed.

== Cast ==
- Guy Madison as Capt. Jim Hollenbeck
- Virginia Leith as Pat Lange aka Mrs. Hollenbeck
- John Hodiak as Maj. Ward Thomas (Note: Hodiak died unexpectedly at age 41 just prior to completion of the film.)
- Dean Jagger as Dr. Hugh Thornton
- Warren Stevens as Capt. Mike Bentley
- Martin Milner as Lt. Morton Glenn
- King Calder as Lee Welch
- Walter Coy as Lt. Col. Richard "Dick" Masters
- Ken Clark as Sgt. Ike Forbes
- Donald Murphy as Sgt. Zack Deming
- Barry Coe as Communications Officer
- Dan C. Ogle as himself - Prologue (as Major General Dan C. Ogle)

== Production ==
On the Threshold of Space documents the testing of downward firing ejection seats from Boeing B-47 Stratojet bombers that were conducted at Eglin AFB, Florida, initially between October 7 and October 21, 1953. Nine tests were conducted of the seat from a B-47 over Eglin's water ranges over the Gulf of Mexico, by the Air Proving Ground, at an altitude of 10,000 feet and various speeds. A second series of tests was also conducted beginning July 8, 1954 after refinements to the system. These tests were recreated in the film, shot at Eglin in 1955, with a different Stratojet from the one in the actual missions.

"Actually, we feel that the star of the movie will be the Air Force and the progress it is making in the aero medical field," said Robert Webb, director, in commenting on the film.

"It will deal with [the] Air Force's work in the aero medical field and will include actual shots of experimentations with the Air Force sled being made under direction of Lt. Col. John Paul Stapp, Air Force surgeon, who appeared on the cover of the Sept. 12 [1955] issue of 'Time' magazine."

=== Shooting ===
On the Threshold of Space was filmed in part at the Air Proving Grounds Command, Eglin AFB, Florida, the Shoreline Hotel in Fort Walton Beach, Florida, and at Holloman AFB, New Mexico.

Filming in Florida took place in mid-September 1955. "A crew consisting of 79 members including technicians and cast, of 20th Century Fox Film Corporation" shot in the Eglin / Fort Walton Beach area for about seven days, starting on September 15. Some Eglin personnel were used in shooting regional scenes. Production then moved to New Mexico.

John Hodiak died of a heart attack during the shoot just before he was to film his final scenes.

== Reception ==
The film premiered at Holloman Air Force Base.

=== Critical ===
On the Threshold of Space was reviewed in The New York Times. A. M. Weiler noted: "Colorful proof that science can be stranger and more interesting than science-fiction is presented in 'On the Threshold of Space,' which landed at the Globe yesterday."

The Los Angeles Times called it "impressive".
