= Baazigar =

1993 Indian film by Abbas–Mustan

- Theatrical release poster
- Directed by: Abbas–Mustan
- Written by: Robin Bhatt; Akash Khurana; Javed Siddiqui
- Produced by: Ganesh Jain; Champak Jain
- Starring: Shah Rukh Khan; Kajol; Shilpa Shetty; Dalip Tahil; Raakhee
- Cinematography: Thomas A. Xavier
- Edited by: Hussain A. Burmawala
- Music by: Songs: Anu Malik; Score: Shyam Surender
- Production company: Venus Movies
- Distributed by: Eros International
- Release date: 12 November 1993
- Running time: 182 minutes
- Country: India
- Language: Hindi
- Budget: ₹3 crore
- Box office: est.₹32 crore

Baazigar (transl. Gambler) is a 1993 Indian Hindi-language neo-noir romantic thriller film directed by Abbas–Mustan and produced by Venus Movies. It stars Shah Rukh Khan, Kajol, Shilpa Shetty (in her acting debut), Dalip Tahil, and Raakhee. The film follows a young man seeking to avenge the fall of his family by going on a murderous rampage. It is loosely based on the films A Kiss Before Dying (1956) and A Kiss Before Dying (1991), which in turn are based on Ira Levin's novel of the same (1953). The soundtrack was composed by Anu Malik.

Baazigar was released on 12 November 1993, coinciding with Diwali. The film was major commercial success, grossing ₹150 million worldwide, to rank as the fourth highest-grossing Hindi film of the year. Additionally, the film has earned cult status over the years due to its suspense, story, screenplay, soundtrack and performances of the cast. It proved to be Khan's breakthrough role as a sole lead, and the first of many collaborations between Khan and Kajol.

At the 39th Filmfare Awards, Baazigar received 10 nominations, including Best Film, Best Supporting Actress and Best Female Debut (both for Shetty), and won 4 awards, including Best Actor (Khan) and Best Music Director (Malik).

== Plot ==
Madan Chopra, a wealthy businessman, has two daughters, Seema and Priya. During a car race in Madras, Chopra meets Vicky Malhotra, a seemingly charming young man who allows him to win the race to earn his trust. Chopra becomes impressed by Vicky, and Priya gradually falls in love with him. However, Vicky is revealed to be Ajay Sharma, who has assumed a false identity to take revenge on Chopra.

Seema, who is in a secret relationship with Ajay, faces pressure from her father to marry someone else. Ajay tricks her into writing a suicide note and later pushes her off a building, staging her death as a suicide. To avoid a scandal, Chopra quickly closes the case. Suspicious of her sister’s death, Priya begins investigating with the help of Inspector Karan Saxena, an old college friend.

Her investigation leads to Seema’s friend Ravi who tells Priya that he took a photograph of Seema and Ajay together at a party. Before Priya can see it, Ajay intervenes and forces Ravi to write a suicide note, framing him as Seema's murderer and kills him by hanging him while staging his death as a suicide. Meanwhile, Chopra plans Priya’s engagement to Vicky, still unaware of his true identity.

Through flashbacks, it is revealed that Chopra once worked for Ajay’s father, Vishwanath Sharma. When Sharma caught him embezzling company funds, Chopra was jailed. Upon his release, Chopra pretended to repent but betrayed Sharma when he gave Madan power of attorney, taking over his business and leaving the Sharma family destitute. This led to Sharma’s death from a heart attack, the death of Ajay’s baby sister, and his mother Shobna’s mental breakdown. Witnessing Chopra's cruelty, Ajay vowed to destroy him and only goal in life was to see the destruction of Chopra.

During Priya and Vicky’s engagement, Seema’s college friend Anjali calls the house and Ajay answers the phone. She mentions having seen Seema with a man who resembles Ajay at her birthday party and possessing a photograph of them together, alarming him. Realizing that she could expose his true identity, Ajay visits the hotel where Anjali works. He kills her and eats the photo while concealing her body in a suitcase, which he later disposes of in a river. The next day, Inspector Karan informs Priya that Anjali has gone missing and asks whether any phone call was received from her that day, planting the first seeds of Priya’s suspicion toward Ajay.

Back in the present, Priya meets the real Vicky Malhotra and begins to suspect Ajay. She discovers a locket with photos of Ajay and Seema, confirming her suspicions and confronts Ajay who reveals Chopra's theft of his family's wealth to a shocked Priya who feels sympathy for him despite his crimes. Chopra, becomes aware of Ajay’s identity after giving him power of attorney which Ajay uses to steal his company. Chopra confronts him at his home with goons. A brutal fight ensues, during which Chopra's goons badly beat Ajay and Madan hits Shobha, who regains her sanity upon hearing Madan's voice. In the end, Ajay fights back but Chopra fatally impales Ajay with a rod, but Ajay retaliates, fatally wounding Chopra who dies immediately. A wounded Ajay struggles back to his mother, promising her he has reclaimed everything that was meant to be their's. Now only wanting to rest peacefully in his mothers arms, a despondent Priya and Karan watch as Ajay dies in his mothers arms, finally at peace.

== Cast ==
- Shah Rukh Khan as Ajay Sharma (real) / Vicky Malhotra (impostor)
  - Sumeet Pathak as young Ajay
- Kajol as Priya Chopra, Seema's younger sister
- Shilpa Shetty as Seema Chopra, Priya's elder sister
- Dalip Tahil as Madan Chopra, Priya and Seema's father
- Raakhee Gulzar as Shobha Sharma, Ajay's mother (special appearance)
- Siddharth Ray as Inspector Karan Saxena
- Johnny Lever as Babulal
- Anant Mahadevan as Vishwanath Sharma, Ajay's father.
- Daboo Malik as Ravi Shukla
- Dinesh Hingoo as Bajoria Seth
- Adi Irani as the real Vicky Malhotra
- Kiku Sharda as Rocco
- Resham Tipnis as Anjali Sinha, Seema's friend
- Amrut Patel as Seema's driver
- Prithvi Zutshi as Suresh Desai
- Manmauji as Taalia
- Sharad Sankla as Charlie
- Raju Srivastav as Charlie's friend
- Harpal Singh as Cook Motu
- Anu Malik as himself, the musician and host at the engagement (special appearance)
- Vinod Rathod as himself, the singer at the engagement (special appearance)

== Production ==
=== Development ===
The film's premise is a subversion of a concept loosely inspired by a Hollywood film, A Kiss Before Dying (1991), which itself was based on a novel of the same name. While it borrows the basic premise, Baazigar tells a different, subversive story. While Matt Dillon's character in A Kiss Before Dying is a villain who murders for money, Baazigar subverts this, with Shah Rukh Khan's character instead being a sympathetic anti-hero seeking vengeance for the brutal injustices done to his family.

In the first draft of Baazigar, Khan's character was conceived as an out-and-out negative character with a desire to become rich, stemming from a tramautic childhood involving an abusive alcoholic father. He manipulates his way into relationships with the daughters of a wealthy businessman, ultimately killing one of them to gain control over the family fortune. The second daughter would discover his intentions and kill him, bringing the story full circle with her act of justice. However, the script was later reworked with an emotional backstory given to Khan's character, to make it resonate more with audiences.

Deepak Tijori once shared in an interview that after watching A Kiss Before Dying, he was keen to star in its Hindi adaptation. He introduced the film to the director duo Abbas–Mustan and later to producer Pahlaj Nihalani. Both parties liked the concept and were initially open to making the film with Tijori in the lead.

However, after discussions with Nihalani, Abbas–Mustan decided they preferred Shah Rukh Khan for the lead role and already had other producers on board. They assured Tijori that they would collaborate with him on a different project soon, but that never happened, and he ultimately lost the role.

=== Casting ===
Several actors were considered for the lead role but declined due to the character’s morally ambiguous and antiheroic nature. Akshay Kumar was initially approached but refused the role, reportedly due to its negative portrayal. Arbaaz Khan also declined for similar reasons, although he later portrayed an antagonistic character in Abbas–Mustan's Daraar (1996). Other actors, including Salman Khan and Anil Kapoor, were approached but chose not to accept the role. Shah Rukh Khan subsequently expressed strong interest in the role and convinced producers Ratan Jain and Ganesh Jain of his suitability. Despite initial skepticism from some industry observers regarding his image, he was ultimately cast in the role.

Initially, Sridevi was considered for a dual role as twin sisters, similar to Sean Young in the original film. However, the director later concluded that her widespread popularity might hinder audience sympathy for the protagonist if her character were killed, leading to the decision to cast two different actresses instead. Madhuri Dixit was subsequently offered the role of Seema but declined. Juhi Chawla was later approached for the same role, but also turned it down as she found the role too small. Ayesha Jhulka was offered the role of Priya, but declined. Madhoo and Farheen were also considered the role of Seema, but both declined.

=== Filming ===
Principal photography began in December 1992 and concluded in June 1993. Initially, two endings of the film were shot: the first where Ajay was killed by Priya after she discovers his true intentions and second where his character was arrested by the police.

== Music ==
The music was composed by Anu Malik, with lyrics written by Dev Kohli, Nawab Arzoo, Zafar Gorakhpuri, Rani Malik, Zameer Kazmi, and Gauhar Kanpuri. The vocals were provided by Kumar Sanu, Alka Yagnik, Anu Malik, Asha Bhosle, Vinod Rathod, and Pankaj Udhas. The song "Yeh Kaali Kaali Aakhein" earned Sanu his fourth consecutive Filmfare Award for Best Male Playback Singer. Dr. Alban's song "It's My Life" also featured in the film. The soundtrack was released by Venus Music.

Nadeem–Shravan had been signed to compose the music of the film, however the duo demanded that Kajol be dropped from the film owing to personal conflicts with Kajol and her mother Tanuja. Abbas–Mustan refused as she had already been cast, leading to the duo opting out the film.

A soundtrack was also released in Marathi. The album sold 10 million units, making it one of the best-selling Bollywood soundtrack albums of all time and becoming the fifth best-selling soundtrack album of 1993. The soundtrack was ranked #67 on the list of "100 Greatest Bollywood Soundtracks of All Time", as compiled by Planet Bollywood.

Baazigar

Soundtrack album by Anu Malik
- Released: 2 April 1993
- Genre: Film soundtrack
- Label: Venus Music
- Producer: Anu Malik

Anu Malik chronology
Phool Aur Angaar (1993)	Baazigar (1993)	The Gentleman (1994)

=== Track listing ===
No.	Title	Lyrics	Singer(s)	Length
1.	"Baazigar O Baazigar"	Nawab Arzoo	Kumar Sanu, Alka Yagnik	7:31
2.	"Yeh Kaali Kaali Aankhein"	Dev Kohli	Kumar Sanu, Anu Malik	7:53
3.	"Kitabein Bahut Si"	Zafar Gorakhpuri	Asha Bhosle, Vinod Rathod	6:28
4.	"Chhupana Bhi Nahi Aata"	Rani Malik	Vinod Rathod	7:01
5.	"Chhupana Bhi Nahi Aata"	Rani Malik	Pankaj Udhas	5:31
6.	"Samajh Kar Chand Jis Ko (Not in film)"	Zameer Kazmi	Vinod Rathod, Alka Yagnik	8:53
7.	"Aye Mere Humsafar"	Gauhar Kanpuri	Vinod Rathod, Alka Yagnik	7:29
8.	"Tere Chehre Pe (Not in film)"	Rani Malik	Kumar Sanu, Sonali Vajpai	7:09
Total length:				57:51

== Box office ==
Baazigar emerged a major commercial success with Blockbuster verdict at the box-office, ranking as the fourth highest-grossing Hindi film of the year, behind another Shah Rukh Khan-starrer, Darr. Baazigar's collections in India were ₹15 crore net and ₹32 crore gross, equivalent to ₹571 crore (US$59 million) adjusted for inflation (in 2018).

== Accolades ==
Award	Category	Recipients and nominees	Results
39th Filmfare Awards	Best Actor	Shah Rukh Khan	Won
39th Filmfare Awards	Best Music Director	Anu Malik	Won
39th Filmfare Awards	Best Male Playback Singer	Kumar Sanu for "Yeh Kaali Kaali Aankhein"	Won
39th Filmfare Awards	Best Screenplay	Robin Bhatt, Javed Siddiqui, Akash Khurana	Won
39th Filmfare Awards	Best Supporting Actress	Shilpa Shetty	Nominated
39th Filmfare Awards	Best Female Debut	Shilpa Shetty	Nominated
39th Filmfare Awards	Best Film	Ganesh Jain and Champak Jain	Nominated
39th Filmfare Awards	Best Comedian	Johnny Lever	Nominated
39th Filmfare Awards	Best Lyricist	Dev Kohli for "Yeh Kaali Kaali Aankhein"	Nominated
39th Filmfare Awards	Best Male Playback Singer	Kumar Sanu for "Baazigar, O Baazigar"	Nominated
39th Filmfare Awards	Best Female Playback Singer	Alka Yagnik for "Baazigar, O Baazigar"	Nominated

== Remakes ==
A Telugu remake, Vetagadu, released in 1995, followed by a Tamil remake, Samrat, which released in 1997 and a Kannada remake, Nagarahavu, which released in 2002. The Bengali remake, Prem was released in 2007.
