= This Thing Called Love (album) =

Studio album by Tommy Sands
- Released: 1959
- Recorded: 1959
- Genre: Traditional pop
- Label: Capitol T1123

Tommy Sands chronology
Sands Storm (1958)	This Thing Called Love (1959)	When I'm Thinking of You (1959)

This Thing Called Love is a 1959 album by American singer Tommy Sands, arranged by Bob Bain.

== Reception ==
Professional ratings
Review scores
Source	Rating
Allmusic	2.5/5 stars

The initial Billboard magazine review from February 23, 1959 awarded the album four stars and commented that "Should I", "Don't Blame Me", "All Over Again", and "Sunday" "reveal a new side of the versatile young chanter" and that the "set can attract buys from adult and teen buyers".

== Track listing ==
1. "You're Driving Me Crazy" (Walter Donaldson)
2. "I Only Have Eyes For You" (Al Dubin, Harry Warren)
3. "Don't Blame Me" (Jimmy McHugh, Dorothy Fields)
4. "All I Do Is Dream of You" (Nacio Herb Brown, Arthur Freed)
5. "All Over Again" (Tommy Edwards)
6. "I'm Confessin'" (Al Neiburg, Doc Daugherty, Ellis Reynolds)
7. "Should I?" (Brown, Freed)
8. "I'm Yours" (Robert Mellin)
9. "Sunday" (Chester Conn, Benny Krueger, Ned Miller, Jule Styne)
10. "My Happiness" (Betty Peterson Blasco, Borney Bergantine)
11. "That Old Feeling" (Sammy Fain, Lew Brown)
12. "Afraid"

== Personnel ==
- Tommy Sands – vocals
- Bob Bain – arranger
