= Lili Gentle =

American actress (born 1940)

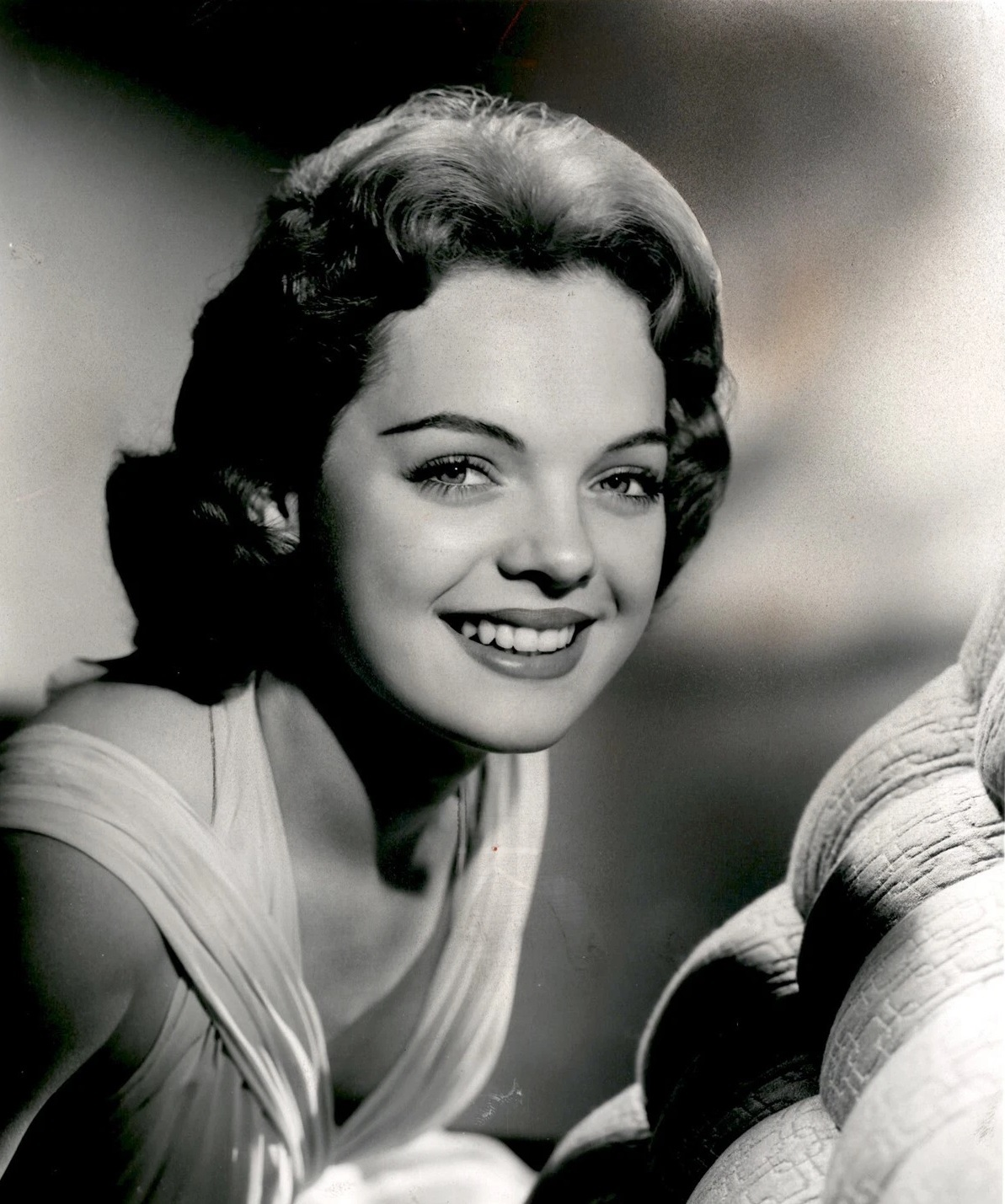
- Gentle in Mr. Hobbs Takes a Vacation (1962)
- Born: March 4, 1940 (age 86); Montgomery, Alabama, U.S.
- Occupation: Actress
- Years active: 1956–1962
- Spouse: Richard Zanuck (m. 1958)
- Children: 2

Lili Gentle (born March 4, 1940) is an American retired actress who appeared during the Golden Age of Hollywood, best remembered for her lead role with Tommy Sands in Sing Boy Sing.

== Life and career ==
Lili Gentle was born in Montgomery, Alabama, on March 4, 1940, the daughter of J. C. Gentle. Soon after her birth the family moved to Birmingham, Alabama. She attended Woodlawn High School in Birmingham, and acted at the Pickwick Theater.

Gentle's participation in the Junior Division of the Miss Alabama contest led to her having a screen test with 20th Century Fox Studios, and that resulted in a seven-year contract. Gentle, who recovered from having polio, was Hollywood's March of Dimes Girl in 1956. In that role she made personal appearances and appeared in televised promotional messages for the March of Dimes fund drive. She was also honorary chairman of the Alabama March of Dimes Campaign. During her time in those roles her sister, Janet, was in an iron lung in Crippled Children's Hospital in Birmingham.

She made her film debut in an uncredited role in Carousel (1956). In 1956, she had bit parts in Teenage Rebel and The Girl Can't Help It, starring Jayne Mansfield. In 1957, she earned a supporting role opposite Mansfield in Will Success Spoil Rock Hunter?. In 1958, she starred with Tommy Sands in the dramatic-musical Sing, Boy, Sing. Her last film role was in 1962 in Mr. Hobbs Takes a Vacation.

Gentle frequently acted on television in shows such as The 20th Century Fox Hour (1956); Matinee Theatre (1957); and Playhouse 90 (1957).

On January 14, 1958, she married film executive Richard Zanuck in Santa Monica, California. In February 1958 she announced that she was retiring from acting, preferring to become "just a plain housewife". After they had two daughters, she returned to acting.

== Filmography ==
Film
Year	Title	Role	Notes
1956	Carousel	Young Girl #1	Uncredited
1956	Teenage Rebel	Gloria	
1956	The Girl Can't Help It		Uncredited
1957	Will Success Spoil Rock Hunter?	April Hunter	
1957	Young and Dangerous	Rosemary Clinton	Billed as Lilli Gentle
1958	Sing, Boy, Sing	Leora Easton	
1962	Mr. Hobbs Takes a Vacation	Janie Grant	Final film role
Television
Year	Title	Role	Notes
1956	The 20th Century Fox Hour	Lenore Age 17	1 episode (as Lily Gentle)
1956	Matinee Theatre		1 episode
1957	Playhouse 90	Marilyn Flood	1 episode
