= Coogan's Bluff (film) =

1968 film by Don Siegel

- Theatrical release poster
- Directed by: Donald Siegel
- Screenplay by: Herman Miller; Dean Riesner; Howard Rodman
- Story by: Herman Miller
- Produced by: Donald Siegel
- Starring: Clint Eastwood; Susan Clark; Don Stroud; Tisha Sterling; Betty Field; Lee J. Cobb
- Cinematography: Bud Thackery
- Edited by: Sam E. Waxman
- Music by: Lalo Schifrin
- Production company: The Malpaso Company
- Distributed by: Universal Pictures
- Release date: October 2, 1968
- Running time: 94 minutes
- Country: United States
- Language: English
- Budget: $1.5 million
- Box office: $3.1 million

Coogan's Bluff is a 1968 American crime thriller film directed and produced by Donald Siegel. It stars Clint Eastwood, Susan Clark, Don Stroud, Tisha Sterling, Betty Field, and Lee J. Cobb. The film marks the first of five collaborations between Siegel and Eastwood, which continued with Two Mules for Sister Sara (1970), The Beguiled (1971), Dirty Harry (1971), and Escape from Alcatraz (1979).

Eastwood plays the part of a veteran deputy sheriff from a rural county in Arizona, who travels to New York City to extradite an apprehended fugitive named Jimmy Ringerman, played by Stroud, who is wanted for murder.

The name of the film itself is a reference to a New York City natural landmark, Coogan's Bluff, a promontory in upper Manhattan overlooking the site of the former long-time home of the New York Giants baseball club, the Polo Grounds, with a double meaning derived from the name of the lead character.

== Plot ==
Walter "Walt" Coogan, a deputy sheriff of fictional Piute County, Arizona, is sent to New York City to extradite escaped killer James Ringerman. NYPD Detective Lieutenant McElroy informs him that Ringerman is recovering from an overdose of LSD and refuses to release him into Coogan's custody without extradition papers stamped by the New York State Supreme Court.

Coogan flirts with probation officer Julie Roth and takes her out for lunch. He goes to the prison hospital and bluffs his way to Ringerman, tricks the attendants into turning him over, and sets out to catch a plane for Arizona. Before he can get to the airport, Ringerman's girlfriend Linny and his associate Pushie ambush Coogan and enable Ringerman to escape. Detective McElroy is furious with Coogan and warns him against playing policeman in New York.

Coogan learns Linny's name from a visit to Ringerman's mother. While he is at Roth's apartment for supper, Coogan learns that Linny is on probation, and he finds her address in Roth's home files. He tracks Linny to a nightclub, where she offers to lead him to Ringerman. Instead, she takes Coogan to a pool hall, where he is attacked by Pushie and a dozen men in a bloody fistfight. Coogan holds his own for a while but is eventually overpowered. After hearing sirens, the men take off, but not before the beaten Coogan kills Pushie and two others. Detective McElroy finds the bar in pieces and Coogan's cowboy hat on the floor.

Coogan finds Linny and threatens to kill her if she does not lead him to Ringerman. She takes him to Ringerman, who is hiding out at the Cloisters and carrying Coogan's stolen service weapon. Ringerman empties the gun trying to shoot Coogan and tosses it before fleeing on a motorcycle. Coogan steals one of his own and gives chase through Fort Tryon Park, before eventually capturing Ringerman.

He hands the fugitive over to McElroy, who once again tells him to go to the district attorney's office and to let "the system handle this." Sometime later, Coogan, with Ringerman in cuffs, prepares to leave for the airport via helicopter from the helipad atop the Pan Am building. At the last minute, Julie Roth runs up to the helicopter to give Coogan a long good-bye kiss. Coogan's last view is Roth waving goodbye from the helipad as the helicopter lifts off.

== Cast ==
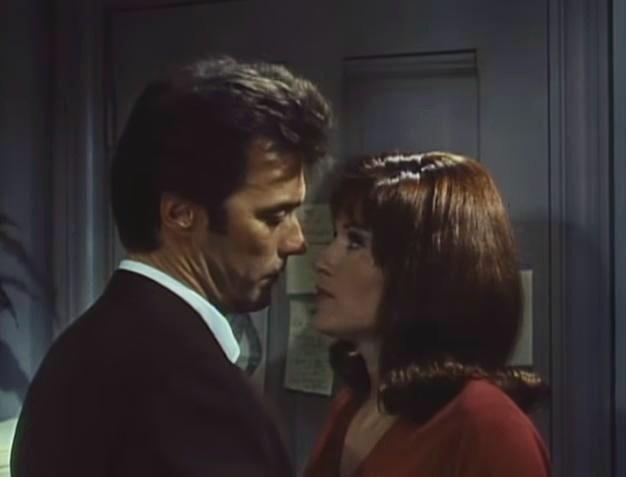
Eastwood and Clark in the film

- Clint Eastwood as Coogan
- Lee J. Cobb as Lieutenant McElroy
- Susan Clark as Julie Roth
- Tisha Sterling as Linny Raven
- Don Stroud as Ringerman
- Betty Field as Mrs. Ringerman
- Tom Tully as Sheriff McCrea
- Melodie Johnson as Millie
- James Edwards as Sgt. Jackson
- Rudy Diaz as Running Bear
- David Doyle as Pushie (as David F. Doyle)
- Louis Zorich as the taxi driver
- Seymour Cassel as Joe, "Young Hood"
- Albert Popwell as Wonderful Digby

== Production ==
Before Hang 'Em High had been released, Eastwood had set to work on Coogan's Bluff, a project which saw him reunite with Universal Studios after an offer of $1 million, more than doubling his salary for the previous film. Jennings Lang was responsible for the deal. Lang was a former agent of Don Siegel's, a Universal contract director who had been eyed to handle Coogan's Bluff, which would be Eastwood's second major American film. Eastwood was not familiar with Siegel's work, but Lang arranged for them to meet at Clint's residence in Carmel. Eastwood, having seen three of Siegel's earlier films by then, was impressed with his directing and the two became friends, forming a close partnership in the years that followed.

The idea for Coogan's Bluff originated in early 1967 as a pilot for a potential TV series, and the first draft was drawn up by Herman Miller and Jack Laird, screenwriters for Eastwood's old show Rawhide. The basic premise concerned a character named "Walt Coogan", a lonely deputy sheriff working in New York City.

After Siegel and Eastwood had agreed to work together, Howard Rodman and three other writers were hired to devise a new script as the new team scouted for locations including New York City and the Mojave Desert. However, Eastwood surprised the team one day by calling an abrupt meeting where he admitted his strong dislike of the script (which by now had gone through seven drafts) and a preference for Miller's original concept. This experience also shaped Eastwood's distaste for multiple redrafting scripts in his later career.

Eastwood and Siegel hired a new writer, Dean Riesner, who had written for Siegel in the Henry Fonda TV film Stranger on the Run. Eastwood did not communicate with the screenwriter until one day Riesner criticized a scene Eastwood had liked that involved Coogan having sex with Linny Raven in the hope that she would take him to her "boyfriend". According to Riesner, Eastwood's "face went white and gave me one of those Clint looks".

The two soon reconciled their differences and worked on a script in which Eastwood had considerable input. Don Stroud was cast as the psychopathic criminal Coogan is chasing, Lee J. Cobb as the disagreeable NYPD lieutenant he has to deal with, Susan Clark as a probation officer who falls for Coogan, and Tisha Sterling as the drug-using lover of Stroud's character. Coogan's Bluff was the final film appearance of actress Betty Field (who played the mother of Stroud's character) before her death in 1973. Filming began in November 1967 even before the full script had been finalized.

== Reception ==
“As Walt Coogan, the 20th-century personification of 19th-century values and ethics, Eastwood strides through the urban landscape, breaking rules and offending those upon whom he depends for help. Lee J. Cobb, as a police Lieutenant, into whose domain Eastwood stalks, tells him angrily that ‘We’ve got a system here. Not much, but we’re fond of it.’”

Coogan's Bluff was released in the United States in October 1968, where it grossed over $3.1 million. The film was controversial for its portrayal of violence, but it launched a collaboration between Eastwood and Siegel that lasted more than 10 years and set the prototype for the macho hero that Eastwood would play in the Dirty Harry films. The script of the film inspired the McCloud television series that starred Dennis Weaver.

On Rotten Tomatoes, the film has an approval rating of 95% with a mean of 6.6 of a possible 10 based on reviews from 19 critics. Roger Ebert of The Chicago Sun-Times gave it 3 out of 4 stars, stating the film was in some ways formulaic but nonetheless well-made and effectively acted: "Siegel knows what he wants and gets it." Vincent Canby of The New York Times gave it a negative review, and wrote: "The screenplay is so predictable in situation and so arch in its supposedly tough, blunt, wise talk that it turns into a joke told by someone with no sense of humor." In 2006, Kim Newman of Empire gave the film 4 out of 5, calling it a "New York cop thriller with a touch of the Western and a touch of the Eastwood...and all the better for it."

Quentin Tarantino said the film "plays like a trial run for the next 20 years of action cinema. It's with Coogan's Bluff that Eastwood would establish his post-Leone persona. A persona that would dominate action cinema for the next 25 years."

== Home media ==
The DVD version of Coogan's Bluff is edited by about three minutes in all regions for unknown reasons. The missing scenes include Coogan receiving his assignment to return Ringerman from New York, a short scene in a hospital, and a scene in which Julie talks about Coogan's Bluff, a lookout point over the ocean near New York (the real Coogan's Bluff is a site on Manhattan Island between Washington Heights and Harlem), tying the location into the film's title. The earlier video release did not have these edits, and was released uncut.

== See also ==
- List of American films of 1968
- New York Airways
- Pan Am Building

== Bibliography ==
- Hughes, Howard (2009). Aim for the Heart. London: I.B. Tauris. ISBN 978-1-84511-902-7.
- Kass, Judith M. (1975). Don Seigel: The Hollywood Professionals, Volume 4 (1975 ed.). New York: Tanvity Press. p. 207. ISBN 0-498-01665-X.
- McGilligan, Patrick (1999). Clint: The Life and Legend. London: HarperCollins. ISBN 0-00-638354-8.
- Munn, Michael (1992). Clint Eastwood: Hollywood's Loner. London: Robson Books. ISBN 0-86051-790-X.
