= Dream with Me (Tommy Sands album) =

1960 studio album by Tommy Sands

Studio album by Tommy Sands
- Released: 1960
- Recorded: 1960
- Genre: Traditional pop
- Label: Capitol T1426

Tommy Sands chronology
Sands at the Sands (1960)	Dream with Me (1960)	Seasons in the Sun (1969)

Dream with Me is an album by the American singer Tommy Sands. It was arranged by Nelson Riddle and released in 1960.

In his biography for September in the Rain, Peter J. Levinson wrote that Riddle’s arrangements for Sands were "as original and as stimulating as he wrote for any singer, and obviously Sands was musically comfortable with him". Sands commended Riddle as the "best arranger I ever worked with".

In her book Great Pretenders: My Strange Love Affair with '50s Pop Music, Karen Schoemer describes Dream with Me as "a surrealist knock-out, a musing on the unreality of love. Angel voices hovered, tempos drifted like clouds, and the songs didn't seem to start and stop so much as get up, stretch, and lie down again. The effect was practically psychedelic".

== Reception ==
Professional ratings
Review scores
Source	Rating
Allmusic	4.5/5 stars

The initial Billboard magazine review from 5 September 1960 awarded the album with three stars, commenting that Sands "tried very hard on this new album to handle a group of standards in a relaxed, romantic style, but it doesn't quite come off. He handled the tunes in fair fashion". They have described that Riddle's orchestrations were “excellent".

== Track listing ==
1. "Dream with Me" – 3:14
2. "Will I Find My Love Today" – 3:29
3. "Lazy Afternoon" (Jerome Moross, John La Touche) – 3:39
4. "Far Away Places" (Joan Whitney, Alex Kramer) – 3:46
5. "Whispering Grass" (Fred Fisher, Doris Fisher) – 3:11
6. "A Dreamer's Holiday" (Mabel Wayne, Kim Gannon) – 3:22
7. "When I Fall in Love" (Victor Young, Edward Heyman) – 3:29
8. "Dreamsville" (Ray Evans, Jay Livingston, Henry Mancini) – 3:18
9. "Lying In the Hay" (Jean Franc-Nohain, Mireille) – 2:48
10. "It's So Peaceful In the Country" (Alec Wilder) – 3:52
11. "Dream" – 3:27
12. "A Boy and His Dreams" – 3:56

== Personnel ==
- Tommy Sands – vocals
- Nelson Riddle – arranger
