= The Violent Ones =

- Original film poster
- Directed by: Fernando Lamas
- Written by: Charles Davis; Doug Wilson; Fred Freiberger (story); Herman Miller (story)
- Produced by: Robert Stabler
- Starring: Fernando Lamas; Aldo Ray; Tommy Sands
- Cinematography: Fleet Southcott
- Edited by: Fred W. Berger
- Music by: Marlin Skiles
- Production company: Harold Goldman Associates
- Distributed by: Feature Film Corp. of America; United Artists
- Release date: October 1967
- Running time: 95 minutes
- Country: United States
- Language: English

The Violent Ones is a 1967 film directed by and starring Fernando Lamas. The story was written and created by Charles Davis, Fred Freiberger, Herman Miller, and Doug Wilson. The film was shot in the Alabama Hills, Mojave Desert and Lone Pine, California. It was Tommy Sands's last movie before his retirement.

== Plot ==
Juanita, a girl in a town populated by Hispanics, is raped and beaten. The only thing she says before falling into a deep coma is say that her attacker is an outsider, a Gringo. Local Mexican-American Sheriff Vega arrests all three outsiders there are. All he can do is intimidate the prisoners so that one of them admits to being the attacker, or that the girl wakes up to identify him. The girl dies, and her father prepares a lynch mob.

The sheriff cannot get any help from the state, and even Mendoza, his deputy, is unwilling to help him. The sheriff takes the prisoners out of the jail in a trip to the closest city where they can be processed. But the prisoners, an unstable kid, a brutish man and a coldly intelligent youngster have other plans.

== Cast ==
- Fernando Lamas – Manuel Vega
- Aldo Ray – Joe Vorzyck
- Tommy Sands – Mike Marain
- David Carradine – Lucas Barnes
- Ned Romero - Mendoza
- Lisa Gaye – Dolores
- Melinda Marx – Juanita
- Rodolfo Acosta - Estévez
