= Herman Miller (writer) =

American writer and film producer

Herman Miller (November 10, 1919 – April 18, 1999) was a Hollywood film writer and producer.

== Biography ==
Miller was born on November 10, 1919, in New York City, to Morris Miller (1871–1947) and Esther Booke (1881–1933). He was of Polish Jewish descent. Miller pursued both undergraduate and graduate studies at the University of Southern California, where he received his B.A. in 1950 and M.F.A. in 1952.

The television show Kung Fu (1972–1975) was developed by Miller. He was a co-producer for the series and wrote the first three episodes ("King of the Mountain," "Dark Angel," and "Blood Brother").

Miller was responsible for the story of the 1968 feature film Coogan's Bluff starring Clint Eastwood. He co-wrote the screenplay with Dean Riesner and Howard Rodman. Miller's work on this film is credited with inspiring the television show McCloud. Miller also wrote for a number of television series, including Daniel Boone and MacGyver. He wrote the play The Ulysses Complex – and Penelope Not So Simple Either, which was performed off-Broadway during the 1980s.

He died at the age of 79 on April 18, 1999, in Los Angeles.

== Select filmography ==
- Houston Knights (1987)
- MacGyver (1985)
- Mickey Spillane's Mike Hammer (1984)
- Knight Rider (1982)
- Man from Atlantis (1977)
- Search for the Gods (1975)
- Kung Fu (1972–1975)
- Coogan's Bluff (1968)
- The Violent Ones (1967)
- Daniel Boone (1964)
- The Virginian (1962)
- The Beverly Hillbillies (1962)
- Rawhide (1959)

== Awards ==
1972: Writers Guild of America Award for Best Drama – "King of the Mountain", Kung Fu

== Obituaries ==
- Variety obituary
- USC Magazine, Autumn 1999, obituary (scroll down to 1950)
