= George Brenlin =

American actor (1927–1986)

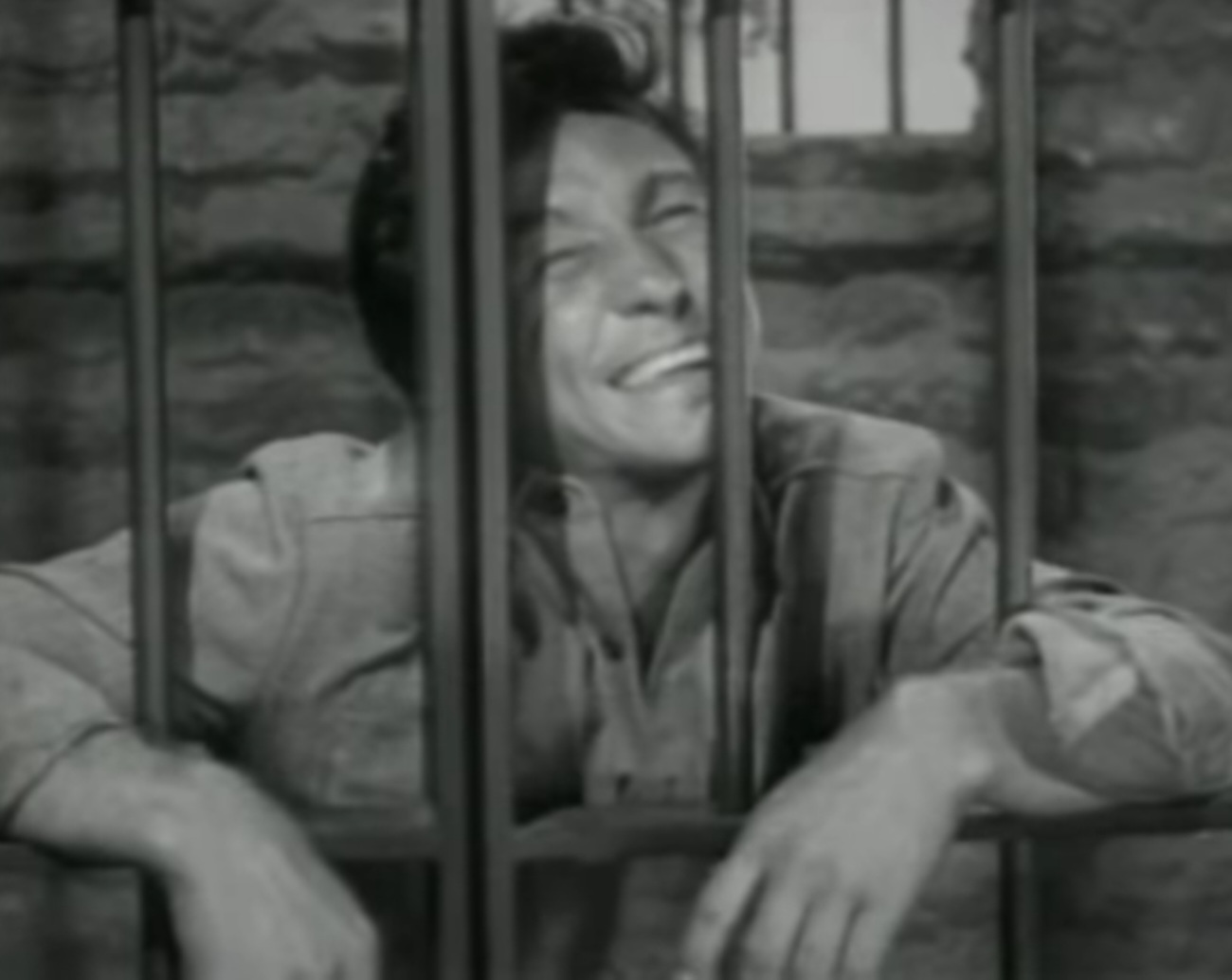
- Brenlin in The Deputy, 1961
- Born: George Henry Brendlinger; October 10, 1927; Pitcairn, Pennsylvania, U.S.
- Died: September 21, 1986 (aged 58); Los Angeles, California, U.S.
- Occupation: Actor
- Years active: 1956–1986

George Henry Brendlinger (October 10, 1927 – September 21, 1986) was an American actor. He was known for his starring role of Weasel Martin in the 1957 film Young and Dangerous.

Brenlin was born in Pitcairn, Pennsylvania. He served in the United States Navy. He appeared as Jimmie Burke in an episode of the western television series The Deputy and as Coley Barnes in the legal drama television series Perry Mason. In 1956, he played a lead role in the Broadway play Pictures in the Hallway. He guest-starred in television programs including Gunsmoke, Bonanza, 12 O'Clock High, The Fugitive, Rawhide, Adam-12 (4 episodes), Columbo, Tales of Wells Fargo and The Californians.

Brenlin died on September 21, 1986, at the age of 58. He was buried at Riverside National Cemetery.

== Partial filmography ==
- The Proud and Profane (1956) - Casualty (uncredited)
- Alfred Hitchcock Presents (1957) (Season 2 Episode 29: "Vicious Circle") - Georgie
- Gunsmoke (1957) (Season 3 Episode 6: “Jesse") - Jesse Pruett
- Young and Dangerous (1957) - Weasel Martin
- Riot in Juvenile Prison (1959) - Matches (uncredited)
- Cimarron (1960) - Hoss Barry
- Bonanza (1963) (Season 4 Episode 30: "Saga of Whizzer McGee ") - Whizzer McGee
- Inside Moves (1980) - Gil
