= When I'm Thinking of You =

Studio album by Tommy Sands
- Released: 1959
- Recorded: 1959
- Genre: Traditional pop
- Label: Capitol T1239

Tommy Sands chronology
| This Thing Called Love (1959) | When I'm Thinking of You (1959) | Sands at the Sands (1960) |

When I'm Thinking of You is an album by American singer Tommy Sands. It was arranged by Nelson Riddle and released in 1959.

In his biography of Riddle, September in the Rain, Peter J. Levinson wrote that Riddle's arrangements for Sands were "as original and as stimulating as he wrote for any singer, and obviously Sands was musically comfortable with him". Sands subsequently described Riddle as the "best arranger I ever worked with".

== Reception ==
Professional ratings
Review scores
| Source | Rating |
|---|---|
| Allmusic | 3/5 stars |

The initial Billboard magazine review from September 28, 1959 commented that "Sands has a strong package to follow his This Thing Called Love...It's a good jockey programming item with one side devoted to sweet love songs and the other to sadder tunes. ...Backing by Nelson Riddle is excellent".

== Track listing ==
1. "Hello, Young Lovers" (Richard Rodgers, Oscar Hammerstein II)
2. "The Nearness of You" (Hoagy Carmichael, Ned Washington)
3. "Always" (Irving Berlin)
4. "I'm Glad There Is You" (Jimmy Dorsey, Paul Madeira)
5. "It Had to Be You" (Isham Jones, Gus Kahn)
6. "What a Diff'rence a Day Made" (María Grever, Stanley Adams)
7. "I'll Remember April" (Gene de Paul, Patricia Johnston, Don Raye)
8. "Fools Rush In (Where Angels Fear to Tread)" (Johnny Mercer, Rube Bloom)
9. "Say It Isn't So" (Berlin)
10. "More Than You Know" (Vincent Youmans, Billy Rose, Edward Eliscu)
11. "I Get the Blues When It Rains" (Harry Stoddard, Marcy Klauber)
12. "I'll Be Seeing You" (Sammy Fain, Irving Kahal)

== Personnel ==
- Tommy Sands – vocals
- Nelson Riddle – arranger
