= Toward the Unknown =

1956 film by Mervyn LeRoy

- Theatrical film poster
- Directed by: Mervyn LeRoy
- Written by: Beirne Lay Jr.
- Produced by: Mervyn LeRoy
- Starring: William Holden; Virginia Leith; Lloyd Nolan
- Cinematography: Hal Rosson
- Edited by: William H. Ziegler
- Music by: Paul Baron (Song: "The U.S. Air Force", written by Robert MacArthur Crawford (Note: "The U.S. Air Force" song often informally called "Off we go into the wild blue yonder" was rewritten from an earlier song and performed for the first time in film in Toward the Unknown.))
- Color process: WarnerColor (Note: WarnerColor was the studio's name for the Eastmancolor process.)
- Production company: Toluca Productions
- Distributed by: Warner Bros. Pictures
- Release date: October 1956
- Running time: 115 minutes
- Country: United States
- Language: English
- Budget: $2.2 million (US)

Toward the Unknown, originally called Flight Test Center and titled Brink of Hell in its UK release, is a 1956 American aviation film about the dawn of supersonic flight filmed on location at Edwards Air Force Base. Starring William Holden, Lloyd Nolan and Virginia Leith, the film features the screen debut of James Garner.

Toward the Unknown was directed by Mervyn LeRoy and written by Beirne Lay, Jr. who had also penned the novel and screenplay for Twelve O'Clock High (1949), and later screenplays for Above and Beyond (1952) and Strategic Air Command (1955). The film's title is derived from the motto of the Air Force Flight Test Center, Ad Inexplorata.

== Plot ==
USAF Major Lincoln Bond was captured during the Korean War and subjected to torture, finally cracking after 14 months and signing a confession used for propaganda. Upon his release, he took a year to recover from the ordeal before showing up at the Flight Test Center at Edwards Air Force Base, hoping to return to work as a test pilot. On his arrival a plane crash lands nearby on the dry lake bed; he races to offer assistance, braving flames and explosion to attempt to pry the canopy free and save the pilot. His old buddy, Colonel McKee, tries his best for him, but in spite of recognizing him as the stranger who attempted to save his life, notoriously strong-willed base commander Brigadier General Banner turns him down because he does not trust him to be stable. A complication is that the general's secretary and love interest, Connie Mitchell, is an old flame of Bond's with strongly conflicted feelings toward him. Bond presses for any job and accepts the general's offer of routine flying in support. Banner is a hands-on leader, taking the most dangerous assignments himself.

When Bond flies the new Gilbert XF-120 fighter, he finds dangerous structural problems that threaten its imminent acceptance by the Air Force. He claims he did not press the aircraft beyond its design specifications, but no one believes him, especially H. G. Gilbert, the head of the company that built the fighter. When the general tries to duplicate Bond's maneuvers, nothing untoward happens. Afterward, Bond sees Banner nearly collapse in the locker room, but Banner tries to deflect the incident.

When Banner is endangered in a test flight Bond calmly and expertly comes to the rescue, helping to build a bond of trust between the pair. Bond's rehabilitation is endangered when a drunk Major "Bromo" Lee, Banner's top test pilot, tries to pick a fight with him at the officers club. Bond reacts badly to being held by a bystander, invoking memories of his Korean War imprisonment, and punches Bromo twice. Then Major Joe Craven, another close friend of Bond's, is killed when a wing of his XF-120 tears away, confirming Bond's warning.

With an appreciation that both pilots were to blame for the altercation, Banner eschews punishment and instead gives Bond the assignment he craves: the rocket-powered X-2, which is designed to fly to the edge of outer space. The general insists, however, on piloting the first full-power test himself, despite strong pressure from his superior, Lieutenant General Bryan Shelby, McKee, and Bond – who calls him on his locker-room collapse to no avail – to let a younger man take on the dangerous job. When Bond is assigned to fly the last half-power test before the main flight, he goes to full power without authorization and barely survives a high-altitude bailout when the aircraft goes out of control. The base flight surgeon tells Banner that only a young, fit person could have survived, leading the general to accept a promotion and transfer, and cover Bond's trail by claiming he had given him verbal authorization to go to full power if he saw fit, sparing Bond censure in return for saving his life. He recommends Colonel McKee as his successor. Although Banner offers to take Connie with him to his new assignment, she decides to stay with Bond.

== Cast ==
As appearing in Toward the Unknown, (main roles and screen credits identified):

- William Holden as Major Lincoln Bond (Note: Gregory Peck and Clark Gable were originally cast to be Major Bond and General Banner.)
- Lloyd Nolan as Brigadier General Bill Banner
- Virginia Leith as Connie Mitchell
- Charles McGraw as Colonel R. H. "Mickey" McKee
- Murray Hamilton as Major "Bromo" Lee
- Paul Fix as Lieutenant General Bryan Shelby
- James Garner as Major Joe Craven
- L. Q. Jones as 2nd Lieutenant Sweeney
- Karen Steele as Polly Craven
- Bartlett Robinson as Senator Black
- Malcolm Atterbury as Hank
- Ralph Moody as H. G. Gilbert
- Maura Murphy as Sarah McKee
- Carol Kelly as Debbie
- James Westmoreland as Pilot (uncredited)
- Jon Provost as Major Craven's Son (uncredited) (Note: Five-year-old Provost would win fame the next year in the Lassie television series.)

== Production ==
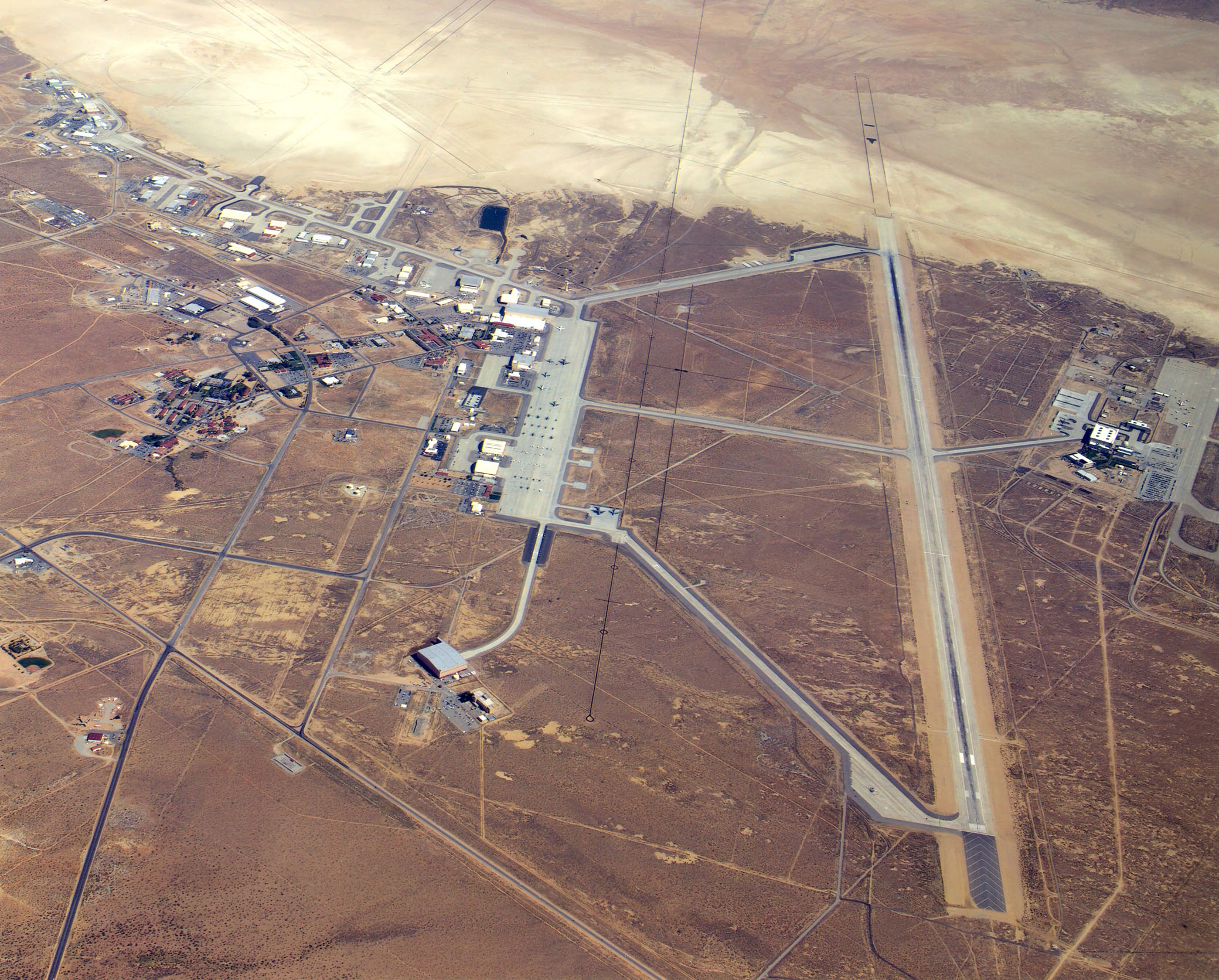
Aerial view of Edwards Air Force Base, California, showing the main base area located beside Rogers Dry Lake, both featured in Toward the Unknown

Like some other major stars of the era, Holden decided to try producing films himself, setting up Toluca Productions. In the end, however, he found the added work too much, and Toward the Unknown was the only Toluca film. As originally cast, starring roles had Clark Gable as General Banner and Gregory Peck as Major Bond, but contractual problems required a recasting, with Holden taking on the role of star as well as producer.

James Garner, who made his film debut in the movie, says director Mervyn LeRoy tried to "whip" him. "I jumped right back at him," he said. "He was famous for it, he'd just pick one guy and lord it over him for the whole picture. If he hadn't taken his pills early in the morning, he was nasty."

Toward the Unknown was produced with the full cooperation of the United States Air Force with principal photography taking place over the winter in 1955. As the first film to exploit the USAF's race into space in the X-plane program, the Toward the Unknown's tagline stated: "The screen's first story of man-piloted rocket ships, U.S.A.!" The extensive use of the Edwards AFB facility and its emergency dry lake beds, Rosamond Lake and Rogers Dry Lake, as well as the related air force community area, lend an air of authenticity to the production. Air Research and Development Command (ARDC) Technical Advisors Major Price Henry, Lieutenant Colonel Ralph Martin and Lieutenant Colonel Frank Everest Jr. served as technical advisors to the production. (Note: Lieutenant Colonel Frank Everest Jr. was a noted test pilot at Edwards AFB in the 1950s, involved in the X-2 flight program.)

Right out of the headlines of the day, Toward the Unknown also dealt with the controversial issue of military personnel undergoing torture and brainwashing, with the marketing campaign exploiting the mental anguish the character felt. Holden's character closely parallels three USAF pilots, Colonel Walker "Bud" Mahurin, an Air Force double ace who was shot down in Korea and tortured before signing confessions of war crimes, Lieutenant Colonel Everest, who had a similar prison experience after being shot down in China during World War II, and Capt. Milburn G. Apt, who died after losing control of the X-2 minutes after becoming the first pilot to exceed Mach 3. Holden and Everest, who was acting as the film's "air boss", became close friends during the production. In a similar manner, General Banner's character was based on Major General Albert Boyd, the first Commander of the USAF Flight Test Center at Edwards AFB. (Note: Holden managed to trade a ride in his Ferrari for a supersonic flight from General J.S. Holotner, head of the Flight Test Center.)

=== Aircraft ===
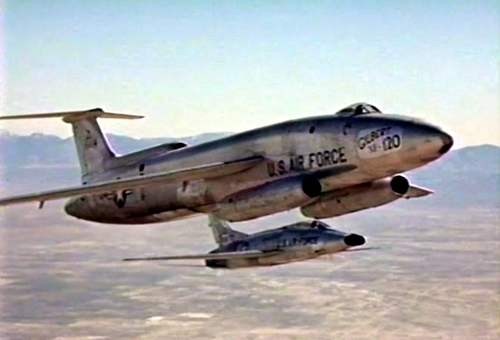
Screenshot of Martin XB-51 as the Gilbert XF-120 fighter with an F-100 chase plane in tow

Toward the Unknown was a showcase of the contemporary United States Air Force fleet of combat aircraft: Convair C-131 Samaritan, Convair F-102 Delta Dagger, Douglas B-66 Destroyer, Lockheed F-94 Starfire, McDonnell F-101 Voodoo, North American F-86 Sabre, North American F-100 Super Sabre, Republic F-84F Thunderstreak, and Sikorsky H-19D Chickasaw, shown on the ground and in the air. Unusual stock footage includes a rocket sled being tested, the use of the Boeing YKB-29T Superfortress aerial tanker with a F-100, F-101, and B-66 being fueled, and a Republic EF-84G Thunderjet in a zero-length launch. Also appearing in background shots were the Beech C-45 Expeditor, Boeing B-47 Stratojet, Convair B-36 Peacemaker, Douglas C-47 Skytrain, Lockheed T-33 Shooting Star, North American B-25 Mitchell, North American B-45 Tornado, and the Republic F-84 Thunderjet. The final aerial sequence is derived from an air show held at the base and depicts the 1955 version of the Thunderbirds air demonstration team, flying Republic F-84F Thunderstreak fighters in a scene described as "special ariobatics"[sic] in the credits.

The Bell X-2, its Boeing EB-50D mother ship, Douglas D-558-2 Skyrocket, and Douglas X-3 Stiletto are also featured as the experimental aircraft being tested at Edwards AFB. Footage of the mocked-up Convair XF-92 was used to depict the later F-102 fighter in the opening crash scene while the surviving Martin XB-51 bomber prototype stands in as the fictional "Gilbert XF-120" fighter. (Note: The first of the two Martin XB-51 prototypes, 46-685, still in its film livery, was en route from Edwards AFB to Eglin AFB, Florida, to shoot additional footage for the film when it crashed during takeoff following a refueling stop at El Paso, Texas, on March 25, 1956. The pilot, Major James Rudolph, was killed.)

== Reception ==
Toward the Unknown was critically reviewed as an example of the "actor-turned-producer fraternity", with screen idol William Holden heavily involved in the production. The film also mirrored the exploits of real-life test pilots such as Chuck Yeager who were the subjects of headlines all over the world. (Note: In the Officer's Club, the handprints of both Chuck Yeager and Glen Edwards (spelled incorrectly as "Glenn"), the test pilot whose name is commemorated in the name of the base, are shown.) Bosley Crowther of The New York Times, summed up its impact, however, as "The principals, to put it briefly, are never as fascinating as the aircraft pointed at the future in 'Toward the Unknown'."

Considered on its merits as a "flying" film that is "well worth seeing", later aviation film reviewers likewise bemoaned the "typical story about personal conflict and a woman's faith that infected all too many flying films." Following up on the art-or-artifice depiction, latter-day reviewer Christopher McQuain states that, "Finding anything of interest in 'Toward the Unknown' depends on whether you consider the film as art or artifact; it is not a good movie, but it is a fascinating, revealing one. It is utterly transparent Cold War propaganda, with delighted displays of military aircraft in action, an eager, anxious glimpse forward to the Space Race, and an interest in human-scale affairs so desultory as to make the machines and the ability to build and fly them seem much more important than the complications and consequences of militarism and war waged ..."

== Home media ==
Although occasionally shown on television, and screened at the Edwards AFB theater in 2006 to celebrate the 50th anniversary of its original premiere, Toward the Unknown was not released on home video until 2011. After sorting out rights with Holden's estate, the film was issued on DVD as part of the Warner Archive Collection.

== See also ==
- List of American films of 1956
