= Will Success Spoil Rock Hunter? =

1957 film by Frank Tashlin

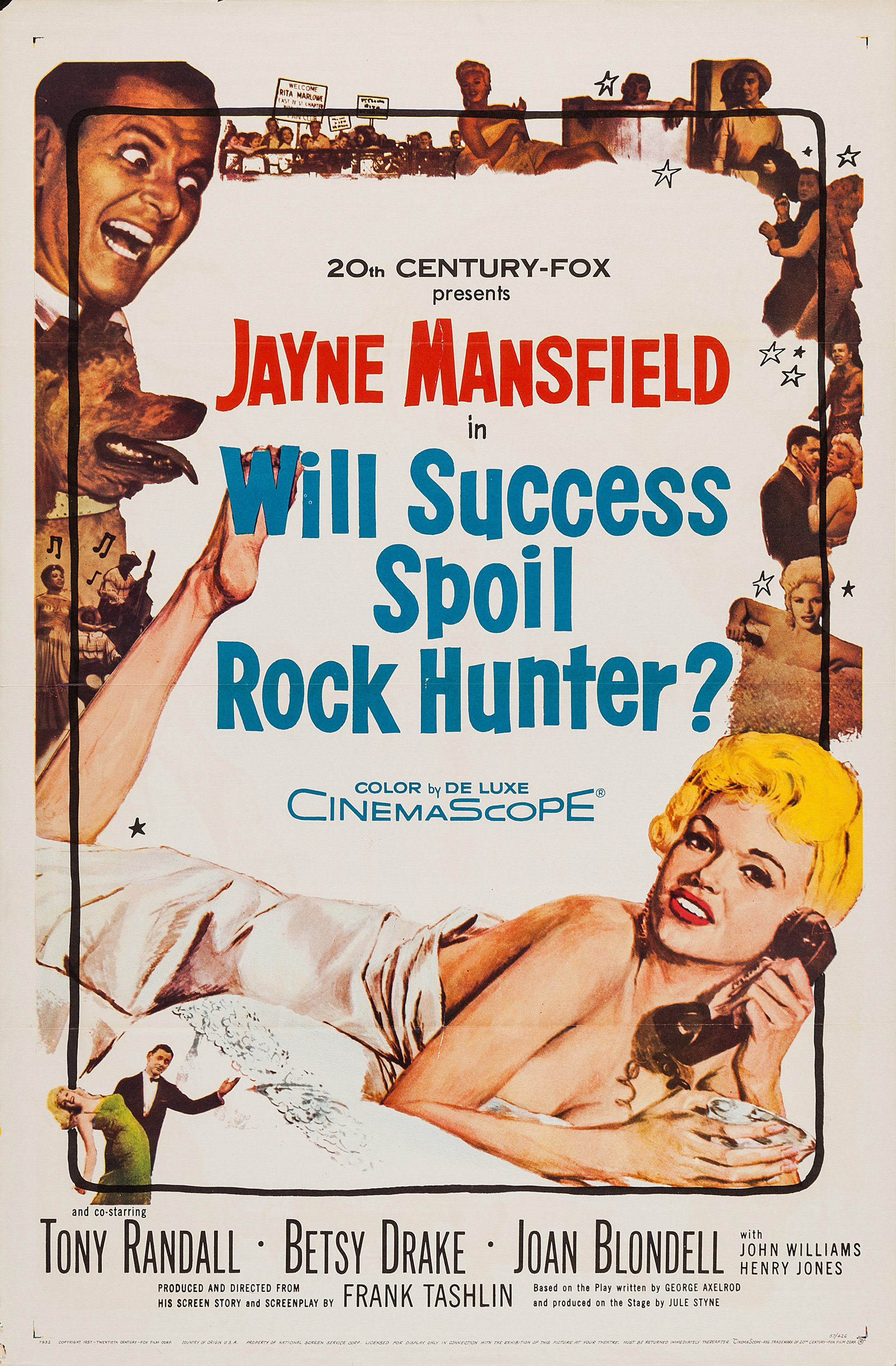
- Theatrical release poster by Tom Chantrell
- Directed by: Frank Tashlin
- Screenplay by: Frank Tashlin
- Based on: Rita Marlowe; 1955 play by George Axelrod
- Produced by: Frank Tashlin
- Starring: Jayne Mansfield; Tony Randall
- Cinematography: Joseph MacDonald
- Edited by: Hugh S. Fowler
- Music by: Cyril J. Mockridge
- Distributed by: 20th Century Fox
- Release date: July 29, 1957
- Running time: 93 minutes
- Country: United States
- Language: English
- Budget: $1 million
- Box office: $4.9 million

Will Success Spoil Rock Hunter? is a 1957 American satirical comedy film starring Jayne Mansfield and Tony Randall, with Betsy Drake, Joan Blondell, John Williams, Henry Jones, Lili Gentle, and Mickey Hargitay, and with a cameo by Groucho Marx. The film is a satire on popular fan culture, Hollywood hype, and the advertising industry, which was profiting from commercials on the relatively new medium of television. It also takes aim at the reduction television caused to the size of movie theater audiences in the 1950s. The film was known as Oh! For a Man! in the United Kingdom.

The film was produced and directed by Frank Tashlin, who also wrote the largely original screenplay, using little more than the title and the character of Rita Marlowe from the successful Broadway play Will Success Spoil Rock Hunter? by George Axelrod. The play had run from 1955 to 1956 and also starred Jayne Mansfield as Rita.

== Plot ==
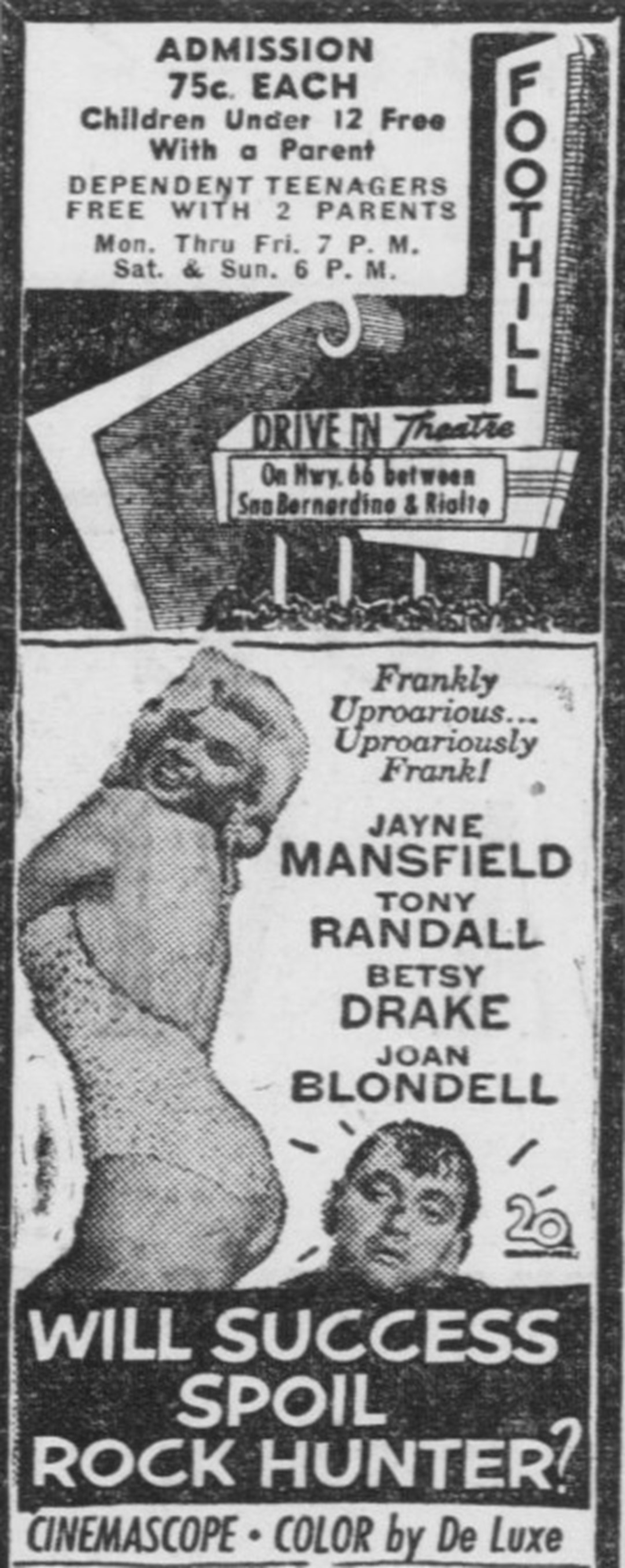
Drive-in advertisement from 1957

Struggling writer Rockwell P. Hunter is low rung of the ladder at the La Salle advertising agency. With the agency set to lose its biggest account — Stay-Put Lipstick — he hatches an idea to get the perfect model and spokeswoman for Stay-Put's new line of lipstick: famous actress Rita Marlowe. Fortunately, his teenage niece April — a huge fan of Rita — knows where Rita is staying in New York.

For Rita to endorse the lipstick, however, Rock has to act as her boyfriend to make her real boyfriend, TV actor Bobo Branigansky, jealous. Bobo leaks the news of Rita's new romance in a TV interview and Rock is suddenly famous as her "Lover Doll".

Rock's boss decides to leverage his employee's newfound fame, but when Rock gets Rita to agree on a television special sponsored by Stay-Put, Rock becomes the agency's highest-regarded employee. The two agree to continue this mutually beneficial relationship, garnering media attention for Rita and business for Rock. Rita, meanwhile, is miserable, as she is not over her one real true love, George Schmidlap, the man who discovered her. Unable to find Schmidlap, she pursues Rock, though her secretary Vi warns her that she is playing a dangerous game. Meanwhile, Rock's angry fiancée Jenny is jealous, and in a bid to get back his attention, starts dressing and talking like Rita, much to Rock's frustration.

Rock soon realizes that fame is a double-edged sword; it brings him what he desires, but at a cost. While women admire him, he struggles to find peace of mind. In the end, he climbs the corporate ladder and becomes the company president, only to realize that it is not what he truly wanted. Rock tells Jenny that achieving this success has left him feeling empty, and she decides to take him back.

As Rita opens her television special for Stay-Put, she is surprised by the appearance of the show's guest star (her one true love), George Schmidlap. The two kiss and reunite.

Freed from the strain of advertising, Rock and Jenny retire to the country to tend a chicken farm, announcing that he has found the real "living end".

== Cast ==
Actor	Role
Jayne Mansfield	Rita Marlowe
Tony Randall	Rockwell P. Hunter
Betsy Drake	Jenny Wells
Joan Blondell	Violet
John Williams	Irving La Salle Jr.
Henry Jones	Henry Rufus
Lili Gentle	April Hunter
Mickey Hargitay	Bobo Branigansky
Groucho Marx	George Schmidlap
Ann McCrea	Gladys
Barbara Eden	Miss Carstairs

== Production ==
Will Success Spoil Rock Hunter? received a nomination for a Golden Globe for Best Motion Picture Actor – Musical/Comedy (Tony Randall) and a nomination for the Writers Guild of America, East WGA Award (Screen) for Best Written American Comedy (Frank Tashlin). Initially, Tashlin envisioned Ed Sullivan for the role of Rockwell P. Hunter. Sullivan turned it down, so Tony Randall was awarded the part.

George Axelrod sold the rights to his play to Buddy Adler at Fox, which had just made Bus Stop, based on a script by Axelrod. The writer said "They didn't use my story, my play, or my script... I made it about the movies—they made it about television."

The film contains joking references to several of Mansfield's other roles, including The Girl Can't Help It (1956; also directed by Tashlin), Kiss Them for Me (1957), and The Wayward Bus (1957). The book Rita Marlowe reads in the bathtub scene is Peyton Place (1956) by Grace Metalious, which became a feature film and a popular TV series. The buxom characters in the book were claimed to have been inspired by Mansfield. Joan Blondell, who was herself a major movie sex symbol some 30 years before (her sexuality being an early target of the Hays Code), was cast as Mansfield's frumpy, middle-aged, all-business secretary.

Former silent film star Minta Durfee has an uncredited role as a scrubwoman.

Randall is featured at the beginning of the film playing the drums, a trumpet, and a cello during the 20th Century-Fox logo and fanfare sequence. At the end, he remarks, "Oh, the fine print they put in an actor's contract these days!" He also performs a comedic intermission midway through the film, which he says is for the audience used to television break.

In lieu of a theme song and opening of the film, Tashlin instead laid traditional opening credits over faux television commercials for products that failed to deliver what they promised.

== Legacy ==
Will Success Spoil Rock Hunter? is known as Mansfield's "signature film". In 1966 Frank Tashlin said it was the film of his with which he was "most satisfied... there was no compromise on that one. Buddy Adler let me do it my own way."

No less than ten television shows had episodes parodying the title of the film, usually substituting a series' character's name in place of Rock Hunter. Among the series who did so were The Munsters, My Three Sons, and The Bullwinkle Show.

There is a reference to this film in the film of the 1964 spy novel Funeral in Berlin, starring Michael Caine as Harry Palmer. When the secret agent Palmer gets forged papers with a new identity, he is dissatisfied with the name given to him and complains, "Rock Hunter! Why can't I be Rock Hunter?"

In 2000, the film was selected for preservation in the United States National Film Registry by the Library of Congress as being "culturally, historically, or aesthetically significant".

== Reception ==
=== Critical response ===
On review aggregator Rotten Tomatoes, 88% of 24 critics have given the film a positive review. James Powers of The Hollywood Reporter praised the film as "social satire at its most penetrating" with a focus on "the inanities of TV" and on the mainstream notion of success itself. Powers wrote: "The joy of Tashlin's parable is so funny that you don't feel the blow until you see the bruise. You are laughing at some very silly people that you do not realize until much later very much resemble you." Powers even claimed that the unconventional opening titles "could stand by themselves as among the funniest sequences ever filmed." Picturegoer called the film "the most savage debunking" of television to date, claiming Hollywood "cut its home-screen rival down to size." Variety praised the film and called it one of the funniest films of the year, noting how effective Frank Tashlin's "one-man band" approach was to the production: "Producer Tashlin obviously was determined to shoot the works for director Tashlin who in turn knew how to handle the scripter Tashlin. The magazine favorably noted that Mansfield did "a sock job" in the starring role.

Film critic Bosley Crowther of The New York Times criticized Tashlin's script as lacking "substance and cohesion," claiming that the satire failed to prove movie entertainment as superior to television. In his review, Crowther wrote: "People who live in glass houses should not throw stones at their television sets, no matter how scornful and superior they may feel toward video. The rocks may miss the vexing targets and crash through their own fragile walls. This axiom is clearly demonstrated in the flimsy motion picture that has been made from the flimsy stage play Will Success Spoil Rock Hunter?". He also criticized Mansfield's portrayal of Rita Marlowe, a character meant to impersonate Marilyn Monroe, calling the portrayal a "travesty."

Ethan de Seife wrote in his book, Tashlinesque: The Hollywood Comedies of Frank Tashlin, that we see with Son of Paleface, Marry Me Again, Artists and Models, Will Success Spoil Rock Hunter?, The Man from the Diners' Club, The Private Navy of Sergeant O'Farrell, and many others that American animation and American live-action comedy derive from the same tradition. Peter Lev wrote in his book, Twentieth Century-Fox: The Zanuck-Skouras Years, 1935–1965, "Will Success Spoil Rock Hunter? is more fragmented than The Girl Can't Help It, and paradoxically it makes it a better film."

=== Awards and nominations ===
Award	Category	Nominee(s)	Result
Cahiers du Cinéma	Best Film	Frank Tashlin	2nd Place
Golden Globe Awards	Best Actor in a Motion Picture – Musical or Comedy	Tony Randall	Nominated
National Film Preservation Board	National Film Registry		Inducted
Writers Guild of America Awards	Best Written American Comedy	Frank Tashlin	Nominated

=== Home media ===
Will Success Spoil Rock Hunter? is in a package called "The Jayne Mansfield Collection" along with The Girl Can't Help It (1956) and The Sheriff of Fractured Jaw (1958)

The film was released on VHS on July 2, 1996, by 20th Century Fox Home Entertainment.
