= Sands Storm =

Studio album by Tommy Sands
- Released: 1958
- Recorded: 1958
- Genre: Rock and roll, traditional pop
- Label: Capitol T1081

Tommy Sands chronology
Sing Boy Sing (1958)	Sands Storm (1958)	This Thing Called Love (1959)

Sands Storm is a 1958 album by American singer Tommy Sands.

== Reception ==
Professional ratings
Review scores
Source	Rating
Allmusic	3/5 stars

The initial Billboard magazine review from October 20, 1958 commented that "Sands has quite a varied program here...The lad puts a lot of heart and feeling into his renditions".

== Track listing ==
1. "Maybellene"
2. "Hearts of Stone"
3. "Since I Met You, Baby"
4. "Oop Shoop"
5. "Warm Your Heart"
6. "Hey, Miss Fannie"
7. "Tweedle Dee"
8. "Such a Night"
9. "Honey Love"
10. "Blue Velvet"
11. "Little Mama"
12. "Chicken and the Hawk"

== Personnel ==
- Tommy Sands – vocals
