= Tommy Sands =

American singer and actor (born 1937)

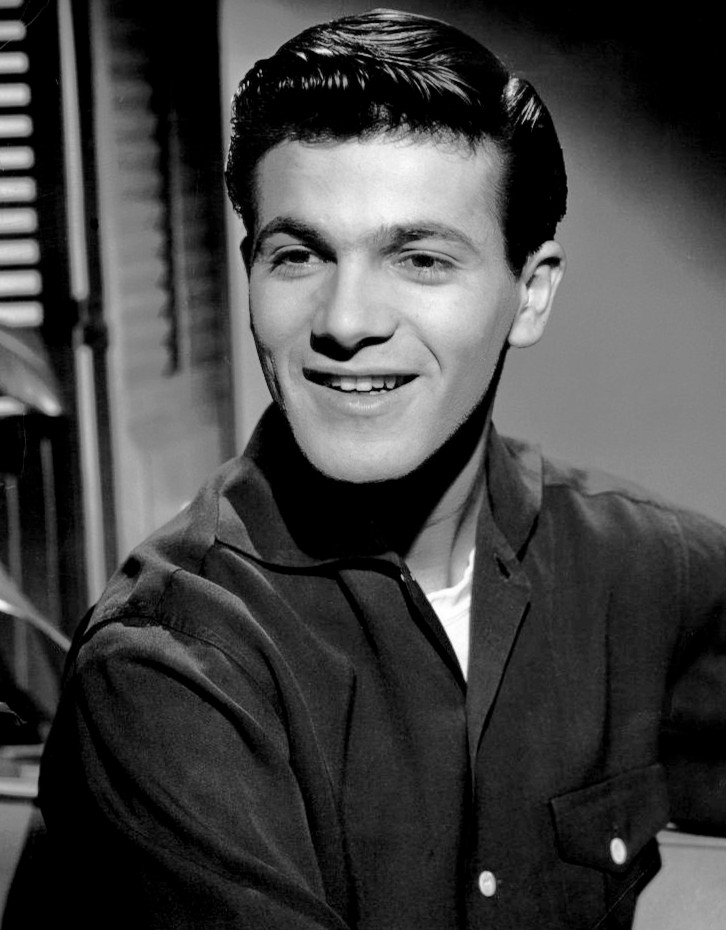
- Tommy Sands in 1957

Background information
- Born: Thomas Adrian Sands; August 27, 1937 (age 89); Chicago, Illinois, U.S.
- Genres: Country; Countrypolitan; Rockabilly; Pop music
- Occupations: Singer, actor
- Instruments: Vocals, guitar
- Years active: 1949–1978
- Labels: RCA; Capitol; Buena Vista; Vista; ABC; Liberty; Imperial; Superscope
- Spouse(s): Nancy Sinatra (m. 1960; div. 1965) Sheila Wallace (m. 1974)

Thomas Adrian Sands (born August 27, 1937) is an American country and pop music singer and actor. Working in show business as a child, Sands became an overnight sensation and instant teen idol when he appeared on Kraft Television Theater in January 1957 as "The Singin' Idol". The song from the show, "Teen-Age Crush", reached No. 2 on the Billboard Hot 100 and No. 1 on Cashbox. He is also known for his five-year marriage to Nancy Sinatra.

== Early life ==
Sands was born into a musical family in Chicago, Illinois; his father Ben, born in Russia, was Jewish and was a pianist, and his mother, Grace Dickson, a big-band singer. He moved with the family to Shreveport, Louisiana. He began playing the guitar at eight and within a year had a job performing twice weekly on a local radio station. At the beginning of his teen years, he moved to Houston, Texas, where he attended Bob Lanier Middle School and Lamar High School. He joined a band with "Jimmie Lee Durden and the Junior Cowboys", consisting of Sands, Durden, and Billy Reno. They performed on radio, at county fairs, and did personal appearances. He was 15 when Colonel Tom Parker heard about him and signed him to RCA Records.

== Career ==
In 1957 Sands was featured on Hometown Jubilee on KTLA television in Los Angeles.

=== “The Singin' Idol” ===
Sands's initial recordings achieved little in the way of sales but in early 1957 he was given the opportunity to star in an episode of Kraft Television Theatre called "The Singin’ Idol". He played the part of a singer who was very similar to Elvis Presley, with guitar, pompadour hair, and excitable teenage fans. On the show, his song presentation of a Joe Allison composition called "Teen-Age Crush" went over big with the young audience and, released as a single by Capitol Records, it went to No. 2 on the Billboard Hot 100 record chart and No. 1 on the Cashbox chart. It became a gold record.

His track, "The Old Oaken Bucket", peaked at No. 25 on the UK Singles Chart in 1960. He released his debut album Steady Date with Tommy Sands (1957).

Sands' sudden fame brought an offer to sing at the Academy Awards show. He did another episode of Kraft Television Theatre, "Flesh and Blood" (1957), playing the son of a gangster. He also made "The Promise" for Zane Grey Theatre (1957), playing the son of a character played by Carl Benton Reid and the brother of a character played by Gary Merrill.

=== 20th Century Fox ===
Sands' teen idol looks landed him a motion-picture contract with 20th Century Fox to star in a 1958 musical drama called Sing Boy Sing, the feature film version of "The Singin' Idol". Fox had enjoyed success with films starring other teen idols such as Elvis Presley and Pat Boone but Sing Boy Sing was a financial failure. It did get a worldwide release which gave Sands some international recognition and was well reviewed.

Sands appeared on CBS Television on January 9, 1958, in an episode of Shower of Stars, and played another singing star in "The Left-handed Welcome" for Studio One in Hollywood (1958). Sands supported Pat Boone in a musical for Fox, Mardi Gras (1958), which was a moderate hit. He also released the albums Sands Storm (1958), This Thing Called Love (1959), and When I'm Thinking of You (1959).

His later albums included Sands at the Sands (1960) and Dream with Me (1960). From May to November 1960, he served in the United States Air Force Reserves.

=== Later films ===
Sands' second lead role in a feature was in the teen comedy Love in a Goldfish Bowl (1961) with Fabian Forte, which was not a success. More popular was a fantasy musical he made at Disney, Babes in Toyland (1961), co-starring Annette Funicello. That year he and Funicello sang the Sherman Brothers' title song from the Walt Disney release of The Parent Trap. Sands guest starred on "The Inner Panic" for The United States Steel Hour and was one of several pop stars who played US Rangers in Fox's The Longest Day (1962).

Sands had married Nancy Sinatra whose father Frank offered Sands a role in Come Blow Your Horn but he turned it down. Sands studied acting in New York.

Sands appeared alongside Fred Astaire in "Blow High, Blow Clear" for Alcoa Theatre (1963). On May 14, 1963, Sands appeared, along with Claude Akins and Jim Davis, in "Trapped", one of the last episodes of NBC's Laramie western series. In the story line, series character Slim Sherman (John Smith) finds an injured kidnap victim in the woods, portrayed by Joan Freeman. Dennis Holmes, as series regular Mike Williams, rides away to seek help, but the kidnappers reclaim the hostage. Slim pursues the kidnappers but is mistaken as a third kidnapper by the girl's father, played by Barton MacLane. Sands played the girl's boyfriend, who had been ordered by her father to stop seeing her.

Sands made several appearances on Wagon Train including "The Davey Baxter Story", "The Larry Hanify Story," "The Gus Morgan Story" (with Peter Falk), and "The Bob Stuart Story".

Sands had a support role in the feature film Ensign Pulver (1964) at Warners. He guest starred on Slattery's People ("Question: Why the Lonely?... Why the Misbegotten?") and had a support role in the war feature None But the Brave (1965), starring and directed by Frank Sinatra. He received poor reviews for the latter which resulted in Sands punching out a critic.

Sands guest starred on Kraft Suspense Theatre ("A Lion Amongst Men", which earned him good reviews), Combat! ("More Than a Soldier"), Valentine's Day ("For Me and My Sal"), Mr. Novak ("Let's Dig a Little Grammar", "And Then I Wrote..."), Branded ("That the Brave Endure"), Bonanza ("The Debt"), and Hawaii Five-O ("No Blue Skies").

=== Career decline ===
Sands divorced Nancy Sinatra in 1965. "The doors to Hollywood seemed to slam shut after the divorce from Nancy", he said. "I couldn't get acting roles, my singing career on TV and in films was over." His last feature to date was The Violent Ones (1967) in which Sands had a supporting role. He moved to Hawaii in 1967.

=== Hawaii ===
In Hawaii, Sands operated the Tommy Sands Nightclub Tour for five years, and performed at the Outrigger Hotel in Waikiki. His later appearances included episodes of Hawaii Five-O ("No Blue Skies", "Hit Gun for Sale", "A Sentence to Steal"), and The Hardy Boys/Nancy Drew Mysteries ("Mystery on the Avalanche Express"). He occasionally returned to the mainland to work, appearing in dinner theatre.

Sands returned permanently to the mainland of the US in 1981, settling in Fort Wayne, Indiana. He toured regularly performing concerts.

== Personal life ==
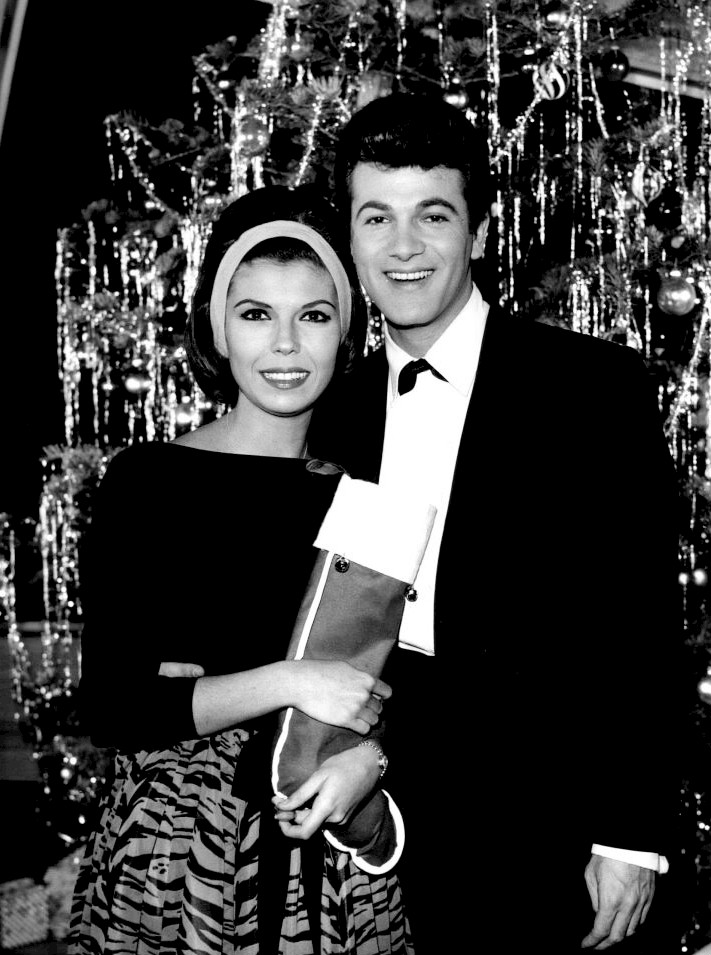
Nancy Sinatra and Tommy Sands, 1962

Sands and singer Nancy Sinatra married in 1960 and divorced in 1965. His career had declined significantly by 1965, triggering speculation that Frank Sinatra had him "blacklisted" in the entertainment industry after their divorce. Such reports were denied by both Sands and Sinatra. In 1974, Sands married Sheila Wallace, a secretary, in Honolulu, where he had relocated in an attempt to revive his career.

== Filmography ==
=== Film ===
Year	Film	Role
1958	Sing, Boy, Sing	Virgil Walker
1958	Mardi Gras	Barry Denton
1961	Love in a Goldfish Bowl	Gordon Slide
1961	Babes in Toyland	Tom Piper
1962	The Longest Day	U.S. Army Ranger
1964	Ensign Pulver	John X. Bruno
1965	None but the Brave	2nd Lt. Blair
1967	The Violent Ones	Mike Marain

=== Television ===
Year	Title	Role
1957	“The Singin' Idol”, Kraft Television Theatre	as himself
1957	"The Promise", Dick Powell's Zane Grey Theatre	Jace Rawlins
1957	The Ford Show, Starring Tennessee Ernie Ford	as himself
1960	"The Larry Hanify Story", Wagon Train	Larry Hanify
1963	"The Gus Morgan Story", Wagon Train	Ethan Morgan
1963	"Trapped", Laramie	Tad Henderson
1964	Slattery's People	Jed Haskell
1964	Kraft Suspense Theatre	Eddie Riccio
1965	"The Debt", Bonanza	Wiley Kane
1965	“That the Brave Endure”, “Branded”	Bain
1965	Combat!	Private Jim Carey
1968	"No Blue Skies" Hawaii Five-O	Joey Rand
1975	"Hit Gun For Sale" Hawaii Five-0	Joey Cordell
1976	"A Sentence to Steal" Hawaii Five-0	Edward Ross

== Discography ==
=== US singles discography ===
- Love Pains / Transfer – RCA 1953
- Life Is So Lonesome / A Dime and a Dollar – RCA 1954
- Don't Drop It / A Place For Girls Like You – RCA 1954
- Something's Bound To Go Wrong / Kissin' Ain't No Fun – RCA 1955
- Teen-Age Crush / Hep Dee Hootie (Cutie Wootie) – Capitol 1957 (U.S. No. 2, 2 wks.; No. 10 R&B; Cashbox No. 1)
- My Love Song / Ring-A-Ding-Ding – Capitol 1957 No. 62 U.S. A-Side, No. 50 U.S. B-Side
- Love Paris / Don't Drop It – RCA 1957
- Goin' Steady / Ring My Phone – Capitol 1957 No. 16 U.S.
- Let Me Be Loved / Fantastically Foolish – Capitol 1957
- Man, Like Wow! / A Swingin' Romance – Capitol 1957
- Sing Boy Sing / Crazy 'Cause I Love You – Capitol 1957 No. 24 U.S.
- Teen-Age Doll / Hawaiian Rock – Capitol 1958 No. 81 U.S.
- After The Senior Prom / Big Date – Capitol 1958
- Blue Ribbon Baby / I Love You Because – Capitol 1958 No. 50 U.S.
- The Worryin' Kind/Bigger Than Texas – 1958 No. 69 U.S.
- Is It Ever Gonna Happen / I Ain't Gittin' Rid of You – Capitol 1959
- Sinner Man / Bring Me Your Love – Capitol 1959
- I'll Be Seeing You / That's The Way I Am – Capitol 1959 No. 51 U.S.
- You Hold The Future / I Gotta Have You – Capitol 1959
- That's Love / Crossroads – Capitol 1960
- The Old Oaken Bucket / These Are The Things You Are – Capitol 1960 No. 73 U.S. No. 25 U.K.
- On And On / Doctor Heartache – Capitol 1960
- The Parent Trap / Let's Get Together – Buena Vista 1961 (Annette Funicello And Tommy Sands)
- I Love My Baby / Love in a Goldfish Bowl – Capitol 1961
- Remember Me (To Jennie) / Rainbow – Capitol 1961
- Jimmy's Song / Wrong Side of Love – Capitol 1961
- A Young Man's Fancy / Connie – ABC-Paramount 1963
- Only Cause I'm Lonely / Cinderella – ABC-Paramount 1963
- Ten Dollars and a Clean White Shirt / Won't You Be My Girl – ABC-Paramount 1964
- Kisses (Love Theme) / Something More – ABC-Paramount 1964
- Love's Funny / One Rose Today, One Rose Tomorrow – Liberty 1965
- The Statue / Little Rosita – Liberty 1965
- It's The Only One I've Got / As Long As I'm Travellin'- Imperial 1966
- Candy Store Prophet / Second Star to the Left – Imperial 1967
- Seasons in the Sun / Ain't No Big Thing – Superscope 1969

=== U.S. LP discography ===
- Steady Date with Tommy Sands, Capitol 848, 1957
- Sing Boy Sing, Capitol 929, 1958
- Sands Storm, Capitol 1081, 1958
- This Thing Called Love, Capitol 1123, 1959
- When I'm Thinking of You, Capitol 1239, 1959
- Sands at the Sands, Capitol 1364, 1960 (live)
- Dream with Me, Capitol 1426, 1960
- Babes in Toy Land, Buena Vista 3913/4022, 1961 (soundtrack)
- The Parent Trap, Vista 3309, 1961 (soundtrack)
- Seasons in the Sun, Superscope 3A009, 1969
- Tommy Sands, Brunswick BL754216, 1977
