= A Kiss Before Dying (1991 film) =

1991 film by James Dearden

- Theatrical release poster
- Directed by: James Dearden
- Screenplay by: James Dearden
- Based on: A Kiss Before Dying by Ira Levin
- Produced by: Robert Lawrence
- Starring: Matt Dillon; Sean Young; Max von Sydow; Diane Ladd; James Russo
- Cinematography: Mike Southon
- Edited by: Michael Bradsell
- Music by: Howard Shore
- Production companies: Initial Pictures; Kellgate Limited
- Distributed by: Universal Pictures (United States); United International Pictures (United Kingdom)
- Release dates: 26 April 1991 (United States); 14 June 1991 (United Kingdom)
- Running time: 94 minutes
- Countries: United States; United Kingdom
- Language: English
- Budget: $15 million or £8.1 million
- Box office: $15.4 million (US)

A Kiss Before Dying is a 1991 American romantic thriller film directed by James Dearden and based on Ira Levin's 1953 novel of the same name, which won the Edgar Allan Poe Award for Best First Novel. The film stars Matt Dillon, Sean Young, Max von Sydow and Diane Ladd. It follows Jonathan Corliss, an ambitious young man (Dillon) who murders his pregnant girlfriend Dorothy Carlsson and assumes a false identity to seduce her twin sister Ellen, aiming to marry into a wealthy family.

The story was previously adapted into a film of the same name in 1956. The 1991 version was released in the United States on April 26, 1991, and received generally negative reviews from critics.

== Plot ==
A copper refinery owned by Thor Carlsson operates trains that pass by a young boy's home—one who watches them daily from beside the tracks. Decades later, in 1987, Thor's daughter Dorothy, a student at the University of Pennsylvania and heiress to the Carlsson fortune, doodles images of her wedding during a class. Preparing to meet someone at City Hall, she bumps into her friend Patricia Farren, but denies that she is seeing a “mystery man.” At City Hall, Dorothy meets Jonathan Corliss, her secret boyfriend. When the marriage license bureau is closed for lunch, Jonathan takes her to the building's rooftop, where he suddenly pushes her to her death. Before leaving, he takes her engraved lighter and mails a letter she had written. Her body crashes through the skylight and lands in the lobby below.

Dorothy's apparent suicide shocks Thor, and her identical twin sister Ellen. Discovering that Dorothy was pregnant, Thor concludes her death was a suicide brought on by shame. Ellen, however, is skeptical. Jonathan, meanwhile, returns to Pittsburgh, where he lives with his mother and has clippings about the Carlsson family. Promising to make something of himself, he hitchhikes to New York and assumes the identity of Jay Faraday, a drifter whose parents had died on Korean Air Lines Flight 007.

Four months later, Ellen works at Castle House, a shelter in New York. Still investigating Dorothy's death, she contacts Detective Dan Corelli in Philadelphia. She presents Dorothy's wedding sketch, dated the day of her death, and suggests that she was murdered by a boyfriend. Corelli remains unconvinced.

Ellen discovers Dorothy had dated another student prior to her death—Tommy Roussell. When Ellen and Tommy reconnect, he recalls Dorothy had begun dating someone else shortly before her death. While Tommy searches for the man's photo in an old yearbook, Jonathan stalks Ellen from his car. Before Tommy can show Ellen the photo, Jonathan strangles him, forges a suicide note on Tommy's computer, and stages the scene as a suicide confession. Ellen, unaware of Jonathan's deception, believes that Tommy was Dorothy's killer.

Ellen returns to New York and reunites with her boyfriend—now going by Jay Faraday, Jonathan's assumed identity. They grow closer while working together at Castle House, and Jay impresses Thor with his drive. Ellen and Jay marry, and he joins Carlsson Copper. When Patricia remembers the identity of Dorothy's former boyfriend and plans to visit Ellen, Jay intercepts the call. He strangles Patricia in her hotel room, dismembers her body, and dumps it in the East River—all while maintaining the appearance of a normal evening with Ellen.

Later, Dan Corelli, a detective investigating Patricia's disappearance, informs Ellen that her contact information was found in Patricia's diary. Growing suspicious, Ellen verifies that Tommy had been institutionalized at the time of Dorothy's death and again approaches Corelli, though the case remains closed.

While at a bar, Jay is recognized by acquaintance Terry Dieter as Jonathan Corliss. Though he denies it and attacks Terry, the incident unnerves Ellen. She consults a university yearbook and confirms the resemblance. Tracing Jonathan's past, Ellen visits his mother in Pittsburgh, who claims that her son died by suicide, though his body was never found. Inside the home, Ellen finds a suitcase filled with newspaper clippings about her family and Dorothy's lighter.

Jonathan arrives and confesses everything: he killed Faraday and assumed his identity to marry into the Carlsson fortune. Dorothy's pregnancy had threatened his plan, prompting him to kill her. As he attempts to murder Ellen, she escapes to the train tracks outside. During the pursuit, Jonathan is struck and killed by a Carlsson Copper train—at the same spot where he once watched the trains as a boy.

== Cast ==
- Matt Dillon as Jonathan Corliss
  - James Bonfanti as Young Jonathan Corliss
- Sean Young as Ellen Carlsson/Dorothy Carlsson
- Max von Sydow as Thor Carlsson
- Diane Ladd as Mrs. Corliss
- James Russo as Dan Corelli
- Martha Gehman as Patricia Farren
- Joie Lee as Cathy
- Ben Browder as Tommy Roussell
- Sam Coppola as Detective Michaelson
- Elżbieta Czyżewska as Landlady
- Jim Fyfe as Terry Dieter
- Adam Horovitz as Jay Faraday
- Frederick Koehler as Mickey
- Leslie Lyles as Mrs. Roussell
- Shane Rimmer as Commissioner Malley
- Lia Chang as Saleslady
- Lachele Carl as Reporter
- Galaxy Craze as Susie
- Rory Cochrane as Chico

== Production ==
=== Casting ===
The producers of A Kiss Before Dying initially sought River Phoenix for the role of Jonathan Corliss. Phoenix was approached several times with progressively higher offers; however, he declined the part, stating that he did not connect with the material and felt he was unsuitable for the role. The role was subsequently given to Matt Dillon.

Diane Lane and Penelope Ann Miller were both considered for the dual roles of Ellen and Dorothy Carlsson but turned down the opportunity. Bridget Fonda was originally cast in the film; however, she withdrew from the project due to scheduling conflicts. She was replaced by Sean Young.

=== Filming ===
Filming of A Kiss Before Dying began on February 20, 1990, and wrapped on June 5, 1990. The film was primarily shot in Great Britain, with additional scenes filmed in the United States.

British locations included Port Talbot Steelworks, South Glamorgan, Wales (notably the opening sequence was filmed at the Abbey Coke Ovens area, featuring the Main Pumphouse, cooling tower, and water storage towers in the background), Brocket Hall, Welwyn Garden City, Hertfordshire, Gaddesden Place, Hemel Hempstead, Hertfordshire, Lee International Studios, Shepperton, Surrey and various locations in London. United States locations included Charlottesville, Virginia, New York City and Philadelphia.

=== Distribution ===
A Kiss Before Dying was released widely in the United States on April 26, 1991, and later premiered in England on June 14, 1991. Despite the wide release, the film underperformed at the box office. It grossed $4,348,165 in its opening week, with total receipts reaching $14,478,720 over a four-week run. The film was in wide release for 31 days, shown in as many as 1,546 theatres across the country at its peak.

== Reception ==
On the review aggregator Rotten Tomatoes, the film holds an approval rating of 36% based on 14 reviews. Metacritic, which uses a weighted average, assigned the film a score of 40 out of 100, based on 26 critics, indicating "mixed or average" reviews. According to CinemaScore, audiences gave the film an average grade of "C+" on an A+ to F scale.

Chicago Sun-Times film critic Roger Ebert praised the film's direction and Matt Dillon's performance, writing, "This is Matt Dillon's first film since Drugstore Cowboy (1989), and demonstrates again that he is one of the best actors working in movies. He possesses the secret of not giving too much, of not trying so hard that we're distracted by his performance... [and director] Dearden helps it work because he doesn't press his point."

In contrast, Peter Travers of Rolling Stone gave the film a negative review, particularly in comparison to the 1956 original adaptation. He criticized the screenplay and direction, stating: "Though Dearden gets the surface right – the movie looks sleek – he skimps on characterization... [and] Dearden's script fails to provide the raw material that would let him go beyond the stereotype... Dearden merely walks the cast through a gauntlet of film noir clichés."

Sean Young won both the Golden Raspberry Award for Worst Actress and Golden Raspberry Award for Worst Supporting Actress for her dual roles at the 12th Golden Raspberry Awards.

== Comparisons to novel ==
While the film retains the core elements of the character Bud Corliss—renamed Jonathan in the adaptation—it makes several significant departures from Ira Levin's original 1953 novel.

In the film, Jonathan fakes his own suicide after murdering Dorothy and later reappears under the alias Jay Faraday in order to romance and marry Dorothy's sister Ellen. In the novel, Corliss does not assume a new identity following the murder. Additionally, Ellen's other sister, Marion, who plays a role in the novel, does not appear in either the 1991 adaptation or the 1956 film version.

The character of Leo Kingship's employee, Gordon Gant, is also altered. In the novel, Gant is a schoolmate of Dorothy's who turns sleuth after Ellen suspects him of the murder; in this adaptation, he is reimagined as Dan Corelli (James Russo), a homicide detective who had previously investigated Dorothy's death.

The film concludes with a different ending than the novel. After Ellen uncovers Jonathan's true identity, he attempts to kill her. During the chase, he is fatally struck by one of her father Thor (Max von Sydow)'s trains—an ending crafted for dramatic and ironic effect.

== Adaptation ==
- Baazigar (1993), an unofficial remake in India by director Abbas–Mustan, starring Shah Rukh Khan, Kajol in lead and Shilpa Shetty, Dalip Tahil and Siddharth in supporting roles.
