= A Kiss Before Dying (1956 film) =

1956 film by Gerd Oswald

- theatrical release poster
- Directed by: Gerd Oswald
- Screenplay by: Lawrence Roman
- Based on: A Kiss Before Dying (1953 novel) by Ira Levin
- Produced by: Robert L. Jacks
- Starring: Robert Wagner; Jeffrey Hunter; Virginia Leith; Joanne Woodward; Mary Astor
- Cinematography: Lucien Ballard
- Edited by: George A. Gittens
- Music by: Lionel Newman
- Production company: Crown Productions
- Distributed by: United Artists
- Release dates: April 20, 1956 (London); June 12, 1956 (United States); July 18, 1956 (Los Angeles); August 1, 1956 (New York)
- Running time: 94 minutes
- Country: United States
- Language: English

A Kiss Before Dying is a 1956 American color film noir directed by Gerd Oswald in his directorial debut. The screenplay was written by Lawrence Roman based on Ira Levin's 1953 novel of the same name, which won the 1954 Edgar Award for Best First Novel. The film stars Robert Wagner, Jeffrey Hunter, Virginia Leith, Mary Astor and Joanne Woodward in one of her first film roles. It was remade in 1991 under the same title.

== Plot ==
University student Bud Corliss is wooing fellow student Dorothy Kingship solely for her father's mining fortune. When Bud discovers that Dorothy is pregnant with his child, he realizes that she will be disinherited by her father, Leo Kingship. However, Dorothy does not care about losing the fortune, as she feels free of her father's control for the first time in her life. Bud assures Dorothy that he will take care of her, but Dorothy insists on marrying, to which he reluctantly agrees.

Bud spends the days before the wedding formulating an elaborate plan to poison Dorothy with arsenic and create the appearance that she has committed suicide. He is agitated when this plan fails because he has already mailed a letter to her sister Ellen, a letter which he had tricked her into writing. However, he soon comes up with another idea; on the day of the wedding, Bud lures Dorothy to the top of a building and pushes her to her death. The letter is received and accepted, as Bud intended, as a suicide note.

After several months, Bud is dating Dorothy's sister, Ellen, and is trying again to ingratiate himself with Leo Kingship. Ellen is unaware of Bud's relationship with Dorothy, but she has always harbored doubts about her sister's suicide. She realizes that if she can discover the identity of her sister's boyfriend, he might be the killer. For help, Ellen contacts Gordon Grant, who had tutored Dorothy. Ellen soon believes that she has identified the boyfriend, Dwight Powell. Bud learns of the investigation and shoots Powell, whose death is also taken to be a suicide.

Ellen is satisfied that Powell was the man who killed Dorothy, and she and Bud become engaged. Grant appears at the engagement party to tell her that he has discovered that Powell could not have committed the crime. While driving home, Grant stops at a phone booth to call his uncle, the chief of police, and tells him that he had seen Bud with Dorothy at the university. Grant returns to Ellen's place and informs Leo that he is certain that Bud was dating Dorothy and is likely her murderer. Ellen rejects the idea.

The next morning, Bud and Ellen drive to the Kingship mine. Meanwhile, Gordon's uncle confirms that Bud was indeed Dorothy's boyfriend. Bud reveals more knowledge about the mine than he should, considering that he has only talked with Ellen about her family. He also reveals that he had frequented concerts in the university town at the same time that Dorothy did so. He admits to Ellen that he had dated Dorothy and says that he was being considerate of her emotions by keeping it a secret. They argue, and Bud moves to the edge of the open mine pit. When he references Dorothy as "Dorrie", a name that only he had called her, it becomes obvious to Ellen that he is guilty. Her father and Grant arrive and witness Bud struggling to throw Ellen into the pit. In a desperate attempt to kill her, Bud shoves her in front of an oncoming truck, but the truck swerves and instead hits him, sending him over the edge of the mine to his death.

== Cast ==
- Robert Wagner as Bud Corliss
- Jeffrey Hunter as Gordon Grant
- Virginia Leith as Ellen Kingship
- Joanne Woodward as Dorothy Kingship
- Mary Astor as Mrs. Corliss
- George Macready as Leo Kingship
- Robert Quarry as Dwight Powell
- Howard Petrie as Howard Chesser, chief of police
- Molly McCart as Annabelle Koch

== Production ==
Darryl F. Zanuck bought the rights to the book in August 1953, following the bidding of many studios, and announced Robert Wagner as the male lead. The role of Dwight Powell, played in the film by Robert Quarry, was initially to be played by Martin Milner, but Milner withdrew because of schedule changes.

In 1955, it was announced that the film would be made by Crown Productions and distributed by United Artists. Wagner, Joanne Woodward and Jeffrey Hunter were loaned to United Artists by Twentieth Century-Fox. The film was the directorial debut of Gerd Oswald.

In an interview with the American Legends website, Robert Wagner recalled what it was like to work with Oswald, who some regard as unfairly neglected by film critics: "We rehearsed a lot, but when it was set, it was pretty well set. There was not a lot of improvisation. Gerd was very loyal to the story, but was always looking for ways to make it better. He was a very creative man, into texture, backlighting."

Location filming occurred in Tucson, Arizona.

The film's use of the word "pregnant" caused controversy, and it was removed for the film's preview run in Chicago. United Artists was prohibited to use the word in any advertising.

== Reception ==
Critic Philip K. Scheuer of the Los Angeles Times wrote a blistering indictment of the film's depiction of "mental cruelty":

I felt offended, even outraged; and ever since, I have been trying to figure out why. ... What bothered me so, I have decided, was the mental cruelty involved. And this is something rather new in pictures—the calculated, drawn-out, gloatingly sadistic torture of the mind. ... [M]ost moviemakers have sensed instinctively where to "draw the line." I cannot define "the line" precisely, but it has to do with using the art of suggestion—the "cutting away" to something else—to convey what should not be shown, and with the difference between good taste and bad taste. But what, precisely, should not be shown? You have your breaking point, I have mine. I only know that those two sequences in "A Kiss Before Dying" struck me personally as being beyond the pale and, in my capacity of reviewer, as being potentially harmful and pernicious for indiscriminate general viewing, particularly by teen-agers. But why single out this film? I think perhaps because the situations depicted, especially the first, were so real, so intimate, and involved such clean-cut American types. I think that I—and others—can take most of the other kinds of "suspense" in our stride, provided that they are conceived in: (1) the objective newsreel or documentary technique or (2) as frankly "horror" stories. The distinction is a fine one, but it is there.

In a contemporary review for The Boston Globe, critic Cyrus Durgin wrote: "It seems to me that director Oswald, though he has his own notions of camera angles and scene detail, never got as much out of his competent actors as he ought to have done. None of the characters strikes me as real, none has much human warmth. It is as if they were suspended in a vacuum of unreality."

Reviewer Mildred Martin of The Philadelphia Inquirer wrote: "Endless gabble coupled with slow-motion directing dissipate whatever suspense might ordinarily be suspected ... By the time arsenic fails and the girl gets pushed off the roof of a 12-story building, all one can do is settle down to an endurance test. For dullness gives way to the idiotically preposterous."

Variety commented: "This multiple-murder story is an offbeat sort of film, with Robert Wagner portraying a calculating youth who intends to allow nothing to stand in his way to money ... Gerd Oswald's restrained direction suits the mood ... Wagner registers in killer role. Woodward is particularly good as the pregnant girl, and Virginia Leith acceptable as her sister. Jeffrey Hunter is lost as a part-time university professor responsible for the final solution of the crimes. Mary Astor and George Macready are okay as Wagner's mother and the girls' father."

== Remake ==
An adaptation directed by James Dearden was produced in 1991 using the same title. Called "insanely inept" and "bereft of suspense" by Entertainment Weekly, the film earned two Razzie awards. The film was unofficially remade in Malayalam as Moonilonnu (1996), and in Hindi as Baazigar (1993), starring Shah Rukh Khan.

== See also ==
- List of American films of 1956
