= Teen-Age Crush =

Single by Tommy Sands
- B-side: "Hep Dee Hootie (Cutie Wootie)"
- Released: February 1, 1957
- Genre: Rockabilly
- Length: 2:29
- Label: Capitol
- Songwriters: Audrey Allison, Joe Allison

Tommy Sands singles chronology
"Something's Bound to Go Wrong" (1955)	"Teen-Age Crush" (1957)	"My Love Song" (1957)

"Teen-Age Crush" is a song written by Audrey Allison and Joe Allison and performed by Tommy Sands. It reached #2 on the U.S. pop chart and #10 on the U.S. R&B chart in 1957.

The song ranked #33 on Billboard's Year-End top 50 singles of 1957.

Sands is accompanied on the recording by the vocal group the Jordanaires.

== Other versions ==
- Country artist Rita Robbins was the first to record the song for RCA Victor in 1956, but it did not chart.
- Barry Frank released a version of the song as a single in 1957, but like his other covers of popular hits of the day released by Bell Records, then a budget label, it did not chart.
- Gary Paxton released a version of the song as a single in 1962, but it did not chart.
- Ray Whitley released a version of the song as a single in 1963, but it did not chart.
