= Rosemary's Baby =

Rosemary's Baby may refer to:

- Rosemary's Baby (novel), a 1967 horror novel by Ira Levin
  - Rosemary's Baby (film), a 1968 horror film based on the novel
    - Look What's Happened to Rosemary's Baby, a 1976 made-for-television sequel film
  - Rosemary's Baby (miniseries), a 2014 horror television miniseries based on the novel
- "Rosemary's Baby" (30 Rock), an episode of the television series 30 Rock
