= The Boys from Brazil =

The Boys from Brazil may refer to:

- The Boys from Brazil (novel), a 1976 novel by Ira Levin
  - The Boys from Brazil (film), a 1978 film based on the novel, starring Gregory Peck, Laurence Olivier and James Mason
  - The Boys from Brazil (miniseries), an upcoming miniseries based on the novel
- The Boys from Brazil: Rise of the Bolsonaros, a 2022 BBC documentary series
