= Look What's Happened to Rosemary's Baby =

1976 American made-for-television film

- Official release poster
- Based on: Rosemary's Baby by Ira Levin
- Written by: Anthony Wilson
- Directed by: Sam O'Steen
- Starring: Broderick Crawford; Patty Duke; Ruth Gordon; Tina Louise; George Maharis; Stephen McHattie; Ray Milland; Donna Mills
- Music by: Charles Bernstein
- Country of origin: United States
- Original language: English

Production
- Producer: Anthony Wilson
- Production locations: Paramount Studios - 5555 Melrose Avenue, Hollywood, Los Angeles, California
- Cinematography: John A. Alonzo
- Editor: Bob Wyman
- Camera setup: Panaflex Camera and Lenses by Panavision
- Running time: 100 minutes
- Production companies: Paramount Television; The Culzean Corporation

Original release
- Network: ABC
- Release: October 29, 1976

Related
- Rosemary's Baby (film); Rosemary's Baby (miniseries)

Look What's Happened to Rosemary's Baby is a 1976 American made-for-television horror film, which serves as the sequel to Roman Polanski's 1968 film Rosemary's Baby, and the second installment in the franchise of the same name. The movie stars Stephen McHattie, Patty Duke, George Maharis, Ruth Gordon, Ray Milland and Tina Louise; premiering as the ABC Friday Night Movie on October 29, 1976.

The film has little connection to the 1967 novel by Ira Levin, on which the first film was based. It is not related to Levin's 1997 sequel novel, Son of Rosemary, although there are some similarities (e.g. the child in both stories is called Andrew/Andy).

The only actor to return from the first film is Ruth Gordon as Minnie Castevet. Sam O'Steen, an editor on the first movie, directed this sequel. Patty Duke, who plays Rosemary Woodhouse, was considered for the role in the 1968 film that ultimately went to Mia Farrow.

The film follows Andrew "Adrian" Woodhouse from the age of 8 to the birth of his own first child. The would-be Antichrist finds himself constantly manipulated by members of his family and by a newfound love interest Ellen Castevet.

== Plot ==
=== The Book of Rosemary ===
The coven prepares for a ritual, only to discover that Adrian Woodhouse, Rosemary's baby, now eight years old, is missing from his room. Knowing Rosemary must be responsible for this, the coven members use her personal possessions to enable the forces of evil to locate her. Rosemary and Adrian are hiding in a synagogue for shelter. While there, supernatural events begin to affect the rabbis. However, as they are seeking sanctuary in a house of God, the coven cannot affect them.

The next morning, Rosemary's husband Guy, now a famous movie star, gets a call from Roman Castevet. Roman says that both Rosemary and Adrian are missing and that she may attempt to contact Guy. Later that night, Rosemary and Adrian are sheltering in a bus stop. Rosemary calls Guy, issuing instructions on how to send her money. Outside, local children start teasing Adrian and bullying him by stealing his toy car. Furious, Adrian knocks the children unconscious. After hearing all the noise, Rosemary hangs up the telephone and runs outside to find Adrian. Attempting to flee, the pair is accosted by Marjean Dorn, a prostitute who was a witness to the incident. Marjean offers to hide the pair in her trailer.

Rosemary eventuallly asks Marjean to go see what had happened with the children. After returning, Marjean lies to Rosemary that two boys were killed. Marjean is actually a follower of Roman and his wife Minnie, but offers to help Rosemary get a ride on a bus to escape. After a bus arrives later that night, Rosemary enters and the doors slam shut behind her before Adrian can get on. Rosemary turns to the driver, only to discover that the bus is empty and is driving itself. Marjean holds Adrian in her arms as he sees the possessed bus take Rosemary away.

=== The Book of Adrian ===
Over 20 years later, an adult Adrian and his best friend, Peter Simon, are detained by police for speeding. When Adrian arrives at his home, which is his "Aunt" Marjean's cheap casino, she confronts him about his reckless behavior. Marjean says that she is always worried about him ever since his parents were "killed in an automobile accident". Adrian then decides to go take a joyride and instigates a fight with a gang of violent bikers. Peter finds Adrian, who mentions what happened and how he has been suffering from nightmares and violent urges.

Later that night, Roman and Minnie arrive at the casino pretending to be Adrian's aunt and uncle. As they prepare for his birthday party, Minnie drugs Adrian into unconsciousness and dresses him up in a costume and devil makeup. Peter, who notices something is wrong, becomes even more suspicious when he sees the movie star Guy arriving. After Guy and Roman join the rest of the coven, they begin to chant, attempting to invoke Satan. Although it initially seems as though the ritual failed, Adrian is possessed and runs out on the casino's dance floor. Roman soon realizes that Satan is using Adrian to possess all of the innocent people on the dance floor. Guy becomes frightened and runs away. Peter intercepts Guy and attempts to make him help save Adrian. Guy panics when Peter struggles with him, so he electrocutes Peter with a broken power cord.

=== The Book of Andrew ===
Adrian regains consciousness with amnesia in a hospital. He is kept there against his will, as his fingerprints match the set that the police found on the broken power cord used to kill Peter. Nurse Ellen tells him his name is "Adrian"; however, he insists his name is "Andrew", because he remembers his mother calling him "Andrew". Not knowing if Ellen will believe him or not, he is hesitant about mentioning what he remembers about the cult. Ellen does believe him and helps him escape. When notified of Andrew's escape from the hospital, Guy fears a furious Andrew may follow him and kill him.

On the run, Andrew and Ellen stop at a motel, where she seduces him. She then admits that she is a cult member, and she drugs and rapes him. He falls asleep having a nightmare of Ellen as a type of harpy that tears at his chest. When Andrew later wakes up and goes outside looking for Ellen, a speeding car tries to run him down. Andrew gets out of the way; however, Ellen is hit. The car crashes, killing the driver, who Andrew discovers was Guy. Confused and scared, Andrew runs away into the night.

Roman and Minnie later sit in the waiting room of a hospital to visit their pregnant granddaughter. After Dr. Lister informs them that the pregnancy should continue as normal, their granddaughter is revealed to be Ellen, who survived her injuries. Ellen eventually gives birth.

== Cast ==
- Stephen McHattie as Andrew "Adrian" Woodhouse
  - Philip Boyer as young Adrian Woodhouse
- Patty Duke as Rosemary Woodhouse
- Broderick Crawford as Sheriff Holtzman
- Ruth Gordon as Minnie Castevet
- Lloyd Haynes as Laykin
- David Huffman as Peter Simon
- Tina Louise as Marjean Dorn
- George Maharis as Guy Woodhouse
- Ray Milland as Roman Castevet
- Donna Mills as Ellen Castevet
- Beverly Sanders as Columnist
- Brian Richards as Dr. Lister

== Reception ==
Daniel Goodwin, writing for Scream magazine, criticized the film's disjointed chase and dance sequences, acting, and production aesthetics. Although he considered the first half particularly weak, he found the second half more entertaining, while judging the film substantially inferior to Polanski's original.

== See also ==
- List of films about witchcraft
