= Breach of Conduct =

- Genre: Thriller
- Written by: Scott Abbott
- Directed by: Tim Matheson
- Starring: Peter Coyote; Courtney Thorne-Smith
- Music by: Terry Plumeri
- Country of origin: United States
- Original language: English

Production
- Executive producer: Tim Matheson
- Producers: Sheldon Pinchuk; Lori-Etta Taub
- Cinematography: Gideon Porath
- Editor: Christopher Rouse
- Running time: 93 minutes
- Production company: Victor Television Productions

Original release
- Release: December 1, 1994

Breach of Conduct, also known as Tour of Duty, is a 1994 American thriller television film directed by Tim Matheson and written by Scott Abbott. It starred Peter Coyote and Courtney Thorne-Smith.

== Cast ==
- Peter Coyote as Col. Andrew Case
- Courtney Thorne-Smith as Helen Lutz
- Keith Amos as Cpl. Reed
- Beth Toussaint as Paula Waite
- Tom Verica as Lt. Ted Lutz
- Thom Vernon as Cpl. Weingart
- Tom Mason as Dr. Matthew James
- Todd McKee as Lt. Keith Waite
- Drew Snyder as Sheriff
- Tom McFadden as Deputy sheriff
- John Walcutt as Gate guard Harper
- Gregg Daniel as Military police officer
- Bill Harper as Military police officer
- Roger Hewlett as Gatehouse guard
- Sharon Mendel as Gatehouse guard
- Larry Nash as Squad leader
- Michael Raysses as Soldier in truck
- Tudi Roche as Enlisted woman
- Stan Foster as Army clerk
- Gina St. John as Nurse
- Joe Camareno as Waiter
- Shayne Adamson as Corpsman
