= Apartment 7A =

2024 film by Natalie Erika James

- Release poster
- Directed by: Natalie Erika James
- Screenplay by: Natalie Erika James; Christian White; Skylar James
- Story by: Skylar James
- Based on: Rosemary's Baby by Ira Levin
- Produced by: John Krasinski; Allyson Seeger; Michael Bay; Andrew Form; Brad Fuller
- Starring: Julia Garner; Dianne Wiest; Jim Sturgess; Kevin McNally
- Cinematography: Arnau Valls Colomer
- Edited by: Andy Canny
- Music by: Adam Price; Peter Gregson
- Production companies: Paramount Players; Platinum Dunes; Sunday Night Productions
- Distributed by: Paramount Pictures
- Release dates: September 20, 2024 (Fantastic Fest); September 27, 2024 (United States)
- Running time: 104 minutes
- Country: United States
- Language: English

Apartment 7A is a 2024 American psychological horror film serving as a prequel to Rosemary's Baby (1968). Directed and co-written by Natalie Erika James, the film stars Julia Garner, Dianne Wiest, Jim Sturgess, and Kevin McNally. The story sees a young dancer who, after suffering an injury that risks her career, receives help from a Broadway producer and an older couple with sinister ulterior motives.

Apartment 7A had its premiere at Fantastic Fest on September 20, 2024, before being released simultaneously on Paramount+ and on digital video on demand on September 27. The film received mixed reviews by the critics, who praised the atmosphere and the acting, but criticized the script.

== Plot ==
New York City dancer Terry Gionoffrio sustains a serious ankle injury mid-performance in a Broadway production. Now known as "the girl who fell," she auditions unsuccessfully for dancing parts. She follows Broadway producer Alan Marchand home to the Bramford apartment building, where she falls ill from her pain medication. Elderly Bramford residents Minnie and Roman Castevet befriend her and offer her a rent-free apartment. While unpacking, she finds a jazz shoe labeled with the name Joan Cebulski.

The Castevets invite her for cocktails at Alan's apartment, but she discovers the Castevets have backed out and she is the only guest. She has a drink and becomes disoriented. After a frightening dream, she wakes in bed in Marchand's apartment. He implies they had sex and says she made the chorus for his show.

Another neighbor, Lily Gardenia, gives Terry a salve for her ankle, and she has another frightening dream, but in the morning her ankle is markedly better. The Castevets give her a talisman necklace for Christmas.

Terry visits her neighbor Dr. Sapirstein, an obstetrician, and learns she is pregnant. The Castevets persuade her to let them raise the baby so she can focus on her career. She is cast in the lead role after her rival suffers a twisted ankle, apparently caused by an unseen force.

Lily attacks Terry one night, insisting she "has to end it," then suffers a heart attack. The next day, the Castevets tell Terry that Lily is in a coma.

Terry discovers a secret passageway into Lily's apartment and finds a grimoire containing images of her talisman and a chained woman giving birth to a demon. She steals it.

Experiencing pain, Terry calls Dr. Sapirstein. He tells her to pack a bag and come in, as she may be experiencing perinatal hysteria and should be admitted for the protection of herself and the baby.

Terry flees, leaving the talisman behind. Finding Joan Cebulski's name in an old Playbill, she visits the theater; the manager says Joan left six months earlier, promising to retrieve her belongings the next day. In Joan's suitcase, Terry finds a rosary and a Bible with Revelation 12:9 underlined; when she handles the rosary, its cross burns her hand. A nun reveals that Joan had been subjected to "ungodly things", and was being chased when she ran into an oncoming bus, killing her. The nun fearfully warns that something terrible will happen if Terry's baby is born.

At a back-alley abortionist, Terry involuntarily kicks the abortionist, who has a seizure. Terry says she must deal with the pregnancy alone.

At the Bramford, Terry finds a temple with ritual tools in a sub-basement. Alan taunts her, saying this is where she was impregnated. She stabs him with an athame. A horned figure appears. She flees to her apartment and tries to stab herself in the stomach but falls to the floor, writhing in pain. Roman tells Terry her son will be Satan's heir and change the world. He and Minnie take her to a group, who welcome her. Minnie replaces the talisman around Terry's neck, and Roman declares God dead and 1965 to be year one. He raises a toast to Satan, which Terry joins. She dances to the window and throws herself out to her death.

As Minnie and Roman approach the crime scene, they see Rosemary and Guy Woodhouse being interviewed by police, and the Castevets smile at each other. (Note: As depicted in Rosemary's Baby (1968).)

== Cast ==
- Julia Garner as Terry Gionoffrio, an ambitious dancer who moves into the Bramford apartment (Note: The character also appears in the 1968 film, where she is portrayed by Angela Dorian.)
- Dianne Wiest as Minnie Castevet, Terry's nosy neighbor (Note: The character also appears in the 1968 film, where she is portrayed by Ruth Gordon.)
- Jim Sturgess as Alan Marchand, a Broadway producer who casts Terry in his show
- Kevin McNally as Roman Castevet, Minnie's husband (Note: The character also appears in the 1968 film, where he is portrayed by Sidney Blackmer.)
- Marli Siu as Annie Leung, Terry's friend
- Andrew Buchan as Leo Watts, a Broadway director
- Rosy McEwen as Vera Clarke, Terry's rival and a dancer
- Tina Gray as Mrs. Gardenia, Terry's neighbor and a New York state judge
- Patrick Lyster as Dr. Sapirstein, Terry's neighbor and obstetrician (Note: The character also appears in the 1968 film, where he is portrayed by Ralph Bellamy.)
- Kobna Holdbrook-Smith as BJ, a theater manager
- Patricia Jones as Sister Claire, a nun
- James Swanton as Satan

In addition, Amy Leeson and Scott Hume appear as married couple Rosemary and Guy Woodhouse, respectively. (Note: The characters also appear in the 1968 film, where they are portrayed by Mia Farrow and John Cassavetes.)

== Production ==
=== Development ===
In 2008, a remake of Rosemary's Baby (1968)—the film adaptation of Ira Levin's 1967 novel—was in development from producers Michael Bay, Andrew Form, and Brad Fuller. It fell through later that year.

In March 2021, it was reported Natalie Erika James would direct the psychological thriller film Apartment 7A. James co-wrote the screenplay with Christian White, based on a previous draft of the script written by Skylar James. John Krasinski, Allyson Seeger, Bay, Form and Fuller produced the film, which was a joint-venture production between Paramount Players, Sunday Night Productions, and Platinum Dunes. Following the success of the A Quiet Place franchise, the project was among several scripts that the studio was developing with a similar tone. Apartment 7A was chosen from those projects to quickly enter pre-production.

=== Casting ===
In January 2022, Julia Garner was revealed to be starring in the leading role. In March, Dianne Wiest joined the cast. By the time filming had ended, additional casting announcements included Marli Siu, Rosy McEwen, Jim Sturgess, Kevin McNally, Andrew Buchan and Kobna Holdbrook-Smith.

=== Filming ===
Principal photography began in London on March 15, 2022. On June 4, it was announced that filming had wrapped. Later that month, Bloody Disgusting reported that the film was secretly a prequel to Rosemary's Baby. In August, the Writers Guild of America determined the film's final writing credits and confirmed it to be based on Levin's novel. Reshoots took place in April and May 2023.

== Release ==
Apartment 7A premiered at Fantastic Fest on September 20, 2024, before being simultaneously released in the United States via video-on-demand and on Paramount+ on September 27. The film was released on DVD separately and as part of a "2 Movie Collection" along with Rosemary's Baby on November 5, 2024.

== Reception ==
On the review aggregator website Rotten Tomatoes, 45% of 89 critics' reviews are positive. The website's consensus reads: "Apartment 7A is slickly assembled and solidly acted, but the lingering memory of Rosemary's Baby and a predictable prequel template make for a sub(par)lease." Metacritic, which uses a weighted average, assigned the film a score of 49 out of 100, based on 19 critics, indicating "mixed or average" reviews.

John Anderson of The Wall Street Journal called it "a highly stylish effort at recycling". Writing for IGN Movies, Katie Rife noted that "although the film’s themes and horror are rote, creative choreography and strong performances from the core cast make it an entertaining watch". The film was also praised by Robert Englund.
