= Gina St. John =

American actress

Gina St. John (born in Natchez, Mississippi, USA) is an American actress and entertainment reporter, active since 1994. She was born in August 1963.

== Biography ==
She was once a radio presenter in Roanoke, Virginia and Cleveland, Ohio WPHR AND WMJI. She has hosted shows including CNET Central and E! News Daily (1997–2008), and has had roles in television dramas such as Crossing Jordan, NCIS and Commander in Chief. In 2000 she became a game show host, with the Lifetime game show Who Knows You Best?.

== Filmography ==
=== Films ===
Film
Year	Title	Role
1995	Children of the Corn III: Urban Harvest	Diane
2000	King of the Open Mics	Nicole
2003	Bruce Almighty	Newscaster
2004	Outpost (Video short)	Commander Maxwell
2005	Instant Dads	Anna
2005	XXX: State of the Union	Field Reporter
2005	Circuit Riders (Short)	Gina
2007	Expired	Woman with Expired Meter
2008	Prom Night	Reporter
2009	Fist of the Warrior	Det. Georgette Wilson
2009	Hotel for Dogs	Female Reporter
2009	Nine Dead	Anchor-woman
2019	The Christmas Cabin	Octavia

=== TV ===
Television
Year	Title	Role	Notes
1994	Breach of Conduct	Nurse	(TV Movie)
1995	Burke's Law	Ellen	(TV Series), 1 episode: "Who Killed the Centerfold?"
1995	Cagney & Lacey: Together Again	Gail	(TV Movie)
1996 – 1999	CNet Central	Host	(TV Series)
1998	The Steve Harvey Show	Leah Love	(TV Series), 1 episode: "What You Won't Cue for Love"
2000 – 2001	Who Knows You Best?	Host	(TV Series)
2002	Boomtown	Reporter #1	(TV Series), 1 episode: Pilot
2002	For Your Love	Alicia	(TV Series), 1 episode: "The Odd Couples"
2002	The District	Nurse	(TV Series), 1 episode: "Convictions"
2002	House Blend	Linda (uncredited)	(TV Short)
2002	Sabrina the Teenage Witch	Kerry	(TV Series), 1 episode: "Guilty!"
2002	One on One	Sonya	(TV Series), 1 episode: "The Way You Make Me Feel"
2003	Miss Match	Marla's Attorney	(TV Series), 1 episode: "Who's Your Daddy?"
2003	Monk	Second Reporter	(TV Series), 1 episode: "Mr. Monk Goes to the Ballgame"
2003	Miracles	Felicia Phelps	(TV Series), 1 episode: "The Friendly Skies"
2004	The D.A.	Debra Hoyt	(TV Series), 1 episode: "The People vs. Patricia Henry"
2005-2008	NCIS (TV Series)	ZNN Reporter Cindy Ames	(TV Series), 2 episodes: "Black Water" (2005) and "Nine Lives" (2008)
2005	Joey	Susan Walters	(TV Series), 1 episode: "Joey and the House"
2005	Joan of Arcadia	Reporter #2 / Professional Reporter #2	(TV Series), 2 episodes: "Trial and Error" and "The Rise & Fall of Joan Girardi"
2005	Grounded for Life	Saleslady	(TV Series), 1 episode: "The Letter(s)"
2006-2007	CSI: NY	Reporter #1	(TV Series), 2 episodes: "Not What It Looks Like" (2006) and "Snow Day" (2007)
2006	Secrets of a Small Town	Anchor	(TV Series), 1 episode: Pilot
2006	The Nine	Female Host	(TV Series), 1 episode: "Heroes Welcome"
2006	Commander in Chief	Newscaster / Newscaster Morgan / Local News Anchor	(TV Series), 4 episodes
2006	Las Vegas	TV Newscaster	(TV Series), 1 episode: "The Bitch Is Back"
2006	Murder 101	1st Hospitality Reporter	(TV Series), 1 episode
2007-2011	Medium	Reporter or Newscaster	(TV Series), 5 episodes
2007	Ugly Betty	Newscaster	(TV Series), 1 episode: "I See Me, I.C.U."
2007	The Game	Reporter #2	(TV Series), 1 episode: "Media Blitz"
2007	Without a Trace	Reporter	(TV Series), 1 episode: "Baggage"
2007	Studio 60 on the Sunset Strip	Reporter #1	(TV Series), 1 episode: "K&R: Part 2"
2007	Crossing Jordan	Reporter / News Anchor / Newscaster	(TV Series), 3 episodes; "Dead Again", "Faith" and "33 Bullets"
2009	Heroes	Reporter	(TV Series), 1 episode: Chapter Six "Shades of Gray"
2010	CSI: Miami	Reporter #1	(TV Series), 1 episode: "All Fall Down"
2011	Criminal Minds	Reporter	(TV Series), 1 episode: "Dorado Falls"
2011	Modern Family	Principal Kaizler	(TV Series), 1 episode: "See You Next Fall"
2012	Malibu Country	Reporter	(TV Series), 1 episode: Pilot
2012	Shake It Up	Reporter	(TV Series), 3 episodes; "Embarrass It Up", "Protest It Up" and "Split It Up"
2014	Scorpion	Newscaster	(TV Series), 1 episode: "A Cyclone"
2014	Love Experiment	Dr. Lewis	(TV Series), 1 episode
2015	Gladiator Recharge	Beck	(TV Movie)
2015	Baby Daddy	Flight Attendant	(TV Series), 1 episode: "She Loves Me, She Loves Me Note"
2016	Jane the Virgin	E.R. Doctor	(TV Series), 1 episode: "Chapter Forty-Three"
2017	Superior Donuts	Patron #1	(TV Series), 1 episode: "Art for Art's Sake"
2017-2018	K.C. Undercover	Newscaster / Reporter	(TV Series), 2 episodes: "Out of the Water and Into the Fire" (2017) and "K.C. Times Three" (2018)
2019	No Good Nick	Wine Taster #2	(TV Series), 1 episode: "The Pig in a Poke"
