= Winchell (film) =

1998 television film directed by Paul Mazursky

- Based on: Winchell, His Life and Times by Herman Klurfeld
- Written by: Scott Abbott
- Directed by: Paul Mazursky
- Starring: Stanley Tucci; Glenne Headly; Paul Giamatti; Xander Berkeley; Kevin Tighe; Christopher Plummer
- Composer: Bill Conti
- Country of origin: United States
- Original language: English

Production
- Executive producer: Robert N. Fried
- Producer: Stan Wlodkowski
- Cinematography: Robbie Greenberg
- Editor: Stuart H. Pappé
- Running time: 108 minutes
- Production companies: Fried Films; HBO Pictures

Original release
- Network: HBO
- Release: November 21, 1998

Winchell is a 1998 American biographical drama television film about the life of Walter Winchell, directed by Paul Mazursky and written by Scott Abbott. The film is based on the 1976 book Winchell, His Life and Times by Herman Klurfeld. It stars Stanley Tucci as Walter Winchell, with Glenne Headly, Paul Giamatti, Xander Berkeley, Kevin Tighe, and Christopher Plummer in supporting roles.

The film won three Primetime Emmy Awards, including Outstanding Lead Actor in a Miniseries or Movie for Tucci, who also received a Golden Globe Award and a Screen Actors Guild Award nomination for his performance.

== Premise ==
The film follows Walter Winchell from his early days as a tabloid gossip columnist to his rise as he takes on the United States' most powerful propagandist.

== Cast ==
- Stanley Tucci as Walter Winchell
- Glenne Headly as Dallas Wayne (Note: A fictionalized version of Winchell's confidante Texas Guinan.)
- Paul Giamatti as Herman Klurfeld
- Xander Berkeley as Gavreau
- Kevin Tighe as William Randolph Hearst
- Christopher Plummer as Franklin D. Roosevelt
- Frank Medrano as Melvin Diamond
- Vic Polizos as Sam Hague
- John F. O'Donohue as Harry
- Michael Greene as Bellamy
- Rod McCary as Emcee
- Victoria Platt as Josephine Baker
- Paula Cale as Mrs. Klurfeld
- Jason Huber as Ed Sullivan
- Paul Jenkins as Lawrence Newman
- Paul Mazursky as Winchell's Father
- Megan Mullally as June Winchell
- Mary Portser as Janet Winchell

== Awards and nominations ==
Year	Award	Category	Recipient(s)	Result
1999	13th American Society of Cinematographers Awards	Outstanding Achievement in Cinematography in Movies of the Week, Pilots or Miniseries	Robbie Greenberg	Won
1999	3rd Art Directors Guild Awards	Excellence in Production Design for a Television Movie or Mini-Series	Marcia Hinds; Bo Johnson	Nominated
1999	15th Artios Awards	Best Casting for TV Movie of the Week	Juel Bestrop	Nominated
1999	6th Cinema Audio Society Awards	Outstanding Achievement in Sound Mixing for Television – Movie of the Week, Mini-Series or Specials	Richard Van Dyke; Dan Hiland; Gary D. Rogers	Nominated
1999	1st Costume Designers Guild Awards	Excellence in Costume Design for Television	Hope Hanafin	Nominated
1999	56th Golden Globe Awards	Best Actor – Miniseries or Television Film	Stanley Tucci	Won
1999	51st Primetime Emmy Awards	Outstanding Lead Actor in a Miniseries or Movie	Stanley Tucci	Won
1999	51st Primetime Emmy Awards	Outstanding Art Direction for a Miniseries or Movie	Cindy Coburn; Marcia Hinds; Bo Johnson	Nominated
1999	51st Primetime Emmy Awards	Outstanding Casting for a Miniseries or Movie	Juel Bestrop	Won
1999	51st Primetime Emmy Awards	Outstanding Cinematography for a Miniseries or Movie	Robbie Greenberg	Won
1999	5th Screen Actors Guild Awards	Outstanding Performance by a Male Actor in a Miniseries or Television Movie	Stanley Tucci	Nominated
