= Rosemary's Baby (film) =

1968 film by Roman Polanski

- Theatrical release poster by Philip Gips
- Directed by: Roman Polanski
- Screenplay by: Roman Polanski
- Based on: Rosemary's Baby by Ira Levin
- Produced by: William Castle
- Starring: Mia Farrow; John Cassavetes; Ruth Gordon; Sidney Blackmer; Maurice Evans; Ralph Bellamy
- Cinematography: William A. Fraker
- Edited by: Sam O'Steen; Bob Wyman
- Music by: Krzysztof Komeda
- Production company: William Castle Enterprises
- Distributed by: Paramount Pictures
- Release date: June 12, 1968
- Running time: 137 minutes
- Country: United States
- Language: English
- Budget: $3.2 million
- Box office: $33.4 million

Rosemary's Baby is a 1968 American supernatural psychological horror film written and directed by Roman Polanski, based on Ira Levin's 1967 novel. It stars Mia Farrow as Rosemary, a newlywed living in Manhattan who becomes pregnant, and begins to suspect that her elderly neighbors are Satanists who have sinister intentions regarding her and her baby. The film's supporting cast includes John Cassavetes, Ruth Gordon, Sidney Blackmer, Maurice Evans, Ralph Bellamy, Patsy Kelly, Angela Dorian, and Charles Grodin in his feature film debut.

Polanksi adapted the film's screenplay from Levin's novel, and the film was produced and partly-funded by William Castle, a producer known primarily for making low-budget horror films. It marked Polanski's first American production. Although the film is set in New York City, the majority of principal photography for Rosemary's Baby took place on soundstages at Paramount Studios in Los Angeles throughout late 1967.

Rosemary's Baby had its world premiere on June 12, 1968, and went on to become the eighth highest-grossing film at the United States box office that year, grossing over $30 million. It was met with significant critical acclaim and received numerous accolades, including multiple Golden Globe Award nominations and two Academy Award nominations, winning Best Supporting Actress (for Ruth Gordon) and the Golden Globe in the same category. Internationally, Farrow was nominated for the BAFTA Award for Best Leading Actress, while the film won the award for Best Foreign Film from the French Syndicate of Cinema Critics.

Since its release, Rosemary's Baby has been widely regarded as one of the greatest horror films of all time, (Note: Multiple periodicals and publications have included the film in lists of the greatest horror films of all time.) and in 2014 was selected for preservation in the United States National Film Registry by the Library of Congress as being "culturally, historically, or aesthetically significant." Critics and film scholars in the intervening years have analyzed numerous themes in the film, including paranoia, women's liberation, Catholicism, and the occult. The film was followed by the 1976 television sequel Look What's Happened to Rosemary's Baby, a 2014 miniseries, and a 2024 prequel, Apartment 7A.

== Plot ==
Guy and Rosemary Woodhouse rent a recently vacated apartment in the Bramford, a large Gothic building in Manhattan, after the previous tenant, an elderly woman, fell into a coma and died. Guy and Rosemary ignore their friend Hutch's warning about the Bramford's dark past involving witchcraft and murder. Rosemary meets a young woman, Terry Gionoffrio, a recovering drug addict whom Minnie and Roman Castevet, the Woodhouses' elderly next-door neighbors, took in. Rosemary admires a pendant necklace the Castevets gave to Terry but dislikes its pungent odor. One night, Terry apparently jumps to her death from the Castevets' seventh-floor apartment. Soon the Castevets befriend Guy and Rosemary. Guy grows increasingly fond of them, but Rosemary finds them annoying and meddlesome. Minnie gives Terry's "tannis root" pendant to Rosemary as a "good luck charm".

Guy lands an important role in a play after the original actor inexplicably goes blind. With his career on track, Guy wants to have a baby with Rosemary. On the night they plan to conceive, Minnie brings them individual cups of chocolate mousse. Guy chastises Rosemary for complaining hers tastes odd. Shortly after, Rosemary loses consciousness and experiences a dreamlike vision in which a demonic entity rapes her while Guy, the Castevets, and other Bramford tenants—all nude—watch. The next morning, Rosemary's body is covered in scratches. Guy admits to raping her while she was unconscious since he did not want to miss "baby night".

When Rosemary becomes pregnant, the Castevets insist she see their close friend Dr. Abraham Sapirstein, a prominent obstetrician, rather than her own physician, Dr. Hill. During her first trimester, Rosemary suffers severe abdominal pains and alarming weight loss. By Christmastime, Rosemary's gaunt appearance alarms Hutch, who begins researching the Bramford's history. The day she is to meet Hutch to discuss his findings, Rosemary is notified that Hutch has fallen into a coma. At a dinner party, Rosemary confesses her concern to her girlfriends. Later, she begins discarding the mysterious "health drinks" Minnie provides her. When Rosemary tells Guy she wishes to see Dr. Hill, he gets angry. As they argue, the pains suddenly stop and Rosemary feels the baby move for the first time.

Three months later, Hutch's friend Grace notifies Rosemary that Hutch has died. Just before his death, he asked Grace to give Rosemary a book on witchcraft along with the cryptic message: "The name is an anagram". Rosemary studies the book and deduces that "Roman Castevet" is an anagram for "Steven Marcato," the son of a former Bramford resident and a reputed Satanist. She suspects the Castevets belong to a Satanic coven and intend to sacrifice her baby. When she visits Saperstein to confess her fears, he assures her that Roman is in ill health and does not have much longer to live. Meanwhile, Guy discounts Rosemary's suspicions, leading her to fear he may be conspiring with the Castevets.

Rosemary conducts further research and learns that covens utilize personal items to perform spells. She recalls that Guy acquired a necktie of the actor he replaced shortly before he went blind. Convinced Guy has joined the coven, Rosemary packs her belongings and visits Sapirstein's office. She is alarmed when the office receptionist makes a casual comment about Sapirstein smelling of tannis root. Rosemary flees and visits Dr. Hill, who assumes she is delusional and calls Sapirstein, who arrives with Guy and takes her home. Rosemary locks herself in the apartment, but coven members infiltrate and restrain her. Sapirstein sedates a hysterical Rosemary, who goes into labor. When she awakens, she is told the baby was stillborn. As Rosemary recovers, she hears an infant crying, which Guy claims belongs to new tenants.

Believing her baby is alive, Rosemary examines a linen closet that shares a wall with the Castevets' apartment and discovers a hidden door connecting them. In the living room, the Castevets, Guy, Sapirstein and other coven members are gathered around a cradle. Peering inside the cradle, Rosemary is horrified to see that the child has the same eyes as the figure that raped her in her dream. It is revealed that the child was not conceived by Guy, but by Satan himself, and is destined to lead his followers in a spiritual revolt. In exchange for Guy's cooperation, he was gifted professional success. The coven begin exclaiming "Hail Satan" before a hysterical Rosemary. When Guy tries to calm her, Rosemary spits in his face. Roman gently urges her to be a mother to the child. Rosemary appears stunned, but after hearing the infant's cries, she tenderly begins to rock the cradle.

== Cast ==
- Mia Farrow as Rosemary Woodhouse
- John Cassavetes as Guy Woodhouse
- Ruth Gordon as Minnie Castevet
- Sidney Blackmer as Roman Castevet
- Maurice Evans as Hutch
- Ralph Bellamy as Dr. Abraham Sapirstein
- Angela Dorian as Terry Gionoffrio
- Patsy Kelly as Laura-Louise McBirney
- Elisha Cook as Mr. Nicklas
- Emmaline Henry as Elise Dunstan
- Charles Grodin as Dr. Hill
- Hanna Landy as Grace Cardiff
- Philip Leeds as Dr. Shand
- D'Urville Martin as Diego
- Hope Summers as Mrs. Gilmore
- Marianne Gordon as Rosemary's girlfriend
- Ernest Harada as Hayato
- Wendy Wagner as Rosemary's girlfriend
- Tony Curtis as Donald Baumgart (voice; uncredited)

== Themes ==
=== Women's autonomy ===
Writer Eleanor Johnson observes coercive control and domestic violence against women as prominent themes in the film, which she views as "one of the greatest horror films of all time" as well as "one of the most sociological." Johnson cites Guy's manipulation of Rosemary—coordinated with the Castevets—culminating in her rape by Satan and eventual birthing of the antichrist, as evidence of this: "Whatever supernatural horrors may arise in this film, there is a foundational domestic horror at work: Guy is a betrayer, a liar, and the facilitator of acute sexual violence toward his own wife. But as is too often the case in real-life instances of reproductive coercion, the reality is too horrible for Rosemary to hang onto, and she concludes, upon waking up, that it was, in fact, just a dream."

Scholar Brooke Coughenour comments that motherhood and pregnancy are "one side of the domestic themes" present in the film: "Rosemary’s rough pregnancy that she is made to believe is normal reflects a classic maternal anxiety: whether or not something is wrong with the baby."

=== Catholicism ===
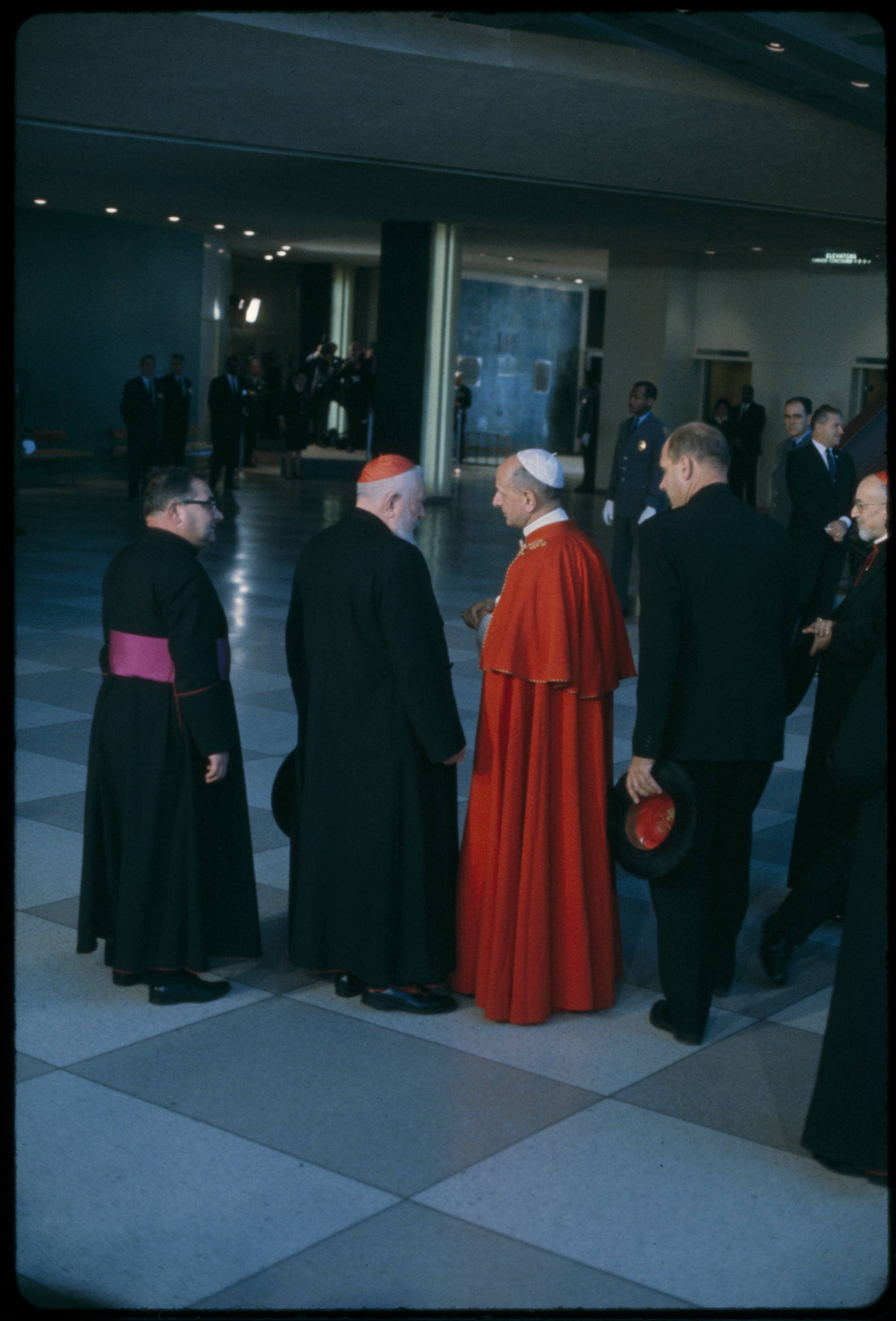
The sequence in which Rosemary is raped by Satan occurs during Pope Paul VI's 1965 visit to New York City

Catholicism has been cited as a significant theme in the film, particularly Rosemary's lapsed faith, which renders her a susceptible target to the Satanic cabal seeking to use her as a vessel. Journalist and film critic Renata Adler described the film as a "seriously lapsed-Catholic fable." Nick Ripatrazone, writing for America magazine, describes the film as "intensely Catholic" and notes that it emphasizes aspects of Rosemary's Catholic guilt, specifically in the surreal dream sequence in which she is raped on the night of Pope Paul VI's visit in New York City:

It is against this papal backdrop—and Guy’s curious narration of “Christ, what a mob”—that one of the most infamous scenes in the history of horror films unfolds. Rosemary collapses, and Guy carries her into bed, where she begins to have hallucinations. Despite her paltry defense of the church early in the film, Rosemary is God-haunted in her visions. She has already dreamt about an aggressive nun and now imagines being on a yacht with those most royal American Catholics, the Kennedys. One of her friends—a man who warned her about the apartment building’s Satanic past—is not allowed on the boat. “Catholics only,” she is told.

Scholar Thomas Aiello observes American "religious uncertainty" as "a function of social progress" as another theme. Aiello comments on a scene in which Rosemary reads an issue of Time magazine in Dr. Saperstein's office with the cover page reading "Is God Dead?", which was the magazine's actual April 8, 1966 cover story. Chicago Tribune journalist Norma Lee Browning observed that audiences would "look at the movie in different ways depending on their religion—or lack of it," feeling that the verity of the film's supernatural elements could be interpreted from multiple perspectives.

Polanski himself felt that the novel was open to interpretation, and that the apparent supernatural events and existence of the coven could be viewed as a paranoid fantasy stemming from Rosemary's strenuous pregnancy. Farrow, however, commented that she took the events literally, stating: "I felt, when seeing the movie, that it wasn't in her mind." Farrow speculated that the reason the newborn Antichrist was not shown onscreen had to do budgetary restrictions, while Polanski commented in 2012 that he felt it would have been a "great mistake" to show the baby.

== Production ==
=== Development ===
In Rosemary's Baby: A Retrospective, a featurette on the DVD release of the film, screenwriter/director Roman Polanski, Paramount Pictures executive Robert Evans, and production designer Richard Sylbert reminisce at length about the production. Evans recalled William Castle brought him the galley proofs of the book and asked him to purchase the film rights even before Random House published the book in April 1967. The studio head recognized the commercial potential of the project and agreed with the stipulation that Castle, who had a reputation for low-budget horror films, could produce but not direct the film adaptation. Castle ultimately provided $150,000 in funds to help make the film, and makes a cameo appearance as the man at the phone booth waiting for Rosemary to finish her call.

François Truffaut said that Alfred Hitchcock was first offered the chance to direct the film but declined. Evans admired Polanski's European films, particularly Repulsion (1965), and hoped he could convince him to make his American debut with Rosemary's Baby. He knew the director was a ski buff who was anxious to make a film with the sport as its basis, so he sent him the script for Downhill Racer along with the galleys for Rosemary's Baby. Polanski read the latter book non-stop through the night and called Evans the following morning to tell him he thought Rosemary's Baby was the more interesting project, and would like the opportunity to write as well as direct it. After negotiations, Paramount agreed to hire Polanski for the project, with a tentative budget of $1.9 million, $150,000 of which would go to Polanski.

Polanski completed the 272-page screenplay for the film in approximately three weeks. Polanski closely modeled it on the original 1967 novel by Ira Levin and incorporated large sections of the novel's dialogue and details, with much of it being lifted directly from the source text.

Without the restrictions imposed by the Motion Picture Production Code, which had recently been replaced by the Motion Picture Association film rating system, Rosemary's Baby marked the first American film of any genre to depict a pregnancy from conception to birth in chronological order.

=== Casting ===
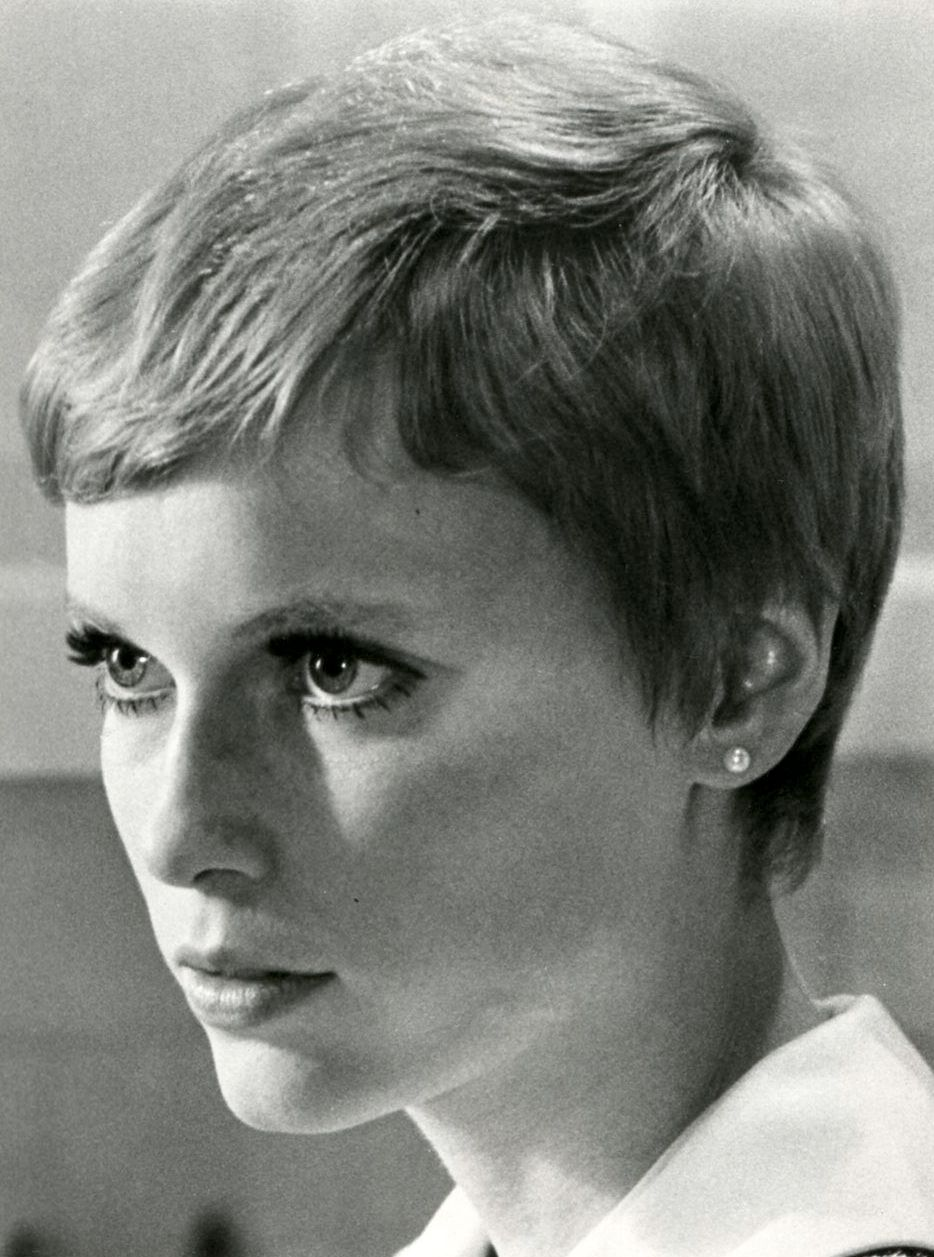
Mia Farrow's performance as Rosemary Woodhouse received widespread critical acclaim.

Casting for Rosemary's Baby began in the summer of 1967 in Los Angeles. Polanski originally envisioned Rosemary as a robust, full-figured, girl-next-door type, and wanted Tuesday Weld or his own fiancée Sharon Tate to play the role. Jane Fonda, Patty Duke and Goldie Hawn were also reportedly considered for the role.

Since the book had not yet reached bestseller status, Evans was unsure the title alone would guarantee an audience for the film, and he believed that a bigger name was needed for the lead. Farrow, with a supporting role in Guns at Batasi (1964) and the yet-unreleased A Dandy in Aspic (1968) as her only feature film credits, had an unproven box office track record; however, she had gained wider notice with her role as Allison MacKenzie in the popular television series Peyton Place, and her unexpected marriage to singer Frank Sinatra. Despite her waif-like appearance, Polanski agreed to cast her. Her acceptance incensed Sinatra, who had demanded she forgo her career when they wed. In a publicity event, hairdresser Vidal Sassoon was flown in from London to give Farrow the pixie cut featured in the film, although Farrow later recounted that she had already cut her hair short prior to the event.

Robert Redford was the first choice for the role of Guy Woodhouse, but declined. Jack Nicholson and Warren Beatty were both considered for the part, before Polanski suggested John Cassavetes, whom he had met in London. In casting the film's secondary actors, Polanski drew sketches of what he imagined the characters would look like, which were then used by Paramount casting directors to match with potential actors. In the roles of Roman and Minnie Castevet, Polanski cast veteran stage and film actors Sidney Blackmer and Ruth Gordon. Veteran actor Ralph Bellamy was cast as Dr. Sapirstein. (Many years earlier, Bellamy and Blackmer had appeared in the pre-Code 1934 film This Man Is Mine.)

When Rosemary calls Donald Baumgart, the actor who goes blind and is replaced by Guy, the voice heard on the phone was actor Tony Curtis in an uncredited role. Farrow, who had not been told who would be reading Baumgart's lines, recognized the voice but could not place it. The natural confusion she displays in her performance was exactly what Polanski hoped to capture by not revealing Curtis' identity in advance.

=== Filming ===
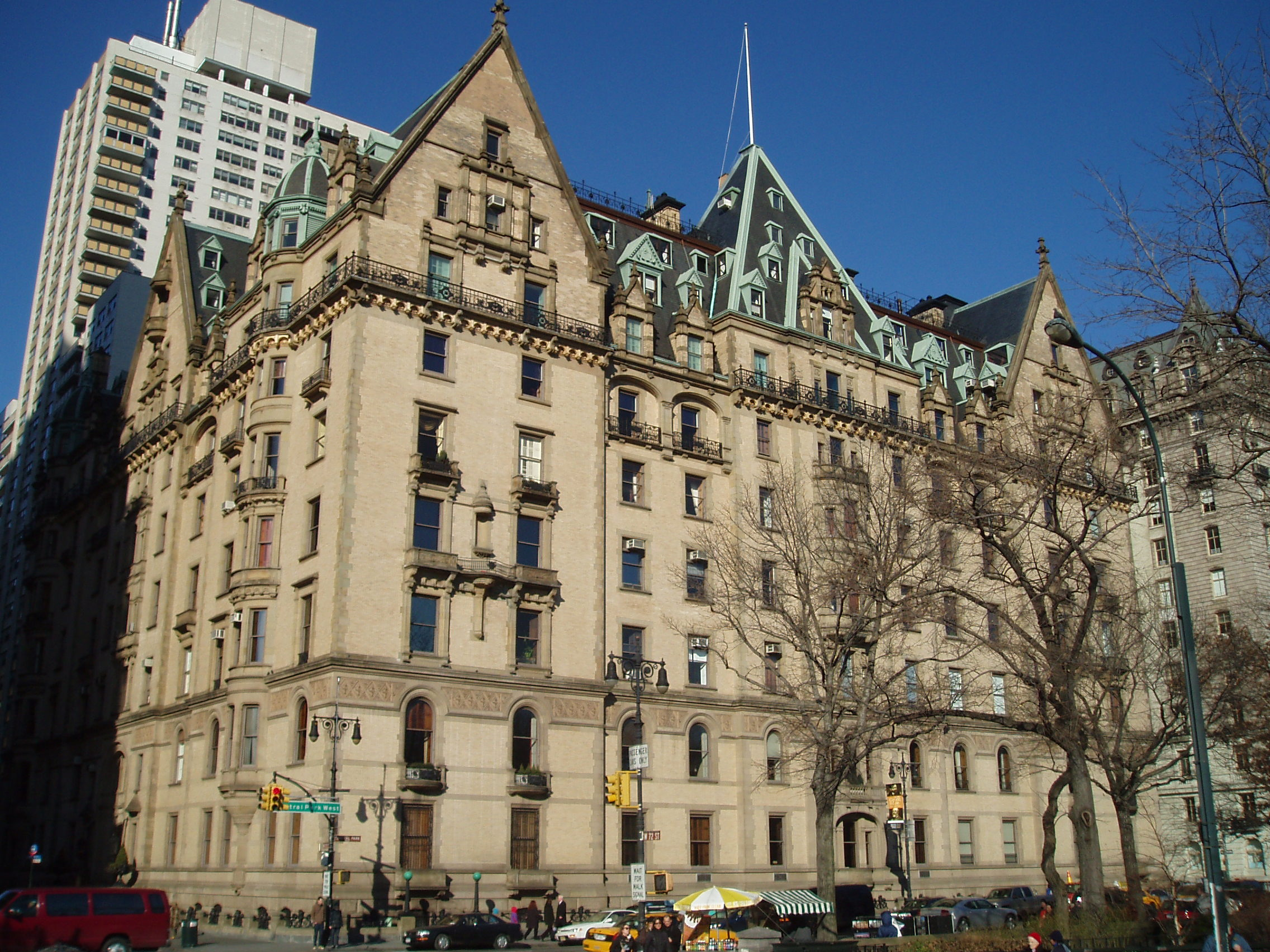
The Dakota served as a stand-in for exterior shots of the fictional Bramford Building

Principal photography for Rosemary's Baby began on August 21, 1967, in New York City. The Dakota's exteriors served as the location for the fictional Bramford. Levin modeled it on buildings like the Dakota. In the novel, Hutch even urges Rosemary and Guy to move into "the Dakota" instead of the Bramford.

Roman Polanski and Mia Farrow during filming

When Farrow was reluctant to film a scene that depicted a dazed and preoccupied Rosemary wandering into the middle of Fifth Avenue into oncoming traffic, Polanski pointed to her pregnancy padding and reassured her, "no one's going to hit a pregnant woman". The scene was successfully shot with Farrow walking into real traffic and Polanski following, operating the hand-held camera since he was the only one willing to do it.

By September 1967, the shoot had relocated to Paramount Studios in Hollywood, where interior sets of the Bramford apartments had been constructed on sound stages. Some additional location shooting took place in Playa del Rey in October 1967. Farrow recalled that the dream sequence in which her character is attending a dinner party on a yacht was filmed on a vessel near Santa Catalina Island. Though Paramount had initially agreed to spend $1.9 million to make the film, the shoot was overextended due to Polanski's meticulous attention to detail, which resulted in his completing up to fifty takes of single shots. The shoot suffered significant scheduling problems as a result, and ultimately went $400,000 over budget. In November 1967, it was reported that the shoot was over three weeks behind schedule.

The shoot was further disrupted when, midway through filming, Farrow's husband, Frank Sinatra, served her divorce papers via a corporate lawyer in front of the cast and crew. In an effort to salvage her relationship, Farrow asked Evans to release her from her contract, but he persuaded her to remain with the project after showing her an hour-long rough cut and assuring her she would receive an Academy Award nomination for her performance. Filming was completed on December 20, 1967, in Los Angeles.

== Music ==
Rosemary's Baby (Music from the Original Motion Picture Score)

Soundtrack album by Krzysztof Komeda
- Released: 1968
- Recorded: June 25, 1968
- Studios: Western Recorders, Hollywood, California
- Genres: Film score; jazz
- Length: 25:21
- Label: Dot Records
- Producer: Tom Mack

The lullaby played over the intro is the song "Sleep Safe and Warm", composed by Krzysztof Komeda and sung by Farrow. A tenant practicing "Für Elise" is also frequently used as background music throughout the film, the skill improving throughout the film to demonstrate the progression of time. The original film soundtrack was released in 1968 via Dot Records. Waxwork Records released the soundtrack from the original master tapes in 2014, including Krzysztof Komeda's original work.

=== Track listing ===
Side 1
No.	Title	Length
1.	"Lullaby from Rosemary's Baby, Part 1"	2:20
2.	"The Coven"	0:45
3.	"Moment Musical"	2:00
4.	"Dream"	3:45
5.	"Christmas"	2:05
6.	"Expectancy"	2:21
Total length:		13:16

Side 2
No.	Title	Length
7.	"Main Title (Vocal)"	2:50
8.	"Panic"	2:02
9.	"Rosemary's Party"	2:05
10.	"Through The Closet"	1:44
11.	"What Have You Done To Its Eyes"	1:27
12.	"Happy News"	1:57
Total length:		12:05

== Release ==
Portland, Oregon (left) and Billings, Montana (right) newspaper advertisements bearing the tagline "Pray for Rosemary's Baby"

Rosemary's Baby was given a wide theatrical release by Paramount Pictures, premiering in New York City on June 12, 1968. The film's West Coast premiere was held two days later in Los Angeles. It continued to screen throughout the United States through 1970, (Note: Newspapers indicate the film's screenings continued at American cinemas and drive-in theaters until at least late 1970.) sometimes paired as a double feature with Paramount's Western, Blue (1968).

The film's United Kingdom premiere took place in London, where it was released on January 23, 1969.

=== Censorship ===
In the United Kingdom, censors at the British Board of Film Classification (BBFC) were "appalled" by the film and excised fifteen seconds of footage from the surreal sequence in which Rosemary is raped by Satan. The censors board justified their decision to excise the footage as it featured offensive "kinky sex."

=== Home media ===
Paramount Home Entertainment first released Rosemary's Baby on VHS and CED Video Disc in 1981, followed by a pan and scan LaserDisc release in 1982. Paramount reissued the film on VHS in 1991, followed by a widescreen LaserDisc in 1998. A commemorative edition VHS was released by Paramount in 2000, featuring interviews with Polanski, Evans, and production designer Richard Sylbert after the feature.

Paramount Home Entertainment's first DVD edition of the film, released on October 3, 2000, contains a 23-minute documentary film, Mia and Roman, directed by Shahrokh Hatami, which was shot during the making of the film. It features footage of Polanski directing the film's cast on set. Hatami was an Iranian photographer who befriended Polanski and his wife Sharon Tate. Mia and Roman was screened originally as a promo film at Hollywood's Lytton Center in July 1968. It is described as a "trippy on-set featurette" and "an odd little bit of cheese."

On October 30, 2012, The Criterion Collection released the film for the first time on Blu-ray, as well as in a two-disc DVD set. The Criterion release featured a new digital restoration approved by Polanski, a new documentary featuring interviews with Polanski, Mia Farrow, and executive producer Robert Evans, a feature-length documentary on composer Krzystof Komeda, and never-before published sketches of the Woodhouse apartment's floor plan by author Ira Levin.

After the Criterion Collection releases went out of print, Paramount released the film the first time on 4K Ultra HD for its 55th anniversary on October 10, 2023.

== Reception ==
=== Box office ===
Rosemary's Baby was a major box-office hit for Paramount Pictures, grossing a total of $33,397,080 worldwide (equivalent to US$309,202,631 in 2025) against its $3.2 million budget. It was the eighth highest-grossing film of 1968.

=== Critical response ===
Renata Adler wrote in The New York Times that: "The movie—although it is pleasant—doesn't seem to work on any of its dark or powerful terms. I think this is because it is almost too extremely plausible. The quality of the young people's lives seems the quality of lives that one knows, even to the point of finding old people next door to avoid and lean on. One gets very annoyed that they don't catch on sooner."

Stanley Eichelbaum of the San Francisco Examiner called the film "a delightful witches brew, a bit over-long for my taste, but nearly always absorbing, suspenseful and easier to swallow than Ira Levin's book. Its suggestions of deviltry in a musty and still-respectable old apartment house on Manhattan's Upper West Side are more gracefully and appealingly related than in the novel, which I found awfully silly, when it wasn't downright noxious. The very idea of a contemporary case of witchcraft, in which an innocent young housewife is impregnated by the Devil, is to say the least unnerving, particularly when the pregnancy is marked by all degrees of mental and physical pain." The Chicago Tribune's Clifford Terry similarly heralded the film as a "masterful mixture of obstetrics and the occult."

Variety said, "Several exhilarating milestones are achieved in Rosemary's Baby, an excellent film version of Ira Levin's diabolical chiller novel. Writer-director Roman Polanski has triumphed in his first US-made pic. The film holds attention without explicit violence or gore... Farrow's performance is outstanding." Charles Champlin of the Los Angeles Times praised the film's performances and technical aspects, despite characterizing its plot as obscene, "sleazy and sick at heart... its rebasing of human values find no point to make. Its surfaces are too accurate and Miss Farrow's anguish too real to let us be comfortable in some never-never land of escape."

The Monthly Film Bulletin said that "After the miscalculations of Cul de Sac and Dance of the Vampires", Polanski had "returned to the rich vein of Repulsion." The review noted that "Polanski shows an increasing ability to evoke menace and sheer terror in familiar routines (cooking and telephoning, particularly)", and Polanski has shown "his transformation of a cleverly calculated thriller into a serious work of art." Ted Mahar, writing for The Oregonian, praised the film's performances and heralded it as the "best suspense drama since Psycho."

=== Accolades ===
Institution	Year	Category	Recipient(s) and nominee(s)	Result	Ref.
Academy Awards	1969	Best Supporting Actress	Ruth Gordon	Won	
Academy Awards	1969	Best Screenplay – Based on Material from Another Medium	Roman Polanski	Nominated	
British Academy Film Awards	1970	Best Actress in a Leading Role	Mia Farrow	Nominated	
David di Donatello Awards	1969	Best Foreign Actress	Mia Farrow	Won (Note: Tied with Barbra Streisand for Funny Girl.)	
David di Donatello Awards	1969	Best Foreign Director	Roman Polanski	Won	
Directors Guild of America Awards	1969	Outstanding Directorial Achievement in Motion Pictures	Roman Polanski	Nominated	
Edgar Allan Poe Awards	1969	Best Motion Picture	Roman Polanski	Nominated	
The Film Daily Critics' Poll	1968	Best Film	Rosemary's Baby	2nd place	
Fotogramas de Plata	1969	Best Foreign Movie Performer	Mia Farrow	Won	
French Syndicate of Cinema Critics	1969	Best Foreign Film	Roman Polanski	Won	
Golden Globe Awards	1969	Best Actress in a Motion Picture – Drama	Mia Farrow	Nominated	
Golden Globe Awards	1969	Best Supporting Actress – Motion Picture	Ruth Gordon	Won	
Golden Globe Awards	1969	Best Screenplay	Roman Polanski	Nominated	
Golden Globe Awards	1969	Best Original Score	Krzysztof Komeda	Nominated	
Hugo Awards	1969	Best Dramatic Presentation	Roman Polanski (director/screenplay); Ira Levin (original novel)	Nominated	
Kansas City Film Critics Circle Awards	1969	Best Supporting Actor	Sidney Blackmer	Won	
Kansas City Film Critics Circle Awards	1969	Best Supporting Actress	Ruth Gordon	Won	
Laurel Awards	1969	Top Drama	Rosemary's Baby	Nominated	
Laurel Awards	1969	Top Female Dramatic Performance	Mia Farrow	Nominated	
Laurel Awards	1969	Top Female Supporting Performance	Ruth Gordon	Nominated	
National Film Preservation Board	2014	National Film Registry	Rosemary's Baby	Inducted	
Online Film & Television Association Awards	2020	Film Hall of Fame: Productions	Rosemary's Baby	Won	
Photoplay Awards	1969	Gold Medal	Rosemary's Baby	Won	
Writers Guild of America Awards	1969	Best Written American Drama	Roman Polanski	Nominated	

=== Reaction from religious institutions ===
Upon release, Rosemary's Baby received some backlash from religious institutions in the United States, and was condemned by the National Catholic Office for Motion Pictures (NCOMP). The organization described the film as "the ultimate test as to whether or not NCOMP has retained any of its legendary economic power" over the film industry. Robert Francis Joyce, then bishop of the Diocese of Burlington, Vermont, urged the public to avoid the film as "unusually undesirable and unsatisfactory fare."

The Los Angeles-based Catholic publication The Tidings lambasted the film, alleging that it "directs its hate to God. It does violence to the essential belief of Christians in the birth of Christ. It does violence to this belief by portraying with great, technical deliberateness a blasphemous parody on the birth of the Son of God." The publication also made reference to the assassination of Robert F. Kennedy—which occurred the week prior to the film's release—writing: "As surely as bullets penetrated Senator Kennedy, so too just as surely this movie's terrible evil penetrates the core of the American spirit." Some Catholics at the time argued that the film had theological value in its representation of Satan as a real figure, and felt that it contained valuable commentary on the dangers of losing one's "faith and spirituality in a materialistic society."

Writing for the National Catholic Register in 2021, K. V. Turley notes that, "until the late 1960s, there had never been a Hollywood film [like Rosemary's Baby] where evil triumphed so blatantly. And what evil: nothing less than the birth of the Antichrist. There are, of course, many subtler, (and therefore all the more disquieting) hints of evil that suffuse the film."

Mia Farrow, a devout Catholic who "not very much earlier had wanted to become a nun," felt there was an "edginess" to the film's occult subject matter. "Especially the end, with everyone [chanting] "Hail Satan" and the birth of the devil, and that's the way it's kind of left. It was unsettling [to me]. Farrow addressed the film's controversy in 2006: "It's just a movie at the end of the day, although that's not to say that evil doesn't exist. I see evil as the twin of good. Also in every human being there is the capacity for altruism and great goodness. I think it's the role of parents and educators to say that evil is not some cartoon outside yourself. It's in your own make-up and in the human heart. Know it, identify it, and weed it out every single day."

The novel's author, Ira Levin, pondered in a 2003 afterword whether his idea for Rosemary's Baby ultimately led to an increase in religious fundamentalism.

=== Modern appraisal and legacy ===
On the review aggregator website Rotten Tomatoes, 97% of 88 critics' reviews are positive, with an average rating of 9.1/10. The website's consensus reads: "A frightening tale of Satanism and pregnancy that is even more disturbing than it sounds thanks to convincing and committed performances by Mia Farrow and Ruth Gordon." Metacritic, which uses a weighted average, assigned the film a score of 96 out of 100, based on 16 critics, indicating "universal acclaim". It has been cited by numerous publications as one of the greatest horror films of all time.

In 2001, the American Film Institute placed it as the ninth-most thrilling film of all time in their 100 Years...100 Thrills list. In 2010, The Guardian ranked it the second-best horror film ever made. In 2026, Empire ranked the film at number eleven in a list of the fifty best horror films of all time, while the same year, the London Standard included it at number eight in their list of the ten greatest horror films.

In the years since its original release, Rosemary's Baby has developed a devoted cult following, and inaugurated cinema's growing fascination with demons and related occult themes in the coming decades.

In 2014, the film was deemed "culturally, historically, or aesthetically significant" by the Library of Congress and selected for preservation in the National Film Registry.

== Aftermath and urban legends ==
A popular urban legend has it that Anton LaVey, the founder of the Church of Satan, served as a technical advisor on the film and also appeared onscreen uncredited as Satan. This claim, though unfounded, originates from LaVey's own biography.

Similar to other demonic and occult-related films such as The Exorcist (1973) and The Omen (1976), Rosemary's Baby has also been subject to speculation of it being allegedly cursed. These claims stem from several tragic incidents that occurred involving crew members after the film's release. The film's composer, Krzysztof Komeda, died of a brain hematoma after suffering an accidental fall in Warsaw approximately ten months after the film's premiere. The same month, producer William Castle, antagonized by hate mail he had received over the film, was stricken with severe kidney stones, and claimed to have hallucinated scenes from the film while hospitalized.

In August 1969, Polanski's wife, Sharon Tate, and their unborn child, were murdered in Los Angeles by members of the Manson Family. The phrase "Helter Skelter", taken from a 1968 Beatles song of the same name, was scrawled in blood at the crime scene; coincidentally, Beatles member John Lennon was murdered in 1980 in front of The Dakota, the apartment building where he resided and where exterior sequences in the film were shot. In 2022, these events surrounding the film were profiled on the Shudder series Cursed Films.

== Related works ==
Rosemary's Baby was followed by a television sequel, Look What's Happened to Rosemary's Baby (1976), starring Patty Duke portrayed Rosemary, Stephen McHattie as the now-adult son (called 'Adrian'), and Ray Milland as Roman Castevet. Ruth Gordon reprises her role of Minnie Castevet. The film introduced an adult Adrian attempting to earn his place as the Antichrist. It was directed by Sam O'Steen, the editor of the original film. The film is unrelated to the novel's 1997 sequel, Son of Rosemary.

After the success of Paramount's Friday the 13th Part III, the producer of the film, Frank Mancuso Jr., was assigned to work on another 3D film, with one of the projects considered being a 3-D remake of Rosemary's Baby. Mancuso ultimately decided to produce The Man Who Wasn't There. Another attempt to remake Rosemary's Baby was considered in 2008. The intended producers were Michael Bay, Andrew Form, and Brad Fuller. The remake fell through later that same year.

In January 2014, NBC released a four-hour miniseries starring Zoe Saldaña as Rosemary. The miniseries was filmed in Paris under the direction of Agnieszka Holland.

The Karyn Kusama-directed short Her Only Living Son from the 2017 horror anthology film XX serves as an unofficial sequel to the film.

Rosemary's Baby was followed by a prequel in 2024, Apartment 7A, which takes place a year prior and leading up to the events of Rosemary's Baby, and expands on the backstories of Terry Gionoffrio and Mrs. Gardenia, who appear as minor characters in the original film. Apartment 7A premiered in September 2024 on the streaming service Paramount+.

== See also ==
- List of American films of 1968
- List of cult films
- List of films about witchcraft
- Satanic film

== Sources ==
- Aiello, Thomas (2013). "Rosemary's Baby and Cold-War Catholicism". In DiPaolo, Marc (ed.). Unruly Catholics: Faith, Heresy, and Politics in Cultural Studies. Lanham, Maryland: Scarecrow Press. pp. 111–124. ISBN 979-8-216-21749-7.
- Boswell, Parley Ann (2014). Pregnancy in Literature and Film. Jefferson, North Carolina: McFarland & Company. ISBN 978-1-476-61468-7.
- Bucknell, Angie (director) (2012). Remembering Rosemary's Baby (Documentary short). The Criterion Collection.
- Christie, Ian Leslie (1969). "Rosemary's Baby". Monthly Film Bulletin. Vol. 36, no. 420. London: British Film Institute. ISSN 0027-0407.
- Coughenour, Brooke (2020). "Rosemary's Baby and the Cult of Domesticity". Cardinal Compositions. 4. University of Louisville: 45–49. Archived from the original on December 1, 2023.
- Cowan, Douglas E. (2008). Sacred Terror: Religion and Horror on the Silver Screen. Waco, Texas: Baylor University Press. ISBN 978-1-602-58018-3.
- Deal, David (2015). Television Fright Films of the 1970s. Jefferson, North Carolina: McFarland & Company. ISBN 978-0-786-45514-0.
- Havis, Allan (2008). Cult Films: Taboo and Transgression. Lanham, Maryland: University Press of America. ISBN 978-0-761-87282-5.
- Lautner, Georges, ed. (2008). L'Avant Scène cinéma n°568 : Le Septième Juré - Janvier 2008 (in French). Paris, France: L'Avant-Scène. ISBN 978-2-847-25062-6.
- Levin, Ira (1991) [1967]. Rosemary's Baby. New York City, New York: Bantam Books. ISBN 978-0-553-29001-1.
- Markusen, Bruce (2021). Hosted Horror on Television: The Films and Faces of Shock Theater, Creature Features and Chiller Theater. Jefferson, North Carolina: McFarland & Company. ISBN 978-1-476-68461-1.
- Newton, Michael (2020). Rosemary's Baby. BFI Film Classics. British Film Institute. ISBN 978-1-838-71901-2.
- Patterson, R. Gary (2004). Take a Walk on the Dark Side: Rock and Roll Myths, Legends, and Curses. New York City, New York: Touchstone Books. ISBN 978-0-743-24423-7.
- Sandford, Christopher (2009). Polanski: A Biography. New York City, New York: Macmillan. ISBN 978-0-23-061176-4.
- Sheppard, LMK (2022). Faith Horror: Cinematic Visions of Satanism, Paganism and Witchcraft, 1966-1978. Jefferson, North Carolina: McFarland & Company. ISBN 978-1-476-68161-0.
- Simon, Ed (2022). Pandemonium: A Visual History of Demonology. New York City, New York: Abrams. ISBN 978-1-64700-389-0.
- Sloan, Jane (2007). Reel Women: An International Directory of Contemporary Feature Films about Women. London, England: Bloomsbury Publishing. ISBN 979-8-216-21251-5.
- Van Heerden, Bill (1998). Film and Television In-Jokes: Nearly 2,000 Intentional References, Parodies, Allusions, Personal Touches, Cameos, Spoofs and Homages. Jefferson, North Carolina: McFarland & Company. ISBN 978-1-476-61206-5.
- Wanamaker, Marc; Christaldi, Michael; Stephens, E. J. (2016). Paramount Studios: 1940-2000. Charleston, South Carolina: Arcadia Publishing. ISBN 978-1-467-13494-1.
