= The Boys from Brazil (miniseries) =

Upcoming television miniseries

- Created by: Peter Morgan
- Based on: The Boys from Brazil by Ira Levin
- Written by: Peter Morgan
- Directed by: Alex Gabassi
- Starring: Jeremy Strong; Gillian Anderson; Daniel Brühl; August Diehl; Lizzy Caplan; Shira Haas; Paul Ben-Victor

Production
- Executive producers: Peter Morgan; Suzanne Mackie; Simon Heath; Alex Gabassi
- Producers: Oona O'Beirn; Andy Stebbing
- Cinematography: Robert Elswit
- Production companies: World Productions; Orchid Pictures

Original release
- Network: Netflix

The Boys from Brazil is an upcoming television miniseries created by Peter Morgan, based on the 1976 novel of the same name by Ira Levin.

== Cast ==
- Jeremy Strong as Yakov Liebermann
- Gillian Anderson as Frieda Steiner
- Daniel Brühl as Von Harteneck
- August Diehl as Doctor Johann-Friedrich Meinhardt
- Lizzy Caplan as Hannah Liebermann
- Shira Haas as Anna Koehler
- Paul Ben-Victor as Sidney Beynon

== Production ==
=== Development ===
In June 2024, Peter Morgan announced that his next project would be an adaptation of Ira Levin's 1976 novel, The Boys from Brazil. The five-part limited series was greenlit by Netflix in November 2025.

=== Casting ===
On 12 February 2025, it was announced that Jeremy Strong would star as Yakov Liebermann in the series. Regarding the project, which marks Strong's return to television after Succession (2018–2023), he stated, "It's about the state of the world, which is ripe for a revival and a resurgence of fascism. It seems clear to me that we're in that moment in history again, and that we've forgotten the lessons of the past, which we're doomed to repeat if we don't wake up."

Gillian Anderson, Daniel Brühl, August Diehl, Lizzy Caplan, and Shira Haas were announced as cast members in November 2025. Paul Ben-Victor was announced as a cast member the following month.

=== Filming ===
In December 2025, filming took place at the Zerkall Paper Mill in Hürtgenwald. In January 2026, filming took place at Babelsberg Studio in Potsdam. The following month, filming took place in the castle of Waldenburg and in Potsdam, the latter of which served as a stand-in for Buenos Aires.
