= Ira Levin =

American novelist, playwright, and songwriter (1929–2007)

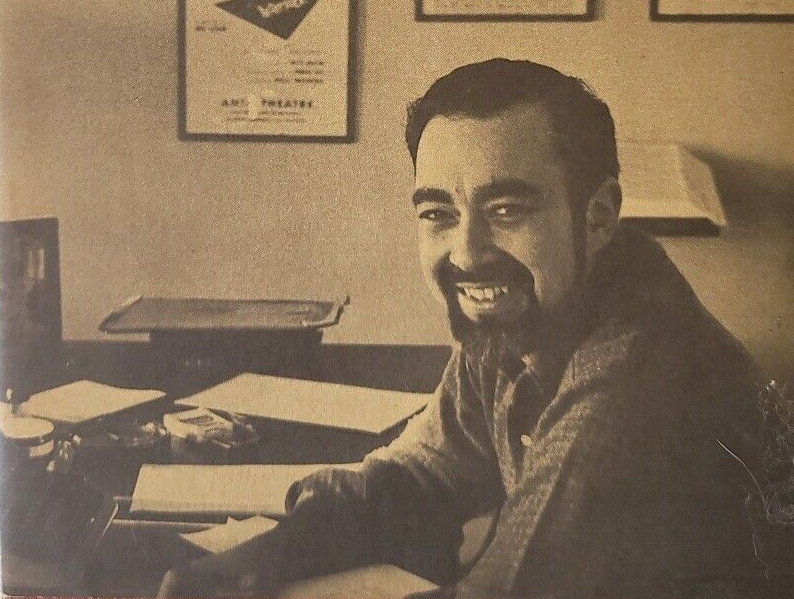
- Portrait from the first edition of Rosemary's Baby (1967, photo by Inge Morath)
- Born: Ira Marvin Levin; August 27, 1929; New York City, U.S.
- Died: November 12, 2007 (aged 78); New York City, U.S.
- Occupations: Novelist; playwright; songwriter
- Spouses: Gabrielle Aronsohn (m. 1960; div. 1968); Phyllis Sugarman (m. 1979; div. 1981)
- Children: 3
- Website: iralevin.org

Ira Marvin Levin (August 27, 1929 – November 12, 2007) was an American novelist, playwright, and songwriter. His works include the novels A Kiss Before Dying (1953), Rosemary's Baby (1967), The Stepford Wives (1972), This Perfect Day (1970), The Boys from Brazil (1976), and Sliver (1991). Levin also wrote the play Deathtrap (1978). Many of his novels and plays have been adapted into films. He received the Prometheus Hall of Fame Award and several Edgar Awards. In 1996 he was given the Bram Stoker Award for Lifetime Achievement.

== Early life ==
Levin was born on August 27, 1929, in Manhattan, New York City to a family of Russian-Jewish descent. He grew up in both Manhattan and the Bronx. His father, Charles, was a toy importer. Levin was educated at the private Horace Mann School in New York City. During his youth, he was described as "a nice Jewish boy from New York". He attended Drake University in Des Moines, Iowa from 1946 to 1948, and then New York University, where he majored in philosophy and English literature. He graduated in 1950. He served in the U.S. Army Signal Corps during the Korean War, from 1953 to 1955.

== Professional life ==
=== Scriptwriting ===
As a student at New York University, Levin entered a contest for scriptwriting sponsored by the commercial television broadcaster CBS. His script was the basis for "The Old Woman", an episode of the TV series The Clock (Dec. 1, 1950). After college, Levin wrote training films and other scripts for radio and television.

Levin's first produced play was No Time for Sergeants (adapted from the 1954 Mac Hyman novel), a comedy about a hillbilly drafted into the United States Air Force. It opened on Broadway in 1955 and starred Andy Griffith, whose career it jumpstarted. The play was adapted as a movie of the same name, released in 1958, with Griffith reprising his role and co-starring Nick Adams. Later the concept was developed as a 1964 television comedy series starring Sammy Jackson. No Time for Sergeants is generally considered the precursor to Gomer Pyle, U.S.M.C..

Levin's best-known play is Deathtrap (1978), which holds the record as the longest-running comedy thriller on Broadway. Levin won his second Edgar Award with this play. In 1982, it was adapted into a film of the same name, starring Christopher Reeve and Michael Caine.

=== Novels ===
Levin's first novel, A Kiss Before Dying (1953), was well received, and he won the 1954 Edgar Award for Best First Novel. A Kiss Before Dying was adapted twice as movies of the same name, first in 1956 and again in 1991.

Levin's best-known novel is Rosemary's Baby, a horror story of modern-day Satanism and other occultisms, set in Manhattan's Upper West Side. In 1968, it was adapted as a film written and directed by Roman Polanski. It starred Mia Farrow and John Cassavetes. Ruth Gordon won an Oscar for Best Actress in a Supporting Role for her performance. Roman Polanski was nominated for Best Writing, Screenplay Based on Material from Another Medium.

Levin said in 2002,

"I feel guilty that 'Rosemary's Baby' led to The Exorcist, The Omen. A whole generation has been exposed, has more belief in Satan. I don't believe in Satan. And I feel that the strong fundamentalism we have would not be as strong if there hadn't been so many of these books [...] Of course, I didn't send back any of the royalty checks."

Other Levin novels that were adapted as films included the satirical The Stepford Wives in 1975, again in 2004. The Boys from Brazil was adapted as a film released in 1978.

In 1970, Levin wrote the science-fiction novel This Perfect Day about a technocratic dystopia, for which he won a Prometheus Award in 1992.

In the 1990s, Levin wrote two more bestselling novels: Sliver (1991) and Son of Rosemary (1997). Sliver was adapted as a film in 1993 by Phillip Noyce. It starred Sharon Stone, William Baldwin and Tom Berenger. Son of Rosemary (1997) was proposed as a film sequel to Rosemary’s Baby. It was never developed into a film.

Stephen King has described Ira Levin as the "Swiss watchmaker" of suspense novels: "Every novel he has ever written has been a marvel of plotting (...) he makes what the rest of us do look like those five-dollar watches you can buy in the discount drug stores."

== Personal life ==
Levin was married twice, first to Gabrielle Aronsohn (from 1960 to 1968), with whom he had three sons, Adam, Jared, and Nicholas, and later to Phyllis Sugarman (died 2006). He had four grandchildren. Levin was a Jewish atheist.

== Death ==
Levin died of a heart attack at his home in Manhattan, New York City on November 12, 2007.

== Works ==
=== Novels ===
- A Kiss Before Dying (1953)
- Rosemary's Baby (1967)
- This Perfect Day (1970) – winner, 1992 Prometheus Hall of Fame Award
- The Stepford Wives (1972)
- The Boys from Brazil (1976)
- Sliver (1991)
- Son of Rosemary (1997)

=== Short stories ===
- "Sylvia." Manhunt, April 1955. Repr. Deadly Doings, ed. Martin H. Greenberg, Ivy, 1989. Adapted as "Sylvia," Alfred Hitchcock Presents, Jan 19, 1958.
- "The Underground Gourmet." Ladies Home Journal, Jan. 1954. Adapted as "The Devil You Say," General Electric Theater, Jan. 22, 1962.

=== Plays ===
- No Time for Sergeants (novel by Mac Hyman, 1954; expanded for Broadway by Levin, 1956)
- Interlock (1958)
- Critic's Choice (1960)
- General Seeger (1962)
- Dr. Cook's Garden (1968)
- Veronica's Room (1974)
- Deathtrap (1978) – Tony nomination for Best Play
- Break a Leg: A Comedy in Two Acts (1979)
- Cantorial (1982)
- Footsteps (2003)

=== Musicals ===
- Drat! The Cat! (1965) – lyricist and bookwriter

=== Screenplays ===
- "The Old Woman." The Clock, Dec 1, 1950.
- "Leda's Portrait." Lights Out, Mar. 12, 1951.
- "The Pattern." Lights Out, May 28, 1951.
- "The Notebook Warrior." United States Steel Hour, Sept 14, 1954; Matinee Theatre, Mar. 19, 1956.
- "No Time for Sergeants," United States Steel Hour, Mar. 15, 1955.

== Film and television adaptations ==
- A Kiss Before Dying (1956)
- No Time for Sergeants (1958)
- Critic's Choice (1963)
- Rosemary's Baby (1968)
- Dr. Cook's Garden (1971)
- The Stepford Wives (1975)
- Look What's Happened to Rosemary's Baby (1976) – sequel to Rosemary's Baby
- The Boys from Brazil (1978)
- Deathtrap (1982)
- A Kiss Before Dying (1991)
- Sliver (1993)
- Footsteps (2003)
- The Stepford Wives (2004)
- Rosemary's Baby (2014) – two-episode miniseries
- Apartment 7A (2024) – prequel to Rosemary's Baby
- The Boys from Brazil (TBA) – five-episode miniseries
