= Scott Abbott (screenwriter) =

American screenwriter and novelist

Scott Charles Abbott (born August 30, 1962) is an American screenwriter and novelist.

Abbott attended New York University, and was admitted to the American Film Institute's screenwriting program after writing his first script, My Father's Keeper. His screenwriting credits include Winchell (1998), Introducing Dorothy Dandridge (1999), Queen of the Damned (2002), and the 2014 miniseries Rosemary's Baby.

In 2017 his movie The Watcher in the Woods starring Anjelica Huston opened in theaters throughout Europe and aired on the Lifetime Network.

He also co-wrote the novel The Ghost of Christmas Present with Amy Maude Swinton, which was published by Simon & Schuster imprint Howard Books in 2012.

He has recently finished the script, Blackballed, chronicling the life of Fritz Pollard, the first African-American player and head-coach in the NFL, and is now writing Miracle Man, the story of the boxer Billy Miske.
