= The Boys from Brazil (film) =

1978 film by Franklin J. Schaffner

- Theatrical release poster
- Directed by: Franklin J. Schaffner
- Screenplay by: Heywood Gould
- Based on: The Boys from Brazil; 1976 novel by Ira Levin
- Produced by: Martin Richards; Stanley O'Toole
- Starring: Gregory Peck; Laurence Olivier; James Mason
- Cinematography: Henri Decaë
- Edited by: Robert Swink
- Music by: Jerry Goldsmith
- Production companies: ITC Films; Producer Circle
- Distributed by: 20th Century-Fox (North America); ITC Film Distributors (United Kingdom)
- Release dates: October 6, 1978 (United States); March 15, 1979 (United Kingdom)
- Running time: 125 minutes
- Countries: United Kingdom; United States
- Language: English
- Budget: $12 million
- Box office: $28 million (worldwide)

The Boys from Brazil is a 1978 science fiction thriller film in Panavision directed by Franklin J. Schaffner. It stars Gregory Peck and Laurence Olivier, and features James Mason, Lilli Palmer, Uta Hagen, Rosemary Harris, Anne Meara, Denholm Elliott, and Steve Guttenberg in supporting roles. The film is based on the 1976 novel by Ira Levin. It was nominated for three Academy Awards.

== Plot ==
Barry Kohler, an amateur Nazi hunter, spies on a meeting of the fugitive Nazi organization Kameraden in Paraguay. Infamous Auschwitz doctor Josef Mengele is providing instructions for 94 assassinations in Western Europe and North America on particular dates over a two year span. All the targets are low-ranking civil servants aged about sixty-five. Kohler telephones Ezra Lieberman, a well-known Nazi hunter living in Vienna, to inform him of his discovery. While still on the phone, Kohler is killed by the Kameraden.

Lieberman, himself penniless, enlists help from his sister Esther, British journalist Sidney Beynon and Jewish-American vigilante leader David Bennett. Over the next several months they investigate any sudden deaths of civil servants fitting the profile. Lieberman discovers all the dead men have sons aged 13 who look exactly alike, with pale skin, dark hair and blue eyes, all of the boys were illegally adopted and some of the adoptions were facilitated by Kameraden member Frieda Maloney. Lieberman interviews Maloney in prison and learns the boys were provided by an intermediary in Brazil. One of the adoptive fathers, American Henry Wheelock, gave her a newborn puppy in exchange for her baby.

Lieberman consults biologist Dr. Bruckner, who explains the boys' identical appearance as a result of cloning. Lieberman deduces boys are clones of Adolf Hitler, created from a single DNA sample by Mengele. Seeking to ensure their childhoods imitate that of the original Hitler, Mengele has had them adopted by parents who resemble Hitler's abusive father Alois (a civil servant in the Austro-Hungarian Empire) and doting mother Klara. Hoping similarities in upbringing will inspire their later lives to follow the same course, to establish new Nazi regimes in their respective countries, the murder of the fathers is factored into the plan, reflecting the death of Alois when Hitler was 13. Based on this revelation, and the age of Maloney's dog, Lieberman understands that Henry Wheelock will be murdered in just four days' time.

The Kameraden leadership grow alarmed by the progress of Lieberman's investigation, and Mengele's increasingly erratic behavior, almost dispatching one of his men for killing his target on the wrong date. They try to shut down the project, but Mengele escapes and his laboratory gets destroyed by Eduard Sibert, a retired German colonel.

Lieberman travels to rural Pennsylvania to warn Wheelock and arrives to find he's already been murdered by Mengele, impersonating Lieberman. In the proceeding struggle, Mengele severely wounds Lieberman, but is then cornered by the family's Doberman Pinschers. When Wheelock's son Bobby arrives home from school, Mengele attempts to tell him about his real origins. He doesn't deny killing Wheelock, and tells Bobby he must rise above his worthless adoptive family and embrace his destiny. Bobby, enraged, orders the dogs to kill Mengele. Lieberman recovers a list from Mengele's pocket detailing the identities of all 94 clones, and then collapses from blood loss.

Lieberman is visited in hospital by Bennett, who asks him to hand over the list so his vigilante group can eliminate the clones. Lieberman instead burns the list, declaring they are innocent children who may yet grow up to be harmless. Bobby gazes in fascination at photographs he took of Mengele's mauled corpse.

== Cast ==
- Gregory Peck as Dr. Josef Mengele
- Laurence Olivier as Ezra Lieberman (loosely based on Simon Wiesenthal)
- James Mason as Col. Eduard Seibert
- Lilli Palmer as Esther Lieberman
- Uta Hagen as Frieda Maloney
- Steve Guttenberg as Barry Kohler
- Denholm Elliott as Sidney Beynon
- Rosemary Harris as Frau Doring
- John Dehner as Henry Wheelock
- John Rubinstein as David Bennett
- Anne Meara as Mrs Curry
- Jeremy Black as Jack Curry Jr. / Simon Harrington / Erich Doring / Bobby Wheelock
- Bruno Ganz as Dr. Bruckner
- Walter Gotell as Capt. Gerhardt Mundt
- David Hurst as Strasser
- Wolfgang Preiss as Lofquist
- Michael Gough as Mr Harrington
- Joachim Hansen as Fassler
- Sky du Mont as Friedrich Hessen
- Carl Duering as Maj. Ludwig Trausteiner
- Linda Hayden as Nancy
- Richard Marner as Emil Doring
- Georg Marischka as Gunther
- Günter Meisner as Farnbach
- Prunella Scales as Mrs Harrington
- Raúl Faustino Saldanha as Ismael
- Wolf Kahler as Otto Schwimmer

== Production ==
=== Development ===
The book came out in 1976 and was a best seller. In August 1976 it was announced the Producers Group (Robert Fryer, Martin Richards, Mary Lee Johnson and James Cresson) had optioned the film rights to the novel and would make the movie in association with Lew Grade. Fryer had just made Voyage of the Damned for Grade. According to producer Martin Richards, Robert Mulligan was the original director.

In May 1977, it was announced Laurence Olivier would star. By this stage Franklin Schaffner was attached to direct. Gregory Peck joined the film in July. Olivier had recently been ill and was taking as many well-paying movie jobs as he could get in order to provide for his wife and children after his death. Peck agreed to portray Mengele only because he wanted to work with Olivier. Mason initially expressed interest in playing either Mengele or Lieberman. Lilli Palmer also accepted a small role just to work with Olivier. To prepare for the roles of the European clones, Jeremy Black was sent to a speech studio in New York City by 20th Century Fox to learn how to speak with both an English and a German accent.

"The emphasis of the film is not on Nazis," said producer Fryer. "It is really about cloning, a logical extension of existing facts. And it's about the hatred that two men have for each other."

=== Filming ===
Although the bulk of the film is set in South America, Fryer says actually filming on that continent was "logistically impossible" so the decision was made to shoot it in Lisbon, Portugal. Filming started in Portugal in October 1977, with additional filming in London, Vienna, the Kölnbrein Dam in Austria, and Lancaster, Pennsylvania. The scenes that were set in Massachusetts were shot in London.

The altercation between Lieberman and Mengele took about three or four days to film due to Olivier's ailing health at the time. Peck recalled that he and Olivier "were lying around on the floor" laughing at the absurdity of having to film such a fight scene at their advanced ages.

=== Extended ending ===
A brief end segment with Bobby Wheelock in a darkroom was restored to some versions in later years. In this alternative ending, after Lieberman burns the list in his hospital bed, the scene transitions to Bobby in a darkroom developing photographs of Lieberman and Mengele, with a piercing glare coming from his steely-blue eyes as he focuses on Mengele's jaguar claw bracelet before fading to the end credits.

== Release ==
The film had 25 minutes cut when released in West Germany, theatrical as well as all subsequent TV, video and some DVD releases. In 1999, by Artisan Entertainment, and 2009 by Lionsgate Home Entertainment, the film was released uncut on DVD in the U.S. and uncut in Germany on its DVDs.

Lew Grade, who partly financed the film, was not happy with the final result, feeling that the ending was too gory. He says he protested but Franklin J. Schaffner, who had final cut rights, overruled him.

In 2015, Shout! Factory released the film on Blu-ray.

== Reception ==
=== Critical response ===
On Rotten Tomatoes, the film has an approval rating of 72% based on 32 reviews, with an average rating of 6.3/10. The site's consensus states: "Its story takes some dubious turns, but a high-calibre cast and a gripping pace fashion The Boys from Brazil into an effective thriller." On Metacritic, the film has a score of 40 out of 100 based on reviews from 7 critics, indicating "mixed or average reviews.

Variety wrote "With two excellent antagonists in Gregory Peck and Lord Laurence Olivier, The Boys from Brazil presents a gripping, suspenseful drama for nearly all of its two hours — then lets go at the end and falls into a heap." Gene Siskel of the Chicago Tribune gave the film one-and-a-half out of four stars and called it "old-fashioned filmmaking at its worst," with "one of the phoniest stories you can imagine." Charles Champlin of the Los Angeles Times wrote "It is penny-dreadful stuff, sumptuously executed but still as shallow as a Saturday serial. One exasperation of The Boys From Brazil is that, even accepting the biological possibility of the premise, the script by Heywood Gould never confronts any of the interesting questions raised." Gary Arnold of The Washington Post called it "admirably crafted and surprisingly effective," and "a snazzy pop entertainment synthesis of accumulating suspense, detective work, pseudoscientific speculation and historical wish fulfillment." Pauline Kael of The New Yorker wrote "If the film wants to be taken as a cautionary fable—another one!—about the ever-present dangers of Nazism, then it should leave viewers with a sense of menace that Mengele's 'boys from Brazil' constitute. Instead, we get Lieberman's fuddy-duddy humanism and vague assurances that the boys are not really dangerous. And this is supposed to be a movie." Jack Kroll of Newsweek wrote that "the thoughts aren't quite deep enough even for a thriller...Heywood Gould's reasonably suspenseful screenplay blows it by suddenly turning Lieberman into a kindly old Jewish uncle instead of a man who is willing to face the tough paradoxes of good and evil."

Scholars have used the film's idea of controlling an individual's genetics and upbringing to illustrate the difficulties of reconciling traditional views of free will with modern neuroscience.

== Accolades ==
- Academy Award for Best Actor – Laurence Olivier (nominated)
- Academy Award for Film Editing – Robert Swink (nominated)
- Academy Award for Original Score – Jerry Goldsmith (nominated)
- Golden Globe Award for Best Motion Picture Actor – Drama – Gregory Peck

Saturn Award Nominations

- Best Science Fiction Film
- Best Actor – Laurence Olivier
- Best Director – Franklin J. Schaffner
- Best Music – Jerry Goldsmith
- Best Supporting Actress – Uta Hagen
- Best Writing – Heywood Gould

Other honors

The film is recognized by American Film Institute in these lists:

- 2001: AFI's 100 Years...100 Thrills – Nominated
- 2003: AFI's 100 Years...100 Heroes & Villains:
  - Dr. Josef Mengele – Nominated Villain

== See also ==
- "Anschluss '77" – Episode of Wonder Woman
- List of cult films – List of films that generated cult following
- Marathon Man – A similar 1976 film, where Laurence Olivier plays a Nazi, a total contrast to his role of playing a Nazi hunter in The Boys from Brazil.
- Murderers Among Us: The Simon Wiesenthal Story (1989)
- River of Death – 1989 American action film
- They Saved Hitler's Brain – 1968 television film directed by David Bradley
- Bionic Commando - A 1998 video game
