= The Boys from Brazil (novel) =

1976 novel by Ira Levin

- First edition
- Author: Ira Levin
- Language: English
- Publisher: Random House
- Publication date: 21 October 1976
- Publication place: United States
- Media type: Print
- Pages: 312 (268 mass market paperback)
- ISBN: 0-394-40267-7
- OCLC: 1818465
- Dewey Decimal: 813/.5/4
- LC Class: PS3523.E7993

The Boys from Brazil is a 1976 thriller novel by American writer Ira Levin. It was made into a film of the same title that was released in 1978.

== Plot ==
Yakov Liebermann is a Nazi hunter (loosely based on Simon Wiesenthal) who runs a center in Vienna that documents crimes against humanity perpetrated during the Holocaust. The waning interest of the Western nations in tracking down Nazi war criminals, and the failure of the bank where he kept his center's funds, has forced him to move the center to his own lodgings.

Then, in September 1974, Liebermann receives a phone call from a young man in Brazil who claims he has just finished tape recording a meeting held by the so-called "Angel of Death", Dr. Josef Mengele, a concentration camp medical doctor who performed horrific experiments on camp victims during World War II. According to the young man, Mengele is reactivating the Kameradenwerk for a strange assignment: sending out six Nazis (all former SS officers) to kill 94 men living in Western Europe and North America, who share a few common traits. All men are civil servants, and all of them have to be killed on or about particular dates, spread over several years. All will be 65 years old at the time of their killing. Before the young man can finish the conversation, he is killed.

Liebermann is hesitant and wonders if the call was a prank. But he investigates and discovers that the killings the young man spoke of are taking place. As he tries to determine why the seemingly unimportant men are being killed, he discovers by coincidence that the children of two of the men are identical. It eventually transpires each of the 94 targets has a son aged 13, a genetic clone of Adolf Hitler planted by Mengele and, through corrupt adoption agency employees, placed with families that have lives similar to Hitler's own upbringing. Mengele wishes to create a new Führer for a revitalized Nazi movement, and is thus trying to ensure that the lives of the clones follow a similar path to Hitler's. Each civil servant father is married to a woman about 23 years younger, and their killing is an attempt to mimic the timing of the death of Hitler's own father. Liebermann makes sufficient progress in his investigation that the Kameradenwerk ends the operation and recalls the six Nazi operatives sent to kill the men. Infuriated, Mengele resolves to complete as many of the killings as he can on his own and travels to the United States.

Liebermann manages to work out who the next intended target is - a man named Henry Wheelock who lives in Pennsylvania - and travels there to warn Wheelock that his life may be in danger. However, Mengele reaches Wheelock first, kills him, and then encounters Liebermann. Liebermann is shot by Mengele; before Mengele can kill him, Liebermann manages to free the Wheelock family's attack dogs, who restrain Mengele. When Wheelock's 13-year-old adopted son, Bobby Wheelock, one of the Hitler clones, arrives to this scene, Mengele pleads for him to join Mengele in his plans and tells the boy about his parentage. The boy, deeming him insane, instead orders the family's attack dogs to kill him, and makes a deal with the injured Liebermann that he will call for help right away as long as Liebermann promises to never disclose that the boy ordered the dogs to kill Mengele. The plan is thus halted, but 18 Hitler clones have already lost their fathers.

Liebermann destroys the list of the 94 clones so that a militant group known as the Young Jewish Defenders (based on the Jewish Defense League) will not be able to kill what may still turn out to be harmless boys, declaring that morality demanded that they not stoop to the Nazis' level by killing children. However, the book ends with one such cloned boy, an amateur artist, drawing a scene of someone moving large numbers of people much as Hitler had.

== Reviews ==
The New York Times called it an "appallingly inventive plot."

In a 2011 review for The Guardian, Sophia Martelli wrote: "Although the book is now fairly dated, at the time of publication the inclusion of real or near-real characters (Mengele's nemesis Liebermann is a conflation of Nazi hunters such as Simon Wiesenthal and Serge Klarsfeld, who attempted to capture Mengele in South America) must have added a chilling dimension. What scares today is Levin's premise based on biological engineering: in the 1970s, although scientifically possible, Mengele's plan belonged firmly in the realm of fiction; now it's not nearly so far-fetched."

The book became a best seller.

== Adaptations ==
In 1978, the book was adapted into a movie directed by Franklin J. Scaffner, written by Levin and Heywood Gould, with Gregory Peck, Laurence Olivier and James Mason starring. The movie was well-received, and was nominated for three Academy Awards.

In 2025, Netflix ordered a miniseries adaptation from Peter Morgan, with Jeremy Strong leading the cast as Yakov Liebermann.
