= Rosemary's Baby (miniseries) =

2014 American television miniseries

- Promotional poster
- Genre: Horror
- Based on: Rosemary's Baby and Son of Rosemary by Ira Levin
- Written by: Scott Abbott; James Wong
- Directed by: Agnieszka Holland
- Starring: Zoe Saldaña; Patrick J. Adams; Jason Isaacs; Carole Bouquet
- Music by: Antoni Komasa-Lazarkiewicz
- Country of origin: United States
- Original language: English
- No. of episodes: 2

Production
- Producers: Joshua D. Maurer; Alixandre Witlin; David A. Stern; Zoe Saldaña; Cisely Saldana; Mariel Saldana; Tom Patricia; Robert Bernacchi
- Cinematography: Michel Amathieu
- Editors: Amy E. Duddleston; Brian Berdan
- Running time: 170 minutes
- Production companies: City Entertainment; KippSter Entertainment; Lionsgate Television

Original release
- Network: NBC
- Release: May 11 – May 15, 2014

Rosemary's Baby is a 2014 two-part, four-hour television miniseries adaptation of Ira Levin's best-selling 1967 horror novel of the same name and its 1997 sequel Son of Rosemary. It stars Zoe Saldaña. Produced by NBC, the series was directed by Agnieszka Holland. Unlike earlier versions, it is set in Paris rather than New York City. The work was not well received by critics, many of whom said that it was stretched to fill two two-hour timeslots. Although there are several notable changes, this miniseries is considered to be a faithful updating of the original 1968 film adaptation.

== Plot ==
After suffering a miscarriage, Rosemary and Guy Woodhouse leave New York City for Paris, hoping to make a fresh start. A series of serendipitous events lead them to befriend affluent couple Margaux and Roman Castevet, who invite them to live in their prestigious apartment building. While Guy appreciates Roman taking him under his wing, Rosemary is overwhelmed by the Castevets' interest in their lives.

She finds evidence of the previous couple who lived in their apartment, and after going to Commissioner Fontaine with her suspicions, learns that the woman, Nena, died by suicide. Following a lead, Rosemary finds Nena's priest, who tells her the apartment building has a dark past, and one of the tenants is a Satanist billionaire named Steven Marcato who eats women's hearts. The priest hangs himself soon after, which prompts Fontaine to investigate.

When Guy's career flourishes, he suggests to Rosemary that they try to get pregnant again. On the night they plan to conceive, Rosemary drinks Margaux's herbal brew and passes out. In a dreamlike state, Rosemary sees herself being raped by a strange man, while being watched by Guy, Margaux, Roman, and the Castevets' friends. Weeks later, Rosemary learns she is pregnant, but her health deteriorates and she is neglected by Guy, who is reluctant to touch Rosemary and has been spending more time with Roman.

Guy is angered when he learns Rosemary went to visit another doctor, as encouraged by her friend Julie. Guy visits Julie and secretly takes her crucifix necklace; not long afterward, Julie dies in a kitchen accident. Rosemary's pains suddenly disappear, and the rest of the pregnancy proceeds well.

Late into the pregnancy, Fontaine is still investigating the Marcato case and warns Rosemary to keep her eyes open. Rosemary discovers a secret door in their closet, which leads to a study containing books on the occult. Rosemary takes one of the books, which is about witchcraft and contains a handwritten note "It's an anagram!" above a page on Steven Marcato. Rosemary shares her suspicions with Guy that Roman Castevet is Steven Marcato, and that the Castevets are witches with sinister designs on their baby, but Guy insists that she is being paranoid. While searching for their passports, Rosemary discovers Julie's crucifix necklace and suspects that Guy is part of the conspiracy.

Rosemary sneaks out of the apartment to meet Fontaine, but he is run over by a truck while Rosemary watches. Rosemary goes to Dr. Bernard, Julie's friend, but he thinks that she is delusional and calls Guy. Rosemary is taken back to her apartment, where she has a panic attack and is sedated just as she is going into labour. She wakes up three days later in a hospital and is told that the baby died and that its body was cremated. After being discharged, Rosemary leaves Guy and declares that she is going back to New York.

While packing her things in the apartment, Rosemary hears a baby's cries and starts lactating. She goes through the secret door to the Castevets' apartment, where she finds Guy, the Castevets and their friends standing around a crib containing her baby. Rosemary is disturbed by the baby's demonic eyes, and is told that its father is Satan and the baby is their Prince. Roman encourages Rosemary to be the baby's mother, and she lifts her son out of the crib to nurse him. The film ends with Rosemary pushing her son in a pram, and when passersby admire him, she says, "He's perfect."

== Cast ==
- Zoe Saldaña as Rosemary Woodhouse
- Patrick J. Adams as Guy Woodhouse
- Jason Isaacs as Roman Castevet
- Carole Bouquet as Margaux Castevet
- Olivier Rabourdin as Commissioner Fontaine
- Christina Cole as Julie
- François Civil as Jacques
- Frédéric Pierrot as Father Tekem
- Wojciech Pszoniak as Monsieur Wees
- Joseph Malerba as Paul
- Oisín Stack as Dr. Bernard
- Victoire Bélézy as Nena
- Stefano Cassetti as The Blue-Eyed Man/The Devil

== Production ==
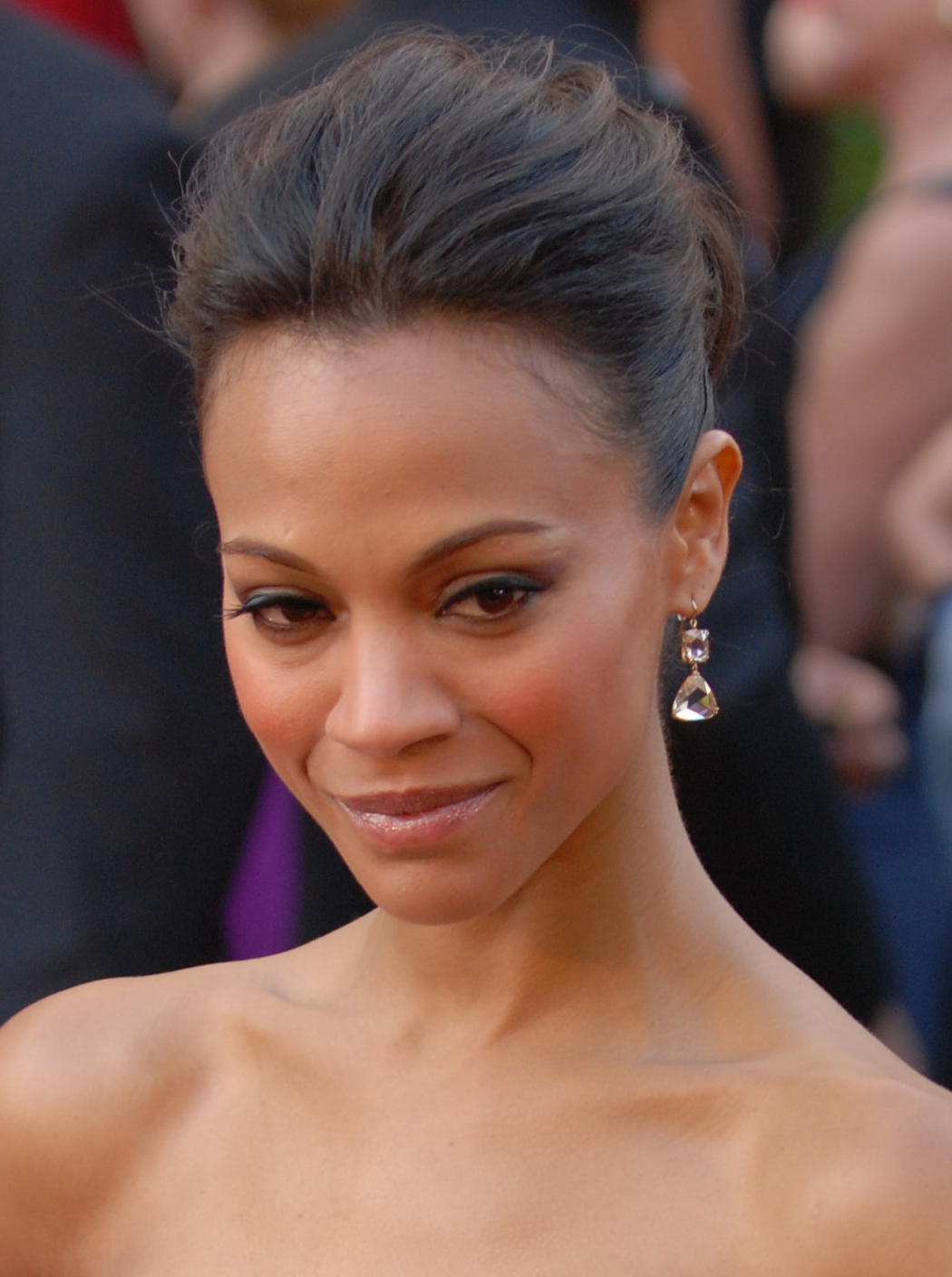
Zoe Saldaña plays the lead character, Rosemary Woodhouse

Saldaña signed on to the project on January 8, 2014. Director Holland was a three-time Academy Award nominee and the original film had earned Academy Award nominations. Saldaña signed on with the expectations that fans of the original would not like the adaptation, but she was lured by the Paris setting and more importantly the opportunity to live and work in Paris for three months. Jason Isaacs and Patrick J. Adams joined the cast on January 20. Holland's daughter Kasia Adamik served as the second unit director. Scott Abbott and James Wong wrote the 2014 adapted screenplay.

Unlike the novel and film, the miniseries is set and shot in Paris rather than New York City. While the new adaptation was bloodier than the original movie version, it attempted to be more sophisticated by touching on themes such as "post-feminist meditation on the loss of control that women feel with pregnancy and on the seduction of money and power". Whereas the original movie used the Omaha native housewife transplanted in New York City, the new adaptation presented Saldaña's Rosemary as a ballet dancer who was the primary wage-earner and who left New York after a miscarriage to start over in Paris with her husband during his one-year teaching job at the Sorbonne.

== Episodes ==
No.	Title	Directed by	Written by	Original release date	U.S. viewers (millions)
1	"Night 1"	Agnieszka Holland	Scott Abbott & James Wong	May 11, 2014	3.68
After suffering a miscarriage, a young married couple, Guy and Rosemary Woodhouse decide to create a new life for each other by moving to Paris, where Guy lands a teaching job at the Sorbonne. The couple soon meet and befriend Roman and Margaux Castevet, a mysterious older couple living in their lavish new apartment building, which Rosemary discovers, has a haunted past.
2	"Night 2"	Agnieszka Holland	Scott Abbott & James Wong	May 15, 2014	3.26
Roman and Margaux take a strange interest in the couple after Rosemary becomes pregnant. Also when Guy finds success through writing, tragedy strikes Rosemary's personal life and her health starts to decline drastically during the course of her pregnancy, making her believe there is something wrong with the baby.

== Reception ==
On review aggregator Rotten Tomatoes, the show held a 31% approval rating with an average score of 4.8/10, based on 35 reviews. The consensus read: "Although the Parisian setting and special effects are impressive, this Rosemary's Baby remake resorts to sensationalism and gore." At Metacritic, the show had a score of 51 out of 100, based on 27 reviews, which indicates a "mixed or average" response.

Alessandra Stanley of The New York Times, who called the miniseries a "surprisingly clever remake", felt that the choice of Paris as the setting was not only "one of the best things" about the remake, but it works well with the theme of conflict with neighbors. Furthermore, she noted that it was reasonable that Rosemary would be naive and dependent because of her unfamiliarity with Paris as a newcomer. Stanley wrote that the host couple, French sophisticates Margaux and Roman Castevet, were completely different from the one in Roman Polanski's original. Although she said the adaptation took liberties with the source material, James Poniewozik of Time said the adaptation "keeps its essential shape and plot" in comparison to the original film, an opinion shared by Hank Stuever of The Washington Post, who wrote that the new adaptation was "surprisingly and even satisfyingly true to the old movie". Poniewozik stated that although director Holland had successfully directed complex and lively episodes of The Wire and Treme, this adaptation was "leaden and slack", which may have been due to an attempt to fill two two-hour time slots. Stuever also wrote that it was "way too long", and added that the show lacked suspense. Poniewozik characterized Rosemary and Guy as "anesthetically generic" without a "complex relationship"; he likened the miniseries to a "lifestyle show" that becomes a "slasher movie". Despite some "redeeming notes", he ultimately called it "too dull". Stuever noted that the 2014 adaptation was set in "the hyper-aware boutique pregnancy" era, and pointed out one modernization that eased Rosemary's burden: Google Image searches on Satan. David Bianculli of NPR felt the shift to Paris was unnecessary and that the adaptation was "neither refreshing nor original"; he summed it up as "just dreadful". He described Saldaña's Rosemary as more appealing, but no smarter, than Mia Farrow's.
