= Rosemary's Baby (novel) =

1967 horror novel by Ira Levin

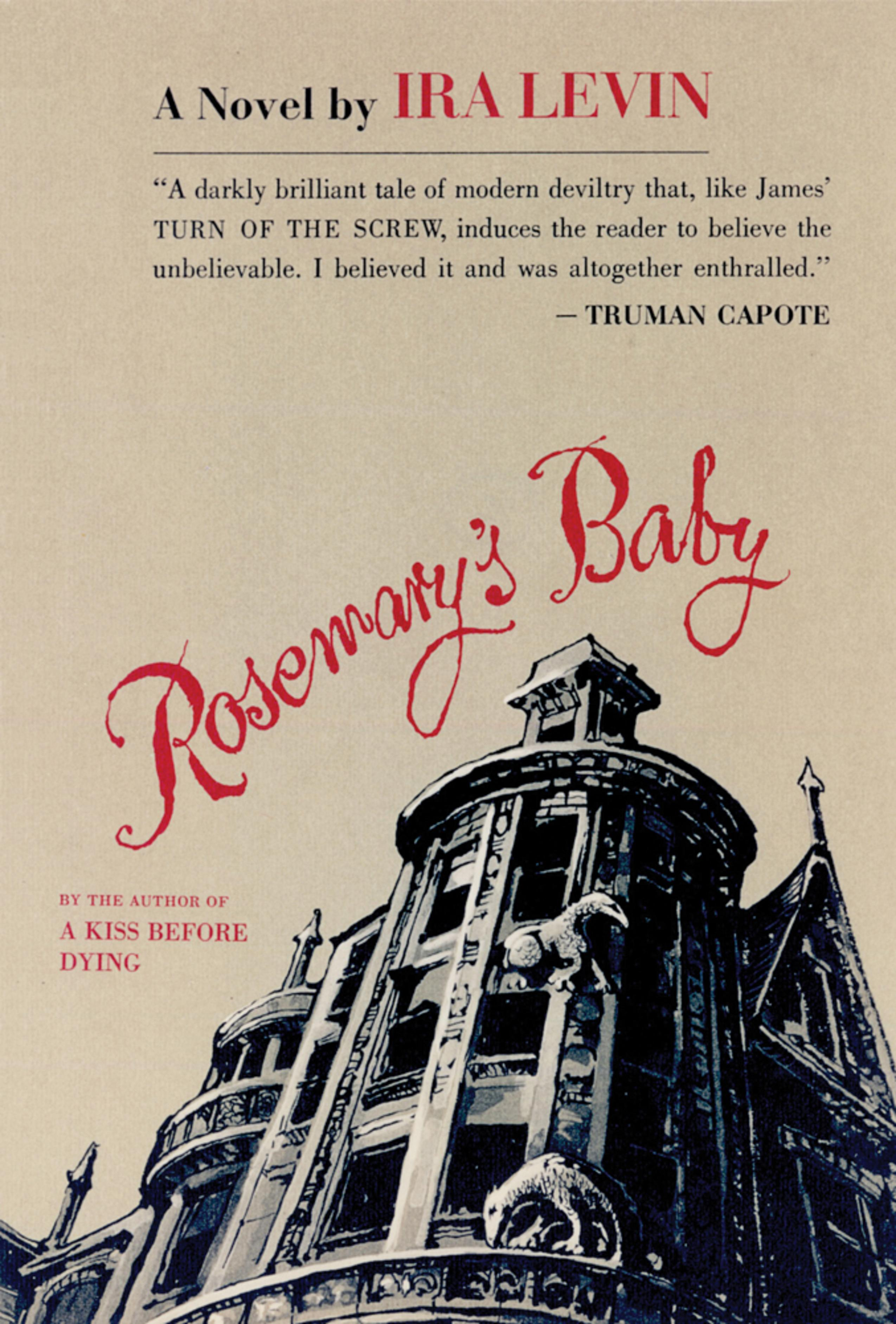
- Cover of 1967 first edition
- Author: Ira Levin
- Language: English
- Genre: Horror
- Publisher: Random House
- Publication date: April 13, 1967
- Publication place: United States
- Media type: Print (hardcover and paperback) and Audio Book
- Pages: 245
- Followed by: Son of Rosemary

Rosemary's Baby is a 1967 horror novel by American writer Ira Levin; it was his second published book. The novel follows a young couple who move into an apartment building, where they befriend an older couple in the neighboring apartment, who become increasingly involved when Rosemary becomes pregnant. It was the best-selling horror novel of the 1960s, selling over four million copies.

The high popularity of the novel was a catalyst for a boom in popularity for horror fiction, which achieved enormous commercial success in its wake. In 1968, Roman Polanski adapted the novel as a film of the same name, amongst other adaptations.

== Plot ==
The book centers on Rosemary Woodhouse, a young woman who moves into the Bramford, a historic Gothic Revival-style New York City apartment building, with her husband, Guy, a struggling actor. Guy has so far appeared only in small roles in the stage plays Luther, Nobody Loves an Albatross, and various TV commercials. A friend warns the pair that the Bramford has a disturbing history involving witchcraft and murder, but they discount this. Rosemary wants to start a family, but Guy prefers waiting until his career is more established.

Rosemary meets Terry Gionoffrio, a girl about her own age, who is staying with one of their neighbors, the Castevets, whom Rosemary and Guy have yet to meet. They took her in off the streets and helped her not only get clean but also help her with furthering her education. After Terry is found dead, presumably from suicide, they finally meet the neighbors Minnie and Roman Castevet, an eccentric, elderly couple, who welcome Rosemary and Guy to the Bramford. Rosemary finds them meddlesome and annoying, but Guy begins frequently visiting them.

After the lead actor in a new stage play suddenly goes blind, Guy is cast in the role. Immediately afterward, Guy unexpectedly agrees with Rosemary that they should have their first child. That night, Rosemary dreams of a rough sexual encounter with a huge, inhuman creature with yellow eyes. The next morning Rosemary finds claw marks on her breasts and groin, which Guy dismisses as resulting from his hangnail, which he has cut.

A few weeks later, Rosemary finds that she is pregnant and the Castevets convince her to see their doctor, Abraham Sapirstein, who is a celebrity doctor. She agrees but falls severely ill with intense abdominal pain and nausea causing weight loss, but her concerns are ignored by others and told it will pass. Her doctor and Minnie feed her strange and foul concoctions, and Rosemary also develops a peculiar craving for raw meat.

Guy's performance in the play garners favorable notices, and other increasingly significant roles follow. Guy soon begins talking about a career in Hollywood.

Rosemary and Guy throw a party for their old friends and the women convince Rosemary she should see Dr. Hill in order to get a second opinion about the pain she's having and her weight loss. She promises but later that night the intense pain and nausea suddenly disappear, so she doesn't follow through on the visit.

Rosemary's friend, Edward "Hutch" Hutchins, falls into a mysterious coma the night before he's supposed to meet with Rosemary to discuss something he feels is important. Months later, before he passes, he regains consciousness and has a friend send Rosemary a book on witchcraft, leading to her discovery that Roman Castevet is the leader of a Satanic coven. She suspects her unborn baby is wanted as a sacrifice to the devil.

She begins to believe Guy is also involved with the coven when she finds that he lied to her and that his behavior has become odd. She then goes to Dr. Hill to get his help, but thinking she's delusional, he calls Guy and Dr. Sapirstein. Threatening that they would place her in a mental institution if she didn't come with them, the two take her home and restrain her, where she ends up giving birth.

Everyone lies to her that the birth was stillborn but a couple of weeks later she hears a baby crying. Guy tells her that it's a new couple on the floor above but she realizes every time she hears the cry, one of the others comes to use the breast pump on her. She discovers a hidden door leading to the Castevets apartment and finally sees her child but realizes that they do not want to sacrifice him, but that she has given birth to the son of Satan. After her initial disgust and horror wear off, she begins to feel motherly towards him and changes his name from Adrian to Andrew.

== Publication ==
Ira Levin published his debut novel A Kiss Before Dying in 1953, which won the Edgar Award for Best First Novel in 1954. His sophomore novel was Rosemary's Baby, which was published by Random House on April 13, 1967.

Levin was inspired by the idea of a woman pregnant with a fetus which was not human — he briefly considered having the father be an extraterrestrial but felt that this would be too similar to John Wyndham's The Midwich Cuckoos. Having decided on Manhattan as the setting, specifically the Bramford apartment building, which was inspired by The Dakota, Levin used contemporary newspapers to include real world events in the novel, such as the 1966 transit strike, the 1965 mayoral election and the 1965 visit of the Pope, which would lend a realistic air to the story.

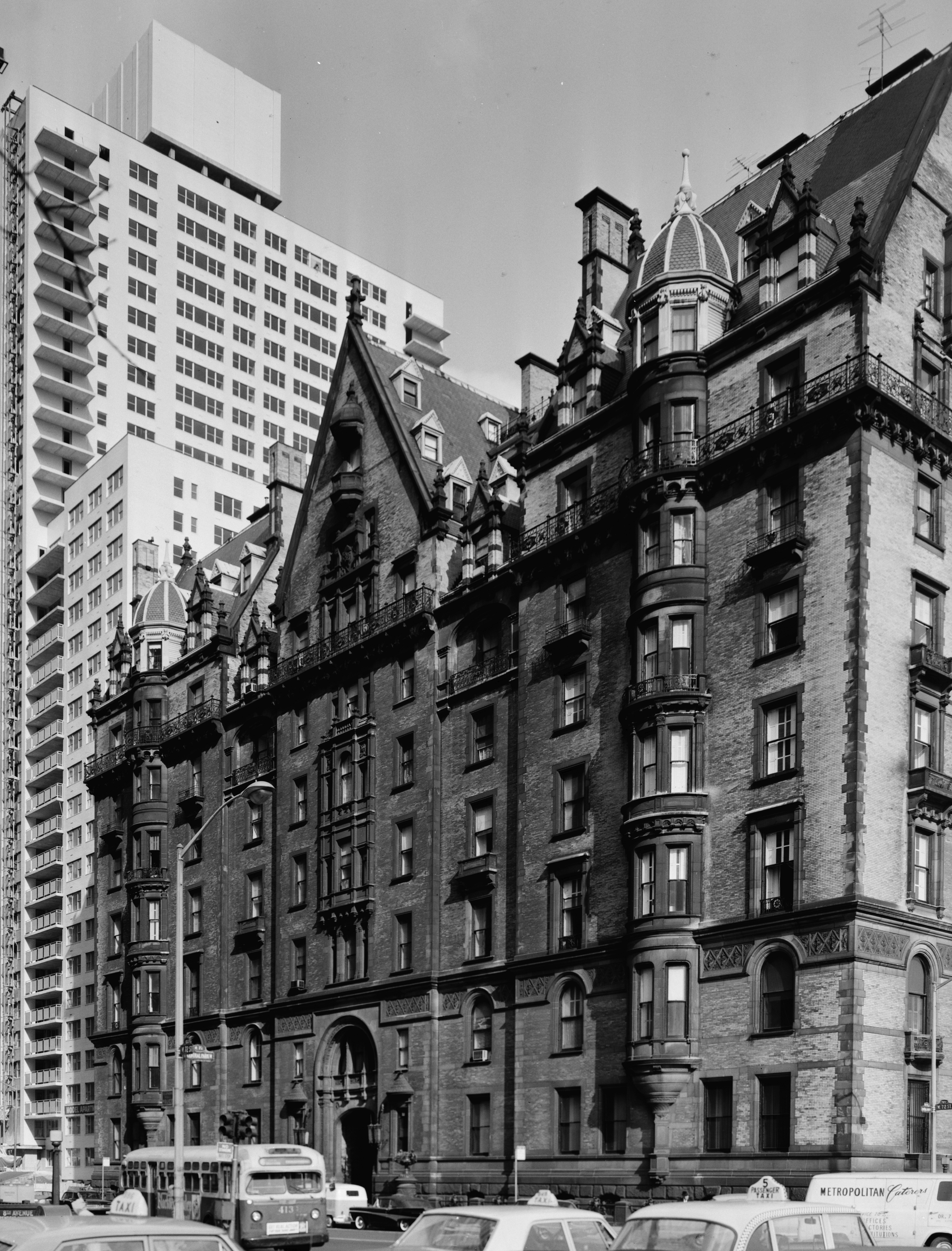
The Dakota (pictured in 1965) served as the inspiration for the Bramford

== Critical reception ==
=== Contemporary reviews ===
On the first edition dust jacket, Truman Capote compared the novel to Henry James's The Turn of the Screw, however in a review for The New York Times, Eliot Fremont-Smith favored a comparison to early Evelyn Waugh or late Thorne Smith. The novel was a best-seller, selling over four-million copies and becoming the best-selling horror novel of the 1960s. It received rave reviews upon its publication, including a starred review from Kirkus and declarations that it was a modern masterpiece.

=== Later analysis ===
The writer Cherry Wilder wrote that "Rosemary's Baby is one of the most perfectly crafted thrillers ever written". Horror scholar Gary Crawford described Rosemary's Baby as "a genuine masterpiece". David Pringle described the novel as "this sly, seductive impeccably-written horror novel ... is an expertly constructed story, a playwright's book, in which every physical detail and line of dialogue counts." Rosemary's Baby was considered a forerunner to the fiction of Stephen King and Peter Straub, and the novel and film were credited with inspiring the popularity of mass-market horror fiction in the 1970s and 1980s and later successful film series such as The Exorcist and The Omen.

== Sequel ==
Thirty years later, Levin published a sequel to the novel, titled Son of Rosemary (1997). Levin dedicated it to Mia Farrow.

== Censorship ==
Rosemary's Baby was published in Spanish translation during the Francoist dictatorship. The Francoist censors cut passages from this translation, claiming the cut passages "glorified Satan". As of April 2019, all the Spanish-language editions of the book still retain these cuts.

== Adaptations ==
The film rights were sold prior to publication to William Castle. In 1968, the novel was adapted as a film, starring Mia Farrow, with John Cassavetes as Guy. Ruth Gordon, who played Minnie Castevet, won an Academy Award for Best Supporting Actress. Roman Polanski, who wrote and directed the film, was nominated for Best Writing, Screenplay Based on Material from Another Medium.

A television film sequel to the Polanski film, Look What's Happened to Rosemary's Baby, was produced in 1976.

In 2014, the novel was adapted as an NBC television miniseries, with Zoe Saldaña as Rosemary and Patrick J. Adams as Guy. Set in Paris, the two-part series was directed by Agnieszka Holland.

Paramount produced a prequel in 2024 titled Apartment 7A, starring Julia Garner and Dianne Wiest.
