= Son of Rosemary =

1997 horror novel by Ira Levin

- Cover of the first edition, published by Dutton
- Author: Ira Levin
- Language: English
- Publisher: Dutton
- Publication date: 1997
- ISBN: 0-525-94374-9 (first edition)
- Dewey Decimal: 813.54
- LC Class: PS3523.E7993 S66

Son of Rosemary is a 1997 horror novel by American writer Ira Levin. It is the sequel to his 1967 novel, Rosemary's Baby.

== Plot ==
The novel begins in November 1999, with Rosemary Woodhouse waking up in a long-term care facility. She has lain in a coma since 1973. Wholly unharmed, Rosemary soon learns that her coma resulted from a spell the coven cast on her when they discovered that she planned to run away with her young son, Andy (who was 7 years old at the time). In her absence, Andy was raised by Minnie and Roman Castevet, the leaders of the coven. Rosemary recovered only after the coven's last member died.

Rosemary finds that Andy, now 33 years old, is the popular and charismatic leader of an international charitable organization. Mother and son are reunited, and Rosemary instantly becomes world-famous both for her remarkable recovery and as Andy's long-lost mother. Rosemary is also struck and puzzled by a repeated reference to "roast mules", an anagram that many people continually mention.

Andy assures his mother that he has rebelled against the coven's evil influence. He says he uses his powers to achieve world peace, but a long chain of deadly events leads Rosemary to believe that her son has unwittingly become the Antichrist and is ushering in the end of the world. Her fears are proven when a candle-lighting event that Andy has organized to celebrate the new millennium unleashes a deadly virus that destroys all human life. In the wake of the destruction, Satan returns to Earth and drags Rosemary into Hell.

Rosemary abruptly awakens to find that it is 1965 again and that she is still married to Guy Woodhouse. The events of the entire first novel and that of the second up to that point have all been Rosemary's vivid dream. Rosemary and Guy receive a call from Rosemary's friend Edward "Hutch" Hutchins (who died in her dream), who offers the couple a rent-free apartment in the Dakota Apartments (the model for the Bramford, their apartment building in the first novel) for one year. The couple are delighted at the offer, until Hutch makes a remark about lighting candles and "roast mules" that causes Rosemary to regard her dream as a possible forewarning of future events.

== Reception ==
The book received withering pans from most critics. Writing in Entertainment Weekly, Alexandra Jacobs called it "senseless balderdash, a pity when you consider how gracefully Rosemary's Baby flitted between the real and the fantastic, the paranoid and the paranormal. This resurrection only besmirches a devilishly good author's track record." Publishers Weekly concurred: "After the nifty setup, the story drifts rather than lopes, with little suspense. There's little originality here either."

== Television adaptation ==
Rosemary's Baby and Son of Rosemary were adapted into the miniseries Rosemary's Baby, starring Zoe Saldaña. It aired on NBC in two parts, on May 11 and May 15, 2014.
