= No Time for Sergeants (The United States Steel Hour) =

- The United States Steel Hour episode
- Andy Griffith (left) and Harry Clark
- Episode no.: Season 2 Episode 14
- Directed by: Alex Segal
- Written by: Ira Levin
- Original air date: March 15, 1955

Guest appearances
- Andy Griffith as Will Stockdale; Harry Clark as Sgt. King; Robert Emhardt as Major; Eddie LeRoy as Ben Whitledge

Episode chronology
| ← Previous "A Man in the Corner" | Next → "Scandal at Peppernut" |

"No Time for Sergeants" was an American television play that was broadcast by the American Broadcasting Company (ABC) on March 15, 1955, as part of the television series, United States Steel Hour. The production starred Andy Griffith who made his television debut in the production. The production was nominated for Emmy Awards for best program of the year and for Alex Segal as the best director in a live series.

== Plot ==
The play opens with Will Stockdale sitting on a bench and explaining the circumstances under which he was drafted into the military. He plays the Jew's harp and sings as the opening credits play.

Will is an unsophisticated "plowboy" from Georgia. He introduces the audience to the barracks. Irving has been put in charge of the barracks even though, according to Will's understanding, Irving has been "sick with ROTC for a whole year." Ben Whitledge, a short, skinny soldier with glasses and an ill-fitting uniform, becomes Stockdale's bunk mate. On learning that Irving's not sick, Will confronts him and "busts him up some."

Will and Ben are assigned to the air force and take a train to their new barracks. They are assigned to Sgt. King. Will explains to Sgt. King that he and Ben are leaving because they prefer to be in the infantry. Sgt. King assigns Will as the permanent barracks orderly. Will spends a week cleaning, polishing, and painting the entire barracks.

The Captain inspects the barracks and has never seen them so clean. Will gives Sgt. King credit for making him permanent barracks orderly. The captain orders Sgt. King to get Will classified. Will goes through classification tests. He then meets with the psychiatrist who is unable to provoke the amiable Will.

A WAF captain scolds Will and Ben for rough-housing. Will can't believe there's a women's air force. Ben tells Will he shouldn't notice whether a captain is a man or a woman. When Sgt. King points out the new captain, Will says he doesn't see a woman, just a captain. Sgt. King worries that Will has failed the eye test.

Sgt. King has the men carry Will out of the barracks to the Purple Grotto bar where they try to get the "guest of honor" drunk. Will is accustomed to drinking moonshine laced with kerosene and stays sober as Sgt. King gets drunk instead. Will returns to the barracks and helps Ben prepare for inspection. As the Colonel conducts his inspection, a drunk Sgt. King returns and is confronted by the Colonel. Will and Ben are assigned to gunnery school. Sgt. King is demoted to private and assigned to gunnery school with Will.

== Cast ==
The following actors received screen credit for their performances:

- Andy Griffith as Will Stockdale
- Harry Clark as Sgt. King
- Robert Emhardt as Major (the psychiatrist)
- Eddie LeRoy as Ben Whitledge
- Alexander Clark as Captain
- Arthur Storch as Irving
- Bob Hastings as Lucky
- G. Albert Smith as Colonel
- Joe Brown Jr. as Infantry Sergeant
- Adina Rice as WAF Captain
- Thomas Volk as PFC
- George Kilroy as Soldier

== Production ==
The play was produced by the Theatre Guild and broadcast on the ABC television network on March 15, 1955. It was aired as the 14th episode of the second season of the United States Steel Hour.

Alex Segal, one of the leading directors in the Golden Age of Television, was the producer and director. Ira Levin wrote the teleplay based on the 1954 novel No Time for Sergeants by Mac Hyman. Albert Heschong was the production designer and James McNaughton the art director. S. Mark Smith was the editor.

No Time for Sergeants was nominated for an Emmy Award as the best program of the year, but lost out to the Producers' Showcase presentation of Peter Pan. Alex Segal was also nominated for an Emmy Award as best director in a live series.

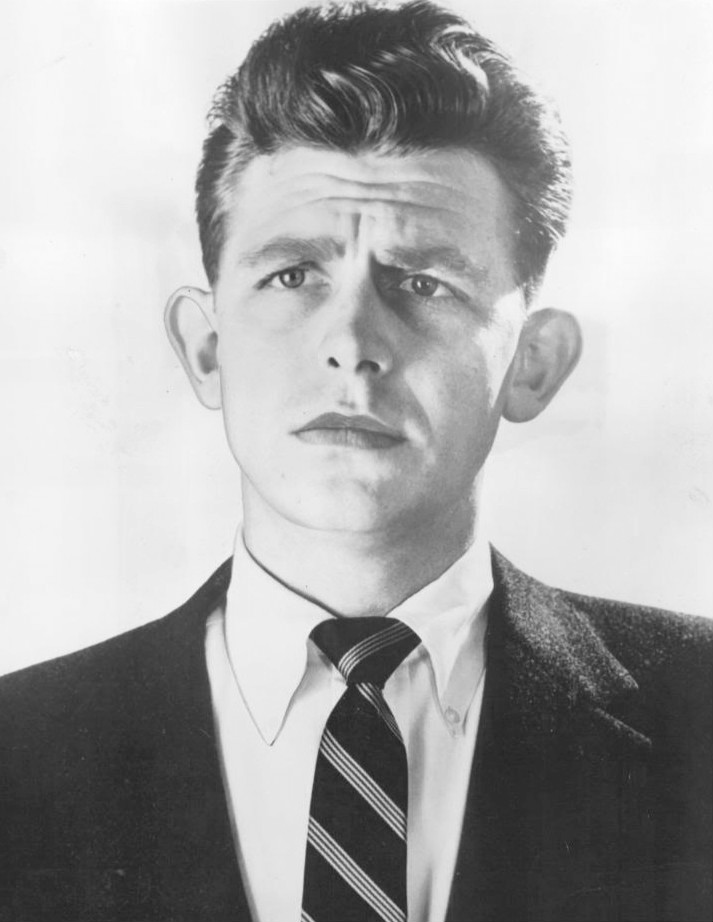
Andy Griffith in 1955

With the success of the television production, the story was subsequently adapted into a Broadway play and a 1958 feature film of the same name with Griffith again in the role of Will Stockdale.

== Reception ==
In The New York Times, J. P. Shanley called it "good, rowdy fun". The production was the television debut for Andy Griffith. Shanley wrote that Griffith was "ideally cast" as Will Stockdale but questioned "whether he is versatile enough to qualify for other important roles."

Roger Thames of The Birmingham News called it "one of the year's happier offerings" and opined that Andy Griffith "made the show."

Donald Kirkley called it "one of the funniest plays of this season" and noted, based on Griffith's "hilarious performance", television may have a new star.

In The Philadelphia Inquirer, Leo Mishkin called it "as likable and amusing a comedy as could be desired." He described Griffith as "a bat-eared actor . . . who may very well become a new comedy find in the television business."

John Crosby of the New York Herald praised Alex Segal's talent for directing comedy and added: "It is not often that an hour passes so swiftly on television."
