= Adventures of Huckleberry Finn (disambiguation) =

Adventures of Huckleberry Finn is a novel by Mark Twain.

Adventures of Huckleberry Finn may also refer to:

- The Adventures of Huckleberry Finn (1939 film), starring Mickey Rooney
- The Adventures of Huckleberry Finn (1955 film)
- The Adventures of Huckleberry Finn (1960 film), directed by Michael Curtiz and starring Eddie Hodges
- "The Adventures of Huckleberry Finn", a 1955 episode of the TV anthology series Climax!
- The Adventures of Huck Finn (1993 film), starring Elijah Wood and Courtney B. Vance

== See also ==
- The New Adventures of Huckleberry Finn, a 1968 live action/animated television series
- Huckleberry no Bōken, a 1976 Japanese anime
- Huckleberry Finn and His Friends (1979 TV series), starring Ian Tracey
- Tom and Huck, a 1995 film starring Jonathan Taylor Thomas and Brad Renfro
- Huckleberry Finn (disambiguation)
