= Gwyn Hyman Rubio =

American author (born 1949)

- Born: August 7, 1949 (age 77); Macon, Georgia
- Education: Florida State University, U.S.
- Known for: Writing, Icy Sparks
- Spouse: Angel Rubio (1978-present)
- Website: http://www.gwynhymanrubio.com

Gwyn Hyman Rubio (born August 7, 1949) is an American author, best known for her novel Icy Sparks.

== Early life ==
Gwyn Ellen Hyman was born in Macon, Georgia and raised in Cordele to parents Gwendolyn Holt Hyman and Mac Hyman, author of No Time for Sergeants. She graduated from Florida State University in 1971 with a degree in English. She then joined the Peace Corps, where she met her husband Angel and spent several years working as a teacher in Costa Rica. After returning to the U.S. and settling in Kentucky she became interested in writing, ultimately receiving a Master of Fine Arts in Creative Writing from Warren Wilson College in 1986. She currently resides in Versailles, Kentucky.

== Career ==
She wrote for a decade before her first novel Icy Sparks was published in 1998. Drawing from Rubio's own childhood struggle with epilepsy, the book follows a girl in rural 1950s Kentucky as she develops the symptoms of Tourette syndrome. Icy Sparks received favorable reviews from critics, but sales were modest until it was selected for Oprah's Book Club in 2001. Her 2005 novel, The Woodsman's Daughter, takes place in 1800s Georgia and tells the story of Dalia Miller, the oldest daughter of a turpentine farmer whose past affects his entire family. Rubio also wrote a third novel which was never published. Rubio's latest novel, published in October 2014, Love and Ordinary Creatures, follows a cockatoo named Caruso as he tries to win over the affections of his owner in 1990s North Carolina.

== Publications ==
- Sharing Power
- Icy Sparks (1998)
- The Woodsman's Daughter (2005)
- Love and Ordinary Creatures (2014)

== Awards and honors ==
- Cecil Hackney literary award (for "Little Saint")
- Kentucky Arts Council grant
- Kentucky Foundation for Women grant
- "The Next Wave of Great Literary Voices" in the Discover Great New Writers program (for Icy Sparks)
- Book Sense Pick (for The Woodsman's Daughter)
