= Heschong =

Heschong is a surname. Notable people with the surname include:

- Albert Heschong (1919–2001), American production designer
- Gregg Heschong, American cinematographer and television director
- Lisa Heschong, American Architect, Author, and founding Principal of the Heschong Mahone Group (HMG)
- Eric Heschong, American artist
