= Sammy Jackson =

American actor (1937–1995)

Sammy Jackson (August 18, 1937 – April 26, 1995) was an American actor, known particularly for his roles reflecting rural life, and a country music disc jockey, although he also played pop-standards during 1983 at Los Angeles's KMPC. He also recorded several 45 RPM singles in country and rockabilly styles between 1959 and 1965.

== Biography and persona ==
Born in Henderson, North Carolina, Jackson wished to be an actor and moved to California working as a shipping clerk but was contracted to Warner Brothers where he appeared saying one line in the film No Time for Sergeants. He appeared in the syndicated American Civil War drama Gray Ghost and on the Warner Brothers Television series 77 Sunset Strip starring Efrem Zimbalist, Jr., and in the TV series Maverick, opposite Jack Kelly in the episode "Trooper Maverick" as Private Heaven. In 1973, he appeared in the TV series Adam 12.

== No Time for Sergeants ==
When Jackson read that Warner Brothers was going to produce a 1964 ABC television sitcom, No Time for Sergeants, he wrote directly to Jack L. Warner saying that he was the best choice for the role and asked Warner to examine a certain Maverick episode as proof. Ten days later Jackson was told to come to the studio to test for the role. Jackson won the role over several actors including the better known Will Hutchins, a Warner Brothers television contract star who had played Sugarfoot and also had been in the No Time for Sergeants film.

The series was produced by George Burns's production company and shown in the UK on ITV from 1965 to 1969.

== Other roles ==
Jackson also appeared in None but the Brave for Frank Sinatra as a Marine who makes friends with an enemy soldier by swapping his cigarettes for the Japanese's soldiers' fish catch. In 1966 Jackson starred in unsold television pilots in the title role of Li'l Abner and also playing alongside Groucho Marx in 1967's Rhubarb. Jackson also had a role in The Night of the Grizzly, both feature films had Howard W. Koch as a producer.

With film roles for "hillbillies" drying up, Jackson began working on-air in radio in 1968 while also acting in a number of motion pictures and doing guest roles in television series. Television writer Larry Brody recalled meeting Jackson and writing a television pilot for him. In 1979 Sammy was also a guest on The Dukes of Hazzard premiere season 12th episode 'Route 7-11' playing a casino tough in the back of a rolling 18-wheeler. During the 1980s, Jackson worked for a radio station in Las Vegas and briefly played country music on KLAC, Los Angeles. In 1992, he appeared in the pilot film, Casino (not to be confused with the better-known movie, Casino).

Sammy Jackson died of heart failure at the age of 57 in 1995.

== Partial filmography ==
- No Time for Sergeants (1958) - Inductee (uncredited)
- None but the Brave (1965) - Cpl. Craddock
- The Night of the Grizzly (1966) - Cal Curry
- The Fastest Guitar Alive (1967) - Steve
- The Virginian (1968) (TV) saison 06 épisode 17 : (Jed) :
- The Boatniks (1970) - Garlotti
- Norwood (1970) - Wayne T.E.B. Walker
- The Million Dollar Duck (1971) - Frisby
- Country Music (1972) - Himself
- Shame, Shame on the Bixby Boys (1978)
- Another Stakeout (1993) - Gaetano (final film role)
