= Weaver Levy =

American actor

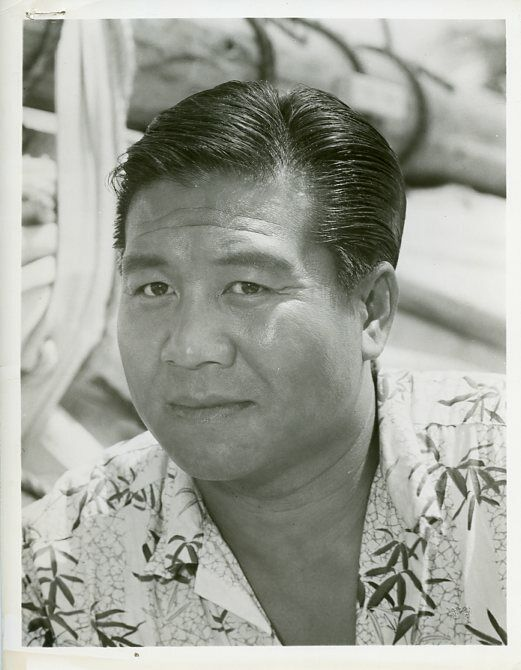
- Levy c. 1959 in a publicity photo for Adventures in Paradise (1959–1962)
- Born: Weaver Kay Levy; January 14, 1925; Los Angeles, California, USA
- Died: February 8, 2018 (aged 93); Murrieta, California, USA
- Occupation: Actor
- Years active: 1945–1981

Weaver Levy (January 14, 1925 – February 8, 2018) was a Chinese American character actor who had a long career in Hollywood that began in the 1940s and continued through the early 1980s. He was best known for his main role in the TV series Adventures in Paradise.

== Biography ==
Weaver was born in Los Angeles, California, to Charles Lee and Gladys Wong. He and his siblings were given the last name Levy, which was apparently an Anglicization of their father's given surname. He reported that he often had trouble cashing checks because people did not believe his last name could be Levy. While working as an actor, he also owned an electronics store in North Hollywood, California. He died on February 8, 2018.

== Selected filmography ==
- Objective, Burma! (1945) - Chinese Captain (uncredited)
- Betrayal from the East (1945) - Panama Cabbie-Spy (uncredited)
- God Is My Co-Pilot (1945) - Japanese Pilot (uncredited)
- China Sky (1945) - (uncredited)
- First Yank Into Tokyo (1945) - Japanese Soldier (uncredited)
- Prison Ship (1945) - Japanese Guard (uncredited)
- Little Mister Jim (1946) - Chinese Clerk (uncredited)
- Dangerous Millions (1946) - Guard (uncredited)
- The Beginning or the End (1947) - Japanese Sailor (uncredited)
- The Secret Life of Walter Mitty (1947) - Waiter in Chinese Restaurant (uncredited)
- Singapore (1947) - Bellboy (uncredited)
- April Showers (1948) - Elevator Operator (uncredited)
- Half Past Midnight (1948) - Chinese Warehouse Workman (uncredited)
- Night Has a Thousand Eyes (1948) - Young Chinese Man (uncredited)
- Malaya (1949) - Japanese Aide (uncredited)
- I Was an American Spy (1951) - Japanese Guard (uncredited)
- China Corsair (1951) - Kam (uncredited)
- Peking Express (1951) - Chinese Officer (uncredited)
- Fixed Bayonets! (1951) - Communist Tank Leader (uncredited)
- Japanese War Bride (1952) - Kioto
- Macao (1952) - Chang (uncredited)
- The Miraculous Blackhawk: Freedom's Champion (1952, Serial) - Chop Chop
- Target Hong Kong (1953) - Lo Chi (uncredited)
- From Here to Eternity (1953) - Bartender (uncredited)
- Mission Over Korea (1953) - Guerrilla (uncredited)
- Flight Nurse (1953) - North Korean (uncredited)
- Forbidden (1953) - Tang
- Hell and High Water (1954) - Asian Man (uncredited)
- Prisoner of War (1954) - Red Guard
- The Shanghai Story (1954) - Sampan Captain (uncredited)
- The Bamboo Prison (1954) - Meatball
- Love Is a Many-Splendored Thing (1955) - Soldier (uncredited)
- The Conqueror (1956) - Mongol (uncredited)
- The King and I (1956) - Whipping Guard (uncredited)
- Hold Back the Night (1956) - Chinese Lieutenant (uncredited)
- Around the World in 80 Days (1956) - Minor Role (uncredited)
- China Gate (1957) - Khuan
- The 27th Day (1957) - Chinese Sergeant (uncredited)
- Alfred Hitchcock Presents (1958) (Season 3 Episode 37: "The Canary Sedan") - Chang
- Alfred Hitchcock Presents (1958) (Season 4 Episode 1: "Poison") - Dr. Ganderbay's Assistant
- Jet Attack (1958) - Orderly
- Steve Canyon TV Series (1959) - Wang San (Episode: "Sabotage")
- Flower Drum Song (1961) - Policeman (uncredited)
- Satan Never Sleeps (1962) - Ho San
- The Young and the Brave (1963) - Communist Soldier
- The Wrecking Crew (1968) - Kim
- The Girl Who Knew Too Much (1969) - Wong See
- MASH (1970) - Korean Doctor (uncredited)
- Sharky's Machine (1981) - Chin No. 2 (final film role)
