= Albert Heschong =

United States production designer

- Born: February 22, 1919; Cincinnati, Ohio, US
- Died: March 1, 2001 (aged 82); Encino, California, US
- Occupation: Production designer

Elmer Albert Heschong (February 22, 1919 – March 1, 2001) was an American art director and production designer, principally for television. In a career that spanned more than 40 years, he worked on over 2,500 productions and was posthumously inducted into the Art Directors Guild Hall of Fame.

A native of Cincinnati, he served in the United States Army during World War II and worked in scenic design for the live theater after the war. He began working for the American Broadcasting Company in 1949 and worked on the network's early live drama series, Pulitzer Prize Playhouse and Celanese Theatre. He continued to work on live television drama in the 1950s, working on United States Steel Hour, Climax!, and Playhouse 90. He won an Emmy Award for his art direction on Playhouse 90's 1956 production of Requiem for a Heavyweight.

In the 1960s, he worked on multiple CBS series, including Gunsmoke (1961–1973), The Wild Wild West (1965–1967), and Hawaii Five-O (1968–1969). During the 1970s and 1980s, he worked principally on television movies, winning Emmy nominations for his work on Rascals and Robbers: The Secret Adventures of Tom Sawyer and Huckleberry Finn (1982) and My Wicked, Wicked Ways: The Legend of Errol Flynn (1985).

== Early years ==
Heschong was born in Cincinnati in 1919. His father, Albert Heschong, designed and made clothing. As a boy, he enjoyed building model boats and airplanes, drawing, and building things with Erector Sets. He attended Walnut Hills High School in Cincinnati, graduated cum laude, and was voted "most all-around boy in the class." He was also in drama club, where he both acted and designed sets.

After graduating high school, his high school drama teacher contacted the drama department at Pittsburgh's Carnegie Institute of Technology and secured a scholarship for Heschong. In the second half of his sophomore year, he transferred to the architecture department to develop his technical drawing skills. He left Carnegie Tech after two years to work at a playhouse in Chautauqua, New York. He next worked for a year at a theatrical company in Cincinnati and then for the Baltimore Museum of Art, where he designed and built sets and exhibits.

During World War II, he was drafted into the United States Army. He was assigned to a camouflage design unit at Richmond Air Force Base, where he worked with Broadway designer Jo Mielziner. He was later assigned to interpret aerial reconnaissance photographs. He spent 18 months in India, supervising photographic reconnaissance in the China Burma India Theater.

After the war, Heschong returned to Carnegie Tech to finish his degree. He was then hired to assist in teaching scenic design at Carnegie Tech. He also did design work for stage productions, including scenic design for The Woodstock Playhouse.

== Television career ==
=== ABC ===
In 1949, he was hired by the American Broadcasting Company (ABC) as an art director. His early works included futuristic settings for ABC's Buck Rogers television show, including the interior of Buck Rogers' spaceship and the use of sparkler for the blastoff of rockets.

In 1950, he was assigned to create all the settings for ABC's live drama Pulitzer Prize Playhouse. For the first episode, You Can't Take It with You, he built a large Victorian house set for $15,000.

While at ABC, he also worked with Alex Segal on the live drama series Celanese Theatre, including productions of Abe Lincoln in Illinois (1950) with Raymond Burr, Winterset (1951) with Burgess Meredith, Ah Wilderness (1951), Anna Christie (1952), and The Street Scene (1952). In the early 1950s, the ABC art department in New York worked out of a building that had previously been horse stables. They built sets using quarter-inch plywood on one-by-three framing.

=== United States Steel Hour ===
In 1954, he began working on the United States Steel Hour, which aired on NBC. His work at the Steel Hour included P.O.W. (1953), The Last Notch (1954), Hedda Gabler (1954), A Garden in the Sea (1954), No Time for Sergeants (1955), and Freighter (1955). No Time for Sergeants featured highly stylized sets and was the first dramatic show that was aired with an audience. For The Last Notch, the first Western done for television, he designed an entire Western street scene. For A Garden in the Sea, he designed a villa in Venice, including a gondola approaching the villa.

=== First stint at CBS ===
In the fall of 1955, he moved to Los Angeles to work for CBS. His first series for CBS was Climax! with Martin Manulis. His work for Climax! included Dr. Jekyll and Mr. Hyde (1955) and The Circular Staircase (1956). Heschong also worked on the Meet Millie sitcom, the Red Skelton Hour, and an early-summer replacement show starring Johnny Carson. On the Skelton show, he was asked to design numerous trick shots.

When Manulis left Climax! in 1956, Heschong followed him to Playhouse 90. Heschong won an Emmy Award for his art direction on the Rod Serling boxing drama Requiem for a Heavyweight (1956). For Requiem, his notable designs included sets at the boxing venue and a railroad car. Heschong's other notable Playhouse 90 productions included The Miracle Worker (1957), Helen Morgan (1957), Seven Against the Wall (1958), The Velvet Alley (1959), and Judgment at Nuremberg (1959). He designed the courtroom for Judgment at Nuremberg.

=== 20th Century Fox ===
In 1959, he was hired by 20th Century Fox to work on the series Adventures in Paradise, a South Pacific adventure series created by James Michener. He did not stay at Fox for very long.

=== Return to CBS ===
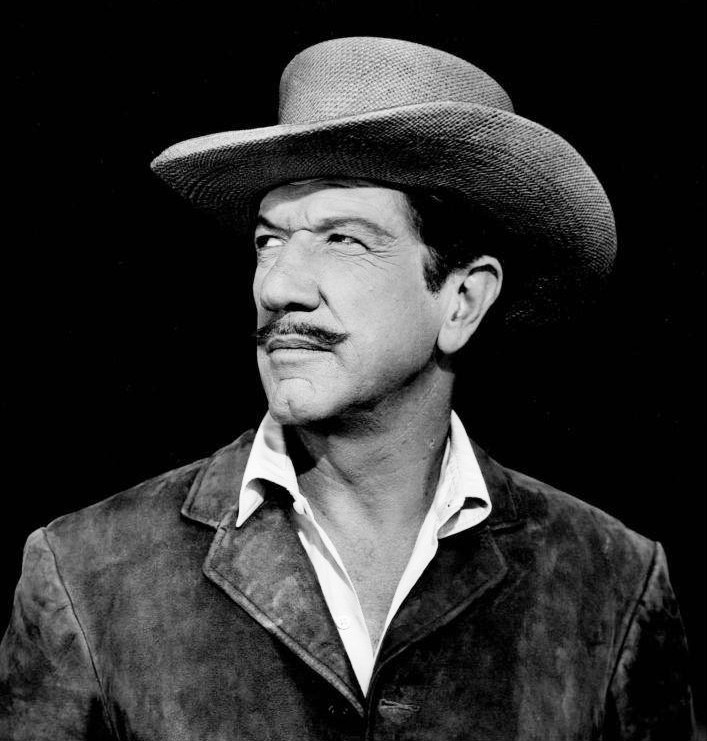
Have Gun, Will Travel

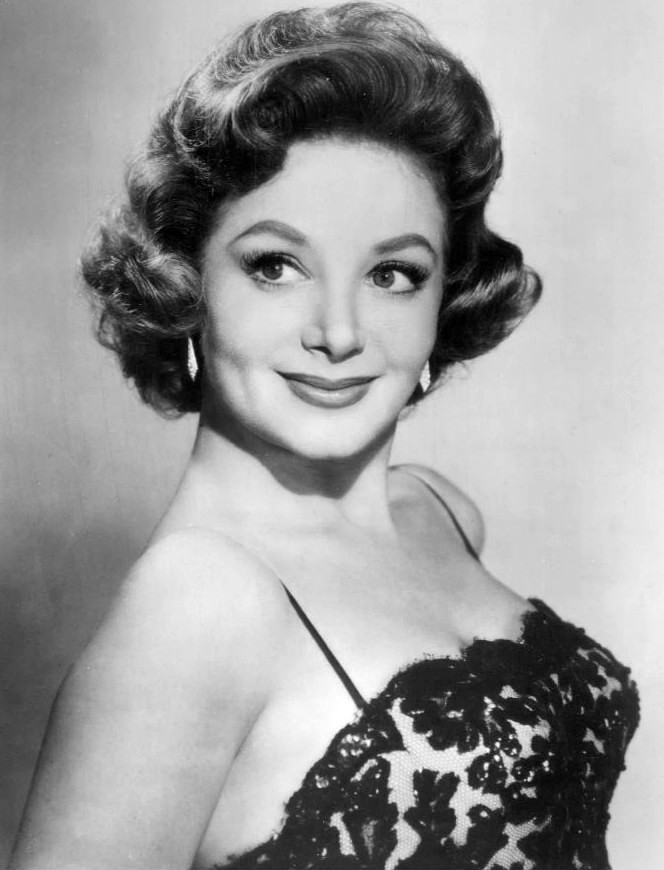
Cara Williams

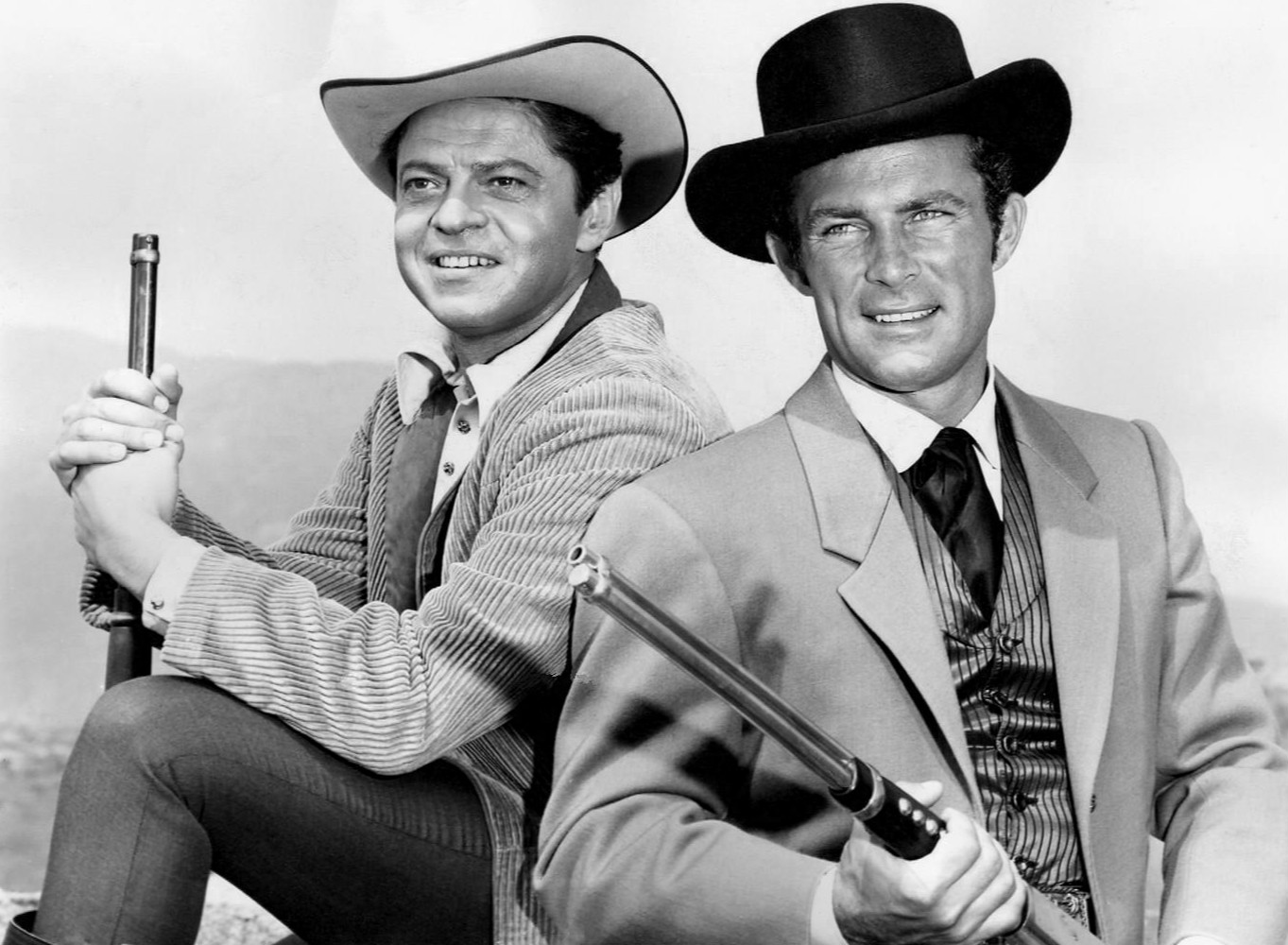
The Wild, Wild West

After leaving Fox, he returned to CBS and worked on the sitcom Pete and Gladys, the Western Have Gun – Will Travel, and later another sitcom The Cara Williams Show.

In 1961, Heschong became the production designer on the Western series Gunsmoke. When the series moved from Hollywood to Studio City, he had to restore and redesign the sets. The sets were built along one long street with multiple buildings and interiors, including the sheriff's office, a livery stable, a hotel lobby, and a doctor's office. He worked on about 140 episodes of Gunsmoke.

During the 1963–64 season, he also worked on The Great Adventure. The first episode of that series was "The Hunley", a story about a Civil War submarine. He prepared a full-size submarine (full-size exterior and interiors and miniatures) and docks for that production.

In addition to his regular art directing work, Heschong became the head of the CBS art department in 1964.

From 1965 to 1967, he also worked on another Western series, The Wild Wild West. He worked on that show from the start and designed all the sets. The writers came up with many strange concepts and effects that were a challenge, including a steam-driven wheel chair, a steam engine that spit flames, and other unusual vehicles. He did 48 episodes on Wild Wild West.

He left Gunsmoke during the 1968–69 season to work on Hawaii Five-O. He also covered a few episodes of The Bob Newhart Show in the 1970s.

=== Television movies ===
During the 1970s and 1980s, he worked on numerous television movies, including Steven Spielberg's Something Evil (1972). One of his favorites was the television movie Visions (1972), for which he designed a large rubble scene to show the aftermath from the explosion of a water treatment plant.

He received an Emmy nomination for his art direction on Rascals and Robbers: The Secret Adventures of Tom Sawyer and Huckleberry Finn (1982). Much of his work on that project involved selecting locations in Natchez, Mississippi.

He received his final Emmy nomination for My Wicked, Wicked Ways: The Legend of Errol Flynn (1985). Heschong recalled that the number of sets was enormous, and executives became very nervous about the budget. As a result, he had to cut many corners.

In all, Heschong was art director or production designer on more than 2,500 productions.

== Personal life and later years ==
Heschong married former Naomi Eva Harris in 1946. They had three children, Gregg, Eric, and Lisa. He lived in Encino, California. In 2001, he died of a cerebral hemorrhage at his home at age 82. He was posthumously inducted into the Art Directors Guild Hall of Fame in 2011.

His son, Gregg, became a camera operator and director of photography for dozens of television series.

== Selected works ==
- Pulitzer Prize Playhouse
  You Can't Take It with You (1950, art director)
- Celanese Theatre (1951–1952)
  Abe Lincoln in Illinois (1950)
  Winterset (1951)
  Ah Wilderness (1951)
  Anna Christie (1952)
  The Street Scene (1952)
- United States Steel Hour (1953–1955, production designer, 3 episodes)
  P.O.W. (1953, production designer)
  The Last Notch (1954)
  Hedda Gabler (1954)
  A Garden in the Sea (1954)
  No Time for Sergeants (1955, production designer)
  Freighter (1955)
- Climax! (1955–1956)
  Dr. Jekyll and Mr. Hyde (1955)
  The Adventures of Huckleberry Finn (1955)
  The Circular Staircase (1956)
- Judy Garland Musical Special (1956)
- Playhouse 90 (1957–1959, art director, 12 episodes)
  Requiem for a Heavyweight (1956, art director)
  The Miracle Worker (1957)
  Helen Morgan (1957, art director)
  The Hostess with the Mostes' (1957, art director)
  Seven Against the Wall (1958, art director)
  Judgment at Nuremberg (1959, art director)
- Studio One in Hollywood (1958, art director, 1 episode)
- Adventures in Paradise (1959–1960, art director)
- Have Gun – Will Travel (1961, art director)
- The Great Adventure (1963–1964, art director)
  "The Hunley"
- Gunsmoke (1961–1973, art director)
- The Wild Wild West (1965–1967, art director)
- Hawaii Five-O (1968–1969, art director)
- The Bob Newhart Show (1975–1976, art director)
- Rascals and Robbers: The Secret Adventures of Tom Sawyer and Huckleberry Finn (1982)
- My Wicked, Wicked Ways: The Legend of Errol Flynn (1985)
- Extreme Prejudice (1987, production designer)
- Eisenhower and Lutz (1988, art director)
- Annie McGuire (1988, art director)
- Flight of the Intruder (1991, art director)
