= Prisoner of War (1954 film) =

1954 film

- 1954 Theatrical Poster
- Directed by: Andrew Marton
- Written by: Allen Rivkin
- Produced by: Henry Berman
- Starring: Ronald Reagan; Steve Forrest; Dewey Martin; Oskar Homolka
- Cinematography: Robert Planck
- Edited by: James Newcom
- Music by: Jeff Alexander (Uncredited)
- Production company: Metro-Goldwyn-Mayer
- Distributed by: Loews, Inc.
- Release date: May 4, 1954
- Running time: 81 minutes
- Country: United States
- Language: English
- Budget: $569,000
- Box office: $1,077,000

Prisoner of War is a 1954 American war–drama film directed by Andrew Marton and starring Ronald Reagan, Steve Forrest, Dewey Martin and Oskar Homolka.

== Plot ==
An American officer volunteers to be captured in order to investigate claims of torture against American POWs in North Korean camps during the Korean War.

== Cast ==
- Ronald Reagan as Webb Sloane
- Steve Forrest as Cpl. Joseph Robert Stanton
- Dewey Martin as Jesse Treadman
- Oskar Homolka as Col. Nikita I. Biroshilov (as Oscar Homolka)
- Robert Horton as Francis Aloysius Belney
- Paul Stewart as Capt. Jack Hodges
- Harry Morgan as Maj. O.D. Halle (as Henry Morgan)
- Stephen Bekassy as Lt. Georgi M. Robovnik
- Leonard Strong as Col. Kim Doo Yi
- Darryl Hickman as Merton Tollivar
- Weaver Levy as Red Guard
- Rollin Moriyama as Capt. Lang Hyun Choi
- Ike Jones as Benjamin Julesberg
- Clarence Lung as MVD officer
- Jerry Paris as Axel Horstrom
- John Lupton as Lt. Peter Reilly
- Ralph Ahn as Red Guard
- Peter Hansen as Capt. Fred Osborne
- Strother Martin as Man on Crutches
- Gordon Mitchell as Bit Role
- Dick Sargent as Lt. Leonard Lee
- Stuart Whitman as Captain (uncredited)
- Jastin Ardiente as Captain

== Production notes ==
Release of the film created a minor controversy. The U.S. Army had assisted production and made edits in the script, but approval was abruptly reversed on the eve of release. The depiction of mistreatment and torture of prisoners of war complicated the courts martial of POW collaborators that were proceeding at the time.

The brainwashing and abuse of American prisoners of war during the Korean War was also dramatized in P.O.W. (1953), The Bamboo Prison (1954), and The Manchurian Candidate (1962, starring Frank Sinatra).

== Reception ==
According to MGM records the film made $785,000 in the US and Canada and $292,000 elsewhere, resulting in a profit of $111,000.

=== Historical accuracy ===
Author Robert J. Lentz of the book Korean War Filmography: 91 English Language Features through 2000 states that the film was "undeniably overstated".
