= P.O.W. (The United States Steel Hour) =

- The United States Steel Hour episode
- Richard Kiley and Gary Merrill
- Episode no.: Season 1 Episode 1
- Directed by: Alex Segal
- Written by: David Davidson
- Original air date: October 27, 1953

Guest appearances
- Richard Kiley as Sgt. Lucky Dover; Gary Merrill as Major E. E. Mead; Brian Keith as Sgt. Iron Man Bonsell

Episode chronology
← Previous —	Next → "Hope for a Harvest"

"P.O.W." was an American television play that was broadcast by the American Broadcasting Company (ABC) on October 27, 1953. It was the first episode of the series The United States Steel Hour. The production examined the physical and mental suffering of former prisoners of war returning from the Korean War. Produced and directed by Alex Segal, the production starred Richard Kiley, Gary Merrill, and Brian Keith.

== Plot ==
=== Act I ===
Produced three months after the end of the Korean War, the play is set at a military hospital where American soldiers are treated after being released from prisoner of war camp number 9. The soldiers were subjected to various physical and mental hardships, including brainwashing.

Major E.E. Mead is a neuropsychiatrist who provides treatment and support to the soldiers. Sgt. Lucky Dover arrives at the hospital having lost 25 pounds and in delicate mental condition. He is a hero among most of the former prisoners for having stood up to their Chinese captors. Other characters also have emotional scars from their time as prisoners. Freddy Benton suffers from crippling guilt for having been broken by his captors into signing a false confession.

Dover receives a 30-day leave to visit home. The mayor informs him that the legion has arranged a banquet and gifts of a new car and house. Dover is uncomfortable with the attention at home. At night, he is haunted by a voice. He cuts his leave short and returns to the hospital.

=== Act II ===
Act II features flashbacks to the P.O.W. camp. In one flashback, Comrade Chang tries to persuade the men of the virtue of communism and evils of capitalism. Dover ridiculed the brainwashing and is thrown in the hole.

In another flashback sequence, Sgt. Bonsell plans an escape. The escape was foiled, as somebody told the Chinese of the plan. Walter Fitch, who lost his legs in the escape attempt, attacks Dover, believing that Dover was the rat.

=== Act III ===
Dover is convinced that he betrayed his colleagues by disclosing the escape plan. He was thrown into the hole on a second occasion. He doesn't recall the interrogation, but he recalls being treated very favorably afterwards.

Betty Lou visits Dover in the hospital. Dover cries in her arms.

Bonsell tells Mead about beatings he received in the camp. He claims he never gave in to his captors, but he now suffers from ulcers.

Fitch steals a gun from a military police officer. He seeks revenge on Dover for the loss of his legs. He points his gun at Dover, but Bonsell intervenes. He confesses that he was the one who revealed the escape plan to the Chinese and arranged with the Chinese to make it appear as though Dover was responsible. Fitch turns his fury on Bonsell, but Dover defends Bonsell. They were all subjected to horrible conditions. Fitch is persuaded and forgives Bonsell.

== Cast ==
The following actors received screen credit for their performances:

- Richard Kiley as Sgt. Lucky Dover
- Gary Merrill as Major E. E. Mead
- Phyllis Kirk as Betty Lou
- Brian Keith as Sgt. Iron Man Bonsell
- Johnny Stewart as Corporal Freddy Benton
- Don Hanmer as Walter Fitch
- Michael Dreyfuss as Danny
- Lloyd Knight as Marty
- Mary Fickett as Lt. Harper
- Cameron Prud'homme as Dover's Father
- Anne Seymour as Dover's Mother
- Donald McHenry as Willis
- Morley Chang as Comrade Chang
- Russell Hardie as Mayor Blake

== Production ==
"P.O.W." was produced by the Theatre Guild as the first installment of a new program, United States Steel Hour. The program was broadcast from New York City on the ABC network on October 27, 1953, at 9:30 p.m.

David Davidson wrote the teleplay specially for the Steel Hour. It tells the story of prisoners of war returning to the United States after being subjected to physical and mental abuse, including "brainwashing treatment", in communist prison camps during the Korean War. Prior to writing the teleplay, Davidson interviewed repatriated prisoners and Army doctors.

The Steel Hour was led by producer/director Alex Segal, who was previously at the helm of the critically acclaimed Celanese Theatre and Pulitzer Prize Playhouse. James McNaughton, who had worked with Segal on Celanese Theatre, was the show's art director. Albert Heschong, who was later inducted into the Art Directors Guild Hall of Fame, received screen credit as the designer. The sets, which included the military hospital and prisoner of war camp, were called "outstandingly well suited", "splendid", and "reasonably authentic."

Musical director Bernard Green was credited with using the harmonica to form a musical bridge between scenes. Technical military assistance was provided by Col. Kenneth Brewer, Lt. Col. Phillip P. Smith, Lt. Col. Roy Weir Jr., and Lt. Ray M. Dowe.

After its premiere with "P.O.W.", the United States Steel Hour was broadcast for 10 seasons from 1953 to 1963. The brainwashing and abuse of American prisoners of war during the Korean War was again dramatized in Prisoner of War (1954, starring Ronald Reagan), The Bamboo Prison (1954), and The Manchurian Candidate (1962, starring Frank Sinatra).

== Reception ==
Television critic Leo Mishkin called it "TV drama of the first order, written with keen perception of character, and staged and acted with remarkable power."

In the Pittsburgh Post-Gazette, Win Fanning called it "great drama" and wrote that the production "came closer" to meeting theatre's responsibilities of truth and dramatic integrity "than anything presented heretofore on the living room screen."
