= The Bamboo Prison =

1954 film by Lewis Seiler

- Film poster
- Directed by: Lewis Seiler
- Written by: Edwin Blum; Jack DeWitt
- Produced by: Bryan Foy
- Starring: Robert Francis; Dianne Foster; Brian Keith; Jerome Courtland
- Cinematography: Burnett Guffey
- Edited by: Henry Batista
- Color process: Black and white
- Production company: Columbia Pictures
- Distributed by: Columbia Pictures
- Release date: December 1954
- Running time: 79 minutes
- Country: United States
- Language: English

The Bamboo Prison is a 1954 American Korean War–drama film directed by Lewis Seiler and starring Robert Francis, Brian Keith, Dianne Foster, and Jerome Courtland. The working title was I Was a Prisoner in Korea. The US Army denied their co-operation to the producers.

Due to Cold War hysteria, the film was falsely accused of communist sympathies, with several US cities banning it, although the film is clear that Sgt. Rand was actually a spy for the US, pretending to be a sympathizer.

The brainwashing and abuse of American POWs during the Korean War were also dramatized in P.O.W. (1953), Prisoner of War (1954, starring Ronald Reagan), and The Manchurian Candidate (1962, starring Frank Sinatra).

== Plot ==
A group of American soldiers are POWs in North Korea in the final phase of the Korean War. POWs who show sympathy with the communist cause are given special privileges, but are understandably hated by the other prisoners, who see them as traitors.

The camp "brain-washer", Comrade Clayton, is permitted to have his beautiful Russian wife, Tanya, live in camp. Sergeant Rand, one of the communist sympathizers (known as Progressives), falls in love with her, and his special privileges permit him to go to her house. However, she is not a communist sympathizer. Meanwhile. the camp priest, Father Dolan, is actually an impostor, trying to glean information through confession. Despite their differences, Rand helps his rival, Corporal Brady, to escape.

At war's end, Sgt. Rand poses as a man disillusioned with the capitalist system and its exploitation of the working man in order to remain in North Korea as an American intelligence agent.

== Cast ==
- Robert Francis as M/Sgt. John A. Rand
- Dianne Foster as Tanya Clayton
- Brian Keith as Cpl. Brady
- Jerome Courtland as Arkansas
- E.G. Marshall as Father Francis Dolan
- Jack Kelly as Slade
- Earle Hyman as Doc Jackson
- Richard Loo as Commandant Hsai Tung
- Keye Luke as Comrade-Instructor Li Ching
- Murray Matheson as Comrade Clayton
- King Donovan as Pop
- Pepe Hern as Ramírez
- Dickie Jones as Jackie
- Leo Gordon as Pike
- Weaver Levy as Meatball
- Robert "Buzz" Henry as a Progressive
- Eddie Ryder as Jones
- Aaron Spelling as Skinny
