= Lillian Kinkella Keil =

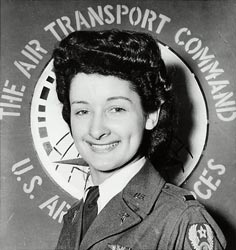
Captain Lillian Kinkella Keil

Captain Lillian Kinkella Keil (November 17, 1916 – June 30, 2005) was a highly decorated American World War II and Korean War flight nurse. Keil made 250 evacuation flights (23 of them transatlantic) during World War II and 175 evacuation flights during the Korean War, becoming one of the most decorated women in American military history.

== Biography ==
Keil was born in Arcata, California. She was raised in a convent after her father abandoned her mother and their three small children. Watching the nuns tend to the sick is what drew her into nursing.

Immediately following high school, Keil attended the nursing program at St. Mary's Hospital in San Francisco and became a registered nurse.

In 1939, she became one of the first stewardesses for United Airlines. After the United States entered World War II in 1941, a passenger suggested she become a flight nurse for the United States Army Air Forces.

She was among the first flight nurse graduates of the Army School of Air Evacuation at Bowman Field, Louisville, Kentucky. Captain Keil served in London by the summer of 1943 and at Omaha Beach after the June 1944 D-Day invasion. She was among the nurses who tended the wounded of George S. Patton's Third Army as it drove across France. Her older brother, SSGT John J. Kinkella served with the Army 184th Infantry Division in the South Pacific and was killed in action on February 4, 1944, at Kwajlein Atoll, in the Marshall Islands. She arranged to have her brother's remains repatriated after the war and he was interred at Golden Gate National Cemetery in September 1949.

After the war, she returned to being a United Airlines stewardess, but reenlisted when the Korean War broke out, this time in the United States Air Force. She was one of only 30 Air Force nurses stationed in the Far East.

In all, she flew 175 air evacuations out of Korea, to go with her 250 in World War II, for a total of 425. It is estimated that she tended over 10,000 wounded in her military career.

She served as a technical advisor for the 1953 film Flight Nurse, starring Joan Leslie and Forrest Tucker, which was partly based upon her own experiences.

In 1954, she met Walter Keil, a former Navy intelligence officer during World War II. After only six weeks, they married, and when she became pregnant in 1955, she received an honorable discharge. The couple settled in Covina, California, where she continued to work as a nurse. They had two daughters. When she was the subject of a 1961 episode of the TV show This Is Your Life, the show drew one of its ten highest mail responses.

Keil died of cancer at the age of 88 and is buried at Riverside National Cemetery in Riverside, California.

== Awards ==
Keil was awarded 19 medals and ribbons, including:

- 4 Air Medals
- 2 Presidential Unit Citations
- 1 World War II Victory Medal
- 4 battle stars in World War II
- 1 Korean Service Medal with seven battle stars

In 2005 following her death, Congress passed a bill renaming the post office in Covina the Lillian Kinkella Keil Post Office.
