= Huckleberry Finn (disambiguation) =

Huckleberry Finn is a fictional character created by Mark Twain.

Huckleberry Finn may also refer to:

- Adventures of Huckleberry Finn, a Mark Twain novel
- Huckleberry Finn (1920 film), a silent film featuring Gordon Griffith
- Huckleberry Finn (1931 film), starring Jackie Coogan and Junior Durkin
- Huckleberry Finn (1974 film), a musical starring Jeff East
- Huckleberry Finn (1975 film), a TV movie with Ron Howard
- Huckleberry Finn, an opera by Hall Overton
- Huckleberry Finn (EP), by Duke Special
- M/S Huckleberry Finn

== See also ==
- Adventures of Huckleberry Finn (disambiguation)
- Huckleberry Finn and His Friends (1979 TV series), starring Ian Tracey
- Huckleberry no Bouken, a 1994 Japanese anime
