= The House Across the Street =

1949 film by Richard L. Bare

- Theatrical release poster
- Directed by: Richard L. Bare
- Screenplay by: Russell S. Hughes
- Story by: Roy Chanslor
- Produced by: Saul Elkins
- Starring: Wayne Morris; Janis Paige; Bruce Bennett; Alan Hale, Sr. James Mitchell; Barbara Bates
- Cinematography: William E. Snyder
- Edited by: Frank Magee
- Music by: William Lava
- Production company: Warner Bros. Pictures
- Distributed by: Warner Bros. Pictures
- Release date: September 10, 1949
- Running time: 69 minutes
- Country: United States
- Language: English
- Budget: $200,000
- Box office: $501,000

The House Across the Street is a 1949 American comedy film directed by Richard L. Bare and written by Russell S. Hughes. The film stars Wayne Morris, Janis Paige, Bruce Bennett, Alan Hale, Sr., James Mitchell and Barbara Bates. The film was released by Warner Bros. Pictures on September 10, 1949. The story on which the screenplay was based, written by Roy Chanslor, was originally made as the movie Hi Nellie in 1936. The source material had also been reworked in Love Is on the Air (1937) and You Can't Escape Forever (1942).

== Plot ==
Newspaper managing editor Dave Joslin is demoted to the advice column of his newspaper due to his editorials criticizing the police for failing to safeguard a witness and investigate his murder. With the help of his girlfriend Kit Williams, the previous advice columnist, Joslin manages to secure the cooperation of Marty Bremer and the conviction of crime boss Matthew Keever. At the end, Joslin, reinstated as editor, offers Kit her old job back, but she accepts his marriage proposal instead.

== Cast ==
- Wayne Morris as Dave Joslin
- Janis Paige as Kit Williams
- Bruce Bennett as Matthew J. Keever
- Alan Hale, Sr. as J.B. Grennell
- James Mitchell as Marty Bremer
- Barbara Bates as Beth Roberts
- James Holden as Carl Schrader

== Reception ==
According to Warner Bros., the film earned $391,000 in the U.S. and $110,000 in other markets.
