= Judy Garland Musical Special (General Electric Theater) =

- General Electric Theater episode
- Judy Garland Musical Special (1956)
- Episode no.: Season 4 Episode 28
- Directed by: Alex Segal
- Original air date: April 8, 1956
- Running time: 30 minutes

Episode chronology
← Previous "The Easter Gift"	Next → "That's the Man"

"Judy Garland Musical Special" was an American television special that was broadcast by CBS on April 8, 1956, as part of the television series General Electric Theater. Created by Richard Avedon, the special featured Judy Garland performing seven songs, most against simple, dark sets.

== The program ==
After introductory comments from Ronald Reagan, the production began with Garland in the spotlight on a dark stage singing "I Feel a Song Coming On."

She then notes: "I have a feeling that there's much too much talk going on in the world today so you're going to get very little from me but I'm a singer and I just like to sing". Still in the spotlight on a darkened stage, she sings "I Will Come Back", a song that her parents sang in vaudeville.

Garland introduces Joe Bushkin who plays an instrumental piece on piano. Bushkin then plays as Garland sings "Last Night When We Were Young." They follow with "Life Is Just a Bowl of Cherries."

Garland moves to a set featuring a makeup table and mirror and a framed photograph of her boy Joe. She dons a robe and sings "Dirty Hands, Dirty Face."

After a commercial break, Peter Gennaro dances to a jazz song. Garland enters and sings "Come Rain or Come Shine" as she dances with Gennaro and flirts with Bushkin and drummer Jack Costanzo.

On a metal circular staircase, Garland sings "April Showers." She departs up the staircase as the credits roll.

In closing comments, Reagan says, "There's only one Judy Garland."

== Cast ==
The program featured:

- Judy Garland
- Joe Bushkin - piano
- Jack Costanzo - jazz trio (drummer)
- Red Callender - jazz trio
- Dick Cathcart - jazz trio (trumpet)

The broadcast was introduced by Ronald Reagan.

== Production ==
The special was Garland's second for television. It was broadcast by CBS as part of the General Electric Theater program on April 8, 1956.

The producer was Garland's husband Sid Luft. Ralph Nelson directed, and photographer Richard Avedon was the show's creator. Dance sequences were choreographed and danced by Peter Gennaro. Nelson Riddle provided the music. Garland's gowns were provided by Galanos. Albert Heschong was the art director.

== Reception ==
The program received mixed reviews.

In The New York Times, J.P. Shanley called it "a high-voltage production" in which Garland sang "with captivating style." He singled out the "Come Rain or Come Shine" number with Gennaro's dancing and Costanzo's bongo drums as "imaginative and effective."

Critic John Crosby of the New York Herald Tribune praised it as "a thorough-going triumph." He described it as "a very simple show" where the focus was on Garland's singing which she delivered "with that overwhelming authority she has."

In The Philadelphia Inquirer, Harry Harris criticized Richard Avedon, who "created" the show, for getting "so carried away by his first chance to use offbeat lighting effects on TV that he lost sight of the fact that Miss Garland was more than just another prop." He praised the simple, sentimental approach to the "Dirty Hands, Dirty Face" number, but otherwise opined, "Everything was over-produced -- frantic, jittery, unpleasant."
