= Myron McCormick =

American actor

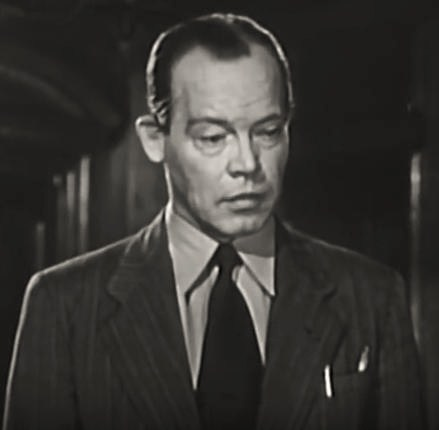
- Myron McCormick in 1949's Jigsaw
- Born: Walter Myron McCormick; February 8, 1908; Albany, Indiana, U.S.
- Died: July 30, 1962 (aged 54); New York City, U.S.
- Occupation: Actor
- Years active: 1936–1962

Myron McCormick (February 8, 1908 – July 30, 1962) was an American actor of stage, radio, and film.

== Early life and education ==
Born Walter Myron McCormick in Albany, Indiana in 1908, he was the middle child of Walter P. and Bessie M. McCormick's three children. His father, according to the federal census of 1920, was a native of Illinois and a manufacturer of tinware. He attended New Mexico Military Institute and Princeton University. At the latter, he was a member of Phi Beta Kappa Society, gained experience in musical theater, and graduated magna cum laude.

== Stage ==
McCormick was one of three cast members of the Broadway smash South Pacific to remain with the show during its nearly five-year run of 1,925 performances. McCormick's performance of sailor Luther Billis won him a Tony Award in 1950 for best supporting or featured actor in a musical. He also won the Donaldson Award for best supporting performance (actor) of 1948–1949.

McCormick was prominent as the put-upon Sergeant King in No Time for Sergeants, a military comedy that ran on Broadway from 1955 to 1957. He repeated his role for the 1958 film version starring Andy Griffith.

McCormick's other Broadway credits include 27 Wagons Full of Cotton (1954), Joy to the World (1947), Soldier's Wife (1944), Storm Operation (1943), The Damask Cheek (1942), Lily of the Valley (1941), Thunder Rock (1939), In Clover (1937), The Wingless Victory (1936), Hell Freezes Over (1935), How Beautiful with Shoes (1935), Substitute for Murder (1935), Paths of Glory (1935), and Carry Nation (1932).

== Film ==
His screen debut came in the 1936 film Winterset. He made only occasional films through the 1940s, his most prominent credit being the huge hit Jolson Sings Again (1949), featuring Myron McCormick as the man who revives Al Jolson's show business career. McCormick also appeared in Jigsaw (1949) and The Man Who Understood Women (1959). He portrayed Charlie, the partner of pool shark "Fast Eddie" Felson (Paul Newman) in The Hustler (1961).

== Radio and television ==
McCormick portrayed the title character in the ABC Radio mystery drama A Crime Letter from Dan Dodge. He became a featured performer in the soap opera Buck Private and His Girl and in many popular radio dramas of the 1940s.

McCormick also made guest appearances on numerous television programs of the 1950s/early 1960s, including The Untouchables, Naked City, Alfred Hitchcock Presents, The Donna Reed Show, Way Out and The Iceman Cometh (1960 TV production). In 1959, he played Joe Saul in Steinbeck's Burning Bright on The Play of the Week television series.

== Personal life ==
McCormick was married to actress Martha Hodge and to Barbara MacKenzie.

== Death ==
McCormick died at New York-Presbyterian Hospital in New York City on July 30, 1962, from cancer, aged 54. He was survived by his wife, a son, and a daughter.

== Filmography ==
Year	Title	Role	Notes
1936	Winterset	Carr	
1939	...One Third of a Nation...	Sam Moon	
1940	The Fight for Life	The Interne	
1942	China Girl	Shorty McGuire	
1942	USS VD: Ship of Shame	Executive Officer McGregor	uncredited
1949	Jigsaw	Charles Riggs	
1949	Jolson Sings Again	Ralph Bryant	
1955	Three for the Show	Mike Hudson	
1955	Not as a Stranger	Dr. Snider	
1958	No Time for Sergeants	Sergeant Orville C. King	
1959	The Man Who Understood Women	Preacher	
1960	Alfred Hitchcock Presents	Bert Haber	season 5, episode 31: "I Can Take Care of Myself"
1961	Alfred Hitchcock Presents	Newton B. Clovis	season 6, episode 25: "Museum Piece"
1961	The Hustler	Charlie Burns	
1962	A Public Affair	Sam Clavell	
