= James Holden (actor) =

American film, stage and television actor

- Holden in No Time for Sergeants, 1957
- Born: Harold N. Ratliff; December 12, 1920; Birmingham, Alabama, U.S.
- Died: January 19, 2005 (aged 84); Burbank, California, U.S.
- Occupations: Film, stage and television actor
- Spouse: Jeanna McMahan

Harold N. Ratliff (December 12, 1920 – January 19, 2005) was an American film, stage and television actor. He was best known for playing Clay Baker in the American adventure television series Adventures in Paradise.

== Life and career ==
Holden was born in Birmingham, Alabama. He began his stage career in 1947, appearing in the stage play O'Daniel. He appeared in such other plays as The Member of the Wedding, The Remarkable Mr. Pennypacker, Command Decision and No Time for Sergeants, playing Will Stockdale. According to The Minneapolis Star, he was known for his "Southern accent" in stage plays. He then began his screen career in 1948, appearing in the film Fighter Squadron, playing Lieutenant Tennessee Akins.

Later in his career, from 1960 to 1962, Holden starred as Clay Baker in the ABC adventure television series Adventures in Paradise, starring along with Gardner McKay and Guy Stockwell. He guest-starred in television programs including Star Tonight, The Campbell Playhouse and The Real McCoys. He also appeared in films such as The House Across the Street, It's a Great Feeling, Task Force, Flight Nurse and Sands of Iwo Jima.

== Death ==
Holden died on January 19, 2005, in Burbank, California, at the age of 84.
