= Icy Sparks =

Novel by Gwyn Hyman Rubio

- Author: Gwyn Hyman Rubio
- Language: English
- Genre: Novels
- Publisher: Viking Press, Penguin Books
- Publication date: 1998
- Publication place: United States
- Media type: Print (hardback & paperback)
- Pages: 320 pp (first edition, hardback)
- ISBN: 0-670-87311-X (first edition, hardback)
- OCLC: 38353446
- Dewey Decimal: 813/.54 21
- LC Class: PS3568.U295 I25 1998

Icy Sparks is the first novel by the American writer Gwyn Hyman Rubio. The novel was chosen as an Oprah's Book Club selection in March 2001.

== Plot ==
The story focuses on a grown-up Icy Sparks recounting her childhood and adolescence struggling with accusations of Tourette's Syndrome.

The novel begins with Icy Sparks, a 10-year-old girl living in a mountainous region of Eastern Kentucky with her grandparents throughout the 1950s and 1960s. Icy is alienated by her peers and often shunned and pitied by the adults in her town. One day Icy suddenly begins to experience tics, croaks, and physical spasms. Soon after these seemingly uncontrollable "secrets" begin, Icy goes down into her grandparents' root cellar to let out her tics, in an effort to hide the condition from her grandparents. Finally, Icy tells one of her few friends, Miss Emily Tanner, a local store owner who is also an outcast from society at 300 pounds. Icy's elementary school teacher tries putting her in a solitary classroom, but even that doesn't work. Her grandparents have Icy admitted to a mental institution for observation.

Even in the institution, Icy is an outcast. Though she sees herself as less mentally ill in comparison to some of her peers there, she is nonetheless tormented by one of the hospital workers. Icy is able to befriend a second worker, though she really just wants to go home to her grandparents. When she is finally allowed to leave, she stays in her house or on the surrounding property and does not venture out in public very often.

After Icy returns home, the atmosphere is tense. After her grandfather dies, Icy and her grandmother turn to religion for solace. Inspired by a tent-meeting revival where she observes that people touched by the Holy Spirit behave as if they have Tourette's Syndrome, Icy discovers she has a gift for music. Icy proceeds to attend university, where her disorder is officially diagnosed. Later, Icy becomes a therapist, working with children with Tourette's Syndrome and with kids that experience selective mutism.

== Awards and nominations ==
Icy Sparks was chosen as an Oprah's Book Club Selection in March 2001.

Writing for The New York Times, Tara Bayton asserts that, "Rubio is a writer of uncommonly warm and tender vision, often comic, brimming with love and hope" and that Icy Sparks "at the conclusion the plot loses much-needed momentum and Icy loses much of her dramatic interest as her religious fervor increases, Rubio tells an entertaining and absorbing story".
