= The Adventures of Huckleberry Finn (Climax!) =

- Climax! episode
- Episode no.: Season 2 Episode 1
- Directed by: Buzz Kulik
- Based on: Adventures of Huckleberry Finn by Mark Twain
- Original air date: 1 September 1955
- Running time: 60 minutes

"The Adventures of Huckleberry Finn" is a 1955 CBS TV film adaptation of Mark Twain's 1884 novel of the same name, starring Charles Taylor in the title role. It was directed by Herbert B. Swope Jr. It aired on September 1, 1955 as the Season 2 premiere of the anthology program Climax!.

== Plot summary ==
After discovering a chest of gold in a cave, Huckleberry Finn and Tom Sawyer are confronted by Injun Joe, who falls to his death during the encounter. The boys' newfound wealth leads to Huck's adoption by the Widow Douglas, who, along with Tom's Aunt Polly, attempts to civilize him. Huck's abusive father, "Pap," returns to claim the fortune. When he is unable to gain legal access to the money, he kidnaps Huck and holds him captive in a remote cabin.

With Tom's assistance, Huck escapes on a raft down the Mississippi River. He soon encounters two con men, the "Duke" and the "Dauphin," and discovers their plan to swindle the wealthy Wilkes family by impersonating the heirs to an inheritance. Huck's attempt to race ahead and warn the family is interrupted when his father reappears and briefly imprisons him.

Tom frees Huck, and they travel to the Wilkes estate, but the con men have already deceived the family's niece, Mary Jane. Huck and Tom's efforts to expose the fraud are successful when Judge Thatcher arrives and arrests the impostors. After returning the stolen inheritance to Mary Jane, Huck learns from Tom that his father has been found dead. Rejecting a return to his "sivilized" life, Huck departs on his raft, heading for the western territories.

== Cast ==
The following actors received screen credit for their performances:

- Thomas Mitchell as Old Man Finn
- Elizabeth Patterson as Aunt Polly
- John Carradine as The Duke
- Walter Catlett as The Dauphin
- Charles Taylor as Huck Finn
- Minor Watson as Judge Thatcher
- Bobby Hyatt as Tom Sawyer
- Denise Alexander as Mary Jane Wilks
- Katharine Warren as Widow Douglas
- Saul Gorss as Injun Joe

William Lundigan hosted the broadcast.

== Production ==
Martin Manulis was the producer and Herbert Swope Jr. the director. The teleplay was adapted for Climax! by DeWitt Bodeen based on the novel by Mark Twain. Robert Tyler Lee and Albert Heschong provided the art direction.

== See also ==
- List of films featuring slavery
