= Flight Nurse (film) =

1953 film by Allan Dwan

- film poster
- Directed by: Allan Dwan
- Written by: Alan Le May
- Starring: Joan Leslie; Forrest Tucker
- Cinematography: Reggie Lanning
- Edited by: Fred Allen
- Music by: Victor Young
- Production company: Republic Pictures
- Distributed by: Republic Pictures
- Release dates: November 4, 1953 (Washington, D.C.); November 15, 1953 (United States)
- Running time: 90 minutes
- Country: United States
- Language: English

Flight Nurse (aka Angels Take Over and Angels over Korea) is a 1953 American drama war film directed by Allan Dwan and stars Joan Leslie and Forrest Tucker. The film is largely based on the life of Lillian Kinkella Keil, one of the most decorated women in American military history.

== Plot ==
During the Korean War, United States Air Force nurse Lieutenant Polly Davis flies to Japan for her first assignment with the Medical Air Evacuation Unit. Hoping to be near her fiancé, helicopter pilot Captain Mike Barnes, she meets her roommates, Lieutenants Ann Phillips and Kit Ramsa, at the nurses' quarters in Tachikawa, but does not see Mike.

The other nurses tell Polly that "flight nurses never get their men." Chief nurse Captain Martha Ackerman, sends them on their various assignments. Polly is taken to a C-47 transport aircraft to meet medical technician Sergeant Frank Swan and pilots Captains Bill Eaton and Tommy Metcalf.

Her first experiences of war in Korea are jarring, but Polly quickly regains her composure. Bill watches as Polly calmly saves a young man's life. He begins to fall in love with her. Back in Japan, Mike takes Polly on a date and talks about marriage, but is called away for a mission. Later, Bill learns that Mike's helicopter, transporting wounded men, is overdue and attempts a rescue. During the flight, Polly learns of Mike's danger and is angry that Bill did not tell her.

During their missions, Bill is there to comfort Polly during bombings and saves her life when she is almost killed rescuing a wounded soldier. When the United States Marines and the Army land at Inchon and retake Seoul, 50,000 prisoners of war are freed. Several liberated Americans reveal that a captured Korean was in charge of killing Americans. Dog tags of dead soldiers are retrieved, including Mike's. When Polly learns of this, grieving and oblivious, she is nearly killed by "Bed Check Charlie," an enemy flier who drops nightly bombs, but Bill again saves her life.

Frank worries that Polly is near a breakdown and Bill talks to Ackerman, who grounds Polly. Later, after Kit reports Mike has been found alive near the Chosin Reservoir but in a hospital, Ackerman sends Polly there in Bill's aircraft. On the flight, a crazed soldier opens the door, which hits the stabilizer, causing a crash. Polly, trying to help an unconscious soldier, suffers a concussion.

After the crew loads the passengers into lifeboats, Bill takes Polly into the crew raft with him. As they wait for rescue, a delirious Polly calls out for Mike. When they are rescued, Polly recuperates in the same hospital as Mike, who has been receiving regular care packages from his former hometown girlfriend. When he is well enough to be shipped home, Mike again asks Polly to marry him. However, during her convalescence Polly has come to realize that she could not embrace a quiet life while she is needed in Korea, and suggests that Mike return to his real love. Later, Polly rejoins Bill and the rescue team, ready to start a new life with him.

== Cast ==
- Joan Leslie as Lt. Polly Davis
- Forrest Tucker as Capt. Bill Eaton
- Arthur Franz as Capt. Mike Barnes
- Jeff Donnell as Lt. Ann Phillips
- Ben Cooper as Pfc. Marvin Judd
- James Holden as Sgt. Frank Swan
- Kristine Miller as Lt. Kit Ramsey
- Maria Palmer as Captain Martha Ackerman
- Dick Simmons as Lt. Tommy Metcalfe (as Richard Simmons)
- James Brown as Flight engineer
- Hal Baylor as Sgt. Jimmy Case

== Production ==
The film's opening credits indicate that the Department of Defense and the United States Air Force contributed greatly to the production. The aircraft seen in Flight Nurse included the Douglas C-54 Skymaster, Douglas C-47 Skytrain and Sikorsky H-5 helicopter.

Captain Lillian Kinkella Keil served as a technical advisor for Flight Nurse, which was based upon her experiences.

== Reception ==
Fllight Nurse was critically reviewed at The New York Times. The review noted: "The resolute humanity of military flight nurses and the courage of the Air Force personnel, whose job it is to transport the war wounded and injured in defenseless helicopters and planes to medical stations, are deserving of a better tribute than they receive in Republic's 'Flight Nurse,' which opened at the Palace yesterday."

Other reviews were more positive. One film critic described it as a thrilling film that "honors the courageous women who performed miracles of mercy above the clouds in evacuation of wounded GIs from Korean battlefields."
