= Mac Hyman =

American novelist (1923–1963)

- Born: August 25, 1923; Cordele, Georgia, US
- Died: July 17, 1963 (aged 39); Cordele, Georgia, US
- Occupation: Novelist

Mac Hyman (born Mackenzie Hooks Hyman; August 25, 1923 – July 17, 1963), was an American fiction writer who is known for his best-selling novel No Time for Sergeants, which was adapted into a popular Broadway play and a motion picture.

== Early life and service ==
Hyman was born in Cordele, Georgia, where he discovered his passion for writing as a student in high school, and first displayed his skill in a humorous article published in the school newspaper. Following a year at North Georgia College and State University, he attended Duke University starting in 1941. He interrupted his studies to serve in the United States Army Air Forces during World War II as a photo navigator Lieutenant on B-29's and flew 29 combat missions over Japan.

When he returned to Duke in 1946 under the G.I. Bill, his talent was recognized by his creative writing professor, William Blackburn, who became his mentor and lifelong friend, and who eventually edited his collected letters. Just before graduating from Duke in February 1947, Hyman married his high school sweetheart, Gwendolyn Holt. In 1949, after the first of his three children was born, he reenlisted in the air force and served until 1952.

== Writing debut ==
Between 1947 and 1954, drawing heavily on his personal experiences from the army, Hyman worked on No Time for Sergeants, the misadventures of a country bumpkin draftee named Will Stockdale, whose hometown of Callville closely resembles Cordele, and who narrates his own story in an uneducated southern dialect. Several publishers rejected the manuscript before it was finally accepted by Random House and published in 1954. The popularity of the book resulted in a Broadway show and a film, which launched the career of Andy Griffith.

== After No Time for Sergeants ==
Hyman, who was living in Cordele with his wife and three children, had published just three short stories and was struggling with his second novel when he died of a heart attack in 1963, at age 39. That second novel, Take Now Thy Son, and a collection of Hyman's letters entitled Love, Boy: The Letters of Mac Hyman were both published posthumously.

== Other works and facts ==
His short story "The Hundredth Centennial" was published by The Paris Review in 1954. Another short story, "The Dove Shoot", was published in a collection of works by Duke authors in 1963.

Hyman's daughter Gwyn Hyman Rubio is the author of Icy Sparks and The Woodsman's Daughter.
