= No Time for Sergeants (film) =

1958 film by Mervyn LeRoy

- 1958 film poster
- Directed by: Mervyn LeRoy
- Written by: John Lee Mahin
- Based on: No Time for Sergeants 1954 novel by Mac Hyman; No Time for Sergeants 1955 play by Ira Levin
- Produced by: Mervyn LeRoy; Alex Segal
- Starring: Andy Griffith; Myron McCormick; Nick Adams; Murray Hamilton
- Narrated by: Andy Griffith
- Cinematography: Harold Rosson
- Edited by: William H. Ziegler
- Music by: Ray Heindorf
- Distributed by: Warner Bros. Pictures
- Release date: May 29, 1958
- Running time: 119 minutes
- Country: United States
- Language: English
- Box office: $7.5 million (US and Canada rentals)

No Time for Sergeants is a 1958 American comedy film based on a play by Ira Levin, which was inspired by the original novel. Directed by Mervyn LeRoy, it stars Andy Griffith and features Myron McCormick, Don Knotts and most of the original Broadway cast, joined by Murray Hamilton and Warner Bros. Pictures contract player Nick Adams.

== Plot ==
Will Stockdale is a backwoods rube from Georgia with super strength and a weak mind who is drafted into the United States Air Force. Other draftees being transported to basic training include dim Ben Whitledge and obnoxious bully Irving S. Blanchard. Whitledge wants to be assigned to the infantry where his six brothers served.

At boot camp, Stockdale, merely by being himself, makes life miserable for the man in charge, Master Sergeant Orville C. King, a career hack who likes his barracks to be routine and calm. In exasperation, the sergeant places Stockdale on full-time latrine duty. Stockdale believes his new position of "P.L.O." (Permanent Latrine Orderly) is a promotion. His immaculately clean latrine impresses King's company commander. King gets into hot water, however, when Stockdale reveals that the sergeant kept him on permanent bathroom duty while neglecting to have him complete the required military exams. The company commander orders King to help Stockdale through his training in one week, or he will be demoted and made "P. L. O." himself.

Rushing him through testing, King bribes Stockdale by promising to give him his wristwatch if he passes. Stockdale does and receives the wristwatch as a reward.

Blanchard convinces King to get Stockdale drunk so that he will fail the next day's inspection. Stockdale, with a tolerance to strong homemade moonshine, stays sober while King and Blanchard become drunk. They begin a barroom brawl with equally drunk infantrymen, but Stockdale returns to the base, avoiding the M.P.s. Blanchard is beaten and arrested by the M.P.s. Meanwhile, King goes missing when the colonel and captain inspect the latrine and barracks the next day. Stockdale has mechanically rigged the toilet seats to open in a “salute.” King is found after he sneaks into the latrine and triggers the toilet lids. He is reduced to the rank of private and sent to gunnery school with Stockdale and Whitledge. As King goes back to his office dejected, he admits to Stockdale that he has grown to like him. Stockdale gives the watch back to him.

At gunnery school, Stockdale is at the bottom of the class and Whitledge is next to the bottom. King graduates as the top man and is assigned to the staff of General Eugene Bush at his former rank. On their first flight, Stockdale and Whitledge fly to Denver in an obsolete B-25 bomber. Stockdale's assignment is tail gunner. After putting the plane on autopilot, the pilots fall asleep, and the airplane becomes lost at night over the atomic bomb test site at Yucca Flats, Nevada.

Following detonation of an atom bomb, a fire breaks out in the plane. Stockdale and Whitledge bail out and travel for days to get back to the base. They are declared dead by King, but the others on the plane survive and are to be decorated. During the air medal ceremony, Stockdale and Whitledge reappear, so the Air Force has to cover up the story to avoid an international public humiliation. Stockdale suggests that he and Whitledge be transferred to the infantry. General Bush has King transferred with them with a promotion to first sergeant.

== Cast ==
- Andy Griffith as Pvt. Will Stockdale
- Myron McCormick as M/Sgt. Orville C. King
- Nick Adams as Pvt. Benjamin B. Whitledge
- Murray Hamilton as Irving S. Blanchard
- Howard Smith as Maj. Gen. Eugene Bush, U.S. Air Force
- Will Hutchins as Lt. George Bridges (B-25 pilot)
- Sydney Smith as Maj. Gen. Vernon Pollard, U.S. Army
- James Millhollin as Maj. Royal B. Demming (psychiatrist)
- Don Knotts as Cpl. John C. Brown (dexterity tester)
- Jean Willes as WAF Captain
- Bartlett Robinson as Captain
- Henry McCann as Lt. Cover
- Dub Taylor as McKinney (draft board man)
- William Fawcett as Pa Stockdale
- Raymond Bailey as Base Colonel
- Jamie Farr as Lt. Gardella B-25 (co-pilot)

== Comic book adaptation ==
- Dell Four Color #914 (July 1958)

== See also ==
- List of American films of 1958
