= Harry Clark (actor) =

American actor

- Harry Clark in The Phil Silvers Show 1955
- Born: April 17, 1913; Providence, Rhode Island
- Died: February 28, 1956 (aged 42)
- Occupation: Actor

Harry Clark (April 17, 1913 – February 28, 1956) was an American actor.

Prior to his acting career, Clark was a physical education teacher, athlete, and factory worker who became involved with the International Ladies Garment Workers Union-sponsored revue Pins and Needles in 1937, and its success encouraged him to pursue a career in acting. His Broadway credits include The Skin of Our Teeth, One Touch of Venus, Call Me Mister, Kiss Me, Kate, Wish You Were Here, and Will Success Spoil Rock Hunter?

From the early 1940s through the mid-1950s, Clark appeared in a string of B-movies. On television, he appeared on The United States Steel Hour's production of No Time for Sergeants and The Phil Silvers Show, playing perhaps his best known role, as Mess Sgt. Stanley Sowici.

He died unexpectedly, while playing handball at the Young Men's Christian Association on West 63rd Street, near his home in Manhattan.
