= Adventures in Paradise (TV series) =

1959 American television series

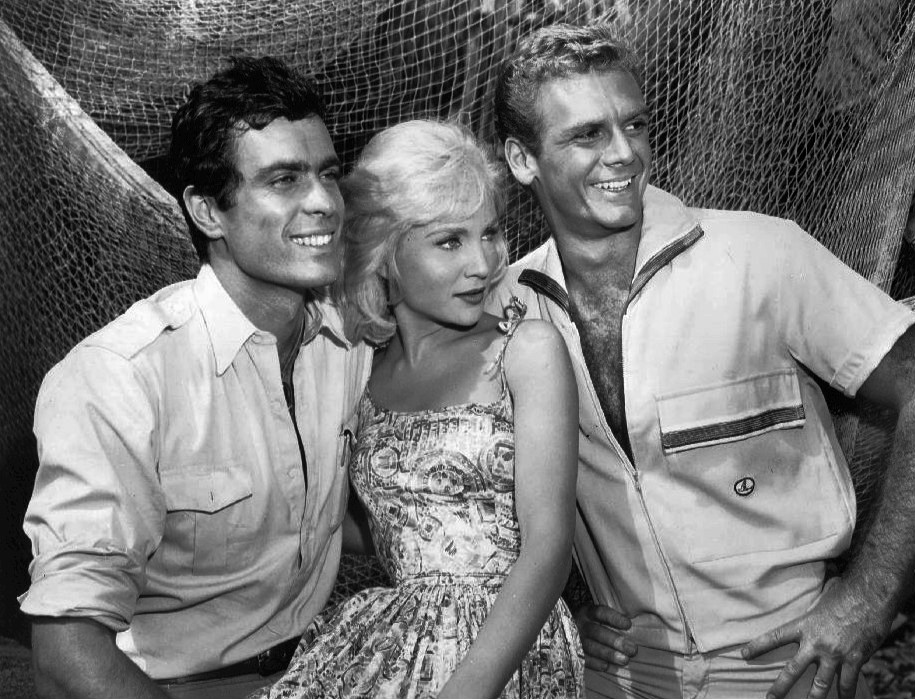
- Gardner McKay, guest star Susan Oliver, and Guy Stockwell (1961)
- Also known as: James A. Michener's Adventures in Paradise
- Genre: Adventure fiction
- Created by: James Michener
- Starring: Gardner McKay; Weaver Levy; George Tobias; James Holden; Guy Stockwell; Lani Kai
- Theme music composer: Lionel Newman
- Composer: Max Steiner
- Country of origin: United States
- Original language: English
- No. of seasons: 3
- No. of episodes: 91

Production
- Executive producers: Martin Manulis; William Self
- Producers: Richard Goldstone; William Froug; Gene Levitt; Art Wallace
- Cinematography: Lloyd Ahern
- Running time: 60 minutes
- Production companies: 20th Century-Fox Television; Martin Manulis Productions, Inc.; Marjay Productions, Inc.

Original release
- Network: ABC
- Release: October 5, 1959 – April 1, 1962

Adventures in Paradise is an American one-hour television series created by James Michener and starring Gardner McKay, which ran on ABC from 1959 until 1962.

== Premise ==
Gardner McKay starred as Adam Troy, the captain of the schooner Tiki III, which sailed the South Pacific looking for passengers and adventure. The plots deal with the romantic and detective adventures of Korean War veteran Troy. The supporting cast, varying from season to season, featured George Tobias, Guy Stockwell, and Linda Lawson. Jacques Tourneur directed the 1962 episode "A Bride for the Captain".

== Cast ==
=== Main ===
- Gardner McKay as Captain Adam Troy
- James Holden as Clay Baker (seasons 2–3)
- Guy Stockwell as Chris Parker (season 3)

=== Recurring ===
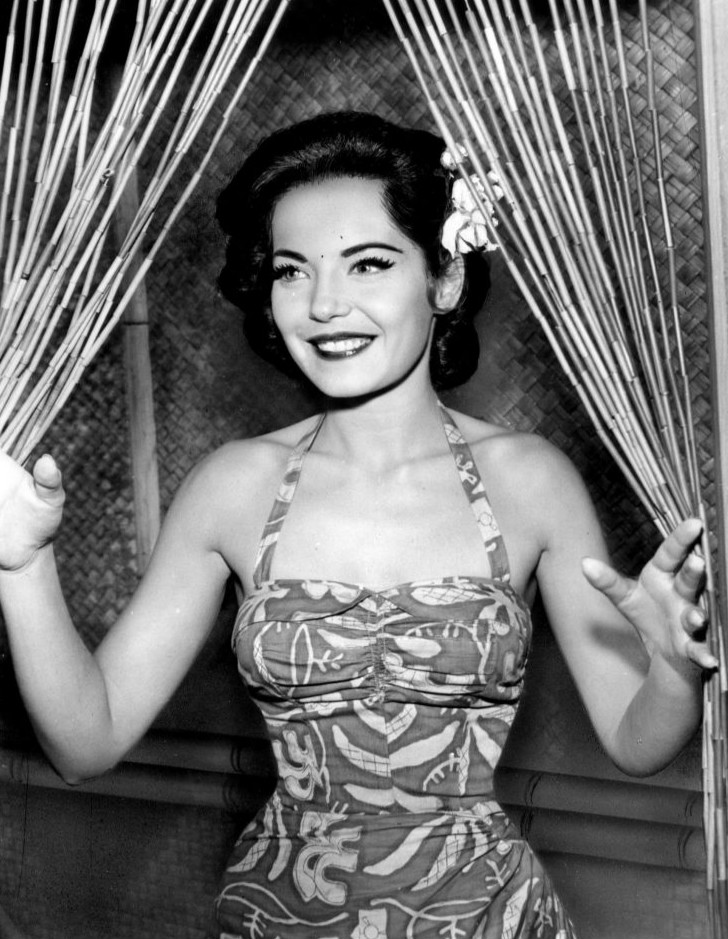
Linda Lawson as Renee

- Weaver Levy as Oliver Lee (season 1)
- Henry Slate as Bulldog Lovey (season 1)
- Linda Lawson as Renee (seasons 1–2)
- George Tobias as Trader Penrose (season 2)
- Lani Kai as Kelly (seasons 2–3)
- Marcel Hillaire as Inspector Bouchard (seasons 2–3)
- Sondi Sodsai as Sondi (seasons 1–2)

=== Guest stars ===
- Philip Ahn
- John Anderson
- Phyllis Avery
- Barbara Bain
- Diane Baker
- Joanna Barnes
- Henry Brandon
- Hans Conried
- Hazel Court
- Yvonne De Carlo
- Gloria DeHaven
- Meyer Dolinsky
- Fifi D'Orsay
- Chana Eden
- Barbara Eden
- Elana Eden
- Anne Francis
- Betty Garde
- Peggy Ann Garner
- Bruce Gordon
- Alan Hale Jr.
- Juano Hernández
- Steven Hill
- James Hong
- Rodolfo Hoyos Jr.
- Kim Hunter
- David Janssen
- Tor Johnson
- Richie Kamuca
- Anna Kashfi
- Werner Klemperer
- Martin Landau
- Bethel Leslie
- Gene Levitt
- Joanne Linville
- Dayton Lummis
- Diana Lynn
- Patrick Macnee
- George Macready
- Arthur Malet
- Murray Matheson
- Marilyn Maxwell
- Nobu McCarthy
- Sean McClory
- Joanna Moore
- Read Morgan
- Simon Oakland
- Joan O'Brien
- Dan O'Herlihy
- Susan Oliver
- J. Pat O'Malley
- David Opatoshu
- Larry Pennell
- Suzanne Pleshette
- Judson Pratt
- Vincent Price
- Juliet Prowse
- Hari Rhodes
- Brian Roper
- Jacqueline Scott
- Lizabeth Scott
- Pippa Scott
- Pilar Seurat
- Robert F. Simon
- Alexis Smith
- Fay Spain
- Barbara Steele
- Anna Sten
- Inger Stevens
- Elaine Stritch
- Barbara Stuart
- Joan Tompkins
- Betsy von Furstenberg
- Ray Walston
- Tuesday Weld
- Jesse White
- Peter Whitney
- Anna May Wong
- Jo Anne Worley
- Dick York

== Episodes ==
=== Season 1 (1959–60) ===
No. overall	No. in season	Title	Directed by	Written by	Original release date	Prod. code
1	1	"The Pit of Silence"	Paul Stanley	John Kneubuhl	October 5, 1959	3506
2	2	"The Black Pearl"	Robert Aldrich	Thelma Schnee	October 12, 1959	3501
3	3	"Paradise Lost"	Josef Leytes	Gene Levitt	October 26, 1959	3509
4	4	"The Lady from South Chicago"	Paul Stanley	Ken Kolb	November 2, 1959	3508
5	5	"The Derelict"	Roy Del Ruth	John McGreevey	November 9, 1959	3511
6	6	"Safari at Sea"	Robert Aldrich	Bill Barnett	November 16, 1959	3504
7	7	"Mission to Manila"	Bernard Girard	Richard Landau	November 23, 1959	3507
8	8	"The Raft"	Josef Leytes	John McGreevey	November 30, 1959	3515
9	9	"Peril at Pitcairn"	Roy Del Ruth	Alvin Sapinsley	December 7, 1959	3513
10	10	"The Bamboo Curtain"	Josef Leytes	Gene Levitt	December 14, 1959	3514
11	11	"Haunted"	Paul Stanley	George Worthing Yates	December 21, 1959	3518
12	12	"Somewhere South of Suva"	Gerald Mayer	Harry Muheim	December 28, 1959	3512
13	13	"Castaways"	Gerald Mayer	Robert Dillon	January 4, 1960	3516
14	14	"The Archer's Ring"	Bernard Girard	Daniel Mainwaring	January 11, 1960	3503
15	15	"Nightmare on Napuka"	Josef Leytes	Alvin Sapinsley	January 18, 1960	3519
16	16	"Walk Through the Night"	Paul Stanley	Richard Landau	January 25, 1960	3520
17	17	"Judith"	Paul Stanley	Stanford Whitmore	February 1, 1960	3510
18	18	"The Color of Venom"	James Neilson	William Froug	February 8, 1960	3521
19	19	"Isle of Eden"	Gerald Oswald	Story by : Ken Kolb; Teleplay by : Marion Parsonnet	February 22, 1960	3517
20	20	"Prisoner in Paradise"	Josef Leytes	John Kneubuhl	February 29, 1960	3522
21	21	"The Siege of Troy"	Gerald Mayer	Story by : Talbot Jennings; Teleplay by : George Worthing Yates	March 7, 1960	3523
22	22	"There is an Island"	James Neilson	Alvin Sapinsley	March 14, 1960	3524
23	23	"The Amazon"	Josef Leytes	William Froug	March 21, 1960	3525
24	24	"The Violent Journey"	Charles Rondeau	Richard Landau	March 28, 1960	3526
25	25	"The Forbidden Sea"	Bernard Girard	Alvin Sapinsley	April 4, 1960	3502
26	26	"Passage to Tua"	James Neilson	Story by : Stanford Whitmore; Teleplay by : Max Lamb	April 11, 1960	3527
27	27	"Heads, You Lose"	Josef Leytes	Michael Pertwee	April 18, 1960	3528
28	28	"The Death-Divers"	Felix Feist	Story by : Arnold Belgard; Teleplay by : Marion Parsonnet	April 25, 1960	3529
29	29	"Beached"	James Neilson	John McGreevey	May 2, 1960	3530
30	30	"Whip-Fight"	Felix Feist	Daniel Mainwaring	May 9, 1960	3531

=== Season 2 (1960–61) ===
No. overall	No. in season	Title	Directed by	Written by	Original release date	Prod. code
31	1	"Open for Diving"	Felix Feist	Ben Masselink	October 3, 1960	4504
32	2	"The Intruders"	Boris Sagal	John Kneubuhl	October 10, 1960	4506
33	3	"Once Around the Circuit"	Felix Feist	Fred Freiberger	October 17, 1960	4510
34	4	"Away From It All"	Justus Addiss	William Froug	October 24, 1960	4502
35	5	"The Krismen"	Justus Addiss	Story by : Rolf Bayer; Teleplay by : George Worthing Yates & Rolf Bayer	October 31, 1960	4508
36	6	"A Whale of a Tale"	Felix Feist	Gene Levitt	November 7, 1960	4501
37	7	"Hangman's Island"	Boris Sagal	Richard Alan Simmons	November 21, 1960	4503
38	8	"One Little Pearl"	Robert Florey	William Froug	November 28, 1960	4511
39	9	"The Big Surf"	Josef Leytes	Frank Chase	December 5, 1960	4505
40	10	"Daughter of Illusion"	Felix Feist	George W. George & Judy George	December 12, 1960	4507
41	11	"Sink or Swim"	Bud Townsend	William Froug	December 19, 1960	4509
42	12	"Incident in Suva"	Felix Feist	George W. George & Judy George	December 26, 1960	4513
43	13	"Treasure Hunt"	Robert Florey	Michael Pertwee	January 9, 1961	4514
44	14	"The Perils of Penrose"	Boris Sagal	John Kneubuhl	January 16, 1961	4512
45	15	"Mr. Flotsam"	Felix Feist	Gene Levitt	January 23, 1961	4515
46	16	"The Good Killing"	John Peyser	John Kneubuhl	January 30, 1961	4516
47	17	"Man Eater"	Felix Feist	Story by : John Kruse; Teleplay by : Michael Pertwee	February 6, 1961	4517
48	18	"Act of Piracy"	Tom Gries	Cyril Hume	February 13, 1961	4518
49	19	"Captain Butcher"	Felix Feist	Unknown	February 20, 1961	4519
50	20	"The Feather Cloak"	Charles F. Haas	Fred Freiberger	February 27, 1961	4520
51	21	"Angel of Death"	Robert Florey	William Froug	March 6, 1961	4521
52	22	"Who is Silvia?"	Felix Feist	Sam M. Hill & Max Lamb	March 13, 1961	4522
53	23	"The Wonderful Nightingale"	Tom Gries	John Tucker Battle	March 27, 1961	4523
54	24	"The Jonah Stone"	Gilbert L. Kay	Jay Simms	April 3, 1961	4524
55	25	"A Touch of Genius"	Boris Sagal	John Kneubuhl	April 10, 1961	4525
56	26	"The Serpent in the Garden"	Felix Feist	Juarez Roberts	April 17, 1961	4526
57	27	"A Penny a Day"	Robert Florey	Fred Freiberger	April 24, 1961	4527
58	28	"Wild Mangoes"	Alvin Ganzer	William Froug	May 1, 1961	4528
59	29	"Adam San"	Felix Feist	Gene Levitt	May 8, 1961	4529
60	30	"Hill of Ghosts"	Robert Florey	Devallon Scott	May 15, 1961	4530
61	31	"Flamin' Lady"	Justus Addiss	John Tucker Battle	May 22, 1961	4531
62	32	"Errand of Mercy"	Felix Feist	Story by : Robert Mintz & Allen Balter; Teleplay by : Jay Simms	May 29, 1961	4532
63	33	"Command at Sea"	Stuart Rosenberg	William Froug	June 5, 1961	4533
64	34	"Beachhead"	Felix Feist	Irwin Winehouse & A. Sanford Wolfe	June 12, 1961	4534
65	35	"Nightmare in the Sun"	Sutton Roley	Don Mullally	June 19, 1961	4535

=== Season 3 (1961–62) ===
No. overall	No. in season	Title	Directed by	Written by	Original release date	Prod. code
66	1	"Appointment at Tara-Bi"	Felix Feist	Irwin Winehouse & A. Sanford Wolfe	October 1, 1961	5504
67	2	"The Reluctant Hero"	Norman Foster	Carey Wilber	October 8, 1961	5506
68	3	"Vendetta"	Justus Addiss	Story by : Bob Mitchell & Gene Levitt; Teleplay by : Bob Mitchell	October 15, 1961	5505
69	4	"Queens Back to Back"	Justus Addiss	Story by : Austin Peterson; Teleplay by : Richard Neil Morgan	October 22, 1961	5508
70	5	"The Closing Circle"	Felix Feist	Story by : Michael Pertwee; Teleplay by : Mel Goldberg & Abram S. Ginnes	October 29, 1961	5507
71	6	"Show Me a Hero"	Mitchell Leisen	William Link & Richard Levinson	November 5, 1961	5510
72	7	"The Pretender"	Robert Florey	Story by : Louis Vittes; Teleplay by : George Bellak & Louis Vittes	November 12, 1961	5509
73	8	"The Fires of Kanau"	Justus Addiss	Edward J. Lasko	November 19, 1961	5502
74	9	"The Assassins"	Robert Florey	Fred Freiberger	November 26, 1961	5511
75	10	"One Way Ticket"	James B. Clark	Sam Ross	December 3, 1961	5513
76	11	"The Trial of Adam Troy"	Justus Addiss	Herman Epstein & Frank Ray	December 17, 1961	5514
77	12	"The Inheritance"	Ronald Weyman	Sam Ross	December 24, 1961	5503
78	13	"Survival"	David Orrick McDearmon	Fred Freiberger	December 31, 1961	5501
79	14	"Hurricane Audrey"	James B. Clark	Story by : Meyer Dolinsky; Teleplay by : Meyer Dolinsky & William Link & Richard Levinson	January 7, 1962	5516
80	15	"Once There Was a Princess"	James B. Clark	Judy George & George W. George	January 14, 1962	5519
81	16	"The Velvet Trap"	Mitchell Leisen	Rik Vollaerts	January 21, 1962	5512
82	17	"Policeman's Holiday"	Robert Florey	Carey Wilber & Pat Falken Smith	January 28, 1962	5517
83	18	"Please Believe Me"	Don Medford	Gene Wang	February 4, 1962	5515
84	19	"The Quest of Ambrose Feather"	Sutton Roley	Gene Levitt	February 11, 1962	5518
85	20	"Build My Gallows Low"	Sutton Roley	Story by : Gene Levitt; Teleplay by : Edward J. Lasko	February 18, 1962	5520
86	21	"The Secret Place"	James B. Clark	William Froug & Peter Barry	February 25, 1962	5521
87	22	"The Beach at Belle Anse"	Charles F. Haas	Unknown	March 4, 1962	5522
88	23	"A Bride for the Captain"	Jacques Tourneur	Jean Holloway	March 11, 1962	5523
89	24	"The Dream Merchant"	Sutton Roley	Edward J. Lakso	March 18, 1962	5524
90	25	"The Baby Sitters"	Richard L. Bare	Jean Holloway	March 25, 1962	5525
91	26	"Blueprint for Paradise"	Francis D. Lyon	Irwin Winehouse & A. Sanford Wolfe	April 1, 1962	5526

== Musical theme ==
"Theme from Adventures in Paradise" was composed by Lionel Newman. It has been recorded by numerous artists, including Arthur Lyman, Santo & Johnny, Rob E. G., The Atlantics, and Johnnie Spence and his Orchestra. Newman was a senior music director for Twentieth Century Fox Films and was conductor and music supervisor for the Adventures in Paradise series.

Lyrics to the theme were written by Dorcas Cochran, and are heard on the version recorded by Bing Crosby. Cochran is also credited as writer alongside Newman on some instrumental recordings.

A 45 rpm single of "Theme from Adventures in Paradise" by Jerry Byrd and his Steel Guitar charted in the United States, peaking in August 1960 at No. 97 in Billboard magazine and No. 80 in Cash Box

== Broadcast syndication ==
USA Network aired reruns of this series between 1984 and 1988.

== In popular culture ==
The show is referenced in Jimmy Buffett's song "We Are the People Our Parents Warned Us About" on his One Particular Harbour album in 1983. The song's bridge expresses the singer's desire to join the crew of the Tiki on their adventures:

Hey, Hey, Gardner McKay
Take us on the Leaky Tiki with you
Clear skies, bound for Shanghai

Sailing cross the ocean blue.
