= No Time for Sergeants =

Book by Mac Hyman

- First edition cover
- Author: Mac Hyman
- Language: English
- Publisher: Random House
- Publication date: October 1, 1954
- Publication place: United States
- Media type: Print

No Time for Sergeants is a 1954 novel by the American writer Mac Hyman, which was adapted into a teleplay on The United States Steel Hour, a popular Broadway play and 1958 motion picture, as well as a 1964 television series. The book chronicles the misadventures of a country bumpkin named Will Stockdale who is drafted into the U.S. Army during World War II and assigned to the U.S. Army Air Forces. Hyman was in the Army Air Forces during World War II.

== Adaptations in other media ==
Ira Levin adapted Hyman's novel for a one-hour teleplay that appeared as an episode on The United States Steel Hour television series in 1955. An expanded version appeared on Broadway at the Alvin Theatre later that year. In 1958, a film version was released.

=== Television adaptation (1955) ===
Ira Levin's adaptation of the novel appeared live on March 15, 1955, on the anthology series The United States Steel Hour. It starred Andy Griffith as Will Stockdale, Harry Clark as his nemesis and inadvertent mentor Sergeant Orville King, as well as Robert Emhardt, Eddie Le Roy and Alexander Clark. A kinescope recording of the broadcast is available.

=== Broadway play ===
An expanded version of the play, written by Ira Levin, opened on Broadway at the Alvin Theatre on October 20, 1955, produced by Maurice Evans and directed by Morton DaCosta. Griffith reprised his role, Myron McCormick played Sgt. King, Roddy McDowall played Will's army buddy Ben, and Don Knotts made his Broadway debut as Corporal Manual Dexterity. Scenic designer Peter Larkin won a Tony Award in 1956, and Andy Griffith was nominated for a Tony for Best Featured Actor. The play ran for a total of 796 performances, closing on September 14, 1957.

=== Motion picture ===
See No Time for Sergeants (1958 film)

No Time for Sergeants was filmed and released by Warner Bros. in 1958. The film was directed by Mervyn LeRoy and starred Griffith, McCormick, Knotts, and most of the rest of the original Broadway cast. Warner Bros. contract stars Nick Adams (as Stockdale's fellow draftee Benjamin B. Whitledge) and Murray Hamilton (as Irving S. Blanchard) joined the cast.

=== Television series ===
No Time for Sergeants
- Genre: Sitcom
- Based on: No Time for Sergeants by Mac Hyman
- Starring: Sammy Jackson; Harry Hickox; Kevin O'Neal
- Composer: George Duning
- Country of origin: United States
- Original language: English
- No. of seasons: 1
- No. of episodes: 34

Production
- Executive producers: William T. Orr; George Burns
- Cinematography: Robert Hoffman; Jacques R. Marquette
- Editors: Byron Chudnow; Milt Kleinberg
- Running time: 30 min
- Production companies: McCadden Productions; Warner Bros. Television

Original release
- Network: ABC
- Release: September 14, 1964 – May 3, 1965

No Time for Sergeants came to the small screen in Fall 1964. By this point, Griffith and Knotts were both established as stars of The Andy Griffith Show and were no longer available. The television series No Time for Sergeants starred Sammy Jackson who had had one line in the film version. When Jackson read that Warner Bros. was going to produce a television sitcom version of No Time for Sergeants, he wrote directly to Jack L. Warner, stating that he was the best choice for the role and asked Warner to watch a certain episode of the series Maverick as proof. Ten days later, Jackson was told to come to the studio to test for the role. Jackson won the role over several actors, including the better known Will Hutchins, a Warner Bros. Television contract star who formerly played the sympathetic Sugarfoot and had been in the No Time for Sergeants film.

Unlike Jim Nabors's Gomer Pyle (of The Andy Griffith Show spin-off of the same name, inspired by No Time for Sergeants), Jackson's Stockdale was not unintelligent. He possessed a considerable amount of common sense gained from experience, which he frequently brought to bear during the run of the series.

- His knowledge of farming leads him to give a better image interpretation analysis of an aerial photograph than Air Force Intelligence.
- The Air Force attempts to demonstrate the efficiency of its survival training by pitting an Air Force survival trained group against an untrained group including Stockdale in the wilderness. Stockdale, with his backwoods knowledge, takes charge and gives his party a comfortable time similar to being in a resort, while the trained group barely survives.
- Stockdale accepts latrine details as challenges rather than punishments and impresses the drill sergeant by how well he cleans the latrine.
- Stockdale demonstrates another more appealing quality over Gomer Pyle when he unflinchingly takes punches to his stomach from a karate expert with a smile and a good-natured lecture to his assailant until Stockdale ends his lecture by knocking the karate expert through a window.
- Stockdale has no reservations about drinking alcohol. However, the drill sergeant's attempts at getting him drunk fail, with the implication that Stockdale has built up a tolerance for alcohol from a lifetime of drinking moonshine whiskey.

Part of the William T. Orr-produced stable of Warner Bros. Television programs, the series was produced by George Burns's production company. It preceded Burns' own Wendy and Me sitcom (which starred Burns and Connie Stevens) on ABC's Monday night schedule. However, opposite The Andy Griffith Show, the series headlined by the original star of all the earlier versions of No Time For Sergeants, it was trounced in the ratings and only lasted one season. It was shown in the UK on ITV from 1965 to 1969.

Andy Clyde, formerly of The Real McCoys, had a supporting role in the television series as Grandpa Jim Anderson. Ann McCrea, while appearing as a regular on The Donna Reed Show, was cast as Amelia Taggert in the 1964 episode "O Krupnick, My Krupnick".

==== Episodes ====
No.	Title	Directed by	Written by	Original release date
1	"The Permanent Recruit"	Richard Crenna	William Burns, John L. Greene, Elon Packard and Norman Paul	September 14, 1964
2	"Blue's Wild Yonder"	Leslie H. Martinson	Unknown	September 21, 1964
3	"Bloodhounds Are Thicker Than Water"	Leslie H. Martinson	Unknown	September 28, 1964
4	"Grandpa's Airlift"	Leslie H. Martinson	Unknown	October 5, 1964
5	"Two Aces in the Hole"	Jeffrey Hayden	Unknown	October 12, 1964
6	"The Spirit of 75"	Sidney Lanfield	Seaman Jacobs & Ed James	October 19, 1964
7	"Bully for Ben"	Leslie H. Martinson	Unknown	October 26, 1964
8	"Will Gets a Right-Hand Man"	Leslie H. Martinson	Unknown	November 2, 1964
9	"Have No Uniform Will Travel"	Leslie H. Martinson	Unknown	November 9, 1964
10	"The Farmer in the Deal"	Jeffrey Hayden	Seaman Jacobs & Ed James	November 16, 1964
11	"Will Goes to Washington"	Hollingsworth Morse	Seaman Jacobs & Ed James	November 23, 1964
12	"The $100,000 Canteen"	Hollingsworth Morse	Unknown	November 30, 1964
13	"O Krupnick, My Krupnick"	Charles R. Rondeau	Unknown	December 7, 1964
14	"Do Me a Favor and Don't Do Me Any"	Sidney Lanfield	Seaman Jacobs & Ed James	December 14, 1964
15	"Stockdale's Island"	Charles R. Rondeau	Unknown	December 21, 1964
16	"Stockdale's Millions"	Charles R. Rondeau	Unknown	December 28, 1964
17	"Two for the Show"	Charles R. Rondeau	Unknown	January 4, 1965
18	"The Living End"	Charles R. Rondeau	Unknown	January 11, 1965
19	"My Fair Andy"	Charles R. Rondeau	Unknown	January 18, 1965
20	"Stockdale, General Nuisance"	Leslie H. Martinson	Unknown	January 25, 1965
21	"Too Many Stockdales"	Unknown	Unknown	February 1, 1965
22	"A Hatful of Muscles"	Unknown	Unknown	February 8, 1965
23	"Where There's a Way, There's a Will Stockdale"	Unknown	Unknown	February 15, 1965
24	"It Shouldn't Happen to a Sergeant"	Unknown	Unknown	February 22, 1965
25	"How Now, Brown Cow"	Unknown	Unknown	March 1, 1965
26	"The Case of the Revolving Witness"	Unknown	Unknown	March 8, 1965
27	"The Sergeant's Kimono"	Unknown	Unknown	March 15, 1965
28	"Stockdale of the Stockade"	Unknown	Unknown	March 22, 1965
29	"Will's Misfortune Cookie"	Unknown	Unknown	March 29, 1965
30	"The Day Blue Blew"	Unknown	Unknown	April 5, 1965
31	"Whortleberry Roots for Everyone"	Unknown	Unknown	April 12, 1965
32	"Andy Meets His Match"	Unknown	Unknown	April 19, 1965
33	"Target: Stockdale"	Unknown	Unknown	April 26, 1965
34	"The Velvet Wiggle"	Unknown	Unknown	May 3, 1965

== Comics ==
The four comics inspired by No Time For Sergeants

A Dell Four Color Issue 914 comic book version of this story, illustrated by Alex Toth and published in July 1958, follows the movie's narrative. Three follow up issues in the 1960s tied into the short-lived TV series that starred Sammy Jackson. Greg Theakston's Pure Imagination released The Alex Toth Reader, v2 in 2005. The art has been reproduced from the originals by a process that has been come to be known as Theakstonization, a process by which the original comics have the color leached out, leaving only the black and white line art, which then is reproduced to appear exactly as it did at the time of original publication. One of the stories offered is the original movie adaptation.
