= Climax! =

American anthology TV series

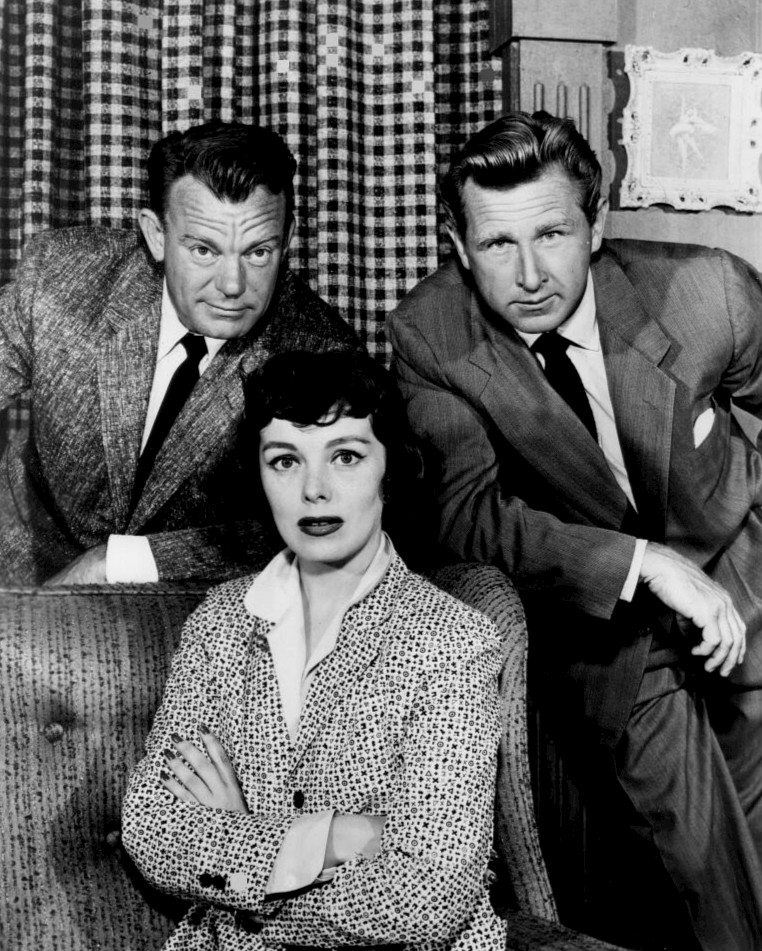
- Dennis O'Keefe, Phyllis Kirk, and Lloyd Bridges in "Edge of Terror", 1955.
- Also known as: Climax Mystery Theater
- Genre: Anthology
- Directed by: John Frankenheimer; Ida Lupino; Arthur Hiller; Allen Reisner; Ralph Nelson; Buzz Kulik; Paul Nickell; William H. Brown Jr. David Swift; Jack Smight; Don Medford; Anthony Barr
- Presented by: William Lundigan (1954–1958); Mary Costa (1956–1958)
- Theme music composer: Leith Stevens
- Composers: Jerry Goldsmith; Bernard Herrmann; Alex North
- Country of origin: United States
- Original language: English
- No. of seasons: 4
- No. of episodes: 166

Production
- Executive producer: Albert R. Broccoli
- Producers: Martin Manulis; Bretaigne Windust
- Camera setup: Television Film
- Running time: 47–50 minutes

Original release
- Network: CBS
- Release: October 7, 1954 – June 26, 1958

Climax! (later known as Climax Mystery Theater) is an American television anthology series that aired on CBS from 1954 to 1958. The series was hosted by William Lundigan and later co-hosted by Mary Costa. It was one of the few CBS programs of that era to be broadcast in color, using the massive TK-40A color cameras pioneered and manufactured by RCA, and used primarily by CBS's rival network, NBC (the broadcasting division of RCA). Many of the episodes were performed and broadcast live, but, although the series was transmitted in color, only black-and-white kinescope copies of some episodes survive to the present day. The series finished at #22 in the Nielsen ratings for the 1955–1956 season and #26 for 1956–1957.

== Production ==
In February 1955, Martin Manulis became the producer, replacing Bretaigne Windust. The trade publication Variety reported that the change in producers would be accompanied by a change in format. It said, "The sponsor, Chrysler, has been discontent with the restrictive suspense-horror formula," and that future episodes would be "designed to accent adventure and emotional climaxes rather than stark melodrama".

== Notable episodes ==
In 1954, the Climax! episode "Casino Royale" featured secret agent James Bond in a television adaptation of Ian Fleming's novel Casino Royale. It starred Barry Nelson as American secret agent "Jimmy Bond" and Peter Lorre as the villain Le Chiffre. It was the first screen adaptation of a James Bond novel, made before Eon Productions acquired the Bond film rights. Eon would later obtain the rights to Casino Royale in the late 1990s. This adaptation is available on DVD as a bonus feature on the MGM DVD release of the 1967 film adaptation of the novel.

The only other episode of Climax! available on DVD is Gore Vidal's adaptation of Robert Louis Stevenson's The Strange Case of Dr. Jekyll and Mr. Hyde, retitled on Climax! as "Dr. Jekyll & Mr. Hyde". It stars Michael Rennie, Cedric Hardwicke and Lowell Gilmore. It is available in the DVD box set Classic Sci-Fi TV—150 Episodes from Mill Creek Entertainment.

In an earlier episode of Climax!, an adaptation of Raymond Chandler's The Long Goodbye, actor Tristram Coffin, playing a dead body, arose in-shot and walked offstage. The event was widely covered in the media of the day, later becoming an urban legend that was attributed to Peter Lorre and the aforementioned adaptation of Casino Royale.

In addition, a small number of episodes from the series can be found on YouTube.

== Episodes ==
=== Series overview ===
Season	Episodes	Originally released	
Season	Episodes	First released	Last released
1	38	October 7, 1954	August 25, 1955
2	44	September 1, 1955	August 30, 1956
3	45	September 6, 1956	August 29, 1957
4	37	September 5, 1957	June 26, 1958

=== Season 1 (1954–55) ===
No. overall	No. in season	Title	Original release date
1	1	"The Long Goodbye"	October 7, 1954
2	2	"The Thirteenth Chair"	October 14, 1954
3	3	"Casino Royale"	October 21, 1954
4	4	"Sorry, Wrong Number"	November 4, 1954
5	5	"The Gioconda Smile"	November 11, 1954
6	6	"The After House"	November 25, 1954
7	7	"An Error in Chemistry"	December 2, 1954
8	8	"Epitaph for a Spy"	December 9, 1954
9	9	"The White Carnation"	December 16, 1954
10	10	"Nightmare in Copenhagen"	December 30, 1954
11	11	"The Bigger They Come"	January 6, 1955
12	12	"Escape from Fear"	January 13, 1955
13	13	"The Mojave Kid"	January 27, 1955
14	14	"The Leaf Out of the Book"	February 3, 1955
15	15	"The Valiant Men"	February 10, 1955
16	16	"The Box of Chocolates"	February 24, 1955
17	17	"South of the Sun"	March 3, 1955
18	18	"The Great Impersonation"	March 10, 1955
19	19	"The Darkest Hour"	March 24, 1955
20	20	"The Champion"	March 31, 1955
21	21	"Private Worlds"	April 7, 1955
22	22	"Flight 951"	April 21, 1955
23	23	"The First and the Last"	April 28, 1955
24	24	"The Deliverance of Sister Cecilia"	May 5, 1955
25	25	"No Stone Unturned"	May 19, 1955
26	26	"A Farewell to Arms"	May 26, 1955
27	27	"The Unimportant Man"	June 2, 1955
28	28	"The Dark Fleece"	June 16, 1955
29	29	"To Wake at Midnight"	June 23, 1955
30	30	"The Dance"	June 30, 1955
31	31	"Wild Stallion"	July 7, 1955
32	32	"The Escape of Mendes-France"	July 14, 1955
33	33	"The Healer"	July 21, 1955
34	34	"Dr. Jekyll and Mr. Hyde"	July 28, 1955
35	35	"One Night Stand"	August 4, 1955
36	36	"Edge of Terror"	August 11, 1955
37	37	"Fear Strikes Out"	August 18, 1955
38	38	"Deal a Blow"	August 25, 1955

=== Season 2 (1955–56) ===
No. overall	No. in season	Title	Original release date
39	1	"The Adventures of Huckleberry Finn"	September 1, 1955
40	2	"Public Pigeon #1"	September 8, 1955
41	3	"Silent Decision"	September 15, 1955
42	4	"Night of Execution"	September 22, 1955
43	5	"Sailor on Horseback"	September 29, 1955
44	6	"Thin Air"	October 13, 1955
45	7	"House of Shadows"	October 20, 1955
46	8	"The Pink Cloud"	October 27, 1955
47	9	"Schedule to Defraud"	November 10, 1955
48	10	"A Promise to Murder"	November 17, 1955
49	11	"Portrait in Celluloid"	November 24, 1955
50	12	"A Man of Taste"	December 1, 1955
51	13	"The Passport"	December 8, 1955
52	14	"The Day They Gave the Babies Away"	December 22, 1955
With Mary Treen.
53	15	"Bailout at 43,000 Feet"	December 29, 1955
54	16	"The Prowler"	January 5, 1956
55	17	"The Hanging Judge"	January 12, 1956
56	18	"The Secret of River Lane"	January 26, 1956
Starring Gigi Perreau
57	19	"Gamble on a Thief"	February 2, 1956
58	20	"The Fifth Wheel"	February 9, 1956
59	21	"Nightmare by Day"	February 23, 1956
60	22	"The Sound of Silence"	March 1, 1956
61	23	"The Louella Parsons Story"	March 8, 1956
62	24	"Pale Horse, Pale Rider"	March 22, 1956
63	25	"An Episode of Sparrows"	March 29, 1956
64	26	"Spin Into Darkness"	April 5, 1956
65	27	"The Lou Gehrig Story"	April 19, 1956
66	28	"Sit Down with Death"	April 26, 1956
67	29	"The Empty Room Blues"	May 3, 1956
68	30	"Flame-Out in T-6"	May 17, 1956
69	31	"The Shadow of Evil"	May 24, 1956
70	32	"Figures in Clay"	May 31, 1956
71	33	"Faceless Adversary"	June 7, 1956
72	34	"To Scream at Midnight"	June 14, 1956
73	35	"The Circular Staircase"	June 21, 1956
74	36	"A Trophy for Howard Davenport"	June 28, 1956
75	37	"Phone Call for Matthew Quade"	July 5, 1956
76	38	"Fear Is the Hunter"	July 12, 1956
77	39	"Fury at Dawn"	July 19, 1956
78	40	"The Man Who Lost His Head"	July 26, 1956
79	41	"Child of the Wind / Throw Away the Cane"	August 2, 1956
80	42	"No Right to Kill"	August 9, 1956
81	43	"The 78th Floor"	August 16, 1956
82	44	"Dark Wall"	August 30, 1956

=== Season 3 (1956–57) ===
No. overall	No. in season	Title	Original release date
83	1	"Bury Me Later"	September 6, 1956
84	2	"Burst of Violence"	September 13, 1956
85	3	"The Garsten Case"	September 20, 1956
86	4	"The Fog"	September 27, 1956
87	5	"Island in the City"	October 4, 1956
88	6	"Journey Into Fear"	October 11, 1956
89	7	"The Midas Touch"	October 18, 1956
90	8	"Night of the Heat Wave"	October 25, 1956
91	9	"Flight to Tomorrow"	November 8, 1956
92	10	"Night Shriek"	November 15, 1956
93	11	"The Chinese Game"	November 22, 1956
94	12	"The Secret Thread"	November 29, 1956
95	13	"Savage Portrait"	December 6, 1956
96	14	"Strange Hostage"	December 20, 1956
97	15	"Ten Minutes to Curfew"	December 27, 1956
98	16	"Carnival at Midnight"	January 3, 1957
99	17	"The Gold Dress"	January 17, 1957
100	18	"Circle of Destruction"	January 24, 1957
101	19	"The Trouble at Number 5"	January 31, 1957
102	20	"The Stalker"	February 7, 1957
103	21	"Stain of Honor"	February 14, 1957
104	22	"The Long Count"	February 21, 1957
105	23	"And Don't Ever Come Back"	February 28, 1957
106	24	"Night of a Rebel"	March 7, 1957
107	25	"Let It Be Me"	March 21, 1957
108	26	"Strange Sanctuary"	March 28, 1957
109	27	"Don't Touch Me"	April 4, 1957
110	28	"The Mad Bomber"	April 18, 1957
111	29	"Avalanche at Devil's Pass"	April 25, 1957
112	30	"The Strange Deaths at Burnleigh"	May 2, 1957
113	31	"Bait for the Tiger"	May 16, 1957
114	32	"The Hand of Evil"	May 23, 1957
115	33	"The Disappearance of Amanda Hale"	May 30, 1957
116	34	"Mr. Runyon of Broadway"	June 6, 1957
117	35	"The Man Who Stole the Bible"	June 13, 1957
118	36	"A Taste for Crime"	June 20, 1957
119	37	"The Trial of Captain Wirz"	June 27, 1957
120	38	"Locked in Fear" "False Witness"	July 4, 1957
121	39	"Payment for Judas"	July 11, 1957
122	40	"Walk a Tightrope"	July 18, 1957
123	41	"The High Jungle"	July 25, 1957
124	42	"The Giant Killer"	August 1, 1957
125	43	"Trail of Terror"	August 8, 1957
126	43	"Murder Is a Witch"	August 15, 1957
127	44	"The Stranger Within"	August 22, 1957
128	45	"Deadly Climate"	August 29, 1957

=== Season 4 (1957–58) ===
No. overall	No. in season	Title	Original release date
129	1	"Trial by Fire"	September 5, 1957
130	2	"The Secret of the Red Room"	September 12, 1957
131	3	"Necessary Evil"	September 19, 1957
132	4	"Along Came a Spider"	September 26, 1957
133	5	"Jacob and the Angels"	October 3, 1957
134	6	"Mask for the Devil"	October 10, 1957
135	7	"The Largest City in Captivity"	October 17, 1957
136	8	"Tunnel of Fear"	October 24, 1957
137	9	"Keep Me in Mind"	November 7, 1957
138	10	"Two Tests for Tuesday"	November 14, 1957
139	11	"A Matter of Life and Death"	November 21, 1957
140	12	"Murder Has a Deadline"	November 28, 1957
141	13	"The Devil's Brood"	December 5, 1957
142	14	"Hurricane Diane"	December 12, 1957
143	15	"To Walk the Night"	December 19, 1957
144	16	"Shadow of a Memory"	December 26, 1957
145	17	"Scream in Silence"	January 2, 1958
146	18	"Thieves over Tokyo"	January 16, 1958
147	19	"Sound of the Moon"	January 23, 1958
148	20	"Burst of Fire"	January 30, 1958
149	21	"Four Hours in White"	February 6, 1958
150	22	"The Secret Love of Johnny Spain"	February 20, 1958
151	23	"Albert Anastasia—His Life and Death"	February 27, 1958
152	24	"The Thief with the Big Blue Eyes"	March 6, 1958
153	25	"So Deadly My Love"	March 13, 1958
154	26	"The Great World and Timothy Colt"	March 27, 1958
155	27	"On the Take"	April 3, 1958
156	28	"The Volcano Seat"	April 10, 1958
157	29	"Shooting for the Moon"	April 24, 1958
158	30	"The Deadly Tattoo"	May 1, 1958
159	31	"The Big Success"	May 8, 1958
160	32	"The Disappearance of Daphne"	May 15, 1958
161	33	"Time of the Hanging"	May 22, 1958
162	34	"The Push-Button Giant"	May 29, 1958
163	35	"Spider Web"	June 5, 1958
164	36	"House of Doubt"	June 19, 1958
165	37	"Cabin B-13"	June 26, 1958

== Guest stars ==
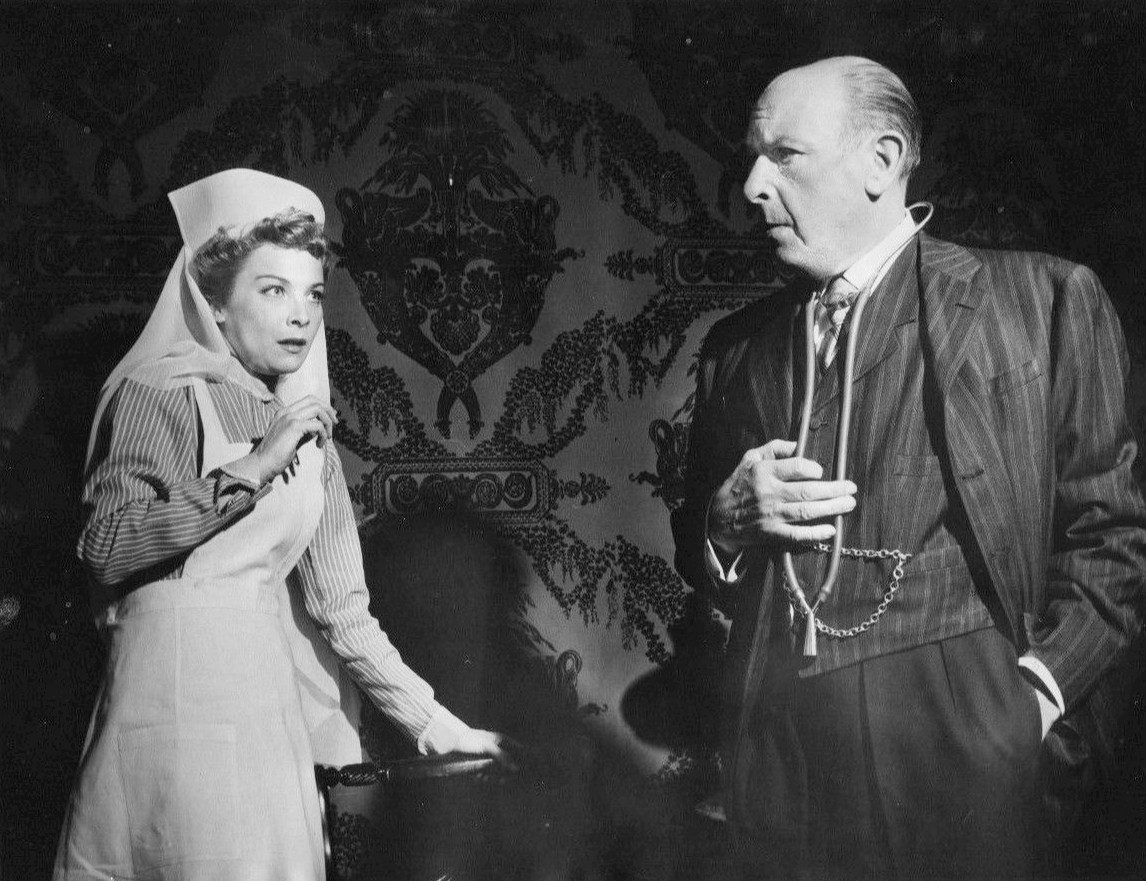
Joan Tetzel and Cedric Hardwicke in "Strange Death at Burnleigh" (1957)

(In alphabetical order)

- Julie Adams
- Anna Maria Alberghetti
- Eddie Albert
- Don Ameche
- Warner Anderson
- Edward Arnold
- Mary Astor
- Anne Bancroft
- Ethel Barrymore
- Ralph Bellamy
- Joan Bennett
- Jack Benny
- Ward Bond
- Richard Boone
- Lloyd Bridges
- Terry Burnham
- Raymond Burr
- Rory Calhoun
- Art Carney
- John Carradine
- Jack Carson
- John Cassavetes
- Lon Chaney Jr
- Linda Christian
- Steve Cochran
- Claudette Colbert
- Wendell Corey
- Hume Cronyn
- Mary Costa
- Linda Darnell
- Jane Darwell
- Laraine Day
- Brandon deWilde
- Paul Douglas
- Tom Drake
- Joanne Dru
- James Dunn
- Judith Evelyn
- Geraldine Fitzgerald
- Nina Foch
- John Forsythe
- Anne Francis
- Betty Furness
- Eva Gabor
- Zsa Zsa Gabor
- Farley Granger
- Bonita Granville
- Coleen Gray
- Peter Graves
- Jean Hagen
- Cedric Hardwicke
- Charlton Heston
- Paul Henreid
- Celeste Holm
- Jeffrey Hunter
- Kim Hunter
- Tab Hunter
- Ruth Hussey
- Vivi Janiss
- Louis Jourdan
- Katy Jurado
- Boris Karloff
- Phyllis Kirk
- Jack Klugman
- Angela Lansbury
- Peter Lawford
- Cloris Leachman
- June Lockhart
- Marjorie Lord
- Peter Lorre
- Tina Louise
- Barton MacLane
- Walter Matthau
- Raymond Massey
- Lee Marvin
- Mercedes McCambridge
- Dorothy McGuire
- Steve McQueen
- Patricia Medina
- Ralph Meeker
- Vera Miles
- Sal Mineo
- Thomas Mitchell
- Robert Mitchum
- Elizabeth Montgomery
- Agnes Moorehead
- Rita Moreno
- Barry Nelson
- Edmond O'Brien
- Margaret O'Brien
- Pat O'Brien
- Dennis O'Keefe
- Susan Oliver
- Maureen O'Sullivan
- Betsy Palmer
- Dick Powell
- Robert Preston
- Vincent Price
- Dale Robertson
- Edward G. Robinson
- Cesar Romero
- Ann Rutherford
- Cosmo Sardo
- Sylvia Sidney
- William Shatner
- Red Skelton
- Everett Sloane
- Dean Stockwell
- Elaine Stritch
- Yma Sumac
- Joan Tetzel
- Franchot Tone
- Audrey Totter
- Claire Trevor
- Lana Turner
- Eli Wallach
- Ethel Waters
- John Wayne
- James Whitmore
- Shelley Winters
- Joanne Woodward
- Teresa Wright
