= Burke's Law (1963 TV series) =

American detective series (1963–1966)

- Burke's Law 1963 series intro card
- Also known as: Amos Burke Secret Agent
- Genre: Crime drama; Action; Adventure; Detective fiction
- Created by: Frank D. Gilroy; Ivan Goff; Ernest Kinoy
- Starring: Gene Barry; Regis Toomey; Gary Conway; Leon Lontoc; Eileen O'Neill; Carl Benton Reid
- Theme music composer: Herschel Burke Gilbert
- Country of origin: United States
- Original language: English
- No. of seasons: 3
- No. of episodes: 81 (list of episodes)

Production
- Producer: Aaron Spelling
- Running time: 60 mins.
- Production companies: Four Star Television; Barbety

Original release
- Network: ABC
- Release: September 20, 1963 – January 12, 1966

Related
- Burke's Law (1994); Honey West

Burke's Law is an American detective television series that aired on ABC from 1963 to 1966. The show starred Gene Barry as millionaire captain of the Los Angeles Police Department's homicide division Amos Burke, who is chauffeured around to solve crimes in his 1962 Rolls-Royce Silver Cloud II complete with an early car phone.

The original series was converted into a spy drama, Amos Burke Secret Agent, in its third and final season. The series was revived in 1994–1995 on CBS, with Barry reprising the role of the millionaire detective.

== Premise ==
The show shares stylistic similarities with Barry's previous series, Bat Masterson, in which he played a debonair lawman of the Old West. During the opening credits, as the title flashes onscreen, a woman's voice seductively pronounces the words "It's Burke's Law!" The title also reflects Burke's habit of dispensing wisdom to his underlings in a professorial manner, e.g., "Never ask a question unless you already know the answer. Burke's Law."

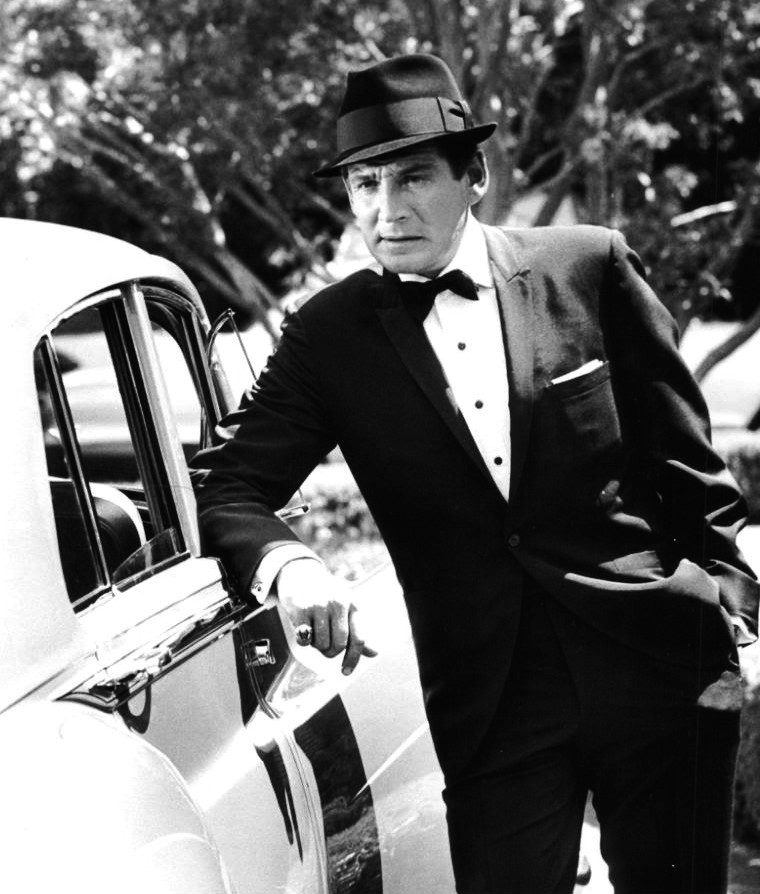
A 1963 publicity photo.

The anomaly of a millionaire police captain is explained in a first episode conversation between Detective Tim Tilson and a potential witness. Told that Amos Burke is Head of the Homicide Division and a millionaire, the witness asks: "Why a cop?"

Tilson: "Why're you a construction man?"
Witness: "It's what I do best."
Tilson: "That's why he's a cop."

A variant is repeated in the 1994 revival.

The title of each episode begins with the words "Who Killed...?" with the name or description of the victim (who invariably dies or is found dead in the show's opening minutes) completing it. Five or six "special guest stars" comprise the list of suspects. Burke is then driven to the crime scene in his Rolls-Royce by his loyal chauffeur, Henry.

Burke is an eligible bachelor whose dates with various gorgeous women are often interrupted by calls to begin a new case. He can be—though rarely—distracted by an alluring woman, and is often the object of much female interest.

Burke is assisted by Detective Tim Tilson (Gary Conway), Detective Sergeant Les Hart (Regis Toomey), and chauffeur Henry (Filipino actor Leon Lontoc). Two recurring characters were coroner George McLeod/McCloud (Michael Fox) and desk sergeant Gloria Ames (Eileen O'Neill).

Tilson is a brilliant, thorough young detective whose skill at finding clues and tracing references results in his "almost" solving the crime, only to be outflanked by Burke's cool intuition and years of experience. Les Hart is a no-nonsense, seen-it-all veteran (perhaps a nod to Toomey's numerous roles as cops in feature films) who has known Burke for years and is on a first name basis, while Henry often provides comic relief. The characters share a team camaraderie reflected in mild jokes about each other's foibles.

== Production ==
The role of Amos Burke actually antedated Barry's series, having been played by Dick Powell in "Who Killed Julie Greer?," the initial episode of The Dick Powell Show in September 1961. The first incarnation of the series was produced by Powell's company, Four Star Television. As in the later series, the episode features several well-known TV and movie stars in cameo appearances as suspects – one of whom is the murderer (in the original Dick Powell episode Ronald Reagan played one of the suspects). John Damler played Sgt. Hart, the role played in the show by Regis Toomey. Leon Lontoc was the only cast member of the episode to reprise his role in the later series.

In the final season of the original series (1965–1966), the show was given a complete overhaul and retitled Amos Burke Secret Agent. Burke went to work for a secret government agency, but still drove around in his Rolls, which had been discreetly bulletproofed by the agency. The supporting cast of the earlier seasons was dropped, as was the heavy use of celebrity cameos. According to producer Aaron Spelling, the change was forced by ABC in reaction to the success of The Man from U.N.C.L.E. and the James Bond films. The change was disliked by Barry and the crew. Ratings plummeted, and it was cancelled midway through the season.

As of 2010, the Rolls-Royce used in the original 1963 series was owned by a collector in Palm Beach, Florida.

== Cast ==
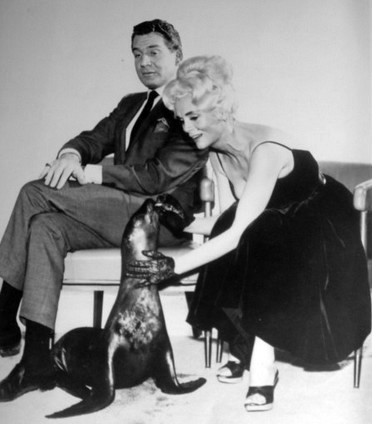
Barry with Marie Wilson in the episode "Who Killed Marty Kelso?".

=== Main ===
- Gene Barry as Capt. Amos Burke
- Gary Conway as Det. Tim Tilson (seasons 1–2)
- Regis Toomey as Det. Sgt. Les Hart (seasons 1–2)
- Leon Lontoc as Henry (seasons 1–2)

=== Recurring ===
- Eileen O'Neill as Sgt. Ames (seasons 1–2)
- Michael Fox, as Coroner George McCleod/McCloud (seasons 1–2)
- Carl Benton Reid as The Man (season 3: Amos Burke Secret Agent)

=== Regulars ===
In addition, a number of actors appeared regularly in various roles through seasons 1 and 2:

- June Kim variously as "girl/housegirl/maid" (season 1)
- Don Gazzaniga as policemen (seasons 1–2)
- Bob Bice, bit parts (seasons 1–2)
- Paul Dubov, bit parts; wrote various episodes (seasons 1–2)
- Hy Averback, bit parts; directed various episodes (season 1)
- Army Archerd as himself/bit parts (seasons 1–2)

=== Guest stars (partial list) ===
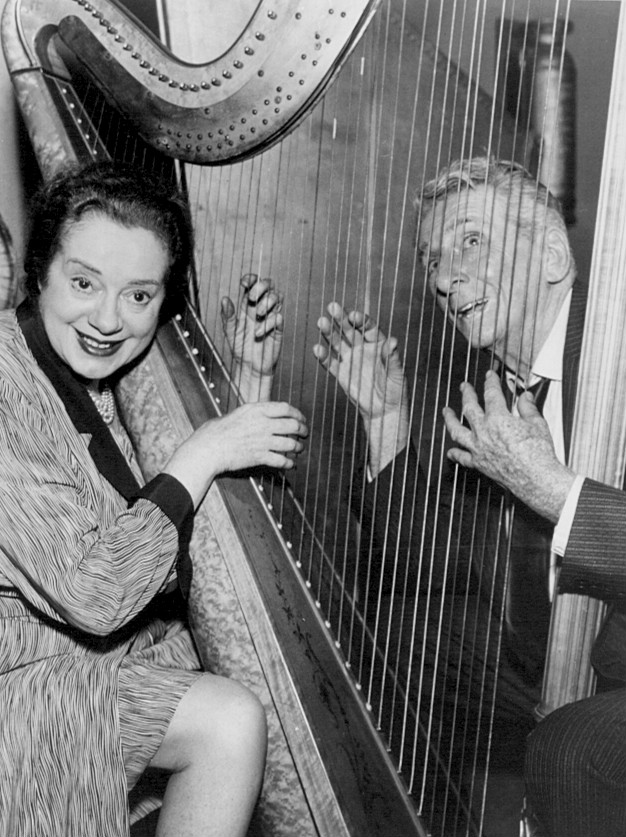
Elsa Lanchester and Edward Everett Horton from episode "Who Killed Eleanora Davis?" (1963).

In alphabetical order:

Eddie Albert, June Allyson, Don Ameche, Mary Astor, Frankie Avalon, Ed Begley, William Bendix, Joan Blondell, Ann Blyth, Hoagy Carmichael, Rory Calhoun, John Cassavetes, Dick Clark, Jeanne Crain, Broderick Crawford, Arlene Dahl, Sammy Davis Jr., Linda Darnell, Laraine Day, Yvonne De Carlo, William Demarest, Andy Devine, Diana Dors, Joanne Dru, Dan Duryea, Barbara Eden, Nanette Fabray, Felicia Farr, Rhonda Fleming, Nina Foch, Anne Francis, Annette Funicello, Eva Gabor, Zsa Zsa Gabor, Gloria Grahame, Jane Greer, Tammy Grimes, George Hamilton, Phil Harris, June Havoc, Richard Haydn, Celeste Holm, Oscar Homolka, Edward Everett Horton, Rodolfo Hoyos Jr., Tab Hunter, Betty Hutton, Martha Hyer, Carolyn Jones, Buster Keaton, Eartha Kitt, Frankie Laine, Fernando Lamas, Dorothy Lamour, Elsa Lanchester, Lauren Lane, Gypsy Rose Lee, Ida Lupino, Tina Louise, Paul Lynde, Jayne Mansfield, Marilyn Maxwell, Virginia Mayo, Burgess Meredith, Una Merkel, Dina Merrill, Vera Miles, Sal Mineo, Ricardo Montalbán, Elizabeth Montgomery, Agnes Moorehead, Rita Moreno, Sheree North, Susan Oliver, Janis Paige, Fess Parker, Suzy Parker, Bert Parks, Walter Pidgeon, Zasu Pitts, Juliet Prowse, Basil Rathbone, Aldo Ray, Martha Raye, Carl Reiner, Don Rickles, Ruth Roman, Cesar Romero, Mickey Rooney, Gena Rowlands, Janice Rule, Soupy Sales, Telly Savalas, Lizabeth Scott, William Shatner, Nancy Sinatra, Jan Sterling, Jill St. John, Gale Storm, Susan Strasberg, Gloria Swanson, Terry-Thomas, Jack Tornek, Miyoshi Umeki, Mamie Van Doren, James Whitmore, Michael Wilding, Chill Wills, Ed Wynn, Keenan Wynn.

== Episodes ==
Season	Episodes	Originally released		Series title
Season	Episodes	First released	Last released	Series title
1	32	September 20, 1963	May 8, 1964	Burke's Law
2	32	September 16, 1964	May 5, 1965	Burke's Law
3	17	September 15, 1965	January 12, 1966	Amos Burke Secret Agent

== Music ==
The musical score for Burke's Law was largely the work of Herschel Burke Gilbert, who also wrote the show's theme, although Richard Shores and Joseph Mullendore also composed scores. Gilbert's theme was rearranged for Amos Burke, Secret Agent.

== Home media ==
The following DVD sets of Burke's Law have been released by VCI Entertainment.

DVD set	Episodes	Release date
Burke's Law: Season 1, Volume 1	16	April 29, 2008
Burke's Law: Season 1, Volume 2	16	November 18, 2008

VCI released the complete first season on April 5, 2016.

== Spin-off ==
Actress Anne Francis, who appears in season-one episode "Who Killed Wade Walker?" and as female private detective Honey West in season-two episode "Who Killed the Jackpot?", starred in the 30-episode spin-off Honey West TV series. Francis later reprised the role on the 1994 revival series, in the episode "Who Killed Nick Hazard?"

== 1994 revival series ==
In 1994, CBS premiered a revival of the show with the same title Burke's Law. The revival was produced by Aaron Spelling's production company, Spelling Productions.

In the revival of the show, Burke was back at work as a police detective — now as a deputy chief instead of a captain — and was assisted by his son, Peter (Peter Barton), a police detective. The only character to return was Henry, now played by Danny Kamekona (Lontoc had died in 1974).
