= List of Burke's Law episodes =

Burke's Law was a detective television series that aired three seasons between 1963-1966. The third season, aired between 1965-1966, was overhauled into a spy drama, and renamed Amos Burke Secret Agent.

== Series overview ==
Season	Episodes	Originally released		Series title
Season	Episodes	First released	Last released	Series title
1	32	September 20, 1963	May 8, 1964	Burke's Law
2	32	September 16, 1964	May 5, 1965	Burke's Law
3	17	September 15, 1965	January 12, 1966	Amos Burke Secret Agent

== Episodes ==
=== Season 1 (1963–64) ===
No. overall	No. in season	Title	Directed by	Written by	Original release date
1	1	"Who Killed Holly Howard?"	Hy Averback	Albert Beich & William H. Wright	September 20, 1963
Model Holly Howard is found murdered, and the only clues seem to link a trio of wealthy Texans to her death. Guest stars: Elizabeth Allen, William Bendix, Bruce Cabot, Rod Cameron, Fred Clark, Jay C. Flippen, Sir Cedric Hardwicke, Stephen McNally, Suzy Parker, ZaSu Pitts, Will Rogers Jr.
2	2	"Who Killed Mr. X?"	Don Weis	Lewis Reed	September 27, 1963
A body turns up at a merry-go-round. There are no identifying papers and the labels have been removed from the man's clothing. The few clues available point Burke toward an actress under exclusive contract to Flood, a rarely seen industrialist. Burke discovers a number of women are under such exclusive contracts. Then, the detective discovers the dead man was Flood himself. Guest stars: Jim Backus, Barrie Chase, Ann Harding, Dina Merrill, Elizabeth Montgomery, Charlie Ruggles, Soupy Sales.
3	3	"Who Killed Cable Roberts?"	Jeffrey Hayden	Gwen Bagni	October 4, 1963
Cable Roberts, a legendary writer, documentary filmmaker, and hunter in the Hemingway mold, is found murdered in his study. There are three significant clues: he was killed with one of his own rifles, he was shot twice big-game style, and his body was propped against a wall alongside his many hunting trophies. Guest stars: Mary Astor, Zsa Zsa Gabor, Charlene Holt, Paul Lynde, John Saxon, Lizabeth Scott, Chill Wills.
4	4	"Who Killed Harris Crown?"	Don Weis	John Meredyth Lucas	October 11, 1963
Burke's investigation of the murder of Harris Crown is complicated by the fact that Mrs. Crown is pregnant... and not by her husband. Guest stars: Lola Albright, Joan Blondell, Barbara Eden, Eva Gabor, Gene Nelson, Juliet Prowse, Don Rickles, Ruth Roman.
5	5	"Who Killed Julian Buck?"	Don Weis	Albert Beich & William H. Wright	October 18, 1963
Julian Buck, respected author, is found stabbed to death in his study. The manuscript for his latest novel is missing, but one curious item is found: an extra rubber cap for the feet of his typewriter stand. Guest stars: Ed Begley, Karl Boehm, Corinne Calvet, Rita Moreno, Terry-Thomas, Keenan Wynn.
6	6	"Who Killed Alex Debbs?"	Don Weis	Harlan Ellison	October 25, 1963
The publisher of a girlie magazine is murdered at one of his own key clubs. Guest stars: Arlene Dahl, Sammy Davis, Jr., Diana Dors, John Ireland, Burgess Meredith, Suzy Parker, Jan Sterling.
7	7	"Who Killed Sweet Betsy?"	Hy Averback	Edith R. Sommer	November 1, 1963
One of four identical sisters with odd personalities is poisoned with cyanide at the residence of a beach bum. Burke and Tilson uncover a family history of suspicious deaths. Guest stars: Richard Carlson, Gladys Cooper, John Ericson, Carolyn Jones, Stuart Margolin (bit part), Michael Wilding.
8	8	"Who Killed Billy Jo?"	Hy Averback	Tony Barrett	November 8, 1963
A recording star is murdered. Was the killer his agent, his sister, his music arranger, or someone else? Guest stars: Nick Adams, Ken Berry (bit part), Laraine Day, Howard Duff, Kelly Gordon, Phil Harris, Tina Louise, Ida Lupino, Marlyn Mason (bit part), David Niven (cameo), Cesar Romero, Elaine Stewart, Tom Tully.
9	9	"Who Killed Wade Walker?"	Stanley Z. Cherry	Robert O'Brien	November 15, 1963
Wealthy Wade Walker' plane blows up in mid-air. Who killed him, his partner or one of his four prospective brides? Guest stars: Rhonda Fleming, Jay C. Flippen, Anne Francis, Martha Hyer, Frankie Laine, Nancy Sinatra, Dana Wynter.
10	10	"Who Killed the Kind Doctor?"	Don Taylor	Edith R. Sommer	November 29, 1963
Dr. Eric Techman, a fashionable LA psychiatrist, telephones Burke to warn him of an impending murder — his own — by one of his patients. But Techman is gunned down before he can name the killer. Guest stars: Joan Caulfield, Annette Funicello, Celeste Holm, James MacArthur, Dewey Martin, Sheree North, Susan Oliver, Phillip Reed (cameo).
11	11	"Who Killed Purity Mather?"	Walter Grauman	Harlan Ellison	December 6, 1963
Prior to her apparent murder, a practicing witch sends Amos a message predicting her murder with a list of five suspects from the occult arts. Guest stars: Janet Blair, Wally Cox, Nancy Kovack, Charlie Ruggles, Telly Savalas, Gloria Swanson.
12	12	"Who Killed Cynthia Royal?"	Charles F. Haas	Jameson Brewer & Day Keene	December 13, 1963
Missing Siamese cat Deborah is Burke's prime clue to Cynthia Royal's murder. The victim had just arrived from Chicago to reunite with her estranged husband. The husband had been wooing a nightclub singer... which leads Burke to the nightclub's owner/comic and his attorney. The trail leads to two beatniks, the return of Deborah and the solution of the case. Guest stars: Frankie Avalon, Macdonald Carey, Stubby Kaye, Marilyn Maxwell, Una Merkel, Kathy Nolan.
13	13	"Who Killed Eleanora Davis?"	Herman Hoffman	Don Taylor	December 20, 1963
"Professor" Kingston's sideshow-style 'museum' includes a supposedly genuine electric chair - but someone replaced the dummy with a real body. Guest stars: Nick Adams, Jane Darwell, Edward Everett Horton, Arthur Hunnicutt, Dean Jones, Elsa Lanchester, Terry Moore, Debra Paget.
14	14	"Who Killed Beau Sparrow?"	David Orrick McDearmon	John Meredyth Lucas	December 27, 1963
Burke attends a pool party at tycoon Victor Haggerty's mansion when dashing Beau Sparrow is thrown into the pool by a faulty diving apparatus, and dies. Who or what killed him? Was the killer the tycoon, his spoiled pampered wife, her paid companion, the countess who was Beau's current flame, the tough-as-nails secretary, or the blowhard businessman? Guest stars: June Allyson, Rosemarie Bowe, Yvonne de Carlo, Jack Haley, Agnes Moorehead, Ken Murray.
15	15	"Who Killed Jason Shaw?"	Stanley Z. Cherry	Lewis Reed	January 3, 1964
A strange girl named Lucy Brewer finds a corpse in the shower. Burke's suspects include an old friend, a cultivator of unusual plants, a wine snob and a famous used car salesman... but what did they all have in common? (Scheduled to air on Nov. 22, 1963, this episode was postponed following the assassination of President John F. Kennedy.) Guest stars: Tammy Grimes, Richard Haydn, Oscar Homolka, Joyce Jameson, Burgess Meredith, Keenan Wynn.
16	16	"Who Killed Snookie Martinelli?"	Robert Ellis Miller	Gwen Bagni & Paul Dubov	January 10, 1964
Has Amos Burke himself been murdered? No, but it's definitely a dead ringer. Guest Stars: Hoagy Carmichael, Broderick Crawford, Arlene Dahl, Carl Reiner, Cesar Romero, Janice Rule.
17	17	"Who Killed What's His Name?"	Don Taylor	Tony Barrett	January 17, 1964
A bank robbery ends with the unprovoked shooting death of its owner, financier Victor S. Barrows. The key to the mystery: one of perpetrators is a man so average, no one can describe him. Guest stars: Elizabeth Allen, Edgar Bergen, Dick Clark, Andy Devine, Reginald Gardiner, Virginia Grey, Spike Jones, Elizabeth MacRae, Gena Rowlands.
18	18	"Who Killed Madison Cooper?"	Jeffrey Hayden	Lewis Reed	January 24, 1964
A shady attorney carrying a lot of money dies after calling Burke - to say he's been murdered. Guest stars: Jeanne Crain, Byron Foulger, Marty Ingels, Carolyn Jones, Dorothy Lamour, Kevin McCarthy, Louis Quinn, Terry-Thomas, David White.
19	19	"Who Killed April?"	Lewis Allen	Albert Beich	January 31, 1964
Carhop waitress April Adams is found murdered in an automobile scrapyard. The discovery that she had over $40,000 in the bank indicates that she had a second income that was both lucrative and illicit. Guest stars: Eddie Bracken, Jack Carter, Hans Conried, Gloria Grahame, Mark Goddard, Martha Hyer.
20	20	"Who Killed Carrie Cornell?"	Byron Paul	Jay Dratler	February 14, 1964
Carrie Cornell, singer and model, is found murdered on a beach. A photograph of her in Girlicue magazine links her to sleazy millionaire Martin Van Martin - who has disappeared. Guest stars: Michael Ansara, Jim Backus, Fernando Lamas, Diana Lynn, William Shatner, Joanie Sommers.
21	21	"Who Killed His Royal Highness?"	Don Weis	Gwen Bagni & Paul Dubov	February 21, 1964
A man claiming to be an exiled Russian prince — not that anyone ever believed it — is murdered. Guest stars: Linda Darnell, Sheldon Leonard, Elizabeth Montgomery, Bert Parks, Mickey Rooney, Telly Savalas, Gale Storm.
22	22	"Who Killed Marty Kelso?"	Don Taylor	Tony Barrett	February 28, 1964
Ruthless Hollywood agent Marty Kelso is murdered and leaves behind a plethora of suspects, including one new and three ex-wives. Guest stars: Army Archerd (cameo, himself), Herschel Bernardi, John Ericson, Glynis Johns, Diane McBain, Mary Ann Mobley (cameo), Luciana Paluzzi, Don Taylor, Marie Wilson.
23	23	"Who Killed Avery Lord?"	Richard Kinon	Lewis Reed	March 6, 1964
Burke and his team investigate the murder of a wealthy industrial designer. Guest stars: Broderick Crawford, Felicia Farr, Chill Wills, Ed Wynn.
24	24	"Who Killed Andy Zygmunt?"	Don Taylor	Harlan Ellison	March 13, 1964
Pop artist Andy Zygmunt is fatally impaled on the spikes of one of his creations. The discovery that he blackmailed people into buying his works provides a motive and five suspects: his last four customers and the possessor of a missing fifth. Guest stars: Ann Blyth, Macdonald Carey, Tab Hunter, Aldo Ray, Deborah Walley, Jack Weston.
25	25	"Who Killed the Paper Dragon?"	Marc Daniels	Jameson Brewer & Day Keene	March 20, 1964
During Chinese New Year celebrations, a body is found concealed in a car. Guest stars: Howard Duff, Dan Duryea, Barbara Eden, James Shigeta, Ginny Tiu, Miyoshi Umeki.
26	26	"Who Killed Molly?"	Don Weis	Albert Beich	March 27, 1964
Brunette housewife Molly Brown is found dead in her shower, the apparent victim of a fall and drowning. But the autopsy shows that she was strangled, and the discovery of blond wig hairs on four of her dresses is the first indication of her very busy secret life. Guest stars: Hoagy Carmichael, Nanette Fabray, Jay C. Flippen, Jayne Mansfield, Arthur O'Connell.
27	27	"Who Killed WHO IV?"	Don Weis	Gwen Bagni & Paul Dubov	April 3, 1964
Socialite equestrian William Henry Otis IV, nicknamed WHO IV ("Who Four"), is beaten to death in his stable with a horseshoe from a riding trophy. The suspects are the regulars in his weekly fox hunts, among them Burke's old flame Jennifer and her husband St. John ("Sinjin") Carlisle, and, of course, the butler. Guest stars: Lola Albright, Steve Cochran, Reginald Gardiner, Patsy Kelly, Nancy Kovack, Fess Parker.
28	28	"Who Killed Annie Foran?"	Lewis Allen	Tony Barrett	April 10, 1964
Party girl Annie Foran is found strangled in the back seat of a customer's car at the exclusive restaurant Club Nova. Suspicion falls on her ex-boyfriend, baseball sensation Eddie Dineen, who was there at the time in the company of his mentor, the acerbic columnist Whitman Saunders, and Saunder's assistant, Milo Morgan. Guest stars: Don Ameche, John Cassavetes, Jackie Coogan (cameo), Wendell Corey, Dee Hartford, Gena Rowlands.
29	29	"Who Killed My Girl?"	Don Weis	Tony Barrett	April 17, 1964
Using a silenced .38 revolver, someone murders heiress Diana Mercer in her bedroom after she's been dropped off by that night's date — her old flame, Amos Burke. As he investigates, he discovers the murdered woman was not the one he knew and loved years earlier. Guest stars: Richard Carlson, Jane Greer, Ruta Lee, Stephen McNally, Gene Raymond, Don Taylor.
30	30	"Who Killed the Eleventh Best Dressed Woman in the World?"	Don Weis	Edith R. Sommer	April 24, 1964
Nirvana, an upscale health spa for women only, is disrupted when husband-stealing socialite Celia Bannerman is found murdered in the mud bath. Suspicion centers on the five women who shared her bungalow. (Trivia: sign on electrician's truck in opening scene reads "Weis Electric," director's name.) Guest stars: Hazel Court, Jeanne Crain, Joanne Dru, Martha Hyer, Susan Strasberg.
31	31	"Who Killed Don Pablo?"	Richard Kinon	Gwen Bagni & Paul Dubov	May 1, 1964
A waxwork museum also turns out to contain a corpse. Guest stars: John Cassavetes, Cecil Kellaway, Patricia Medina, Agnes Moorehead, Cesar Romero, Joan Staley, Irene Tedrow, Forrest Tucker.
32	32	"Who Killed 1/2 of Glory Lee?"	Don Weis	Harlan Ellison	May 8, 1964
Unpleasant Benjamin Glory, one half partner of the Glory Lee fashion house, is found dead in a crashed elevator. But he was dead before he ever entered it, killed by "a sharp and blunt instrument." Guest stars: Joan Blondell, Nina Foch, Anne Helm, Betty Hutton, Buster Keaton, Gisele MacKenzie, Cheerio Meredith, Dawn Wells.

=== Season 2 (1964–65) ===
No. overall	No. in season	Title	Directed by	Written by	Original release date
33	1	"Who Killed the Surf Broad?"	Don Taylor	Tony Barrett	September 16, 1964
Rising actress and beach queen Tina Romaine surfs a difficult wave, walks a few steps, and drops dead. A bullet grazed her right temple, but the wound was superficial and the autopsy finds that she was killed by an archaic poison. Posing as a beach bum, Tim goes undercover to infiltrate the surfing crowd. Guest stars: Theodore Bikel, Macdonald Carey, Sharon Farrell (bit part), Dorothy Lamour, Dewey Martin.
34	2	"Who Killed Vaudeville?"	Gene Nelson	Gwen Bagni & Paul Dubov	September 23, 1964
The burlesque comedy team of Witt, Watt and Who (now an accountant, a desk clerk and a bartender with a dark secret), a professor of the striptease, a tap dancer, the manager of a hotel for showfolk, a unicyclist — any one of them may have "killed vaudeville," but one of them certainly poisoned baggy pants clown Rags McGuire, who was about to be featured in an event at the Hollywood Bowl. Burke corners the killer at the Bowl and almost brings the house down. Guest stars: Jim Backus, William Demarest, Paul Dubov (bit part) Eddie Foy Jr., Phil Harris, Gypsy Rose Lee, Gene Nelson, Gloria Swanson.
35	3	"Who Killed Cassandra Cass?"	Jerry Hopper	Lorenzo Semple Jr.	September 30, 1964
While the water for her before-dinner bath is being drawn, high society blackmailer Cassandra Cass is gunned down in her bedroom in her mansion. The prime suspects are her four victims, all of whom had been invited to dinner that evening. And, of course, there's the butler. Guest stars: Lola Albright, William Bendix, Shelley Berman, Fritz Feld (bit part), Nancy Kovack, Elsa Lanchester, Louis Nye, Nehemiah Persoff.
36	4	"Who Killed the Horne of Plenty?"	Richard Kinon	Tony Barrett	October 7, 1964
While hosting a garden party on a sunny Sunday afternoon, modeling mogul Charles Lee Horne telephones the homicide squad and asks for Burke. A single rifle shot ends both the call and Horne's life. The investigation takes an unexpected and disturbing twist when one of Horne's models, Felice Knight, files an internal affairs complaint alleging that Tim helped her to blackmail the victim. Guest stars: Vera Miles, Terry Moore, Ed Platt (bit part), John Saxon, David Wayne.
37	5	"Who Killed Everybody?"	Richard Kinon	Richard Levinson & William Link	October 14, 1964
Four poker buddies celebrate the first anniversary of their weekly games with a private party at the Hillsdale Country Club. The festivities end when all four men are killed by a bottle of poisoned wine. There is no shortage of suspects. Besides having four unhappy wives, the men had incurred the ire of Butterfield, the club's historian, baseball coach, and busybody. Guest stars: Corinne Calvet, Arlene Dahl, June Havoc, Margaret Leighton, Alan Mowbray, Susan Silo.
38	6	"Who Killed Mr. Cartwheel?"	Don Weis	Gwen Bagni & Paul Dubov	October 21, 1964
Burke goes cowboy at a tourist-style Old West town, after the hanging of Emerson Cartwheel at a coin auction. The clue is a valuable rare coin used to kill the victim, but before Burke can investigate, he's tossed in the hoosegow by the local honorary (and very lovely) female sheriff of Epitaph Flats. After a dramatic jailbreak, Burke questions the town drunk, a "gunslinges" in the Wild West show, the victim's business rival, a lady blacksmith and a very Brooklynese "Native American." Guest stars: Ed Begley, Fred Clark, Patsy Kelly, Sheldon Leonard, Diane McBain.
39	7	"Who Killed Cornelius Gilbert?"	Don Taylor	Lewis Reed	October 28, 1964
The life of hotel magnate Cornelius Gilbert comes to an electrifying finish when somebody hot-wires the metal ladder in his swimming pool. A torn piece of plaid cloth, a gold St. Christopher's medal, and Gilbert's annual round-the-world charter flight are the clues. Guest stars: Edgar Bergen, Dane Clark, Barbara Eden, Nanette Fabray.
40	8	"Who Killed Lenore Wingfield?"	Don Weis	Leigh Chapman	November 4, 1964
Murdered Lenore has left a note that she's changing her will with the heir as nephew Jay Boy, who is involved with daughter of Jim Clover who needs Lenore's land to complete his development, but Jay Boy's fiancée Effie Mae is in town. Guest stars: Anne Helm, Victor Jory, Ida Lupino, Dean Stockwell.
41	9	"Who Killed the Richest Man in the World?"	Gene Nelson	Stephen Kandel	November 11, 1964
When wealthy Amenor arrives in town to sell a lucrative oil lease, an apparent sniper attack on Amenor kills his bookkeeper and suspicion immediately suggests the culprit is one of three parties vying for deal. Guest stars: George Hamilton, Ricardo Montalbán, Karen Sharpe, Dick Smothers, Tom Smothers.
42	10	"Who Killed the Tall One in the Middle?"	Don Weis	Tony Barrett	November 25, 1964
The lead singer in a sister trio act is poisoned. Both the surviving sisters hated the victim, but others had motive as well: the nightclub owner, the trio's former arranger, the girls' agent, their stepfather, and a real estate agent who had been involved with two of the sisters. Tim is nearly run down by a speeding car and another suspect is murdered. Guest stars: Eduardo Ciannelli, Hal March, Diane McBain, Juliet Prowse.
43	11	"Who Killed Merlin the Great?"	Richard Kinon	Richard Levinson & William Link	December 2, 1964
Escape artist Jack Merlin, at a convention of competitive magicians, attempts his stock-in-trade trick of staying underwater for five hours sealed in coffin with an hour air supply, but he dies — from a gunshot wound. Guest stars: Nick Adams, Janet Blair, Charles Ruggles, Jill St. John.
44	12	"Who Killed 711?"	Sidney Lanfield	Gwen Bagni & Paul Dubov	December 9, 1964
When Buddy Jack Cook, a businessman with a very shady reputation, is found slain in a hotel elevator, his accountant Harold Harold is the prime suspect. Guest stars: Broderick Crawford, Rhonda Fleming, Mamie Van Doren.
45	13	"Who Killed Supersleuth?"	Lawrence Dobkin	Lorenzo Semple Jr.	December 16, 1964
Three famous private detectives, plus two famous cops from London and Moscow, are all suspects when yet another famous sleuth is murdered. Guest stars: Zsa Zsa Gabor, Thomas Gomez, J. Carrol Naish, Carl Reiner.
46	14	"Who Killed the Swinger on a Hook?"	Lewis Allen	Tony Barrett	December 23, 1964
After a developer is found stabbed to death and on a meat hook, another man is found dead with the same letter as the one discovered on the developer: a list of six names, which includes Amos. And then Amos receives such a letter. Guest stars: Gloria DeHaven, Leif Erickson, Janis Paige, Don Rickles.
47	15	"Who Killed Davidian Jonas?"	Sam Freedle	Gwen Bagni & Paul Dubov	December 30, 1964
A shipping tycoon's corpse is discovered draped over his yacht's anchor. The tycoon's intended merger would ruin several of the guests on his current cruise. A large earring is a major clue — did it belong to the victim's brother (a gypsy king), or the maharanee, or perhaps to the ship's sexy radio operator? Or was the killer the rival shipping magnate, the boozy hanger-on, or his ever-so-pleasant PR man? Guest stars: Dennis Day, Ruta Lee, Sheree North, Cesar Romero.
48	16	"Who Killed the Strangler?"	Sam Freedle	Larry Gordon	January 6, 1965
During a match a professional wrestler is killed by a poison dart that originated from a section in which only five persons sat. Guest stars: Frankie Avalon, Annette Funicello, Una Merkel, Robert Middleton.
49	17	"Who Killed Mother Goose?"	Sam Freedle	Richard Levinson & William Link	January 13, 1965
When a writer of children's books is strangled with a typewriter ribbon, the suspects are a prodigal son, a secretary, and a number of people whose livelihood involves children. Guest stars: Ann Blyth, George Hamilton, Jan Murray, Walter Pidgeon.
50	18	"Who Killed the Toy Soldier?"	Jerry Hopper	Lorenzo Semple, Jr.	January 20, 1965
Granny Grabber, the not-so-nice male head of a toy firm, is blown sky high by a bomb placed in his giant toy soldier cigar lighter. The killer had to be one of five people who were photographed coming into his office (Granny was paranoid about industrial espionage): the sultry secretary, the military adviser on war toys, an aeronautical scientist, a "James Bond" wannabe, and the head of a school for juvenile delinquents. Guest stars: Joan Caulfield, Martha Hyer, Abbe Lane, Chill Wills.
51	19	"Who Killed Rosie Sunset?"	Paul Wendkos	Tony Barrett	January 27, 1965
Why would anyone kill sweet old Rosie Sunset, who sold maps to the movie stars' homes? The suspects: an heiress seen giving Rosie a ride; Rosie's neighbor, a Russian sculptor with a sexy sister; a neurotic printer, an accordion player and Rosie's estranged stepson who needed money for his florist business. Guest stars: Eddie Albert, Hans Conried, Sheree North, Russ Tamblyn.
52	20	"Who Killed Wimbledon Hastings?"	Jerry Hopper	Leigh Chapman	February 3, 1965
An ace served by a tennis star blows up in his face after a tennis ball is loaded with explosives. Burke scours the country club for clues while trying to avoid the "help" of an eager ball boy, who claims he can solve the case. The victim's pessimistic manager, his fiancée and her jealous sister (a dentist), his ex-wife, and a tennis rival all had access to the club room and could have tampered with the equipment. Finally, a nightclub singer who knew the victim well gives Tim some valuable information. Guest stars: Edgar Bergen, Debra Paget, Gale Storm, Marie Wilson.
53	21	"Who Killed the Fat Cat?"	Jerry Hopper	Gwen Bagni & Paul Dubov	February 10, 1965
Suspicion falls on the figurehead presidents of his four corporations when shady conglomerate owner Monty Crippen dies chewing on a cyanide-laced toothpick at a costume party. Guest stars: Diana Hyland, Martha Raye, Don Rickles.
54	22	"Who Killed the Man on the White Horse?"	Allen Reisner	Berne Giler & David Giler	February 17, 1965
Cowboy star Clayton Steele is murdered at the rodeo. The suspects are many, but only one had the motive and opportunity. Guest stars: Barbara Eden, Fernando Lamas, Virginia Mayo, Telly Savalas.
55	23	"Who Killed the Thirteenth Clown?"	Jerry Hopper	Charles Hoffman	February 24, 1965
Somehow or other, thirteen circus clowns always manage to squeeze into a tiny car, and get out of it again at the end of the act. But this time, the thirteenth clown is dead. Guest stars: Betty Hutton, Terry-Thomas, Jack Weston.
56	24	"Who Killed Mr. Colby in Ladies' Lingerie?"	Jerry Hopper	Tony Barrett	March 3, 1965
With Burke in Chicago, the unit must solve the murder of a blackmailing department store maintenance man with unsavory connections past and present, and who has a penchant for the horses. Guest stars: Joan Bennett, Edd Byrnes, Arlene Dahl, Paul Lynde.
57	25	"Who Killed the Rest?"	Sam Freedle	Lorenzo Semple, Jr.	March 17, 1965
Burke's vacation south of the border is anything but restful when he is jailed for the murder of a gossip columnist and a popular local fisherman. Burke escapes from prison, but can he outwit the local police chief after all his ID has been stolen? He needs to know if the killer is the Nazi, the anthropologist turned voodoo priestess, the novelist, or the sexy sailor before the angry mob catches up with him. Guest stars: Steve Cochran, Eartha Kitt, Cesar Romero, Janice Rule.
58	26	"Who Killed Cop Robin?"	Murray Golden	David P. Harmon	March 24, 1965
A list of interconnected suspects of people that escaped justice some time ago are left to Burke after Officer Danny Robin, Burke's sponsor for the police department, is shot to death. Guest stars: Ricardo Montalbán, Susan Strasberg, James Whitmore.
59	27	"Who Killed Nobody Somehow?"	Jerry Hopper	Gwen Bagni & Paul Dubov	March 31, 1965
Novelist Graham Tree, whose smeared characters are thinly disguised, awakens on the autopsy table after a severe beating and attempted barbiturate poisoning, so Amos believes the culprit must be caught before a successful second attempt. Guest stars: Lola Albright, Rory Calhoun, Tom Ewell.
60	28	"Who Killed Hamlet?"	Don Weis	Albert Beich & Lewis Reed	April 7, 1965
A pretentious method actor is killed during a performance of Hamlet. Guest stars: John Cassavetes, Agnes Moorehead, Basil Rathbone.
61	29	"Who Killed the Rabbit's Husband?"	Jerry Hopper	Tony Barrett	April 14, 1965
When a wealthy physician is shot, his wife disappears. It seems she has a habit of running away when things get tough. Burke finds out more about her unhappy history from her sister at an amusement park, and tracks the missing woman's past through a gambling casino, a lonely hearts club, and a waterfront dive. The other men in her life (also possible suspects) include a ship's cook, a con artist "hypnotist" and an ex-jockey. Guest stars: Gloria Grahame, John Ireland, Sal Mineo.
62	30	"Who Killed the Jackpot?"	Richard Kinon	Gwen Bagni & Paul Dubov	April 21, 1965
When a wealthy banker is found murdered atop a seedy hotel's neon sign, a race to find the murderer develops between Burke and the beautiful private detective (Anne Francis as Honey West) who was working for the dead man. Guest stars: Steve Forrest, Nancy Gates, Louis Hayward, George Nader, Jan Sterling.
63	31	"Who Killed the Grand Piano?"	Frederick de Cordova	Larry Gordon	April 28, 1965
Pianist Artur Bachner's concert ends with a bang when his piano explodes. Anyone could have tampered with it during the backstage party before the concert — his abused ex-wife, a rival concert pianist, his personal manager, his horror movie star brother, or the woman he had been pursuing (now a "Bunny Mother" at a local Playboy-like club). Burke's feisty Uncle Patrick, over from Ireland for a visit, helps solve the case (while getting cozy with Burke's date). Guest stars: Ed Begley, John Cassavetes, Martha Hyer, Marilyn Maxwell, with a cameo appearance by Hugh Hefner as a Bunny Club Manager.
64	32	"Who Killed the Card?"	Jerry Hopper	Gwen Bagni & Paul Dubov	May 5, 1965
The head of a greeting card firm has been killed, but not by the arrow protruding from his body. It was slow, methodical arsenic poisoning. His flirtatious teenage assistant takes a shine to Burke, but she might be a suspect. If not, there are others: the victim's ambitious successor, the mousy psychologist and his domineering wife, or the jingle writer. The season ends with the cast of regulars involved in a big musical production number. Guest stars: Eddie Bracken, Wally Cox, Les Crane, Jill Haworth.

=== Season 3 (1965–66) ===
No. overall	No. in season	Title	Directed by	Written by	Original release date
65	1	"Balance of Terror"	Murray Golden	Robert Buckner	September 15, 1965
Burke turns in his police badge to work as a secret agent for the federal government. In his first assignment, he travels to Switzerland to work with the local police to crack an international ring of gold smugglers; Red Chinese gold is being smuggled from Switzerland into Latin America. The leader of the smugglers is General Edrego Barata, once a Latin American dictator who stripped his country of its wealth. Burke poses as syndicate hit man Paul Schreiner, whom Barata has never met. The plan goes awry when the real Schreiner is released from jail and exposes Burke. Guest stars: Michele Carey, Gerald Mohr.
66	2	"Operation Long Shadow"	Don Taylor	Albert Beich & William H. Wright	September 22, 1965
In a combination of The Day of the Jackal and The Man Who Knew Too Much, Burke is sent to Paris to locate the missing son of an American diplomat. The boy disappeared shortly after someone murdered his father's girlfriend by pushing her off the Eiffel Tower. When Burke arrives, he finds himself involved in a bizarre plot to assassinate Charles de Gaulle that takes him across the French countryside. Guest stars: Antoinette Bower, Rosemary DeCamp.
67	3	"Steam Heat"	Virgil W. Vogel	Marc Brandell	September 29, 1965
Burke poses as a jewel thief and infiltrates a criminal syndicate planning to put New York City to sleep with gas introduced into all the steam mains. The crooks — Albert Indigo, Tucson the Cowboy, Charlie "The Arm" Segal, and Ziggy White — then plan to loot the entire city. With the finances for the plan supplied by foreign interests, the syndicate also intends to kill a few important, connected people. While planning takes place at the Villa Ruposa, "Mr. I" undergoes a senate hearing, after which he vows vengeance on Senator Burrows. With the aid of co-spy Ursula Prince, Burke learns about the entire operation, but a beautiful crook named Silkie kills Ursula so she can have Burke all to herself. Guest stars: Kipp Hamilton, Nehemiah Persoff.
68	4	"Password to Death"	Seymour Robbie	Marc Brandell	October 6, 1965
In London, Burke investigates two murders. The victims, a German electronics expert and a Yugoslavian engineer, had one thing in common: they both died after telephoning a certain number. Burke uncovers an intricate plot involving a password that means instant death, tin mines that have poison gas in the ventilating system, and a new, deadly Soviet satellite. Behind it all is megalomaniac who plans to destroy all the top people in England and take over the nation. Guest stars: Martin Kosleck, Janette Scott.
69	5	"The Man with the Power"	Murray Golden	Stuart Jerome	October 13, 1965
Burke is sent behind the Iron Curtain and must smuggle out a famous scientist who has developed an ultra-powerful nuclear device. Another agent, Tony Scott, is assigned to assist Burke, but is actually in a conspiracy to steal the new weapon and sell it. Once they get Dr. Crystal into Austria, Scott kidnaps him and hooks him up to his bomb, which will destroy Vienna within 22 hours if two million dollars in uncut diamonds aren't paid. Burke gets the diamonds released to an Austrian official. However, he too is in on the plot. Claiming the diamonds are fake, the official accuses Burke of stealing the real gems, planning to blame the inevitable disaster on Burke and then kill him. Guest stars: John Abbott, Thomas Gomez.
70	6	"Nightmare in the Sun"	James Goldstone	Tony Barrett	October 20, 1965
Burke is in Mexico City to try to learn who is behind an assassination attempt against Pablo Vasquez, the Mexican Government's Labor Leader, who very pro-U.S. He discovers that a proposed peace treaty is the reason behind the attempt on Vasquez while he was watching the renowned female matador, La Tigra. Burke gets himself thrown in jail in order to question a suspected conspirator, but learns nothing. La Tigra distracts Burke while he is guarding Vasquez and Vasquez is kidnapped. Failing to kill Burke, La Tigra confesses that she was only in on the plot because she was being blackmailed by Darvas, the leader of the plot. Guest stars: Edward Asner, Mari Blanchard.
71	7	"The Prisoners of Mr. Sin"	John Peyser	Marc Brandell & Gilbert Ralston	October 27, 1965
Special Installation MX-3 in Washington, D.C., is protecting a renowned cryptographer and head clerk of a U.S. intelligence installation, Dr. Waldo E. Bannister, responsible for breaking the Manchurian Code. With his knowledge, expertise, and photographic memory, he is highly sought after. Deep in his brain are the files of twenty-one of the country's best agents, including Burke. In retirement, Bannister travels to the Isle of Tio Moro, a thieves' market where the most unusual items regularly change hands and the home of the notorious Mr. Sin. Planning on selling his information, Bannister is instead captured by Mr. Sin, who plans to auction off Bannister's facts to the highest bidder, keeping the money for himself. Burke is sent to either retrieve Bannister or kill him before he talks. Posing as a playboy who operates on the fringes of the law, Burke gains the confidence of Mr. Sin and plans to bid on Bannister. Guest stars: Michael Dunn, France Nuyen.
72	8	"Peace, It's a Gasser"	James Goldstone	Palmer Thompson	November 3, 1965
Union Seecorps, a fanatical revolutionary group led by Harrison Quentin Filmore, has a dream. Filmore wants to bring peace to the world through Operation Euphoria. He plans to dose Washington, D.C., with LSD gas for three days. First they must steal H09, a gasoline additive, from Narvoo Air Base, in order to drug the troops. Burke is sent to the base and poses as a member of the military police to guard the H09. Filmore, however, manages to drug the entire base and steal the additive. Others from the Union plan to take advantage of Filmore's "high" ideas of peace and take over the United States Government. Burke poses as a traitor in order to infiltrate the Union, but Filmore decides to test his "disloyalty" by ordering him to kill a CIA agent. Guest stars: Brooke Bundy, Deanna Lund.
73	9	"The Weapon"	James Goldstone	Tony Barrett	November 10, 1965
Burke heads to London to battle power-crazed tycoon Alexander Szabo, a maniac who possesses a deadly truth serum. Szabo uses the serum on top government officials who, after revealing secret information, are then caused to commit suicide by the drug's effects. Guest stars: Dyan Cannon, Bernard Fox.
74	10	"Deadlier Than the Male"	John Peyser	Albert Beich & William H. Wright	November 17, 1965
Exiled South American dictator Pedro Cabrial is living in a Spanish castle, but aspires to return to power with the help of foreign financial aid. Carla, his wife, conceals from him the fact that he has contracted a fatal illness and will be dead in thirty days; in this way, she figures he will go through with a planned coup, and then she will be able to gain control of the country. Jeff Smith (an undercover agent who happens to be son of Burke's boss), Dr. Torres, and anyone else who gets in the way of the military takeover are killed. Burke is sent to infiltrate Cabrial's stronghold. He succeeds in getting inside the castle, only to be captured and put on a rack left over from the Inquisition. Guest stars: Julie Adams, Lisa Gaye.
75	11	"Whatever Happened to Adriana, and Why Won't She Stay Dead?"	Seymour Robbie	Warren B. Duff	December 1, 1965
A warehouse explosion destroys evidence needed to convict international narcotics king James Gunnar Ketterbach. His new line of business is smuggling missiles into South America; Burke's mission is to capture one of the missiles and bring it back to be used in evidence at the United Nations inquest. Ketterbach has disposed of a woman for a top Sicilian official and put her in a coffin marked "Adriana Montavi." Since then, he has been blackmailing the official into helping him with his operation. Adriana, however, is very much alive. Guest stars: Jocelyn Lane, Albert Paulsen.
76	12	"The Man's Men"	Jerry Hopper	Albert Beich & William H. Wright	December 8, 1965
The title refers to the operatives of Burke's boss, "The Man." The Man has devised an ambitious project entitled Operation Eyeball, a plan to bug every foreign embassy in the world. Shortly before the plan is to be put into effect, a microfilm containing a list of American agents assigned to the operation is stolen, along with a photograph of each one. The list is being offered in trade for seven million in diamonds for international bidding on future targets. Even though the ransom is paid, The Man knows the list has been copied and so orders Burke and female agent Sylvia Kellogg to kill everyone connected with the theft. As they carry out the mission, Burke begins to suspect that Sylvia is working for the other side. Guest stars: Nancy Gates, Carl Benton Reid.
77	13	"Or No Tomorrow"	Virgil W. Vogel	John Hawkins & Ward Hawkins	December 15, 1965
The Man sends Burke to Ceylon to investigate a ransom note that the U.S. government has received. The note threatened to unleash a deadly new fungus called Blast on the Asian continent unless a pair of convicted spies were released to the extortionist. After the fungus is released on the small island of Perzan in the Indian Ocean, the rice crops become diseased and have to be burned and destroyed after only 48 hours. Unless Burke can find a way to stop whoever is behind the plan, the entire world may be faced with a great famine. Burke learns that the person behind the plot is the mad Prince Ransputa, and he poses as a wealthy American in search of rare emeralds in order to get to the prince. Once inside the palace, he discovers that the fungus was unwittingly created by a beautiful scientist, Tashu Anil, who is in love with the prince and is being used by him. Guest stars: Abbe Lane, Ziva Rodann.
78	14	"A Little Gift for Cairo"	Jerry Hopper	Tony Barrett & Ben Starr	December 22, 1965
Sheik Farid, deposed King of Egypt, is collecting a secret arsenal of weapons to take over what he has lost. The Man assigns Burke to foil Farid's takeover plans. To help him, he has an elderly but effective British agent named Agatha Carruthers. Burke plans to romance Farid's mistress, Yasmin, and plant a bug in a fake diamond pendant he plans to give her. Guest stars: Jeanette Nolan, Pat Quinn.
79	15	"A Very Important Russian Is Missing"	Virgil W. Vogel	Tony Barrett & Samuel A. Peeples	December 29, 1965
The United States and Russia collaborate on finding a Soviet agent, Borodin, feared kidnapped by China. Both the U.S. and U.S.S.R. worry that the Red Chinese will extract the many military secrets he carries in his head. A top Soviet agent, Pavlov, is sent to assist Burke in locating the missing Borodin. They learn that Borodin has been smuggled into Switzerland in the carcass of a dead ox, and is being held in a state of suspended animation. Deceptions lead Burke to finally discover that Russians are actually holding Borodin for a ransom of four million dollars. Guest stars: Parley Baer, Phyllis Newman.
80	16	"Terror in a Tiny Town: Part 1"	Murray Golden	Marc Brandell	January 5, 1966
Harlan O'Brien, Chief Security Officer at the nuclear power plant in the small town of Sorrel, is shot by a policeman after going berserk in a restaurant. After his death, Burke goes to investigate the death of his old war buddy and finds the townspeople all seem to be under some form of mass hypnosis. Expressionless, they refuse to discuss anything but their great loyalty to their town. Burke tries to uncover the truth about an organization known as The Friends of Progress. The town leader, ex-Congressman Jed Hawkes, seems sane enough until he suddenly orders the citizens to kill Burke. A mob forms and they finally corner Burke in a laundromat. Five of the seemingly "normal" people enter with shotguns and come after Burke... Guest stars: Lynn Loring, Kevin McCarthy.
81	17	"Terror in a Tiny Town: Part 2"	Murray Golden	Marc Brandell	January 12, 1966
Escaping, Amos goes to see The Man and learns that he is wanted for murder. He returns to Sorrel and finds the secret that Harlan O'Brien knew: the town has been brainwashed by subliminal tapes broadcast from station KJHS. Hawkes is behind the entire scheme — he has stolen an atom bomb from the plant, piece by piece, and hidden it inside a statue in Washington, D.C. Burke allows himself to be arrested, then manages to get the zombie-like citizens to turn on Hawkes. The bomb squad finds the stolen atom bomb and successfully defuses it. Guest stars: Skip Homeier, Patricia Owens.
