= Jess-Belle =

- The Twilight Zone episode
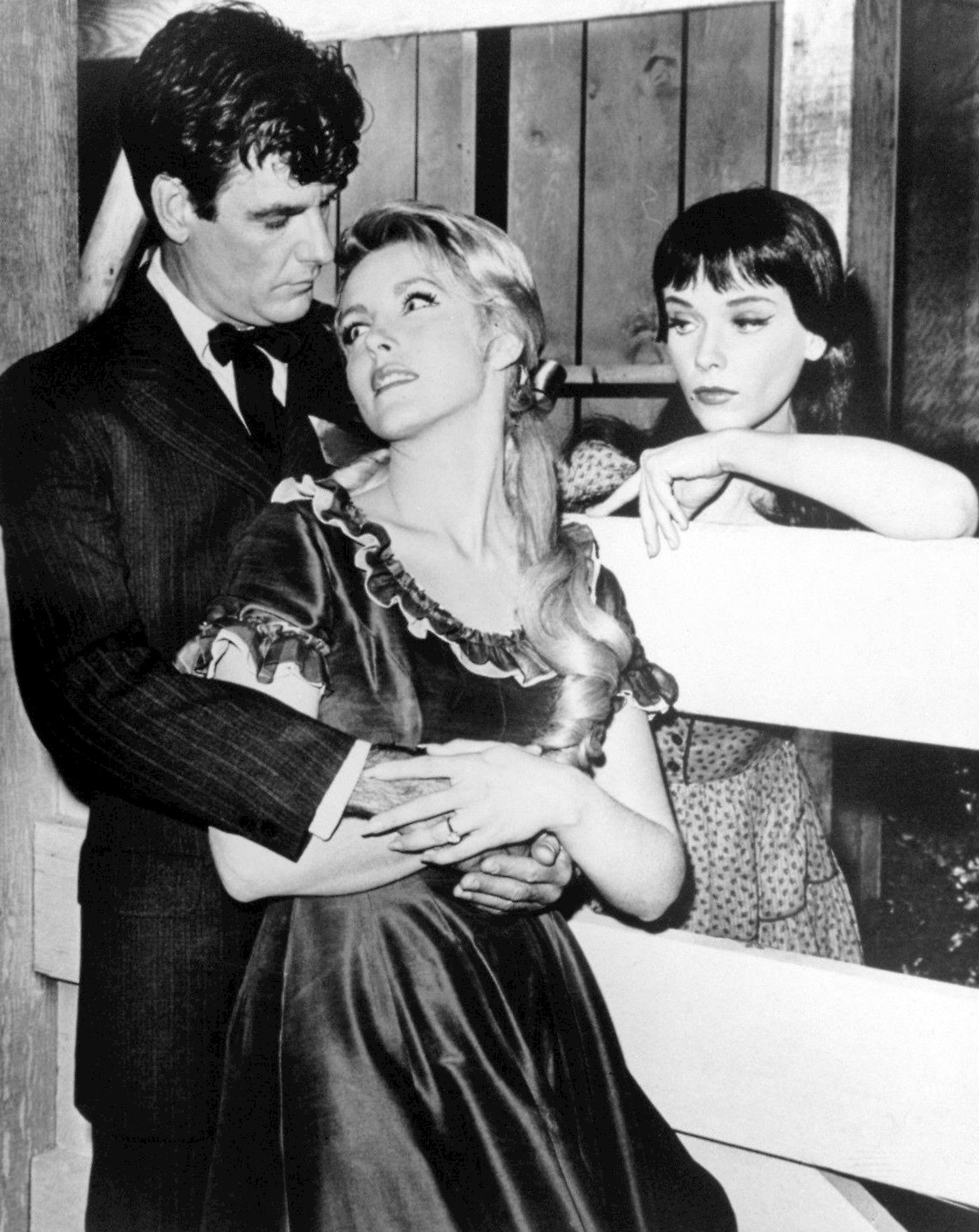
- L-R: James Best, Laura Devon, and Anne Francis in "Jess-Belle"
- Episode no.: Season 4 Episode 7
- Directed by: Buzz Kulik
- Written by: Earl Hamner, Jr.
- Production code: 4855
- Original air date: February 14, 1963

Guest appearances
- Anne Francis; James Best; Laura Devon; Jeanette Nolan; Virginia Gregg; Jon Lormer; George Mitchell; Helen Kleeb; Jim Boles

Episode chronology
← Previous "Death Ship"	Next → "Miniature"
- The Twilight Zone (1959 TV series) (season 4)

"Jess-Belle" is an episode of the American television science fiction and fantasy anthology series The Twilight Zone. In this episode, a young woman, whose name sounds like "Jezebel", spurned by the man she loves, becomes a witch in order to make him love her.

This is the only episode of The Twilight Zone in the Rod Serling incarnation with no closing narration.

== Opening narration ==
The Twilight Zone has existed in many lands in many times. It has its roots in history, in something that happened long, long ago and got told about and handed down from one generation of folk to the other. In the telling the story gets added to and embroidered on, so that what might have happened in the time of the Druids is told as if it took place yesterday in the Blue Ridge Mountains. Such stories are best told by an elderly grandfather on a cold winter's night by the fireside in the southern hills of the Twilight Zone.

== Plot ==
Jess-Belle, determined that ex-boyfriend Billy-Ben Turner and his fiancee Ellwyn Glover not marry, enlists the aid of local witch Granny Hart. Granny casts a spell that makes Billy-Ben forget Ellwyn and fall madly in love with Jess-Belle. There is a price for the spell: Jess-Belle will transform into a leopard from midnight until dawn. Jess-Belle also feels herself growing colder and more heartless with each transformation. The witch explains that Jess-Belle's soul has been extinguished, and she has been transformed into a witch herself.

Horrified by her waning humanity, Jess-Belle considers running away from Billy-Ben. His devotion to her remains unwavering, and she finds herself unable to give up her selfish desire. They arrange to be married. A hunting party including Billy-Ben finds the leopard and shoots it, and it disappears in a cloud of smoke. Billy-Ben finds Jess-Belle's ring on the ground where the leopard had stood.

A year later, Billy-Ben marries Ellwyn. Jess-Belle reappears in various threatening forms. Billy-Ben learns from Granny that to kill Jess-Belle, he must make a figure of her using clothing she has worn and stab it through the heart with silver. He returns home to find Ellwyn has been possessed by Jess-Belle. Jess-Belle then asks Billy-Ben to "dance in the moonlight", which means she wants to kill him. He runs into the house and locks the door. He puts one of Jess-Belle's dresses on a mannequin and stabs it with one of Jess-Belle's own silver hairpins. Jess-Belle appears in the dress, her eyes roll back, and she disappears. After this, Ellwyn does not remember anything that happened since the wedding, but claims, upon seeing a falling star that "it means a witch has died."

== Closing narration ==
The episode did not feature a closing narration from Rod Serling. Instead, it ends with the folk song heard at the beginning:

Fair was Elly Glover,
Dark was Jess-Belle.
Both they loved the same man
And both they loved him well.

== Production ==
This story, set in the Blue Ridge Mountains, was penned by Earl Hamner, Jr., who also wrote Spencer's Mountain and was the creator and narrator of The Waltons. He also wrote the Twilight Zone episode entitled The Hunt in season 3.

Hamner told Twilight Zone historian Marc Zicree that this was his personal favorite of the eight Twilight Zone episodes he wrote. It was written at very short notice (at the request of producer Herbert Hirschmann) after another script scheduled for production fell through. After being approached by Hirschmann on a Friday, Hamner developed the story over the weekend and pitched it the following Monday. It was accepted, and Hamner then wrote an act each day, delivering the finished script on the following Friday. Hamner also recalled that there was no time for any revision because the episode had to be shot right away.

Hamner stated that Jess-Belle's original animal incarnation in the script was a tiger, but Herbert Hirschmann told him at the time that the tigers provided by animal trainers were too hard to work with. Hamner recalled Hirschmann phoning him and complaining, "I'm up to my ass in tigers and none of them can act!", so it was changed to a leopard. The original intention was to have a black leopard (to match Jess-Belle's black hair) but none were available, so Hirschmann had to settle on a spotted leopard. Director Buzz Kulik, who also nominated this as one of his two favourite Twilight Zone episodes, recalled that the leopard also proved very difficult, partly because it had been drugged; and that despite the extensive precautions taken, including the construction of a camera cage, it proved extremely hard to get the leopard to do anything at all, and that it tended to fall asleep during shooting.

The episode also features Virginia Gregg, who featured in Spencer's Mountain; Helen Kleeb, who played the role of Miss Mamie Baldwin in The Waltons; and Jeanette Nolan, who played Rachel in The Hunt.

This is the only episode of the original series with no closing voiceover from Rod Serling, although he does provide an introduction as usual.

As with many other Twilight Zone episodes, there is a link to MGM's Forbidden Planet (1956); in this case it is the presence of the film's co-star Anne Francis (who also starred in The After Hours).

== Influences ==
JP at The Twilight Zone Vortex observes, "Hamner was likely ... familiar, at least as a casual reader, with classic and contemporary supernatural fiction, a field in which tales of transformation and witchcraft abound. Some relevant examples include Ambrose Bierce’s 'The Eyes of the Panther' (1897) in which a man marries into a family of feline shape-shifters. ... 'Ancient Sorceries' (1908) by Algernon Blackwood (a writer later adapted for Rod Serling’s Night Gallery) concerns a traveler who spends a terrible night in a French town whose residents transform into cats after nightfall. It was loosely filmed by director Jacques Tourneur in 1942 as Cat People. The rise of fiction magazines saw such stories as Sax Rohmer’s 'In the Valley of the Sorceress' (1916), which uses a witch from ancient Egypt and the familiar black cat to achieve its effects. The American pulp fiction tradition was typically represented by such tales as 'The Leopard Woman' by Edith Ross (1929), tales in which females either transform into large cats or are protected by such beasts from meddling males."

== Cast ==
- Anne Francis as Jess-Belle
- James Best as Billy-Ben Turner
- Laura Devon as Ellwyn Glover
- Jeanette Nolan as Granny Hart
- Virginia Gregg as Ossie
- Jon Lormer as Minister
- George Mitchell as Luther Glover
- Helen Kleeb as Mattie Glover
- Jim Boles as Obed Miller
