= Synanon (film) =

1965 film by Richard Quine

- Directed by: Richard Quine
- Screenplay by: Ian Bernard; S Lee Pogostin
- Story by: Barry Oringer; S Lee Pogostin
- Produced by: Richard Quine
- Starring: Edmond O'Brien; Chuck Connors; Stella Stevens; Alex Cord; Richard Conte; Eartha Kitt
- Cinematography: Harry Stradling, Jr.
- Edited by: David Wages
- Music by: Neal Hefti
- Production company: Richard Quine Productions
- Distributed by: Columbia Pictures
- Release date: May 5, 1965 (New York City)
- Running time: 105 minutes
- Country: United States
- Language: English
- Box office: $1,000,000

Synanon (a.k.a. Get Off My Back!) is a 1965 American drama film directed by Richard Quine and starring Chuck Connors, Stella Stevens, Alex Cord, Richard Conte, Eartha Kitt and Edmond O'Brien. It featured a screenplay by Ian Bernard and was filmed at Synanon in Santa Monica, California.

== Plot ==
Hooked on heroin, Zankie Albo is admitted to Synanon House, a rehabilitation center. Chuck Dederich, a recovering alcoholic, is in charge.

Zankie is placed in the care of Joaney during his early, painful stages of drug withdrawal. She, too, is a rehabbing junkie, and any further mistake on her part could permanently cost her custody of her child.

An attraction develops between Zankie and Joaney, resulting in jealousy from another man interested in her, Ben, a parolee and "graduate" of the center. Ben reports them to the center's officials after catching Zankie and Joaney in a romantic tryst. A patient who manages to get high on cough medicine is persuaded by Zankie to share it, leading to a tragic end.

Zankie, while in a seedy motel room with Joaney, shoots up heroin, which unbeknownst to him is bad. As he experiences a reaction to the drug, Joaney watches in horror; seconds later, Zankie is dead from the overdose.

== Cast ==
- Chuck Connors as Ben
- Stella Stevens as Joaney Adamic
- Alex Cord as Zankie Albo
- Richard Conte as Reid Kimble
- Eartha Kitt as Betty Kimble
- Edmond O'Brien as Chuck Dederich
- BarBara Luna as Mary (as Barbara Luna)
- Alejandro Rey as Chris
- Richard Evans as Hopper
- Gregory Morton as Vince
- Chanin Hale as Arline
- K.C. Townsend as Pruddy (as Carsey Townsend)
- Larry Kert as Bob Adamic
- Bernie Hamilton as Pete
- Solomom Sturges as Joe Mann (as Mark Sturges)
- Lawrence Montaigne as The Greek
- Patricia Huston as Carla
- Arnold Ross as Pianist – Resident at Synanon House
- John Peterson as Pianist – Resident at Synanon House
- James Middleton as Pianist – Resident at Synanon House
- Anthony Daddio as Pianist – Resident at Synanon House
- Candy Latson as Pianist – Resident at Synanon House
- Dan Spaccarelli as Pianist – Resident at Synanon House
- Herb Rosen as Pianist – Resident at Synanon House
- William Crawford as Pianist – Resident at Synanon House
- Charles Haden as Pianist – Resident at Synanon House
- Matthew Notkins as Pianist – Resident at Synanon House
- Peter Bernard as Timmy Adamic – Joanie’s son

== Reception ==
A. H. Weiler of The New York Times was positive: "Richard Quine, who produced and directed this new arrival ... has glaringly spotlighted residents of this West Coast haven for the dope and alcohol enslaved, with results that are arresting and informative. ... Mr. Quine and his troupe achieved authenticity and a documentary quality simply by filming their story at the actual Synanon House on the beach at Santa Monica, Calif."
