= Chanin Hale =

American actress (1928–2020)

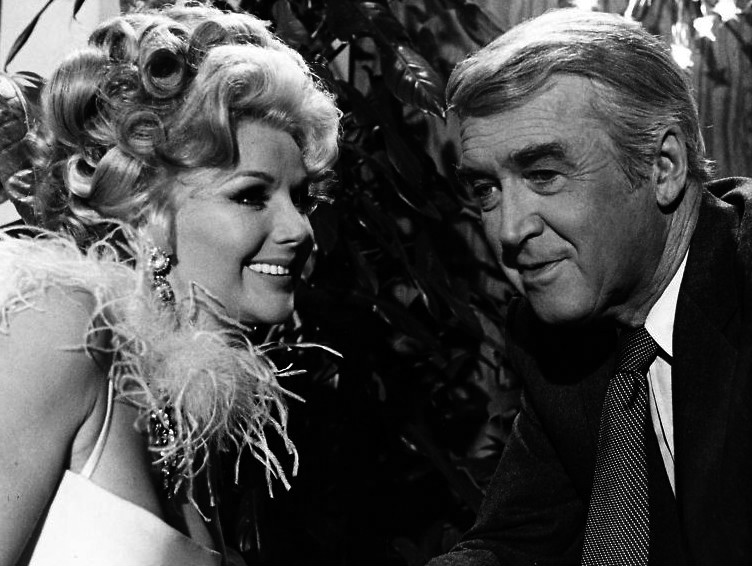
- Chanin Hale in The Jimmy Stewart Show, 1972.
- Born: Marilyn Victoria Chanine Hale Haney; October 3, 1928; Dayton, Ohio, U.S.A.
- Died: January 30, 2020 (aged 91); Los Angeles, California, U.S.A.
- Occupation: Actress
- Years active: 1955–1981
- Spouse: Richard Bradshaw

Chanin Hale, married name Chanin Hale Bradshaw (October 3, 1928 – 30 January 2020), was an American actress on stage, film, and television, perhaps best known for more than forty appearances on The Red Skelton Hour.

== Early life ==
Chanin Hale was born Marilyn Victoria Chanine Hale Haney in Dayton, Ohio. As a creative, athletic girl, she won art awards and excelled in sports. Being "bit" by the performing bug in school, Hale pursued acting and acquired roles in student and community theater, taking lessons in dancing and singing. She dyed her red hair platinum blonde, and joined the Dayton Y Players, learning Greek tragedy and low comedy. She attained some success in the title role of Annie Get Your Gun, which helped to land a role in Little Mary Sunshine, playing a flirtatious character named Twinkle. Hale took to her mother's family name, retaining it into her professional career.

== Career ==
Hale moved to New York in 1955 and became a stage actress. She toured with the revue "High Time" performing in plays such as Bus Stop (1955), The Gazebo (1958) with William Bendix, Little Mary Sunshine (1959), and Come Blow Your Horn (1961).

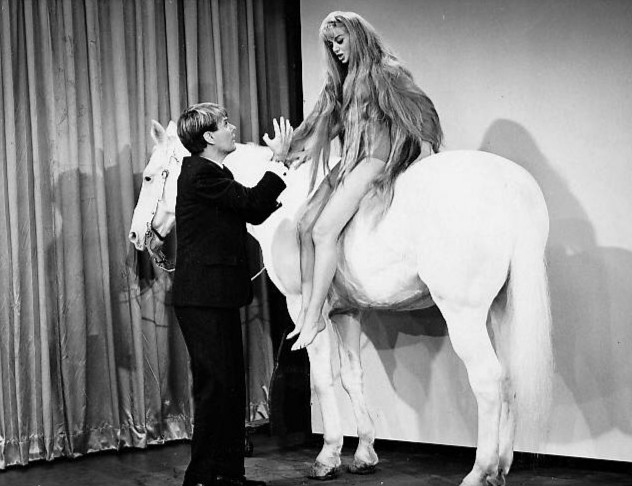
Hale as Lady Godiva, with Will Hutchins in Hey, Landlord, 1966

Hale began in television as secretaries, corpses, and other "bit" roles. In a 1963 UCLA comedy production, she met Jack Albertson who introduced her to Red Skelton. With excellent pantomime skills, Hale appeared regularly on the show. Her other television appearances include roles on Adam-12, The Beverly Hillbillies, Bonanza, The Danny Kaye Show, Death Valley Days, The Dick Van Dyke Show, The Donna Reed Show, Dragnet (she was one of several "stable" actors that Jack Webb used in recurring roles on his shows), Gomer Pyle, U.S.M.C., Green Acres, Hey, Landlord, Hondo, The Jimmy Stewart Show, and Gunsmoke, among others.

Film appearances include Synanon (1965), A Guide for the Married Man (1967), Gunn (1967), The Wicked Dreams of Paula Schultz (1968), Will Penny (1968), and The Night They Raided Minsky's (1968).

Hale was also a regular supporter of, and toured with, the USO, to Vietnam and other overseas locations, well into the late 1960s. Subsequently, Hale was one of the last successful pinup models. Early in 1969, she was a favorite with the soldiers; thousands of 8x10s were printed and mailed after her photo was published by the New York Daily News posing as Eve in a homemade costume.

== Personal life ==
Hale was married to Richard Bradshaw in 1986 until her death nearly 34 years later. She died at the age of 91.

== Filmography ==
=== Film ===
- 1965: Synanon aka Get Off My Back – Arline
- 1967: A Guide for the Married Man – Miss Crenshaw
- 1967: Gunn – Scarlotti's Mistress
- 1968: Will Penny – Girl
- 1968: The Wicked Dreams of Paula Schultz – Hilda
- 1968: The Night They Raided Minsky's – Valerie

=== Television ===
Chanin Hale television credits
Year	Title	Role	Notes	Ref.
1963-1971	The Red Skelton Hour	(various)	Regular cast	
1965	The Beverly Hillbillies	Linda Curry	Episode: "Luke's Boy"	
1965	The Donna Reed Show	Myrtle	Episode: "How to Handle a Woman"	
1965	Gomer Pyle, U.S.M.C.	Hostess	Episode: "Double Date with the Sarge"	
1968	Gomer Pyle, U.S.M.C.	Gloria	Episode: "A Star Is Not Born"	
1965	The Legend of Jesse James	Marie	Episode: "The Quest"	
1966	The Dick Van Dyke Show	Sugar Henderson	Episode: "Bad Reception in Albany"	
1966	The Double Life of Henry Phyfe	Pretty Blonde	Episode: "Phyfe and the Code Book: Part 2"	
1966	My Favorite Martian	Sales Girl	Episode: "Martin, the Mannequin"	
1966	Hey, Landlord	Lady Godiva	Episode: "Pursuit of a Dream"	
1966	The Wild Wild West	Flo	Episode: "The Night of the Whirring Death"	
1967	Death Valley Days	Flora	Episode: "Shanghai Kelly's Birthday Party"	
1967	The F.B.I.	Bobbie	Episode: "Rope of Gold"	
1967	Hondo	Carrot Top	Episode: "Hondo and the Gladiators"	
1968	Blondie	Mrs. Hathaway	Episode: "Dagwood the Wheeler Dealer"	
1969	Dragnet	Helen Zimmerman	Episode: "Frauds (DR-36)"	
1969	Dragnet	Dottie Taylor	Episode: "Vice (DR-30)"	
1969	I Dream of Jeannie	Girl at the Party	Episode: "Jeannie and the Bachelor Party"	
1969	In Name Only	Barbara	Television film	
1969	Bonanza	Laura Mae Mears	Episode: "Mrs. Wharton and the Lesser Breeds"	
1970	Bonanza	Lily	Episode: "The Trouble with Trouble"	
1969	Green Acres	Post Office Clerk	Episode: "The Special Delivery Letter"	
1969	Green Acres	Girl	Episode: "Beauty Is Skin Deep"	
1970	Green Acres	Blanche Foster	Episode: "Oliver's Double"	
1970	Howdy	Unknown	Television film	
1971	Gunsmoke	Verna	Episode: "Lavery" (S16.E22)	
1972	Gunsmoke	Apple Pie Lady	Episode: "The River: Part 1" (S18.E1)	
1972	The Jimmy Stewart Show	Candy Jar	Episode: "Song of the Jailbird"	
1972	The Jimmy Stewart Show	Lala Brodu	Episode: "Jim's Decision"	
1972	Adam-12	Irma Baker	Episode: "Lost and Found"	
1973	Gunsmoke	Sally	Episode: "Talbot" (S18.E23)	
1973	The Mary Tyler Moore Show	Waitress	Episode: "Hi There, Sports Fans"	
1974	Adam-12	Helen Dugan	Episode: "North Hollywood Division"	
1975	Gunsmoke	Woman	Episode: "The Sharecroppers" (S2.E24)	
1976	Laverne & Shirley	Nurse	Episode: "Angels of Mercy"	
1976	Marcus Welby, M.D.	Lois	Episode: "How Do You Know What Hurts Me?"	
1976	Mobile One	Carol North	Episode: "Libel"	
1976	Police Woman	Adoption Clerk	Episode: "Mother Love"	
1977	Chico and the Man	Episode: "Uncle Sonny"	Annalou Brown	
1977	The Love Boat	Claire	Episode: "Lonely at the Top / Silent Night / Divorce Me, Please"	
1977	Welcome Back, Kotter	Orshack's Secretary	Episode: "There Goes Number 5"	
1981	No Man's Valley	Nipponia (voice)	Animated special	
