= Chamber of Horrors (1966 film) =

1966 film by Hy Averback

- Film poster
- Directed by: Hy Averback
- Screenplay by: Stephen Kandel
- Story by: Ray Russell; Stephen Kandel
- Produced by: Hy Averback
- Starring: Patrick O'Neal; Cesare Danova; Wilfrid Hyde-White; Laura Devon; Patrice Wymore
- Narrated by: William Conrad
- Cinematography: Richard H. Kline
- Edited by: David Wages
- Music by: William Lava
- Distributed by: Warner Bros. Pictures
- Release date: October 28, 1966
- Running time: 99 minutes
- Country: United States
- Language: English

Chamber of Horrors is a 1966 American psychological horror film directed by Hy Averback and starring Patrick O'Neal, Cesare Danova, Wilfrid Hyde-White, Wayne Rogers and Laura Devon. The screenplay is by Stephen Kandel, from a story by Kandel and Ray Russell.

The film was released to theatres but was originally shot as a television movie and a pilot film for a proposed series called House of Wax. It was released theatrically because it was considered too intense for television at the time.

The film used the gimmicks of the Fear Flasher (the screen flashing red for several seconds) and the Horror Horn (an audible alert) to alert viewers to grisly moments. The gimmicks were added (including a cameo appearance by Tony Curtis) to increase the running time. There are plot similarities between this and Dark Intruder, which was released the previous year.

The film is narrated by William Conrad.

== Plot ==
Anthony Draco (Danova) and Harold Blount (Hyde-White) are proprietors of a wax museum in Baltimore who are also amateur sleuths. They are drawn into the investigation of Jason Cravette (O'Neal), an insane murderer who kills a woman and then "marries" her. They help the police capture him, and he is convicted of murder and sentenced to hang. He escapes while being transported by chopping off his own hand. Presumed dead by the police, Cravette flees to New Orleans. With a hook in place of his severed hand, and under an assumed name, he plots vengeance on all who "betrayed" him.

As part of his plan, he takes the prostitute Marie Champlain in his charge, turning her into a "lady" and returning with her to Baltimore. There he sets Marie on a mission to seduce the judge who condemned him in order to trap and murder him. After killing the judge, he chops off the judge's arms and head, obscuring his identity.

Draco and Blount discover the crime scene and realize the judge has been murdered, and that the murderer toasted the crime with champagne after butchering him. With only the report of a mysterious blonde as a clue, Draco and Blount seek out one of the judge's friends who reveals the judge's sordid fondness for women, as well as the name "Marie" of his latest dalliance.

After tracking Marie to her home address, Draco calls on her. Using the missing judge as a reference, Draco asks Marie to pose for him in order to make a wax model of her. Overhearing Draco's offer, Cravette encourages Marie to accept the offer, as well as Draco's subsequent proposal for an evening on the town.

While Draco is distracted with Marie, Cravette kidnaps Dr. Cobb, who had testified at Cravette's trial, murdering him and also severing his hands, which he sends to the police with a cryptic note.

Draco and Blount conclude that the mysterious murderer is delivering a corpse of a man to the police piece-by-piece, with the arms and head still missing. When Draco accidentally surprises Marie with a wax dummy of the dead judge, she realizes her role in the murders and tells them the story of the man with the severed hand she met in New Orleans. Confronted with a wax dummy of Cravette, Marie tells them that he is the man she met in New Orleans.

Now realizing that they are up against a man they thought dead, and that he is no doubt seeking to kill the rest of his enemies as a way of finishing the "body", Draco, Blount, and the police set up a dragnet for the escaped murderer.

Cravette is apparently apprehended by one of the patrolmen (Rogers) who originally arrested him. But Cravette kills him with a pistol concealed in a mock hand over his prosthetic hook, and sends his arms to the police.

Draco, knowing that he is intended to be the "head" of Cravette's assembled revenge corpse, concludes that Cravette will come for him in his wax museum. Remaining inside his museum all night with Marie and Blount, and with the police protecting the building, Draco awaits the arrival of his deadly nemesis.

Cravette evades the police stakeout by sneaking into the building through the roof. After distracting and knocking out Draco's companions one by one, Cravette confronts Draco, telling him he wants his head. After a struggle using antique weapons, Cravette is impaled in ghastly fashion on his own wax image.

In the concluding scene, it is revealed that Marie was given a light sentence of two years. Draco and Blount then notice that the female wax dummy in their exhibit of an iron maiden is "too real". Realizing that she is an actual murder victim, they call for the police.

== Cast ==
- Patrick O'Neal: Jason Cravette/Jason Caroll
- Cesare Danova: Anthony Draco
- Wilfrid Hyde-White: Harold Blount
- Laura Devon: Marie Champlain
- Patrice Wymore: Vivian
- Suzy Parker: Barbara Dixon
- José René Ruiz Martínez (credited as Tun Tun): Senor Pepe De Reyes
- Philip Bourneuf: Insp. Matthew Strudwick
- Jeanette Nolan: Mrs. Ewing Perryman
- Marie Windsor: Madame Corona
- Wayne Rogers: Police Sgt. Jim Albertson
- Vinton Hayworth: Judge Walter Randolph
- Richard O'Brien: Dr. Romulus Cobb
- Inger Stratton: Gloria
- Berry Kroeger: Chun Sing
- Tony Curtis: Mr. Julian (uncredited)
- Lyle Latell as Trainman (uncredited)

== Home media ==
Chamber of Horrors was released on DVD by Warner Home Video in September 2008 with a co-feature, The Brides of Fu Manchu.

== See also ==
- List of American films of 1966
