= Let's Talk Hollywood =

American radio quiz and panel discussion series (1948)

Let's Talk Hollywood is a radio quiz and panel discussion program that was broadcast on NBC from July 4 to September 26, 1948, as a summer replacement for The Jack Benny Program.

== Format ==
George Murphy was the host of the show, which featured a panel that answered listener-submitted questions about films and stars. Eddie Bracken appeared weekly on the panel, with Edith Gwynn and Erskine Johnson alternating weeks. The rest of the panel varied from week to week, with stars, technicians, and other people in the film industry participating. Guest panelists included Dore Schary, Jane Wyman, Dorothy Lamour, Jerry Wald, Van Johnson and Ida Lupino.

Each listener whose question was used received a subscription to Photoplay magazine. A question that stumped the panel resulted in a one-year pass with free admission to the listener's favorite theater.

== Production ==
Amusement Enterprises Inc. produced Let's Talk Hollywood. Hilliard Marks directed the program, with Saul Stein and Martin Wark as writers. Hy Averback was the announcer. The half-hour program was broadcast at 7 p.m. Eastern Time on Sundays, with Lucky Strike cigarettes as sponsor.

== Critical response ==
Radio historian John Dunning commented, "Let's Talk Hollywood was a flagrant attempt to copy the Information, Please formula." He concluded, "The problem with this show was obvious: George Murphy was not Clifton Fadiman, and the panelists were not John Kieran, Franklin P. Adams, and Oscar Levant."

A review in the trade publication Variety also noted the program's similarity to Information Please and said, "Unfortunately, its entertainment quotient is about on a par with its originality."
