= Red Line 7000 =

1965 American action sports film by Howard Hawks

- Directed by: Howard Hawks
- Screenplay by: George Kirgo
- Story by: Howard Hawks
- Produced by: Howard Hawks
- Starring: James Caan; Laura Devon; Gail Hire; Charlene Holt; John Robert Crawford; Marianna Hill; James Ward; Norman Alden
- Cinematography: Milton R. Krasner
- Edited by: Stuart Gilmore; Bill Brame
- Music by: Nelson Riddle
- Distributed by: Paramount Pictures
- Release date: November 9, 1965
- Running time: 110 minutes
- Country: United States
- Language: English
- Box office: $2,500,000

Red Line 7000 is a 1965 American action sports film released by Paramount Pictures. It was directed by Howard Hawks, who also wrote the story. It stars James Caan, Laura Devon and Marianna Hill in a story about young stock-car racers trying to establish themselves and about the complicated romantic relationships in their lives. The title refers to the red line on the car's tachometer, set at 7000 RPM, indicating the maximum safe engine speed, beyond which catastrophic failure would occur. The film features multiple sections of real life racing and crashes interspersed with the plot.

== Plot ==
A racing team run by Pat Kazarian starts out with two drivers, Mike Marsh and Jim Loomis, but a crash at Daytona results in Jim's death. His girlfriend Holly McGregor arrives too late for the race and feels guilty for not being there.

A young driver, Ned Arp, joins the team and also makes a play for Kazarian's sister, Julie. A third driver, Dan McCall, arrives from France and brings along girlfriend Gabrielle Queneau, but soon he develops a romantic interest in Holly.

Arp is seriously hurt in a crash, losing a hand. Mike, meanwhile, doesn't care for Dan's ways with women and tries to run him off the track in a race, but Dan survives. He and Holly end up together, but Mike is consoled by Gabrielle.

The movie is distinguished by the appearance of a 1965 Shelby GT-350 racing on the track, and one of the characters drives a Cobra Daytona Coupe as his street car. For Shelby enthusiasts, this is one of the few movies they appeared in. The car used in the movie is chassis no. CSX2287, the first of the six coupes built. In real life this car competed in seven FIA races in 1964 (Daytona, Sebring, Spa, LeMans, Reims, Goodwood, Tour de France) and one race in 1965 (LeMans), and scored the Daytona Coupe's first GT Class victory at Sebring 1964. In November 1965, this car set 23 national and international speed records at the Bonneville Salt Flats. Shelby American sold the prototype coupe to Jim Russell of the American Russkit model company.

== Cast ==
- James Caan as Mike Marsh
- Laura Devon as Julie Kazarian
- Gail Hire as Holly McGregor
- Charlene Holt as Lindy Bonaparte
- John Robert Crawford as Ned Arp
- Marianna Hill as Gabrielle Queneau
- Skip Ward as Dan McCall (credited as James Ward)
- Norman Alden as Pat Kazarian
- George Takei as Kato
- Teri Garr as Nightclub Dancer (uncredited)
- Diane Strom as Receptionist
- Anthony Rogers as Jim Loomis
- Carol Connors as Waitress
- Cissy Wellman as Waitress

== Production ==
=== Script ===
The film was based on an original idea by Howard Hawks though the script was written by George Kirgo. Hawks said the film would feature "three old fashioned hot love stories about these racers and their girls. They have their own code. They kid about danger. They aren't tough guys but they talk awful rough. The picture will have something of a wartime feeling: on Friday night a girl doesn't know if a boy will still be alive on Saturday night."

Hawks said he originally wanted to tell just the one story but then "suddenly it hit me. 'This is a lot of padding'. Today audiences are way ahead of us. So I added two more stories and now we tell so much more in a few scenes without having to lead up to them step by step. In other words, stripped of all the non essentials." Hawks said that in his film "you don't care who wins the race; it's the people who count."

=== Casting ===
Howard Hawks had enjoyed success discovering stars in the past (Lauren Bacall, Carole Lombard, George Raft) and decided to cast the film with six newcomers plus Charlene Holt and Norman Alden. He said it took five months to cast them. The six newcomers were Gail Hire, Mariana Hill, Laura Devon, James Ward, John Crawford and James Caan (though Caan had been in Lady in a Cage). Howard Hawks considered casting Paul Mantee, who had done Paramount's Robinson Crusoe on Mars, in the lead role, but chose another Paramount star, James Caan.

Carol Connors was a singer who had sold over 8 million records. She wrote two songs for the movie: "Wildcat Jones" and "Prudence Pim of the PTA".

George Takei appears in a supporting role as Kato, a race mechanic partly inspired by Jack Kuramoto, the Japanese American service station owner of Jack's Auto Service in Los Angeles's Little Tokyo, who was a friend of Hawks's and often worked on his personal cars. Takei's casting came one year before his performance on Star Trek. Teri Garr appears uncredited as a go-go dancer in a nightclub.

=== Filming ===
Filming started January 1965.

NASCAR driver Larry Frank helped to film the movie by allowing the film crew to mount cameras on his car. Frank later drove the camera-car in a NASCAR race.

The film features tracks like Daytona International Speedway, Darlington Raceway, and Atlanta Motor Speedway. In this film, it features many crashes from the season, including A. J. Foyt's violent crash at Riverside International Raceway earlier in the year. The camera cars were provided by the Ford company and entered in a regular race with a regular driver. "We're trying to give the sensation of what it means to go that fast - 170 mph - in a car."

Haskell Boggs replaced Milton Krasner as cinematographer during production.

== Reception and legacy ==
The Los Angeles Times called it "rapid, exciting entertainment."

In 1967 Hawks said it was a mistake to cast so many newcomers in the film. "Newcomers are good when you have some competent people to hold them up," he said. "That's why I wouldn't try Red Line 7000 again. It's always been a habit of mine to put new people with pros. It holds them together, gives them a key to tempo. There was nobody for them to take a cue from in Red Line." Filmink magazine later noted of the cast "Caan was the only one to make it and watching Red Line 7000 today it’s not hard to see why: he’s terrific, a believable jock (something which made him a rarity among Hollywood stars, along with Burt Reynolds), sensitive, tormented, sympathetic despite playing a character who when you analyse it is rape-y and loathsome."

The director later said he did not like the movie, feeling it was a problem cutting between stories. "When I got people interested in two people I cut over and started to work with two more and when the audience got interested in them I went over to two others and pretty soon the audience got disgusted and I got disgusted too," said Hawks. "To be serious I think there were some pretty good things in it but as a piece of entertainment I don't think I did a good job. I think there were some individual scenes that were pretty good and there were a lot of great race scenes. But I'm not proud of the picture as a whole."

Caan later called the film "a joke".

Cahiers du Cinéma placed the film in 9th place on their top 10 list of 1966.

Quentin Tarantino is a fan of the film:

If I were to direct a racing movie I would look to mimic a lot of that Sixties AIP flavour. I would probably draw inspiration from Howard Hawks' Red Line 7000 ... It's not pretentious, like Grand Prix and stuff, but the story isn't dissimilar. It's got soap opera with everyone trying to sleep with everyone else, but it's done in a fun way. It actually plays like a really great Elvis Presley movie. Elvis' racing movies were good but not this good. I like the way that Red Line 7000 has a community of characters all staying in this Holiday Inn together and hanging out. That's a cool platform.

== See also ==
- List of American films of 1965
