= Anne Francis =

American actress (1930–2011)

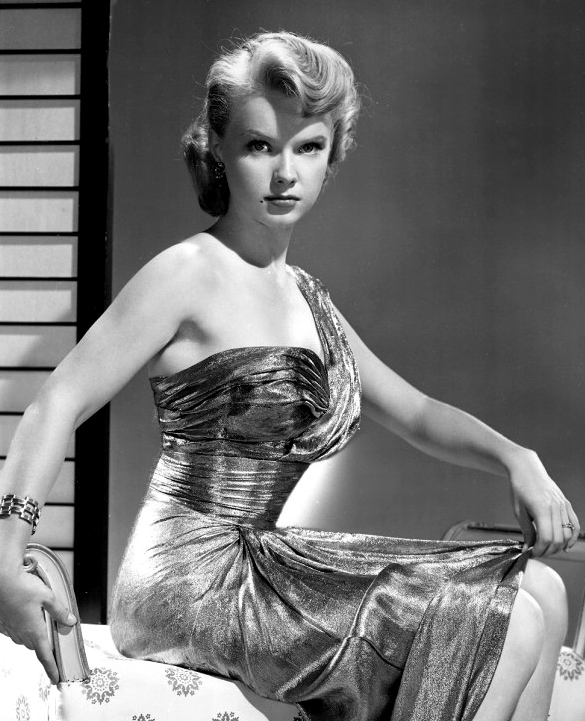
- Studio publicity photo from the 1950s
- Born: Anne Lloyd Francis; September 16, 1930; Ossining, New York, U.S.
- Died: January 2, 2011 (aged 80); Santa Barbara, California, U.S.
- Other name: Ann Francis
- Occupation: Actress
- Years active: 1936–2006
- Known for: Forbidden Planet; Bad Day at Black Rock; Blackboard Jungle
- Television: Honey West
- Spouses: Bamlet Lawrence Price, Jr. (m. 1952; div. 1955); Robert Abeloff (m. 1960; div. 1964)
- Children: 2

Anne Lloyd Francis (September 16, 1930 – January 2, 2011) was an American actress known for her pioneering roles in the science fiction film Forbidden Planet (1956) and the television action-drama series Honey West (1965–1966). Forbidden Planet marked a first in in-color, big-budget, science fiction-themed motion pictures. Nine years later, Francis challenged female stereotypes in Honey West, in which she played a perky blonde private investigator who was as quick with body slams as with witty one-liners. She earned a Golden Globe Award and Emmy Award nomination for her performance.

Francis was also known for two other classic 1950s films, Bad Day at Black Rock and Blackboard Jungle. She had a trademark mole near her lower lip. The beauty mark was even written into the script of one of her films. In 2005, TV Guide ranked Francis at number 18 on its "50 Sexiest Stars of All Time" list.

== Early life ==
Francis was born in Ossining, New York. Contrary to some sources, which erroneously claim she was born Ann Marvak (rather than Francis), her parents' marriage registration and census records from 1925 and 1930 confirm that their names were Philip Ward Francis and Edith (née Albertson) Francis. She was their only child.

Francis entered show business as a child, working as a model at 5 years old to assist her family during the Great Depression. She made her Broadway debut at the age of 11.

== Career ==
=== Movies ===
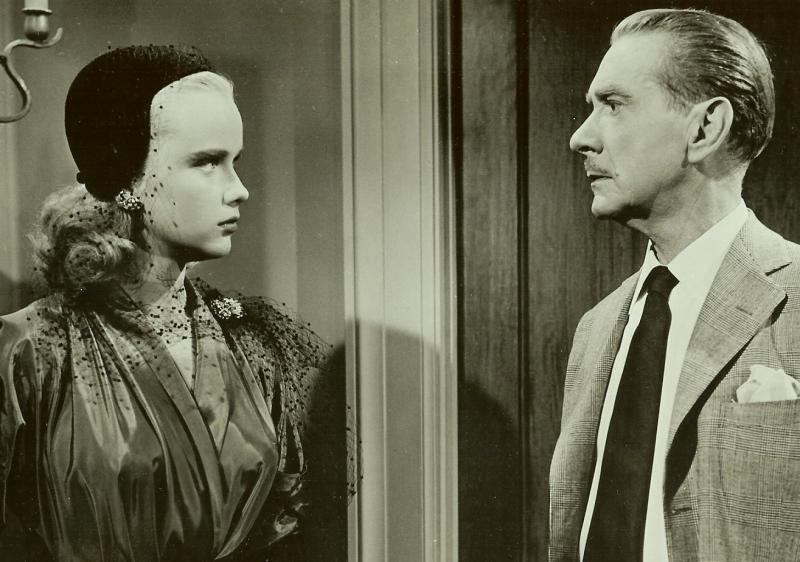
Francis and Clifton Webb in Dreamboat (1952)

Francis was put under contract to MGM and made her first film appearances in This Time for Keeps (1947) and Summer Holiday (1948). She played supporting roles in the films So Young, So Bad (1950), Lydia Bailey (1952), The Rocket Man (1954), Susan Slept Here (1954), and Bad Day at Black Rock (1955); her first leading role was in Blackboard Jungle (1955). Her best-known film role is that of Altaira in Forbidden Planet (1956), a science-fiction classic that was nominated for a best-effects Oscar.

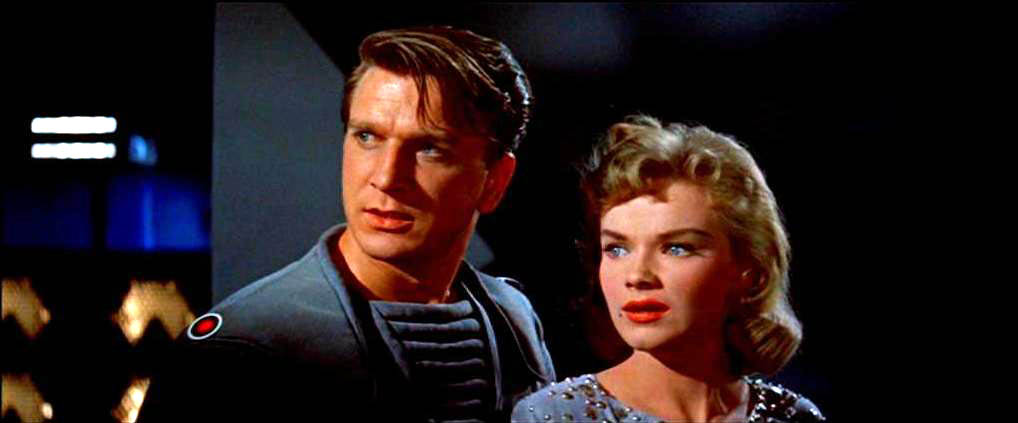
Leslie Nielsen and Francis in Forbidden Planet, 1956

Her movie roles were then confined to low-budget efforts: a call girl in Girl of the Night (1960), a scheming trophy wife in Brainstorm (1965), as Jerry Lewis's wife in Hook, Line & Sinker (1969), and as a co-star to a young Burt Reynolds in the adventure movie Impasse (1969). An exception was her role as chorine Georgia James in Funny Girl (1968).

=== Television ===
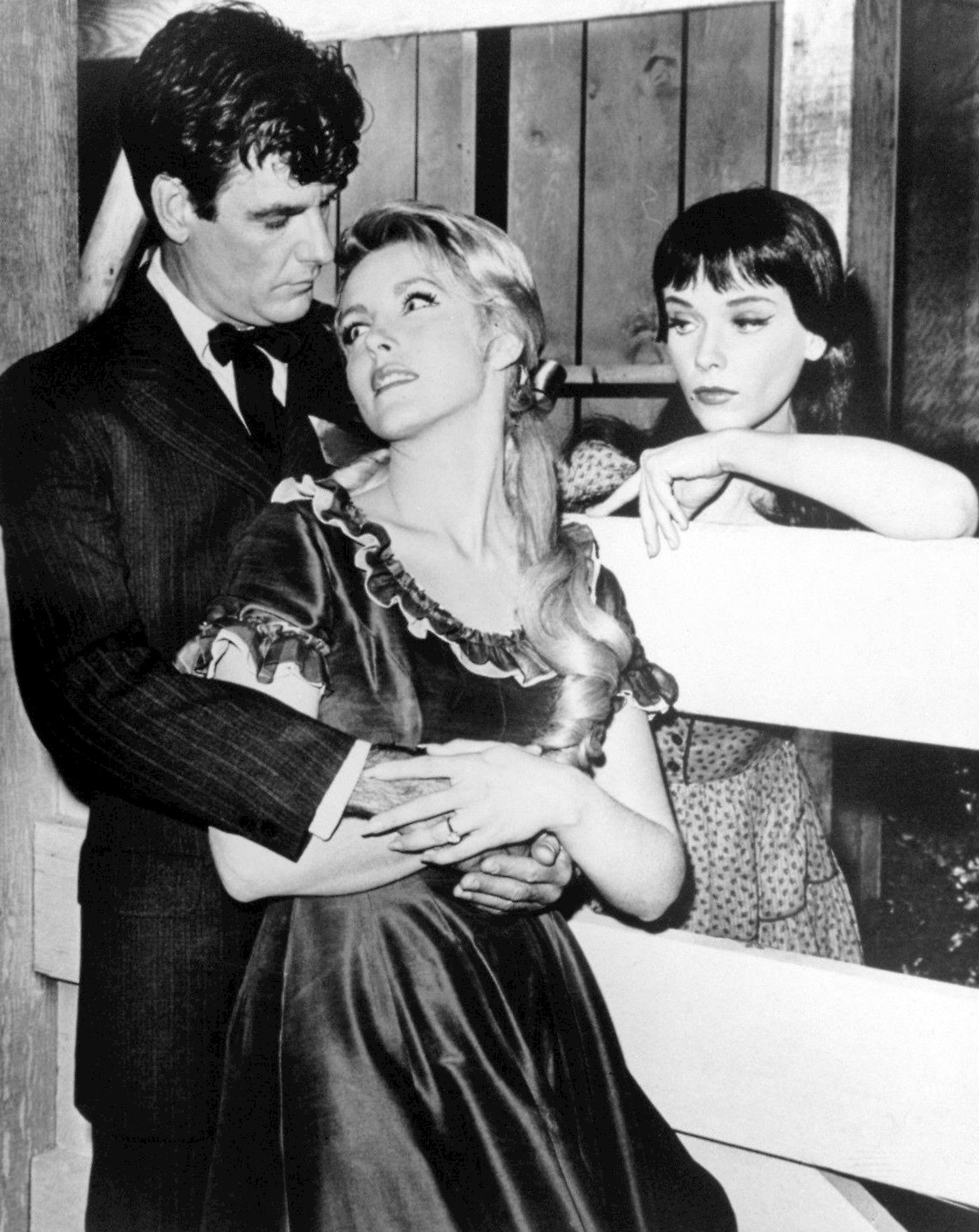
James Best, Laura Devon, and Anne Francis (right) in "Jess-Belle", an episode of The Twilight Zone (1963)

When motion-picture opportunities became scarcer for Francis near the close of the 1950s, she moved to television. Beginning as a guest on The Untouchables and as the title character in The Doreen Maney Story, she appeared in two episodes of The Twilight Zone ("The After Hours" and "Jess-Belle"), two episodes of Alfred Hitchcock Presents ("Hooked" and "Keep Me Company"), and three episodes of The Alfred Hitchcock Hour ("What Really Happened," "Blood Bargain," and "The Trap"). In 1961, she appeared twice in Route 66, first in "Play it Glissando" and then "A Month of Sundays". Francis appeared in two episodes of the Western series The Virginian, two episodes of Columbo ("Short Fuse" and "A Stitch in Crime") and the episode "Incident of the Shambling Man" on the CBS Western Rawhide. She was cast in an episode of Gene Kelly's drama series, Going My Way, based on the 1944 film of the same name. During 1964, she guest-starred in "Hideout" and "Rachel's Mother" in The Reporter, as well as two successive appearances in The Man from U.N.C.L.E.. She appeared in season four, episode 10 of Mission: Impossible, titled "The Double Circle".

=== Honey West ===
Honey West was an action drama; the character was formally introduced in the April 21, 1965, episode of Burke's Law titled "Who Killed the Jackpot?", after which it was spun off as a series that lasted one season of 30 half-hour episodes. Honey was a shrewd, high-energy private investigator who collaborated with assistant Sam Bolt (John Ericson) in a company that was inherited from her father. At home, she cared for her pet ocelot named Bruce.

The show was canceled due to budgetary considerations, and ABC executives imported the similarly-themed hit British show The Avengers.

=== Late television career ===
Francis made a guest appearance in a 1967 episode of The Fugitive and in The Invaders the same year. She guest-starred in a 1973 episode of Barnaby Jones, "Murder in the Doll's House".

At the start of the final season of My Three Sons in 1971, Francis played bowling-alley waitress Terri Dowling, who married character Laird Fergus McBain Douglas of Sithian Bridge, Scotland, and returned to his homeland as a member of the nobility. (Fred MacMurray played the dual-character roles of Steve Douglas and Fergus McBain Douglas in this four-part story arc.) She appeared twice as a guest star on Columbo, once as the manipulated lover of the murderer ("Short Fuse", 1972) and once as the murder victim ("A Stitch in Crime", 1973).

In 1974, Francis appeared as Ida, the madame of a bawdy house, in the series Kung Fu in the episode "Night of the Owls, Day of the Doves". In 1975, she appeared as Abby in an episode of Movin' On titled "The Price of Loving." In 1976, she appeared as Lola Flynn in an episode of Wonder Woman, entitled "Beauty on Parade". In 1977, she appeared as Lieutenant Commander Gladys Hope, the head nurse in two episodes of the World War II series Baa Baa Black Sheep. She portrayed Melissa Osborne in the episode "How Do I Kill Thee?" of The Eddie Capra Mysteries in 1978.

During the 1980–81 season of Dallas, Francis had a recurring role as Arliss Cooper, the mother of Mitch and Afton Cooper. In 1982, she played an armored car robber and mother in the "In the Best of Families" episode of CHiPs. The same year she had a cameo in the TV movie Mazes and Monsters starring Tom Hanks. She later played Mama Jo in the first few episodes (four total) of the 1984 TV-detective series Riptide. In that same year, she guest-starred in the premiere episode of Murder, She Wrote, credited as Anne Lloyd Francis; she went on to guest-star in two more episodes during the show's run. In December 1984, again credited as Anne Lloyd Francis, she guest-starred in the Christmas-themed S8 E13 of The Love Boat playing the mother of Kim Lankford's character, Carol, in the vignette "Noel's Christmas Carol." She appeared on episodes of Matlock and The Golden Girls.

In 1996, Francis appeared in the Wings episode "The Lady Vanishes" as Vera, a 1940s gun moll. In 1997, in the Home Improvement episode "A Funny Valentine", she appeared as Liddy, Tim Allen's high school classmate's mother. She guest-starred in 1998 on The Drew Carey Show as the mother of Drew's girlfriend Nicki in the episodes "Nicki's Parents" and "Nicki's Wedding." Francis's final television acting role was in "Shadows," a 2004 episode of Without a Trace.

== Personal life, illness and death ==
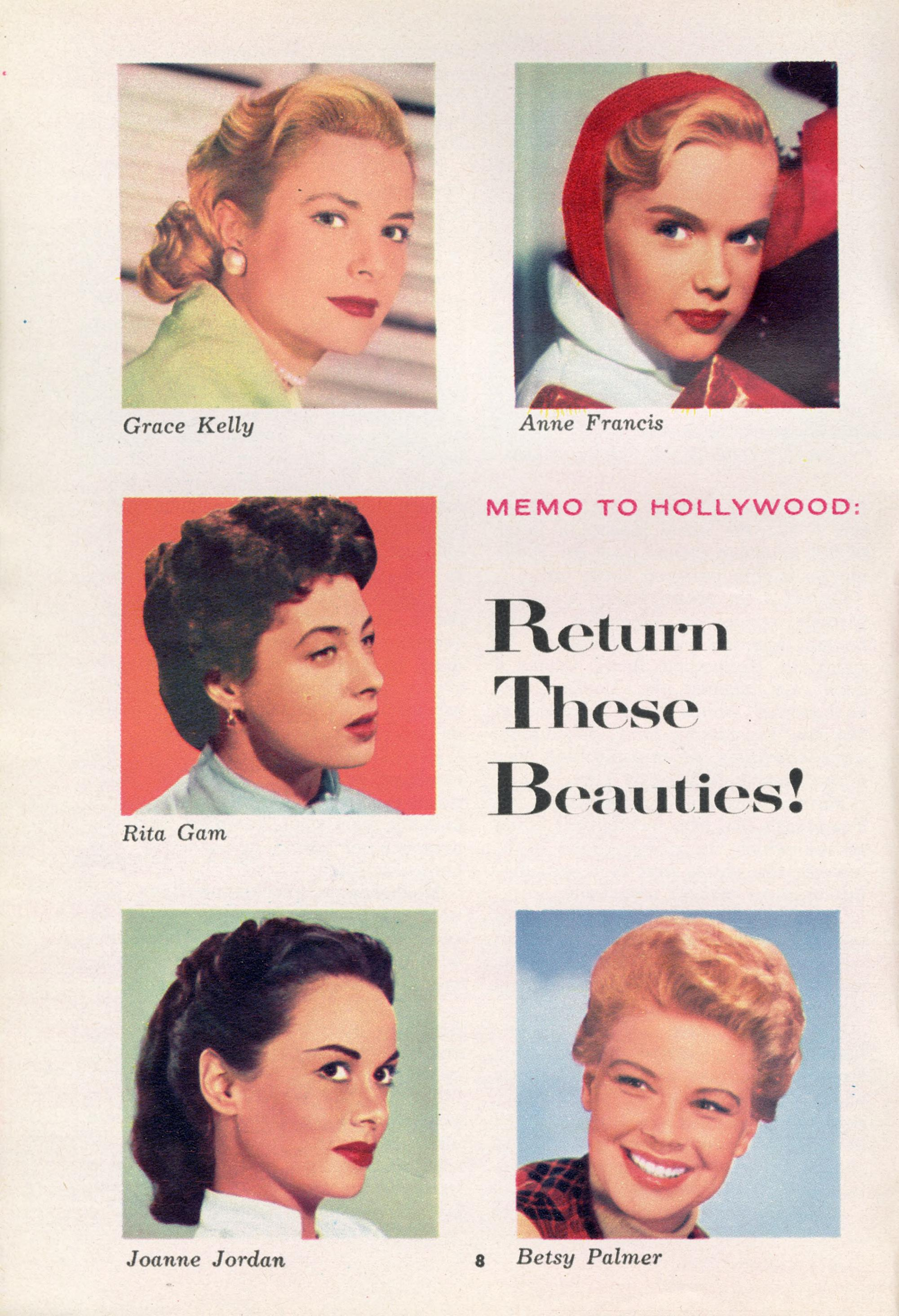
Francis (top row, right) in TV Guide, October 30, 1954

From May 1952 through April 1955, Francis was married to former United States Army Air Forces pilot Bamlet Lawrence Price Jr., who became a director, writer, actor, producer and editor. She then was married to Robert D. Abeloff, a Beverly Hills dentist, from 1960 through 1964. She never remarried after divorcing Abeloff.

Francis and Abeloff had one daughter. Francis later adopted another daughter, one of the first adoptions granted to an unmarried person in California.

Francis studied flying toward the end of the 1960s, eventually earning her pilot's certificate.

In 1982, Francis published an autobiography, Voices from Home: An Inner Journey. On its cover, she wrote that the book "is my spiritual exposé. It is about our essence of being, the inner workings of mind and spirit, which contribute to the growth of the invisible and most important part of us." A subsequent biography titled Anne Francis: The Life and Career was written by Laura Wagner and published by McFarland & Company in 2011.

A smoker for much of her adult life, Francis said that she quit the habit in the mid-1980s but was diagnosed with non-small-cell lung cancer in 2006.

Francis died from complications due to pancreatic cancer on January 2, 2011, at a retirement home in Santa Barbara, California. Her ashes were scattered in the Pacific Ocean.

== Filmography ==
=== Film ===
Year	Title	Role	Notes
1947	This Time for Keeps	Bobby Soxer	Uncredited
1948	Summer Holiday	Elsie Rand	
1948	The Pirate	Nina	Uncredited
1948	Portrait of Jennie	Teenager in Art Gallery	Uncredited
1950	So Young, So Bad	Loretta Wilson	
1951	The Whistle at Eaton Falls	Jean	
1951	Elopement	Jacqueline "Jake" Osborne	
1952	Lydia Bailey	Lydia Bailey	
1952	Dreamboat	Carol Sayre	
1953	A Lion Is in the Streets	"Flamingo" McManamee	
1954	The Rocket Man	June Brown	
1954	Susan Slept Here	Isabella Alexander	
1954	Rogue Cop	Nancy Corlane	
1955	Bad Day at Black Rock	Liz Wirth	
1955	Battle Cry	Rae	
1955	Blackboard Jungle	Anne Dadier	
1955	The Scarlet Coat	Sally Cameron	
1956	Forbidden Planet	Altaira Morbius	
1956	The Rack	Aggie Hall	
1956	The Great American Pastime	Betty Hallerton	
1957	The Hired Gun	Ellen Beldon	
1957	Don't Go Near the Water	Lieutenant Alice Tomlen	
1960	The Crowded Sky	Kitty Foster	
1960	Girl of the Night	Robin "Bobbie" Williams	
1965	The Satan Bug	Ann Williams	
1965	Brainstorm	Lorrie Benson	
1968	Funny Girl	Georgia James	
1969	More Dead Than Alive	Monica Alton	
1969	Hook, Line & Sinker	Nancy Ingersoll	
1969	Impasse	Bobby Jones	
1969	The Love God?	Lisa LaMonica	
1976	Survival	Anne	
1978	Born Again	Patty Colson	
1985	Return	Eileen Sedgeley	
1990	Little Vegas	Martha	
1995	Lover's Knot	Marian Hunter	

=== Television ===
Year	Title	Role	Notes
1949	Suspense	Lois	Episode: "Dr. Violet"
1949–1950	Kraft Television Theatre	Odette	6 episodes
1949–1951	Versatile Varieties	Bonny Maid	
1949–1958	Studio One	Wichita Jones/Kristin	2 episodes
1950	Lights Out		Episode: "The Faithful Heart"
1954	The Ford Television Theatre	Linda Wolcott	Episode: "The Tryst"
1954	Lux Video Theatre		Episode: "Perished Leaves"
1958	Climax!	Mary Bellason/Teddy Baxter	2 episodes
1959	The David Niven Show	Marna Edwards	Episode: "The Twist of the Key"
1959	Rawhide	Rose Whitman	Episode: "Incident of the Shambling Man"
1959	Adventures in Paradise	Anne Meadow	Episode: "The Bamboo Curtain"
1959	The Third Commandment		TV film
1960	Startime	Emma	Episode: "Jeff Mcleaod, the Last Reb"
1960	Sunday Showcase	Fanny Holmes	Episode: "Our American Heritage: Autocrat and Son"
1960	The Untouchables	Doreen Maney	Episode: "The Doreen Maney Story"
1960–1961	Alfred Hitchcock Presents	Nyla Foster/Julia Reddy	2 episodes
1960–1963	The Twilight Zone	Jess-Belle Stone/Marsha White	Episodes: "The After Hours" and "Jess-Belle"
1961	Route 66	Jana Johnson/Arline Simms	2 episodes
1961	Dr. Kildare	Kathy Stebbins	Episode: "A Million Dollar Property"
1963–1965	The Alfred Hitchcock Hour	Various	3 episodes
1963–1965	Burke's Law	Suzanne Foster/Honey West	2 episodes
1964	Death Valley Days	Pearl Hart	Episode: "The Last Stagecoach Robbery
1964	The Man From U.N.C.L.E.	Gervaise Ravel	2 episodes
1964–1970	The Virginian	Victoria Greenly/Myra Greencastle	2 episodes
1965–1966	Honey West	Honey West	
1965–1978	The Magical World of Disney	Adeline Jones/Marian Lockhart	4 episodes
1967	The Fugitive	Felice Geer	Episode: "The One That Got Away"
1967	The Invaders	Annie Rhodes	Episode: "The Saucer"
1968–1970	The Name of the Game	Carol Sherman/Marsha Ryman	2 episodes
1969	Mission: Impossible	Gillian Colbee	Episode: "The Double Circle"
1969	Lost Flight	Gina Talbott	TV film
1970	Love, American Style	Claudia	Segment: "Love and the Visitor"
1970	The Intruders	Leora Garrison	TV film
1970	Wild Women	Jean Marshek	TV film
1970	Dan August	Gina Talbott	Episode: "Murder by Proxy"
1970–1973	Insight	Claire/Gert Halpern	2 episodes
1970–1973	The F.B.I.	Shelly Brimlow/Didi Lamarie	2 episodes
1971	The Forgotten Man	Marie Hardy Forrest	TV film
1971	My Three Sons	Terri Dowling	3 episodes
1971	Steel Wreath	Angel	TV film
1972	Gunsmoke	Sarah	Episode: "Sarah"
1972	Assignment Vienna	Aline Masterson	Episode: "Queen's Gambit"
1972–1973	Columbo	Valerie Bishop/Nurse Sharon Martin	2 episodes
1972–1974	Ironside	Angela Griffin/Karen Gillis	2 episodes
1973	Cannon	Peggy Angel	Episode: "Murder by Proxy"
1973	Barnaby Jones	Miriam Woodridge	Episode: "Murder in a Dolls House"
1974	Banacek	Katherine Wells	Episode: "Horse of a Slightly Different Color"
1974	Cry Panic	Julie	TV film
1974	Kung Fu	Ida Quinlan	Episode: "Night of the Owls, Day of the Doves"
1974	The F.B.I. Story: The FBI Versus Alvin Karpis, Public Enemy Number One	Colette	TV film
1975	The Last Survivors	Helen Dixon	TV film
1975	A Girl Named Sooner	Selma Goss	TV film
1975	Archer	Angela Lawrence	Episode: "The Vanished Man"
1975	Movin' On	Abby	Episode: "The Price of Loving"
1975	Ellery Queen	Nurse Chandler	Episode: "The Adventure of the Lover's Leap"
1975	Petrocelli	Emily Burke	Episode: "Terror by the Book"
1975	S.W.A.T.	Doris Wainwright Bristol	Episode: "Silent Night, Deadly Night"
1975	Mobile One	Ginny Dunn	Episode: "The Listening Ear"
1976	Bert D'Angelo/Superstar	Angela Griffin	Episode: "Scag"
1976	Wonder Woman	Lola Flynn	Episode: "Beauty on Parade"
1976	Banjo Hackett: Roamin' Free	Flora Dobbs	TV film
1976–1978	Police Woman	Sergeant Loretta Muldare/Liz Adams	2 episodes
1978	What Really Happened to the Class of '65?	Carol	Episode: "The Girl Who Always Said No"
1978	Flying High	Susan Vale	Episode: "Fear of Cheesecake"
1978	Vega$	Lillian Ross	Episode: "Mother Miskin"
1978	Hawaii Five-O	Alicia Wade	Episode: "When Does a War End?"
1978	The Eddie Capra Mysteries	Melissa Osborne	Episode: "How Do I Kill Thee"
1978	Little Mo	Sophie Fisher	TV film
1978–1980	Charlie's Angels	Margo/Cindy Barton	2 episodes
1978–1981	Fantasy Island	Various	3 episodes
1979	Quincy, M.E.	Elizabeth Shafer	Episode: "Physician, Heal Thyself"
1979	The Rebels	Mrs. Harris	Miniseries
1979	Beggarman, Thief	Teresa Kraler	TV film
1980	The Littlest Hobo	Mrs. Penelope Conrad	Episode: "Romiet and Julio"
1980	Detour to Terror	Sheila	TV film
1980	Dan August: The Jealousy Factor	Nina Porter	TV film
1980–1983	Trapper John, M.D.	Gail Edsin/Mrs. Havenhurst	2 episodes
1981	Dallas	Arliss Cooper	4 episodes
1981	CHiPs	Susan Wright	Episode: "In the Best of Families"
1982	Mazes and Monsters	Ellie	TV film
1983	O'Malley	Amanda O'Malley	TV film
1983	Charley's Aunt	Donna Lucia D'Alvadorez	TV film
1984	Riptide	Mama Jo	6 episodes
1984	The Love Boat	Mrs. Kelsey	2 episodes
1984	Partners in Crime	Sarah	Episode: "Getting in Shape"
1984–1990	Murder, She Wrote	Various	3 episodes
1985	Crazy Like a Fox	Sister Elizabeth	Episode: "Premium for Murder"
1985	Hardcastle and McCormick	Jane Bigelow	Episode: "The Long Ago Girl"
1985	Finder of Lost Loves	Ruth Cunningham	Episode: "Connections"
1986	A Masterpiece of Murder	Ruth Beekman	TV film
1987	Laguna Heat	Helene Long	TV film
1987	Jake and the Fatman	Dixie	Episode: "Fatal Attraction"
1987	Poor Little Rich Girl: The Barbara Hutton Story	Marjorie Post Hutton	TV film
1988	My First Love	Terry	TV film
1989	Matlock	Janet Masters	Episode: "The Starlet"
1989	The Golden Girls	Trudy McMahon	Episode: "Til Death Do We Volley"
1992	Love Can Be Murder	Maggie O'Brien	TV film
1993	The Double 0 Kid	Maggie O'Brien	TV film
1994	Burke's Law	Honey Best	Episode: "Who Killed Nick Hazard?"
1994	Fortune Hunter	Mrs. Brady	Episode: "The Frostfire Intercept"
1996	Wings	Vera	Episode: "The Lady Vanishes"
1996	Have You Seen My Son	Catherine Pritcher	TV film
1997	Home Improvement	Liddy Talbot	Episode: "A Funny Valentine"
1997	Conan the Adventurer	Gagool	Episode: "The Curse of Afka"
1998	Nash Bridges	Julia Ann Porter	Episode: "Sacaraments"
1998	The Drew Carey Show	Charlene Fifer	2 episodes
1999	Fantasy Island	Cassie	Episode: "Heroes"
2004	Without a Trace	Rose Atwood	Episode: "Shadows"
