= Leon Lontoc =

Filipino-American film and television actor

- Born: February 20, 1908; Manila, Philippines
- Died: January 22, 1974 (aged 65); Los Angeles, California
- Occupations: Film and television actor
- Years active: 1943–1974

Leon Lontoc (February 20, 1908 – January 22, 1974) was a Filipino-American film and television actor. He was known for playing the role of Henry in the American detective fiction television series Burke's Law.

== Life and career ==
Lontoc was born in Manila, the brother of doctor Rudolfo M. Lontok. He emigrated to the United States in 1927, settling in Hollywood, California. Lontoc began his screen career in 1943 with the uncredited role of a Japanese guard in the film Behind the Rising Sun.

Later in his career, Lontoc guest-starred in television programs, The Adventures of Superman, Ironside, McHale's Navy, Hawaiian Eye, The Wackiest Ship in the Army, Bonanza, The Man from U.N.C.L.E., Mission: Impossible, Jungle Jim, Here Comes the Brides and Alfred Hitchcock Presents. He also co-starred and appeared in films, such as, One Spy Too Many, Ma and Pa Kettle at Waikiki, Singin' in the Rain, The Damned Don't Cry, The Ugly American, God Is My Co-Pilot, Cargo to Capetown, On the Isle of Samoa, The Left Hand of God, The Revolt of Mamie Stover, The Hunters, Operation Petticoat, The Spiral Road, Panic in the City and The Gallant Hours. His last credit was from the sitcom television series The Brady Bunch.

In 1963, Lontoc was cast to play the role of Henry, the Filipino chauffeur of the lead character Amos Burke in the ABC detective fiction television series Burke's Law. He also founded and worked at the restaurant Don the Beachcomber.

== Death ==
Lontoc died in January 1974 in Los Angeles, California, at the age of 65. He was buried in Holy Cross Cemetery in Hollywood, California.

== Selected filmography ==
- Alfred Hitchcock Presents (1961) (Season 6 Episode 24: "A Woman's Help") as Chester
- The Ugly American (1963) as Lee Pang
