= Gunn (film) =

1967 film by Blake Edwards

- Theatrical release poster
- Directed by: Blake Edwards
- Screenplay by: William Peter Blatty; Blake Edwards
- Story by: Blake Edwards
- Based on: Peter Gunn by Blake Edwards
- Produced by: Owen Crump; Blake Edwards
- Starring: Craig Stevens; Laura Devon; Edward Asner; Albert Paulsen; Sherry Jackson; Helen Traubel
- Cinematography: Philip Lathrop
- Edited by: Peter Zinner
- Music by: The Gordian Knot; Henry Mancini
- Distributed by: Paramount Pictures
- Release date: June 28, 1967
- Running time: 93 minutes
- Country: United States
- Language: English

Gunn is a 1967 American neo noir mystery film directed by Blake Edwards, and starring Craig Stevens, based on the 1958–1961 television series Peter Gunn. Stevens was the only regular cast member from the original series to appear in the film; the characters of Gunn's singing girlfriend Edie Hart, club owner "Mother", and police lieutenant Charles Jacoby were all recast for the film. The movie was intended to be the first in a projected series of Peter Gunn feature films, but no sequels followed.

== Plot ==
When a gangster named Julio Scarlotti is murdered on his yacht, private investigator Peter Gunn investigates because Scarlotti once saved his life. After Mother's nightclub is bombed, Gunn and his law enforcement buddy, Lieutenant Charles Jacoby, begin to pressure ambitious hood Fusco, who aspires to become the city's new kingpin. Eventually the investigation leads to a shocking ending.

== Cast ==
- Craig Stevens as Peter Gunn
- Laura Devon as Edie Hart, lounge singer and Peter's girlfriend
- Edward Asner as Lieutenant Charles Jacoby, a police detective and friend of Gunn
- Albert Paulsen as Fusco, underworld kingpin
- Sherry Jackson as Samantha
- Helen Traubel as Mother, owner of the nightclub, Mother's
- Jerry Douglas as Dave Corwin
- J. Pat O'Malley as Tinker, an informant
- Regis Toomey as The Bishop, an informant
- George Murdock as Archie
- Lincoln Demyan as Julio Scarlotti
- Chanin Hale as Mistress
- Charles Dierkop as Laszlo Joyce
- Alan Oppenheimer as Whiteside
- Wayne Heffley as Sergeant Ashford
- Carol Wayne as Ernestine
- Dick Crockett as Leo Gracey
- Marion Marshall as Daisy Jane

== Production ==
William Friedkin recalled that he met Blake Edwards in September 1966. Edwards told him he was considering a return of the Peter Gunn television show but would begin by making a Peter Gunn feature film. Edwards told Friedkin that Charles Bludhorn, the new head of Paramount thought Lola Albright "too old" to resume her former role of Edie Hart and instead wanted an Austrian actress whom Edwards rejected. Laura Devon was then cast in the role. The character of Mother, played first by Hope Emerson and then by Minerva Urecal on the series, was played by Helen Traubel in the film as both Emerson and Urecal had died. The role of Lieutenant Charles Jacoby, originally played by Herschel Bernardi, was recast for the film with Ed Asner.

Edwards wanted Friedkin to direct the film but Friedkin thought William Peter Blatty's script was awful, explaining the script was like some of the old television episodes cobbled together rather than something new and exciting. Edwards directed the film himself. Blatty was impressed by Friedkin's honesty and asked him to direct The Exorcist (1973). Edwards' film was originally titled—but then only advertised as—Gunn...Number One!; no sequels followed. Julie Andrews mentions in her book, Home Work, that her husband Edwards, had collaborated with William Peter Blatty in writing several films, including Gunn.

As for Friedkin's comment that the script was like some of the old television episodes cobbled together, the film borrows heavily from the series pilot - season 1 episode 1, "The Kill" (mobster's death by fake Coast Guard vs fake police, burial, romantic interlude, meeting at racquetball court, bombing at Mother's) - and lifts sequences from three other episodes: season 2 episode 12, "The Briefcase" (girl in Gunn's apartment); season 2 episode 22, "Hollywood Calling" (chase through the boatyard); and season 3 episode 34, "Death Is a Four Letter Word" (talking to an informant).

In a 2016 interview, Sherry Jackson told how she was hired for the movie. "A friend took me to lunch in the noisy Paramount commissary while I was wearing the costume from the Star Trek episode, "What Are Little Girls Made Of?". I'm terribly near-sighted and when we walked in, it got quieter and quieter, so I asked what was happening. Turns out, they were all looking at me. All the seats were full, so we got a table in the director's room where Blake Edwards happened to be sitting. My friend told me he began pointing to me and giving hand signals to Craig Stevens in another part of the room and yelling to him 'Sam! Sam!' That turned out to be a character in Edwards' next film, Gunn, and I was offered the part." Herbert F. Solow, Paramount executive, recalled that the friend who led Jackson into the commissary was Star Trek actor William Shatner.

Jackson continued: "But Paramount knew it was not going to be a big hit, so they wanted to use me to promote it. They got Playboy involved and offered me $25,000 to appear in the magazine." When Jackson declined, she says Paramount threatened to release some of the risqué still photos from the movie. According to Jackson, the studio said if she did the Playboy shoot, tame by today's standards, she would have control over which images were published. "I was incensed, but accepted on the condition I wouldn’t take any money for it," she explained. Jackson was filmed in a nude scene that appeared only in the international version, not the U.S. release. Stills of the nude scene appeared in the August 1967 issue of Playboy magazine, in a pictorial entitled "Make Room For Sherry".

In the TV series, Peter Gunn drives Chrysler convertibles. In this movie, he drives a 1967 Ford Thunderbird hardtop. Playing the part of Daisy Jane in this movie, Marion Marshall was a veteran of the Peter Gunn series, having been in the season 1 episode, "The Chinese Hangman," playing the part of Joanna Lund. Reprising his role as a well-spoken though tipsy informant, J. Pat O'Malley appeared in the film as Tinker; he played the essentially same character in the Peter Gunn series' season 2 episode, "The Price is Murder", as Pithias, and in the season 3 episode, "Death Is a Four Letter Word", as Luther.

ABC, the network which previously aired the third and final season of the Peter Gunn television series in 1960–61, first broadcast the film on the March 26, 1973, edition of The ABC Monday Night Movie; CBS later ran the film as part its Late Movie four times between May 14, 1974, and June 3, 1975. Although the complete Peter Gunn television series is available on VHS and DVD, the film version of Gunn has never been issued on home video in any format.

== Music ==
Director Blake Edwards said, "As I entered the first scoring session of our new Gunn film, I was delighted to see that the band contained most of the familiar faces that had done the original TV show...Hank (Henry Mancini) and I had discussed the music for the Gunn film thoroughly, and he confessed to me that this was to be one of his most difficult assignments. The six years that had passed since the TV Peter Gunn went off the air had seen sweeping changes, not only in jazz, but in all phases of the pop music spectrum...As the score unfolded, everyone on that scoring stage agreed that Hank had done what was needed -- he had brought Peter Gunn up to date without sacrificing the feel and excitement of the original. I think you will agree." The only songs in the film that originated from the original series are "Peter Gunn" and "Dreamsville".

In 1967, RCA Victor released, Gunn ...Number One!, Music from the Motion Picture Score composed and conducted by Henry Mancini. It was recorded at RCA Victor's Music Center of the World studios in Hollywood, California. The soundtrack CD, Gunn ...Number One!, was released by RCA/BMG Music Spain, S.A. in 1999.

Listed on the credits, the featured soloists are: Pete Candoli, trumpet; Dick Nash, trombone; Plas Johnson, Selmer varitone electric sax; Vincent DeRosa, French horn; Ted Nash, alto and baritone sax, flute; Bud Shank, baritone sax; Bob Bain, guitar; Jimmy Rowles, piano; Ray Brown, bass; Shelly Manne, drums; and Larry Bunker, vibes.

== Soundtrack ==
Below are the soundtrack song titles, durations, and credited soloists:

1. "Peter Gunn" – 2:05 — Plas Johnson
2. "A Quiet Happening" – 3:05 —Ted Nash, Bud Shank, Ray Brown
3. "Dreamsville" – 3:46 — Larry Bunker, Vincent DeRosa
4. "Sky Watch" – 3:22 — Bunker, Jimmy Rowles, Pete Candoli, Nash
5. "A Bluish Bag" – 2:53
6. "Theme for Sam" – 3:10 — Rowles
7. "The Monkey Farm" – 2:23 — Bob Bain, Nash, Johnson
8. "A Lovely Sound" – 3:32 — Dick Nash
9. "I Like the Look" – 2:39 — Brown, Shelly Manne
10. "Silver Tears" – 3:31 — Bunker, Bain
11. "Sweet!" – 3:06 — Bunker, Candoli, Nash
12. "Night Owl" – 3:47 — Nash
13. "Bye Bye" – 2:08 — Manne
