= Laura Devon =

American actress and singer (1931–2007)

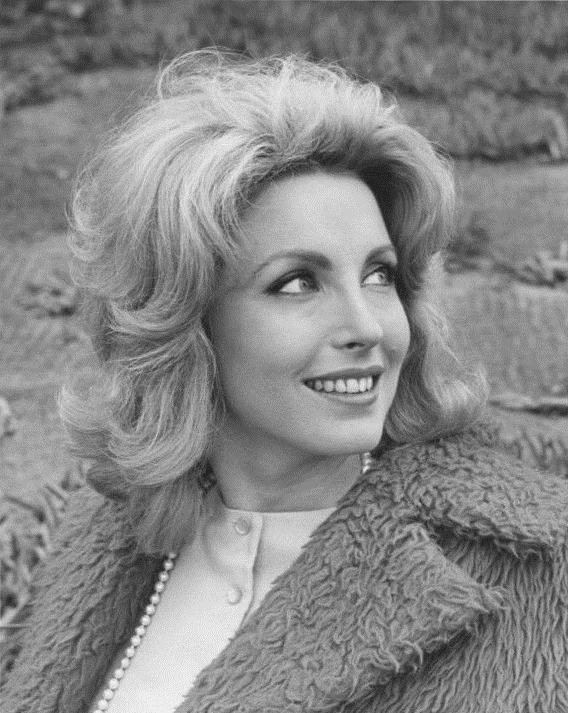
- Devon in The Lieutenant (1963)
- Born: Mary Louise Briley; May 23, 1931; Chicago, Illinois, U.S.
- Died: July 19, 2007 (aged 76); Beverly Hills, California, U.S.
- Resting place: Westwood Memorial Park
- Occupations: Actor; singer
- Years active: 1960–1967 (actor)
- Spouses: Peter Kosiba (m. 1950; div. 1951) Cleland Clark (m. 1951; div. 1961) Brian Kelly (m. 1962; div. 1966) Maurice Jarre (m. 1967; div. 1984)
- Children: Kevin Jarre

Laura Devon (born Mary Louise Briley; May 23, 1931 – July 19, 2007) was an American actress and singer.

== Early life ==
Laura Devon was born May 23, 1931, in Chicago, Illinois. Her birth name has been given as either Mary Lou Briley or Mary Laura Briley. Her father was identified in the press as Merrill Devon, an automotive engineer, and her mother as Velma Prather.

Devon attended school in Chicago and Grosse Pointe. She entered Wayne State University, majoring in journalism and political science, where she learned how to act in school theater productions.

In 1954, Devon gave birth to her only child, who, as Kevin Jarre, would become a noted screenwriter. After performing in amateur theatricals and light opera, her first professional part was a lead in a production of The Boy Friend at the Vanguard Playhouse in Detroit.

In 1962, Devon married Brian Kelly, son of Justice Harry F. Kelly, then a member of the Michigan Supreme Court and a former Michigan governor. Kelly was a fellow actor and, a month after their wedding, he and Devon appeared together on stage in Lillian Hellman's Toys in the Attic at the Laguna Beach Summer Theater. Two years later, he was to become well known for his role as Porter Ricks on the TV series Flipper. They divorced in January 1966.

== Screen career ==
In 1961, Devon was discovered by Bob Goldstein of 20th Century Fox while she was singing at the London Chop House in Detroit. She tells the story of her coming to Hollywood in this way:

There was talk about testing me for "High Heels" at the time. I had an agent at MCA who told me UI was also interested: he took me there first to test and they signed me to a contract straight off, so I never got to 20th. But for the full year at U.I. I was never put into a picture. I had voice, dancing and acting lessons: Louis Graveure coached me in singing, Charles Conrad in drama, and the studio paid the bills. It was like being totally subsidized and with nothing to do but study.

During an eight-year period, from 1960 to 1967, Devon had featured roles in numerous popular TV shows. A 1962 appearance in Route 66 (S3E1) was her first significant part. Following that, she appeared in: Insight, The New Breed, The Twilight Zone, Stoney Burke, The Alfred Hitchcock Hour, Rawhide (an episode entitled "Canliss", as Dean Martin's gunfighter character's wife in 1964), Bob Hope Presents the Chrysler Theatre, The Rogues, Bonanza, I Spy, The Fugitive, T.H.E. Cat, The Big Valley, Coronet Blue, and The Invaders. She had a recurring role on four episodes of Dr. Kildare and she was a member of the repertory cast that rotated major and supporting roles on the critically acclaimed series The Richard Boone Show.

In addition, Devon appeared in five feature-length commercial films, playing Rusty Sartori in Goodbye Charlie (1964), Julie Kazarian in Red Line 7000 (1965), Marie Champlain in Chamber of Horrors (1966), Rosemary in A Covenant with Death (1967) and Edie Hart in Gunn (1967).

== Singing career ==
Devon released only one professional recording, a single: "I Like the Look" (A side)/"Dreamsville" (B side). Both songs were composed by Henry Mancini and were featured in the film Gunn, Devon's last film. She can be heard on the soundtrack to the 1975 film Mr. Sycamore, performing the song "Time Goes By", written by her then-husband, Maurice Jarre, and lyricist Paul Francis Webster.

== Marriage ==
Devon was married and divorced four times. Her second marriage produced one child, Kevin, born in 1954. Her third husband was actor Brian Kelly, from 1962 to 1966, during which time he was starring in the television series Flipper. In 1967, she married film composer Maurice Jarre and retired from acting. Jarre adopted Devon's then 13-year-old son, giving the future screenwriter and actor his better known name, Kevin Jarre. Devon and Jarre divorced in 1984.

== Later life and death ==
Devon died of heart failure in Beverly Hills on July 19, 2007, aged 76.

== Selected filmography ==
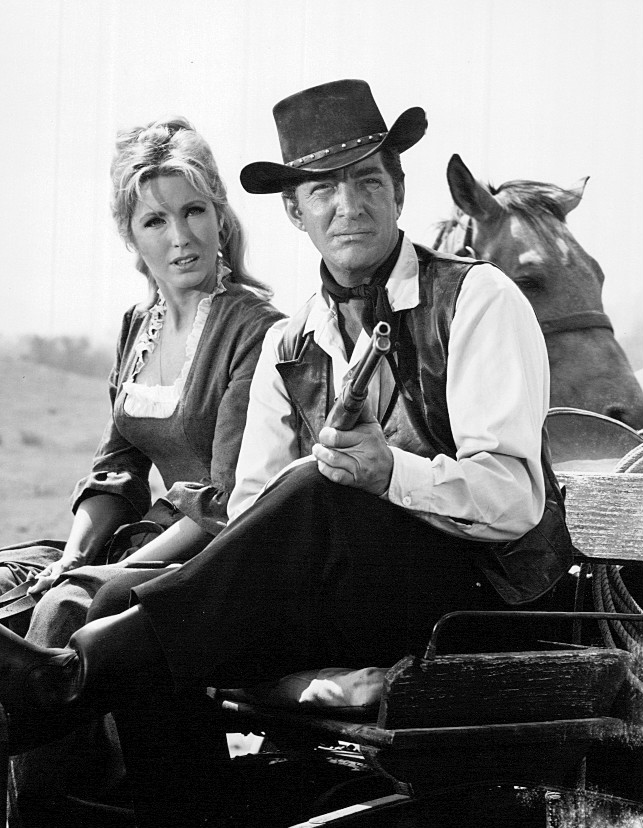
Devon (age 33) and Dean Martin (age 47) in Rawhide (1964).

- The Twilight Zone (1963) (Season 4 Episode 7: "Jess-Belle") as Ellwyn Glover
- The Alfred Hitchcock Hour (1963) (Season 1 Episode 27: "Death and the Joyful Woman") as Kitty Norris
- The Fugitive (1963 TV series) (1966) (Season 3 Episode 23: "The Chinese Sunset") as Penelope Dufour
- Gunn (1967) (film) as Edie Hart
- The Invaders (1967) (Season 1 Episode 11: "The Betrayed") as Susan Carver

== See also ==
- children
  - Kevin Jarre (1954–2011)
- spouses
  - 1950–1951: Peter Kosiba
  - 1951–1961: Cleland Clark
  - 1962–1966: Brian Kelly
  - 1967–1984: Maurice Jarre
