= The After Hours =

- The Twilight Zone episode
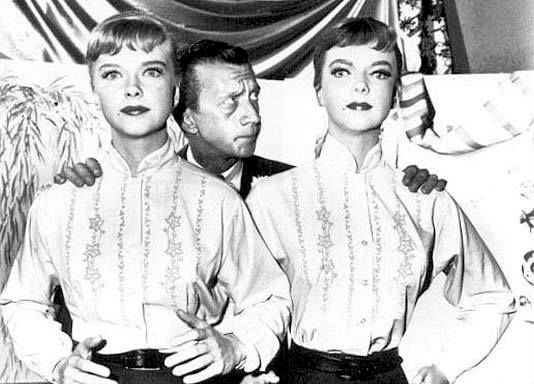
- Publicity photo of (l-r) Anne Francis, James Millhollin and Francis' mannequin double
- Episode no.: Season 1 Episode 34
- Directed by: Douglas Heyes
- Written by: Rod Serling
- Production code: 173-3637
- Original air date: June 10, 1960

Guest appearances
- Anne Francis as Marsha White; Elizabeth Allen as Saleswoman; James Millhollin as Mr. Armbruster; John Conwell as Elevator Man; Patrick Whyte as Mr. Sloan; Nancy Rennick as Ms. Keevers

Episode chronology
← Previous "Mr. Bevis"	Next → "The Mighty Casey"
- The Twilight Zone (1959 TV series, season 1)

"The After Hours" is episode thirty-four of the American television anthology series, The Twilight Zone. It originally aired on June 10, 1960, on CBS.

== Opening narration ==
When Marsha is in the elevator, we hear the first part of the narration:

Express elevator to the ninth floor of a department store, carrying Miss Marsha White on a most prosaic, ordinary, run-of-the-mill errand.

After Marsha exits the elevator, the narration resumes:

Miss Marsha White on the ninth floor, specialties department, looking for a gold thimble. The odds are that she'll find it—but there are even better odds that she'll find something else, because this isn't just a department store. This happens to be The Twilight Zone.

== Plot ==
Marsha White, browsing for a gift for her mother in a department store, decides on a gold thimble. A crowd of people are waiting for the elevator. She notices another elevator is empty. The male elevator operator advises her that thimbles are on the ninth floor. As the elevator rises, the floor indicator shows only eight floors. When Marsha walks out onto the dark, empty ninth floor, a saleswoman leads her to the only item on the floor: a gold thimble. Marsha is puzzled and unsettled by the behavior of the elevator operator and the saleswoman, who knows her name. The saleswoman asks Marsha if she is happy; Marsha responds that it is none of her business and storms off. As Marsha rides the elevator down, she notices the thimble is scratched and dented; the elevator operator directs her to the complaints department on the third floor.

She tells the sales supervisor and the store manager that she bought the item on the ninth floor. They do not believe her, telling her there is no ninth floor. She has no evidence of the transaction as she paid cash, and has no receipt. Marsha then thinks she sees the saleswoman, and is shocked to discover that the figure is actually a display mannequin. While resting in an office to recover from the shock, Marsha is accidentally locked inside the store after hours. Searching for a way out, she becomes alarmed by voices calling to her and by subtle movements made by the mannequins around her. Wandering the floor, she topples the sailor mannequin, whom she recognizes as the elevator operator.

She begins sobbing and flees backward to the now-open elevator, which again takes her to the ninth floor. There she gradually realizes that the "ninth floor" is a storage area occupied by thinking, animated mannequins. With the mannequins' gentle encouragement, she eventually accepts that she herself is also a mannequin. The mannequins take turns, one at a time, to live among humans for one month. Marsha had enjoyed her stay among "the outsiders" so much, she had forgotten her identity and has arrived back a day late. The next mannequin in line — the saleswoman — forgives Marsha for her tardiness and then departs the store to take her turn. As the other mannequins bid farewell to the saleswoman, the sailor asks Marsha if she enjoyed her time among humans; she sweetly and sadly says she did.

The next day, the sales supervisor makes his morning rounds on the sales floor and does a double-take upon passing the Marsha mannequin on display.

== Closing narration ==
Marsha White, in her normal and natural state, a wooden lady with a painted face who, one month out of the year, takes on the characteristics of someone as normal and as flesh and blood as you and I. But it makes you wonder, doesn't it, just how normal are we? Just who are the people we nod our hellos to as we pass on the street? A rather good question to ask . . . particularly, in the Twilight Zone.

== Production notes ==
The head of the mannequin double for Anne Francis was made from a cast of Francis's face done by noted make-up artist William J. Tuttle. Tuttle displayed the mannequin head in the 1968 MGM short film "The King of the Duplicators".

== Remake ==
The episode was remade in 1986 for the first revival of The Twilight Zone. It starred Terry Farrell as Marsha Cole and Ann Wedgeworth as the Saleswoman. The plot is similar, but the emphasis is more on suspense. Marsha is in denial of her identity and wants to be truly human, unlike the Marsha in the original, who simply forgot who she was and accepted her return.

== Graphic novel ==
In 2008, the original episode was adapted as a graphic novel, Rod Serling's The Twilight Zone: The After Hours, written by Mark Kneece and illustrated by Rebekah Isaacs.

== In popular culture ==
In March 2025, the television series Severance aired an episode called The After Hours. This episode, the penultimate episode of season two, offers an homage to the earlier show by referring to Marsha White, a gold thimble, and the specialties department on the ninth floor.
