= Hy Averback =

American actor, producer and director (1920–1997)

- Publicity photo of Hy Averback
- Born: Hyman Jack Averback; October 21, 1920; Minneapolis, Minnesota, US
- Died: October 14, 1997 (aged 76); Los Angeles, California, US
- Occupations: Actor; director; producer
- Years active: 1947–1992
- Spouse: Dorothy Bridges Averback (1949–1997; his death)

Hyman Jack Averback (October 21, 1920 – October 14, 1997) was an American radio, television, and film actor who eventually became a producer and director.

== Early years ==
Born in Minneapolis, Averback moved to California with his family when he was nine years old. Averback graduated from the Edward Clark Academy Theater in 1938 and eventually got a job announcing at KMPC Beverly Hills before World War II.

== Career ==
=== Radio ===
During World War II, as part of the Armed Forces Radio Service (AFRS), he entertained troops in the Pacific with his program of comedy and music, where he created the character of Tokyo Mose, a lampoon of Japan's Tokyo Rose.

After his discharge, Averback's big break came when he was hired to announce the Jack Paar radio show, which replaced Jack Benny for the summer of 1947. From there, he became the announcer for Bob Hope on NBC in September 1948, and announced NBC radio shows The Sealtest Village Store and Let's Talk Hollywood. He announced the Sweeney and March show on CBS in 1948, and became the voice of Newsweek's weekly radio magazine show on ABC's West Coast stations.

Averback was also an actor, appearing a number of times on the Jack Benny radio show, beginning in January 1948.

In 1952, Averback starred in Secret Mission, a transcribed program "dealing with factual stories of escape from behind the Iron Curtain" on AFRS. In 1955 he joined the ensemble cast of Yours Truly, Johnny Dollar, playing multiple character roles in support of leading actor Bob Bailey.

=== Television ===
Doing comedy on early television, he appeared on The Saturday Night Revue (1953–54), Tonight (1955) & NBC Comedy Hour (1956). He was a series regular as Mr. Romero on the Eve Arden sitcom Our Miss Brooks & appeared on I Love Lucy & other 1950s comedies, then moved into directing at the end of the decade. He directed The Real McCoys with Richard Crenna. Crenna had been a cast member with Averback on Our Miss Brooks.

Averback also directed for The Dick Powell Show (1961–1963), Burke's Law (1963-1964), The Man from U.N.C.L.E. (1964–1968), The Flying Nun (1967–1970), Columbo: Suitable for Framing (1971), McCloud (1971), McMillan & Wife (The Face of Murder, 1972), M*A*S*H (1972), Needles and Pins (1973), Quark (1977–1978), the miniseries Pearl (1978), Matt Houston (1982–1983), The Four Seasons (1984), Murder, She Wrote (1985), & The Last Precinct (1986). For CBS, he produced Mrs. G. Goes to College (aka The Gertrude Berg Show) in the 1961–1962 season.

He co-produced the popular 1960s sitcom F Troop and supplied the voice over the loudspeaker heard on the television series M*A*S*H. His actual recording from a Bob Hope show was used in M*A*S*H episode 63, "Bombed," from season 3 where he announces himself as Hope's announcer.

=== Film ===
Averback co-narrated The Story of Life, a 62-minute sex educational film, released by Crusader Productions in June 1948. It featured live action as well as animation by former Walt Disney artists Lester Novros and Robert Moore.

Film credits include his acting as Willard Alexander in The Benny Goodman Story (1956) and directing Chamber of Horrors (1966), Where Were You When the Lights Went Out? (1968), I Love You, Alice B. Toklas (1968), The Great Bank Robbery (1969), and Suppose They Gave a War and Nobody Came (1970) as well as the TV movie The New Maverick (1978) with James Garner and Jack Kelly.

== Personal life ==
In 1969, Averback bought a home in the Racquet Club Estates neighborhood of Palm Springs, California,

He died on October 14, 1997, at age 76, and was buried in Westwood Memorial Park.
