= Summer Love (1958 film) =

1958 film by Charles F. Haas

- Directed by: Charles F. Haas
- Written by: William Raynor; Herbert H. Margolis
- Produced by: William Grady, Jr.
- Starring: John Saxon; Molly Bee; Jill St. John
- Cinematography: Carl E. Guthrie; Clifford Stine
- Edited by: Tony Martinelli
- Music by: Henry Mancini
- Production company: Universal Pictures
- Distributed by: Universal Pictures
- Release date: June 25, 1958 (United States)
- Running time: 85 minutes
- Country: United States
- Language: English

Summer Love is a 1958 black-and-white American musical comedy film directed by Charles F. Haas, written by William Raynor and Herbert H. Margolis, starring John Saxon, Jill St. John, Judi Meredith, and Molly Bee. It was double billed with The Big Beat and is a sequel to the 1956 film Rock, Pretty Baby.

== Plot ==
Jimmy Daley and his bandmates, Mike and Ox, land a performing date at Lake Tahoe, California. His father, a doctor, gives his approval, although he is concerned about Jimmy neglecting his education for music. Joan Wright, his girlfriend, is sorry to see Jimmy leave, but he gives her a bus ticket and invites her to come visit.

To their surprise, Jimmy and Mike discover that Ox has booked the band at a summer camp where the musicians are also expected to work. The band is joined on stage by Alice, a very good singer, while Mike cheers up even more at the sight of beautiful girls in the audience, in particular Erica Landis, whose many admirers accompany her.

Jimmy's in for more surprises. His parents show up, on vacation, bringing along kid sister Twinkie, who's just 14, but eager to begin meeting boys. Joan also arrives, in time to jealously see Erica making a play for Jimmy. Equally envious is Mike, who is head over heels in love with Erica.

Ox falls for Alice, the singer. Twinkie gets a crush on a teenaged horse trainer. As for Jimmy, who has been resisting Erica's aggressive advances, he finally shows an interest in her, whereupon Erica cools off, having made another conquest. Jimmy and Joan patch things up, and the Daleys return home from their summer adventure.

== Cast ==
- John Saxon as Jimmy Daley
- Molly Bee as Alice
- Rod McKuen as Ox Bentley
- Judi Meredith as Joan Wright
- Jill St. John as Erica Landis
- John Wilder as Mike Howard
- George Winslow as Thomas Daley III
- Fay Wray as Beth Daley
- Edward Platt as Thomas Daley
- Shelley Fabares as Twinkie
- Gordon Gebert Tad Powers
- Beverly Washburn as Jackie Bronson
- Bob Courtney as Half-Note Harris
- Hylton Socher as Fingers Porter
- Marjorie Durant as Hilda
- Walter Reed as Mr. Reid

== Production ==
In May 1957 Universal announced they would make a sequel to Rock Pretty Baby with John Saxon and several of the original cast, though not Sal Mineo, who appeared in Rock, Pretty Baby, as he was "too busy".

== Reception ==
It is rated 6.5/10 on the IMDb and 2.5/5 on AllMovie.

== Home media ==
Universal has not officially released Summer Love on DVD or VHS. A few bootleg DVD-R copies of varying quality exist, but otherwise, not much else is known.
