= Edward Platt =

American actor (1916–1974)

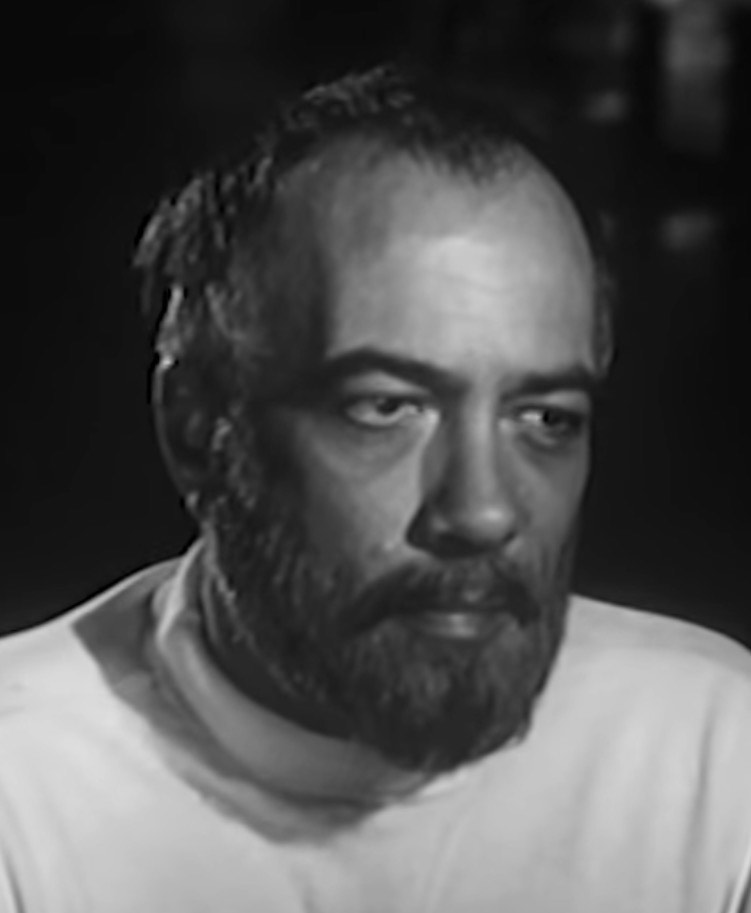
- Platt in The Rebel Set (1959)
- Born: Edward Cuthbert Platt; February 14, 1916; Staten Island, New York, U.S.
- Died: March 19, 1974 (aged 58); Santa Monica, California, U.S.
- Education: Juilliard School
- Occupation: Actor
- Years active: 1941–1974
- Spouse: Suzanne Belcher (m. 1954; div. 1973)
- Children: 4

Edward Cuthbert Platt (February 14, 1916 – March 19, 1974) was an American actor widely known for his portrayal of the Chief in the 1965–1970 NBC/CBS television series Get Smart. With his deep voice and mature appearance, he played an eclectic mix of characters over the span of his career.

== Early life and military service ==
Platt was born on Staten Island, New York. He spent a part of his childhood in Kentucky and upstate New York, where he attended the Northwood School, a private school in Lake Placid, and was a member of the ski jump team. He also studied at the Juilliard School. He attended Princeton University, but left after his first year. He served in the United States Army during World War II. Before becoming an actor, he sang for two years with the Paul Whiteman Orchestra.

== Acting career ==
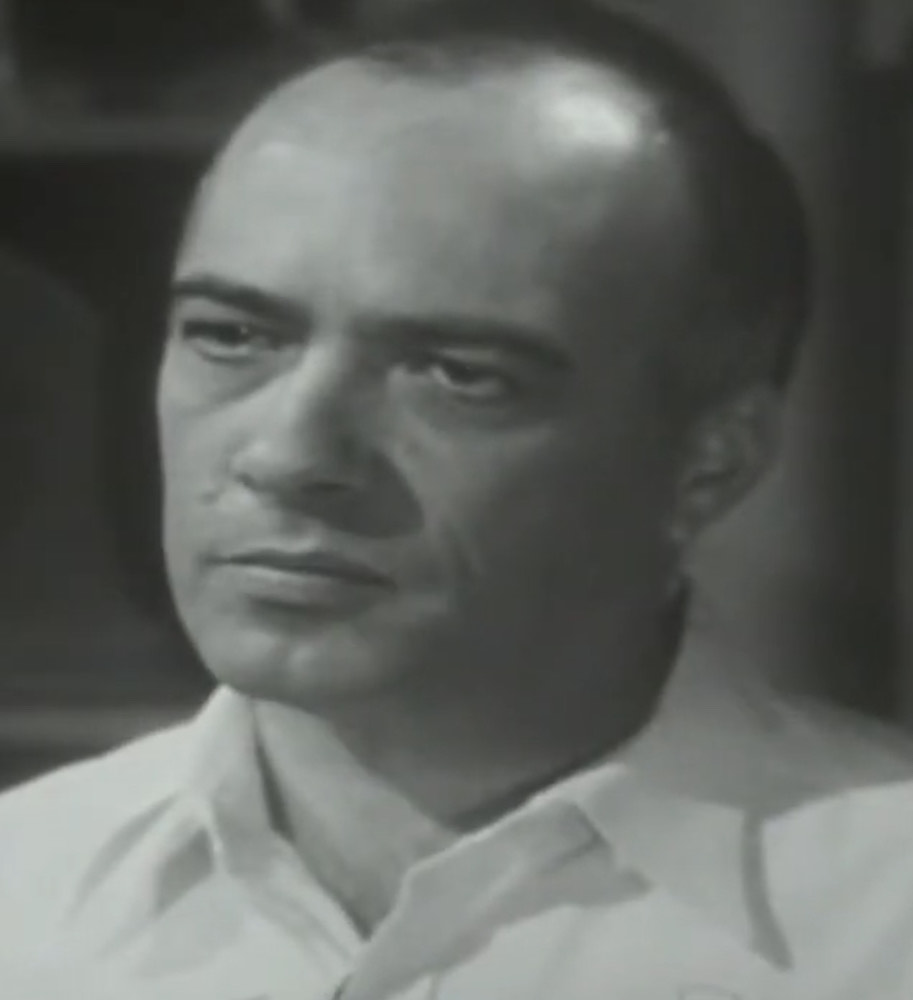
Platt in the TV series Four Star Playhouse (1954)

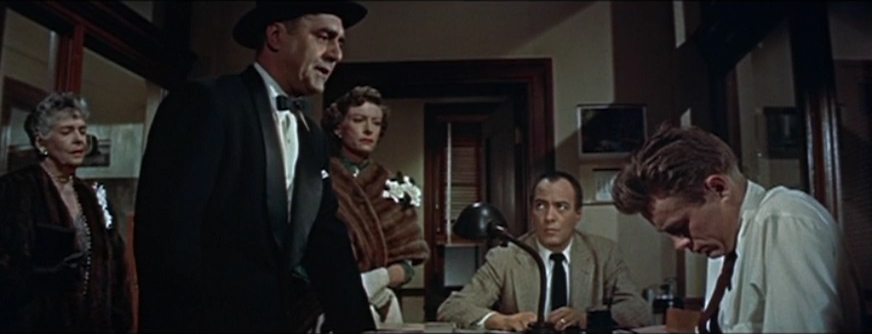
Virginia Brissac, Jim Backus, Ann Doran, Edward Platt and James Dean in Rebel Without a Cause (1955)

An operatically trained bass-baritone (Note: In the Get Smart episode "The Hot Line", Platt sings the French song "Alouette".) with a powerful voice, he debuted on Broadway in the Rodgers and Hammerstein musical Allegro. José Ferrer, who performed with Platt in the Broadway play The Shrike, helped him land his first film role in the 1955 film version. Also in 1955, Platt appeared in Rebel Without a Cause starring James Dean, Natalie Wood and Sal Mineo.In 1957 he had a supporting role in "Designing Woman" with Gregory Peck and Lauren Bacall. He returned to Broadway in 1958 with the musical Oh, Captain!, in a romantic role. In 1959, he played Cary Grant's attorney in North by Northwest, and he starred in the movie The Rebel Set.

Platt also appeared in episodes of the original Perry Mason ("The Case of the Slandered Submarine" and "The Case of the Larcenous Lady"); 77 Sunset Strip, Trackdown, State Trooper (in the episode "Who Killed Doc Robbins"), Men into Space ("From Another World"), Ripcord ("Million Dollar Drop"), Gunsmoke, Bonanza, One Step Beyond, The Rifleman (S5 E7 "The Assailants" as Sen. Bordon 1962), Rawhide, Whispering Smith, The Outer Limits ("The Man with the Power" and "Keeper of the Purple Twilight"), The Dick Van Dyke Show ("A Nice Friendly Game Of Cards"), Voyage to the Bottom of the Sea, Bat Masterson (in the 1959 episode "Incident in Leadville"), Tales of Wells Fargo, The Twilight Zone, and Wagon Train

Platt was widely known for his role as The Chief in the espionage parody television series Get Smart (1965–1970). After it ended, he had a recurring role in the situation comedy series The Governor & J.J. in 1970. He had guest roles in several other television series of the era, mostly comedies, including Temperatures Rising, Bewitched, Owen Marshall: Counselor at Law, Love, American Style, and The Odd Couple as Oscar Madison's boss in the episode "Oscar's New Life".

Platt appeared as Sotto voce in the 1969 KCET television reading of Norman Corwin's 1938 radio play The Plot to Overthrow Christmas.

== Work as producer ==
In 1973, Platt raised the money to produce one of the first independent feature films shot entirely on videotape: Santee, starring Glenn Ford. His crew shot the production with electronic TV cameras and portable video tape recorders, then had the images transferred to film for theatrical release. The movie was not commercially successful.

== Death ==
Platt was found dead in his Santa Monica apartment on March 19, 1974, at the age of 58. Initial reports indicated the cause of death was a heart attack, but Platt's son later said that his father died from suicide after a long struggle with untreated depression.

== Filmography ==
Year	Film	Role	Notes
1949	I Was a Male War Bride	Lieutenant in Gates's Office	Uncredited
1955	Cult of the Cobra	Lamian Threatening Death	Uncredited
1955	The Shrike	Harry Downs	
1955	The McConnell Story	Medical Corps Instructor	Uncredited
1955	Illegal	Ralph Ford	
1955	Rebel Without a Cause	Ray Fremick	
1955	Sincerely Yours	Dr. Eubank	Uncredited
1956	The Lieutenant Wore Skirts	Major Dunning	
1956	The Steel Jungle	Judge Wahller	
1956	Backlash	Sheriff J.C. Marson	Credited as Edward C. Platt
1956	Serenade	Everett Carter	
1956	The Proud Ones	Dr. Barlow	
1956	Storm Center	Reverend Wilson	
1956	The Unguarded Moment	Attorney Briggs	
1956	Written on the Wind	Dr. Paul Cochrane	
1956	Reprisal!	Neil Shipley	
1956	Rock, Pretty Baby	Thomas Daley Sr. M.D.	
1956	The Great Man	Dr. O'Connor	
1957	The Tattered Dress	Ralph Adams	
1957	Designing Woman	Martin J. Daylor	
1957	Omar Khayyam	Jayhan	
1957	House of Numbers	The Warden	
1957	The Helen Morgan Story	Johnny Haggerty	
1957	Oregon Passage	Roland Dane	
1958	The Gift of Love	Dr. Jim Miller	
1958	Damn Citizen	Joseph Kosta	
1958	The High Cost of Loving	Eli Cave	
1958	Summer Love	Dr. Thomas Daley	
1958	The Last of the Fast Guns	Sam Grypton	Credited as Edward C. Platt
1958	Gunman's Walk	Purcell Avery	
1959	The Rebel Set	Mr. Tucker / Mr. T	
1959	North by Northwest	Victor Larrabee	
1959	They Came to Cordura	Colonel DeRose	
1959	Inside the Mafia	Dan Regent	
1960	Cash McCall	Harrison Glenn	
1960	Pollyanna	Ben Tarbell	
1961	The Fiercest Heart	Madrigo	
1961	Atlantis, the Lost Continent	Azar the High Priest	
1961	Snow White and the Three Stooges	Villager	Uncredited
1961	The Explosive Generation	Mr. Morton	
1962	Cape Fear	Judge	
1963	Black Zoo	Detective Rivers	
1963	Johnny Shiloh	General George Henry Thomas	
1963	A Ticklish Affair	Captain Haven Hitchcock	
1964	Shock Treatment	District Attorney	Uncredited
1964	Bullet for a Badman	Tucker	
1965	The Man from Button Willow	The Man in the Black Cape	Voice, Uncredited

== Television credits ==
Year	Series	Role	Notes
1955	Gunsmoke	Mr. Burgess	Season 1 Episode 7: "Smoking Out the Nolans"
1958	Silent Service	Captain Benítez	Episode: "The Last Dive"
1958	Tales of Wells Fargo	Doc Bell	Season 2 Episode 18: "Doc Bell"
1958	Dick Powell's Zane Grey Theatre	Sheriff Galt	Season 2 Episode 14: "Trial by Fear"
1959	Wagon Train	Matthew Sinclair	Season 2 Episode 30: "The Duke LeMay Story" (airdate: April 29, 1959)
1959	Have Gun – Will Travel	Mayor	Season 2 Episode 17: "The Traffetta Mayor" (airdate: January 10, 1959)
1959	One Step Beyond	Will Denning	Season 1 Episode 16: "The Burning Girl" (airdate: May 5, 1959)
1959	Rawhide	Jason Clark	Season 2 Episode 6: "Incident of the Thirteenth Man" (airdate: October 23, 1959)
1959	Mr Lucky	Henry Praiswater	Season 1 Episode 3: "The Stowaway"
1959	Police Station	Desk Sergeant	
1959	Tales of Wells Fargo	Doc Bell	Season 4 Episode 12: "Return of Doc Bell"
1960	Wagon Train	Spinoza de Costa	Season 3 Episode 16: "The Maidie Brant Story" (airdate: January 20, 1960)
1960	Men into Space	Dr. Luraski	Season 1 Episode 29: "From Another World"
1960	Dick Powell's Zane Grey Theatre	Marshall Mays	Season 5 Episode 4: "The Ox"
1960	Perry Mason	Commander Driscoll	Season 3 Episode 23: "The Case of the Slandered Submarine"
1960	Perry Mason	Tom Stratton	Season 4 Episode 12: "The Case of the Larcenous Lady"
1960	Bonanza	Harvey Bufford	Season 1 Episode 17: "The Outcast"
1961	The Twilight Zone	The Doctor	Season 2 Episode 23: "A Hundred Yards Over the Rim"
1961	Boris Karloff's Thriller	Jim Weeks	Season 1 Episode 27: "Late Date"
1961	Alfred Hitchcock Presents	Mr. Henshaw	Season 6 Episode 25: "Museum Piece"
1962	Wagon Train	Cyrus Bolton	Season 5 Episode 34: "The Frank Carter Story" (airdate: May 23, 1962)
1962	Bronco	Sheriff Ben Lockwood	Season 4 Episode 7: "Ride the Whirlwind"
1962	The Rifleman	Senator Jim Bordon	Season 5 Episode 7: "The Assailants"
1962	Tales of Wells Fargo	Doc Bell	Season 6 Episode 34: "Vignette of a Sinner"
1962	Bonanza	Wade Colly	Season 3 Episode 23: "The Guilty"
1963	The Outer Limits	Dean Radcliffe	Season 1 Episode 4: "The Man with the Power"
1963	Bonanza	Will Flanders	Season 4 Episode 15: "The Colonel"
1963	Ripcord	Jake Miller	Season 2 Episode 23: "Million Dollar Drop"
1964	The Outer Limits	Mr. Terrence	Season 1 Episode 28: "The Special One"
1964	The Dick Van Dyke Show	Lou Gregory	Season 3 Episode 18: "A Nice, Friendly Game of Cards"
1964	Kraft Suspense Theatre	2nd patient (Sam)	Season 2 Episode 10: "The Gun"
1964	The Outer Limits	David Hunt	Season 2 Episode 12: "Keeper of the Purple Twilight"
1964	The Virginian	Stuart Brynmar	Season 2 Episode 26: "The Secret of Brynmar Hall"
1964	Petticoat Junction	General Patterson	Season 2 Episode 12: "The Lost Patrol"
1965–1970	Get Smart	Chief of CONTROL	Main cast (137 episodes)
1970	The Governor & J.J.	Orrin Hacker	Season 2 Episode 6: "Fawcett is Running"
1970	The Governor & J.J.	Orrin Hacker	Season 2 Episode 9: "The Making of the Governor"
1970	The Governor & J.J.	Orrin Hacker	Season 2 Episode 10: "A Day in the Life"
1970	The Governor & J.J.	Orrin Hacker	Season 2 Episode 12 "P.S. I Don't Love You"
1970	Bewitched	Jennings Booker	Season 7 Episode 10 Samantha's Old Man
1971	The Odd Couple	Bill Donnelly	Season 1 Episode 21: "Oscar's New Life"
1972	The Snoop Sisters	Julius 'Jules' Nero	Season 1 Pilot Episode: "The Female Instinct"
