= Crime in the Streets =

1956 film by Don Siegel

- Theatrical release poster
- Directed by: Don Siegel
- Screenplay by: Reginald Rose
- Based on: Crime in the Streets; 1955 teleplay on The Elgin TV Hour by Reginald Rose
- Produced by: Vincent M. Fennelly
- Starring: James Whitmore; John Cassavetes; Sal Mineo
- Cinematography: Sam Leavitt
- Edited by: Richard C. Meyer
- Music by: Franz Waxman
- Distributed by: Allied Artists
- Release date: June 10, 1956
- Running time: 91 minutes
- Country: United States
- Language: English
- Budget: $280,000
- Box office: $1,500,000

Crime in the Streets is a 1956 American crime drama film about juvenile delinquency directed by Don Siegel and based on a television play written by Reginald Rose. The play first appeared as an episode of The Elgin Hour directed by Sidney Lumet before being remade as a feature film directed by Don Siegel.

The film, starring James Whitmore and John Cassavetes, also featured actor Sal Mineo, who had previously appeared in Rebel Without a Cause. From his role in Crime in the Streets, Mineo earned a Hollywood nickname, "The Switchblade Kid". Malcolm Atterbury, Virginia Gregg, and future director Mark Rydell had prominent roles.

Siegel adapted the play to a film by expanding some sequences but keeping much of the same cast. His credited dialogue coach on the film was Sam Peckinpah.

== Plot ==
After a rumble between New York City street gangs, the Hornets and Dukes, a youth is taken captive and threatened with a zip gun by Lenny Daniels, one of the Hornets. The act is witnessed by a neighbor, McAllister, who tells the cops.

Lenny is arrested and sentenced to a year in jail. Hornets leader Frankie Dane decides to get even. Seemingly incorrigible, 18-year-old Frankie resists all efforts to get through to him by social worker Ben Wagner or his worried mother, who was abandoned by Frankie's father when he was eight.

Frankie threatens McAllister, who isn't afraid of Frankie. McAllister even slaps him, then walks away. An angry Frankie then enlists friends Lou Macklin and Angelo "Baby" Gioia to assist in killing McAllister, which frightens Frankie's 10-year-old brother Richie, who overhears the plotting.

Baby is slapped by his father who orders, then pleads, with him to stop hanging out with the no-good Frankie. An effort is made by Wagner to understand the boys rather than be angry with them, and Richie tells him of Frankie's plans to commit a murder. Wagner talks to Frankie, seemingly to no avail. The three conspirators go to bed, to later use as their alibi, and wait until the agreed upon time to act. McAllister is trapped in an alley at 1:30 in the morning by the three. Richie stops his brother just-in-time, but ends up with a knife held to his throat by angry Frankie, while McAllister and other two run off, as the intended victim yells for help. Wagner appears due to the commotion, and watches as Frankie finally comes to his senses and lets his brother go. He is then accompanied by Wagner to the approaching police.

== Cast ==
- James Whitmore as Ben Wagner
- John Cassavetes as Frankie Dane
- Sal Mineo as Angelo "Baby" Gioia
- Virginia Gregg as Mrs. Dane
- Malcolm Atterbury as McAllister
- Mark Rydell as Lou Macklin
- Denise Alexander as Maria Gioia
- Peter J. Votrian as Richie Dane

== Television play ==
"Crime in the Streets"
- The Elgin Hour episode
- Episode no.: Season 1 Episode 12
- Directed by: Sidney Lumet
- Written by: Reginald Rose
- Original air date: March 8, 1955

Guest appearances
- Robert Preston as Ben Wagner; Glenda Farrell as Mrs. Dane; John Cassavetes as Frankie Dane; Mark Rydell as Lou Macklin

The original television play aired in 1955.

The play was rejected by several sponsors because it was deemed too sympathetic towards juvenile delinquents. According to Rose, the original title was The Alley but this was changed to Crime in the Streets at the request of The Elgin Hour. Variety said the original title was Delinquent. Rose called the play "the ending of the story rather than a whole story."

Variety wrote "a tightly-written, rawly powerful script by Rose was backed with oné of finest productions of the year. A topflight cast... carried the story across with force and conviction, and Sidney Lumet’s superb direction gave the drama pace, realism and pictorial sweep."

Sidney Lumet called it "an extraordinarily powerful show." Cassavetes called it "a pleasure from end to end."

Reginald Rose felt the television production "was notable for two reasons. First, Sidney Lumet's direction was absolutely electric and lent a relentless drive to the script which never let up for a moment. Second, there were some really remarkable performances given" particularly those from Cassavetes and Rydell.

== Production ==
The success of Marty had led to a boom in film adaptations of television plays and film rights to Crime in the Streets were bought by Allied Artists. Rose was paid $25,000 plus 10% of the profits. He wanted Lumet to direct. Lumet went on to direct another film based on a Rose television play, Twelve Angry Men. Don Siegel had directed a number of films for Allied Artists and the studio asked him to direct the movie version.

The original television script was turned down by the Hollywood Production Code for being too brutal. The script was reworked to get approval. Siegel wrote in his memoirs that he never met Reginald Rose but heard from producer Vincent Fennelly that Rose was unhappy with some changes the director made to the script. Siegel expressed regret he did not meet Rose but insisted "I wasn't going to xerox his teleplay on the theatrical screen and make believe I had a feature."

Production of the film led to the cancellation of another film that was going to be made by Allied Artists from William F. Broidy called Sweet Violence. It was felt the plots of the two movies were too similar.

Filming started 4 November 1955. The bulk of the film was shot on a single set, which Siegel described "a sort of expressionistic view of a New York street designed by Serge Krisman and lighted impressively by cameraman Sam Leavitt." Siegel said the set cost $35,000 but it saved him time in terms of shooting.

Siegel said "I liked the picture, but it came in the wake of a number of good juvenile delinquency pictures such as The Blackboard Jungle and Rebel Without a Cause."

Allied Artists spent $200,000 promoting the film.

== Reception ==
=== Critical ===
Variety called it a "program filler, and mighty dreary one at that... Rose’s highly contrived story, succeeds in making its shock points under Donald Siegel’s pat directorial handling. Plot poses the pitch that the young bums shown here need love and understanding to offset their squalid surroundings. Hgwever, as characterized by story and acting, it’s likely they would be just as unpleasant and unwholesome in any setting because of the psychotic motivations."

=== Box office ===
The film was a box office hit. By September 1956 Variety reported it had made $1.2 million in rentals in North America and $300,000 abroad. According to Variety "Reviews for the most part were so-so and first-run business was spotty. But returns in the subsequent houses were good."

The film had to be re-edited for release in the UK to make it less violent.

== Home media ==
Warner Bros. released the film on DVD on July 13, 2010, in its Film Noir Classic Collection, Vol. 5.

== Notes ==
- Rose, Reginald (1956). "Author's commentary on Crime in the Streets". Six television plays. New York: Simon and Schuster. pp. 249–254.
- Siegel, Don (1993). A Siegel film : an autobiography. Boston: Faber and Faber.
