= Rock, Pretty Baby =

1956 film by Richard Bartlett

- Directed by: Richard Bartlett
- Written by: Herbert Margolis; William Raynor
- Produced by: Edmond Chevie
- Starring: Sal Mineo; John Saxon; Luana Patten; Shelley Fabares; Fay Wray; Edward C. Platt
- Cinematography: George Robinson
- Edited by: Fredrick Y. Smith
- Music by: Henry Mancini
- Production company: Universal Pictures
- Distributed by: Universal Pictures
- Release date: December 1956
- Running time: 89 minutes
- Country: United States
- Language: English
- Budget: "just under $1,000,000"
- Box office: $1,430,000 (US)

Rock, Pretty Baby is a 1956 American comedy musical film directed by Richard Bartlett and starring Sal Mineo, John Saxon and Luana Patten.

== Plot ==
Young musician Jimmy Daley (Saxon) needs to come up with $300 to purchase the electric guitar he wants. He pawns his law books, to the disappointment of his father (Platt), a doctor whose goal is for Jimmy to become a lawyer.

Jimmy's jealous nature results in a ruckus at a party and $150 in damage to a neighbor, which Dr. Daley insists his son pay. His girlfriend Joan Wright (Patten) learns that a battle of the bands has a cash prize. Jimmy and his group end up losing the contest, but he earns the respect of his dad.

== Cast ==
- Sal Mineo as Angelo Barrato
- John Saxon as Jimmy Daley
- Luana Patten as Joan Wright
- Edward C. Platt as Thomas Daley Sr. M.D.
- Fay Wray as Beth Daley
- Rod McKuen as 'Ox' Bentley
- John Wilder as 'Fingers' Porter
- Alan Reed Jr. as 'Sax' Lewis
- Douglas Fowley as 'Pop' Wright
- Bob Courtney as 'Half-Note' Harris
- Shelley Fabares as Twinky Daley
- Susan Volkmann as Carol Saunders
- Caryl Volkmann as Claire Saunders
- April Kent as Kay Norton
- Sue George as Lori Parker
- Walter Reed as Mr. Reid
- Glen Kramer as Bruce Carter
- Johnny Grant as Johnny Grant
- George Winslow as Thomas Daley, III

== Production ==
The film was announced in June 1956, under the title Crazy Love.

Luana Patten had been a child actor then stopped working at age 14 to concentrate on school. After several years she told her agent she wanted to act again and she was cast in Rock Pretty Baby. She signed at $650 a week. The contract had options for another seven years. Universal tried to exercise it and Patten sued to get out of it.

Filming started July 1956. It was also known as The Living End before being titled Rock Pretty Baby.

Before the film came out, Al Daff of Universal said the movie "is not an important picture but it will gross more than many multi million dollar pictures."

== Release ==
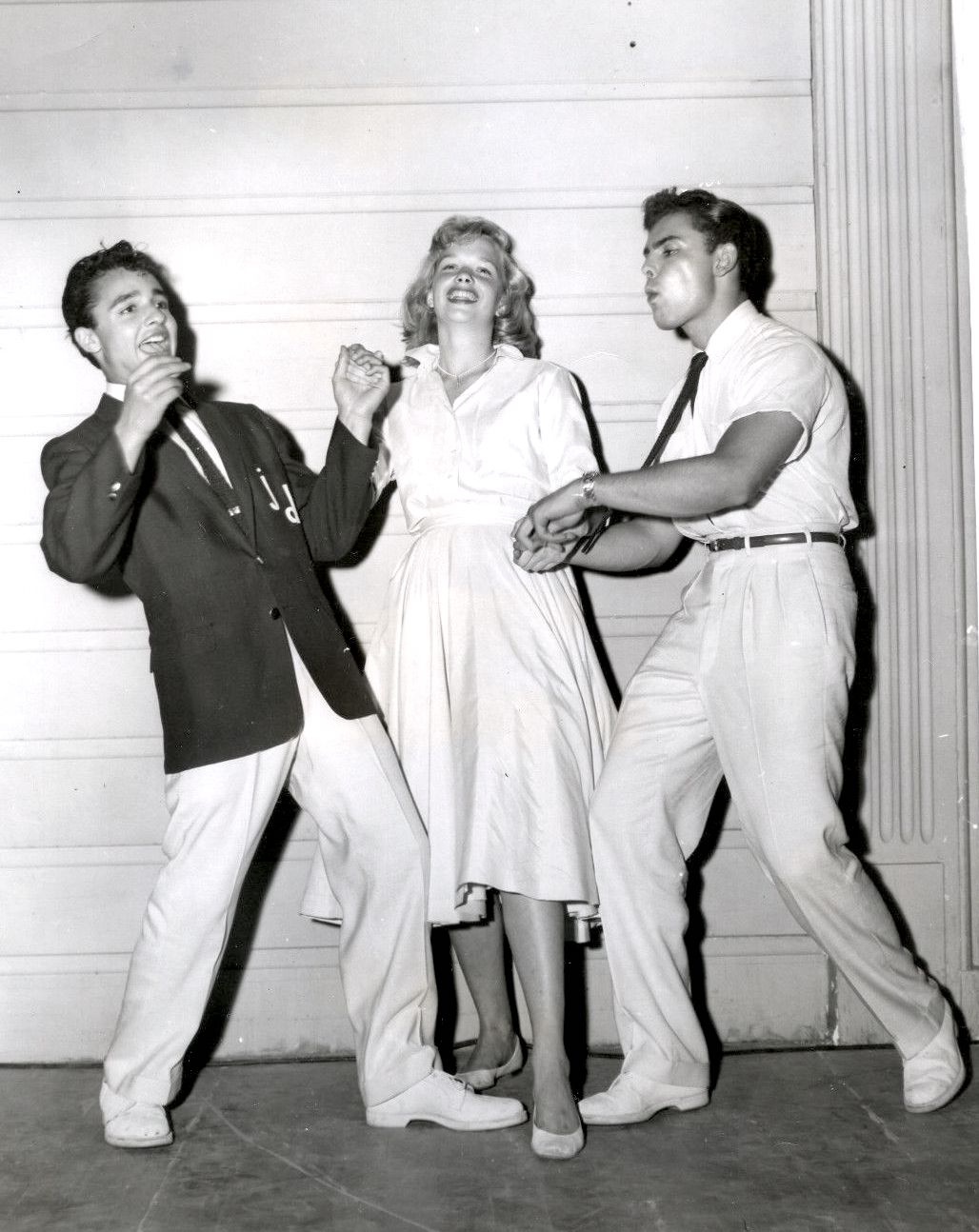
Sal Mineo (left) with Sue George and John Saxon in a publicity still photo.

Sal Mineo and John Saxon were sent out on a promotional tour on the launch of the film.

Universal signed George Winslow to a two picture a year deal over five years on the basis of his performance in the movie.

Variety said it "should emerge a box office winner."

Filmink called it "a jaunty, energetic teen film, with a surprisingly hot late-night beach kissing scene between Saxon and co-star Luana Patten. It became a sleeper hit for Universal."

== Sequel ==
In May 1957 Universal announced they would make a sequel Summer Love.

== See also ==
- List of American films of 1956
