= Blood Salvage =

1990 American comedy horror film

- Directed by: Tucker Johnston
- Written by: Tucker Johnston; Ken C. Sanders
- Produced by: Martin J. Fischer; Ken C. Sanders
- Starring: Danny Nelson; Lori Birdsong; Ray Walston; John Saxon
- Cinematography: Michael Karp
- Edited by: Jacque Freeman Ross
- Music by: Tim Temple
- Production company: High Five Productions
- Distributed by: Magnum Entertainment
- Release date: 1990
- Running time: 98 minutes
- Country: United States
- Language: English
- Budget: $2 million

Blood Savage (later titled Bad Jake) is a 1990 American independent Southern Gothic comedy horror film directed by Tucker Johnston, who cowrote the film's screenplay with producer Ken C. Sanders.

The film focuses on an Atlanta family who are kidnapped on by a psychopathic auto mechanic redneck and his two sons who intends to sell their body parts on the black market.

== Cast ==
- Danny Nelson as Jake Pruitt
- Lori Birdsong as April Evans
- Christian Hesler as Hiram
- Ralph Pruitt Vaughn as Roy
- John Saxon as Clifford Evans
- Laura Whyte as Pat Evans
- Ray Walston as Mr. Stone
- Andy Greenway as Bobby Evans
- Dan Albright as Sheriff Reynolds
- Gil Roper as Emcee
- Evander Holyfield as Boxer

== Production ==
Filming took place on location in and around the city of Fairburn, Georgia in August and September of 1988.

== Reception ==
The film received negative reviews.
