= Agostino (film) =

1962 film

- Directed by: Mauro Bolognini
- Written by: Goffredo Parise
- Produced by: Luigi Rovere
- Starring: Ingrid Thulin; John Saxon
- Cinematography: Aldo Tonti
- Edited by: Nino Baragli
- Music by: Carlo Rustichelli
- Release date: 1962
- Running time: 90 minutes
- Country: Italy
- Languages: Italian; English

Agostino is a 1962 Italian drama film directed by Mauro Bolognini. It was filmed in Rome and Venice. It was the first of many movies John Saxon would make in Italy.

The film is based on a successful short novel of the same name by Alberto Moravia, who had collaborated with Bolognini on his previous film, From a Roman Balcony.

== Cast ==
- Ingrid Thulin as Agostino's mother
- Paolo Colombo as Agostino
- John Saxon as Renzo
- Mario Bartoletti as Saro
