= For Singles Only =

1968 film by Arthur Dreifuss

- Directed by: Arthur Dreifuss
- Screenplay by: Hal Collins; Arthur Dreifuss
- Story by: Arthur Hoerl; Albert Derr
- Produced by: Sam Katzman
- Starring: John Saxon; Mary Ann Mobley; Lana Wood; Mark Richman; Milton Berle
- Cinematography: John F. Warren A.S.C.
- Edited by: Ben Lewis
- Music by: Fred Karger
- Color process: Eastmancolor
- Production companies: Four Leaf Productions, Inc.
- Distributed by: Columbia Pictures Corporation
- Release date: June 5, 1968
- Running time: 91 minutes
- Country: United States
- Language: English

For Singles Only is a 1968 American comedy drama film directed by Arthur Dreifuss and starring John Saxon, Mary Ann Mobley (in her last theatrical feature), Lana Wood, Mark Richman and special guest star Milton Berle.

== Plot ==
Close friends Anne Carr and Helen Todd move into a singles complex where every tenant must be unmarried and under 30.

Jim Allen and Bob Merrick, neighbors of bachelor playboy Bret Hendley, make a wager with him that he can't seduce Anne successfully. Bret is too much a gentleman to accept, but when Anne learns the money would pay for Bret's college education, she willingly goes along with a romance.

Mr. Parker, the building's manager, throws an engagement party for Bret and Anne, then proceeds to evict them from the premises. While they work through their issues, Helen, having endured a traumatic romance with married womanizer Gerald Pryor, goes to the waterfront intending to commit suicide, but is assaulted there by a gang of hoodlums, making her consider giving up men for good.

== Cast ==
- John Saxon as Bret Hendley
- Mary Ann Mobley as Anne Carr
- Lana Wood as Helen Todd
- Mark Richman as Gerald Pryor
- Ann Elder as Nydia Walker
- Chris Noel as Lily
- Marty Ingels as Archibald Baldwin
- Hortense Petra as Miss Jenks
- Charles Robinson as Jim Allen
- Duke Hobbie as Bob Merrick
- Walter Wanderley Trio with Talya Ferro as Themselves
- Cal Tjader Band as Themselves
- Lewis & Clark Expedition as Themselves
- Nitty Gritty Dirt Band as Themselves
- The Sunshine Company
- Milton Berle as Mr. Parker
- Angelique Pettyjohn as woman inquiring about apartment rental (uncredited)

== Production ==
Filming started 18 September 1967. It was a rare comedy role for John Saxon.

== Critical reception ==
A contemporary review in The New York Times by film critic Vincent Canby described the film as "a mindless, witless romantic drama about the mindless, witless young people who live, swim and boogoloo all day in one of those southern California apartment houses restricted to chamois-skinned unmarrieds," adding that the movie "is really an impotent fantasy about the sex life of the young [...] only an elderly movie producer living in southern California could remain alive and yet be so dead to the meaning of the world around him." In her review for AllMovie, critic Sandra Brennan wrote that the film "is basically about the exploitation [of] two naive young women," one of whom "gains firsthand experience with gang rape and suicide."

== See also ==
- List of American films of 1968
