= The Rebel Set =

1959 film by Gene Fowler Jr.

- Theatrical release poster
- Directed by: Gene Fowler Jr.
- Written by: Bernard Girard (writer); Louis Vittes (writer)
- Produced by: Phil G. Giriodi (associate producer); J. William Hayes (executive producer); Kenneth Kessler (supervising producer); Earle Lyon (producer)
- Starring: See below
- Cinematography: Karl Struss
- Edited by: William Austin
- Music by: Paul Dunlap
- Distributed by: Allied Artists
- Release date: 1959
- Running time: 72 minutes
- Country: United States
- Language: English

The Rebel Set is a 1959 American crime drama film in black and white directed by Gene Fowler Jr. It was later featured and riffed on Mystery Science Theater 3000 in Season 4.

== Plot ==
Mr. Tucker, proprietor of a Los Angeles coffee house, hires three down-on-their-luck classic beatnik patrons: out-of-work actor John Mapes; struggling writer Ray Miller; and George Leland, the wayward son of movie star Rita Leland, to participate in an armored car robbery to take place during a four-hour stopover in Chicago during the trio's train trip from Los Angeles to New York. John's worried wife Jeanne joins him on the train, concerned about his not having had a job in more than a year.

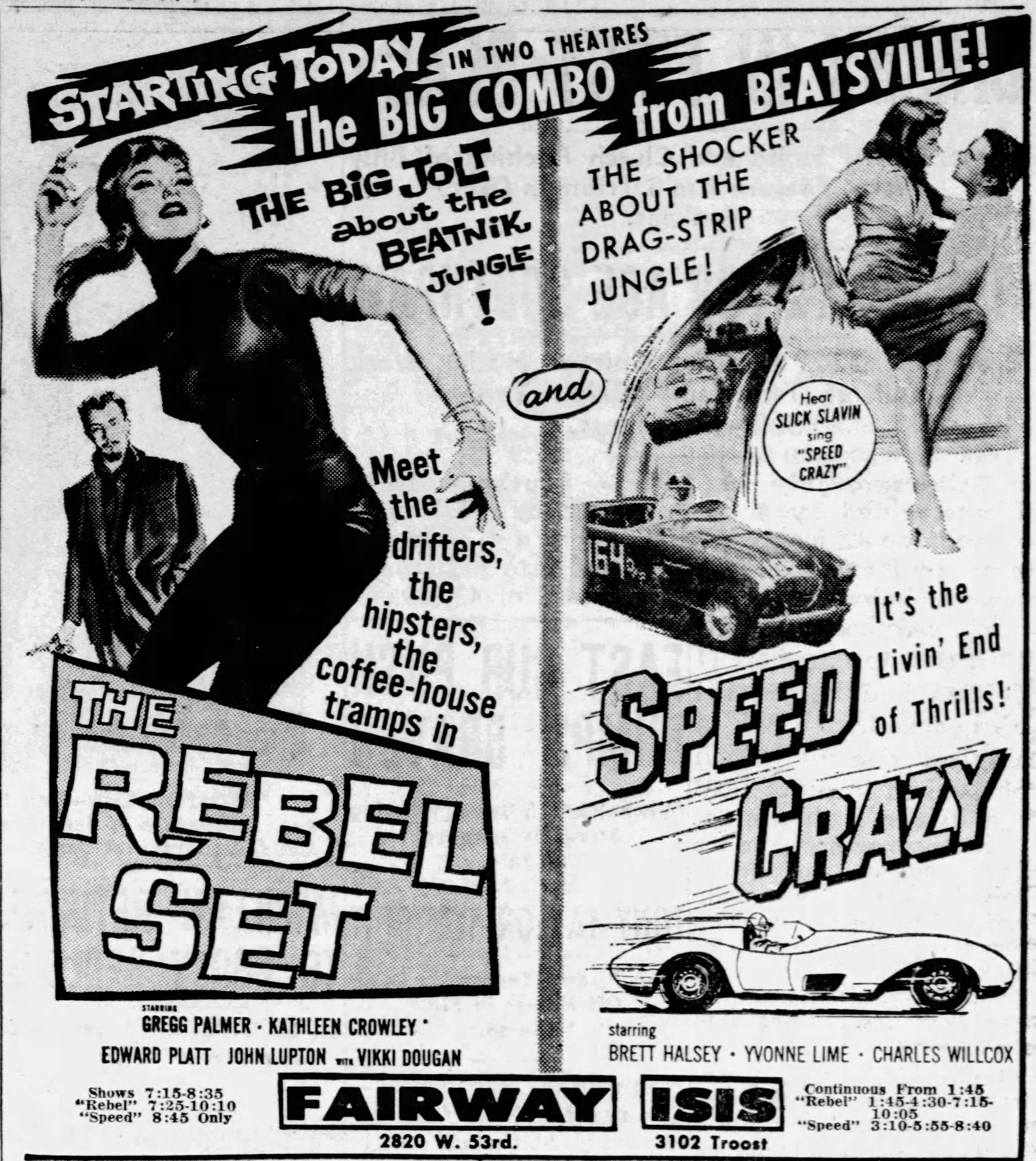
Advertisement from 1959 for The Rebel Set and co-feature, Speed Crazy

Tucker and his henchman Sidney fly ahead to set up the robbery. John, Ray and George take the train to Chicago. George shoots out a tire on the armored truck, then Sidney drives a car into the truck. As the security guards get out to check the accident, John and Ray drive up disguised as policemen in a police car. The three guards are tied up and the money, almost one million dollars, is transferred into the fake police car. The five robbers then drive off to another site to bury their clothes, guns and other crime gear. The money is placed into a gift box and entrusted to George. The men continue on the train to New York. Tucker promised the three $200,000 apiece.

However, once back on the train, George's greed gets the better of him and he decides to keep all of the money for himself. John and Ray go to talk to him but find him murdered with a suicide note left behind. Tucker has boarded the train disguised as a clergyman with a plan to double-cross the trio. Having eliminated George, Tucker kills Ray next, leaving John as the only one left to stop Tucker from getting away with murder and keeping the entire haul.

John reveals to his wife his role in the robbery. When police board the train in Newark to investigate the George's murder, John confesses to them. Tucker jumps from the train with the money, and John chases after him. Two officers follow and fire shots. After fighting with John throughout a railyard, Tucker falls onto an electric transformer and dies. John surrenders to police. As Jeanne gives her husband a goodbye hug, movie star Rita Leland waits for her son George to arrive on the train, unaware that he is dead.

== Cast ==
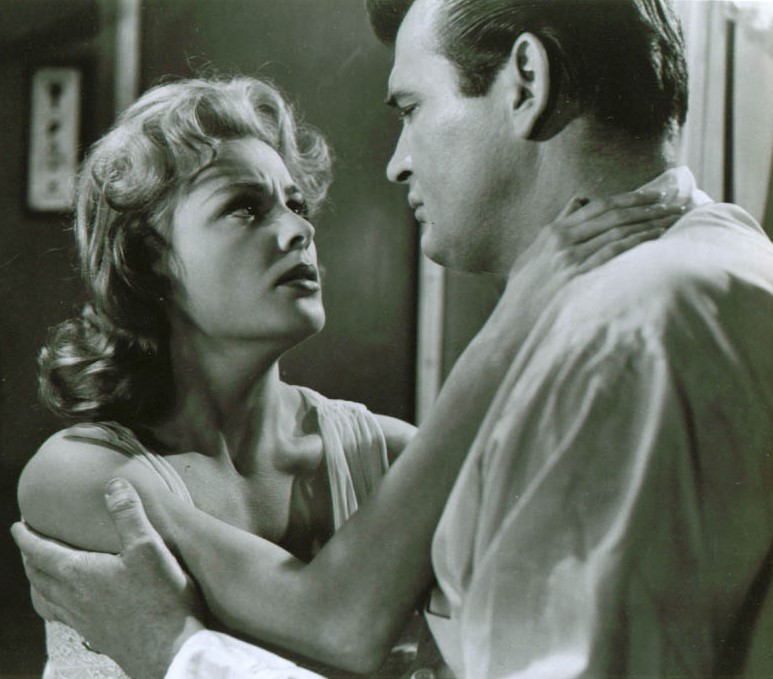
Kathleen Crowley and Gregg Palmer

- Gregg Palmer as John Mapes
- Kathleen Crowley as Jeanne Mapes
- Edward Platt as Mr. Tucker / Mr. T
- John Lupton as Ray Miller
- Don Sullivan as George Leland
- Ned Glass as Sidney Horner
- Collette Lyons as Rita Leland
- Vikki Dougan as Karen, the waitress
- I. Stanford Jolley as King Invader, beat poet
- Barbara Drew as Mrs. Packard
- Cecil Elliott as Train Gossip
- Grace Field as Train Gossip
- Gene Roth as Conductor, New York train
- Robert Shayne as Lt. Cassidy
- Gloria Moreland as Bali Dancer
- Byron Foulger as Conductor, Chicago train

== See also ==
- List of American films of 1959
