= The Unguarded Moment (film) =

1956 film by Harry Keller

- Theatrical release poster
- Directed by: Harry Keller
- Screenplay by: Herb Meadow; Larry Marcus
- Story by: Rosalind Russell
- Produced by: Gordon Kay
- Starring: Esther Williams; George Nader; John Saxon; Edward Andrews
- Cinematography: William H. Daniels
- Edited by: Edward Curtiss
- Music by: Herman Stein
- Color process: Technicolor
- Production company: Universal International Pictures
- Distributed by: Universal Pictures
- Release date: October 3, 1956
- Running time: 95 minutes
- Country: United States
- Language: English

The Unguarded Moment is a 1956 American crime film noir thriller film directed by Harry Keller and starring Esther Williams, George Nader, John Saxon, and Edward Andrews.

== Plot ==
Lois Conway (Williams) works as a music teacher at a local high school in a small town, where recently a woman was found murdered. When she starts receiving notes from an anonymous admirer, she suspects her favorite student Sandy (Wilder) is responsible, and responds that they could never be lovers. The notes grow more violent, and when, in her latest letter, she is invited to meet at the school's lockers at night, Lois decides to visit, hoping to stop the young man. There, she is attacked by an initial shadowy figure, whom she later identifies as Leonard Bennett (Saxon), the high school's star football player.

She successfully gets away, though drops her purse, and is aided by Lieutenant Harry Graham (Nader). Graham advises her to press charges, but Lois wants to drop the matter in hopes of it blowing over. Back at home, she notices her purse on her table, and aware that the thief is in her home, orders him to leave. As he bashes through the door to get away, Lois is now certain that Leonard is her attacker. Leonard is able to get home without his dominant and overbearing father (Andrews) noticing he is gone. Mr. Bennett lectures his son on the dangers of women, stimulated by the occurrence of him being left by his wife and Leonard's mother when he was very ill.

The following day, Lois reports the incident to the principal Pendleton (Tremayne), but when Leonard denies the whole matter, Pendleton protects the school's most valuable athletic asset by suggesting to Lois that she should provide evidence. Soon, the story spreads around school, and with gossip surrounding Lois allegedly pursuing Leonard, both her personal and professional lives become a mess. One day, she pulls him out of class and tries to reason with him, but he refuses to listen to her. Meanwhile, she grows closer to Graham, who does not understand why she is sympathetic to Leonard. Nonetheless, she decides to visit the Bennetts, but the father does not want her to interfere with his son and accuses her of seducing Leonard. He is startled, though, upon finding out the police are now involved in the matter. Mr. Bennett is unaware that Leonard again sneaked out of his room to visit a waitress whom he has dated in the past. Sometime later, Graham accompanies Lois to a football game, where Graham is inspired to retrieve Leonard's fingerprints from his locker. The fingerprints turn out to match those found at Lois's place.

At a school dance, she tries to warn Leonard about the police discovery, assuring him he will get into big trouble if he does not come clean. Leonard, for the first time, speaks truthfully to her, but they are interrupted by Mr. Bennett, who convinces Leonard that Lois is manipulating him. Leonard asks her to meet him in the cloak room to discuss the matter, but Lois is unaware Mr. Bennett and Pendleton are hiding in the same room. Her presence convinces them she must be having an affair with the teenager. Lois, being tricked by Leonard, falls into Graham's arms, and finally allows him to arrest the kid. At the police station, the now suspended Lois is brought in by Graham to get an honest confession from Leonard. During the interrogation, the couple is informed that another man has admitted to having committed the murder. Graham wants to continue prosecuting Leonard for breaking into Lois' apartment, but she wants to drop the case and orders him to bring the boy home.

Back home, Lois is about to undress, when suddenly Mr. Bennett jumps out of her closet and starts assaulting her. At the same moment, Leonard, impressed by having been forgiven by his teacher, confesses to Graham that he wrote the letters and broke into her apartment. Leonard asks to be allowed to walk home to give him time to think, so Graham decides to return to Lois. Arriving at her home, he saw Mr. Bennett escaping and chased him. Bennett runs to his home, finds it locked, and he has no key, so he climbs a trellis to his son's room, but can't open the window, falls onto the patio below, and dies instantly.

== Cast ==
- Esther Williams as Lois Conway
- George Nader as Lt. Harry Graham
- John Saxon as Leonard Bennett
- Edward Andrews as Mr. Bennett
- Les Tremayne as Principal Pendleton
- Jack Albertson as Prof
- Dani Crayne as Josie Warren
- John Wilder as Sandy
- Edward Platt as Attorney Briggs (as Eldward C. Platt)
- Eleanor Audley as Mr. Pendleton's Secretary
- Robert Williams as Detective (as Robert B. Williams)

== Production ==
=== Development ===
The origin of The Unguarded Moment is as surprising as Esther Williams' casting in it. According to biographer Bernard F. Dick in Forever Mame: The Life of Rosalind Russell, the story idea came from writer Larry Marcus and Rosalind Russell, as a possible vehicle for herself. (Marcus had written scripts for Russell's own production company.)

The first draft of the screenplay by Marcus and Russell (under the pseudonym C.A. McKnight, her mother's maiden name) had a working title of Teach Me to Love and was completed by 1951. In a 1951 draft of the story, Harry Graham was a fellow teacher instead of a policeman, and Leonard Bennett was revealed to be responsible for the murders, before being killed.

In 1952, the story, then called The Hidden Heart, was announced to have been purchased by Benagoss Productions, which had made The Green Glove. Herb Meadow had worked on the script and Rudolph Maté was to direct. The story was originally set in France but the setting was changed to California. Possible female stars discussed in the press included Olivia de Havilland, Loretta Young, and Teresa Wright. The movie was not made.

Russell had no time to work on the screenplay, as she became busy with back-to-back Broadway productions, including Wonderful Town, The Girl Rush, and Picnic. As a result, she did not return to the project until 1955, when Marcus and scenarist Meadow had made further revisions to the script under the working titles The Lie and The Hidden Heart.

In October 1955, Universal International announced it had purchased the script, with Gordon Kay to produce. (It was later estimated Russell and Marcus made $50,000 for their work on the film.) In November, Esther Williams signed on to play the lead in the film, by then titled The Gentle Webb (sic).

=== Casting ===
Actor John Saxon had yet to make a name for himself when the film went into production. He received the co-starring role after several screen tests, and the studio attempted to make him fill the void left by actor James Dean's death. For Esther Williams, the film was her first since her contract ended with Metro-Goldwyn-Mayer, and it proved to be her first non-swimming dramatic role since The Hoodlum Saint (1946). In her autobiography, Williams noted:

I thought it was a curious choice for Universal to offer me the lead in a 'dry' psychological thriller, and I wasn't sure the public would accept me without my glittering crowns and sparkly swimsuits. Nonetheless, Universal offered me $200,000, which was more than I ever made for a single film at MGM in or out of the water .... Later, after we had started shooting, Rosalind Russell came up to me at a party and said, 'I hear you're doing my script.' I looked at her blankly until she explained that she had written it under the pseudonym C. A. McKnight. 'I wrote the part for me, but I got too old.'"

== Reception ==
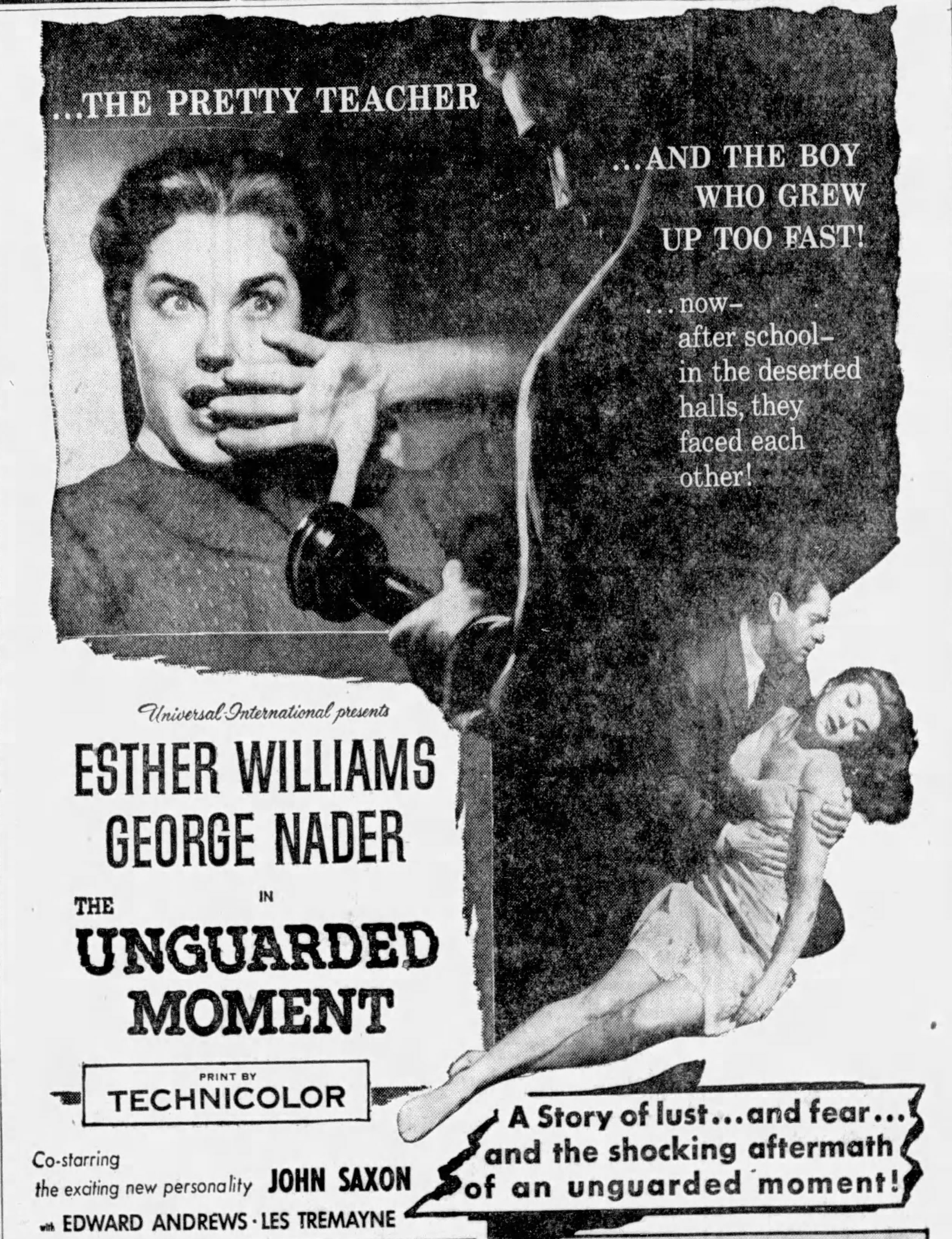
Theatrical advertisement from 1956

The film flopped at the box office. Saxon received warm reviews for his performance as Leonard Bennett. Some reviewers lauded Williams' performance, others lamented her change of milieu. Russell later wrote that Williams was "very good in" the film.

The Chicago Tribune wrote that "the film is a pleasant surprise... the well knit story has suspense and the dialogue is excellent." The Los Angeles Times wrote that "it carries enough suspense to please any but rabid devotees".

The picture has come to be regarded as a B film, despite it originally being as heavily promoted as other studio pictures in the 1950s. According to Turner Classic Movies, Williams "unintentionally accents [her] limitations as a dramatic actress though she still looks gorgeous. [..] While Esther Williams is the top-billed star of The Unguarded Moment, it is Andrews' unexpectedly creepy performance that hijacks the film and imbues it with an underlying mood of malice and menace."

== See also ==
- List of American films of 1956
