= John Saxon =

American actor (1936–2020)

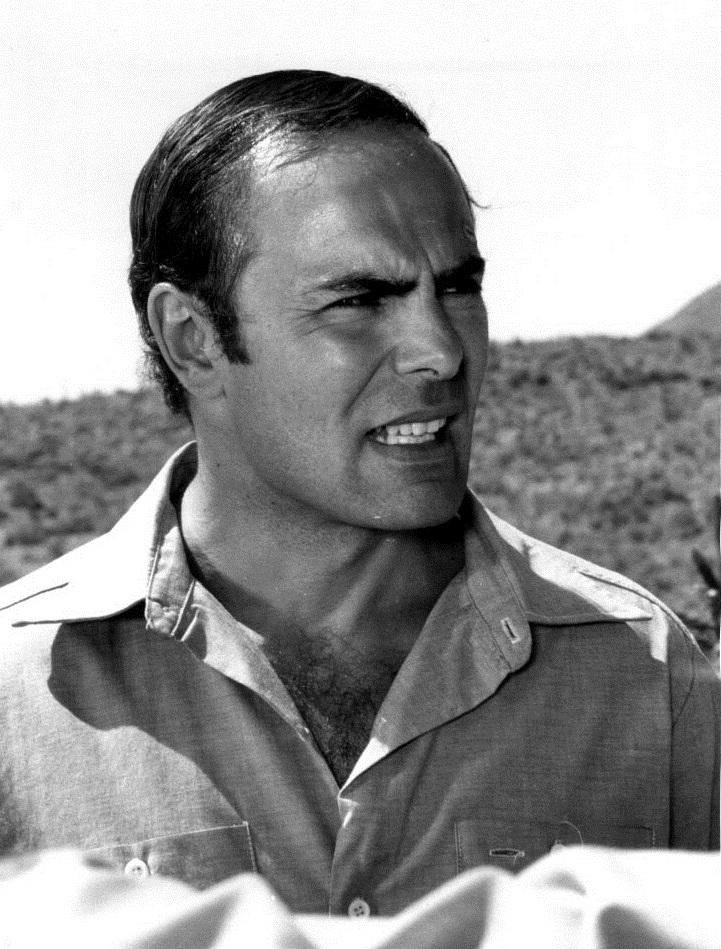
- Saxon in Petrocelli (1975)
- Born: Carmine Orrico; August 5, 1936; Brooklyn, New York, U.S.
- Died: July 25, 2020 (aged 83); Murfreesboro, Tennessee, U.S.
- Resting place: Lake View Cemetery
- Occupation: Actor • martial artist
- Years active: 1954–2017
- Known for: Rock, Pretty Baby; This Happy Feeling; Enter the Dragon; The Appaloosa
- Spouse: Mary Ann Saxon (m. 1967; div. 1979) Elizabeth Saxon (m. 1987; div. 1992) Gloria Martel Saxon (m. 2008–2020)
- Children: 1
- Awards: Golden Globe Award for New Star of the Year - Actor

John Saxon (born Carmine Orrico; August 5, 1936 – July 25, 2020) was an American actor and martial artist who worked on more than 200 film and television projects during a span of 60 years. He was known for his work in Westerns and horror films, often playing police officers and detectives.

Born and raised in Brooklyn, New York, Saxon studied acting with Stella Adler before beginning his career as a contract actor for Universal Pictures, appearing in such films as Rock, Pretty Baby (1956) and Portrait in Black (1961), which earned him a reputation as a teen idol and won him a Golden Globe Award for New Star of the Year – Actor. During the 1970s and 1980s, he established himself as a character actor, frequently portraying law-enforcement officials in horror films such as Black Christmas (1974) and A Nightmare on Elm Street (1984).

Saxon appeared in numerous Italian films from the early 1960s. In a 2002 interview, he said of this period: "At the time, Hollywood was going through a crisis, but England and Italy were making a great many films. Besides, I thought the European films were of a much more mature quality than most of what Hollywood was making at the time." Saxon appeared in Italian productions all through the 1970s and 1980s, until 1994, when he made Jonathan of the Bears.

In addition to his roles in horror films, Saxon co-starred with Bruce Lee in the martial arts film Enter the Dragon (1973), and he had supporting roles in the Westerns The Appaloosa (1966; for which he was nominated for a Golden Globe for Best Supporting Actor – Motion Picture), Death of a Gunfighter (1969), and Joe Kidd (1972), as well as the made-for-television thriller Raid on Entebbe (1977). In the 1990s, Saxon occasionally appeared in films, with small roles in Wes Craven's New Nightmare (1994) and From Dusk till Dawn (1996).

== Early life ==
Saxon was born Carmine Orrico on August 5, 1936, in Brooklyn, New York, into an Italian family. His father, Antonio Orrico, was a New York-born dock worker, and his mother Anna (née Protettore) was an immigrant from Calabria. Italian was his primary language spoken at home, though Saxon also spoke some Spanish. He attended New Utrecht High School in Bensonhurst, and studied acting with famous acting coach Stella Adler. He entered show business as a teenager, when he was spotted by a modeling scout at a movie theatre.

According to Robert Hofler's 2005 biography, The Man Who Invented Rock Hudson: The Pretty Boys and Dirty Deals of Henry Willson, agent Henry Willson saw Saxon's picture on the cover of a detective magazine, where Saxon posed as "a Puerto Rican guy" who gets shot and falls over a garbage can while his girlfriend looks on. Willson immediately contacted the boy's family in Brooklyn. With his parents' permission, the 17-year-old Orrico contracted with Willson, and he was given the stage name John Saxon. He contracted with Universal Studios in April 1954 at $150 a week.

== Career ==
=== Universal Pictures ===
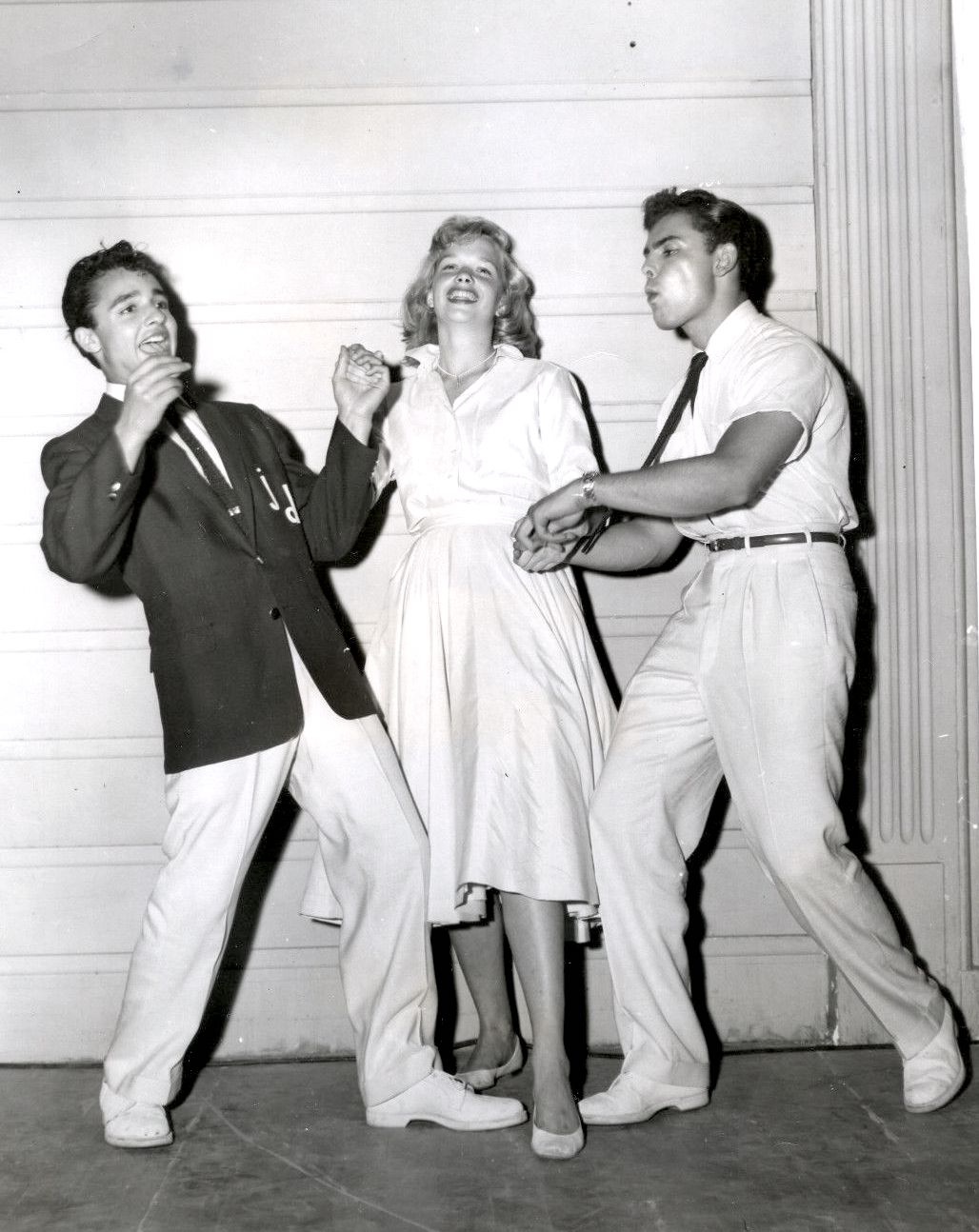
Saxon (right) with Sal Mineo and Sue George in a publicity still photo for Rock, Pretty Baby (1956)

Saxon spent 18 months at Universal before the studio first used him in a film. His first significant role was a juvenile delinquent in Running Wild (1955), co-starring Mamie Van Doren. According to Filmink, "young Saxon had a scowling, broody teen quality that was in fashion in mid-'50s Hollywood."

He was then given a good role in The Unguarded Moment (1956), playing a youth who seemingly stalks Esther Williams. During February 1956, Universal exercised its option on Saxon and he was paid $225 a week.

=== Teen idol ===
Saxon had the lead in a low-budget teen film, Rock, Pretty Baby (1956), which became an unexpected success and established Saxon as a teen idol. Universal executives were pleased, and Ross Hunter announced he would be in Teach Me How To Cry. Saxon quickly reprised his Rock, Pretty Baby role in a sequel, Summer Love (1958). By this time, he was getting about 3,000 fan letters a week. He then made Teach Me How to Cry with Sandra Dee, which was retitled The Restless Years (1958).

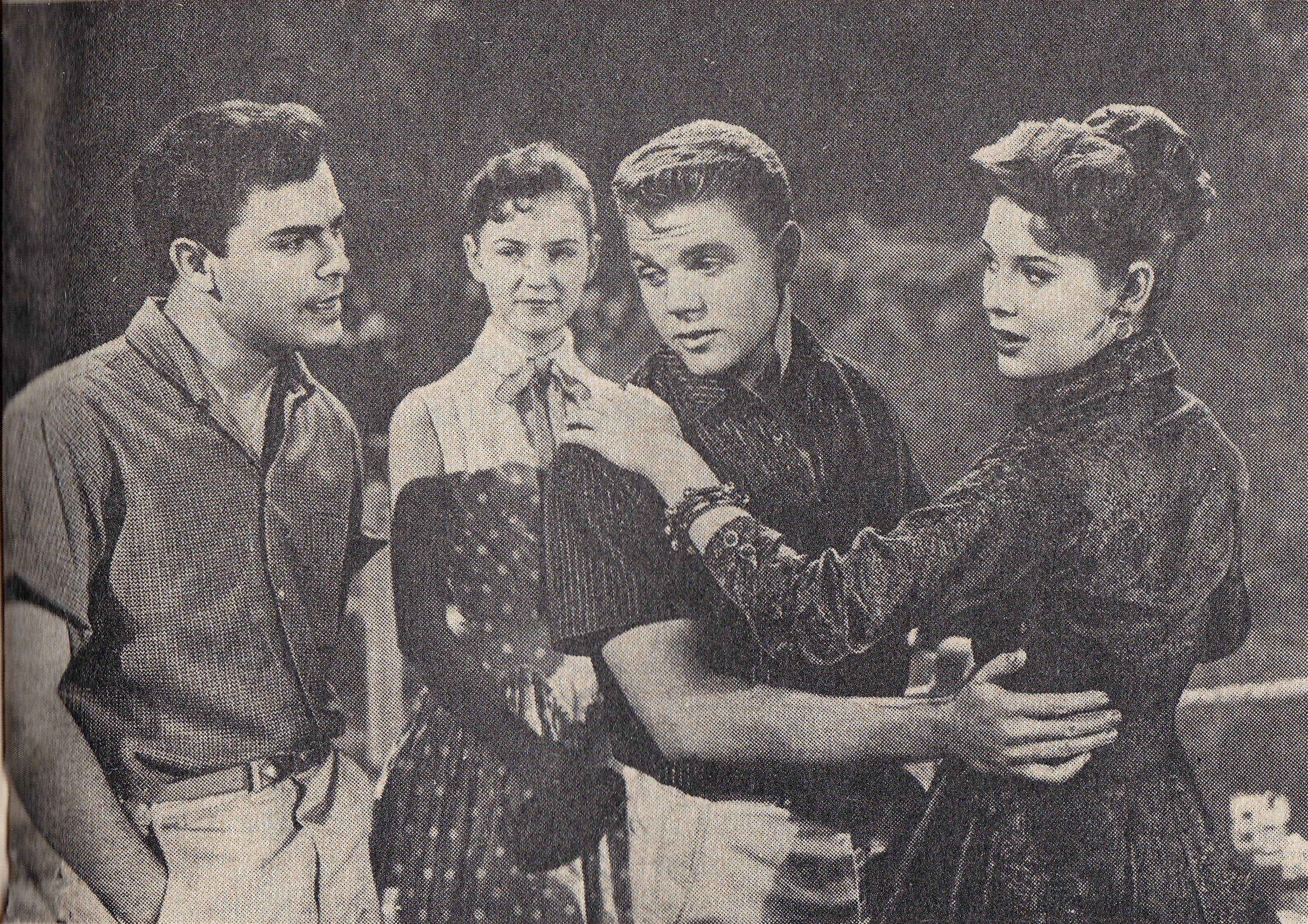
John Saxon, Shelley Fabares, John Wilder and Jill St. John in Summer Love (1958)

Universal put him in an "A" film, This Happy Feeling (1958), directed by Blake Edwards, where Saxon romanced Debbie Reynolds in support of Curt Jurgens. MGM borrowed him to appear opposite Sandra Dee in The Reluctant Debutante (1958), for director Vincente Minnelli, which was widely seen. Saxon was billed third, beneath Rex Harrison and Kay Kendall. He had a support role in a large-budget Biblical drama about Simon Peter, The Big Fisherman (1959) for director Frank Borzage, starring Howard Keel. Released by Buena Vista instead of Universal-International, it was a financial disappointment.

In August 1958, Saxon signed a three-picture deal with Hecht-Hill-Lancaster, the first of which was to be the main role in Cry Tough (1959), a film about juvenile delinquents. He was meant to follow it with The Ballad of Cat Ballou (not made until years later, with Jane Fonda). Instead, for HHL, he worked with another major director, John Huston, in the Western The Unforgiven (1960), playing an Indian in support of Burt Lancaster and Audrey Hepburn. Back at Universal, he remained in a supporting role for Portrait in Black (1960), reunited with Dee, with Lana Turner and Anthony Quinn.

He appeared in the Western Posse from Hell (1961) with Audie Murphy and guest-starred in television series, including General Electric Theater and The Dick Powell Theatre. "I want to do all sorts of character parts," he said in 1960.

Saxon played a serial-killer soldier in War Hunt (1962) and had a small role in the comedy success Mr. Hobbs Takes a Vacation (1962).

=== Europe ===
Saxon traveled to Italy to make Agostino (1962).

In 1963, Saxon co-starred with Letícia Román in Mario Bava's Italian giallo film The Girl Who Knew Too Much.

He returned to Hollywood to perform in Otto Preminger's The Cardinal (1963) and an episode of Bob Hope Presents the Chrysler Theatre, then was back to Europe for The Cavern (1964).

The Ravagers (1965) was shot in the Philippines; Night Caller from Outer Space (1965) was a science-fiction film shot in Britain.

In 1966, he starred in Curtis Harrington's science-fiction/horror classic Queen of Blood with Basil Rathbone and Dennis Hopper, then appeared opposite Marlon Brando in The Appaloosa (1966), winning a Golden Globe Best Supporting Actor nomination for his portrayal of a Mexican bandit. Saxon recalls, "This was to me a terrific role and something I was ready for, but he [Brando] was despondent. He said he had lent a whole bunch of money to his father, and what he was saying to me was that his father ruined his life by losing all of his money. He was kind of bored in the picture."

The Doomsday Flight (1966) was a made-for-television film. In an interview in 1966, he said, "I never felt comfortable being a teenage dreamboat... I regard myself as a craftsman."

He portrayed Marco Polo in episode 26 of The Time Tunnel ("Attack of the Barbarians"), originally broadcast on March 10, 1967, and was a guest actor on Bonanza in 1967 ("The Conquistadores"). In episode 19, season 5 of The Virginian ("The Modoc Kid") Saxon appeared in the title role alongside Harrison Ford, who was appearing in one of his first speaking roles. And in 1969 he appeared in Bonanza again ("My Friend, My Enemy").

Saxon was in a sex comedy for Sam Katzman, For Singles Only (1968), and appeared in some Westerns, One Dollar Too Many (1968), Death of a Gunfighter (1969), The Men from Shiloh (rebranded name for The Virginian, 1971), and Joe Kidd (1972) (again playing a Mexican, this time a revolutionary named Luis Chama). I Kiss the Hand (1973) was a thriller made in Italy.

He spent three years playing Dr. Theodore Stuart for the television series The Bold Ones: The New Doctors (1969–1972).

=== Enter the Dragon and 1970s ===
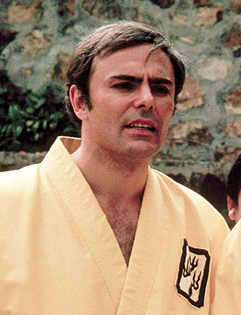
Saxon in Enter the Dragon (1973)

Saxon, who had practiced martial arts since 1957, appeared as the martial artist Roper in 1973's Enter the Dragon. It was Bruce Lee's first major role in a Hollywood feature. He almost backed out of Enter the Dragon, on account of the script being too light. "It was a 60-page treatment", said Saxon in a 2002 interview. "I thought: there's not enough to act here. A stunt man could play it. But they talked me into it, saying they would work in my suggestions. Some things they shot and kept in the film, but most of it they discarded." After Enter the Dragon, Saxon had no further interest in appearing in martial-arts films.

He was in such action films as Mitchell (1975), The Swiss Conspiracy (1975), Strange Shadows in an Empty Room (1976), Violent Naples (1976), Mark Strikes Again (1976), A Special Cop in Action (1976), Cross Shot (1976), and The Cynic, the Rat and the Fist (1977).

In 1974, he appeared as police Lieutenant Fuller in the slasher horror film Black Christmas. From 1974 to 1976, he appeared in The Six Million Dollar Man, first as Major Frederick Sloan and then as Nedlick. This role also extended into The Bionic Woman. The actor's likeness was later used for the Kenner action-figure doll called "Maskatron" that was based on the series.

Saxon starred as Dylan Hunt in the 1974 Gene Roddenberry television pilot Planet Earth, replacing Alex Cord from Genesis II. A 20th-century scientist unfrozen in the postnuclear world of 2133, he leads a team of explorers and encounters a matriarchal society. Although ABC declined the series, Saxon played a nearly identical character in the 1975 television film Strange New World.

In 1976, Saxon portrayed a homicidal vampire-like strangler in the season-two Starsky & Hutch episode "Vampire". He played Captain Radl in the two-part Wonder Woman episode "The Feminum Mystique" (1976). Also in 1976, he appeared in an episode of The Rockford Files titled "A Portrait of Elizabeth", in which he played a crooked corporate lawyer and painter named Dave Delaroux, who was involved in a securities rip-off and with whom Rockford's attorney Beth Davenport was smitten. In this episode, Saxon was able to display his considerable martial-arts abilities in two fight scenes. Raid on Entebbe (1977) was a prestige television movie for him. Moonshine County Express was a big success for Roger Corman's New World Pictures; Saxon made another film for that company, The Bees (1978). He appeared in a Bollywood movie, Shalimar (1978), then it was back to exploitation: Fast Company (1979) and The Glove (1979).

Saxon played Hunt Sears, chief of a breakfast-cereal conglomerate, opposite Robert Redford and Jane Fonda in the 1979, Oscar-nominated film The Electric Horseman.

=== 1980s–1990s ===
He appeared in the 1982 television movie Rooster, and he was an occasional celebrity guest on the short-lived game show Whew!, including during the series' final week. His extensive television credits include two years as Tony Cumson on Falcon Crest (1982, 1986–1988) and the recurring role of Rashid Ahmed on Dynasty (1982–84). He appeared twice (in different roles) on The A-Team, in 1983 and 1985.

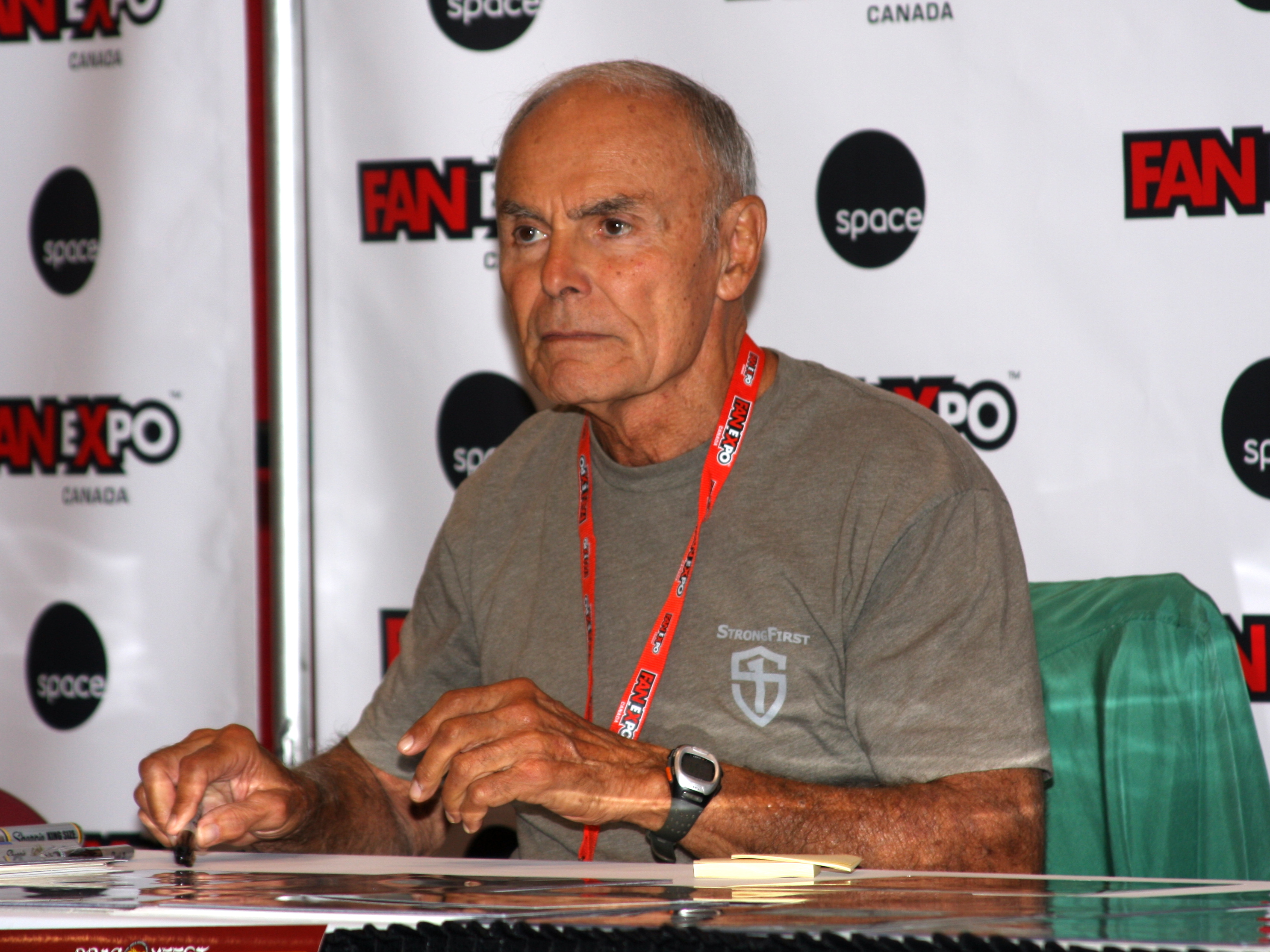
Saxon at the 2014 Fan Expo Canada.

Saxon played in Dario Argento's Tenebrae (1982) as the writer hero's shifty agent; in Battle Beyond the Stars (1980) as Sador; in Cannibal Apocalypse (1980) where he played a Vietnam veteran tormented because his worthless pal bit him and years later, he is starting to get the urge to do the same; in Prisoners of the Lost Universe as an alternate-universe warlord, and in Wes Craven's A Nightmare on Elm Street (1984) as the heroine's (Nancy Thompson's) father. He reprised his role in A Nightmare on Elm Street 3: Dream Warriors (1987) and Wes Craven's New Nightmare (1994) as he played himself in a dual role.

He made his directorial debut in 1987 with the horror film Zombie Death House, which starred Dennis Cole and Anthony Franciosa. Filmink wrote, "Few other actors of his generation have as fine a track record in" horror movies. "Why did he appear in so many? I guess for starters he was willing – he wasn't snobby. He made a good on-screen cop and there's always roles for a cop actor in a slasher film. He could also seem scary so made an excellent red herring/villain."

He starred in Blood Salvage (1990) as Clifford Evans, Maximum Force (1992) as Captain Fuller, and also appeared in From Dusk till Dawn (1996).

=== Later career ===
In his later years, Saxon continued to appear mostly in independent films and appeared in several television series. He had a notable guest part in "Grave Danger", the fifth-season finale of CSI: Crime Scene Investigation, which was directed by From Dusk till Dawn screenwriter and star Quentin Tarantino. Saxon starred in the episode opposite fellow cult film luminary Andrew Prine. He also appeared in an episode ("Pelts") of the anthology horror series Masters of Horror, which reunited him with Tenebrae director Dario Argento.

Saxon was a regular guest at horror- and cult-film conventions, including the Creation Entertainment – Weekend of Horrors 2010 on May 21, 2010, in Los Angeles. His last acting role was in the film Bring Me the Head of Lance Henriksen, which as of his death was in postproduction.

== Personal life ==
John Saxon was married three times. His first marriage was to Mary Ann Saxon, a screenwriter and television director of development. His second wife was Elizabeth (Phillips) Saxon, a former investment banker, airline union negotiator, and psychologist. John Saxon's third and last wife was Gloria (Potts) Martel Saxon, a model and esthetician. He and Mary Ann had a son, Antonio. He was a Democrat.

Saxon held a brown belt in Shotokan karate, having studied under Hidetaka Nishiyama, and was also proficient in Judo.

== Death ==
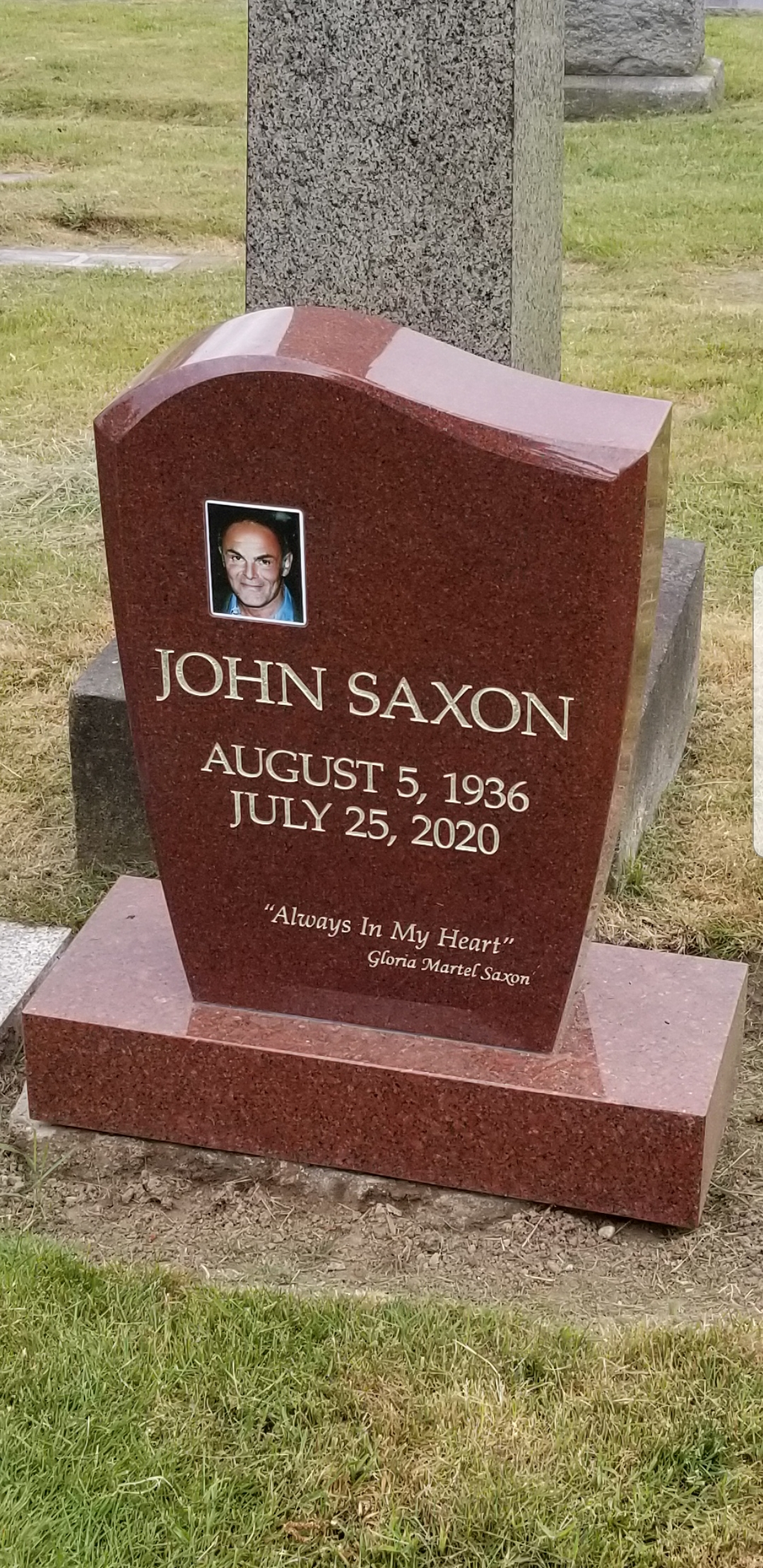
Saxon's gravesite in Lake View Cemetery, Seattle

Saxon died of complications from pneumonia, on July 25, 2020, aged 83, in Murfreesboro, Tennessee, a city about 35 miles (56 km) southeast of Nashville, where he had resided for several years. He was interred at Lake View Cemetery in Seattle, Washington, near his former co-star Bruce Lee.

== Filmography ==
=== Film ===
Year	Title	Role	Notes
1954	It Should Happen to You	Boy Watching Argument in Park	Uncredited
1954	A Star Is Born	Movie Premiere Usher	Uncredited
1955	Running Wild	Vince Pomeroy	
1956	The Unguarded Moment	Leonard Bennett	
1956	Rock, Pretty Baby	Jimmy Daley	
1957	Summer Love	Jimmy Daley	
1958	This Happy Feeling	Bill Tremaine	
1958	The Reluctant Debutante	David Parkson	
1958	The Restless Years	Will Henderson	
1959	Cry Tough	Miguel Antonio Enrico Francisco Estrada	
1959	The Big Fisherman	Prince Voldi	
1960	The Unforgiven	Johnny Portugal	
1960	Portrait in Black	Blake Richards	
1960	The Plunderers	Rondo	
1961	Posse from Hell	Seymour Kern	
1962	War Hunt	Private Raymond Endore	
1962	Mr. Hobbs Takes a Vacation	Byron Grant	
1962	Agostino	Renzo	
1963	The Girl Who Knew Too Much	Dr. Marcello Bassi	
1963	The Cardinal	Benny Rampell	
1964	The Cavern	Private Joe Cramer	
1965	The Ravagers	Captain Kermit Dowling	
1965	The Night Caller	Dr. Jack Costain	
1966	Queen of Blood	Allan Brenner	
1966	The Appaloosa	Chuy Medina	
1968	For Singles Only	Bret Hendley	
1968	One Dollar Too Many	Clay Watson	
1969	Death of a Gunfighter	Lou Trinidad	
1971	Mister Kingstreet's War	Jim Kingstreet	
1972	House Made of Dawn	Tosamah	
1972	Joe Kidd	Luis Chama	
1973	I Kiss the Hand	Gaspare Ardizzone	
1973	Enter the Dragon	Roper	
1974	Black Christmas	Lieutenant Ken Fuller	
1974	Planet Earth	Dylan Hunt	
1975	Metralleta 'Stein'	Mariano Beltrán	
1975	Mitchell	Walter Deaney	
1976	The Swiss Conspiracy	Robert Hayes	
1976	Strange Shadows in an Empty Room	Sergeant Ned Matthews	
1976	Violent Naples	Francesco Capuano	
1976	Mark Strikes Again	Inspector Altman	
1976	A Special Cop in Action	Jean Albertelli	
1976	Cross Shot	Commissioner Jacovella	
1977	The Cynic, the Rat and the Fist	Frank Di Maggio	
1977	Moonshine County Express	J.B. Johnson	
1977	Tre soldi e la donna di classe	Unknown	Unfinished
1978	The Bees	John Norman	
1978	Shalimar	Colonel Columbus	
1979	Fast Company	Phil Adamson	
1979	The Glove	Sam Kellog	
1979	The Electric Horseman	Hunt Sears	
1980	Beyond Evil	Larry Andrews	
1980	Cannibal Apocalypse	Norman Hopper	
1980	Battle Beyond the Stars	Sador	
1980	Running Scared	Captain Munoz	
1981	Blood Beach	Captain Pearson	
1982	Wrong Is Right	Homer Hubbard	
1982	Una di troppo	Sergio Puccini, The Notary	
1982	The World of Martial Arts	Self - Narrator (Voice)	Documentary
1982	The Scorpion with Two Tails	Arthur Barnard	
1982	Tenebrae	Peter Bullmer	
1982	Desire	Joe Hale	
1983	Prisoners of the Lost Universe	Kleel	
1983	The Big Score	Davis	
1984	A Nightmare on Elm Street	Lieutenant Donald Thompson	
1985	Fever Pitch	The Sports Editor	
1986	Hands of Steel	Francis Turner	
1987	A Nightmare on Elm Street 3: Dream Warriors	Donald Thompson	
1988	Death House	Colonel Gordon Burgess	Also director
1989	Criminal Act	Herb Tamplin	
1989	My Mom's a Werewolf	Harry Thropen	
1989	Nightmare Beach	Chief Strycher	
1990	Aftershock	Oliver Quinn	
1990	Deadliest Art: Best of the Martial Arts Films	Self - Host	Documentary
1990	The Last Samurai	Haroun Al-Hakim	
1990	The Final Alliance	Ghost	
1990	Crossing the Line	Jack Kagan	
1990	Blood Salvage	Clifford Evans	
1991	The Arrival	Agent Mills	
1992	Maximum Force	Captain Fuller	
1992	Hellmaster	Professor Jones	
1992	Genghis Khan	Chiledu	Unfinished
1993	The Baby Doll Murders	John Maglia	
1993	No Escape No Return	James Mitchell	
1993	Jonathan of the Bears	Fred Goodwin	
1994	Beverly Hills Cop III	Orrin Sanderson	
1994	Killing Obsession	Dr. Sachs	
1994	Wes Craven's New Nightmare	Himself / Donald Thompson	
1994	Frame-Up II: The Cover-Up	Charles Searage	
1996	From Dusk till Dawn	FBI Agent Stanley Chase	Cameo appearance
1997	The Killers Within	Detective Lewis	
1997	Lancelot: Guardian of Time	Wolvencroft	
1998	The Party Crashers	Mr. Foster	
1998	Joseph's Gift	Jacob Keller	
1998	Criminal Minds	Antonio DiPaolo Jr.	
2001	Final Payback	Police Chief George Moreno	
2001	Night Class	Murphy	
2002	Outta Time	James Darabont	
2003	The Road Home	Michael Curtis	
2006	The Craving Heart	Richard Tom	
2006	Trapped Ashes	Leo	Segment: "Stanley's Girlfriend"
2008	God's Ears	Lee Robinson	
2009	Old Dogs	Paul	
2009	The Mercy Man	Father McMurray	
2010	Genghis Khan: The Story of a Lifetime	Chiledu	
2010	Bring Me the Head of Lance Henriksen	John	
2014	Roger	Unknown	Short
2015	The Dentros	George Dentros	Short
2017	The Extra	Victor Vallient	

=== Television ===
Year	Title	Role	Notes
1955	Medic	Danny Ortega	— "Walk with Lions"
1961	General Electric Theater	Martin Glass	— "Cate in the Cradle"
1962	The Dick Powell Theatre	Nick Giller	— "A Time to Die"
1963–1964	Burke's Law	Gil Lynch / Bud Charney	2 episodes — "Who Killed Cable Roberts" (1963) — "Who Killed the Horne of Plenty?" (1964)
1964	Another World	Edward Gerard #1	(8/30/1985–2/26/1986)
1964–1966	Bob Hope Presents the Chrysler Theatre	Mario Silvetti / Augie	2 episodes — "Echo of Evil" (1964) — "After the Lion, Jackals" (1966)
1965–1975	Gunsmoke	Gristy Calhoun / Pedro Manez / Virgil Stanley / Cal Strom Jr. / Dingo	5 episodes — "Dry Road to Nowhere" (1965) — "The Avengers" (1965) — "The Whispering Tree" (1966) — "The Pillagers" (1967) — "The Squaw" (1975)
1966	Dr. Kildare	Richard Ross	2 episodes — "The Art of Taking a Powder" — "Read the Book and Then See the Picture"
1966	The Doomsday Flight	George Ducette	Television film
1967	The Time Tunnel	Marco Polo	— "Attack of the Barbarians"
1967	Winchester 73	Dakin McAdam	Television film
1967	Cimarron Strip	Screamer	— "Journey to a Hanging"
1967	Garrison's Gorillas	Janus	— "20 Gallons to Kill"
1967–1969	Bonanza	Chief Jocova / Blas / Steven Friday	3 episodes — "Black Friday" (1967) — "The Conquistadores" (1967) — "My Friend, My Enemy" (1969)
1967–1970	Ironside	Eric Saginor / Carter	2 episodes — "An Inside Job" (1967) — "Ransom" (1970)
1967–1971	The Virginian	Sergeant Terence Mulcahy / Ben Oakes / Dell Stetler	3 episodes — "The Modoc Kid" (1967) — "Vision of Blindness" (1968) — "The Regimental Line" (1971)
1968	It Takes a Thief	Dead Man	— "A Thief Is a Thief"
1968	The Name of the Game	Peter Max	— "Collector's Edition"
1968	Istanbul Express	Cheval	Television film
1969	The Bold Ones: The New Doctors	Dr. Theodore Stuart	recurring role (29 episodes)
1970	Company of Killers	Dave Poohler	Television film
1970	The Intruders	Billy Pye	Television film shot in 1967
1972	The Sixth Sense	Dr. Harry Auden	— "Lady, Lady, Take My Life"
1972	Night Gallery	Ianto (segment "I'll Never Leave You – Ever")	— "I'll Never Leave You – Ever / There Aren't Any More MacBanes"
1972	Kung Fu	Raven	— "King of the Mountain"
1972	Banyon	Johnny Clay	— "The Clay Clarinet"
1972	Norman Corwin Presents	Unknown	— "The Better It Looks, the Worse It Is"
1973	Snatched	Paul Maxvill	Television film
1973	The Streets of San Francisco	Vince Hagopian Jr.	— "A Collection of Eagles"
1973	The Rookies	Farley	— "Cauldron"
1973	Linda	Jeff Braden	Television film
1973	Police Story	Rick Calvelli	— "Death on Credit"
1974	Banacek	Harry Harland	— "The Vanishing Chalice"
1974	Can Ellen Be Saved?	James Hallbeck	Television film
1974	Planet Earth	Dylan Hunt	Television film
1974	The Mary Tyler Moore Show	Mike Tedesco	— "Menage-a-Phyllis"
1974–1976	The Six Million Dollar Man	Nedlick / Major Frederick Sloan	2 episodes — "Day of the Robot" (1974) — "The Return of Bigfoot: Part 1" (1976)
1975	Crossfire	Dave Ambrose	Television film
1975	Strange New World	Captain Anthony Vico	Television film
1975	Petrocelli	Richie Martin	— "Mark of Cain"
1976	The Rockford Files	Dave Delaroux	— "A Portrait of Elizabeth"
1976	The Bionic Woman	Nedlick	— "The Return of Bigfoot: Part 2"
1976	Starsky and Hutch	Rene Nadasy	— "The Vampire"
1976	Wonder Woman	Captain Horst Radl	2 episodes
1976	Once an Eagle	Captain Townshend	Miniseries (4 episodes)
1976	Raid on Entebbe	General Benny Peled	Television film
1977	Most Wanted	Randall Mason	— "The Insider"
1977	The Fantastic Journey	Consul Tarant	— "A Dream of Conquest"
1977	Westside Medical	Bob Farrow	— "Intensive Care"
1977	Quincy M.E.	Charles Desskasa, Publisher	— "Sullied By Thy Name"
1977	79 Park Avenue	Harry Vito	Miniseries (3 episodes)
1978	The Immigrants	Alan Brocker	Television film
1978	Greatest Heroes of the Bible	Adonijah	— "The Judgement of Solomon"
1978–1984	Fantasy Island	Michael Anderson / Cyrano de Bergerac / Monsieur Berandt Sabatier / Evan Watkins / Professor Harold DeHaven / Colin McArthur / Dr. Roger Sullivan	6 episodes
1979	Hawaii Five-O	Harry Clive	— "The Bark and the Bite"
1980	Vega$	Michael Jennings	— "Aloha, You're Dead"
1980	Masters Of The Martial Arts	Host / Narrator	a syndicated series of 26 shows
1981	Golden Gate	Monty Sager	Television film
1982	Rooster	Jerome Brademan	Television film
1982–1984	Dynasty	Rashid Ahmed	Recurring role (6 episodes)
1982–1988	Falcon Crest	Tony Cumson	Recurring role (32 episodes)
1983	Savage in the Orient	Nick Costa	Television film
1983	Hardcastle and McCormick	Martin Cody	— "Rolling Thunder"
1983	Scarecrow and Mrs. King	Dirk Fredericks	2 episodes — "The First Time" — "Saved by the Bells"
1983–1985	The A-Team	Kalem / Martin James	2 episodes — "Children of Jamestown" (1983) — "Moving Targets" (1985)
1984	Magnum P.I.	Ed Russler	— "Jororo Farewell"
1984	Masquerade	Joey Savane	— "The French Correction"
1984	Finder of Lost Loves	Commander Zach Donahue	— "White Lies"
1984	American Playhouse Presents	Epps	— "Solomon Northup's Odyssey"
1984–1994	Murder, She Wrote	Bernardo Bonelli / Marco Gambini / Jerry Lydecker	3 episodes — "Hooray for Homicide" (1984) — "A Very Good Year for Murder" (1988) — "Proof in the Pudding" (1994)
1985	Half Nelson	Unknown	— "Diplomatic Immunity"
1985	Brothers in Law	Royal Cane	Television film
1985	Glitter	The Author	— "The Matriarch"
1987	Alfred Hitchcock Presents	Garth December	— "The Specialty of the House"
1987	Hotel	Jack Curtis	— "Fallen Angel"
1989	The Ray Bradbury Theatre	Dudley Stone	— "The Wonderful Death of Dudley Stone"
1991	Monsters	Benjamin O'Connell	— "The Waiting Room"
1991	Matlock	John Franklin	— "The Parents"
1991	Payoff	Rafael Concion	Television film
1991	Blackmail	Gene	Television film
1991	In the Heat of the Night	Dalton Sykes	— "Liar's Poker"
1992	Lucky Luke	The Man In Black	— "Magia Indiana"
1994–1995	Melrose Place	Henry Waxman	recurring role (4 episodes)
1995	Liz: The Elizabeth Taylor Story	Richard Brooks	Television film
1996	Kung Fu: The Legend Continues	Straker	— "Escape"
1997	California	Don Rafael Guevara	— "Episode #1.1"
2001	Living in Fear	Reverend Leo Hausman	Television film
2005	CSI: Crime Scene Investigation	Walter Gordon	— "Grave Danger: Part 1"
2006	Masters of Horror	Jeb "Pa" Jameson	— "Pelts"
2009	War Wolves	Tony Ford	Television film

== Awards and nominations ==
Golden Globe Awards

- 1958 New Star of the Year – Actor: This Happy Feeling (won)
- 1967 Best Supporting Actor – Motion Picture: The Appaloosa (nominated)

Action On Film International Film Festival

- 2006 Best Supporting Actor: The Craving Heart (won)

Beverly Hills Shorts Festival

- 2009 Best Actor: Old Dogs (won)

FAIF International Film Festival

- 2006 Judge Choice Award for Best Supporting Actor: The Craving Heart (nominated)

Method Fest Independent Film Festival

- 2008 Best Supporting Actor: God's Ears (nominated)

New Media Film Festival

- 2010 Best Feature: God's Ears (won)
- 2010 Grand Prize Festival Award: God's Ears (won)

Western Heritage Awards

- 1967 Bronze Wrangler: The Appaloosa (won)
