= Jonathan of the Bears =

1993 film

- Directed by: Enzo G. Castellari
- Screenplay by: Enzo G. Castellari; Lorenzo De Luca
- Story by: Franco Nero; Lorenzo De Luca
- Starring: Franco Nero; John Saxon; Floyd Red Crow Westerman
- Cinematography: Michail Agranovich
- Edited by: Alberto Moriani
- Music by: Alexander Biliaev; Clive Riche; Fabio Costantini; Knifewing Segura
- Production companies: Viva Cinematografica; Silvio Berlusconi Communications; Project Campo J.V., Moskva
- Distributed by: Penta Film Distribuzione
- Release date: 1995
- Running time: 100 minutes
- Countries: Italy; Russia
- Language: English

Jonathan of the Bears (Italian: Jonathan degli orsi) is a 1995 spaghetti Western film directed by Enzo G. Castellari. It was coproduced and filmed in Russia, where it was released as Месть - белого индейца (Revenge of the White Indian).

== Plot ==
Young Jonathan Kowalski hides in a cave when a bunch of criminals kills his family. Hereby he meets a little bear. The two orphans live together until Jonathan gets picked up by a friendly tribe of Indians. Being raised as the chief's stepson he's respected and takes a wife named Shaya. When he thinks he's got it all, the tycoon Fred Goodwin finds oil in the soil of his tribe. Still haunted by not having been able to rescue his original family Jonathan decides to protect his clan against Fred Goodwin and his mercenaries. His enemies finally capture and crucify him. Jonathan is soon rescued by the son of African slaves.

== Cast ==
- Franco Nero: Jonathan
- Igor Alimov: Jonathan, as a boy
- John Saxon: Fred Goodwin
- Floyd Red Crow Westerman: Tawanka
- David Hess: Maddock
- Rodrigo Obregón: Kaspar
- Ennio Girolami: Goodwin's mercenary
- Bobby Rhodes: Williamson
- Marie Louise Sinclair: Madam of a brothel
- Boris Khmelnitsky: the religious mercenary
- Knifewing Segura: Chatow

== Production ==
Jonathan of the Bears began production in 1993. In his 2011 book Any Gun Can Play, Kevin Grant describes it as the last major European Western. The film went into development when Franco Nero was making a film in Russia and set up a deal to finance a Western between his Muscovite producer and Silvio Berlusconi's Mediaset. Grant felt the film was influenced by Kevin Costner's film Dances With Wolves but Nero insists that the film was in preparation before Costner's film was made. Nero went to the United States to seek involvement of Floyd Red Crow Westerman who was in Dances With Wolves for the film. Nero also got Knifewing Segura to sing on the film's soundtrack. The film was shot entirely in Russia.

According to a 2002 interview with actor John Saxon, the movie was filmed on a Russian army base that was still operational. The western village that was built there as a set, was made with real timber. The houses even had plumbing and electricity. Saxon explained: "Sometimes we would be shooting and we would hear these noises and it would be drunks sleeping in one of the rooms. See, anybody could come into that base. We walked in and out all the time without anyone checking us."

== Release ==
Jonathan of the Bears was shown at the Cannes Film Market in 1994. The film was not released until 1995. Nero blamed two factors for the film's commercial failure. The first being the distributors pulling the movie at Christmas time as Westerns came out that were financial flops: Wyatt Earp and Geronimo: An American Legend leading the film to not be released until May. In Italy, this was the worst period for opening films as few visited theaters between May and September. Nero also blamed the failure as the first half of the film looked like "a movie for children, with the boy and the bear, and then the second part is a proper Italian Western. I have always said to Castellari, 'Enzo, you should have cut at least 10 or 15 minutes out of the first part."

== See also ==
- List of Italian films of 1995
