= Goffredo Parise =

Italian writer, journalist, and screenwriter

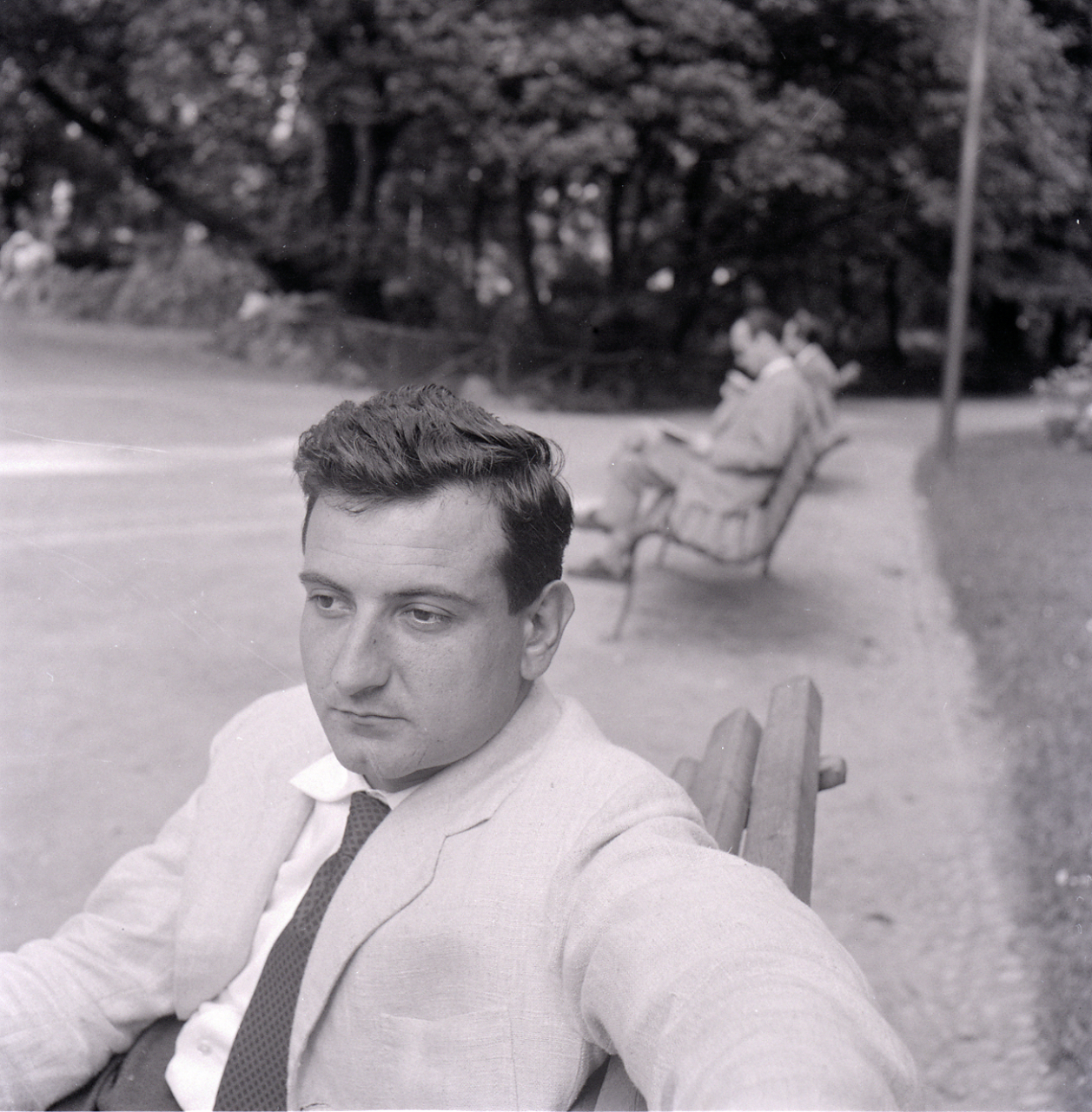
Goffredo Parise photographed by Paolo Monti in 1982

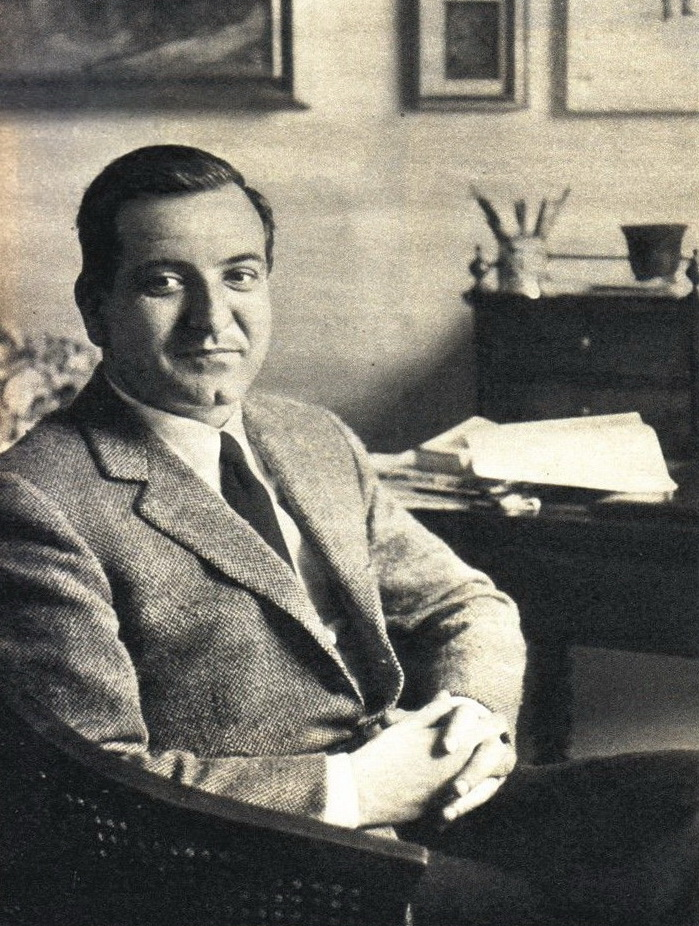
Goffredo Parise, 1965

Goffredo Parise (8 December 1929 in Vicenza – 31 August 1986 in Treviso) was an Italian writer, journalist, and screenwriter. He won the Viareggio Prize in 1965 for his novel Il padrone (The Boss) and the Strega Prize in 1982 for Sillabario n.2.

== Works ==
- The Dead Boy and the Comets, translated by Marianne Ceconi, New York: Farrar, Straus and Young, 1953
- Don Gastone and the Ladies, trans. by Stuart Hood, New York: Knopf, 1955
- The Boss, trans. by William Weaver, New York: Knopf, 1966
- Solitudes, trans. by Isabel Quigly, introduction by Natalia Ginzburg, New York: Vintage, 1982
- Abecedary, trans. by James Marcus, Marlboro, Vt.: Marlboro Press, 1990
- The Smell of Blood, trans by John Shepley, Evanston, Ill.: Marlboro Press/Northwestern, 2003

== Selected filmography ==
- Boccaccio '70 (1962)
- La cuccagna (1962)
- Careless (1962)
- Agostino (1962)
- Oggi, domani, dopodomani (1965)
- L'assoluto naturale (1969)
