= Sal Mineo =

American actor (1939–1976)

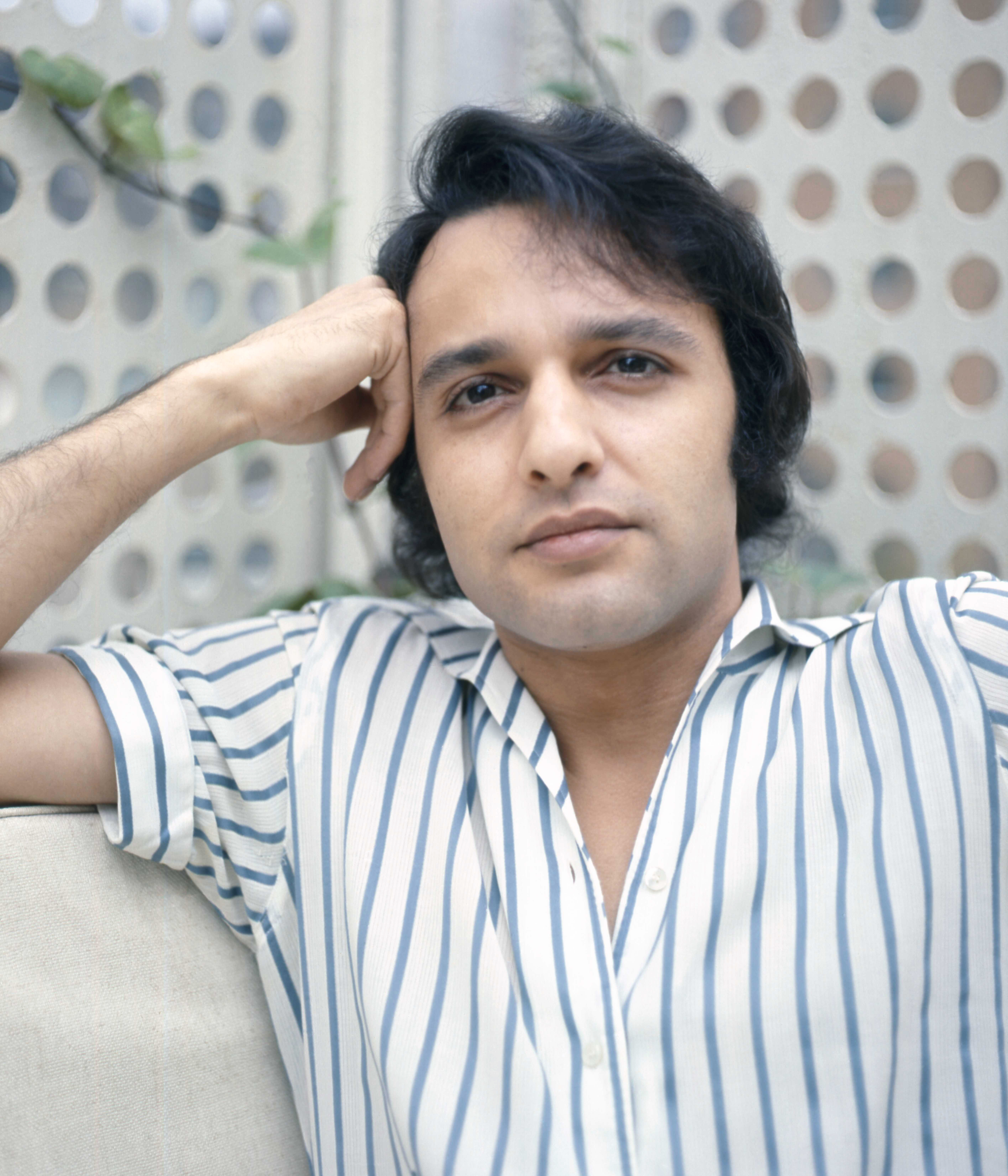
- Mineo in 1973
- Born: Salvatore Mineo Jr. January 10, 1939; New York City, U.S.
- Died: February 12, 1976 (aged 37); West Hollywood, California, U.S.
- Cause of death: Murder (stab wound to the heart)
- Resting place: Gate of Heaven Cemetery, Hawthorne, New York, U.S.
- Other name: The Switchblade Kid
- Occupation: Actor
- Years active: 1951–1976
- Known for: Rebel Without a Cause; Exodus
- Partners: Jill Haworth (1960–1964); Courtney Burr III (1970–1976)
- Website: salmineo.com

Salvatore Mineo Jr. (January 10, 1939 – February 12, 1976) was an American actor. He was best known for his role as John "Plato" Crawford in the coming-of-age drama film Rebel Without a Cause (1955), which earned him a nomination for the Academy Award for Best Supporting Actor at age 17, making him the fifth-youngest nominee in the category.

Mineo also starred in films such as Crime in the Streets, Giant (both 1956), Exodus (1960), for which he won a Golden Globe and received a second Academy Award nomination; The Longest Day (1962), John Ford's final western Cheyenne Autumn (1964), and Escape from the Planet of the Apes (1971).

== Early life and education ==
Mineo was born in the Bronx, New York City, the son of coffin makers Josephine (née Alvisi) and Salvatore Mineo Sr. He was of Sicilian descent. His father was born in Italy and immigrated to the United States. His mother, also ethnic Italian, was born in New York. Mineo's sister Sarina and brothers Michael and Victor also became actors. He attended the Quintano School for Young Professionals, a performing arts school in New York City. Mineo was one of the few Italian-American actors of his era to keep his surname, saying he was proud of his heritage and identity.

== Acting career ==
=== Child actor ===
Mineo's mother enrolled him in dancing and acting school at an early age. He had his first stage appearance in Tennessee Williams's play The Rose Tattoo (1951). He also played the young prince opposite Yul Brynner in the stage musical The King and I. Brynner took the opportunity to help Mineo better himself as an actor.

On May 8, 1954, Mineo portrayed the Page (lip-synching to the voice of mezzo-soprano Carol Jones) in the NBC Opera Theatre's production of Richard Strauss's Salome (in English translation), set to Oscar Wilde's play. Elaine Malbin performed the title role, and Peter Herman Adler conducted Kirk Browning's production.

As a teenager, Mineo appeared on ABC's musical quiz program Jukebox Jury. Mineo made several television appearances before making his screen debut in the Joseph Pevney film Six Bridges to Cross (1955). He beat out Clint Eastwood for the role. Mineo successfully auditioned for a part in The Private War of Major Benson (1955), as a cadet colonel opposite Charlton Heston.

=== Rebel Without a Cause and stardom ===
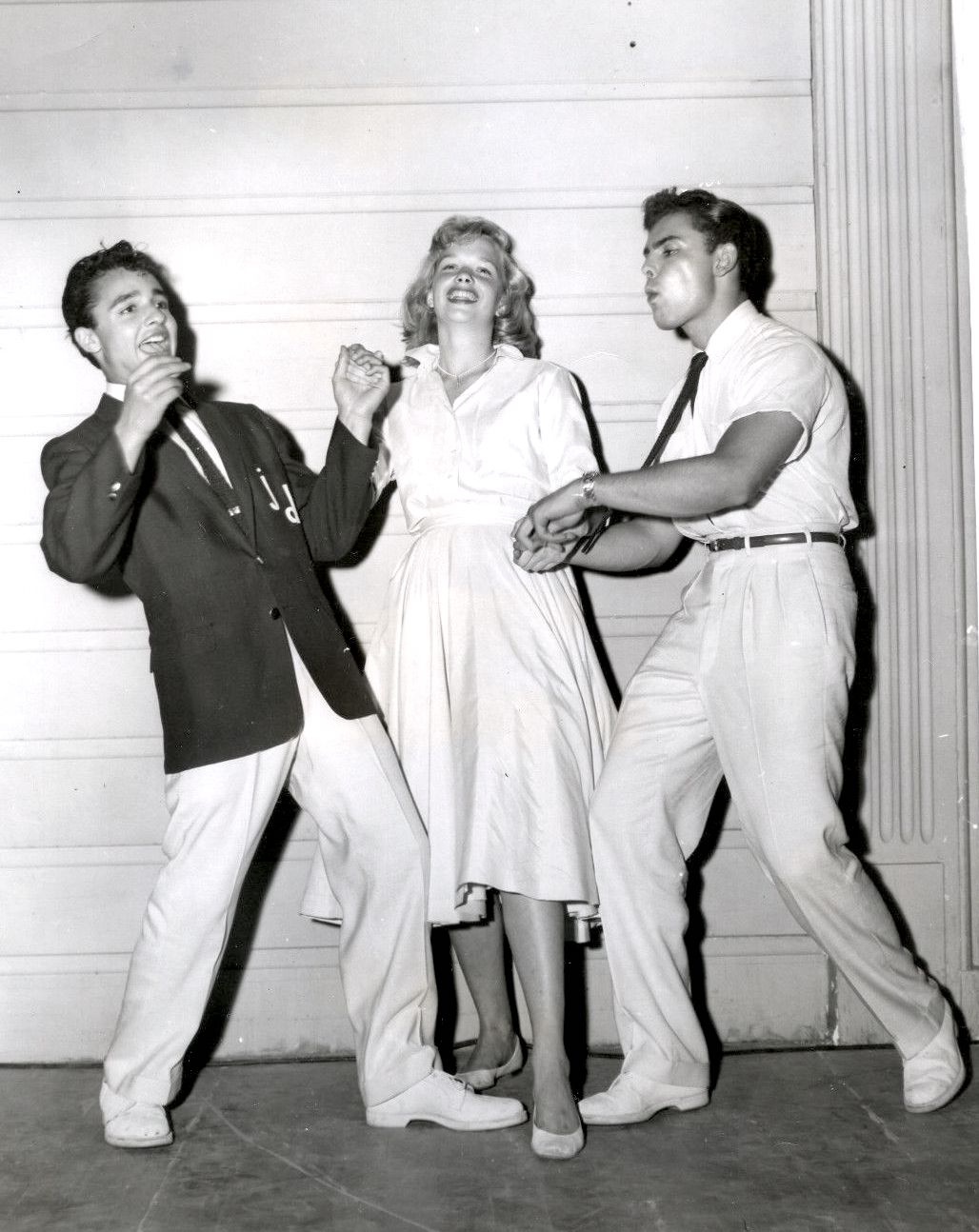
Mineo (left) with Sue George and John Saxon in a publicity still photo for Rock, Pretty Baby (1956)

Mineo's breakthrough as an actor came in Rebel Without a Cause (1955), in which he played John "Plato" Crawford, a sensitive teenager smitten with main character Jim Stark (played by James Dean). Mineo's performance resulted in an Academy Award nomination for Best Supporting Actor and he became the fifth-youngest nominee in the category, at the age of 17. Mineo's biographer Paul Jeffers recounted that Mineo received thousands of letters from young female fans, was mobbed by them at public appearances, and further wrote: "He dated the most beautiful women in Hollywood and New York City."

In Giant (1956), Mineo played Angel Obregon II, a Mexican boy killed in World War II. Many of his subsequent roles were variations of his role in Rebel Without a Cause, and he was typecast as a troubled teen. In the Disney adventure Tonka (1958), for instance, Mineo starred as a young Sioux named White Bull who traps and trains a clear-eyed, spirited wild horse named Tonka. Later the horse is bought by the US Army and renamed Comanche. He was injured but survived Custer's Last Stand; afterward he was treated and honored by Army officials.

By the late 1950s, Mineo was a major celebrity. He was sometimes referred to as the "Switchblade Kid", a nickname he earned from his role as a criminal in the movie Crime in the Streets (1956).

In 1957, Mineo made a brief foray into pop music by recording a handful of songs and an album. Two of his singles reached the Top 40 in the United States' Billboard Hot 100. The more popular of the two, "Start Movin' (In My Direction)", reached No. 9 on Billboard's pop chart. It sold over one million copies and was awarded a gold disc.

He starred as drummer Gene Krupa in the movie The Gene Krupa Story (1959), directed by Don Weis with Susan Kohner, James Darren, and Susan Oliver. He appeared as the celebrity guest challenger on the June 30, 1957, episode of What's My Line?

Mineo made an effort to break out of the typecasting. In addition to his roles as an Indian brave in Tonka (1958), and a Mexican youth in Giant (1956), he played a Jewish Holocaust survivor in Exodus (1960) who immigrated to Palestine and joined armed resistance to British authority. For his work in Exodus, he won a Golden Globe Award and received his second Academy Award nomination for Best Supporting Actor.

=== Career shift ===
By the early 1960s, Mineo was becoming too old to play the type of role that had made him famous. Rumors of his homosexuality resulted in his being considered inappropriate for leading roles. He auditioned for David Lean's film Lawrence of Arabia (1962) but was not hired. Mineo appeared in The Longest Day (1962), in which he played a private killed by a German after the landing in Sainte-Mère-Église. Mineo was baffled by his sudden loss of popularity, later saying: "One minute it seemed I had more movie offers than I could handle; the next, no one wanted me."

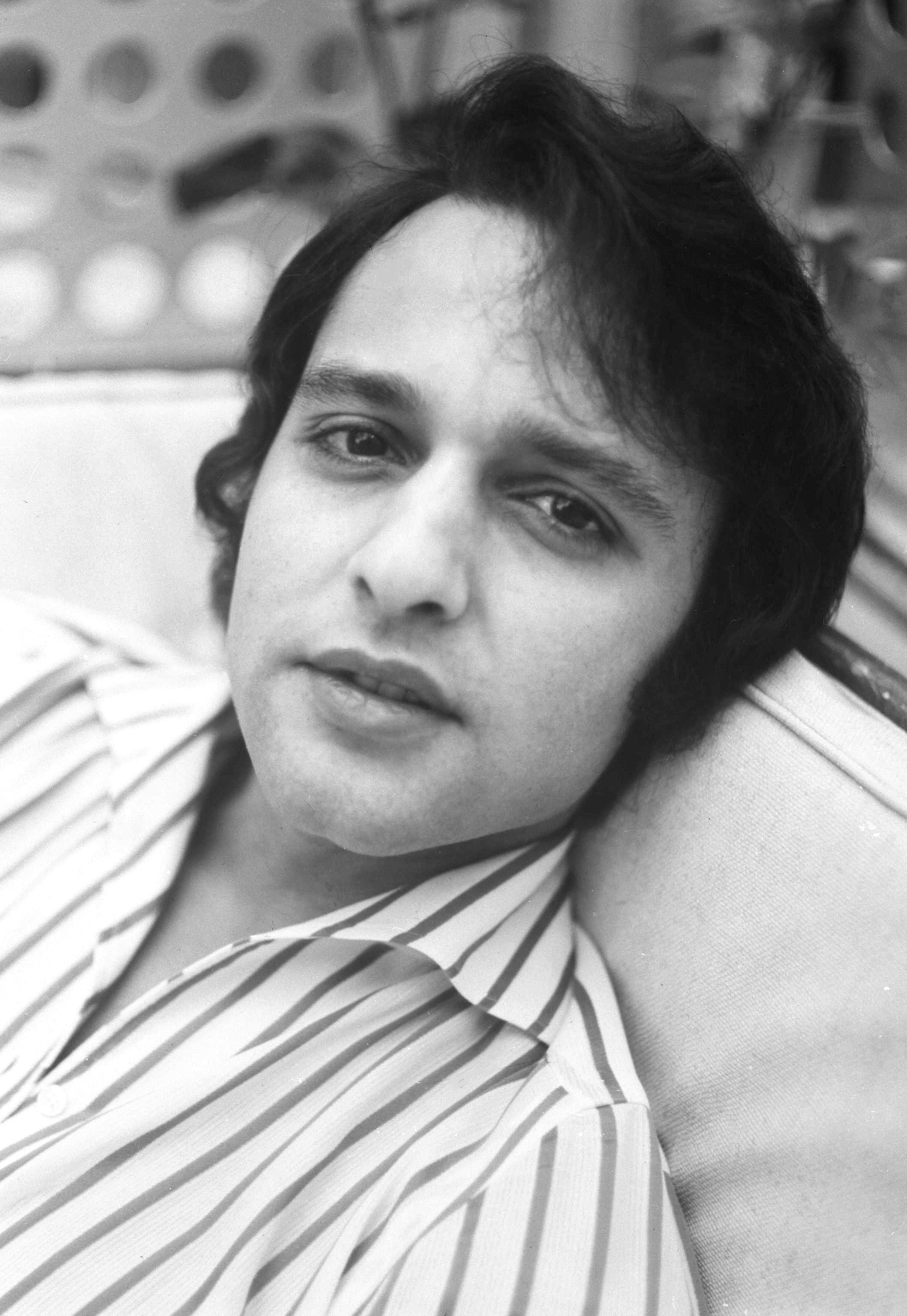
Mineo in 1973, photographed by Allan Warren

Mineo was the model for Harold Stevenson's painting The New Adam (1963). Now in the Guggenheim Museum's permanent collection, the painting is considered "one of the great American nudes".

Mineo appeared on the Season 2 episode of The Patty Duke Show: "Patty Meets a Celebrity" (1964).

Mineo's role as a stalker in Who Killed Teddy Bear (1965), which co-starred Juliet Prowse, did not seem to help his career. Although his performance was praised by critics, he found himself typecast again—this time as a deranged criminal. The high point of this period was his portrayal of Uriah in The Greatest Story Ever Told (1965). Mineo guest-starred in an episode of the TV series Combat! in 1966, playing the role of a GI wanted for murder. He appeared in two more episodes of this series, including one featuring Fernando Lamas.

In 1969, Mineo directed a Los Angeles production of the gay-themed play Fortune and Men's Eyes (1967), featuring then-unknown Don Johnson as Smitty and Mineo as Rocky. The production received positive reviews, although its expanded prison rape scene was criticized as excessive and gratuitous. Mineo's last role in a motion picture was a small part in the film Escape from the Planet of the Apes (1971); he played the chimpanzee Dr. Milo.

In December 1972, Mineo stage-directed the Gian Carlo Menotti short opera The Medium in Detroit. Muriel Costa-Greenspon portrayed the title character, Madame Flora, and Mineo played the mute, Toby. In 1975, Mineo appeared as Rachman Habib, the assistant to a murderous consular head (portrayed by Hector Elizondo) of a Middle Eastern country, in the Columbo episode "A Case of Immunity," on NBC-TV. One of his last roles was a guest spot on the TV series S.W.A.T. (1975), in which he portrayed a cult leader similar to Charles Manson.

By 1976, Mineo's career had begun to turn around. While playing the role of a bisexual burglar in a series of stage performances of the comedy P.S. Your Cat Is Dead in San Francisco, Mineo received substantial publicity from many positive reviews; he moved to Los Angeles along with the play.

== Personal life ==
In a 1972 interview with Boze Hadleigh, Mineo confirmed his bisexuality.

Mineo met English-born actress Jill Haworth on the set of the film Exodus in 1960, in which they portrayed young lovers. She was then 15 years old. Mineo and Haworth were in an on-and-off relationship for many years. They were engaged to be married at one point. According to Mineo biographer Michael Gregg Michaud, Haworth cancelled the engagement after she caught Mineo having sexual relations with a man. The two remained very close friends until Mineo's death.

Mineo expressed disapproval of Haworth's brief relationship with television producer Aaron Spelling, because he was 22 years older than she. One night, when Mineo found Haworth and Spelling at a private Beverly Hills nightclub, he punched Spelling in the face, yelling, "Do you know how old she is? What are you doing with her at your age?"

At the time of his death, Mineo was in a six-year relationship with actor and retired acting coach Courtney Burr III.

In 2010, Michael Gregg Michaud published a biography of Sal Mineo. He received critical acclaim for his depth of research and the contributions he gained from Sal's friends, family, acquaintances and co-stars. Michaud dedicated the book to Jill Haworth and Courtney Burr III: both were significant partners to Mineo and they remained close friends until Haworth's death.

== Death ==
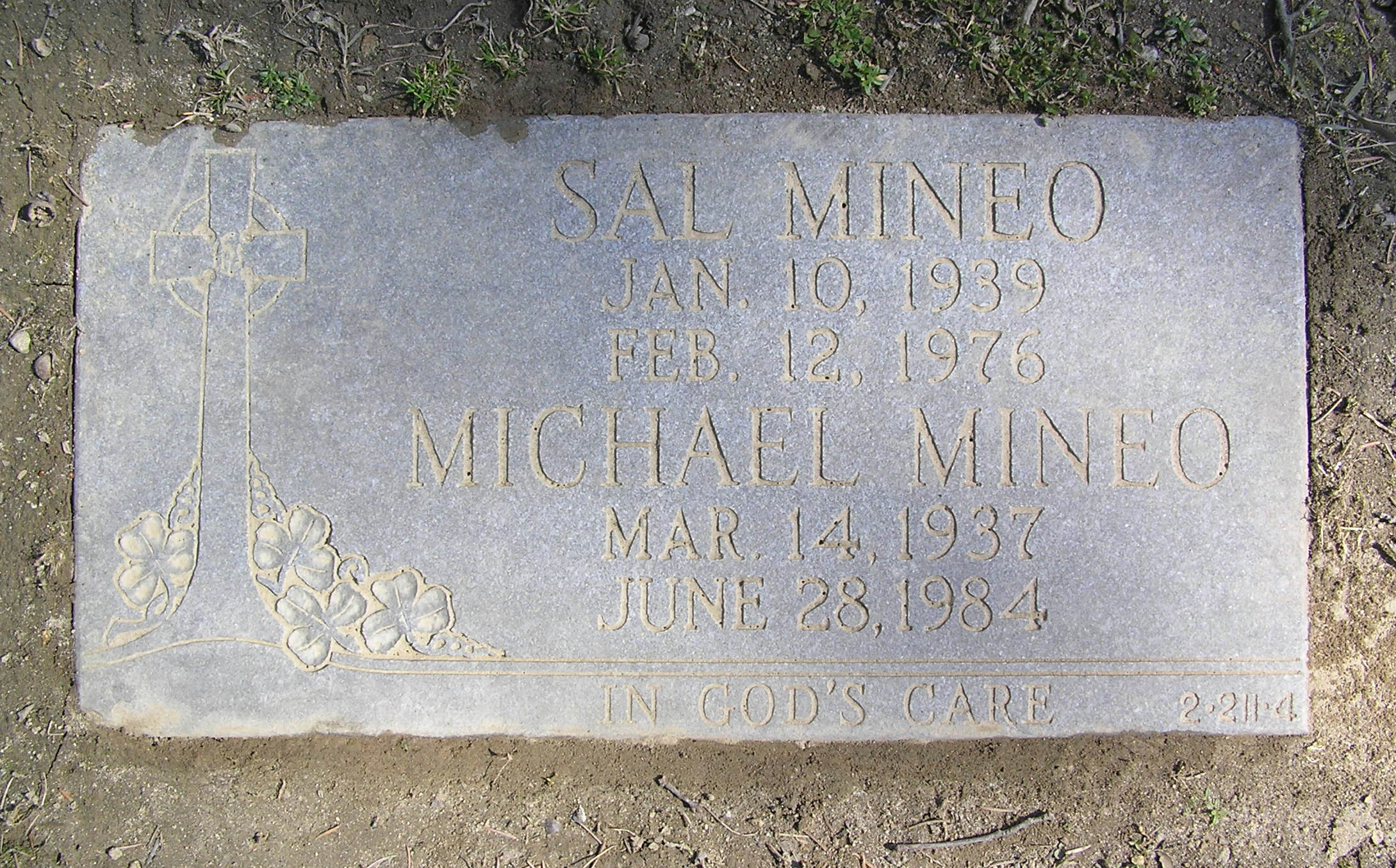
Footstone for Sal Mineo and his brother Michael in the Gate of Heaven Cemetery, New York State

On the night of February 12, 1976, Mineo returned home at 10:00 p.m. from a rehearsal for the play P.S. Your Cat Is Dead. After parking his car in the carport below the West Hollywood apartment that he shared with Courtney Burr III, he was attacked and fatally stabbed in the heart by a mugger. Mineo was found lying in the parking alley and bleeding profusely by his neighbor Raymond Evans, who had heard his cries and helped him to his feet. Mineo walked only a few steps before he collapsed. He was pronounced dead at the scene at the age of 37, due to massive hemorrhage.

A funeral for Mineo was held at Most Holy Trinity Church, Mamaroneck, on February 17, 1976, and was attended by 250 mourners. Mineo was buried at Gate of Heaven Cemetery in Hawthorne, New York.

In March 1979, Lionel Ray Williams, who had a long criminal record, was convicted and sentenced to 51 years in prison for killing Mineo, and for committing ten robberies. The police investigation concluded that Mineo was killed in a random robbery and that Williams did not know his victim that night. He has long asserted his innocence in Mineo's death, including after being released from prison in 1990. A documentary film titled Unseen Innocence (2024) sought to raise awareness of Williams' case and his unsuccessful efforts to gain exoneration.

== Filmography ==
=== Film ===
Year	Title	Role	Notes
1955	Six Bridges to Cross	Jerry (boy)	
1955	The Private War of Major Benson	Cadet Col. Sylvester Dusik	
1955	Rebel Without a Cause	John "Plato" Crawford	Nominated—Academy Award for Best Supporting Actor
1956	Crime in the Streets	Angelo "Baby" Gioia, a.k.a. Bambino	
1956	Somebody Up There Likes Me	Romolo	
1956	Giant	Angel Obregón II	
1956	Rock, Pretty Baby	Angelo Barrato	
1957	Dino	Dino Minetta	
1957	The Young Don't Cry	Leslie "Les" Henderson	
1958	Tonka	White Bull	
1959	A Private's Affair	Luigi Maresi	
1959	The Gene Krupa Story	Gene Krupa	
1960	Exodus	Dov Landau	Won—Golden Globe Award for Best Supporting Actor – Motion Picture; Nominated—Academy Award for Best Supporting Actor
1962	Escape from Zahrain	Ahmed	
1962	The Longest Day	Pvt. Martini	
1964	Cheyenne Autumn	Red Shirt	
1965	The Greatest Story Ever Told	Uriah	
1965	Who Killed Teddy Bear?	Lawrence Sherman	
1967	Stranger on the Run	George Blaylock	
1969	Krakatoa, East of Java	Leoncavallo Borghese	
1969	80 Steps to Jonah	Jerry Taggart	
1971	Escape from the Planet of the Apes	Dr. Milo	

=== Television ===
Year	Title	Role	Notes
1952	The Vision of Father Flanagan	Les	TV movie
1952	A Woman for the Ages	Charles	TV movie
1953	Omnibus	Paco	"The Capitol of the World"
1954	Janet Dean, Registered Nurse	Tommy Angelo	"The Magic Horn"
1955	Big Town		"Juvenile Gangs"
1955	Omnibus		"The Bad Men"
1955	The Philco Television Playhouse		"The Trees"
1955	Frontiers of Faith		"The Man on the 6:02"
1956	Look Up and Live		"Nothing to Do"
1956	The Alcoa Hour	Paco	"The Capitol of the World", "The Magic Horn"
1956	Westinghouse Studio One		"Dino"
1956	Look Up and Live		"Nothing to Do"
1956	Lux Video Theatre		"Tabloid"
1956	Screen Directors Playhouse		"The Dream"
1956	Climax!	Miguel	"Island in the City"
1957	The Ed Sullivan Show	Himself	Episodes 10.42, 10.48
1957	Kraft Suspense Theatre	Tony Russo	"Barefoot Soldier", "Drummer Man"
1957	Kraft Music Hall	Himself	Episode 10.8
1958	The DuPont Show of the Month	Aladdin	"Cole Porter's Aladdin"
1958	Pursuit	Jose Garcia	"The Garcia Story"
1959	The Ann Sothern Show	Nicky Silvero	"The Sal Mineo Story"
1962	The DuPont Show of the Week	Coke	"A Sound of Hunting"
1963	The Greatest Show on Earth	Billy Archer	"The Loser"
1964	Kraft Suspense Theatre	Ernie	"The World I Want"
1964	Dr. Kildare	Carlos Mendoza	"Tomorrow is a Fickle Girl"
1964	Combat!	Private Kogan	"The Hard Way Back"
1965	The Patty Duke Show	Himself	"Patty Meets a Celebrity"
1965	Burke's Law	Lew Dixon	"Who Killed the Rabbit's Husband?"
1966	Combat!	Vinnick	"Nothing to Lose"
1966	Combat!	Marcel Paulon	"The Brothers"
1966	Mona McCluskey		"The General Swings at Dawn"
1966	Run for Your Life	Tonio	"Sequestro!: Parts 1 and 2"
1966	Court Martial	Lt. Tony Bianchi	"The House Where He Lived"
1966	The Dangerous Days of Kiowa Jones	Bobby Jack Wilkes	TV movie
1967	Bob Hope Presents the Chrysler Theatre	Doctoroff	"A Song Called Revenge"
1967	Stranger on the Run	George Blaylock	TV movie
1968	Hawaii Five-O	Bobby George	"Tiger By The Tail"
1969	The Name of the Game	Sheldon	"A Hard Case Of The Blues"
1970	Mission Impossible	Mel Bracken	Flip Side
1970	The Challengers	Angel de Angelo	TV movie
1970	The Name of the Game	Wade Hillary	"So Long, Baby, and Amen"
1971	My Three Sons	Jim Bell	"The Liberty Bell"
1971	The Immortal	Tsinnajinni	"Sanctuary"
1971	Dan August	Mort Downes	"The Worst Crime"
1971	In Search of America	Nick	ABC Movie of the Week
1971	How to Steal an Airplane	Luis Ortega	TV movie
1972	The Family Rico	Nick Rico	TV movie
1973	Griff	President Gamal Zaki	"Marked for Murder"
1973	Harry O	Walter Scheerer	"Such Dust as Dreams Are Made On"
1974	Tenafly	Jerry Farmer	"Man Running"
1974	Police Story	Stippy	"The Hunters"
1975	Columbo	Rachman Habib	"A Case of Immunity"
1975	Hawaii Five-O	Eddie	"Hit Gun for Sale"
1975	Harry O	Broker	"Elegy for a Cop"
1975	S.W.A.T.	Roy	"Deadly Tide: Parts 1 and 2"
1975	S.W.A.T.	Joey Hopper	"A Coven of Killers"
1975	Police Story	Fobbes	"Test of Brotherhood"
1976	Ellery Queen	James Danello	"The Adventure of the Wary Witness"
1976	Joe Forrester	Parma	"The Answer", (final appearance)

== Awards and nominations ==
Institution	Category	Year	Work	Result
Academy Awards	Best Supporting Actor	1956	Rebel Without a Cause	Nominated
Academy Awards	Best Supporting Actor	1961	Exodus	Nominated
Golden Globe Awards	Best Supporting Actor	1961	Exodus	Won
Primetime Emmy Awards	Best Single Performance by an Actor	1957	Studio One	Nominated
Laurel Awards	Top Male Supporting Performance	1961	Exodus	Won

== See also ==
- List of Italian-American actors
- List of oldest and youngest Academy Award winners and nominees – Youngest nominees for Best Actor in a Supporting Role
- List of LGBTQ Academy Award winners and nominees – Confirmed individuals for Best Supporting Actor
- List of actors with Academy Award nominations
- List of actors with two or more Academy Award nominations in acting categories
