= Mardi Gras (1958 film) =

1958 film by Edmund Goulding

- Directed by: Edmund Goulding
- Written by: Hal Kanter; Winston Miller
- Based on: story by Curtis Harrington
- Produced by: Jerry Wald
- Starring: Pat Boone
- Music by: Lionel Newman
- Production company: Jerry Wald Productions
- Distributed by: 20th Century Fox
- Release date: November 18, 1958
- Running time: 107 min.
- Country: United States
- Language: English
- Budget: $1.69 million
- Box office: $2.5 million

Mardi Gras is a 1958 American musical comedy film directed by Edmund Goulding and starring Pat Boone and Christine Carère.

== Plot ==
A military school cadet (Boone) wins a date with a French movie goddess (Carère) who happens to be the queen of the "Mardi Gras" parade. The two fall in love, but Carère's movie studio wants to capitalize on this newly found love for publicity.

== Cast ==
- Pat Boone as Paul Newell
- Christine Carère as Michelle Marton (singing voice was dubbed by Lilyan Chauvin)
- Tommy Sands as Barry Denton
- Sheree North as Eadie West (singing voice was dubbed by Eileen Wilson)
- Gary Crosby as Tony Collins
- Fred Clark as Al Curtis
- Dick Sargent as Dick Saglon
- Barrie Chase as Torchy Larue
- Jennifer West as Sylvia Simmons
- Geraldine Wall as Ann Harris
- King Calder as Lt. Col. Vaupell
- Robert Burton as Comdr. Tydings
- The Corps of Cadets of the Virginia Military Institute

== Production ==
Jerry Wald announced the film in October 1957. It was called Romantic Comedy and was based on an original story by Curtis Harrington, who worked for Wald. The film was about the adventures of four students from the Virginia Military Institute at Mardi Gras, but Wald was unable to use that title because Universal had it registered and he needed permission from the city of New Orleans. Wald said the stars would be Robert Wagner, Jeffrey Hunter and Tony Randall, and he hoped for Mitzi Gaynor to play the movie star.

By the following month, these permissions had been secured and Wald had also arranged for cooperation from the city of New Orleans and the Virginia Military Institute. Winston Miller had been signed to write a script and had already completed half the job. He was sent to VMI for further research.

Wald arranged for second unit filming done of Virginia Military Institute even before a director had been arranged. He originally wanted Gene Kelly but Kelly was too expensive. He eventually decided on Edmund Goulding, whose career was in decline and was therefore cheap, because Wald had admired his films when he was younger.

The script was finished by November 1957.

=== Casting ===
In December 1957, Wald announced that Barry Coe from Peyton Place would play a lead.

Pat Boone's casting was announced in February 1958. Shirley Jones, who had co-starred with Boone in April Love, was meant to play the female lead but had to drop out due to pregnancy. Instead the studio cast French actress Christine Carère, who had just made A Certain Smile for Fox.

The film was Sheree North's final film with 20th Century Fox, who had signed North in 1954 in order to mold her as a replacement for Marilyn Monroe. While under contract with Fox, North made six other movies that Fox also released: How to Be Very, Very Popular (1955), The Lieutenant Wore Skirts (1956), The Best Things in Life Are Free (1956), The Way to the Gold (1957), No Down Payment (1957) and In Love and War (1958).

Filming started on July 15, 1958.

Shot on location in New Orleans, in CinemaScope and Deluxe color, this was director Goulding's final film.

== Reception ==
The film received generally good notices ("makes for sprightly, gay entertainment" – Los Angeles Times).

In October 1958 Wald predicted the film would make $15 million worldwide.

It opened at number four at the US box office and the following week went to number one where it stayed for two weeks and Variety ranked it the December box office winner but it failed to continue to do well at the box-office.

According to Kinematograph Weekly, the film performed "better than average" at the British box office in 1959.

Diabolique later wrote: "The film is bright enough, but is hampered by its casting. Boone is fine, but Carrere looks like a stunned mullet for most of the running time. Boone kisses her on the cheek, incidentally, but still no mouth!"

=== Awards ===
Composer Lionel Newman was nominated for the Academy Award for Best Original Score (Scoring of a Musical Picture) for this film.
