= Buddy Adler =

American film producer

Maurice "Buddy" Adler
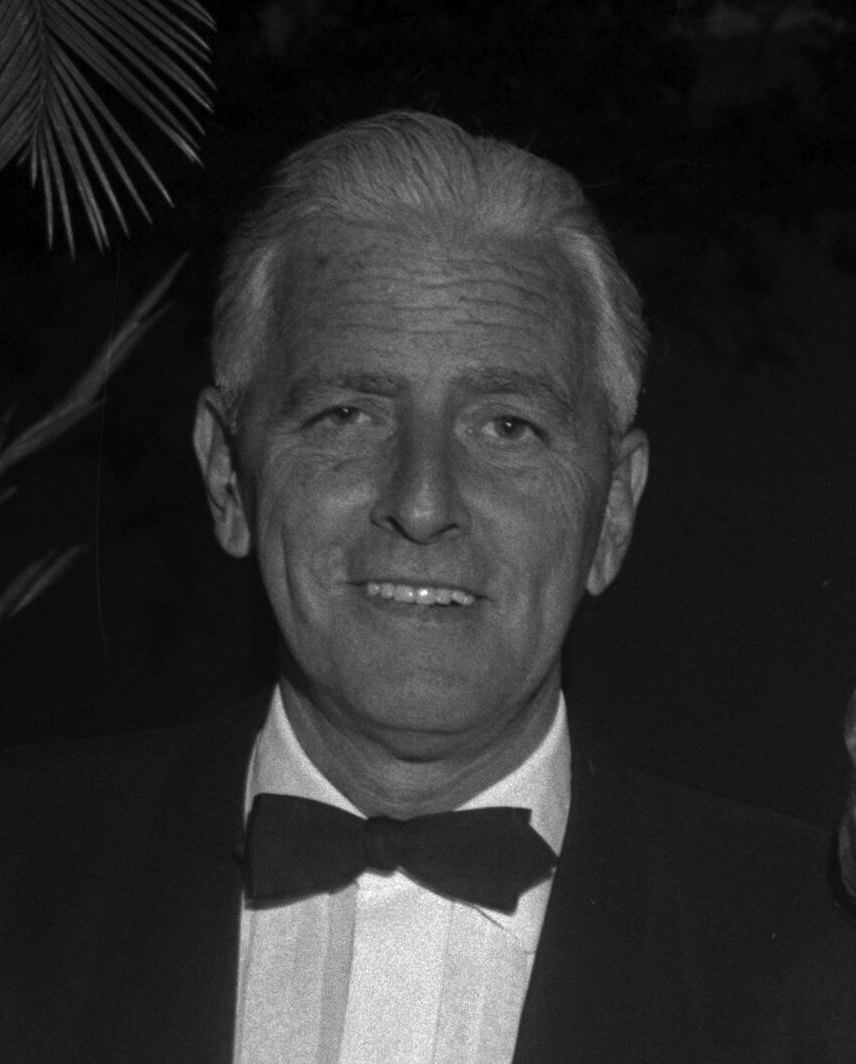
- Adler in 1958
- Born: E. Maurice Adler; June 22, 1906; New York City, U.S.
- Died: July 12, 1960 (aged 54); Los Angeles, California, U.S.
- Resting place: Forest Lawn Memorial Park Cemetery, Glendale, California
- Years active: 1939–1960
- Spouse: Anita Louise (1940–1960)

E. Maurice "Buddy" Adler (June 22, 1906 – July 12, 1960) was an American film producer and production head for 20th Century Fox Studios.

In 1954, his production of From Here to Eternity won the Academy Award for Best Picture, and in 1956, his Love Is a Many-Splendored Thing was nominated for Best Picture. Adler also produced the 1956 film Bus Stop, starring Marilyn Monroe. He was head of Fox when he died in 1960.

== Biography ==
Adler was born in New York City in 1906 (some references list his birth year as 1908 or 1909) with "Buddy" as his childhood nickname. His family ran a small chain of department stores, and Adler did advertising copy for the chain after he graduated from Pennsylvania University.

Adler began writing short stories in his spare time and published them under the name "Bradley Allen". In 1936, he moved to Hollywood, where he wrote the Pete Smith short features for MGM. He wrote the screenplay for the short documentary film Quicker'n a Wink, which won an Oscar in 1940. He also owned a small string of movie showhouses, called the Hitching Post.

During World War II, Adler served in the Signal Corps (1941–1945), ending with the rank of colonel. He was awarded the Legion of Merit. After the war, he returned to MGM as a full producer. However, he left that studio in 1946.

In May 1954 Adler moved from Columbia to Fox, where he produced several films. In April 1955 Adler was appointed to the staff of Zanuck; by this stage he had produced five pictures.

=== Head of Fox ===
In February 1956 Adler was named as Head of Production for 20th Century Fox, replacing Darryl F. Zanuck. Zanuck had quit Fox in part because the studio would not give him a percentage of the profits. Two years into Adler's tenure, he was given a nine-year contract, in which he was given a percentage of the profits. His life was insured for $2 million. While at Fox, Adler personally produced 14 films while running the studio, the last of which was The Inn of Sixth Happiness.

In 1956, Adler set up a production arm for Fox in London under Bob Goldstein.

In 1957, he established the Fox Talent School, with a $1 million budget. Actors who had their first starring roles under Adler include Elvis Presley, Pat Boone, Tommy Sands, Fabian, Stuart Whitman, Suzy Parker, Joanne Woodward, France Nuyen, May Britt, Bradford Dillman, Tony Randall, Barry Coe, and Diane Varsi.

Under Adler, Fox would release a combination of in-house production and those from independent producers, notably Daryl F Zanuck, Sam Engel, Robert Lippert, and Jerry Wald.

In August 1958, Adler said Fox would make 32 films at a cost of $60 million, plus low-budget movies made under Robert Lippert's Regal banner for release by Fox.

In August 1959 Adler announced Fox would make 54 films and had 67 people under contract.

In 1960 Adler announced a $65 million program of films, the highest for any studio in the industry.

== Personal life ==
Adler was born in New York City. He moved to Los Angeles, California, in 1936 and resided there for the rest of his life. In 1940, he married actress Anita Louise Fremault (1915–1970), with whom he had two children. The family was at his bedside when he died in 1960, from lung cancer.

Joan Collins told a story on The Graham Norton Show about a party where Adler asked Joan if she would like her pick of roles from upcoming Fox productions, and she said yes. He then told her that although he was older than her and married, if she was "nice" to him, he could do that for her. She rebuffed him and said that she was not interested in using the casting couch to get ahead in her career.

== Awards ==
Adler received the Irving G. Thalberg Memorial Award in 1957.

In 1958, he received the Golden Globe Cecil B. DeMille Award for lifetime achievement in motion pictures.

== Death ==
On June 15, 1960, Adler entered the hospital. On July 12, 1960, Adler died of lung cancer, aged 54, in Los Angeles. He was survived by his wife Anita Louise and his daughter, Melanie, 12, and son Anthony, 10.

He was interred in the Forest Lawn Memorial Park Cemetery in Glendale, California. His widow, who is buried there as well, survived him by ten years.

After his death, Variety wrote that Adler had "had a happy blend of many values capped by a handsome personality."

== Selected filmography ==
=== Shorts ===
- Quicker'n a Wink (1940) - writer

=== Columbia ===
- The Dark Past (1948) - producer
- Tell It to the Judge (1949) - producer
- No Sad Songs for Me (1950) - producer
- A Woman of Distinction (1950) - producer
- The Harlem Globetrotters (1951) - producer
- Saturday's Hero (1951) - producer
- Paula (1952) - producer
- Last of the Comanches (1952) - producer
- Salome (1953) - producer
- From Here to Eternity (1953) - producer

=== 20th Century Fox ===
- Love Is a Many-Splendored Thing (1955) - producer
- The Left Hand of God (1955) - producer
- House of Bamboo (1955) - producer
- Soldier of Fortune (1955) - producer
- Violent Saturday (1955) - producer
- Anastasia (1956) - producer
- Bus Stop (1956) - producer
- The Revolt of Mamie Stover (1956) - producer
- The Bottom of the Bottle (1956) - producer
- The Lieutenant Wore Skirts (1956) - producer
- A Hatful of Rain (1957) - producer
- Heaven Knows, Mr. Allison (1957) - producer
- The Inn of the Sixth Happiness (1958) - producer
- South Pacific (1958) - producer

=== Films made at Fox while head of production ===
- The King and I (1956) - producer Charles Brackett
- The Best Things in Life Are Free (1956) - producer Henry Ephron
- Between Heaven and Hell (1956) - producer David Weisbart
- Love Me Tender (1956) - producer David Weisbert
- Teenage Rebel (1956) - producer Charles Brackett
- Oh, Men! Oh, Women! (1957) - producer Nunnally Johnson
- Bernardine (1957) - producer Samuel G. Engel
- The Wayward Bus (1957) - producer Charles Brackett
- Kiss Them for Me (1957) - producer Jerry Wald
- The True Story of Jesse James (1957) - producer Herbt Swope
- An Affair to Remember (1957) - producer Jerry Wald, Leo McCarey
- Island in the Sun (1957) - producer Daryl F. Zanuck
- No Down Payment (1957) - producer Jerry Wald
- The Way to the Gold (1957) - producer David Weisbart
- April Love (1957) - producer David Weisbart
- Will Success Spoil Rock Hunter? (1957) - producer Frank Tashlin
- The Three Faces of Eve (1957) - producer Nunnally Johnson
- Boy on a Dolphin (1957) - producer Samuel G. Engel
- Peyton Place (1957) - producer Jerry Wald
- Stopover Tokyo (1957) - producer Walter Reisch
- The Young Lions (1958) - producer Al Lichtman
- The Gift of Love (1958) - producer Charles Brackett
- The Barbarian and the Geisha (1958) - producer Eugene Franke
- Fräulein (1958) - producer Walter Reisch
- Mardi Gras (1958) - producer Jerry Wald
- Ten North Frederick (1958) - producer Charles Brackett
- A Nice Little Bank That Should Be Robbed (1958) - produced Anthony Muto
- Rally Round the Flag, Boys! (1958) - producer by Leo McCarey
- The Long, Hot Summer (1958) - producer Jerry Wald
- In Love and War (1958) - producer Jerry Wald
- From Hell to Texas (1958) - producer Robert Buckner
- The Roots of Heaven (1958) - producer Daryl F. Zanuck
- A Certain Smile (1958) - producer Henry Ephron
- The Hunters (1958)
- The Remarkable Mr. Pennypacker (1959) - producer Charles Brackett
- Holiday for Lovers (1959)- producer David Weisbart
- The Diary of Anne Frank (1959) - producer George Stevens
- Compulsion (1959) - producer Richard Zanuck
- These Thousand Hills (1959) - producer David Weisbart
- A Private's Affair (1959) - producer David Weisbart
- The Best of Everything (1959) - producer Jerry Wald
- The Sound and the Fury (1959) - producer Jerry Wald
- Journey to the Center of the Earth (1959) - producer Charles Brackett
- Say One for Me (1959) - producer Frank Tashlin
- Blue Denim (1959) - producer Charles Brackett
- The Man Who Understood Women (1959) - producer Nunnally Johnson
- Hound-Dog Man (1959) - producer Jerry Wald
- Beloved Infidel (1959) - producer Jerry Wald
- The Story on Page One (1959) - producer Jerry Wald
- Sink the Bismarck! (1960) - producer John Brabourne
- Can Can (1960) - producer Jack Cummings
- The Story of Ruth (1960) - producer Sam Engel
- High Time (1960) - producer Charles Brackett
- Sons and Lovers (1960) - producer Jerry Wald
- Crack in the Mirror (1960) - producer Daryl F Zanuck
- Flaming Star (1960, but died a week before filming started)
- North to Alaska (1960, died midway through principal photography)
- Esther and the King (1960, greenlit before died)
