= Seven-year itch (idiom) =

Popular belief about romantic relationships

The seven-year itch is a popular belief, sometimes asserted to have statistical validity, that happiness in a marriage or long-term romantic relationship declines after around seven years.

The phrase was used in the title of the 1952 play The Seven Year Itch by George Axelrod, and gained popularity following the 1955 film adaptation starring Marilyn Monroe and Tom Ewell. In his 1913 novel, The Eighth Year, Philip Gibbs attributes the concept to the British judge Sir Francis Jeune.

The phrase has since expanded to indicate cycles of dissatisfaction not only in interpersonal relationships, but in any situation such as working a full-time job or buying a house, where a decrease in happiness and satisfaction is often seen over long periods of time.

The original meaning, prior to Axelrod's play, referred to scabies or skin disease. The phrase "seven-year itch" was used in this sense by Henry David Thoreau in Walden in 1854 and Carl Sandburg in 1936 in The People, Yes.

== Divorce rates ==
The idea of a seven-year itch puts a specific time on the generally observed phenomenon that data sets of married people show a rising, then a falling, risk of divorce over time. However, statistical results from these data sets are very sensitive to the statistical methods used, and such patterns may just reflect the method, rather than any underlying reality.

In samples taken from the U.S. National Center for Health Statistics, there proves to be an average median duration of marriage across time. In 1922, the median duration of marriage that ended in divorce was 6.6 years. In 1974, the median duration was 7.5 years. In 1990, the median duration was 7.2 years. While these can fluctuate from year to year, the averages stay relatively close to the seven year mark. Research from 2012 found that American divorce rates peaked after about ten to 12 years.

Studies from China of marriages between 1980 and 2010 found that divorce rates peaked anywhere from 5 years to 10 years after marriage, with more recent marriages (post-2000) being more likely to divorce after shorter periods of time.

Divorce rates in Finland as of 2018 show similar patterns, "consistent with psychological notions of 'honeymoon' and 'seven-year itch'."

== Media influences ==
The modern usage of the phrase gained popularity following the 1955 movie of the same name starring Marilyn Monroe. In the film, a man sends his family off on vacation for the summer while he stays back to work. He begins to fantasize about women that he previously had feelings for, when his new neighbor moves in and he decides to try and seduce her. Things go awry and he ends up not going through with it, but he believes that his wife will somehow know that he is trying to be unfaithful.

Whilst the term was originally used for unfavourable conditions of a long duration, the film helped to popularize its usage to refer to the decrease of romantic feelings between married couples over time. The phrase has become so popular that some couples use it as an indicator of the lifespan of their marriage, an example being a Bavarian politician, Gabriele Pauli, who has been divorced twice. She suggests after seven years marriage should end, with the couple required to resay their vows if they wish to continue for another seven years.

== See also ==
- Effects of hormones on sexual motivation
- Pair bond
- Psychology of sexual monogamy
- Sexual desire and intimate relationships
- Coolidge effect
- Lesbian bed death
