= The Lieutenant Wore Skirts =

1956 film by Frank Tashlin

- Directed by: Frank Tashlin
- Written by: Albert Beich; Frank Tashlin
- Produced by: Buddy Adler
- Starring: Tom Ewell; Sheree North; Rita Moreno
- Cinematography: Leo Tover
- Edited by: James B. Clark
- Music by: Cyril J. Mockridge
- Production company: Twentieth Century-Fox
- Distributed by: Twentieth Century-Fox
- Release date: January 11, 1956
- Running time: 99 minutes
- Country: United States
- Language: English
- Budget: $970,000
- Box office: $2,250,000 (US)

The Lieutenant Wore Skirts is a 1956 American comedy film directed by Frank Tashlin and starring Tom Ewell, Sheree North, and Rita Moreno. It is a comedy about a man whose marriage begins to fail when his wife enlists.

== Plot ==
TV writer Greg Whitcomb did his military service heroically in the Pacific theater of the Second World War but now has settled into everyday life with a young wife, Katy. A letter from the Air Force Department arrives that Katy believes is calling Greg back to active duty from the Air Force reserve, but she hides it during a party celebrating their wedding anniversary.

A captain attending the party, Barney Sloan, casually calls Greg an "old-timer," offending him. Greg gets drunk and passes out. His pride stung, Greg is willing to return to duty once he learns of the letter, so Katy, a former Air Force officer herself, decides to re-enlist so they can stay together.

Trouble is, Greg flunks his physical exam due to a bad knee. Katy is shipped to a base in Hawaii without him. Female neighbors keep suggesting Katy will be lonely and surrounded by handsome servicemen, so Greg flies to Honolulu to join her. He ends up spending hours with the wives, a situation their husbands don't appreciate.

Greg decides to sabotage Katy's career so she can get a discharge. His stunt backfires, but because Greg's knee has healed, he is now recalled up to duty. Which would be fine, except Katy now needs to be honorably discharged and sent home because she is pregnant.

== Cast ==
- Tom Ewell as Gregory Whitcomb
- Sheree North as Lt. Katy Whitcomb
- Rita Moreno as Sandra Roberts
- Rick Jason as Capt. Barney Sloan
- Les Tremayne as Henry 'Hank' Gaxton
- Alice Reinheart as Capt. Grace Briggs
- Gregory Walcott as Lt. Sweeney
- Jean Willes as Joan Sweeney
- Edward Platt as Major Dunning
- Jacqueline Fontaine as Buxom Blonde at Party
- Michael Ross as Military Policeman
- Arthur Q. Bryan as Mr. Curtis
- Keith Vincent as Delivery boy
- Janice Carroll as WAAF sergeant
- Ralph Sanford as Gateman

== Background ==
The film was known as The Camp Follower and was going to be made by Henry Levin with Clifton Webb. Then it was made by Frank Tashlin with Tom Ewell.

The Lieutenant Wore Skirts was conceived as a leading vehicle for actress Sheree North, who was being promoted by 20th Century-Fox as an alternative to the increasingly difficult Marilyn Monroe. The project originated in the fall of 1955, soon after North's breakthrough in How to Be Very, Very Popular (1955), a role intended for Monroe, but one she turned down. The studio attached popular director Frank Tashlin and comedian Tom Ewell (Monroe's leading man in The Seven Year Itch) to work alongside North, in an effort to ensure the film would be successful. Tashlin had the film's script tailored to fit North's talents, and molded his story along the lines of the popular romantic comedies of the era. The film was Buddy Adler's first film under his Fox contract.

During production, the role of Sandra, the sultry upstairs neighbor, was intended for African-American actress Dorothy Dandridge. Two years earlier, Dandridge had achieved fame for her performance in Carmen Jones and her resulting Academy Award nomination. Fox head Darryl F. Zanuck was, at the time, in the process of gradually promoting Dandridge into being accepted by contemporary white audiences. Zanuck had assigned her the role in The Lieutenant Wore Skirts and that of Tuptim in the film version of The King and I, and was planning to cast her in modernized remakes of The Blue Angel and Under Two Flags. However, Otto Preminger, Dandridge's former director and now-lover, convinced her to turn down the supporting roles in The Lieutenant Wore Skirts and The King and I, insisting she was now above playing smaller roles since she had proven herself a box office star. As a result, Dandridge was replaced by Rita Moreno as Sandra and Tuptim, and her career started its slow, but steady decline.

== See also ==
- List of American films of 1956
