= Sheree North =

American actress, dancer, and singer (1932–2005)

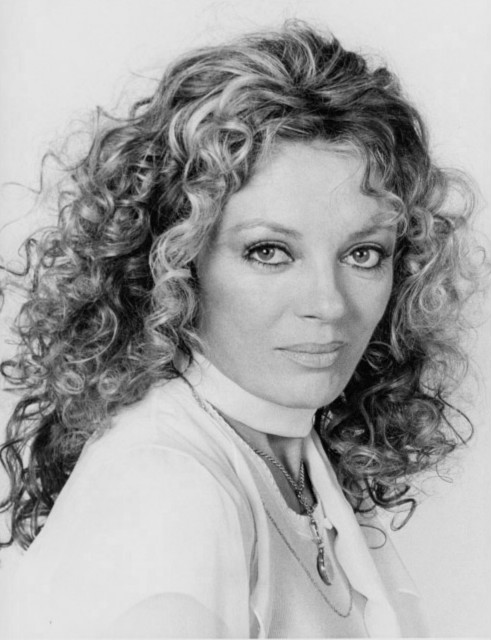
- North in 1975
- Born: Dawn Shirley Crang; January 17, 1932; Los Angeles, California, U.S.
- Died: November 4, 2005 (aged 73); Los Angeles, California, U.S.
- Other names: Dawn Shirley Bethel; Sherree Bessire; Shirley Mae Bessire
- Occupations: Actress; singer; dancer
- Years active: 1951–2000
- Known for: The Lieutenant Wore Skirts
- Spouses: Fred Bessire (m. 1948; div. 1953) John "Bud" Freeman (m. 1955; div. 1956) Dr. Gerhardt Sommer (m. 1958; div. 1963) Phillip Alan Norman (m. 2003)
- Children: 2

Sheree North (born Dawn Shirley Crang; January 17, 1932 – November 4, 2005) was an American actress, dancer, and singer, known for being one of 20th Century-Fox's intended successors to Marilyn Monroe.

== Early life ==
North was born Dawn Shirley Crang in Los Angeles, California, on January 17, 1932, the daughter of June (née Shoard) and Richard Crang. Following her mother's remarriage to Edward Bethel, she was known as Dawn Shirley Bethel.

== Career ==
=== Beginnings ===
North made her film début as an uncredited extra in Excuse My Dust (1951). She was then spotted by a choreographer performing at the Macayo Club in Santa Monica, and was cast as a chorus girl in the film Here Come the Girls (1953), starring Bob Hope. Around that time, she adopted the stage name Sheree North. She made her Broadway début in the musical Hazel Flagg, for which she won a Theatre World Award. She reprised her role in the film version, Living It Up (1954), starring Dean Martin and Jerry Lewis. In early 1954, at age 22, she appeared in a live TV version of Cole Porter's Anything Goes on The Colgate Comedy Hour, with Ethel Merman, Frank Sinatra, and Bert Lahr.

=== 20th Century-Fox ===
In 1954, North signed a four-year contract with 20th Century-Fox. The studio had big plans for her, hoping to groom her as a replacement for the studio's leading—and increasingly uncontrollable—female star Marilyn Monroe. Fox tested North for leading roles in two of their upcoming productions, The Girl in Pink Tights and There's No Business Like Show Business—two films that had been offered to Monroe—while North was wearing Monroe's own studio wardrobe. After her screen tests, though, North was not cast in either film. In March 1954, North had a brush with scandal when she was revealed to have once danced in a bikini in an 8 mm erotic film. Fox capitalized on the publicity, as the studio had with Monroe's nude calendar posing in 1952.

In 1955, she was assigned the lead role opposite Betty Grable in How to Be Very, Very Popular (1955), a role that Marilyn Monroe had refused. Media attention surrounding Monroe's suspension and North's hiring resulted in North appearing on the cover of Life with the cover line "Sheree North Takes Over from Marilyn Monroe". How to Be Very, Very Popular did not live up to the hype Fox had generated, though North had appeared on What's My Line? to publicize the film and had been asked point-blank by one of the panelists if she had been associated with Monroe. The movie received mixed reviews from critics and was a moderate box-office success. Despite this, film historians, then and now, cite North's electrically charged dancing to "Shake, Rattle and Roll" as the film's most memorable scene.

Sheree North on the cover of Life (March 21, 1955)

In an attempt to promote North, Fox studio executives lobbied to cast her in films with popular stars. The studio had campaigned to cast her in a film with comedian Tom Ewell, hoping to repeat the success he had with Monroe in The Seven Year Itch (1955). Soon thereafter, the studio assigned North and Ewell to appear together in the romantic comedy The Lieutenant Wore Skirts, plotting the story of an army lieutenant whose husband tries to get her discharged. To promote the film, North posed for several publicity shots showing her legs. When the majority of the shots were released, only her legs appeared, with the tagline "Believe it or not, these legs belong to an army lieutenant." The film premiered with much fanfare in January 1956 and became a box-office success, grossing over $4 million in the United States.

North's follow-up was The Best Things in Life Are Free (1956), a lavish musical in which her singing voice was dubbed by Eileen Wilson. She received fourth billing under Gordon MacRae, Dan Dailey, and Ernest Borgnine. It was an attempt by the studio to broaden North's audience appeal, and while it earned favorable reviews from critics, it did not become the success for which Fox had hoped. In 1956, Fox signed another blonde bombshell in the person of Broadway actress Jayne Mansfield to a contract and began promoting her instead of North. Although Fox gradually lost interest in North, the studio continued to offer her a string of films. She was offered the lead role in a film called The Girl Upstairs, in which she would have parodied Monroe's on-screen persona.

When North's agent suggested she decline the film, Fox put her on suspension for two months. When her suspension was lifted one month later, North agreed to appear in The Way to the Gold, but only on the assurance that Elvis Presley would be her co-star. When Presley withdrew due to salary disagreements, he was replaced by Jeffrey Hunter, with whom North often quarreled. In the film, North attempted to progress from her blonde bombshell image, playing a sarcastic waitress, and while the film drew mixed reviews, it was a box-office success.

She next starred in No Down Payment (1957), a melodrama about the lives of multiple families living in a California subdivision. Tony Randall played her alcoholic husband in the film. Although critically acclaimed, it was not a box-office success. The following year, she appeared in her final two films for Fox. In Love and War (1958) was a war drama film pairing her again with Jeffrey Hunter, and also with Robert Wagner, Dana Wynter, and Hope Lange. It was not a critical or financial success. Although the musical film genre had declined in profitability, she next co-starred in Mardi Gras (1958) with Pat Boone and Tommy Sands. It was her final film under her contract.

=== Later years ===
After North's contract with Fox ended in 1958, her career stalled, although she continued to act in films, on television, and on the stage throughout the rest of her life. She guest-starred on episodes of The Untouchables and Gunsmoke (both 1963). North joined the cast of I Can Get It for You Wholesale in 1962, which featured Elliott Gould and introduced Barbra Streisand. She later guest-starred on a series of popular television series, including Ben Casey, Burke's Law (1963–65), The Virginian (1964–66), The Big Valley, The Iron Horse (both 1966), and The Fugitive (1965–67).

After an eight-year absence from film acting, North accepted a lead role in the B-movie science-fiction film Destination Inner Space (1966). The film opened to only a minor release in 1966 and has rarely been seen since. North co-starred with Elvis Presley in one of his final films, The Trouble with Girls (1969).

When she was not working in films, she worked in musicals and many other theatrical productions. She appeared on Broadway doing a lively routine in the musical Hazel Flagg (1953) and won a Theatre World Award. This led directly to her being cast in the film Living It Up (1954). In 1962, she appeared on Broadway as Martha Mills in I Can Get It for You Wholesale, with Jack Kruschen, Elliott Gould, and Barbra Streisand in her Broadway debut. North also appeared in productions of Irma La Douce, Bye Bye Birdie, and Can-Can. In 1965, she took over from Shirley Knight in a Los Angeles production of Dutchman that coincided with the 1965 Watts riots. The production was controversial and was blamed by conservatives for inciting unrest. It was picketed, ads in newspapers were blocked, and North's car was set on fire. Despite that, the production ran for a year.

From the 1960s onward, North focused mainly on becoming a solid and versatile character actress, appearing on almost every television Western, cop show, and medical drama produced from the 1960s through the 1990s. She displayed a talent for comic timing on many of the situation comedies of the era. She was a favorite in several made-for-television movies. She also earned Emmy nominations for appearances on Marcus Welby, M.D. (1969) and Archie Bunker's Place (1979).

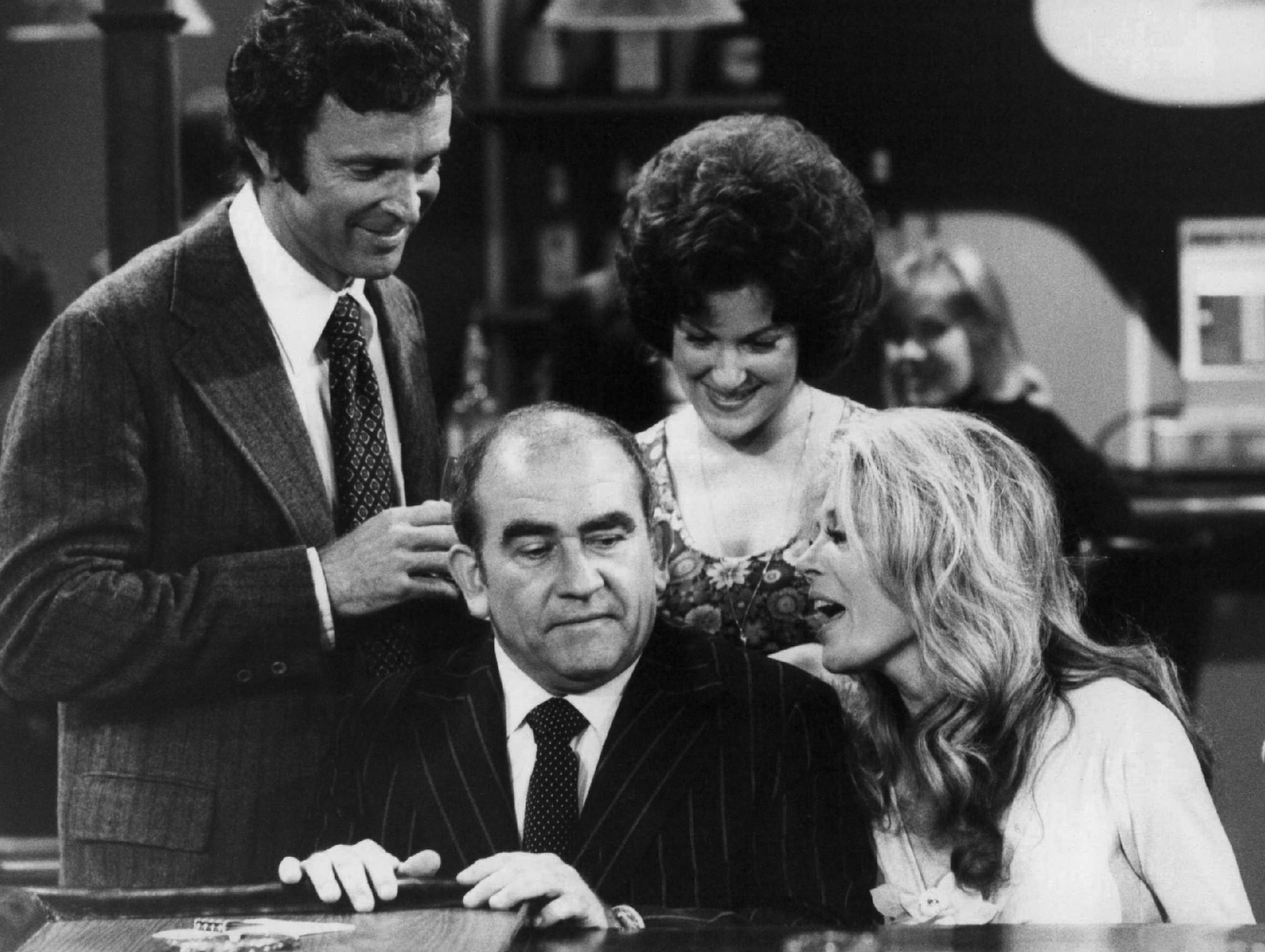
Ed Asner as Lou Grant and Sheree North as Charlene Maguire, his new girlfriend, in a fifth-season episode of The Mary Tyler Moore Show

A favorite of film producer/director Don Siegel, she appeared in four of his films: in Madigan (1968) opposite Richard Widmark; in Charley Varrick (1973) with Walter Matthau; as John Wayne's long-lost love in the actor's final film The Shootist (1976); and in Telefon (1977). She had supporting roles in two Charles Bronson movies, Breakout (1975) with Robert Duvall, and Telefon. Other notable performances were in The Gypsy Moths (1969) with Burt Lancaster and Gene Hackman; and as Burt Lancaster's ex-lover in Michael Winner's Western, Lawman (1971) with Robert Ryan, Lee J. Cobb, Robert Duvall, and Albert Salmi. She also appeared in the crime drama The Organization (1971) with Sidney Poitier, and in The Outfit (1973) with Duvall, Joe Don Baker, and Karen Black.

Throughout the 1970s and 1980s, North appeared in guest spots on TV shows, including Hawaii Five-O, The Streets of San Francisco, McMillan & Wife, Matlock, Family, and Magnum, P.I.. She played Lou Grant's girlfriend in several episodes of The Mary Tyler Moore Show. She co-starred with Sheldon Leonard in the short-lived CBS sitcom Big Eddie in 1975. During the 1980–81 season, North starred in I'm a Big Girl Now with Diana Canova, Danny Thomas, and Martin Short. The series aired 19 episodes. In 1980, she played Marilyn Monroe's mother in the made-for-television film Marilyn: The Untold Story. In 1983, she appeared in the ensemble cast of Steven Bochco's series Bay City Blues. The hour-long drama series aired eight episodes. North later appeared in two episodes of The Golden Girls as Blanche Devereaux's sister Virginia.

In the 1990s, she appeared as Cosmo Kramer's mother Babs Kramer in two episodes of the sitcom Seinfeld. Her last screen role was in John Landis' black comedy Susan's Plan (1998).

== Personal life and death ==
North was married four times and had two children. In 1948, at age 16, she married Fred Bessire, a draftsman, with whom she had a daughter. The marriage ended in 1953. In 1955, she married television writer Bud Freeman; the marriage ended a year later. Her third marriage, in 1958, was to a psychologist, Gerhardt Sommer, with whom she had another daughter in July 1959. The marriage ended in divorce in 1963. At the time of her death, North was married to her fourth husband, Emmy Award-winning title designer Phillip "Phill" Norman.

In Hollywood, the future Pulitzer Prize-winning novelist Alison Lurie worked as Sheree's secretary answering her fan mail. Lurie later told American Legends website that she modeled a character on Sheree North in her classic L.A. novel, The Nowhere City.

On November 4, 2005, aged 73, North died of complications following surgery at Cedars-Sinai Medical Center.

== Theatre ==
- Hazel Flagg (February 11, 1953 – September 19, 1953)
- I Can Get It for You Wholesale (March 22, 1962 – December 8, 1962)
- The Glass Menagerie (Laguna-Moulton Playhouse – January 3, 2000)

== Filmography ==
=== Features ===
Year	Title	Role	Notes
1951	Excuse My Dust	Six Girl Club Member	Uncredited
1953	Here Come the Girls	Chorine with Elephant	Uncredited
1954	Living It Up	Jitterbug Dancer	
1954	The Girl in Pink Tights		Uncompleted
1955	How to Be Very, Very Popular	Curly Flagg	
1956	The Lieutenant Wore Skirts	Lieutenant Katy Whitcomb	
1956	The Best Things in Life Are Free	Kitty Kane	
1957	The Way to the Gold	Henrietta 'Hank' Clifford, waitress	
1957	No Down Payment	Isabelle Flagg	
1958	In Love and War	Lorraine	
1958	Mardi Gras	Eadie West	
1966	Destination Inner Space	Dr. Rene Peron	
1968	Madigan	Jonesy	
1969	The Gypsy Moths	Waitress	
1969	The Trouble with Girls	Nita Bix	
1970	Io sono la legge		
1971	Lawman	Laura Shelby	
1971	The Organization	Mrs. Morgan	
1973	Charley Varrick	Jewell Everett	
1973	The Outfit	Buck's Wife	
1975	Breakout	Myrna	
1976	The Shootist	Serepta	
1976	Survival	Sheree	
1977	Telefon	Marie Wills	
1978	Rabbit Test	Mystery Lady	
1979	Only Once in a Lifetime	Sally	
1988	Maniac Cop	Sally Noland	
1990	Cold Dog Soup	Mrs. Hughes	
1991	Defenseless	Mrs. Bodeck	
1998	Susan's Plan	Mrs. Beyers	

=== Television ===
- The Bing Crosby Show (CBS, January 3, 1954) as Herself
- The Colgate Comedy Hour (1954) (Season 4 Episode 22: "Anything Goes") as Bonnie
- Shower of Stars (1954) (Season 1 Episode 2: "Lend an Ear")
- What's My Line? (1955) as Herself
- Playhouse 90 (1957) (Season 2 Episode 3: "Topaze") as Suzy
- The Witness (1961) (Season 1 Episode 14: "Ma Barker") as Blossom Knight
- The Untouchables (1963) (Season 4 Episode 13: "Search for a Dead Man") as Claire Simmons
- Gunsmoke (1963) (Season 9 Episode 2: "Lover Boy") as Avis Fisher
- The Eleventh Hour (1963) (Season 2 Episode 11: "There Should Be an Outfit Called 'Families Anonymous'!") as Peggy Lewis
- Breaking Point (1963) (2 episodes)
  - (Season 1 Episode 1: "Solo for B-Flat Clarinet") as Lisa Adams
  - (Season 1 Episode 15: "Don't Cry, Baby, Don't Cry") as Susan Beaumont
- The Great Adventure (1964) (Season 1 Episode 12: "Wild Bill Hickok- the Legend and the Man") as Agnes Lake
- Ben Casey (1963–1964) (2 episodes)
  - (Season 3 Episode 1: "For This Relief, Much Thanks") (1963) as Lisa Adams
  - (Season 3 Episode 28: "Dress My Doll Pretty") (1964) as Gloria Cooper
- The Greatest Show on Earth (1964) (Season 1 Episode 28: "This Train Don't Stop Till It Gets There") as Gloria
- Burke's Law (1963–1965) (3 episodes)
  - (Season 1 Episode 10: "Who Killed the Kind Doctor?") (1963) as Myrtle 'Gigi' String
  - (Season 2 Episode 15: "Who Killed Davidian Jonas?") (1964) as The Maharani of Kooshipoo
  - (Season 2 Episode 19: "Who Killed Rosie Sunset?") (1965) as Cleo Delaney
- The Loner (1965) (Season 1 Episode 14: "Escort for a Dead Man") as Cora Rice
- The Virginian (1964–1966) (2 episodes)
  - (Season 2 Episode 24: "Another's Footsteps") (1964) as Karen Anders
  - (Season 4 Episode 27: "That Saunders Woman") (1966) as Della Saunders
- Run for Your Life (1966) (Season 2 Episode 1: "The Day Time Stopped") as Jeannie Lake
- The Big Valley (1966) (Season 2 Episode 9: "The Man from Nowhere") as Libby Mathews
- The Iron Horse (1966) (Season 1 Episode 15: "A Dozen Ways to Kill a Man") as Alix Henderson
- Code Name: Heraclitus (1967, TV movie) as Sally
- Bob Hope Presents the Chrysler Theatre (1965–1967) (3 episodes)
  - (Season 3 Episode 2: "The Crime") (1965) as Mary
  - (Season 4 Episode 13: "Code Name: Heraclitus - Part 1") (1966) as Sally
  - (Season 4 Episode 14: "Code Name: Heraclitus - Part 2") (1967) as Sally
- The Fugitive (1965–1967) (2 episodes)
  - (Season 3 Episode 8: "An Apple a Day") (1965) as Marianne Adams
  - (Season 4 Episode 27: "The Walls of Night") (1967) as Willy
- Mannix (1968) (Season 2 Episode 2: "Comes Up Rose") as Rose Anderson
- Here Come the Brides (1968) (Season 1 Episode 5: "A Hard Card to Play") as Felicia
- Then Came Bronson (1969) (Pilot Episode) as Gloria Oresko
- My Friend Tony (1969) (Season 1 Episode 12: "Computer Murder") as Vivian
- The Name of the Game (1970) (Season 2 Episode 25: "One of the Girls in Research") as Mrs. Palmer
- The Most Deadly Game (1970) (Season 1 Episode 5: "Who Killed Kindness?") as Lottie
- The Interns (1971) (Season 1 Episode 18: "The Challenger") as Beth Calico
- Vanished (1971, TV movie) as Beverly West
- The Smith Family (1971) (Season 2 Episode 4: "Lost Lady") as Peggy Manners
- Alias Smith and Jones (1972) (Season 2 Episode 18: "The Men That Corrupted Hadleyburg") as Bess Tapscott
- Rolling Man (1972, TV movie) as Ruby
- Cannon (1972) (Season 2 Episode 5: "Stakeout") as Millie Carroll
- Jigsaw (1972) (Season 1 Episode 4: "Finder's Fee")
- Trouble Comes to Town (1973, TV movie) as Mrs. Murdock
- McMillan & Wife (1973) (Season 2 Episode 5: "No Hearts, No Flowers") as Dr. Marion Voight
- Snatched (1973, TV movie) as Kim Sutter
- Kung Fu (1973) (Season 1 Episode 14: "The Third Man") as Noreen Gallagher
- Owen Marshall: Counselor at Law (1973) (Season 3 Episode 3: "The Pool House") as Evelyn Knight
- Hawkins (1973) (Season 1 Episode 1: "Murder in Movieland") as Debbie Lane
- The Streets of San Francisco (1973) (Season 2 Episode 5: "Going Home") as Donna Coughlin
- Maneater (1973, TV movie) as Gloria Baron
- Key West (1973, TV movie) as Brandi
- Hec Ramsey (1974) (Season 2 Episode 3: "Dead Heat") as Esther Helpinstall
- Winter Kill (1974, TV movie) as Betty
- Kojak (1974) (2 episodes) as Mrs. Giancana
  - (Season 2 Episode 1: "The Chinatown Murders: Part 1")
  - (Season 2 Episode 2: "The Chinatown Murders: Part 2")
- Hawaii Five-O (1974) (Season 7 Episode 2: "A Hawaiian Nightmare") as Doris Brown
- Barnaby Jones (1974) (Season 3 Episode 6: "Forfeit by Death") as Roxy Morgan
- Wide World of Mystery (1974) (Episode: "The Cloning of Clifford Swimmer") as Mrs. Janet Swimmer
- The Lives of Benjamin Franklin (1974) (Episode: "The Whirlwind") as older Deborah Franklin
- Movin' On (1974) (2 episodes) as Dinah
  - (Season 1 Episode 12: "Goin' Home: Part 1")
  - (Season 1 Episode 13: "Goin' Home: Part 2")
- The Mary Tyler Moore Show (1974–1975) (2 episodes) as Charlene Maguire
  - (Season 5 Episode 4: "Lou and That Woman") (1974)
  - (Season 5 Episode 19: "The Shame of the Cities") (1975)
- A Shadow in the Streets (1975, TV movie) as Gina Pulaski
- Medical Center (1971–1975) (3 episodes)
  - (Season 3 Episode 15: "Shock! Part 1") (1971) as Karen Porter
  - (Season 3 Episode 16: "Shock! Part 2") (1972) as Karen Porter
  - (Season 6 Episode 23: "Half a Life") (1975) as Sylvia Ronston
- Big Eddie (1975) (10 episodes) as Honey Smith
- Marcus Welby, M.D. (1976) (Season 7 Episode 16: "How Do You Know What Hurts Me?") as June Monica
- Most Wanted (1976) (Pilot Episode) as Melissa Dawson
- Family (1976) (Season 2 Episode 9: "On the First Day of Christmas") as Constance Hume
- Baretta (1977) (Season 3 Episode 22: "Big Bad Charlie") as Amy
- Future Cop (1977) (Season 1 Episode 4: "Carlisle Girl") as Claire Hammond
- Westside Medical (1977) (2 episodes) as Laurie
  - (Season 1 Episode 9: "My Physician, My Friend: Part 1")
  - (Season 1 Episode 10: "My Physician, My Friend: Part 2")
- Hallmark Hall of Fame Have I Got a Christmas for You (1977) as Adele Serkin
- The Night They Took Miss Beautiful (1977, TV movie) as Layla Burden
- Fantasy Island (1978) (Season 1 Episode 5: "The Prince/The Sheriff") as Julie
- A Real American Hero (1978, TV movie) as Carrie Todd
- Amateur Night at the Dixie Bar and Grill (1979, TV movie) as Lettie Norman
- Women in White (1979, TV movie) as Lisa Gordon
- Portrait of a Stripper aka The Secret Life of Susie Hanson (1979, TV movie) as Sally Evers
- Archie Bunker's Place (1979) (2 episodes) as Dotty Wertz
  - (Season 1 Episode 4: "Archie and the Oldest Profession")
  - (Season 1 Episode 12: "Barney and the Hooker")
- A Christmas for Boomer (1979, TV movie) as Dorothy
- Marilyn: The Untold Story (1980, TV movie) as Gladys Baker
- I'm a Big Girl Now (1980-1981) (16 episodes) as Edie McKendrick
- Legs (1983, TV movie) as Ida
- Bay City Blues (1983-1984) (8 episodes) as Lynn Holtz
- Magnum, P.I. (1984) (Season 4 Episode 16: "The Return of Luther Gillis") as Blanche Rafferty
- Scorned and Swindled (1984, TV movie) as Maxine Wagner
- Trapper John, M.D. (1985) (Season 6 Episode 18: "The Unholy Ghost") as Tilly Whiteside
- ABC Afterschool Special (1986) (Season 14 Episode 6: "Are You My Mother?") as Madelyn
- Matlock (1986) (2 episodes) as Alice Jenkins
  - (Season 1 Episode 6: "The Don: Part 1")
  - (Season 1 Episode 7: "The Don: Part 2")
- Murder, She Wrote (1987) (Season 3 Episode 18: "No Laughing Murder") as Norma Lewis
- Jake Spanner, Private Eye (1989, TV movie) as Mrs. Bernstein
- Freddy's Nightmares (1989) (Season 2 Episode 8: "Bloodlines") as Joyce Burton
- Hunter (1989) (Season 6 Episode 8: "Shield of Honor") as Dorothy Nickens
- The Golden Girls (1985–1989) (2 episodes) as Virginia Hollingsworth
  - (Season 1 Episode 4: "Transplant") (1985)
  - (Season 5 Episode 11: "Ebb Tide") (1989)
- Dead on the Money (1991, TV movie)
- Seinfeld (1995–1998) (2 episodes) as Babs Kramer
  - (Season 6 Episode 11: "The Switch") (1995)
  - (Season 9 Episode 22: "The Finale") (1998)

== Awards and honors ==
Theatre World Award

- Won: For performance in Hazel Flagg (1953)

Emmy Award

- Nominated: Outstanding Lead Actress for a Single Appearance in a Drama or Comedy Series, Marcus Welby, M.D. episode "How Do You Know What Hurts Me?" (1976)
- Nominated: Outstanding Lead Actress in a Comedy Series, Archie Bunker's Place (1980)
