= Eileen Wilson =

American singer (1923–2018)

Eileen Wilson (born Eileen Eshelman; January 15, 1923 – September 9, 2018) was an American big band singer, and one of the original stars of the 1950s television show Your Hit Parade on NBC. She also starred on the Hit Parade radio show.

== Early years ==
Wilson was born in San Diego, California. Her parents were Lieutenant Commander and Mrs. W.W. Eshelman of San Diego, California. She went to schools in New York City and in California and received a bachelor's degree in music at the University of California, Los Angeles. During her years in college, she sang on a radio station in Los Angeles, California, and changed her name to Eileen Wilson, taking her voice coach's last name.

== Career ==
Wilson was one of the singers featured on The Bob Crosby Show and the Beulah program, both on radio.

Prior to starring on the Hit Parade TV show, she had been featured on the show's radio version. From 1948, when she first joined the radio program, until 1949, her co-star was Frank Sinatra. Wilson sang on the radio show until 1951. Before her Hit Parade years, she was a vocalist with the Skitch Henderson and Les Brown orchestras. Her husband, Ray Kellogg, also sang with the Henderson and Brown orchestras.

In 1950, while singing on the Hit Parade radio program, Wilson became one of the original starring vocalists—with Snooky Lanson and Dorothy Collins—on the TV version of the show. She sang on the Hit Parade TV show until 1952.

In the fall of 1952, Wilson was replaced on the TV program by singer June Valli. Valli sang on the show for one season, and was replaced by singer Gisele MacKenzie.

Wilson dubbed many actors, including Ava Gardner in One Touch of Venus and The Hucksters, Jayne Mansfield in The Girl Can't Help It, Sheree North in The Best Things in Life Are Free (film), and Barbara Bel Geddes in The Five Pennies, among others.

Wilson recorded the song "I'll Plant My Own Tree" for the soundtrack recording of Valley of the Dolls (1967). In the movie itself, Margaret Whiting's voice was used as a ghost singer for Susan Hayward, but Wilson recorded the song for the official movie soundtrack.

Wilson participated in Time-Life's "Swing Era" recording sessions, led by arranger/leader Billy May on a series of recordings that recreated music recorded during the Big Band Era. The series sought to have the original singers re-record their hits in high fidelity stereo—a technology not available during the 1930s and 1940s—but where the original female singer was unavailable, Wilson stood in for the original female vocalist. For those recordings, she sang note-for-note recreations of songs such as "A Sunday Kind of Love" (which had been a hit for vocalist Fran Warren with the Claude Thornhill Orchestra) in the style of the original singer.

In 1972, she performed (along with Hit Parade stars Gisele MacKenzie, Snooky Lanson, and Russell Arms) on an ABC-TV special, Zenith Presents: A Salute to Television's 25th Anniversary. In 1975, she appeared on an episode of the program ABC Late Night; the episode, which featured former stars of the Hit Parade, commemorated the television show's 25th anniversary.

== Personal life and death ==
Wilson died on September 9, 2018, in Everett, Washington, aged 95.
