= Roxanne (model) =

American model and actress (1929–2024)

- Born: Dolores Evelyn Rosedale; March 20, 1929; Minneapolis, Minnesota, U.S.
- Died: May 2, 2024 (aged 95); Spring Park, Minnesota, U.S.
- Occupations: Model, actress
- Notable work: Beat the Clock; The Seven Year Itch

Dolores Evelyn Rosedale (March 20, 1929 – May 2, 2024), known professionally as Roxanne, was an American model and actress.

== Biography ==
Roxanne was the daughter of Kenneth and Thyra Rosedale. She studied fashion design at the Minneapolis School of Art and was a member of the Minneapolis Models Guild. She moved to New York and studied at Actors' Studio and then joined the Screen Actors Guild.

She was the blonde assistant on the Bud Collyer-hosted original version of the Goodson-Todman Productions game show Beat the Clock. Roxanne was replaced by Beverly Bentley in August 1955. Roxanne did not use a surname in her professional work. She was on the cover of magazines around the world include, Life, Look, Paris Match, TV Guide, and dozens of newspaper articles.

Roxanne had a doll fashioned after her which was called The Roxanne Doll. It was a hard plastic doll which stood 18 inches (46 cm) tall. It had movable legs which allowed the doll to "walk". They were manufactured circa 1953 by the Valentine Company. The blue-eyed doll had a Beat the Clock tag on the doll's wrist and came with a miniature red camera. She would give these dolls to the contestants' daughters on Beat the Clock.

She made her dramatic television debut on April 23, 1952, in the "Double Entry" episode of Casey, Crime Photographer. She also appeared in a small role in Billy Wilder's The Seven Year Itch (1955).

On March 13, 1954, she married finance executive Tom Roddy in New York. Roxanne died in Spring Park, Minnesota, on May 2, 2024, at the age of 95.

== Filmography ==
Year	Title	Role	Notes
1955	The Seven Year Itch	Elaine	
1957	The Young Don't Cry	Mrs. Maureen Cole	Final film role
