= Big Eddie =

American television sitcom

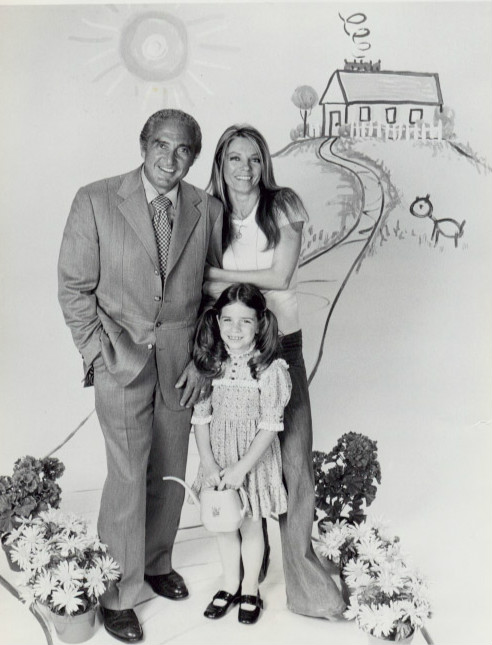
- Publicity photo of Sheldon Leonard, Sheree North, and Quinn Cummings in Big Eddie
- Created by: Bill Persky; Sam Denoff
- Written by: Roy Kammerman; Sid Dorfman; Simon Muntner; Jerry Davis; Jay Folb; Richard Powell
- Directed by: Hy Averback
- Starring: Sheldon Leonard
- Composer: Jonathan Wolff
- Country of origin: United States
- Original language: English
- No. of seasons: 1
- No. of episodes: 10

Production
- Producer: Hy Averback
- Camera setup: Multi-camera
- Running time: 30 minutes

Original release
- Network: CBS
- Release: August 23 – November 7, 1975

Big Eddie is an American television sitcom that aired on CBS from August 23 until November 7, 1975. Its first three episodes, in a Saturday night time slot, did well in the ratings, but after it was moved to Friday nights, it had little success opposite Sanford and Son.

== Premise ==
Big Eddie Smith, a reformed mobster tries to go legit as the owner of the Big E Sports Arena in New York City. Smith's family included his wife Honey, granddaughter Ginger, and brother Jessie.

== Cast ==
- Sheldon Leonard as Big Eddie Smith
- Sheree North as Honey Smith
- Quinn Cummings as Ginger Smith
- Billy Sands as Bang Bang Valentine
- Alan Oppenheimer as Jesse Smith
- Ralph Wilcox as Raymond McKay
- Lonnie Shorr as Too Late
- Milton Parsons as The Goniff
- Cliff Pellow as No Marbles

== Episodes ==
No.	Title	Directed by	Written by	Original release date
1	"Man of the Year"	Unknown	Unknown	August 23, 1975
A reporter attempts to get the low-down on the checkered past of Eddie and his retinue.
2	"One Nation Invisible"	Unknown	Unknown	August 30, 1975
To show how the law guarantees justice for everyone, Big Eddie helps his granddaughter sue the merchant who sold her a defective toy.
3	"Hello Poppa"	Unknown	Unknown	September 6, 1975
An engaging young man from Italy claims that Eddie is the long-lost GI who married his mother-- and fathered him during World War II. Jack Carter, Cliff Norton, Ed Peck, and Ron Silver guest star.
4	"Too Many Grandmothers (a.k.a. One Grandmother Too Many)"	Unknown	Unknown	September 19, 1975
Big Eddie is surprised by a visit from his first wife, a Hungarian aristocrat (Eva Gabor) who has the kind of designs not designed to please his current loving spouse.
5	"Who Am I?"	Unknown	Unknown	September 26, 1975
Honey wrestles with an identity crisis-- and by Eddie with a marital crisis-- when she has to write a sociology class paper on "Who Am I?"
6	"Crashing Violet"	Unknown	Unknown	October 3, 1975
A smitten Bang Bang persuades Eddie to hire a maid: the waitress (Alice Ghostley) who lost her job because she dropped a plate of beans on Bang Bang's head.
7	"Eddie Makes a Speech"	Unknown	Unknown	October 10, 1975
A chum from Eddie's rough-and-tumble school days (Ron Feinberg) is now a high-school principal, and he'd like Eddie to say a few words to kids who are even rougher than they were.
8	"One of Our Red Shoes is Missing"	Unknown	Unknown	October 24, 1975
The Smiths risk creating an international flap by harboring a Soviet dancer (Sandy Ignon) who wants to defect.
9	"Alone Together"	Unknown	Unknown	October 31, 1975
With granddaughter Ginger off to a slumber party, the Smith's look forward to an undisturbed evening of champagne, caviar and romance. The only obstacle remaining is their live-in retainer Bang Bang.
10	"A Date with Eddie"	Unknown	Unknown	November 7, 1975
Eddie is in the doghouse. After asking his granddaughter out on her first big date, he has to stand her up. Ronnie Schell guest stars as a clown.

== Production ==
Bill Persky and Sam Denoff created the series and were Big Eddie's executive producers and writers. Hy Averback was the producer and director. It had three "sneak preview" broadcasts (August 23 - September 6, 1975) from 8:30 to 9 p.m. Eastern Time on Saturdays. Ratings decreased after it was moved to 8 - 8:30 p.m. ET on Fridays beginning on September 19, 1975.

Episodes were recorded on videotape in front of a live audience using facilities at KTLA-TV.

== Critical response ==
John J. O'Connor, in a review distributed by the New York Times Service, commented, ". . . to know Big Eddie is to loath it." The review implied that Eddie married Honey as a means of obtaining custody of his granddaughter, "who, for purposes of uncomplicated plotting, is conveniently orphaned." O'Connor commented that Eddie often shouted and that his speech was filled with pronunciations such as "'dat' for that, or 'foist' for first" and he added, "His black assistant (Ralph Wilcox) jive talks hysterically."

After watching four episodes, Lee Winfrey wrote in The Evening Sun, "The only thing large about Big Eddie is growing wonder as to why it is still on the air." The review added that "each week the plots grow more surpassingly stupid, the guest stars less interesting, and the whole show steadily more arthritic in pace." The title character was called "as dull as a reformed drunk" and the family's home life was summarized as "dull domesticity, just another unbelievable sitcom family, wrestling with piffling problems and pennywhistle crises."
