= I'm a Big Girl Now =

American television series 1980-1981

- Genre: Sitcom
- Created by: Susan Harris
- Starring: Diana Canova; Danny Thomas; Rori King; Sheree North; Martin Short; Michael Durrell; Deborah Baltzell
- Opening theme: "I'm a Big Girl Now" performed by Diana Canova
- Composer: George Tipton
- Country of origin: United States
- Original language: English
- No. of seasons: 1
- No. of episodes: 19

Production
- Executive producers: Paul Junger Witt; Tony Thomas; Susan Harris
- Running time: 30 minutes
- Production company: Witt/Thomas/Harris Productions

Original release
- Network: ABC
- Release: October 31, 1980 – May 8, 1981

I'm a Big Girl Now is an American sitcom that aired on ABC from October 31, 1980, until May 8, 1981. Reruns then continued until July 24, 1981. Soap creator Susan Harris and producers Paul Junger Witt and Tony Thomas developed the series as a star vehicle for Diana Canova following her success playing Corinne Tate Flotsky on Soap, although I'm a Big Girl Now is not a Soap spinoff.

Canova sings the show's theme song, which was written by Leslie Bricusse and George Tipton.

== Synopsis ==
Diana Cassidy, a young divorcée and mother, and her daughter Becky move into the home of her recently single father Benjamin Douglas, a dentist.

== Cast ==
- Diana Canova as Diana Cassidy
- Danny Thomas as Dr. Benjamin Douglas D.D.S.
- Rori King as Becky Cassidy
- Sheree North as Edie McKendrick
- Martin Short as Neal Stryker
- Deborah Baltzell as Karen Hawks
- Michael Durrell as Walter Douglas

== Episodes ==
No.	Title	Directed by	Written by	Original release date
1	"Pilot"	Noam Pitlik	Susan Harris	October 31, 1980
2	"Daddy's Girl"	John Bowab	Susan Seeger	November 7, 1980
3	"Career Vs. Kid"	John Bowab	Judy Pioli & Paula A. Roth	November 14, 1980
4	"Younger Than Springtime"	John Bowab	Barbara Benedek	November 21, 1980
5	"Singles Bar"	John Bowab	Barbara Benedek	November 28, 1980
6	"Walter Comes Home"	John Bowab	Unknown	December 12, 1980
7	"The First Christmas"	John Bowab	Deborah Leschin	December 19, 1980
8	"Fear and Loathing in Georgetown"	Doug Rogers	Deborah Leschin	January 9, 1981
9	"Best Friends"	Doug Rogers	Deborah Leschin	January 16, 1981
10	"Let's Give Ben a Hand"	Doug Rogers	Marc Sotkin	January 23, 1981
11	"It's Him or Me"	Tony Mordente	Judy Pioli & Paula A. Roth	January 30, 1981
12	"Shrinking"	Jon Sharp	Barbara Benedek	February 6, 1981
13	"He's Not Heavy, He's Neal's Brother"	Tony Mordente	Susan Harris	February 13, 1981
14	"Ira Returns"	Jon Sharp	Marc Sotkin	February 27, 1981
15	"There's No Business Like Joe Business"	Jon Sharp	Deborah Leschin	March 6, 1981
16	"Cops"	Jon Sharp	Barbara Benedek	March 20, 1981
17	"With Becky You Get Eggroll"	Jon Sharp	Judy Pioli & Paula A. Roth	March 27, 1981
18	"Hangers, No Starch"	Jon Sharp	Marc Sotkin	April 10, 1981
19	"S.M.I.L.E. Everybody"	Jon Sharp	Bob Colleary	May 8, 1981

== Bibliography ==
- Tim Brooks and Earle Marsh, The Complete Directory to Prime Time Network and Cable TV Shows 1946–Present, Ninth edition (New York: Ballantine Books, 2007) ISBN 978-0-345-49773-4
