= Norman Brooks (singer) =

Canadian singer

Norman Brooks (August 19, 1928 – September 14, 2006) was a Canadian singer, best known for his ability to sound like Al Jolson.

He was born Norman Joseph Arie, the son of Lebanese parents, in Montreal, Quebec, Canada in 1928. He played Jolson in the 1956 film, The Best Things in Life Are Free. Brooks performed in nightclubs and on television in the United States and Canada during the 1950s and 1960s. He played himself in the 1960 film Ocean's Eleven.

His records "Hello Sunshine" and "You Shouldn't Have Kissed Me The First Time" for the Zodiac Records label were national hits in 1953. His song "A Sky-Blue Shirt and a Rainbow Tie" reached No. 17 in the UK Singles Chart in November 1954.

== Partial discography ==
- 1953 – Zodiac 101 – "Hello Sunshine" / "You're My Baby"
- 1953 – Zodiac 102 – "You Shouldn't Have Kissed Me The First Time" / "Somebody Wonderful"
- 1953 – Zodiac 103 – "A Sky-Blue Shirt and a Rainbow Tie" / "This Waltz With You"
- 1953 – Zodiac 104 – "I'd Like To Be in Your Shoes Baby" / "I'm Kinda Crazy"
- 1953 – Zodiac 106 – "I Can't Give You Anything But Love" / "Johnny's Tune"
- 1954 – Zodiac 107 – "My 3-D Sweetie" / "Candy Moon"
- 1954 – Zodiac 109 – "Back in Circulation" / "Lou Lou Louisiana"
- 195? – Logan 111 – "Lover's Recipe" / "Easy"
