= How to Be Very, Very Popular =

1955 film by Nunnally Johnson

- Directed by: Nunnally Johnson
- Screenplay by: Nunnally Johnson
- Based on: Based upon a play by Howard Lindsay from a novel by Edward Hope, and a play by Lyford Moore and Harlan Thompson
- Produced by: Nunnally Johnson
- Starring: Betty Grable; Sheree North; Bob Cummings; Charles Coburn; Tommy Noonan
- Cinematography: Milton Krasner A. S. C.
- Edited by: Louis Loeffler
- Music by: Cyril J. Mockridge conducted by Lionel Newman
- Distributed by: 20th Century Fox
- Release date: July 22, 1955
- Running time: 89 minutes
- Country: United States
- Language: English
- Budget: $1,565,000
- Box office: $3.7 million

How to Be Very, Very Popular is a 1955 American comedy film written, produced and directed by Nunnally Johnson. The film starred Betty Grable in her final film role and Sheree North in her first leading role.

Johnson later said "I don't much like to think of How To Be Very, Very Popular because it brought fame and fortune to nobody. It was just a lousy mistake on everybody's part. "

== Plot ==
Stormy Tornado and Curly Flagg are two showgirls from a San Francisco cabaret who witness the murder of one of their fellow performers and can identify the killer. Not wanting to get mixed up in a murder rap, the girls flee the scene and hide out at Bristol College, disguising themselves as boys. However the need for attention makes the girls want to stand out in their stage costumes and then the trouble begins.

The ladies hide in the room of Fillmore Wedgewood, who proudly calls himself "the world's oldest student", and is always looking for ways to forestall graduation and facing "the real world" outside.

College President Dr. Tweed tries to coax a sizeable donation from wealthy alumnus B.J.Marshall. This proves difficult when Marshall is continually caught in the comical events that follow.

== Cast ==
- Betty Grable as Stormy Tornado
- Sheree North as Curly Flagg
- Bob Cummings as Fillmore "Wedge" Wedgewood
- Charles Coburn as Dr. Tweed
- Tommy Noonan as Eddie Jones
- Orson Bean as Toby Marshall
- Fred Clark as B.J. Marshall
- Charlotte Austin as Midge
- Alice Pearce as Miss "Syl" Sylvester
- Rhys Williams as Cedric Flagg
- Andrew Tombes as Sergeant Moon
- Noel Toy as Cherry Blossom Wang
- Emory Parnell as Police chief

== Background ==
How to Be Very, Very Popular was the third adaptation derived from the 1933 novel She Loves Me Not by Edward Hope (Edward Hope Coffey) novel. The novel was first made into the 1934 Paramount comedy She Loves Me Not which starred Miriam Hopkins as Curly Flagg and co-starred Bing Crosby. That was then remade as True to the Army for Paramount in 1942. How to Be Very, Very Popular was based on the Broadway adaptation of She Loves Me Not, by Howard Lindsay which was adapted from the original. It was also based on a second play, Sleep It Off, which was about a woman hypnotised for 24 hours.

It was written, produced and directed by Nunnally Johnson who had written and produced How to Marry a Millionaire. Johnson called Popular "an old fashioned farce. Wacky." He said he felt like making a comedy after doing two dramas, Night People and Black Widow.

The lead character in She Loves Me Not, Curly Flagg, was made a secondary character in How to Be Very, Very Popular, and Stormy Tornado became the lead to accommodate Betty Grable. She had been the number one box office attraction throughout the 1940s and early 50s, her films making enormous amounts of money for 20th Century Fox.

Nunnally Johnson said he wrote the script for Grable and Marilyn Monroe who had previously starred together in How to Marry a Millionaire (1953) which is credited with making Monroe the top star at Fox. Grable was the top star in the 1940s and Monroe would become the top star of the 50s. However, there was no rivalry between the two bombshells, in fact Grable is said to have famously told Monroe, "Go and get yours honey! I've had mine". The two became friends after that.

In December 1954 Fox announced the film would star Monroe. Sleep It Off was an alternative title. However Monroe refused to make the movie. In January 1955 the studio suspended her and replaced her with Sheree North who had been scheduled to appear in a film called Pink Tights.

Johnson said North had "been in the bull pen warming up too long and I'll hope she'll emerge from this a star. To date she's just been a threat but she's good looking and frank as they come."

Johnson later said in an interview he was "handed" North, and knew nothing about her. Johnson called the script "a mess, and Sheree, nice little woman, but unbelievably untalented. Untalented in the sense that she couldn't do this. [Johnson looks from left to right] You know;, she had to do this. [Johnson looks left, looks down, looks up to the left]. Her eyes would go down like this. I'd say, "Now; look, when you turn from him to her, can't you just look?" She says, "Isn't that what I'm doing?" I said, "No, this is what you're doing." With that kind of talent, it was hard to get anything out of her."

In the absence of Monroe, Fox offered the co starring role to Betty Grable. Robert Cummings then joined the cast.

Archer MacDonald was meant to play a key role but was hospitalised for ulcers and replaced by Tommy Noonan.

Johnson reflected "Betty was good as always, but its only distinction, if you want to call it that, is that I'm convinced that Billy Wilder pinched the plot." Wilder would make Some Like It Hot with Monroe, which had a similar plot.

== Song credit ==
- Song "How to Be Very, Very Popular" by Jule Styne and Sammy Cahn
- Vocal Supervision Ken Darby
- Orchestration Edward B. Powell • Skip Martin

== Reception ==
At the time of its release, How to Be Very, Very Popular was greeted with mixed-to-positive press. Betty Grable's performance was generally praised, whereas newcomer Sheree North's performance drew less impressive notices. North appeared on the cover of LIFE just before the film's release. It enjoyed reasonable success, earning an estimated $1.65 million in rentals at the North American box office during its first year of release.

== See also ==
- List of American films of 1955

== Notes ==
- Johnson, Nunnally (1969). Recollections of Nunnally Johnson oral history transcript. University of California.
