= Tom Ewell =

American actor (1909–1994)

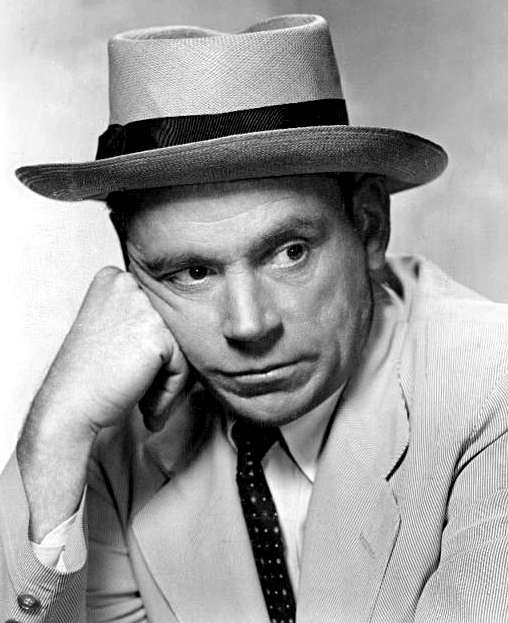
- Ewell in 1958
- Born: Samuel Yewell Tompkins; April 29, 1909; Owensboro, Kentucky, U.S.
- Died: September 12, 1994 (aged 85); Los Angeles, California, U.S.
- Occupation: Actor
- Years active: 1928–1986
- Spouses: Judith Abbott (m. 1946; div. 1947) Marjorie Sanborn (m. 1948)
- Children: 1
- Military service
- Allegiance: United States
- Branch: United States Navy
- Service years: 1942–1945
- Rank: Lieutenant

Tom Ewell (born Samuel Yewell Tompkins; April 29, 1909 – September 12, 1994) was an American film, stage and television actor, and producer. His most successful and most identifiable role was that of Richard Sherman in The Seven Year Itch, a character he played in the Broadway production (1952–1954) and reprised for the 1955 film adaptation. He received a Tony Award for his work in the play and a Golden Globe Award for his performance in the film. Although Ewell preferred acting on stage, he accepted several other screen roles in light comedies of the 1950s, most notably The Girl Can't Help It (1956). He appeared in the film version of the musical State Fair (1962) and in a small number of additional ones released between the early 1960s and 1980s.

== Early life ==
Ewell was born in Owensboro, Kentucky, the son of Martine (née Yewell) and Samuel William Tompkins. His family expected him to follow in their footsteps as lawyers or whiskey and tobacco dealers, but Ewell decided to pursue acting instead. He began acting in summer stock in 1928 with Don Ameche before moving to New York City in 1931. He enrolled in the Actors Studio.

== Career ==
He made his Broadway debut in 1934 and his film debut in 1940, and for several years, he played comic supporting roles. His acting career was interrupted during World War II when he served in the United States Navy.

After World War II, Ewell attracted attention with a strong performance in the film Adam's Rib (1949), and he began to receive Hollywood roles more frequently. Ewell continued acting in summer stock through the 1940s: He starred opposite June Lockhart in Lawrence Riley's biographical play Kin Hubbard in 1951, the story of one of America's greatest humorists and cartoonists, Kin Hubbard. With this play, he made his debut as a producer. In 1947, he won a Clarence Derwent Award for his portrayal of Fred Taylor in the original Broadway cast of John Loves Mary.

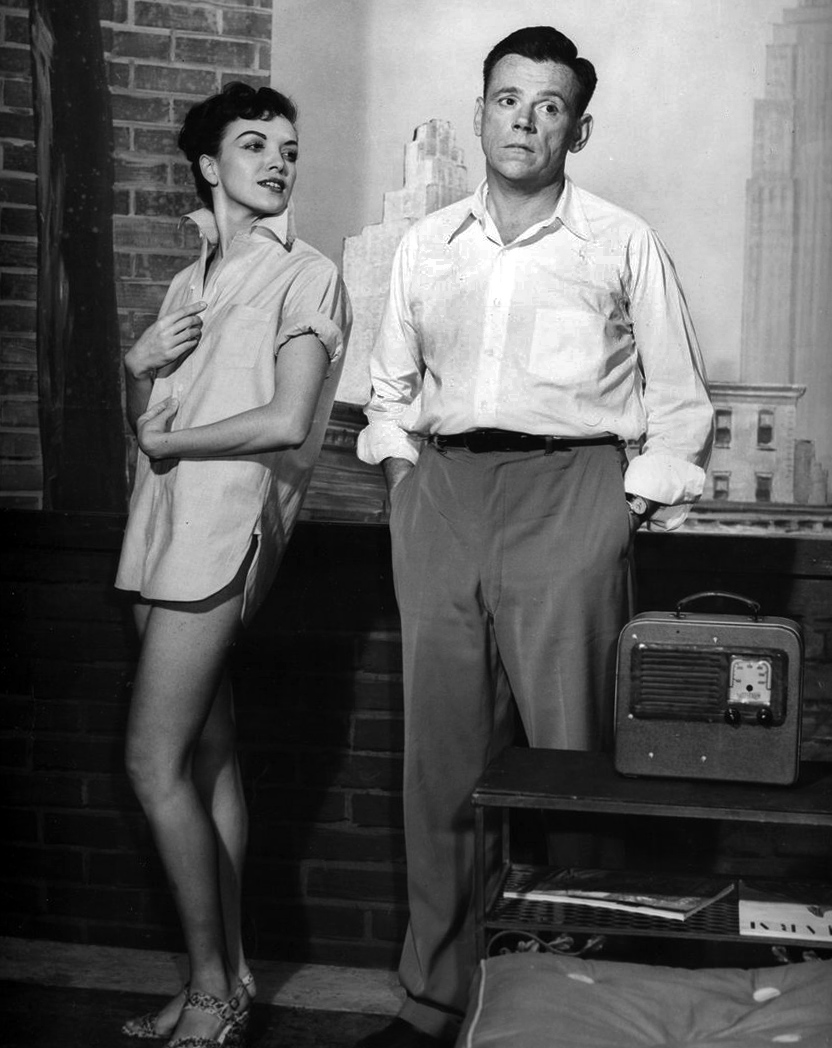
With Paulette Girard in the Broadway play, The Seven Year Itch (1952)

His most successful and, arguably, most identifiable role came in 1952, when he joined the Broadway production of The Seven Year Itch as protagonist Richard Sherman. With Vanessa Brown as "The Girl", Ewell played the part more than 950 times over three years, as he indicated in a mystery guest appearance on the June 12, 1955, airing of What's My Line? to promote the 1955 film adaptation. He earned both the Tony Award for Best Actor in a Play and the Golden Globe Award for Best Actor – Motion Picture Musical or Comedy for portraying Sherman.

He enjoyed other film successes, including The Lieutenant Wore Skirts with Sheree North and The Girl Can't Help It (both 1956) opposite Jayne Mansfield. In The Girl Can't Help It, Julie London appears as a mirage to Tom Miller (Ewell) singing her signature song, "Cry Me a River". He played Abel Frake in the 1962 version of the Rodgers and Hammerstein musical State Fair. In 1956, at the Coconut Grove Playhouse, he co-starred with Bert Lahr in the U.S. premiere of Waiting for Godot.

However, as his film and theater careers seemed to have reached their peaks, he turned his attention to television. Over several years, he played guest roles in numerous series, and received an Emmy Award nomination for his continuing role in Baretta. His final acting performance was in a 1986 episode of Murder, She Wrote.

From September 1960 to May 1961, Ewell starred in his own television series, in the self-titled The Tom Ewell Show, which lasted for one season.

In 1970, Ewell played Hoy Valentine in The Men From Shiloh (the rebranded name of The Virginian) in the episode titled "With Love, Bullets and Valentines". In the mid-1970s, Ewell enjoyed popular success with a recurring role as retired veteran policeman Billy Truman in the 1970s Emmy-winning TV series Baretta. Ewell appeared in 36 episodes of the television-cop series, which starred Robert Blake as Detective Tony Baretta, until its end in 1978. In 1979, he was a guest star on the television series Taxi. Ewell also co-starred from 1981 to 1982 as the drunken town doctor in the short-lived television series Best of the West.

== Personal life and death ==
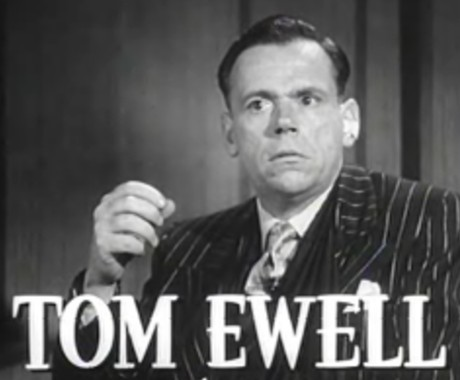
Trailer for Adam's Rib (1949)

On March 18, 1946, he married Judy Abbott, daughter of Broadway director George Abbott; the short-lived marriage ended in divorce a year later. Ewell then married Marjorie Sanborn on May 5, 1948; they had a son, Taylor.

Ewell died of undisclosed causes at the Motion Picture Country House and Hospital on September 12, 1994. His widow, Marjorie, said he had suffered a long series of illnesses. Ewell was also survived by his son, Taylor (known as Tate Ewell, born November 2, 1954), and by his mother, Martine Yewell Tompkins (1889–1998), who lived in Curdsville, Kentucky, where she died at age 109.

== Legacy ==
In 2003, Ewell was inducted into the Owensboro High School Hall of Fame.

== Filmography ==
=== Film ===
Year	Title	Role	Notes
1940	They Knew What They Wanted	New Hired Hand	Uncredited
1941	Back in the Saddle	Fight Spectator	Uncredited
1941	Desert Bandit	Ordway - Texas Ranger	
1947	Babies, They're Wonderful	Harold	Short Film
1948	Mr. Groundling Takes the Air	Mr. Groundling	Short Film
1949	Adam's Rib	Warren Attinger	
1949	Southward Ho Ho!	Tom	Short Film
1949	The Football Fan	Tom - The Football Fan	Short Film
1949	Caribbean Capers	Tom the Tourist	Short Film
1950	A Life of Her Own	Tom Caraway	
1950	American Guerrilla in the Philippines	Jim Mitchell	
1950	Mr. Music	Haggerty	
1950	How Green Is My Spinach	Man in Audience	Uncredited (Short Film)
1950	The Rhumba Seat	Tom	Short Film
1951	Up Front	Willie	
1952	Finders Keepers	Tiger Kipps	
1952	Lost in Alaska	Nugget Joe McDermott	
1952	Back at the Front	Willie	
1955	The Seven Year Itch	Richard Sherman	
1956	The Lieutenant Wore Skirts	Gregory Whitcomb	
1956	The Great American Pastime	Bruce Hallerton	
1956	The Girl Can't Help It	Tom Miller	
1958	A Nice Little Bank That Should Be Robbed	Max Rutgers	
1962	Tender Is the Night	Abe North	
1962	State Fair	Abel Frake	
1968	Columbia Musical Travelark: Wonders of Kentucky	Colonel Tom	Short Film
1970	Suppose They Gave a War and Nobody Came	Billy Joe Davis	
1972	To Find a Man	Dr. Hargrove	
1972	They Only Kill Their Masters	Walter	
1974	The Great Gatsby	Mourner	Uncredited
1979	Butterflies in Heat	Hadley Crabtree	
1983	Easy Money	Scrappleton	

=== Television ===
Year	Title	Role	Notes
1948	Kraft Theatre	Stephen Brewster	"Suppressed Desires"
1948–49	Actors Studio	Himself	4 episodes
1949	NBC Presents	himself	2 episodes
1951	The Billy Rose Show	Himself	"Whirling of Life"
1951	Danger	unknown role	"The Night of March Fifteenth"
1951	Search for Tomorrow	Sheriff Bill Lang	unknown episode(s)
1951	Studio One in Hollywood	Willie Mason	"Mighty Like a Rogue"
1951	Lights Out	Charlie Drome	"The Deal"
1951	Cosmopolitan Theatre	unknown role	"Mr. Pratt and the Triple Horror Bill"
1952	Robert Montgomery Presents	unknown role	"See No Evil"
1955	Playwrights '56	William Bingham	"Daisy, Daisy"
1955	Alfred Hitchcock Presents	Albert Pelham	Season 1 Episode 10: "The Case of Mr. Pelham"
1956	The Alcoa Hour	Earl Carleton	"Man on Fire"
1959	The United States Steel Hour	Barney Henderson	"The Square Egghead"
1959	General Electric Theatre	John Emmet Owens	"The Day of the Hanging"
1960–61	The Tom Ewell Show	Tom Potter	series regular (32 episodes)
1962	The Sound and the Fidelity	unknown role	TV movie
1963	The Dick Powell Theatre	Congressman Albert Higgins	"The Honorable Albert Higgins"
1964	Wagon Train	Hector Heatherton	"The Hector Heatherton Story"
1965	Burke's Law	Leander Clement	"Who Killed Nobody Somehow?"
1966	Summer Fun	unknown role	"Kwimper of New Jersey"
1970	The Governor & J.J.	Uncle Charley	"Charley's Back in Town"
1970	The Virginian	Hoy Valentine	"With Love, Bullets and Valentines"
1971	The Name of the Game	District Attorney Simpson	"A Sister from Napoli"
1971	Alias Smith and Jones	Deputy Treadwell	"The Root of It All"
1973	The New Temperatures Rising Show	Harry Butler	"Diagnosis: Who Knows?"
1974	The Wide World of Mystery	Lebow	"The Spy Who Returned from the Dead"
1975	Promise Him Anything	Judge	TV movie
1975–78	Baretta	Billy Truman	series regular (44 episodes)
1978	Fantasy Island	Burt "Fingers" Lonegan	"The Over the Hill Caper / Proof! You're a Movie Star"
1979	The Return of Mod Squad	Cook	TV movie
1979	Eischied	Super	2 episodes
1979	Taxi	Dr. Richmond	"Nardo Loses Her Marbles"
1979	Flying High	Williams	"Eye Opener"
1981–82	Best of the West	Doc Kullens	series regular (22 episodes)
1982	Terror at Alcatraz	Johnson	TV movie
1982	Trapper John, M.D.	Earl Tendermeyer	"The Good Life"
1986	Murder, She Wrote	Josh Corbin	"Trial by Error"

=== Theatre ===
Year	Title	Role	Notes
1934	They Shall Not Die	Red, Young Man	
1934	Geraniums is My Window	Denver	
1934–35	The First Legion	Novices and Choir	
1935–36	Let Freedom Ring	Small Hardy	Young Frank Martin at 21
1936	Ethan Frome	Dennis Eady	
1936–37	Stage Door	Larry Westscott	
1938–39	The Merchant of Yonkers	Cornelius Hackl	
1939	Family Portrait	Simon	
1939–1940	Key Largo	Gage (replacement)	replaced Crahan Denton
1941	Liberty Jones	Dick Brown	
1941–42	Sunny River	Daniel Marshall	
1946	Apple of His Eye	Glen Stover	
1947–48	John Loves Mary	Fred Taylor	
1948–49	Small Wonder	unknown	
1952–55	The Seven Year Itch	Richard Sherman	
1957–58	The Tunnel of Love	Augie Poole	
1958	Patate	Leon Rollo	
1960	A Thurber Carnival	Grant / He / Anderson / The Pet Counselor / James Thurber / Narrator / Walter Mitty	
1965	Xmas in Las Vegas	Edward T. Wellspot	

=== Accolades ===
Year	Association	Category	Nominated work	Results	Ref
1947	Clarence Derwent Awards	Best Supporting Male (USA)	—N/a	Won	
1953	Tony Award	Best Actor in a Play	The Seven Year Itch	Won	
1956	Golden Globe Awards	Best Performance by an Actor in a Motion Picture — Musical or Comedy	The Seven Year Itch	Won	
1977	Primetime Emmy Award	Outstanding Continuing Performance by a Supporting Actor in a Drama Series	Baretta	Nominated	
