= The Seven Year Itch (play) =

1952 play by George Axelrod

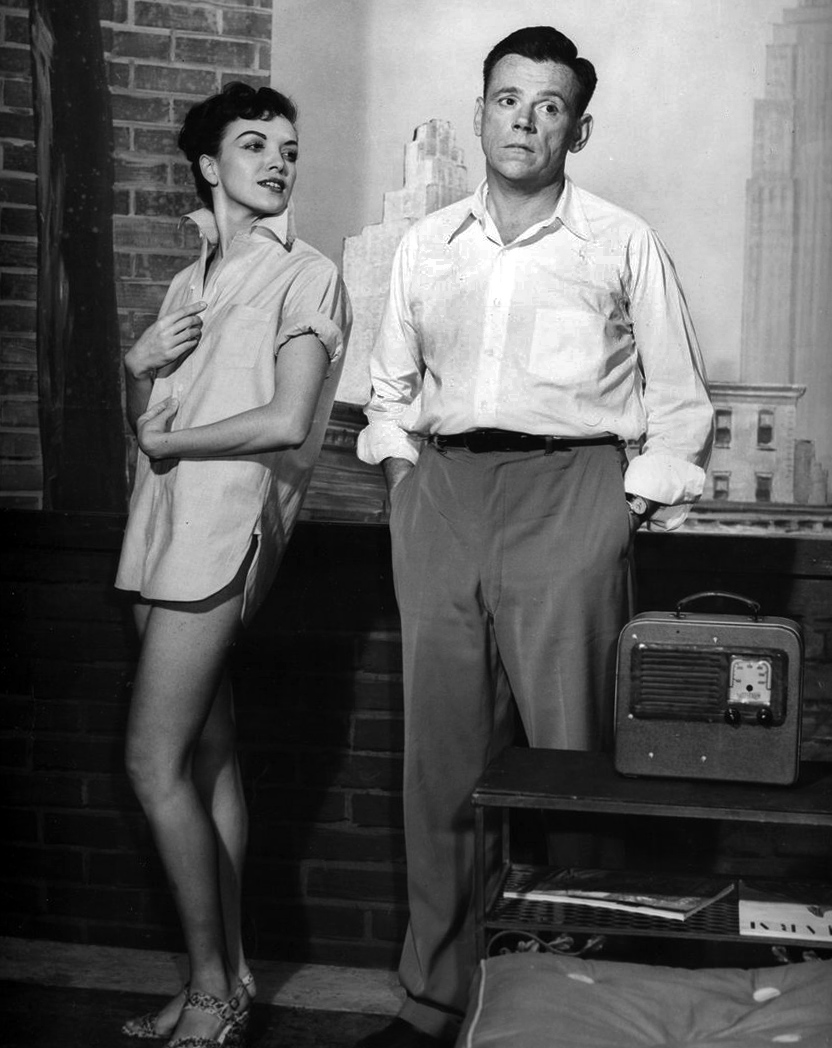
- Paulette Girard and Tom Ewell in The Seven Year Itch (1952)
- Original language: English
- Written by: George Axelrod
- Subject: Fidelity
- Genre: Comedy
- Setting: The apartment of the Richard Shermans, in the Gramercy Park section of New York City. Present time.

Premiere
- Date: November 20, 1952
- Place: Fulton Theatre; New York City

The Seven Year Itch is a 1952 three-act play written by George Axelrod. The original Broadway production starred Tom Ewell and Vanessa Brown.

The titular phrase, which refers to declining interest in a monogamous relationship after seven years of marriage, has been used by psychologists.

The play was filmed in 1955 as The Seven Year Itch, directed and co-written by Billy Wilder and starring Marilyn Monroe and Ewell, reprising his Broadway role.

== Productions ==
The stage version premiered at the Fulton Theatre on November 20, 1952, and closed there on August 13, 1955, after a run of 1,141 performances, making it the longest-running non-musical play of the 1950s.

=== Opening night cast ===
- Tom Ewell as Richard Sherman
- Vanessa Brown as The Girl
- Neva Patterson as Helen Sherman
- Marilyn Clark as Miss Morris
- Joan Donovan as Elaine
- Robert Emhardt as Dr. Brubaker
- Pat Fowler as The Voice of The Girl's Conscience
- George Ives as The Voice of Richard's Conscience
- George Keane as Tom Mackenzie
- Johnny Klein as Ricky Sherman
- Irene Moore as Marie What-Ever-Her-Name-Was

Replacement cast members during the original Broadway run included Eddie Albert, Eddie Bracken, and Elliott Nugent as Richard Sherman; Sally Forrest and Louise King as The Girl; and Paulette Girard as Marie What-Ever-Her-Name-Was.

The touring production starred Eddie Bracken as Richard Sherman and also featured Gena Rowlands as Elaine. In London, the West End production starred Rosemary Harris.

Although The Seven Year Itch has never returned to Broadway, it was revived in a 2000 London production starring Daryl Hannah, and the play continues to be produced in community theatres and small professional theatres such as the Ivoryton Playhouse, the American Century Theatre, and the Miami Theatre Center.

== Plot ==
An American husband, married for seven years, fantasises about his adventurous past, and future, particularly with "the girl" who moves into his building.

== Background ==
The play was written by George Axelrod who was inspired his own life. He said the play "was written seriously. It was a comedy, but I was madly in love with a young actress while I was married, and I used to go through agonies about it. I took a lot of her dialogue, her chatter, almost word for word, and put it into the play. Later, this lady played Itch on a national tour, and she told me, "God, that dialogue is so real." She had no idea it was stuff she had said."

Axelrod offered the play to producer Courtney Burr, who was a friend of his father. Burr agreed to do the play. Axelrod wanted Elliott Nugent to play the lead but the actor turned it down; however his son-in-law Johnny Gerstad directed. Axelrod finished the play in July and rehearsals started in September. Axelrod said "Nugent turned out to be a monster. Gerstad was great because he was willing to listen to me."

Axelrod said his choice for the lead, after Nugent, was Keenan Wynn but the producer wanted Tom Ewell and "he was wonderful in it. You cannot fault something that worked."

== Notes ==
- McGilligan, Patrick (1997). "George Axelrod: Irony! Interview by Pat McGilligan". Backstory 3: Interviews with Screenwriters of the 60s. Berkeley: University of California Press. p. 43-84.
