= The Best Things in Life Are Free (film) =

1956 film by Michael Curtiz

- film poster
- Directed by: Michael Curtiz
- Screenplay by: William Bowers; Phoebe Ephron; Frank Tashlin (uncredited)
- Story by: John O'Hara
- Produced by: Henry Ephron
- Starring: Gordon MacRae; Dan Dailey; Ernest Borgnine; Sheree North; Tommy Noonan; Murvyn Vye; Phyllis Avery; Larry Keating; Tony Galento; Norman Brooks
- Cinematography: Leon Shamroy
- Edited by: Dorothy Spencer
- Music by: Lionel Newman
- Production company: 20th Century Fox
- Distributed by: 20th Century Fox
- Release date: September 28, 1956
- Running time: 104 minutes
- Country: United States
- Language: English
- Budget: $1.16 million
- Box office: $2.7 million

The Best Things in Life Are Free is a 1956 American musical film directed by Michael Curtiz. The film stars Gordon MacRae, Dan Dailey, and Ernest Borgnine as the real-life songwriting team of Buddy DeSylva, Lew Brown, and Ray Henderson of the late 1920s and early 1930s, and Sheree North as Kitty Kane, a singer (possibly based on Helen Kane).

In 1957, the year after the film was released, it received an Oscar nomination for Lionel Newman in the category of Best Music, Scoring of a Musical Picture.

== Cast ==
- Gordon MacRae as Buddy DeSylva
- Dan Dailey as Ray Henderson
- Ernest Borgnine as Lew Brown
- Sheree North as Kitty Kane
- Tommy Noonan as Carl Frisbee
- Murvyn Vye as Manny Costain
- Phyllis Avery as Maggie Henderson
- Larry Keating as Winfield Sheehan
- Tony Galento as Fingers
- Norman Brooks as Al Jolson
- Jacques d'Amboise as Specialty dancer
- Roxanne Arlen as Perky Nichols
- Byron Palmer as Hollywood star
- Gordon Richards as Butler

== Reception ==
=== Critical response ===
Premiering in September 1956, The Best Things in Life Are Free was met with mixed reviews. Some reviews called it "the biggest new musical this year" and others "a musical-comedy that could've been produced on a higher budget with bigger and better production numbers".

=== Box-office performance ===
Being a musical, though a modestly produced one, the movie was fairly expensive to produce. The film ended with a budget of $2.86 million and made just over $4 million at the box office, earning $2,250,000 in North American rentals in 1956.

== Songs ==
- "Lucky Day"

Music by Ray Henderson
Lyrics by Lew Brown and Buddy G. DeSylva
Sung by Dan Dailey

- "If I Had a Talking Picture of You"

Music by Ray Henderson
Lyrics by Lew Brown and Buddy G. DeSylva
Sung by Byron Palmer

- "Here Am I, Broken Hearted"

Music by Ray Henderson
Lyrics by Lew Brown and Buddy G. DeSylva
Sung by Gordon MacRae

- "Button up Your Overcoat"

Music by Ray Henderson
Lyrics by Lew Brown and Buddy G. DeSylva
Sung by Dan Dailey and Gordon MacRae

- "Good News"

Music by Ray Henderson
Lyrics by Lew Brown and Buddy G. DeSylva
Sung by Gordon MacRae

- "You're the Cream in My Coffee"

Music by Ray Henderson
Lyrics by Lew Brown and Buddy G. DeSylva
Sung by Dan Dailey

- "The Best Things in Life Are Free"

Music by Ray Henderson
Lyrics by Lew Brown and Buddy G. DeSylva
Sung by Sheree North (dubbed by Eileen Wilson)

- "Lucky in Love"

Music by Ray Henderson
Lyrics by Lew Brown and Buddy G. DeSylva
Sung by Gordon MacRae

- "Black Bottom"

Music by Ray Henderson
Lyrics by Lew Brown and Buddy G. DeSylva
Choreographed by Rod Alexander and danced by Sheree North and Jacques d'Amboise

- "Birth of the Blues"

Music by Ray Henderson
Lyrics by Lew Brown and Buddy G. DeSylva
Danced by Sheree North and Jacques d'Amboise

- "Sonny Boy"

Music by Ray Henderson
Lyrics by Lew Brown and Buddy G. DeSylva
Sung by Norman Brooks

- "Follow Thru"

Music by Ray Henderson
Lyrics by Lew Brown and Buddy G. DeSylva

- "One More Time"

Music by Ray Henderson
Lyrics by Lew Brown and Buddy G. DeSylva

- "Thank Your Father"

Music by Ray Henderson
Lyrics by Lew Brown and Buddy G. DeSylva

- "This Is the Missus"

Music by Ray Henderson
Lyrics by Lew Brown

- "Together"

Music by Ray Henderson
Lyrics by Lew Brown and Buddy G. DeSylva

- ”It All Depends on You"

Music by Ray Henderson
Lyrics by Lew Brown and Buddy G. DeSylva

- "You Try Somebody Else (We'll Be Back Together Again)"

Music by Ray Henderson
Lyrics by Lew Brown and Buddy G. DeSylva

- "Without Love"

Music by Ray Henderson
Lyrics by Lew Brown and Buddy G. DeSylva
