= Lionel Newman =

American composer, pianist and conductor (1916–1989)

- Born: January 4, 1916; New Haven, Connecticut, U.S.
- Died: February 3, 1989 (aged 73) Los Angeles, California, U.S.
- Occupations: Composer, pianist, conductor
- Instrument: Piano
- Years active: 1932–1985

Lionel Newman (January 4, 1916 – February 3, 1989) was an American conductor, pianist, and film and television composer. He won the Academy Award for Best Score of a Musical Picture for Hello Dolly! with Lennie Hayton in 1969. He was the brother of Alfred Newman and Emil Newman, uncle of composers Randy Newman, David Newman, Thomas Newman and Maria Newman, and grandfather of Joey Newman. His 11 nominations contribute to the Newmans being the most nominated Academy Award extended family, with a collective 92 nominations in various music categories.

== Biography ==
=== Early life ===
Born in New Haven, Connecticut, United States, Newman was one of ten children, the youngest of seven boys, born to Russian-Jewish immigrant parents. While the family had little money, the children's mother, Luba, was a strong woman who encouraged them to achieve. Newman migrated to Hollywood where, at the age of 16, he began conducting for impresario Earl Carroll. This was where he met his future wife, Beverly Carroll, an Earl Carroll Vanities showgirl, and niece of the impresario. Newman had formal training in New York, and after moving to Los Angeles, he continued his studies with Joseph Achron and Mario Castelnuovo-Tedesco.

In the 1930s, Newman earned his stripes conducting national tours and working as the piano accompanist for Mae West. She used to scold him for holding his hands too high in the pit saying, "I'm the show, Newman, not you."

At the age of 18, he obtained a job playing piano on the Holland America ocean liner, the S.S.Rotterdam, with his "Newman's Society Orchestra". This trip had great significance for him; he had always wanted to make another such trip to find his mother's home.

=== Career at 20th Century Fox ===
After serving an apprenticeship conducting and orchestrating live shows, Newman joined 20th Century Fox as a rehearsal pianist under the guidance of his brother, Alfred Newman, and by 1959, he had been promoted to musical director for Television there. This opened the doors to feature films. He was soon made vice president in charge of music for both television and features. This resulted in a promotion in 1982 to senior vice president of all music for Twentieth Century Fox Films. He wrote several classic TV themes for Fox, including The Many Loves of Dobie Gillis, Adventures in Paradise, and Daniel Boone. He also composed the 1979 and 1982 fanfares for Fox.

Lionel Newman's tenure with Twentieth Century Fox spanned 46 years with over 200 films to his credit, including How to Marry a Millionaire, North to Alaska, The Proud Ones, Road House, and Love Me Tender (Elvis Presley's first picture). He was musical director for all of Marilyn Monroe's films at Fox, in accordance with her request, including Gentlemen Prefer Blondes, There's No Business Like Show Business, River of No Return, and Let's Make Love, with the exception of Bus Stop which was directed and conducted by his brother, Alfred Newman and There's No Business Like Show Business which was co-directed and co-conducted by Alfred Newman.

In November 2013, the Twentieth Century Fox Music Department was dedicated as “The Lionel Newman Music Building,” and a bronze plaque of Lionel, listing his composition and conducting credits was unveiled. Speaking to guests about Lionel's impact on film and television music, who he was as a friend, mentor and boss, and who he was as a family man were Steven Spielberg, John Williams, Lionel's nephew, composer Randy Newman, and his grandson, Joey Newman. The dedication was attended by several hundred people, including his family beyond Randy and Joey.

=== Awards and nominations ===
He received eleven Academy Award nominations, and won an Oscar for Hello Dolly! with Lennie Hayton in 1969. He conducted the scores for Cleopatra, The Sand Pebbles, The Agony and the Ecstasy, The Long Hot Summer, The Young Lions, Alien, and The Omen. He was the musical supervisor for Star Wars, The Empire Strikes Back, Return of the Jedi, Monsignor, and The Fury. Although he did not consider himself a songwriter, he received a certificate of merit from Broadcast Music Incorporated (BMI) for over one million network performances of his 1948 hit, "Again", a pop standard that lived on long after its introduction in the film Road House.

=== Work with other composers ===
Newman's wit and humor were famous around the film capital. Frank Sinatra, in his biography, called Newman one of the funniest men in Hollywood. Jerry Goldsmith recalls in his biography how Newman used to call him "Gorgeous". Goldsmith also recounts that Newman nicknamed John Williams "Little Dimitri", after Dimitri Tiomkin.

Newman was a perfectionist, always making "just one more take" if some little detail could be improved. He wanted the Twentieth Century Fox Orchestra to reach the level of a great symphony orchestra, and it did, especially when he conducted. He was instrumental in the careers of John Williams, Jerry Goldsmith, Dominic Frontiere, Pat Williams, and many more.

=== Personal life ===
Newman was married to Beverly Carroll, who died October 21, 2010, and with whom he had three daughters.

=== Later life ===
During the last few years of his tenure at Fox, Newman conducted major symphony orchestras in the United States, Canada, the UK, and New Zealand. Newman retired in 1985 and died on February 3, 1989, from cardiac arrest.

== Filmography ==
Year	Title	Director(s)	Studio(s)	Notes
1943	He Hired the Boss	Thomas Z. Loring	20th Century Fox	uncredited
1950	The Jackpot	Walter Lang	20th Century Fox	—N/a
1953	The Silver Whip	Harmon Jones	20th Century Fox	uncredited
1953	Powder River	Louis King	20th Century Fox	—N/a
1953	Gentlemen Prefer Blondes	Howard Hawks	20th Century Fox	uncredited
1954	Siege at Red River	Rudolph Maté	20th Century Fox	—N/a
1954	Princess of the Nile	Harmon Jones	20th Century Fox	uncredited
1954	The Gambler from Natchez	Henry Levin	20th Century Fox	—N/a
1954	Gorilla at Large	Harmon Jones	20th Century Fox	—N/a
1954	There's No Business Like Show Business	Walter Lang	20th Century Fox	uncredited
1956	The Killer Is Loose	Budd Boetticher	United Artists	—N/a
1956	The Proud Ones	Robert D. Webb	20th Century Fox	—N/a
1956	A Kiss Before Dying	Gerd Oswald	United Artists	—N/a
1956	The Last Wagon	Delmer Daves	20th Century Fox	—N/a
1956	Love Me Tender	Robert D. Webb	20th Century Fox	—N/a
1956	The Girl Can't Help It	Frank Tashlin	20th Century Fox	uncredited
1957	The Way to the Gold	Robert D. Webb	20th Century Fox	—N/a
1957	Bernardine	Henry Levin	20th Century Fox	—N/a
1957	Kiss Them for Me	Stanley Donen	20th Century Fox	—N/a
1958	Sing, Boy, Sing	Henry Ephron	20th Century Fox	—N/a
1958	The Bravados	Henry King	20th Century Fox	—N/a
1958	Mardi Gras	Edmund Goulding	20th Century Fox	uncredited
1959	Compulsion	Richard Fleischer	20th Century Fox	—N/a
1959	Say One for Me	Frank Tashlin	20th Century Fox	uncredited
1960	Let's Make Love	George Cukor	20th Century Fox	—N/a
1960	North to Alaska	Henry Hathaway	20th Century Fox	—N/a
1963	Move Over, Darling	Michael Gordon	20th Century Fox	—N/a
1964	The Pleasure Seekers	Jean Negulesco	20th Century Fox	—N/a
1965	Do Not Disturb	Ralph Levy; George Marshall	20th Century Fox	—N/a
1967	The St. Valentine's Day Massacre	Roger Corman	20th Century Fox	uncredited
1968	The Boston Strangler	Richard Fleischer	20th Century Fox	—N/a
1969	The Desperate Mission	Earl Bellamy	20th Century Fox	—N/a
1969	Hello Dolly	Gene Kelly	20th Century Fox	—N/a

== Awards and nominations ==
Year	Award	Result	Category	Film	Other notes
1939	Academy Award	Nominated	Best Music, Original Song	The Cowboy and the Lady	Shared with Arthur Quenzer; for the song "The Cowboy and the Lady"
1951	Academy Award	Nominated	Best Music, Scoring of a Musical Picture	I'll Get By	-
1952	Academy Award	Nominated	Best Music, Original Song	Golden Girl	Shared with Eliot Daniel; for the song "Never"
1955	Academy Award	Nominated	Best Music, Scoring of a Musical Picture	There's No Business Like Show Business	Shared with Alfred Newman
1957	Academy Award	Nominated	Best Music, Scoring of a Musical Picture	The Best Things in Life Are Free	-
1959	Academy Award	Nominated	Best Music, Scoring of a Musical Picture	Mardi Gras	-
1960	Academy Award	Nominated	Best Music, Scoring of a Musical Picture	Say One for Me	-
1961	Academy Award	Nominated	Best Music, Scoring of a Musical Picture	Let's Make Love	Shared with Earle Hagen
1966	Academy Award	Nominated	Best Music, Scoring of Music, Adaptation or Treatment	The Pleasure Seekers	Shared with Alexander Courage
1968	Academy Award	Nominated	Best Music, Scoring of Music, Adaptation or Treatment	Doctor Dolittle	Shared with Alexander Courage
1969	Academy Award	Won	Best Music, Score of a Musical Picture (Original or Adaptation)	Hello, Dolly!	Shared with Lennie Hayton
1958	Laurel Awards	Nominated	Top Music Director	April Love	Place 4th
