= The Way to the Gold =

1957 film by Robert D. Webb

- Directed by: Robert D. Webb
- Written by: Wendell Mayes
- Produced by: David Weisbart
- Starring: Jeffrey Hunter; Sheree North
- Cinematography: Leo Tover
- Edited by: Hugh S. Fowler
- Music by: Lionel Newman
- Distributed by: 20th Century-Fox
- Release date: May 10, 1957
- Running time: 94 minutes
- Country: United States
- Language: English
- Budget: $920,000
- Box office: $2.9 million

The Way to the Gold is a 1957 American adventure film directed by Robert D. Webb and starring Jeffrey Hunter, Sheree North, and Barry Sullivan. It was released by 20th Century-Fox.

== Plot ==
After serving his time in prison, Joe Mundy (Hunter) regains his freedom. He forms an unexpected bond with a fellow inmate, who confides in him about the whereabouts of stolen gold. Upon his release, Joe is shadowed by the menacing Little Brother Williams (portrayed by Neville Brand) as he arrives in Glendale, Arizona. In this unfamiliar town, he encounters Henrietta Clifford (North), an empathetic woman who comes to his aid after he suffers a brutal assault by Williams.

As Joe and Henrietta's connection deepens, they embark on a quest to uncover the hidden gold for themselves. Their journey takes them through a series of challenges, unexpected alliances, and moments of danger. Through their determination and teamwork, they navigate the complexities of their shared goal while grappling with their own personal histories.

Together, Joe and Henrietta's pursuit of the stolen treasure becomes a metaphor for their individual quests for redemption and purpose. As they navigate the twists and turns of their adventure, they discover not only the potential riches at the end of their journey but also the value of trust, companionship, and the inner strength to overcome their pasts.

== Cast ==
- Jeffrey Hunter as Joe Mundy
- Sheree North as Henrietta 'Hank' Clifford, waitress
- Barry Sullivan as Marshal Hannibal
- Walter Brennan as Uncle George Williams
- Neville Brand as Little Brother Williams

== Production ==
The film was based on a novel by Wilbur Daniel Steele. In August 1954 Darryl F. Zanuck recommended 20th Century Fox buy the screen right prior to publication. (Zanuck had left the studio but still held considerable clout there.) They paid $60,000 even though the novel had not been completed.

The novel was published in July 1955. The New York Times said it "should have real success."

In May 1956 Wendell Mayes was hired to write the script. Mayes later called it "a picture that was before its time, which slipped by quite unnoticed... an interesting picture, but the studio and the people who publicize pictures didn't understand that it was a comedy. They thought that it was a big melodrama, so it slipped by."

Elvis Presley was offered the starring role in the film but 20th Century-Fox refused to pay the $250,000 plus 50% of the profits that Elvis' manager, Colonel Tom Parker was demanding (Fox had offered $150,000 plus 50%).

Filming started January 1957. Jeffrey Hunter was under contract to Fox.

Sheree North separated from her husband during filming.

== See also ==
- List of American films of 1957
