= The Seven Year Itch =

1955 romantic comedy film directed by Billy Wilder

- Theatrical release poster
- Directed by: Billy Wilder
- Screenplay by: George Axelrod; Billy Wilder
- Based on: The Seven Year Itch by George Axelrod
- Produced by: Charles K. Feldman; Billy Wilder
- Starring: Marilyn Monroe; Tom Ewell
- Cinematography: Milton R. Krasner
- Edited by: Hugh S. Fowler
- Music by: Alfred Newman
- Production company: Charles K. Feldman Group Productions
- Distributed by: 20th Century-Fox
- Release dates: June 3, 1955 (New York City); June 17, 1955 (Los Angeles)
- Running time: 105 minutes
- Country: United States
- Language: English
- Budget: $1.8 million
- Box office: $12 million

The Seven Year Itch is a 1955 American romantic comedy film directed by Billy Wilder, who co-wrote the screenplay with George Axelrod. Based on Axelrod's 1952 play, the film stars Marilyn Monroe and Tom Ewell, with the latter reprising his stage role. It contains one of the most iconic pop culture images of the 20th century, in the form of Monroe standing on a subway grate as her white dress is blown upwards by a passing train. The titular phrase, which refers to waning interest in a monogamous relationship after seven years of marriage, has been used by psychologists.

== Plot ==
Richard Sherman is a middle-aged publishing executive in New York City, whose wife Helen and son Ricky are spending the summer in Ogunquit, Maine, to escape the city's crippling heat. When he returns home from the train station with the kayak paddle Ricky accidentally left behind, he meets an unnamed woman, who is a commercial actress and former model. She has subleased the apartment upstairs while its owners are away for the summer. That evening, he resumes reading the manuscript of a book in which psychiatrist Dr. Brubaker claims that almost all men are driven to have extra-marital affairs in the seventh year of marriage. Sherman has an imaginary conversation with Helen, trying to convince her, in three fantasy sequences, that he is irresistible to women, including his secretary, a nurse, and Helen's bridesmaid, but she laughs it off. A potted tomato plant falls onto his lounge chair; the seemingly unclad attractive young woman upstairs apologizes for accidentally knocking it off her balcony, and Richard invites her down for a drink.

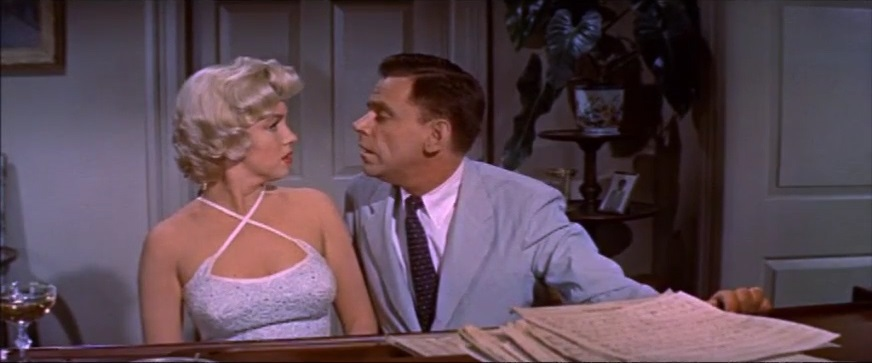
Ewell reprised his Broadway role and Monroe replaced Vanessa Brown

Theatrical trailer

While waiting for her to arrive, he vacillates between a fantasy of her as a femme fatale overcome by his playing of Rachmaninoff's Second Piano Concerto, and guilt at betraying his wife. When she appears, she is wearing pink pajamas and turns out to be a naïve and innocent young woman who works as a television toothpaste spokeswoman and recently appeared—highly enticingly—in a popular photo almanac. After repeatedly viewing her revealing pose his overactive imagination begins to run wild. On his suggestion, she brings back a bottle of champagne from her apartment and returns in a seductive white dress. Richard, overcome by his fantasies, awkwardly grabs at her while they are playing a "Chopsticks" duet on the piano, toppling them off the piano bench. He apologizes, but she says it happens to her all the time. Guilt-ridden, he asks her to leave.

Richard worries that Helen will find out about his transgression the following day at work, even though she is unaware of it and only wants Richard to send Ricky his paddle. Richard's waning resolve to resist temptation fuels his fear that he is succumbing to the "Seven Year Itch". Dr. Brubaker arrives at his office to discuss the book but is of no help. When Richard keeps hearing of his wife spending time with her attractive, hunky writer friend McKenzie in Maine, he imagines they are carrying on an affair; in retaliation, he invites the young woman out to dinner and a film. They go see Creature from the Black Lagoon in air-conditioned luxury. As the two chat while walking home, she briefly stands over a subway grate to enjoy its updraft, creating the iconic Monroe scene in her pleated white halterneck dress, her skirt blowing up in the breeze. He then invites her to spend the night at his air-conditioned apartment so she can rest up and look her best for the next day's television appearance, with him on the couch and her in his bed.

In the morning, Richard argues with then assaults the man he imagined was having an affair with his wife in Maine. After knocking him cold, he comes to his senses and, fearing his wife's retribution (within his dream), tells the woman she can stay in his apartment while he leaves to catch the train for two weeks in Maine.

== Cast ==
- Marilyn Monroe as The Girl (credited as such, though Richard Sherman satirically remarks "maybe she's Marilyn Monroe")
- Tom Ewell as Richard Sherman (billed as Tommy Ewell)
- Evelyn Keyes as Helen Sherman
- Sonny Tufts as Tom MacKenzie
- Robert Strauss as Kruhulik
- Oscar Homolka as Dr. Brubaker
- Marguerite Chapman as Miss Morris
- Victor Moore as plumber
- Donald MacBride as Mr. Brady
- Roxanne as Elaine
- Carolyn Jones as Nurse Finch
- Tom Nolan as Ricky Sherman (uncredited)
- Doro Merande as waitress at vegetarian restaurant (uncredited)
- Kathleen Freeman as woman at vegetarian restaurant (uncredited)
- Duke Fishman as commuter at station (uncredited)

== Production ==
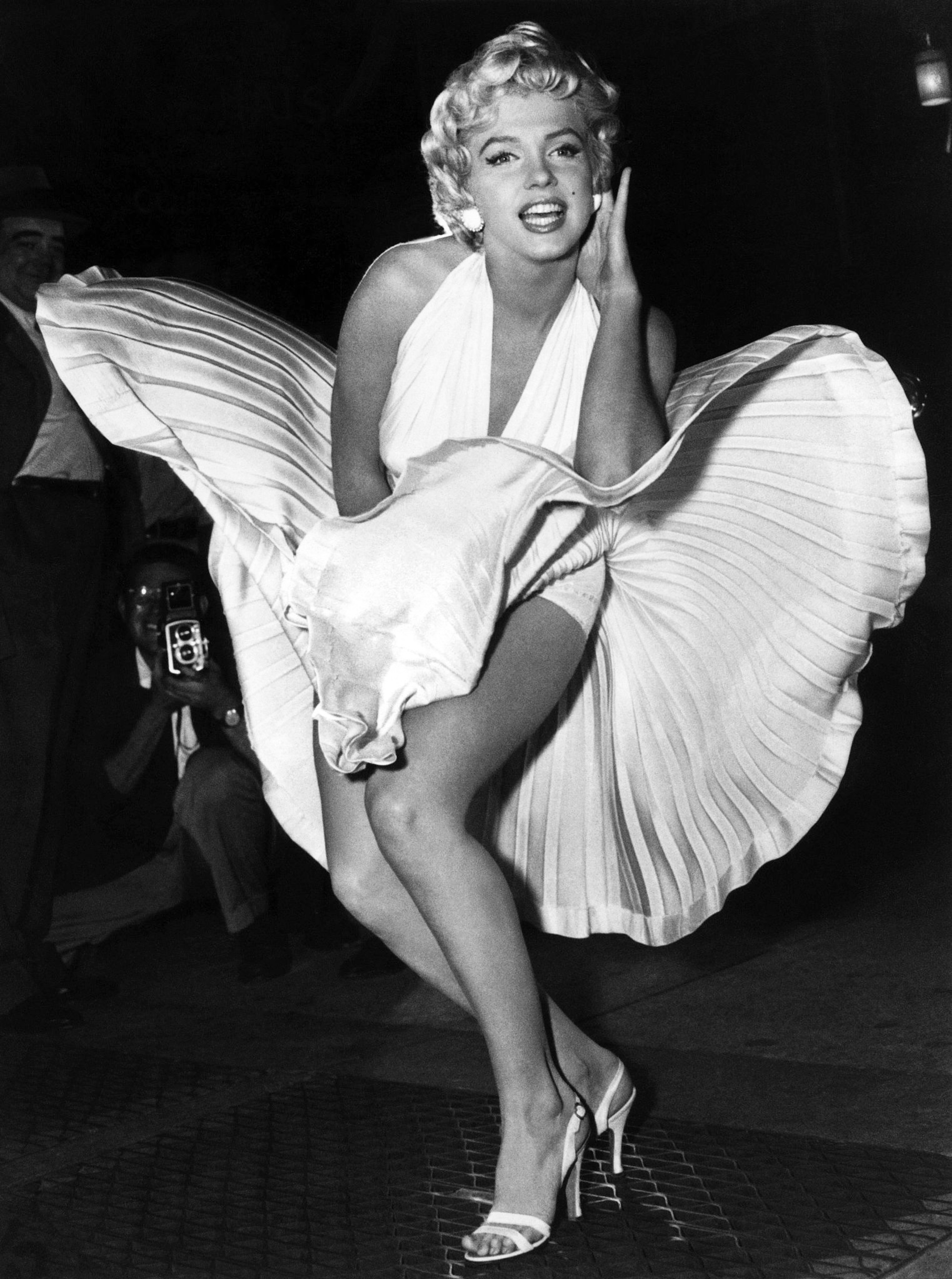
Monroe posing for photographers while filming the famous subway grate scene for the film, September 1954

The Seven Year Itch was filmed between September and November 1954 and is Wilder's only film released by 20th Century-Fox. The characters of Elaine (Dolores Rosedale), Marie, and the inner voices of Sherman and The Girl were dropped from the play; the characters of the Plumber, Miss Finch (Carolyn Jones), the Waitress (Doro Merande), and Kruhulik the janitor (Robert Strauss) were added. Many lines and scenes from the play were cut or re-written because they were deemed indecent by the Hays office.

Axelrod and Wilder complained that the film was being made under straitjacketed conditions. This led to a major plot change: in the play, Sherman and The Girl have sex; in the movie, the romance is reduced to suggestion; Sherman and The Girl kiss three times, once while playing Sherman's piano together, once outside the movie theater and once near the end before Sherman goes to take Ricky's paddle to him. The footage of Monroe's dress billowing over a subway grate was shot at two locations: first on location outside the Trans-Lux 52nd Street Theater (then located at 586 Lexington Avenue in Manhattan), then on a sound stage. Elements of both eventually made their way into the finished film, despite the often-held belief that the original on-location footage's sound had been rendered useless by the overexcited crowd present during filming in New York. The exterior shooting location of Richard's apartment was 164 East 61st Street in Manhattan.

Saul Bass created the abstract title sequence, which was mentioned favorably in numerous reviews; up until that time, it was unheard of for trade press reviews to mention film title sequences.

Monroe's then-husband, famed baseball player Joe DiMaggio, was on set during the filming of the dress scene, and reportedly angry and disgusted with the attention she received from onlookers, reporters, and photographers in attendance. Wilder had invited the media to drum up interest in the film.

George Axelrod later expressed his dislike about changes from the play to the film:

The third act of the play was the guy having hilarious guilts about having been to bed with the girl; but as he had not been to bed with her in the picture, all his guilts were for nothing. So the last act of the picture kind of went down hill.

The writer also felt that "The claustrophic element of the play is what makes it work—the guy trapped in the little apartment, his imagination soaring out of the apartment. When you open the play up, it loses its tension."

== Analysis ==
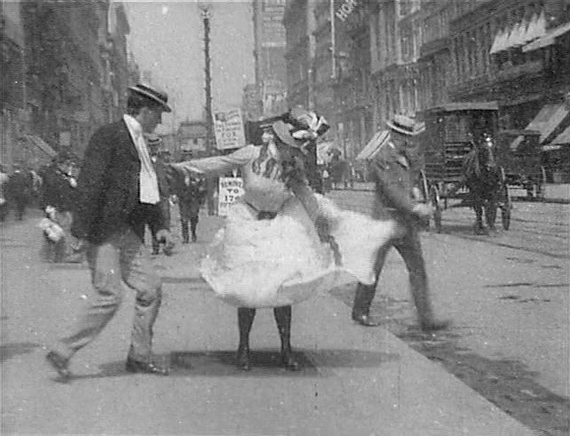
The depiction of Monroe over the grate has been compared to a similar event in the 1901 short film What Happened on Twenty-third Street, New York City.

The New York Times argued that, while the film lacks in clear definition as per its nature, its principal topic is the dynamic between the main male character and the alluring presence of The Girl, who dominates the film. This is in contrast to Axelrod's emphasis on the comical anxieties of Ewell's character, as the reviewer observed that Monroe's performance overshadows Ewell, making her the focal point of attention. The analysis mentioned the potential monotony in Ewell's character's struggles and commented on the limitations imposed by the Production Code, preventing the fulfillment of his desires, thus rendering his ardor somewhat absurd.

In 2015, Vanity Fair author Micah Nathan similarly criticized the moral restrictions imposed by the Hays Code and discussed the central theme of adultery in the context of Monroe's captivating presence. According to Nathan, Monroe compensates for the limitations through her magnetic allure and embodiment of certain archetypes. The vivid description of her character's entrance into the film, with her figure-hugging dress and seductive mannerisms, is highlighted as a pivotal moment. Monroe's on-screen charisma eclipses the remaining aspects of the film, including secondary characters and subplots. The conclusion reflects on the film's underlying theme of boredom rather than lust, with Monroe's character serving as a catalyst for harmless flirtation and reflection on familial values.

== Release ==
=== Box office ===
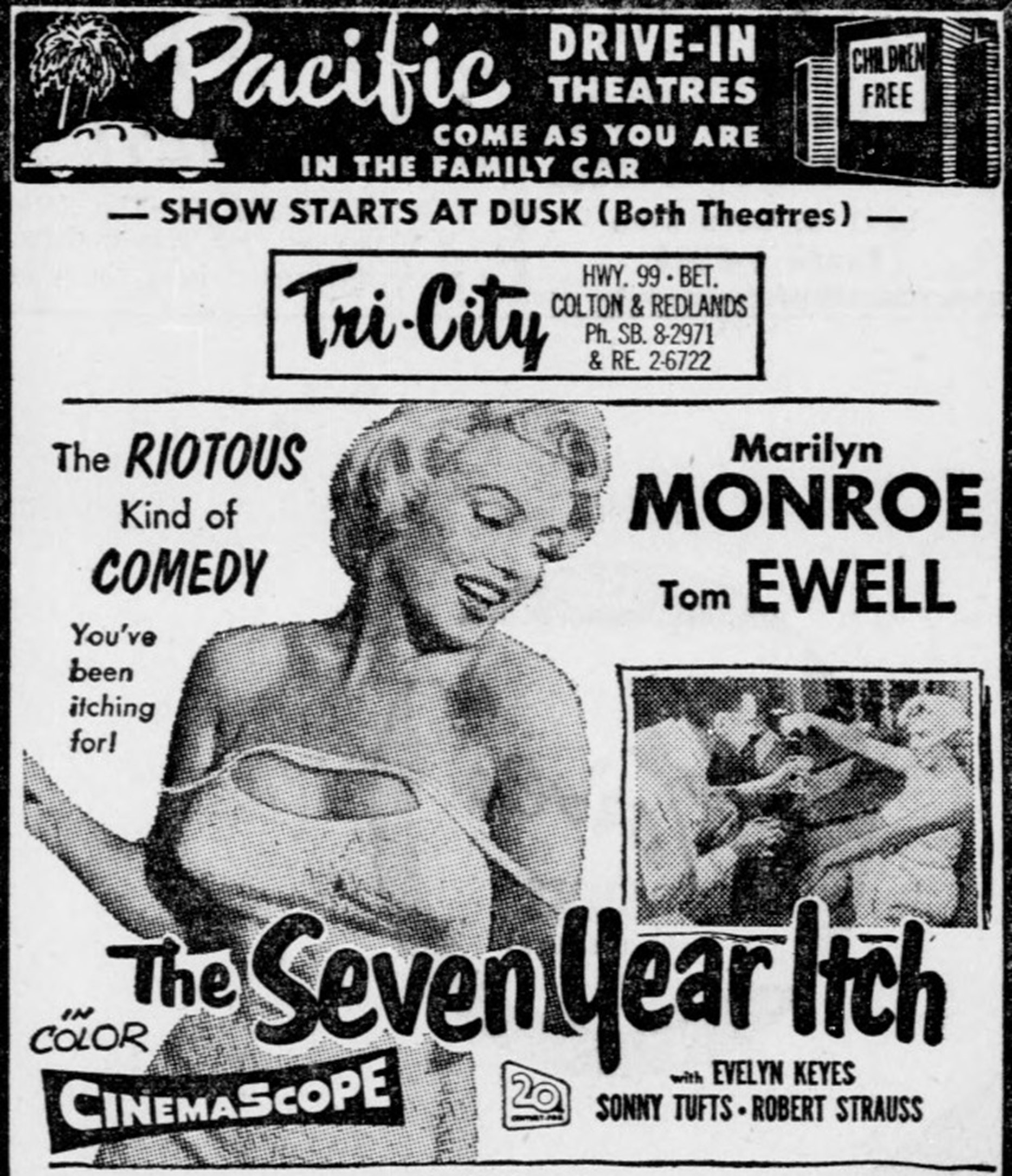
Drive-in advertisement from 1955

A major commercial success, the film earned $6 million in rentals at the North American box office.

=== Critical response ===
The original 1955 review by Variety was largely positive. Though Hollywood production codes prohibited writer-director Billy Wilder from filming a comedy where adultery takes place, the review expressed disappointment that Sherman remains chaste. Some critics compared Richard Sherman to the fantasizing lead character in James Thurber's short story "The Secret Life of Walter Mitty".

On the review aggregation website Rotten Tomatoes, 84% of 32 reviews from critics are positive, with an average rating of 7.2/10.

Years later after its release, Wilder called the film "a nothing picture because the picture should be done today without censorship... Unless the husband, left alone in New York while the wife and kid are away for the summer, has an affair with that girl there's nothing. But you couldn't do that in those days, so I was just straitjacketed. It just didn't come off one bit, and there's nothing I can say about it except I wish I hadn't made it. I wish I had the property now."

=== Rights ===
On March 20, 2019, Rupert Murdoch sold most of 21st Century Fox's film and television assets to The Walt Disney Company, and The Seven Year Itch was one of the films included in the deal.

=== Awards and honors ===
Date of ceremony	Award	Category	Recipients and nominees	Result	Ref.
January 29, 1956	Directors Guild of America Award	Outstanding Directorial Achievement in Motion Pictures	Billy Wilder	Nominated	
February 23, 1956	Golden Globe Award	Best Actor – Motion Picture Musical or Comedy	Tom Ewell	Won	
March 1, 1956	BAFTA Award	Best Foreign Actress	Marilyn Monroe	Nominated	
1956	Writers Guild of America Award	Best Written Comedy	Billy Wilder and George Axelrod	Nominated	

In 2000, American Film Institute included the film as No. 51 in AFI's 100 Years...100 Laughs. The film was included in "The New York Times Guide to the Best 1,000 Movies Ever Made" in 2002.

== See also ==
- List of American films of 1955
- Forever Marilyn – a giant statue of Monroe in the white dress, by John Seward Johnson II
