= Life with Luigi =

American radio comedy series

Luigi Basco (J. Carrol Naish) and Pasquale (Alan Reed) in the CBS-TV series Life with Luigi (1952)

Life with Luigi is an American radio situation comedy series which began September 21, 1948, on CBS Radio and broadcast its final episode on March 3, 1953.

== Plot ==
The action centered on Luigi Basco, an antique shop owner, and his experiences as a newly arrived Italian immigrant in Chicago. Many episodes took place at the night school classes that Luigi attended with other immigrants from different countries. Another common theme involved Luigi's landlord and sponsor, Pasquale, scheming to get Luigi to marry his obese daughter.

== Production ==
Perennial character actor and two-time Academy Award nominee J. Carrol Naish played Luigi.

Life with Luigi was created by Cy Howard, who had earlier created the hit radio comedy, My Friend Irma. The working title was The Little Immigrant, echoed in the sign-off of each episode, "Your lovin-a son-a, Luigi Basco, the li'l immigrant." Other characters on the show included Pasquale (Alan Reed), another Italian immigrant who is always trying to trap Luigi into marrying his daughter Rosa (Jody Gilbert); Miss Spaulding (Mary Shipp), Luigi's night school teacher and ideal woman; and Schultz (Hans Conried), a German immigrant and fellow student in Luigi's citizenship class. The other night school classmates were Horowitz (Joe Forte) and the Swedish Olsen (Ken Peters). Native Chicagoan Jimmy (Gil Stratton), Luigi's young helper at the store, featured in the early episodes. Each episode used the framing device of Luigi narrating a letter to his mother back in Italy.

== Reception ==
The show was popular, successfully competing with Bob Hope's The Pepsodent Show. For most of its run, Life with Luigi aired at 9 p.m. on Tuesdays. Despite an estimated 30% share of the audience in its timeslot, the show was without a sponsor until Wrigley's Gum bought it in 1950, continuing till the show ended in 1953.

== TV version ==
A live CBS Television version aired beginning on September 22, 1952, but was short-lived. Naish, Reed, Gilbert, and Shipp all reprised their radio characters on the television show. Originating at KNXT in Hollywood, the program was sponsored by Instant Maxwell House Coffee. Mac Benoff produced and Norman Tokar directed. Benoff and Lou Derman were the writers, and Lud Gluskin directed the music.

Although it enjoyed high ratings, the show was pulled because of pressure from the Italian-American community. CBS tried to respond to advertisers' concerns by tinkering with the characters, the writing, and replacing Naish, Reed and Gilbert with Vito Scotti, Thomas Gomez, and Muriel Landers respectively, but the revised show was unsuccessful and was cancelled within weeks.
