= Marie Wilson (American actress) =

US actress (1916–1972)

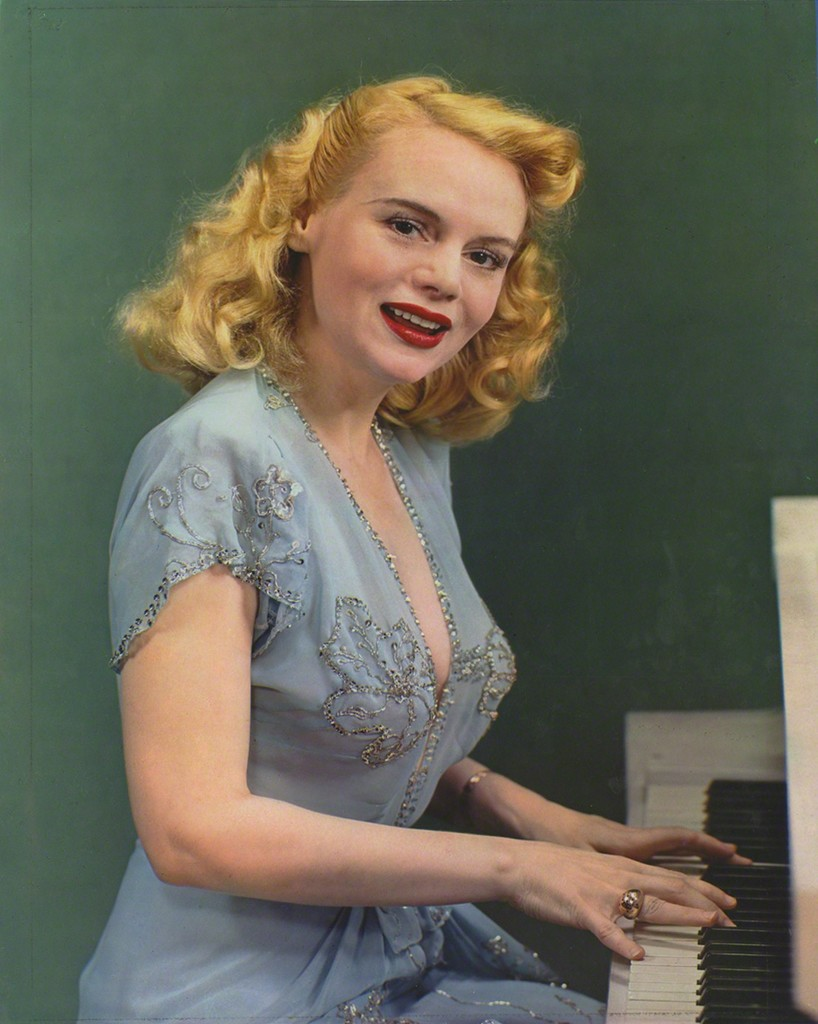
- Wilson in 1947
- Born: Katherine Elizabeth Wilson; August 19, 1916; Anaheim, California, U.S.
- Died: November 23, 1972 (aged 56); Hollywood, California, U.S.
- Occupation: Actress
- Years active: 1934–1972
- Spouses: Allan Nixon (m. 1942; div. 1950); Robert Fallon (m. 1951)

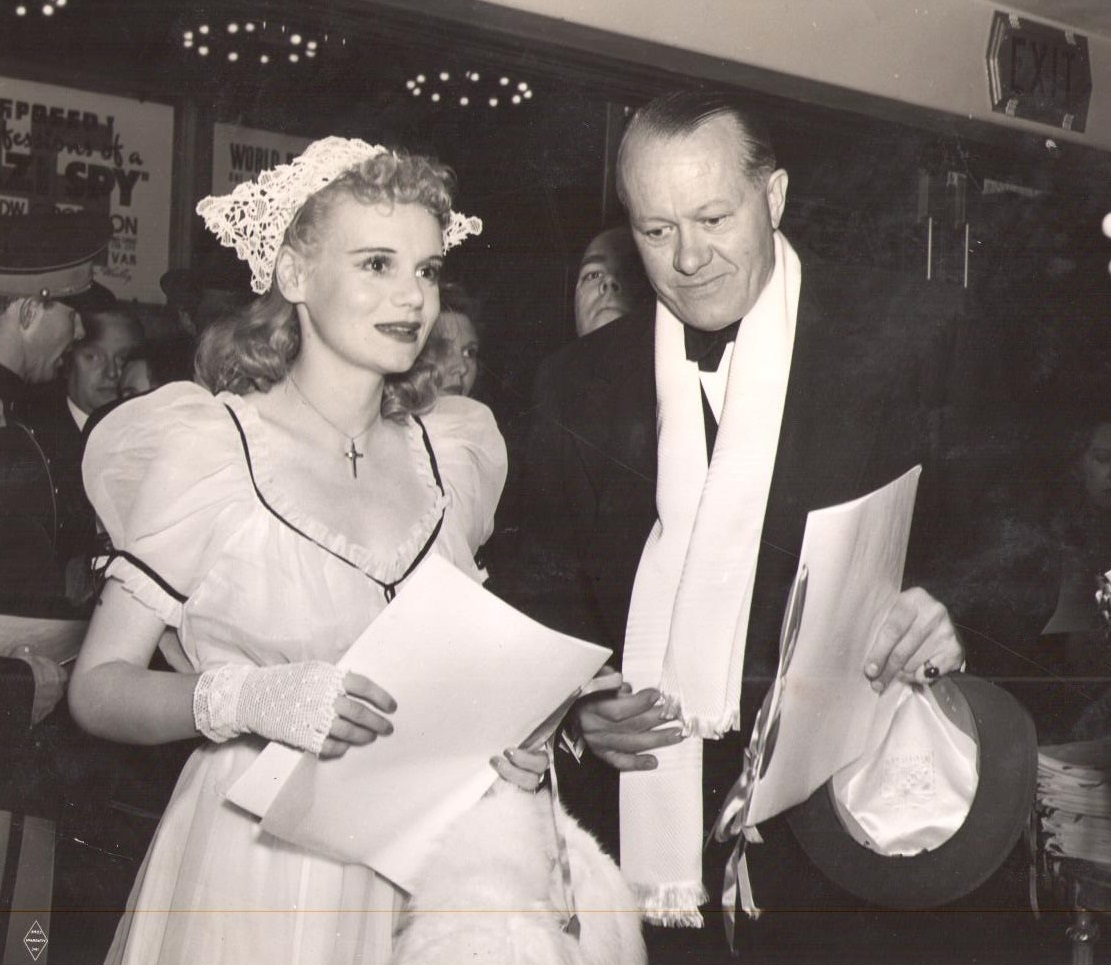
Marie Wilson with director/writer Nick Grinde.

Marie Wilson (born Katherine Elizabeth Wilson; August 19, 1916 – November 23, 1972) was an American radio, film, and television actress. She may be best remembered as the title character in My Friend Irma.

== Early life ==
Wilson was born in Anaheim, California, on August 19, 1916. Her nickname at Anaheim High School was "Maybelle". Wilson graduated from high school in 1933.

== Career ==
=== Radio ===
Although Wilson was afraid of the microphone used in radio, she played scatterbrained Irma Peterson in the radio comedy My Friend Irma from April 11, 1947, to August 23, 1954.

=== Film ===
Wilson began her career in Hollywood in the 1934 film Down to Their Last Yacht as a ship passenger, and then appeared in Babes in Toyland as Mary Quite Contrary. Wilson appeared in Ladies Crave Excitement (1935), The Girl Friend (1935), Stars Over Broadway (1935), Miss Pacific Fleet (1935), The Big Noise (1936), Melody for Two (1937), Boy Meets Girl (1938), Sweepstakes Winner (1939), Virginia (1941), She's in the Army (1942), You Can't Ration Love (1944), Young Widow (1946), and Never Wave at a WAC (1952). Her career got a boost when she performed at Harold Lloyd's Beverly Hills Little Theatre for Professionals, which led to her being cast in Boy Meets Girl in 1938.

In 1936, she played Miss Murgatroyd in Satan Met a Lady, a loose adaptation of the 1929 novel The Maltese Falcon^{1} by Dashiell Hammett. She was in The Great Garrick as Nicolle in 1937. Wilson was in Fools for Scandal as Myrtle in 1938. She was in Waterfront in 1939 as Ruby Waters.

In 1949, she played Irma Peterson in the film My Friend Irma, reprising her role from the radio series. In 1950, she again played Irma in My Friend Irma Goes West. In 1952, she played Jane Sweet in A Girl in Every Port, based on the short story They Sell Sailors Elephants by Frederick Hazlitt Brennan. In 1957, she played Marie Antoinette in The Story of Mankind, loosely based on the nonfiction book The Story of Mankind (1921) by Hendrik Willem van Loon. Wilson's last film was 1962's Mr. Hobbs Takes a Vacation, based on the novel by Edward Streeter.

Wilson also had roles in short films, including Bum Voyage (1934), Slide, Nellie, Slide (1936), Vitaphone Pictorial Revue (Series 2 No. 6) (1938), and Vitaphone Pictorial Revue (Series 2 No. 12).

=== Television ===
Wilson first appeared on television in the series My Friend Irma from 1952 to 1954. She was in two episodes of Burke's Law. Wilson's voice was featured in the short-lived animated television series Where's Huddles?. Her last role was in 1972 as Margaret Cooperman in Love, American Style. Wilson was a guest on The Ed Sullivan Show on four occasions.

=== Stage ===
In June and July 1950, Wilson portrayed Lady Teazle in a production of The School for Scandal at the Circle Theater in Hollywood. She appeared with her husband, Allan Nixon, who played Charles Surface. During February 1958 she starred as Cherie opposite Robert Gist as Bo in a production of Bus Stop at the Sombrero Playhouse in Phoenix, Arizona.

=== Walk of Fame ===
Wilson's talents have been recognized with three stars on the Hollywood Walk of Fame: for radio at 6301 Hollywood Boulevard, for television at 6765 Hollywood Boulevard, and for movies at 6601 Hollywood Boulevard.

=== Sculpture ===
Wilson's left leg was the model for a 35-ft (sometimes referred to as 34-ft), two-ton sculpture outside the Theme Hosiery (later Sanderson Hosiery) plant on Olympic and Barrington in West Los Angeles. The DuPont Co. commissioned the plaster leg, which was painted as if to be wearing nylons, to promote its new nylons product. Wilson was hoisted thigh-level at the sculpture's unveiling August 6, 1949.

== Personal life ==
Wilson was married to actor Allan Nixon from 1942 to 1950. Her 1951 marriage to actor Robert Fallon lasted until her death from cancer at age 56. Wilson was interred in the Columbarium of Remembrance at Forest Lawn Cemetery in Hollywood Hills.

== Filmography ==
=== Film ===
Year	Title	Role	Notes
1934	Down to Their Last Yacht	Ship Passenger	Romantic comedy and musical film directed by Paul Sloane; Uncredited
1934	Babes in Toyland	Mary Quite Contrary	Musical film directed by Charley Rogers and Gus Meins; Based on Victor Herbert's popular 1903 operetta Babes in Toyland.
1935	Ladies Crave Excitement	Girl	Action and comedy film directed by Nick Grinde; Uncredited
1935	The Girl Friend	Girl	Musical film directed by Edward Buzzell
1935	Stars Over Broadway	Molly	Musical film directed by William Keighley
1935	Miss Pacific Fleet	Virginia 'Vergie' Matthews	Comedy film directed by Ray Enright
1935	Broadway Hostess	Dorothy	Romantic comedy musical film directed by Frank McDonald
1936	Colleen	Mabel	Romantic and musical film directed by Alfred E. Green
1936	The Big Noise	Daisy	Comedy and crime film directed by Frank McDonald
1936	Satan Met a Lady	Miss Murgatroyd	Detective film directed by William Dieterle; A loose adaptation of the 1929 novel The Maltese Falcon^{1} by Dashiell Hammett; Directed by Roy Del Ruth
1936	China Clipper	Sunny Avery	Drama film directed by Ray Enright
1936	King of Hockey	Elsie	Drama film directed by Noel M. Smith
1937	Melody for Two	Camille Casey	Musical film directed by Louis King
1937	Public Wedding	Tessie	Comedy film directed by Nick Grinde
1937	Over the Goal	Co-ed	Comedy film directed by Noel M. Smith; Uncredited
1937	The Great Garrick	Nicolle	Historical and comedy film directed by James Whale; Based on the play Ladies and Gentlemen by Ernest Vajda
1938	The Invisible Menace	Sally	Mystery film directed by John Farrow
1938	Fools for Scandal	Myrtle	Screwball comedy produced and directed by Mervyn LeRoy; Based on the unproduced 1936 play Return Engagement by Nancy Hamilton, James Shute, and Rosemary Casey
1938	Boy Meets Girl	Susie	Screwball comedy directed by Lloyd Bacon.
1938	Broadway Musketeers	Miss Connie Todd	Drama film directed by John Farrow
1939	Sweepstakes Winner	Jennie Jones	Comedy film directed by William C. McGann
1939	Waterfront	Ruby Waters	Action and crime film directed by Terry O. Morse; Adapted from the play Blind Spot by Kenyon Nicholson
1939	Should Husbands Work?	Myrtle	Comedy film directed by Gus Meins
1939	The Cowboy Quarterback	Maizie Williams	Comedy film directed by Noel M. Smith
1941	Virginia	Connie Potter	Drama film directed by Edward H. Griffith
1941	Rookies on Parade	Kitty Mulloy	Musical-comedy film directed by Joseph Santley
1941	Flying Blind	Veronica Gimble	Action-comedy film directed by Frank McDonald
1941	Harvard, Here I Come!	Zella Phipps	Comedy film directed by Lew Landers
1942	Broadway	Grace	Crime-drama musical film directed by William A. Seiter
1942	She's in the Army	Susan Slatterty	Comedy-drama film directed by Jean Yarbrough
1944	You Can't Ration Love	Bubbles Keenan	Comedy film directed by Lester Fuller
1944	Shine on Harvest Moon	Margie	Musical-biographical film of the vaudeville team of Nora Bayes and Jack Norworth directed by David Butler
1944	Music for Millions	Marie	Musical-comedy film directed by Henry Koster
1946	Young Widow	'Mac' McCallister	Drama film directed by Edwin L. Marin
1946	No Leave, No Love	Rosalind	Musical film directed by Charles Martin
1947	The Private Affairs of Bel Ami	Rachel Michot	Drama film directed by Albert Lewin
1947	The Fabulous Joe	Gorgeous Gilmore	Comedy film directed by Harve Foster
1947	Linda, Be Good	Margie LaVitte	Comedy film directed by Frank McDonald
1949	My Friend Irma	Irma Peterson	Comedy film directed by George Marshall; Most notable as the film debut of the comedy team Dean Martin and Jerry Lewis; Based upon the radio series My Friend Irma
1950	My Friend Irma Goes West	Irma Peterson	Crime-comedy musical film directed by Hal Walker; Based on the radio show My Friend Irma
1952	Never Wave at a WAC	Clara Schneiderman / Danger O'Dowd	Comedy film directed by Norman Z. McLeod
1952	A Girl in Every Port	Jane Sweet	Comedy film directed by Chester Erskine; Based on the short story They Sell Sailors Elephants by Frederick Hazlitt Brennan
1953	I Was a Burlesque Queen	Margie LaVitte	Drama film written and directed by Sidney W. Pink; Archive footage of 1947's Linda, Be Good
1953	Marry Me Again	Doris	Comedy film written and directed by Frank Tashlin
1957	The Story of Mankind	Marie Antoinette	Directed and co-produced by Irwin Allen; Very loosely based on the nonfiction book The Story of Mankind (1921) by Hendrik Willem van Loon
1962	Mr. Hobbs Takes a Vacation	Mrs. Turner	Comedy film directed by Henry Koster; Based on the novel Mr. Hobbs' Vacation by Edward Streeter

=== Film shorts/documentaries ===
Year	Title	Role	Notes
1934	Bum Voyage	Ship's Passenger at Party	Directed by Nick Grinde
1935	My Girl Sally	Leading actress	Directed by Alfred J. Goulding
1936	Slide, Nellie, Slide	Nellie, the Softball Player	Directed by Ralph Staub
1938	Swingtime in the Movies	Herself	Directed by written by Crane Wilbur
1938	For Auld Lang Syne #3	Herself	Documentary
1938	Vitaphone Pictorial Revue (Series 2 No. 6)	Herself	Directed by Willard Du Brul, Clem McCarthy, and I. Miller
1938	Vitaphone Pictorial Revue (Series 2 No. 12)	Herself	Directed by Lloyd French
1950	Screen Snapshots: The Great Showman	Herself	Directed by Ralph Staub
1954	Screen Snapshots: Hollywood Stars on Parade	Herself	Written and directed by Ralph Staub

=== Television ===
Year	Title	Role	Notes
1952–1954	My Friend Irma	Irma Peterson	Contract role
1962	The Comedy Spot	Ernestine	Episode: "The Soft Touch"
1962	Ernestine	Ernestine McDougal	Made-for-TV-movie directed by Sidney Salkow
1963	Empire	Guest	Episode: "Hidden Asset" (S 1:Ep 26)
1964	Burke's Law	Chuchi Smith	Episode: "Who Killed Marty Kelso?" (S 1:Ep 22)
1964	My Son, the Witch Doctor	Leading actress	Made-for-TV-movie
1965	Burke's Law	Ramona Specks	Episode: "Who Killed Wimbledon Hastings?"( S2:Ep 20)
1968	Mr. Blackwell Presents	Herself	Directed by William Edwards and William Stierwalt
1969	Jack Cassidy's St. Patrick's Day TV Special	Singer	Directed by William Rainbolt
1970	Where's Huddles?	Penny McCoy	Contract role
1972	Love, American Style	Margaret Cooperman	Episode: "Love and the Girlish Groom / Love and the New You / Love and the Oldlyweds / Love and the Wishing Star" (S 4:Ep 4)
