= My Friend Irma (disambiguation) =

My Friend Irma is an American radio and television series of the 1940s and 1950s.

My Friend Irma may refer to:

- My Friend Irma (TV series), the TV adaptation of the radio series
- My Friend Irma (film), a 1949 film directed by George Marshall, based upon the radio series

== See also ==
- My Friend Irma Goes West, a 1950 film
