= Vitaphone Pictorial Revue =

Vitaphone Pictorial Revue (sometimes spelled “Review”) was a series of 9-11 minute newsreel oriented (documentary) film shorts produced by Vitaphone and Warner Brothers.

== Overview ==
Mostly edited in New York at the Vitaphone studio, but a few also made in California with Gordon Hollingshead producing, these were human-interest newsreels that resembled such rival series like “Pathé Audio Review”, distributed by RKO Pictures, and Paramount Pictures “Paramount Pictorial”. Each film is divided into three or four separate segments. In a couple, a segment was presented in Cinecolor.

The series lasted just two years in the 1930s and was mostly forgotten until Turner Classic Movies started showing a few as filler between feature presentations, sometimes with the color segments missing.

== Listing of films ==
Title (identified by number)	Vitaphone #	release date	Narrators	Subjects covered & additional notes
Hollywood Fashion Parade	1967	June 1936	Roy Saunders & Joseph Bolton	Pilot film features a Canadian baby contest, a female alligator tamer and the title sequence in color
No. 1	2233	September 12, 1936	Howard Claney	All titles called Vitaphone Pictorial Revue: covers tap dancing, ski techniques, lamb stew preparation, modeling fur coats (in color)
No. 2	2234	October 10, 1936	John Young	movie stardom methods, steak cooking lesson, household gadgets invented by women, fashion models (in color)
No. 3	2235	November 21, 1936	Paul Douglas	false eyelashes, a female football team and knitted fashion
No. 4	2236	December 23, 1936	Howard Claney	machine testing of consumer products, testing balance & coordination, snow swimming, Southern fashions (in color); aired on TCM
No. 5	2237	February 13, 1937	Paul Douglas	tuna fishing, Arthur Treacher's dill sauce, strange animal friends, cruise ships
No. 6	2238	March 20, 1937	Kelvin Keech	swimming lessons, cosmetics, racing trotters, Swiss wood carving.
No. 7	2239	April 10, 1937	Basil Ruysdael	fishing, recording techniques, women's polo, lipstick manufacturing (in color)
No. 8	2240	April 10, 1937	Paul Douglas	melon bowling, latest coiffures, shoe fashion, the use of cotton in paving streets
No. 9	2241	May 1, 1937	Howard Claney	odd gadgets, home accidents, men's hats and beachwear fashions (color)
No. 10	2242	May 24, 1937	Basil Ruysdael	water dancing, hotel dishwashers, angora rabbits, Moroccan crafts
No. 11	2243	June 19, 1937	Alan Kent	the US Postal Service, smart dogs, milk, oriental rugs
No. 12	2244	July 17, 1937	Howard Claney	an expert child golfer, piano manufacturing, a baby genius, mural painting by Dean Cornwell (in “Naturalcolor”)
No. 13	2245	August 28, 1937	Paul Douglas	good driving skills, book publishing, reducing weight, mink coats
No. 2-1 (or #B)	51B	September 18, 1937	Basil Ruysdael & Clem McCarthy	a racetrack opening with Hollywood stars (Bing Crosby included), wrestling rehearsals, gruyere cheese in Switzerland
No. 2-2 (or #C)	52B	October 16, 1937	Alan Kent & Clem McCarthy	Billy and Bobby Mauch, Margaret Lindsay, table tennis, autumn fashions (color)
No. 2-3 (or #D)	53B	November 13, 1937	Howard Claney & Clem McCarthy	Highlights: champion retrievers, a Hollywood rodeo, plastics
No. 2-4 (or #14)	54B	December 11, 1937	Alan Kent & Clem McCarthy	a handicapped artist, fighters in training, the making of rubber dolls
No. 2-5 (or #15)	55B	January 1, 1938	Howard Claney & Clem McCarthy	making ice cream, jockeys, glamorous women's outfits for the home (color)
No. 2-6 (or #E)	56B	February 5, 1938	Alan Kent & Clem McCarthy	Arabian horses, ice hockey, shoe manufacture, stars Ronald Reagan and Marie Wilson; aired on TCM
No. 2-7 (or #16)	57B	February 19, 1938	Basil Ruysdael & Clem McCarthy	more dogs, a billiard champion.
No. 2-8 (or #F)	58B	April 2, 1938	Howard Claney & Clem McCarthy	songwriters Johnny Mercer & Harry Warren, bowling, rubber bathing suits
No. 2-9 (or #17)	59B	April 30, 1938	Alan Kent & Clem McCarthy	silver-smith, ice boating, model trains
No. 2-10 (or #18)	60B	June 4, 1938	Maida Severn, Clem McCarthy & Ben Grauer	beavers, polo, wool manufacture; aired on TCM
No. 2-11 (or #19)	61B	July 9, 1938	Maida Severn, Clem McCarthy & Ben Grauer	plastics, greyhounds, perfume manufacturing; aired on TCM
No. 2-12 (or #20)	62B	August 13, 1938	Maida Severn, Clem McCarthy & Ben Grauer	Gordon Hollingshead (producer); Lloyd French (director); Hollywood glamour girl, racing shells & fur coats (parts in “Naturalcolor”)

== See also ==
- List of short subjects by Hollywood studio#Warner Brothers
