= The Dark Mirror (1946 film) =

1946 film by Robert Siodmak

- Theatrical release poster
- Directed by: Robert Siodmak
- Screenplay by: Nunnally Johnson
- Story by: Vladimir Pozner
- Produced by: Nunnally Johnson
- Starring: Olivia de Havilland; Lew Ayres; Thomas Mitchell
- Cinematography: Milton R. Krasner
- Edited by: Ernest J. Nims
- Music by: Dimitri Tiomkin
- Color process: Black and white
- Production companies: International Pictures; Nunnally Johnson Productions
- Distributed by: Universal Pictures
- Release date: October 18, 1946 (New York City)
- Running time: 85 minutes
- Country: United States
- Language: English
- Box office: $2,750,000 (US rentals)

The Dark Mirror is a 1946 American psychological horror thriller film directed by Robert Siodmak starring Olivia de Havilland as twins and Lew Ayres as their psychiatrist. The film marks Ayres' return to motion pictures following his conscientious objection to service in World War II. De Havilland had begun to experiment with method acting at the time and insisted that everyone in the cast meet with a psychiatrist. The film anticipates producer/screenwriter Nunnally Johnson's psycho-docu-drama The Three Faces of Eve (1957). Vladimir Pozner's original story on which the film is based was nominated for an Academy Award.

== Plot ==
Dr. Frank Peralta is stabbed to death in his apartment one night. The detective on the case, Lt. Stevenson, quickly finds two witnesses putting Peralta's girlfriend, Terry Collins, at the scene. However, when Stevenson finds and questions Terry, she has an iron-clad alibi, and several witnesses of her own. It is revealed that Terry has an identical twin sister, Ruth, and the pair share a job and routinely switch places for their own benefit. Stevenson and the district attorney are unable to prosecute since the twins refuse to confirm which of them has the alibi.

Unable to accept the "perfect crime", Lt. Stevenson asks Dr. Scott Elliot for help. Scott is an expert on twin study, and has been routinely encountering the Collinses at their shared workplace but does not know which is which. As a front, Scott asks Terry and Ruth if he can study them individually as part of his research. The twins accept, though Ruth is worried that Scott might find out that Terry was at Peralta's apartment the night of the murder. However, Terry is attracted to Scott and insists that they can keep the secret for the sake of seeing him. She also comforts Ruth, reminding her that she was only at Peralta's apartment but didn't kill him.

From Scott's psychological tests and by spending time with them, he discovers that Ruth is kind and loving, while Terry is highly intelligent and insane, and has been manipulating Ruth almost their entire lives. Terry is jealous that people keep preferring Ruth over her, and is enraged yet again when Scott falls in love with Ruth instead of her. Terry starts methodically gaslighting Ruth, making her believe that she's hallucinating and going insane, in the hopes of pushing her to suicide.

Scott reports his findings to Stevenson, who advises him to warn Ruth immediately. That night, Scott arranges to meet with Ruth at his apartment, but Terry intercepts the message. Terry leaves Ruth alone in their apartment and sets a music box in a hidden place to encourage Ruth to believe she's developing the madness erroneously believed always to afflict one of two twins. Terry goes to meet Scott, and he explains everything he's learned about the twins' relationship and Terry's intense rivalry with her innocent sister, knowing all along that he's speaking to Terry, not to Ruth. Scott also believes that Peralta, who didn't know they were twins, wooed Terry but was really in love with Ruth, and Terry killed him for it. When Scott receives a call from the Lieutenant Stevenson, Terry considers stabbing him in the back with the nearby scissors. Stevenson is at the twins' apartment, having gone there on a hunch, and says he's found Ruth dead.

Scott and Terry go to the sisters' apartment, where Terry "confesses" to Stevenson that her "sister" killed Peralta and committed suicide out of guilt. Terry confirms all of Scott's psychological test results, but she herself claims to be Ruth, and says that she's relieved that "Terry” is dead. Just then Ruth enters the room, alive and well, which causes Terry angrily to throw her glass at a mirror reflecting the real Ruth's image. Stevenson did visit Ruth on a hunch but only found her in distress, not dead; he then faked the phone call to trap Terry, who is arrested. Scott and Ruth are free to enjoy their future together.

== Cast ==
- Olivia de Havilland as twins Terry and Ruth Collins
- Lew Ayres as Dr. Scott Elliott
- Thomas Mitchell as Lt. Stevenson
- Richard Long as Rusty
- Charles Evans as Dist. Atty. Girard
- Garry Owen as Franklin (as Gary Owen)
- Lela Bliss as Mrs. Didriksen
- Lester Allen as George Benson

== Hollywood and the genre of “abnormal psychology” ==
German-American filmmaker Siodmak's The Dark Mirror is a melodrama representative of a Hollywood genre emerging in the 1940s concerning Abnormal psychology and its treatment through Psychoanalysis.

The cinematic handling of the topic in The Dark Mirror reflected Siodmak's roots in German expressionism. Film historian Andrew Sarris observed that Siodmak's Hollywood films “were more Germanic than his [German]-made films. (the director fled Nazi dominated Europe in 1940). The application of the techniques of German expressionism are evident through the use of chiaroscuro shadow, distortions in sound effects and dialogue and the use of mirrors to emphasize the psychotic descent of the characters, culminating in a “genuine tour de force.”

Siodmak directed a series of psychological dramas in subsequent years including Phantom Lady (1944), Christmas Holiday (1944), The Suspect (1945), The Strange Affair of Uncle Harry (1945) and The Killers (1946), the latter an adaption of Ernest Hemingway’s short story.

== Reception ==
When first released the staff at Variety magazine gave the film a mixed review, writing, "The Dark Mirror runs the full gamut of themes currently in vogue at the box office - from psychiatry to romance back again to the double identity gimmick and murder mystery. But, despite the individually potent ingredients, somehow the composite doesn't quite come off...Lew Ayres is cast in his familiar role as a medico - a specialist on identical twins. Slightly older looking and sporting a mustache, Ayres still retains much of his appealing boyish sincerity. But in the romantic clinches, Ayres is stiff and slightly embarrassed looking. Copping thespic honors, despite a relatively light part, Thomas Mitchell plays the baffled dick with a wry wit and assured bearing that carries belief."

In her 2019 biography, Olivia de Havilland: Lady Triumphant, Victoria Amador quotes James Agee's November 9, 1946, review in The Nation: “I very much like Olivia de Havilland’s performance,” Agee wrote. “She has for a long time been one of the prettiest women in movies; lately she has not only become prettier than ever, but has started to act.” Agee called the film "a smooth and agreeable melodrama ... The picture could have been more exciting if Nunnally Johnson and his colleagues had risked more subtlety and puzzlement in the psychologizing, the situations, and the everyday performance of the sisters ... As far as they go with it, they do it very intelligently."

Bosley Crowther, film critic for The New York Times, was critical, writing, "The Dark Mirror, like so many of its ilk, suffers from its author's lack of ingenuity to resolve his puzzle in a satisfying manner. As in his earlier and superior mystery, The Woman in the Window, Mr. Johnson solves the problem with a bit of trickery which is no credit to his craftsmanship. Still, one must hand it to Mr. Johnson for keeping his audience guessing, if not always entertained."

In a 9 February 1947 review in Australia's Daily Telegraph, Josephine O'Neill wrote: “This engrossing psychological drama frames a remarkable performance by Olivia de Havilland... so thoughtful and subtle that each girl becomes a clear-cut personality early in the film. That production trick of identity jewels to distinguish the pair is unnecessary. In fact, Olivia's is the Academy Award work of the year... The quiet, distinguished production...obtains an extraordinary amount of suspense with the minimum of action... Robert Siodmak's clever, low-keyed direction is as unusual as his cast... (Lew) Ayres does a fine, sensitive, and charming job. Thomas Mitchell... is in excellent form... it's a long time since Mitchell has had so good a story. To sum up: one of the best in its class.”

Bank of America repossessed the film from its producers.

In the August 15, 1991, issue of The New York Review of Books, Geoffrey O'Brien included The Dark Mirror in a list of 16 videos leading a piece headlined “The Return of Film Noir!”

As of May 2026, Rotten Tomatoes gives the film a rating of 78% fresh, based on 9 reviews, all of them dating from the 21st century. The site quotes Richard Brody's positive review in the November 26, 2012, issue of The New Yorker: "Its evocation of biological destiny wrenches the modernistic romance into tragedy."

== Remake ==
The Dark Mirror was remade as a TV film in 1984 with Jane Seymour as the twins, Stephen Collins as the psychiatrist, and Vincent Gardenia as the detective.
