= Merry Christmas, Mr. Baxter =

1956 novel by Edward Streeter

- First edition
- Author: Edward Streeter
- Language: English
- Genre: Novel
- Publication date: 1956
- Publication place: United States
- Preceded by: Mr. Hobbs Takes a Vacation
- Followed by: Mr. Robbins Rides Again

Merry Christmas, Mr. Baxter was a novel written and published in 1956 by American author Edward Streeter. It was preceded in his list of novels by Mr. Hobbs' Vacation in 1954, and followed by Mr. Robbins Rides Again in 1958. It is a humorous view of a successful businessman's methodical approach to "this Christmas business", contrasted with his wife's chiding scorn over his "typical businessman's approach to something beautiful and intangible". The book was published in the fall of 1956 by Harper & Brothers, New York City, and is 181 pages in length in the original edition. The illustrations were by Dorthea Warren Fox. The book is divided into four sections: "October", "November", "December", and "Christmas Eve", which are further divided by numbered chapters. A Reader's Digest Condensed Books edition was also published in the Fall of 1956, with illustrations by Charles Hawes.

== Synopsis ==
George Barton Baxter, the successful CEO of a New York textile house is returning to his Park Avenue apartment from work one mid-October evening. His thoughts turn to the onset of cooler weather, which will bring Christmas around once again. He considers the economic impact on his personal finances grimly, and upon arriving home, he takes a short rest before dinner, fantasizing about the type of gifts he would really like, but which he knows are impossible pipe dreams. He also reflects briefly on the gifts he will likely receive - none of which he really needs or will use.

At dinner that evening, he discusses a "Christmas Budget" with his wife, who considers the idea ridiculous - but Mr. Baxter persists. They do mutually decide that their Christmas card list can be cut severely, saving some money there. After deletions and then "necessary" additions, it has expanded by more than 30 names. Purchasing their Christmas cards also turns out to be a much more expensive proposition than planned. This pattern continues throughout the approaching weeks to the Christmas season, and the general circumstances of the impending holiday seem to dog Mr. Baxter's thrifty soul at every turn. Complicating the situation is the heart's desire of his own wife: A mink stole, an idea he rejects outright, though he knows even then, subconsciously, that is exactly what he will eventually buy for her.

A disastrous attempted lunchtime shopping trip for a minor gift, the exhausting round of pre-Christmas office parties, and the "invisible hands" of the many service people in his everyday world being extended for a Christmas gratuity all combine to increase his feeling of helplessness in the face of the Christmas juggernaut. But the "season-proof" common sense of his secretary Miss Gillyard, and especially his impulsive gesture in inviting a lower-ranking office member out for a drink on Christmas Eve afternoon begin to kindle a faint glow of Christmas spirit within him, culminating in a hilarious attempt at buying a final gift for his wife in Saks Fifth Avenue later that day.

Arriving home at last, Mr. Baxter relaxes after dinner in the living room, admiring the tree and the pile of gifts beneath, which he fully realizes is largely his wife's work. As they prepare to leave the living room for bed, they enter a poignant dialog about the impact and meaning of Christmas, culminating with his wife telling him affectionately: "You love it - you love every bit of it!" to which Mr. Baxter does not disagree, as his wife bids him goodnight with "Merry Christmas, Mr. Baxter".

== Background ==
Streeter was a long-time resident of New York City, and had just retired as a vice-president of The Bank of New York at the time he wrote this novel. His descriptions of mid-20th century New York are insightful, and filled with a combination of equal parts cynicism, dry wit and affection, as was his typical writing style.

== Television adaptation ==
The story was dramatized as an episode of the NBC anthology series The Alcoa Hour on December 2, 1956. Dennis King starred as Mr. Baxter, with Patricia Benoit as his wife and Margaret Hamilton as Miss Gillyard.

== See also ==
- Edward Streeter
