= Waterfront (1939 film) =

1939 film by Terry O. Morse

- Directed by: Terry O. Morse
- Written by: Lee Katz; Arthur Ripley; Fred Niblo, Jr. Don Ryan
- Based on: Blind Spot by Kenyon Nicholson
- Produced by: Bryan Foy; Hal B. Wallis; Jack L. Warner
- Starring: Gloria Dickson; Dennis Morgan; Marie Wilson
- Cinematography: James Van Trees
- Edited by: Louis Hesse
- Music by: Heinz Roemheld
- Distributed by: Warner Bros. Pictures
- Release date: July 15, 1939
- Running time: 59 minutes
- Country: United States
- Language: English

Waterfront is a 1939 Warner Bros. crime-drama film directed by Terry O. Morse and starring Gloria Dickson, Dennis Morgan and Marie Wilson. It was adapted from the play Blind Spot by Kenyon Nicholson. It is preserved at the Library of Congress.

== Plot ==
Jim Dolen, head of a dockworkers' union, cannot resist a good fight until he meets Ann Stacey, to whom he promises to stop fighting in order to marry her. When his brother Dan Dolen is accidentally killed by Mart Hendler, Jim, with the aid of his pal Frankie Donahue, sneaks out to look for Mart.

Mart is hiding out with his girlfriend Marie. They plan to leave on a ship but do not have enough money. Fearing that Jim might kill Mart, perhaps even in the courtroom, Marie convinces Ann to give her $100 to abscond Mart out of the country and away from Jim. Still bent on revenge, Jim learns what Ann has done and confronts her, but she threatens to shoot him to prevent him from killing Mart. He takes the gun from her. Ann locks Jim in the apartment, and when he shoots the lock off, she tells the police, landing him safely in jail for a few hours. Meanwhile, Mart is overcome with fear that Ann will betray them.

With Frankie's help, Jim escapes from jail. Ann races to warn Mart and Marie but arrives at their hideout just moments ahead of Jim. Mart knocks Ann unconscious, places her in the closet and hides by hanging from the window sill. Jim is horrified when he almost shoots Ann through the closet door, and Mart falls to his death when his foothold gives way.

In Judge Scott's chambers, Father Dunn presents himself as Jim's "mouthpiece" and pleads eloquently for Jim, blaming the environment of the waterfront. The judge commutes Dolen's sentence to probation and remands Jim to the custody of Father Dunn and Ann.

Father Dunn says goodbye to Ann and Jim, who are now married, as their train leaves for a better place.

== Cast ==
- Gloria Dickson as Ann Stacey
- Dennis Morgan as James 'Jim' Dolan
- Marie Wilson as Ruby Waters
- Sheila Bromley as Marie Cordell
- Larry Williams as Frankie Donahue
- Aldrich Bowker as Father Dunn
- Frank Faylen as Skids Riley
- Ward Bond as Mart Hendler
- Arthur Gardner as Dan Dolan
- George Lloyd as Joe Becker
