= Never Wave at a WAC =

1953 film by Norman Z. McLeod

- Directed by: Norman Z. McLeod
- Written by: Ken Englund
- Story by: Frederick Kohner; Frederick Brady
- Produced by: Frederick Brisson
- Starring: Rosalind Russell; Paul Douglas; Marie Wilson
- Cinematography: William H. Daniels
- Edited by: Stanley E. Johnson
- Music by: Elmer Bernstein
- Production company: Independent Artists Pictures
- Distributed by: RKO Radio Pictures
- Release date: January 28, 1953
- Running time: 87 minutes
- Country: United States
- Language: English
- Box office: $1.6 million (US)

Never Wave at a WAC is a 1953 American comedy film directed by Norman Z. McLeod, and starring Rosalind Russell, Paul Douglas and Marie Wilson.

== Plot ==
Divorced socialite Jo McBain, daughter of United States Senator Reynolds, would like to join her boyfriend in Paris where he has been transferred with two other military comrades. She speaks with her father, who has the idea of her joining the army and getting her an officer's commission in the Women's Army Corps so she can be transferred to Paris. He sells her this idea, telling her that she would start as a general. Her wealthy and spoiled manners are crushed immediately, when she arrives at basic training camp she discovers that she is to start at the bottom. Her father is involved in the telephone chain of people making the decision.

Her ex-husband Andrew McBain is working as an Army uniforms designer and he uses his position to disrupt her romantic plans by making her join a group of girls who are testing polar equipment. After she has had enough of her ex-husband's silly pranks, she blows up at her commanding officers and is to be dismissed from the Army. Her contrite ex-husband admits his faults to the disciplinary hearing, but Jo confesses that she was faking being a good soldier so she could go to Paris and be with her boyfriend. She leaves the Army, but she makes a lifelong friend in Clara, who tells Jo she will ask her boyfriend to marry her.

When she leaves the Army, Jo watches as new recruits are brought in. She realizes that she's still in love with her ex-husband (and he with her). She decides to reenlist back into the Army, a genuine attempt at being a good soldier this time, willing to do what the Army asks her to do. She says that later, after her graduation, she may be stationed near Andrew, her ex-husband.

== Cast ==
- Rosalind Russell as Jo McBain
- Paul Douglas as Andrew McBain
- Marie Wilson as Clara Schneiderman / Danger O'Dowd
- William Ching as Lt. Col. Schuyler 'Sky' Fairchild
- Arleen Whelan as Sgt. Toni Wayne
- Leif Erickson as Sgt. Norbert 'Noisy' Jackson
- Hillary Brooke as First Lt. Phyllis Turnbull
- Charles Dingle as Sen. Tom Reynolds
- Lurene Tuttle as Capt. Murchinson
- Regis Toomey as Gen. Ned Prager
- Frieda Inescort as Lily Mae Gorham
- Louise Beavers as Artamesa
- Omar N. Bradley as Himself
- Vince Townsend Jr. as Henry
- Helen Foster as Capt. Finch
- Marjorie Bennett as Mrs. Martha Pratt
- Louise Lorimer as Col. Fullbright
- Lucia Carroll as Lt. Kohler
- Barbara Woodell as Capt. Smith
- Madelon Baker as Capt. McGrady (billed as Madelon Mitchel)
- Virginia Christine as Lt. Myles

== See also ==
- The WAC from Walla Walla
- Private Benjamin
