= William Tell Overture (Spike Jones song) =

Song by Spike Jones

Single by Spike Jones and his City Slickers
- B-side: "By The Beautiful Sea"
- Released: April 26, 1948
- Genre: Parody
- Label: RCA Victor
- Composer: Gioacchino Rossini

Spike Jones and his City Slickers recorded a musical parody that uses themes from Gioachino Rossini's William Tell Overture. It was recorded along with sound effects and humorous horse race calls performed by Doodles Weaver, in the style of the famous announcer Clem McCarthy.

Jones released his version as a single in 1948 and it peaked at #6 on the charts. The song was included on the album Spike Jones Is Murdering the Classics in 1971, and it has frequently been included in various "greatest hits" compilations.

The recording begins with the "Storm" portion of the overture played frenetically, with the band accompanied by barking dogs and clanging objects of various kinds. The progression is brought to a sudden end with the "Bang!" of one of the famous guns in Jones's unique percussion section.

The "Call to the Cows" begins with normal instruments and artificial bird chirps. The next part is played on cowbells and bicycle horns, each one in perfect tune, followed by a crash. Finally, the melody is rendered by gargling, concluding with a "belch."

The "Finale," a.k.a. the "Cavalry Charge," is played on the normal instruments of a big band, mostly as an underscore to the commentary of Doodles Weaver, who is describing a horse race. Weaver introduces the racehorses, some of them bearing a name similar to a real horse (Stoogehand for Stagehand, Dogbiscuit for Seabiscuit) and others with joke names ("Girdle" in the stretch, "Cabbage" out by a head, "Banana" out by a bunch, "Assault" passing "Battery", "Mother-in-Law" nagging in the rear ("ARK ARK ARK ARK!").

Perennially trailing the field with distant 20-to-1 odds is the horse Beetlebaum (one of Weaver's radio-show characters was Professor Beetlebaum). The horse's name is always spoken in a deep, two-note "foghorn" cadence. During the race, Beetlebaum keeps falling further and further behind the field. As the race nears its finish, the announcer goes on a tangent, impersonating broadcaster Clem McCarthy, who had called the famous Seabiscuit-War Admiral match race in 1938 and also the Joe Louis-Max Schmeling boxing rematch of the same year. In this case, Weaver's now gravelly-voiced track announcer begins describing a boxing match. The song concludes with Weaver announcing the winner... Beetlebaum!

The City Slickers and Doodles Weaver recorded a sequel, describing the Indianapolis 500 and underscored by Dance of the Hours. Near the conclusion of the race, a horrific accident (or the sound effects thereof) demolishes all the cars, a horse's whinny is heard, and Weaver announces the winner... Beetlebaum!
