= Clarissa Fairchild Cushman =

American author (1889–1980)

- Born: Clarissa White Fairchild; 13 January 1889; USA
- Died: 18 February 1980 (aged 91); Virginia, USA
- Occupation: Novelist
- Writing career
- Language: English
- Notable work: Young Widow

Clarissa Fairchild Cushman (13 Jan 1889 – 18 Feb 1980) was an American author, best known for Young Widow which was turned into a movie starring Jane Russell. She won the Mary Roberts Rinehart Mystery Novel Prize for I Wanted to Murder.

== Personal life ==
She was a member of the Fairchild family. She attended Oberlin College. She married Robert Eugene Cushman in 1916.

== Works ==
- The new poor (1928)
- The bright hill (1936)
- Judith/But for her Garden (1936)
- The side of regret (1938)
- I wanted to murder (1941)
- Young widow (1945)
- The glass barracks
