= My Friend Irma (TV series) =

American comedy TV series

- Genre: Comedy
- Created by: Cy Howard
- Written by: Cy Howard; Jay Sommers; John L. Greene; Paul West
- Directed by: Richard Whorf; George Cahan
- Starring: Marie Wilson; Mary Shipp; Richard Eyer; Cathy Lewis; Gloria Gordon; Donald MacBride; Sid Tomack
- Country of origin: United States
- Original language: English
- No. of seasons: 2
- No. of episodes: 39

Production
- Producers: Cy Howard; Nat Perrin
- Running time: 30 min

Original release
- Network: CBS
- Release: January 8, 1952 – June 25, 1954

My Friend Irma is an American comedy television series that was broadcast on CBS from January 8, 1952, until June 25, 1954.

== Premise and characters ==
My Friend Irma began on radio and moved to television with a similar format. Irma Peterson ("the proverbial dumb blonde") and her roommate lived at Kathleen O'Reilly's boarding house in Manhattan. Irma was secretary for Milton J. Clyde, the owner of a real estate company. Her initial roommate, Jane Stacy, was secretary for Richard Rhinelander III, the owner of an investment company. Stacy's transfer to Panama in 1953 brought Kay Foster, a newspaper reporter, in as Peterson's new roommate. Both Stacy and Foster sometimes spoke directly to the viewers, commenting on developments in an episode, a technique that George Burns used on The George Burns and Gracie Allen Show.

When the program began, Peterson was in love with Al (no last name given), an unemployed con man. Al was replaced by Joe Vance, a "more respectable boyfriend", who worked for a cleaning company. Other characters who frequently appeared were Brad Jackson, Kay's boyfriend; Professor Kropotkin, Irma's neighbor; and Bobby, Peterson's nephew. In 1953-54, Kropotkin was gone and Mr. Corday, an eccentric actor, was added.

== Cast ==
Characters and Actors on My Friend Irma's TV Version
Character	Actor
Irma Peterson	Marie Wilson
Jane Stacy	Cathy Lewis
Kay Foster	Mary Shipp
Al	Sid Tomack
Joe Vance	Hal March
Richard Rhinelander III	Brooks West
Brad Jackson	Gerald Mohr
Milton J. Clyde	Donald MacBride
Professor Kropotkin	Sig Arno
Mrs. O'Reilly	Gloria Gordon
Bobby Peterson	Richard Eyer
Mr. Corday	John Carradine
Richard's mother	Margaret DuMont

Frank Bingham and Bob Lemond were the announcers.

== Schedule and production ==
My Friend Irma debuted at 10:30 p.m. Eastern Time on Tuesdays. From April 1952 through June 1953, it was broadcast at 8:30 p.m. E. T. on Fridays. From October 1953 through June 1954, it was on Fridays at 10 p.m. E. T.

Cy Howard created the program. Richard Whorf was the director, and Nat Perrin was the producer. Howard and Frank Galen were the writers. Sponsors included Lever Brothers (Swan soap), and Kool cigarettes. The October 4, 1952, episode of My Friend Irma came from a "nearly completed" sound stage in CBS's new Television City facilities, making it the first series to be broadcast from that Hollywood site.

== Critical reception ==
Critic Jack Gould wrote in The New York Times that the series's debut episode "was a decided disappointment". He felt that the innocent, fragile nature of Peterson was an asset, but that benefit was undermined because Wilson seemed to recite her lines more than portraying her character. Gould praised Lewis's performance for providing substance and pace. He criticized the writers for using "trite coincidences and old jokes". Whorf's direction received mixed reviews, described as "on the erratic side" although "in some of the lesser scenes he had nice imaginative touches".

== Proposed sequel ==
When My Friend Irma ended, Wilson still had a $100,000-per-year contract with CBS. Network officials worked with Burns to try to develop a sequel, My Wife Irma, with Wilson as the star, but CBS rejected it. My Friend Irma had ended with Peterson's becoming engaged to Vance. The sequel would have picked up with her adapting to life as a newlywed.

== Episode status ==
UCLA has one 1952 episode of the program in its archives.
