= Melody for Two =

1937 film by Louis King

- Directed by: Louis King
- Written by: Richard Macaulay; George Bricker; Luci Ward; Joseph K. Watson; Hugh Cummings; Michael Jacoby
- Produced by: Bryan Foy
- Starring: James Melton; Patricia Ellis; Marie Wilson
- Cinematography: Arthur L. Todd
- Edited by: Jack Saper
- Music by: Heinz Roemheld
- Production company: Warner Bros. Pictures
- Distributed by: Warner Bros. Pictures
- Release date: May 1, 1937
- Running time: 60 minutes
- Country: United States
- Language: English

Melody for Two is a 1937 American musical film directed by Louis King and starring James Melton, Patricia Ellis and Marie Wilson.

The film is notable for introducing the song "September in the Rain", which subsequently became a pop standard. The film's art direction was by Esdras Hartley.

== Cast ==
- James Melton as Tod Weaver
- Patricia Ellis as Gale Starr
- Marie Wilson as Camille Casey
- Fred Keating as 'Remorse' Rumson
- Dick Purcell as Mel Lynch
- Wini Shaw as Lorna Wray
- Charley Foy as 'Scoop' Trotter
- Craig Reynolds as William 'Bill' Hallam
- Bill Elliott as Walter Wilson
- Eddie 'Rochester' Anderson as Exodus Johnson
- Eddie Kane as Alex Montrose
- Gordon Hart as Mr. Woodruff
- Harry Hayden as Mr. Armstrong
- Billy O'Connor as Specialty Act
- Donald O'Connor as Specialty Act
- Jack O'Connor as Specialty Act
- Glen Cavender as Green Hill Waiter
- William B. Davidson as Mr. Hale
- Sayre Dearing as Nightclub Extra
- Ralph Dunn as Radio Station Official
- Dick French as Nightclub Patron
- Eddie Graham as Nightclub Patron
- Jeanne Hart as Hard-Boiled Girl
- Stuart Holmes as Green Hill Headwaiter
- Shirley Lloyd as Carlson's Secretary
- Carlyle Moore Jr. as Announcer
- Ferdinand Munier as Mr. Klepper
- Henry Norton as Nightclub Dance Extra
- Spec O'Donnell as Page
- Robert Paige as Mr. Carlson
- Paul Panzer as Green Hill Patron
- John J. Richardson as Green Hill Patron
- Cyril Ring as Nightclub Table Extra
- Cliff Saum as Cigar Salesman
- Joseph Watson as Man
- Marjorie Weaver as Switchboard Operator
- Jack Wise as Nightclub Patron

== Reception ==
=== Critical response ===
Frank S. Nugent of The New York Times writes in his review: "Whipping itself into a fine orchestral frenzy, Melody for Two (at the Palace) posts tenor James Melton behind one swing band and alto Patricia Ellis behind another. As friendly enemies in the night clubs and over the airways they are prepared to fight it out, even if it takes all Summer. Mr. Melton has a pleasant voice for a few pleasant Warren and Dubin tunes and Miss Ellis and Wini Shaw handle their vocal stints easily. But nothing much ever happens—certainly nothing you can't afford to miss. Would it surprise you very much if we whispered that the rival bands and band leaders ultimately appear on twin stages for Delight cigarettes? We thought not. . . . The other half of the double bill is Café Metropole."
