= Young Widow =

1946 film by Edwin L. Marin

- Theatrical release poster
- Directed by: Edwin L. Marin
- Screenplay by: Richard Macaulay
- Based on: Young Widow; 1942 novel by Clarissa Fairchild Cushman
- Produced by: Hunt Stromberg
- Starring: Jane Russell; Louis Hayward; Faith Domergue; Kent Taylor; Marie Wilson; Connie Gilchrist; Penny Singleton
- Cinematography: Lee Garmes
- Edited by: John M. Foley
- Music by: Carmen Dragon
- Production company: Hunt Stromberg Productions
- Distributed by: United Artists
- Release date: March 1, 1946
- Running time: 100 minutes
- Country: United States
- Language: English
- Box office: $1.5 million

Young Widow is a 1946 drama film directed by Edwin L. Marin and starring Jane Russell and Louis Hayward. It focuses on Joan Kenwood, a young journalist who cannot get over her husband's death in World War II. Kenwood is reminded in large ways and small of her late husband during every one of her assignments. With The Outlaw still being withheld from general release, Young Widow was Jane Russell's debut.

== Plot ==
During World War II, journalist Joan Kenwood, whose Air Corps photographer husband was killed on an air mission, returns to New York City from England. The managing editor of the newspaper for which she worked, Peter Waring, offers Joan work, but she despondently rejects it and instead stays with two aunts on their farm in Virginia. Unable to stop thinking about the death, however, she decides to return to New York.

On the train, young bomber pilot Lt. Jim Cameron persistently tries to charm her, but Joan rebuffs him. In New York, both are unable to find vacant hotel rooms, but Joan calls her friend, Peg Martin, whose baseball-playing husband is serving on a submarine, for a place to stay. Peg shares her apartment with Mac, a show girl who has just returned from entertaining the troops. A number of military men drop in on the apartment as Joan arrives, all invited by the scatter-brained Mac. Jim learns where Joan is staying, shows up, too, and sees opportunity in the situation. Later, everyone goes out to a café. While Jim and Joan are dancing, her husband’s favorite song is played, and a distraught Joan leaves. Jim follows and takes her home. When he bluntly suggests that she get over the man she is in love with, Joan explains that the man is her husband, who was killed over Berlin. Ashamed, Jim returns to his base at Mitchel Field on Long Island, where he is awaiting orders for the Pacific.

The next day, as Joan is leaving the apartment, she encounters a remorseful Jim. After she accepts his apology, Jim accompanies her to the subway. While waiting for the train, Jim saves the life of an elderly woman who falls on the tracks. Joan's reporter instincts take over, and she investigates the story and offers it to the paper. Delighted, Peter promptly puts her on the payroll. Jim and she pursue an easy-going courtship when he receives a 72-hour pass.

Jim receives a telegram ordering him to report for cholera shots. He proposes to Joan, but still haunted by her husband, she rejects him, saying, "it will always be this way." A few days later, Peg's husband returns after losing his leg in combat, and moved by seeing them together, Joan decides to tell Jim that she will wait for him. Peter drives her to the airfield, but Jim's outfit is already taking off. She waves frantically at him from outside the gate as he takes off, and as he passes by, mouths the words that she loves him and will wait for him.

== Cast ==
- Jane Russell as Joan Kenwood
- Louis Hayward as Lt. Jim Cameron
- Faith Domergue as Gerry Taylor
- Marie Wilson as 'Mac' McCallister
- Kent Taylor as Peter Waring
- Penny Singleton as Peg Martin
- Connie Gilchrist as Aunt Cissie
- Cora Witherspoon as Aunt Emeline
- Norman Lloyd as Sammy Jackson
- Steve Brodie as Willie Murphy
- Richard Bailey as Bill Martin
- Robert Holton as Bob Johnson
- Peter Garey as Navy Lieutenant Smith
- Bill Moss as Marine Lieutenant Pearson (as William Moss)
- William Murphy as Army Lieutenant Hope (as Bill 'Red' Murphy)

== Production ==
The film was originally directed by William Dieterle who left after filming began. He was replaced by Andre de Toth who then left reportedly due to a case of strep throat. He was replaced in turn by Edwin L. Marin.

Despite common belief that "Young Widow" was a flop at the box office it actually did respectable business. According to Variety, "Young Widow just about broke even at $1,500,00 in domestic rentals." The filming of the production went over budget by $600,000, thus failing to make a profit.

== Release ==
Young Widow was released March 1, 1946.
