= Mr. Hobbs Takes a Vacation =

1962 film by Henry Koster

- Original cinema poster
- Directed by: Henry Koster
- Screenplay by: Nunnally Johnson
- Based on: Mr. Hobbs' Vacation; 1954 novel by Edward Streeter
- Produced by: Marvin A. Gluck; Jerry Wald
- Starring: James Stewart; Maureen O'Hara; Fabian; John Saxon; Marie Wilson; Reginald Gardiner
- Cinematography: William C. Mellor
- Edited by: Marjorie Fowler
- Music by: Henry Mancini
- Color process: DeLuxe Color
- Distributed by: 20th Century Fox
- Release dates: May 25, 1962 (Los Angeles, Chicago); June 15, 1962 (New York City, St. Louis, Omaha)
- Running time: 116 minutes
- Country: United States
- Language: English
- Budget: $2,000,000 or $3 million
- Box office: $4 million (US/Canada rentals)

Mr. Hobbs Takes a Vacation is a 1962 American comedy film directed by Henry Koster and starring James Stewart and Maureen O'Hara. The film is based on the novel Mr. Hobbs' Vacation, by Edward Streeter and features Fabian, John Saxon, Marie Wilson and Reginald Gardiner.

== Plot ==
Roger Hobbs is an overworked banker who reflects on his recent vacation. Originally, he and his wife Peggy were to travel overseas alone together, but Peggy instead arranges a seaside holiday, which includes their two grown daughters Susan and Janie, teenage daughter Katey, teenage son Danny, family cook Brenda, sons-in-law Stan Carver and Byron Grant, and three young grandchildren Peter, Peewee and Junior.

When Roger and Peggy reach their vacation destination, they find a dilapidated beach house with rotting steps. The shared telephone line and unreliable plumbing are running gags throughout the film.

Complications mount. Their youngest child and only son Danny only wants to watch television. Katey, embarrassed by a new set of dental braces, refuses to engage in any activities inside or outside the beach house. Meanwhile, their grandson wants nothing to do with Roger.

Furthermore, one of his sons-in-law, Stan, is unemployed, which is causing tension in his marriage to Susan. Their children are undisciplined, as Susan does not believe in saying no to them. Janie is married to Byron, a windbag college professor who has a lot of ideas on psychology.

While Peggy is quite worried about the state of the family, Roger argues that the children must learn to handle problems themselves, and that he and Peggy need to stay at arm's length.

Despite this, Roger quietly goes about trying to solve each problem, one by one. He manages to convince Katey to go to a local teen dance, where she insists on sitting on the sidelines with her mouth clenched shut. Roger bribes a handsome young man named Joe to pay attention to her; Joe genuinely falls for Katey and returns the money. After the television breaks, Roger agrees to take Danny on a boating trip, where they get lost in fog for a while but bond as father and son. Byron shows interest in an attractive neighbor, but Roger tells him that she is a paranoid schizophrenic, effectively keeping him from a full-fledged affair with her.

Son-in-law Stan has a shot at a good job, and Susan asks Roger and Peggy to entertain the potential employer and his wife for a few days. The couple present as prim, proper, and sober; the only interest the man has is bird-watching, and Roger endures a boring jaunt with him, but they are not what they seem to be. Chaos ensues in a madcap scene involving a hot shower and a broken door lock.

In the end, all these interpersonal crises are resolved and the family is sad to leave. Even the grumpy grandson is upset to leave his grandfather.

They book the beach house for the next summer.

== Cast ==
- James Stewart as Roger Hobbs
- Maureen O'Hara as Peggy Hobbs, Roger's wife
- Fabian as Joe Carmody
- Lauri Peters as Katey Hobbs, Roger & Peggy's third daughter
- Lili Gentle as Janie Hobbs-Grant, Roger & Peggy's second daughter and Junior's mother
- John Saxon as Byron Grant, Janie's husband and Junior's father
- John McGiver as Martin Turner
- Marie Wilson as Emily Turner, Martin's wife
- Reginald Gardiner as Reggie McHugh
- Valerie Varda as Marika Carter
- Natalie Trundy as Susan Hobbs-Carver, Roger & Peggy's first daughter and Peter & Peewee's mother
- Josh Peine as Stan Carver, Susan's husband and Peter & Peewee's father
- Michael Burns as Danny Hobbs, Roger & Peggy's son
- Minerva Urecal as Brenda, the Hobbs' cook
- Peter Oliphant as Peter Carver, Susan & Stan's son
- Richard Collier as the plumber, Mr. Saltonstall

== Production ==
Nunnally Johnson wrote the screenplay for Mr. Hobbs Takes a Vacation based on Edward Streeter's novel, Mr. Hobbs' Vacation. Streeter had previously written the novel Father of the Bride, which was filmed in 1950 and remade in 1991.

Johnson had just finished directing a series of films, and wanted to focus on writing. He agreed to do Hobbs because he liked the story "and I knew something about it."

Mr. Hobbs Takes a Vacation was filmed in California at Laguna Beach and Dana Point. The film was shot using CinemaScope wide-screen formatting, with color by DeLuxe. It marked the first time James Stewart and Maureen O'Hara starred together in a film. They co-starred again in the 1966 Western The Rare Breed. During the scene in which Mr. Hobbs escorts his daughter Katey to a dance at the yacht club, Herb Alpert is the trumpet player in the band.

The movie was the first of two James Stewart made with Fabian, the second was Dear Brigitte (1965). "If anybody’s ever blessed, you have to be blessed to work with Jimmy Stewart," recalled Fabian. "He was the most congenial, helpful person I ever worked with."

It was a rare comedy role for John Saxon.

== Reception ==
The film was relatively successful in the United States and Canada upon its release on June 15, 1962, earning $4 million with an estimated budget of $2 million, but found even greater success when released overseas.

James Stewart won the Silver Bear for Best Actor at the 12th Berlin International Film Festival for his performance, and director Henry Koster was nominated for Best Director. Stewart was nominated for a Golden Globe as Best Actor in a Musical/Comedy. The screenplay by Nunnally Johnson was nominated for Best Written Comedy by the Writers Guild of America. Stewart and Maureen O'Hara were also nominated for their performances by the Laurel Awards.

Mr. Hobbs Takes a Vacation's success inspired a series of light-hearted family comedies written by Johnson. Two of these also starred Stewart and were directed by Koster: Take Her, She's Mine (1963) and Dear Brigitte (1965).

This was the final feature film for actress Marie Wilson.

=== Critical reaction ===
Prior to the film's release, columnist Hedda Hopper wrote to her readers about it, saying:

Dear Dad: It's vacation time, but before you take your wife and brood on yours, run—don't walk—and see Jimmy Stewart in "Mr. Hobbs Takes a Vacation." You will enjoy yours a thousand times more. It's hilarious!

The film, upon its release, received generally positive reviews, although most were not as enthusiastic as Hopper's.

Variety called it "a fun picture with enough going for it on the plus side of the ledger to make it a promising boxoffice candidate for 20th-Fox, although it misfires, chiefly in the situation development department."

Bosley Crowther of The New York Times wrote in his review: "Right off the bat, it is suggested in this wacky domestic report that togetherness is strictly for the birds and that sensible parents, especially elders, should write it out of their books. The Mr. Hobbs of the title, played beguilingly by James Stewart, is very much of this opinion as far as his own brood is concerned."

Wanda Hale of the New York Daily News gave the film a full four-star rating, calling it "a crackerjack comedy. By all means hurry to the Paramount Theatre and laugh yourself weak at this take-off on family togetherness on a holiday at the seashore that stars James Stewart in one of his funniest roles. Jerry Wald's comedy for 20th Century-Fox is more amusing than 'Mr. Hulot's Holiday' because of the dialogue—droll, clever, fresh lines written by one of the keenest wits in films, Nunnally Johnson. 'Mr. Hobbs' is not one of those slick comedies about people we seldom meet. It's a comedy of identity, the characters are those we know intimately, even ourselves."

Philip K. Scheuer wrote in the Los Angeles Times:

Twentieth Century-Fox has, for a change, what looks .like a box-office winner... Nunnally is a humorist in whom the milk of human kindness has soured, and some of this seeps through the script and tastes unwontedly bitter. At the other extreme, he has squirted the text with occasional witticisms that are funny in themselves but seem out of the context. Neither characteristic is calculated to lessen the over-all enjoyment of the paying customer.

Myles Standish wrote in the St. Louis Post-Dispatch:

ONE WOULD SUPPOSE it is about time the modern American fetish of togetherness gets a gentle ribbing, and just that is given it in "MR. HOBBS TAKES A VACATION," an amusing domestic comedy at the FOX THEATER.

[...] The film is loaded with chuckles, and Mr. Stewart does a marvelous job of character humor all the ridiculous developments are there, but he still keeps them realistic. The funniest sequence is one in which that deft comedian, John McGiver, and Marie Wilson as his wife, visit the Hobbs and have to be kowtowed to in spite of his grumpiness and the hopeless stuffiness of both, because it is hoped he will give a son-in-law a job. The climax, when Hobbs gets locked in the bathroom with the visiting wife when he tries to turn off the steam, is hilarious. Miss O'Hara, still as beautiful as ever, is quite a grandmother.

Others in the cast, like John Saxon, Natalie Trundy and Fabian, mostly play straight. It is Stewart who carries the comedy. It is a treat to hear him growl at a brat grandson (raised by modern psychological methods)—"Little creep."

The St. Louis Globe-Democrat called it "a bright little comedy". A user of the Mae Tinee pseudonym in the Chicago Tribune said that "some of the resulting problems are genuinely funny, others rather strained. Some of the characters are obviously dragged in for box office appeal, but Lauri Peters, who is afflicted with braces and the horrors of being a wall flower at the same time, is appealing. James Stewart is likable in the lead, but Maureen O'Hara is a fairly sugary mama who looks more like a model than a woman with a large brood and a lot of problems. With a more selective script and more realistic direction, this item could have been a lot better. As is, it's never very convincing but occasionally rather amusing." Stanley Eichelbaum said in the San Francisco Examiner that "it doesn't take much ingenuity to predict almost all of the situation comedy that rains down on James Stewart in" the film, but added that "this is Wald's idea of good, clean, family fun and I suppose it is. For those who still find domestic imbroglios diverting, 1 heartily recommend this movie." Edwin Howard said in the Memphis Press-Scimitar that "unlike the plumbing, which always runs hot, the gags run mostly cold and gave me the feeling I had seen them all before, tho perhaps not all in the same movie." Frances Melrose of the Rocky Mountain News wrote that "the familiar, when it Isn't too painful, can be quite enjoyable. That's the case with 'Mr. Hobbs Takes a Vacation.'" She added that the movie Is in Technicolor, and Mr. Hobbs' vacation is more fun for everyone than it is for Mr. Hobbs." Henry T. Murdock of The Philadelphia Inquirer was among those who reviewed this film alongside the concurrent and similar Walt Disney comedy Bon Voyage!, remarking that "these two movies are variations on a theme, but the writing, acting and direction bring a refreshing quality to their gags." Boyd Martin of The Courier-Journal remarked that "despite the fact that its theme is hardly original and its situations predictable, it has enough unique moments to keep one's interest alive." Louis Cook of the Detroit Free-Press said it "is more often a study in family farapartness than togetherness, but it still has a lot of yuks for anybody who has attempted an old-fashioned family vacation, as who hasn't." Jay Carmody, a drama critic for The Evening Star of Washington, D.C., said that it "undertakes to prove that there still is mileage in the domestic farce built' around a family’s summer holiday. This is a daring adventure on the part of an old pro pack led by James Stewart and Maureen O’Hara. They bring it off rather better than might be expected but not to the extent of concealing that the theme has been exposed to a lot of time and weather. One is inclined to attribute the major merriment of this Jerry Wald production, one of his last, to one of the non-visible old pros associated with the film. This would be Scriptist Nunnally Johnson." Hope Pantell of Baltimore's Evening Sun wrote that "if the whole film were as good as its best moments, this would be a veritable gem of a spoof of togetherness. However, the proceedings do sag rather often, but considering the dearth of this sort of thing, one must be grateful for what topical, funny lines and situations are available." Marjory Adams wrote in The Boston Globe:

The new comedy at the Keith Memorial has warmth, human appeal and the charm of slick production values. It is funnier in some spots than others—but as long as the laughs come in bunches, not many people in the audience are going to scrutinize the Nunnally Johnson screen play too closely.

Denman Kountze Jr. of the Omaha World-Herald said that "the film and the actor, chosen by the State Department to represent the United States at this summer's Berlin Film Festival, united with a splendid script and admirable cast to evoke a light, bright mood that never flagged." Wendy Michener of the Toronto Daily Star said that "screenwriter Nunnally Johnson has allotted the family too many miseries for comfort", and that "for about 10 minutes—the length of an early morning bird-hunt—the comedy gets off the ground. Veteran director Henry Koster must have lost his touch. Deficient in mood inchoate in style, 'Mr. Hobbs Takes a Vacation' is a sort of stagnant 'Mr. Hulot’s Holiday'. Maureen O'Hara delivers her lines as though trying to be understood over a bad long-distance telephone connection while Valeric Varda (once Susan Vajda of Toronto) successfully recreates the siren stereotype. James Stewart frequently has good moments, but these are not enough to save the day." Michael P. Feiner of the Montreal Star wrote that "the picture is excellent when it treats the Hobbses as a caricature of a representative North American family. The first half hour of the movie takes some gentle but Intelligent satirical pokes at intra-family difficulties in general and communication troubles in particular. 'Mr. Hobbs' dips badly, however, when it gets caught up in the specific affairs of the Hobbs family. As detailed situations arise, the film deteriorates into a series of weak 'Father Knows Best' episodes which progressively become more tedious and more far-fetched. The last half of the picture could have done well with a less lenient editor." Harold Whitehead of Montreal's Gazette wrote:

If the moviemakers ever want another team like William Powell and Myrna Loy we can think of no better candidates than James Stewart and Maureen O'Hara.

Mr. Stewart has always been an accomplished performer in comedy roles and Miss O'Hara, in late years, has gathered a great deal of technique. (Anyhow she is so beautiful you can forgive her any theatrical sins. This may be a sign of advancing years but we think she is even lovelier now than she was in her first film well over 20 years ago).

Anyway this film shows the pair up as a very compatible team and we would like to see much more of them, if anyone down in Hollywood is listening.

The film itself is a sometimes frothy, sometimes touching, sometimes merely trite affair about one man and his large family, which includes his children's often brattish children, and how they all fare in a ramshackle old beach house.

The script is bright often enough to hold the attention and the characters are handsome and amiable folk (pretty rare birds in movies these days).

==== International reviews ====
In his review for London's Daily Mirror, critic Dick Richards wrote that the fact "that this lighthearted film does not become as laborious to the audience as the holiday itself does to Jimmy Stewart is almost entirely due to his deft comic skill. He wheedles every shred of fun out of some prolonged, under-nourished comedy situations. The dialogue is mostly brisk and bright and with his easy, laconic, slightly bemused charm, Stewart keeps the whole thing on a cheerful note. Lauri Peters makes a neat debut as a teenager who is shy of boys because of the new braces on her teeth. As the awkward house guests John McGuier and Marie Wilson arrive just in time to pump some fresh gaiety into the proceedings when it is very much needed." The Sunday Mirror called it "first-rate family entertainment." Paul Dehn of the Daily Herald called the film "conventional foolery—made acceptable by a witty performance from Mr. Stewart, a too brief bit of deadpan brilliance from John McGiver as a relentless birdwatcher, and an enchanting display of teenage talent from Miss Peters—with whom I could never be fed up to the teeth while she was so touchingly fed up with hers. Give her a year or two, and she will be glittering in the comic galaxy whose brightest star is Shirley MacLaine." Ernest Betts of The Sunday People said "that long. lanky Yank, Jimmie Stewart, starts a new trend in American pictures with this cheerful chunk of top-grade holiday family entertainment." Josephine O'Neill of The Sun-Herald said that "Fox's candy-coloured comedy about a night mare holiday, spent at a beach-house by a city banker and his family, is happier in its foolery than in its family sentiments. The bird-watching sequence, and the visitation by the Turner couple are both inventive and funny. The situation gags about the plumbing and the beach-blonde, about the TV-dedicated young son and luggage are, however, repeated until their amusement drains off." Colin Bennett of The Age wrote that "this Henry Koster-directed comedy, like nearly every Cinemascope comedy these days, is about half an hour too long and too slack. The expected things happen on the Hobbs's holiday, and the Hobbs's themselves, lack the true lunacy of the old Hollywood screwball family. However, Nunnally Johnson's skillful dialogue sees it through. Containing far more than the average ration of wit, it insures that most of the picture makes good, bright pleasant entertainment."
