= William Tell Overture =

Overture to the opera William Tell

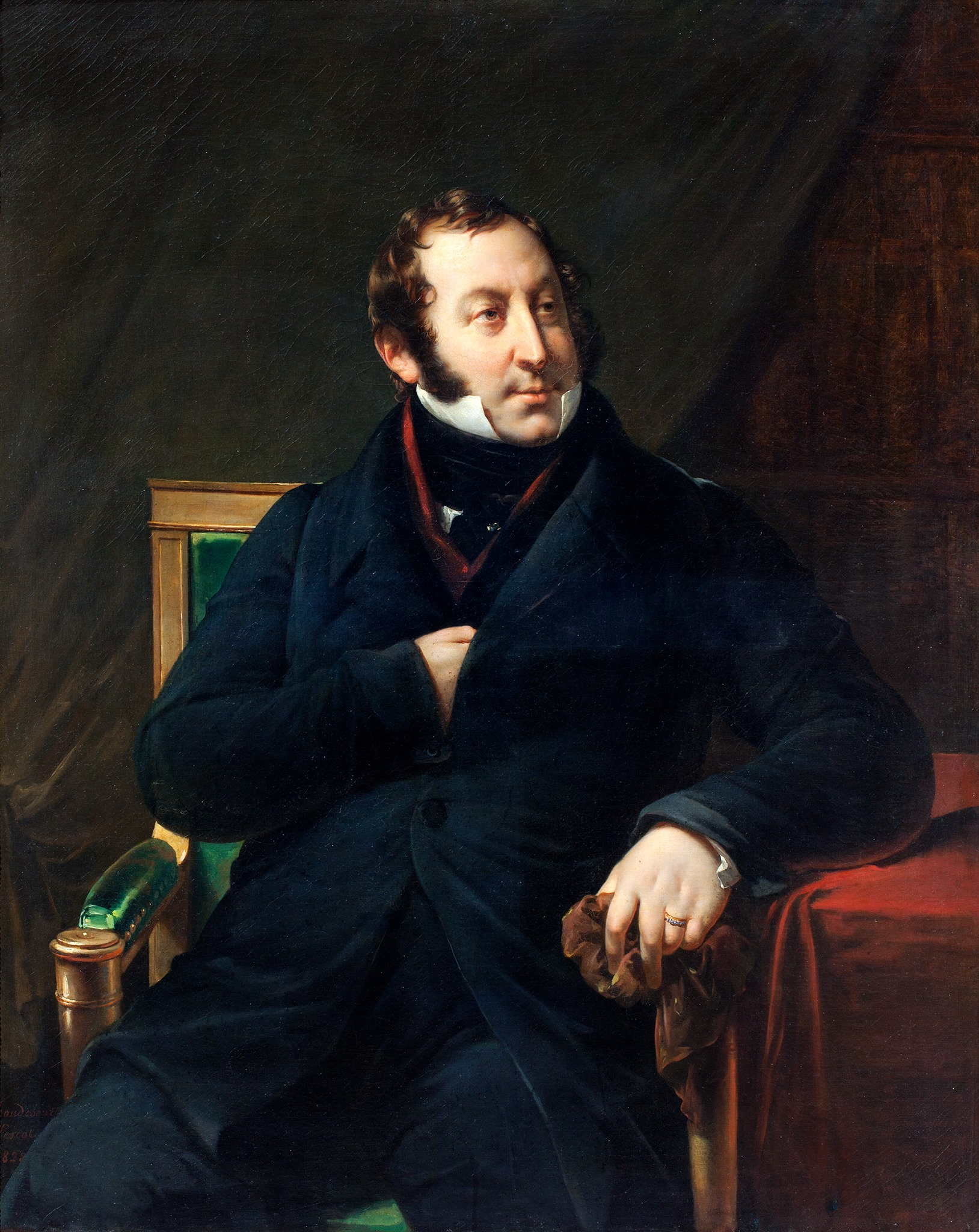
- Portrait of Gioachino Rossini, Hortense Haudebourt-Lescot (1828)
- William Tell Overture The United States Marine Band performs a wind octet transcription

The William Tell Overture is the overture to the opera William Tell (original French title Guillaume Tell), composed by Gioachino Rossini. William Tell premiered in 1829 and was the last of Rossini's 39 operas, after which he went into semi-retirement. (He continued to compose cantatas, sacred music and secular vocal music.) The overture is in four parts, each following without pause.

There has been repeated use (and sometimes parody) of parts of this overture in both classical music and popular media. The finale has been consistently used as the theme music for The Lone Ranger in radio, television and film, and has become widely associated with horseback riding since then. Two different parts were also used as theme music for the British television series The Adventures of William Tell, the fourth part (popularly identified in the US with The Lone Ranger) in the UK, and the third part, rearranged as a stirring march, in the US.

Franz Liszt prepared a piano transcription of the overture in 1838 (S.552) which became a staple of his concert repertoire. There are also transcriptions by other composers, including versions by Louis Gottschalk for two and four pianos and a duet for piano and violin.

== Instrumentation ==
The overture is scored for: a piccolo, a flute, two oboes (first or second oboe doubles a cor anglais), two clarinets in A, two bassoons, four natural horns in G and E, two trumpets in E, three trombones, timpani, triangle, bass drum and cymbals, and strings.

== Structure ==
The overture, which lasts for approximately 12 minutes, paints a musical picture of life in the Swiss Alps, the setting of the opera. It was described by Hector Berlioz, who usually loathed Rossini's works, as "a symphony in four parts". But unlike an actual symphony with its distinct movements, the overture's parts transition from one to the next without a break.

1. Prelude: Dawn

The prelude is a slow section in E major and in an A-B-A-Coda structure, scored for five solo cellos accompanied by double basses. It begins in E minor with a solo cello which is in turn 'answered' by the remaining cellos and the double basses. An impending storm is hinted at by two very quiet timpani rolls (1st on E, 2nd on B) resembling distant thunder. The section ends with a very high sustained note played by the first cello. The duration of the prelude is about three minutes.

2. Storm

This dynamic section in E minor and in an A-B-A structure, is played by the full orchestra. It begins with the violins and violas. Their phrases are punctuated by short wind instrument interventions of three notes each, first by the piccolo, flute and oboes, then by the clarinets and bassoons. The storm breaks out in full with the entrance of the French horns, trumpets, trombones, and bass drum. The volume and number of instruments gradually decreases as the storm subsides. The section ends with the flute playing alone. Part 2, Storm, also lasts for about three minutes.

3. Ranz des vaches

This pastorale section in G major and in an A-B-A-Coda form, signifying the calm after the storm, begins with a Ranz des vaches or "Call to the Cows", featuring the cor anglais (English horn). The English horn then plays in alternating phrases with the flute, culminating in a duet with the triangle accompanying them in the background. The melody appears several times in the opera, including the final act, and takes on the character of a leitmotif. Call to the Cows lasts a little more than two minutes.

This segment is often used in animated cartoons to signify daybreak or bucolic beauty, most notably in Walt Disney's The Old Mill and Marv Newland's Bambi Meets Godzilla, which uses the tune as its main musical score before Godzilla stomps on Bambi.

4. Finale: March of the Swiss Soldiers

The finale, often called the "March of the Swiss Soldiers" in English, is in E major like the prelude, but it is an ultra-dynamic galop heralded by trumpets and played by the full orchestra. It alludes to the final act, which recounts the Swiss soldiers' victorious battle to liberate their homeland from Austrian repression. The segment, in an Intro-A-B-A-Coda form, lasts for about three minutes.

Although there are no horses or cavalry charges in the opera, this segment is often used in popular media to denote galloping horses, a race, or a hero riding to the rescue. Its most famous use in that respect is as the theme music for The Lone Ranger; that usage has become so famous that some notable writers have defined an "intellectual" as "a man who can listen to the William Tell Overture without thinking of the Lone Ranger". The Finale is quoted by Johann Strauss Sr. in his William Tell Galop (Op. 29b), published and premiered a matter of months after the Paris premiere of the original, and by Dmitri Shostakovich in the first movement of his Symphony No. 15.

== Cultural references ==
Described by David Wondrich as a "frequent target of plunder by brass bands in the years during which they dominated the American musical landscape", the overture features prominently in Walt Disney's Mickey Mouse cartoon The Band Concert. It has also been used in cartoons parodying classical music (e.g. Bugs Bunny's Overtures to Disaster in which the overture's finale is performed by Daffy Duck and Porky Pig), select episodes in children’s TV series such as Thomas and Friends (at various points during its fifth, sixth and seventh seasons as part of a runaway/chase sequence) or Westerns (e.g. Bugs Bunny Rides Again). The finale has also been sung with specially written lyrics by Daffy Duck in Yankee Doodle Daffy.

One of the most frequently used pieces of classical music in American advertising, the overture (especially its finale) appears in numerous ads, with psychologist Joan Meyers-Levy suggesting that it is particularly suitable for those targeting male consumers. It was used in a hip-hop version by DJ Shadow to accompany the 2001 "Defy Convention" advertisement campaign for Reebok athletic shoes and in an electronic version for a 2008 Honda Civic campaign.

Amongst the films which feature the overture prominently is Stanley Kubrick's A Clockwork Orange, where an electronic rearrangement by Wendy Carlos of the finale is played during a fast motion orgy scene. The less frequently heard introductory portion of the overture is used as somber mood music later in the film. The piece is also used in the film The Princess Diaries (when Joe’s limo arrives to rescue Mia when she is stranded in the rain) and its sequel (when Nicholas sets out to stop Mia’s wedding on an old bicycle and later on horseback).

The late Danish-American actor, comedian and pianist Victor Borge would play the opening of the finale "upside-down" (then "right-side up") as part of his act. The overture, especially its finale, also features in several sporting events. It has been used by the Hong Kong Jockey Club for many years. The overture is often played as part of a timeout performance during Indiana University basketball games.

== See also ==
- William Tell Overture (Spike Jones song)
- William Tell Overture (Mike Oldfield instrumental)
