= My Friend Irma =

Radio comedy of the 1940s and 1950s

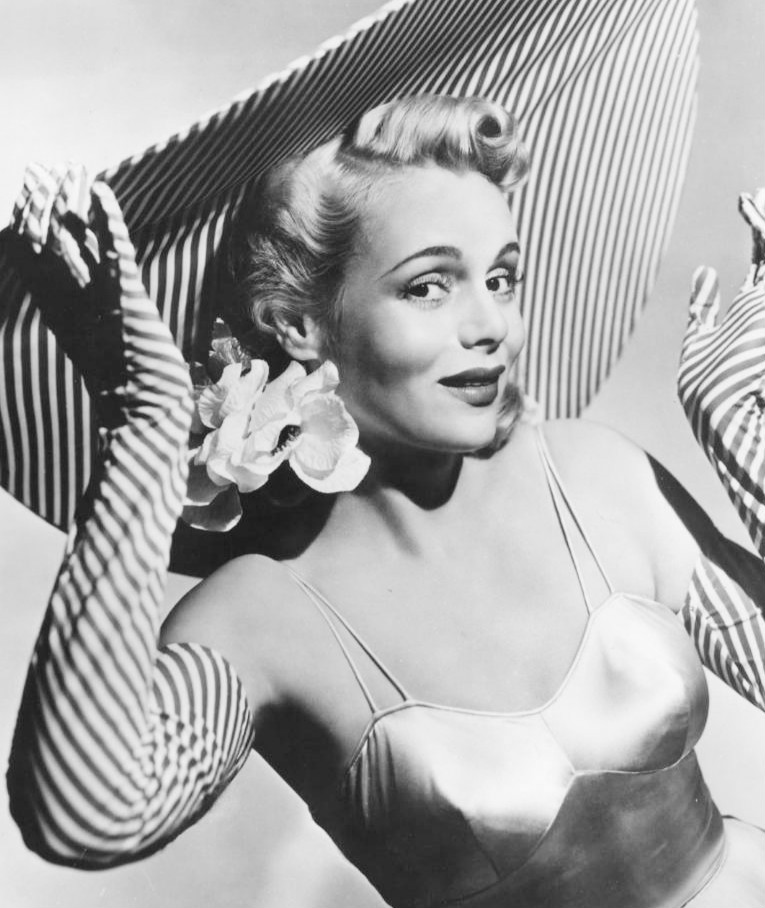
- Marie Wilson as title character Irma Peterson
- Created by: Cy Howard
- Original work: Radio, 1947

Print publications
- Comics: My Friend Irma
- Comic strip(s): My Friend Irma

Films and television
- Film(s): My Friend Irma, My Friend Irma Goes West
- Television series: My Friend Irma

Theatrical presentations
- Play(s): My Friend Irma, a Comedy in Three Acts

Audio
- Radio program(s): My Friend Irma

Jack Seidel illustrated the My Friend Irma comic strip which began September 11, 1950.

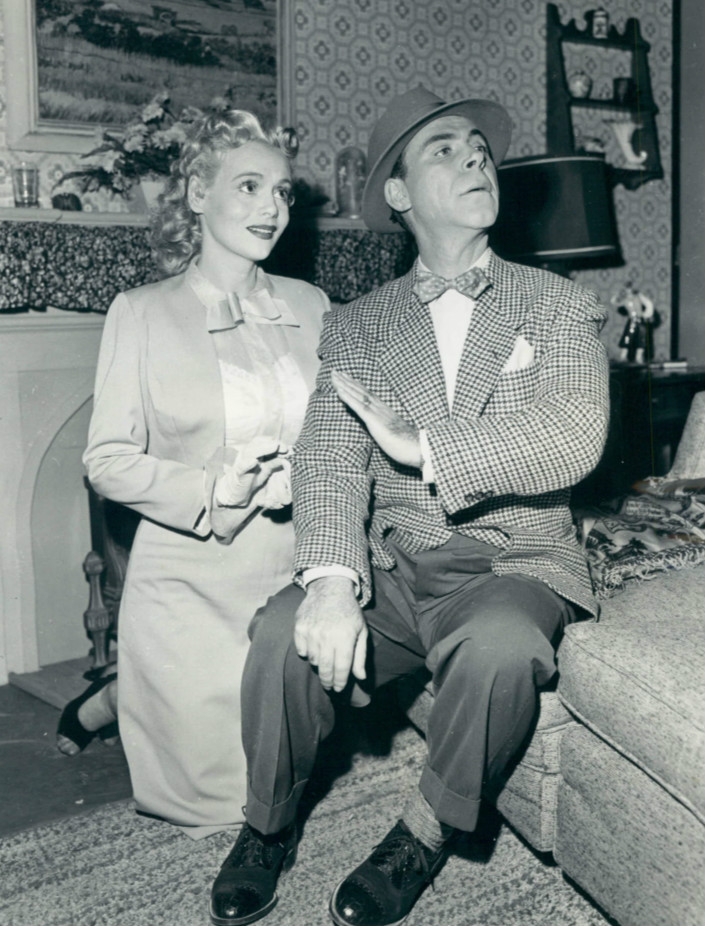
In the television version, Sid Tomack played Irma's boyfriend, Al.

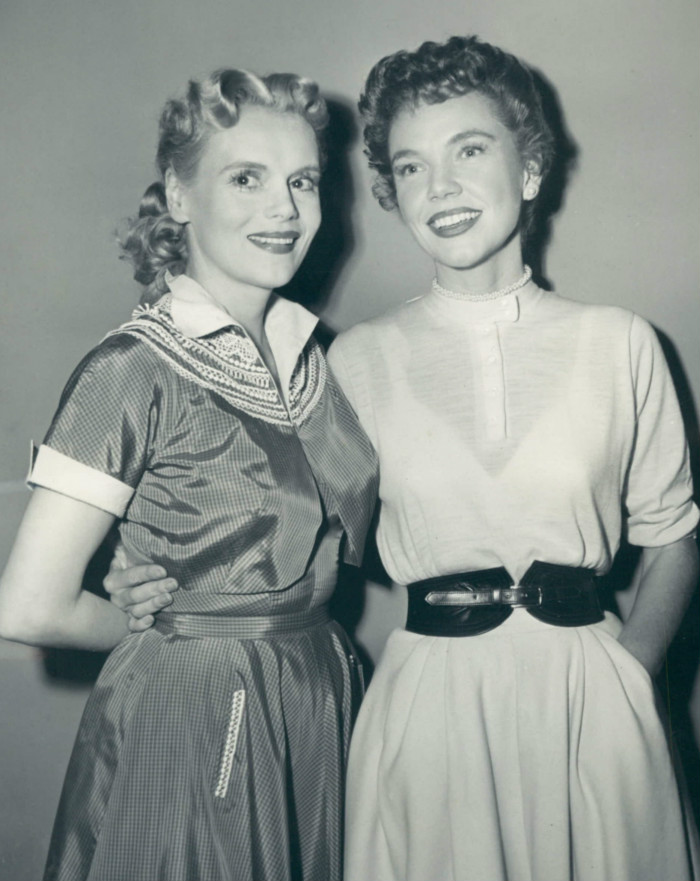
Marie Wilson and Mary Shipp as Irma's friend Kay Foster, 1953.

My Friend Irma is a media franchise that was spawned by a top-rated, long-running radio situation comedy created by writer-director-producer Cy Howard. The radio show was so popular in the late 1940s that its success escalated the films, television, a comic strip and a comic book that comprise the franchise. Marie Wilson portrayed the title character Irma Peterson on radio, in two films and the television series. The radio series was broadcast on CBS from April 11, 1947, to August 23, 1954.

== Characters and story ==
Dependable, level-headed Jane Stacy (Cathy Lewis—plus Joan Banks during Lewis' illness in early 1949 and Mary Shipp later) began each weekly radio program by narrating a misadventure of her innocent, bewildered roommate Irma, a scatterbrained stenographer from Minnesota. The two central characters were in their mid-20s. Irma had her 25th birthday in one episode; she was born on May 5. After the two met in the first episode, they lived together in an apartment rented from their Irish landlady Mrs. O'Reilly (Jane Morgan, Gloria Gordon).

Irma's boyfriend Al (John Brown) was a deadbeat, barely on the right side of the law, who had not held a job in years. Only someone like Irma could love Al, whose nickname for Irma was "Chicken". Al had many crazy get-rich-quick schemes that never worked. Al planned to marry Irma at some future date so she could support him. Professor Kropotkin (Hans Conried), the Russian violinist at the Princess Burlesque theater, lived upstairs. He greeted Jane and Irma with remarks like "My two little bunnies with one being an Easter bunny and the other being Bugs Bunny." The Professor insulted Mrs. O'Reilly, complained about his room, and reluctantly became O'Reilly's love interest in an effort to make her forget his back rent. In 1953, Conried left the program and was replaced by Kenny Delmar as his cousin Maestro Wanderkin.

Irma worked for the lawyer Mr. Clyde (Alan Reed). She had such an odd filing system that once when Clyde fired her, he had to hire her back again because he couldn't find anything. Useless at dictation, Irma mangled whatever Clyde dictated. Asked how long she had been with Clyde, Irma said, "When I first went to work with him he had curly black hair, then it got grey, and now it's snow white. I guess I've been with him about six months."

Irma became less intelligent and even more ditzy as the program evolved. She also developed a tendency to whine or cry whenever something went wrong, which was usually at least once every episode. Jane had a romantic inclination for her boss, millionaire Richard Rhinelander III (Leif Erickson). Another actor in the show was Bea Benaderet.

== Sponsors ==
The show was sponsored by Swan Soap, and Irma would usually make a silly remark about it so the name could be advertised. Frank Bingman was the announcer for Swan Soap. The program also was sponsored by ENNDS which got rid of breath and body odors and each tiny capsule was said to contain 100 mg (1.5 gr) of chlorophyll. Pepsodent was also a sponsor.

Because of the popularity of the show (early in the series, shows 41–43), a contest was run for the services of Irma/Marie Wilson to act as a secretary for the highest bidder for one day, with her willing to travel anywhere in the U.S. The money was to go to the March of Dimes charity to fight polio. Three businessmen bid $1,000, but the winner was the Coca-Cola Bottling Company of Fort Worth, Texas which bid $5,000.

== Lawsuit ==
In 1946, writer Arthur Kurlan had worked with CBS Radio in an attempt to bring the premise and characters of the popular play and film My Sister Eileen to radio. Soon after this effort failed, the very similar My Friend Irma was created. Kurlan took legal action, and ultimately received a settlement from CBS.

== Films and television ==
The TV version, seen on CBS from January 8, 1952, until June 1954, was the first series telecast from the CBS Television City facility in Hollywood in October 1952.

The film My Friend Irma (1949) starred Marie Wilson and Diana Lynn, but is mainly remembered today for introducing Dean Martin and Jerry Lewis to moviegoers, resulting in more screen time for Martin and Lewis in the sequel My Friend Irma Goes West (1950).

== Comic strip and comic book ==
The My Friend Irma comic strip, illustrated by Jack Seidel, began syndication with the Mirror Enterprises Syndicate on September 11, 1950, receiving a promotional boost in the November 7, 1950 issue of Look. In 1951, Dan DeCarlo took over the strip with Stan Lee scripting.

Atlas Comics (Marvel) published the My Friend Irma comic book which ran from #3 to #48 (1950 to 1955), and was most often written by Stan Lee with art by Dan DeCarlo. After Atlas stopped publishing My Friend Irma, DeCarlo and Lee created a similar feature for Atlas titled My Girl Pearl.
