= Clem McCarthy =

American sportscaster and public address announcer

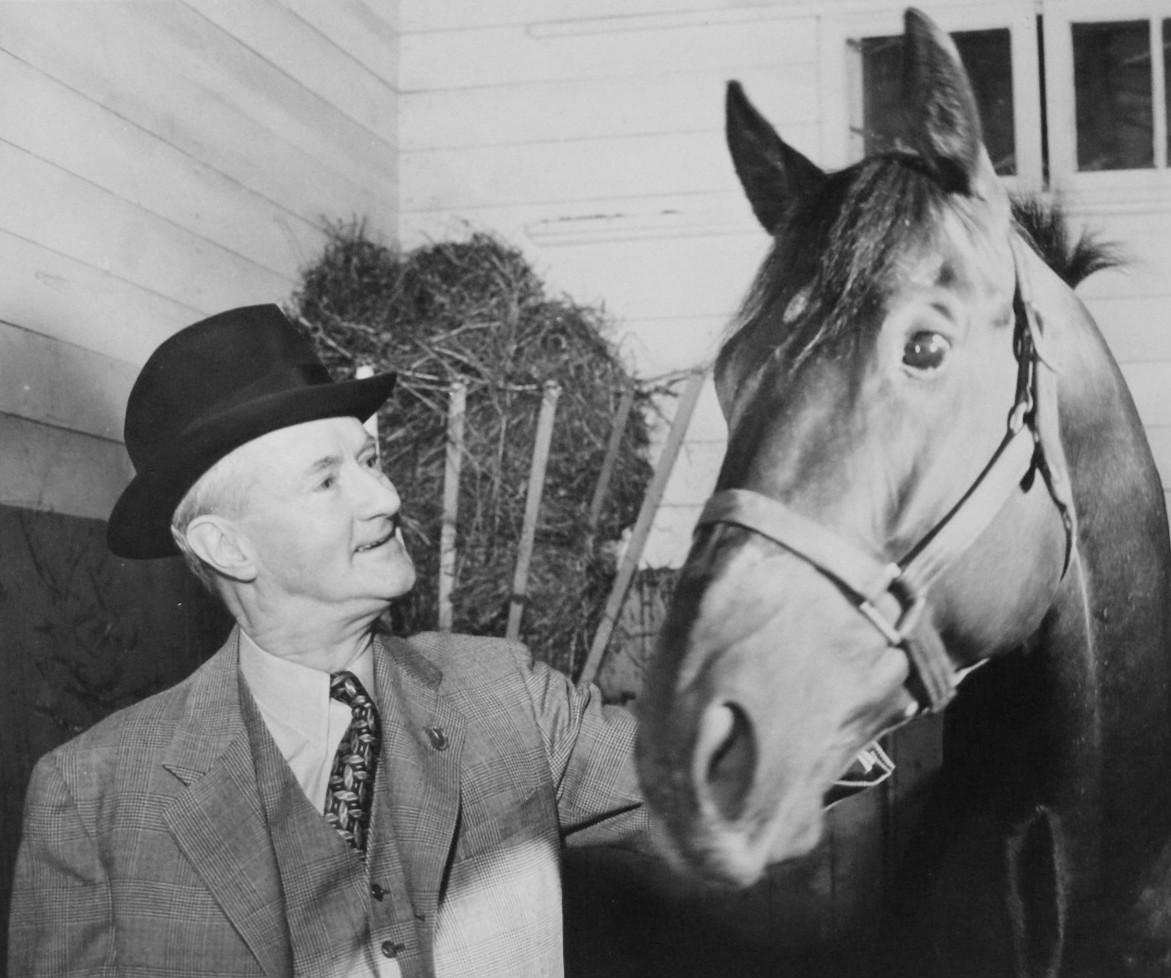
- McCarthy in 1948.
- Born: September 9, 1882; Rochester, New York
- Died: June 4, 1962 (aged 79); New York City, New York
- Occupation: Radio Announcer

Charles Louis "Clem" McCarthy (September 9, 1882 – June 4, 1962) was an American sportscaster and public address announcer. He also narrated Pathe News's RKO newsreels. He was known for his gravelly voice and dramatic style, a "whiskey tenor" as sports announcer and executive David J. Halberstam has called it.

== Early years ==
McCarthy was born in East Bloomfield, New York. His father was a dealer and auctioneer of horses, and with him the young McCarthy often went to horse fairs and race tracks across the United States. Although he wanted to be a jockey, he grew too big and instead began reporting on horse writing in Southern California in the 1920s.

== Career ==
As noted in Halberstam's book Sports on New York Radio, McCarthy is considered one of horse racing's great callers, paving the way for later well-known announcers from Cawood Ledford to Dave Johnson. He was the first public-address announcer at a major American racetrack, Arlington Park in Arlington Heights, Illinois, where a public address system was installed in 1927.

As well as calling races at racetracks and for NBC Radio, he was a top boxing announcer. His most often replayed boxing sportscast is probably his NBC radio call of the 1938 Joe Louis-Max Schmeling rematch at Yankee Stadium:

Louis, right and left to the head, a left to the jaw, a right to the head, and [referee Art] Donovan is watching carefully. Louis measures him. Right to the body, a left up to the jaw, and Schmeling is down! The count is five! Five, six, seven, eight -- the men are in the ring! The fight is over, on a technical knock out. Max Schmeling is beaten in one round!

Later that year he called the famous match race between Seabiscuit and War Admiral, including this phrase in the final stretch run, as Seabiscuit shocked the horse racing world by outrunning the heavily favored War Admiral: “Seabiscuit by three! Seabiscuit by three! Seabiscuit is the winner by four lengths!”

McCarthy is also known for miscalling the 1947 Preakness Stakes when a crowd standing on a platform blocked his view of the far turn, just as two horses with similar silks switched places. (Chic Anderson, another great track announcer, made a similar mistake in the 1975 Kentucky Derby.) As with Anderson later, McCarthy's quick and humble admission of the mistake helped the criticism blow over. Years after McCarthy's death, sports film-maker Bud Greenspan compared the audio of the race call with newsreel film of the race, and discovered that McCarthy had stated "and the crowd blocks me for a moment" at the exact point where the two horses had switched places.

McCarthy's career also included work at local radio stations, beginning at KYW in Chicago in 1928. From there, he went to WMCA in New York City.

== Personal life ==
In 1929, McCarthy married vaudeville actress Vina Smith. They had no children, and they remained married until her death in 1954. He suffered serious injury in an automobile accident in 1957, and in his final years he had Parkinson's disease.

== Recognition ==
The National Sportscasters and Sportswriters Association inducted McCarthy into its Hall of Fame in 1970. In 1987, McCarthy was inducted into the American Sportscasters Association Hall of Fame along with veteran ABC Sports announcer Jim McKay.

A long-playing record, Clem McCarthy, the Voice of American Sports, was produced in 1962.

== In popular culture ==
Comedian Doodles Weaver mimicked McCarthy on Spike Jones's 1948 novelty recording of the "William Tell Overture".
