= Mary Shipp =

American actress (1915–1997)

Mary Shipp (September 17, 1915 – May 8, 1997) was an American actress who performed primarily on radio and television. She portrayed "everything from giddy teenagers to siren-voiced vixens and stuffy matrons".

== Early years ==
Shipp was born on September 17, 1915, in Los Angeles. She studied ballet as a child, and her professional debut came in a stock theater production of The Little Princess when she was 8 years old. Her early education came at Immaculate Heart Convent and Hollywood High School, and she majored in dramatics at Los Angeles City College, where her acting won awards. Actress Jeanne Eagels was Shipp's aunt. Shipp gained early acting experience with the Beverly Hills Community Players.

== Career ==
Shipp's radio career began when she portrayed Becky Thatcher on The Adventures of Tom Sawyer soon after she finished college. She portrayed Henry Aldrich's girlfriend, Kathleen, on The Aldrich Family concurrently with playing Milton Berle's wife on his program. She followed those roles by taking the part of Miss Spalding, a teacher of English in a night school class of immigrants, on The Great Gildersleeve. She portrayed Linda on My Best Girls. Other radio programs on which Shipp performed included Cavalcade of America, Silver Theater, My True Story, Manhattan at Midnight, and Appointment with Life.

Shipp continued to play Miss Spalding in the television adaptation of Life with Luigi. In 1953 she joined the cast of the TV version of My Friend Irma, portraying Kay Foster, a new roommate for Irma. Other TV programs on which she appeared included You Are There, Dick Powell's Zane Grey Theatre, The Donna Reed Show, Perry Mason, Dangerous Assignment, Crown Theatre with Gloria Swanson, and The O. Henry Playhouse.

Shipp acted in the 1953 film Jennifer, and she wrote occasionally, including four scripts that she sold for the Kate Smith Speaks radio program.

== Personal life ==
Shipp married producer Harry Ackerman in Los Angeles on August 16, 1939. They had a daughter and a son. She died 8 May 1997 in Los Angeles, CA.
