= Kenyon Nicholson =

American playwright and screenwriter

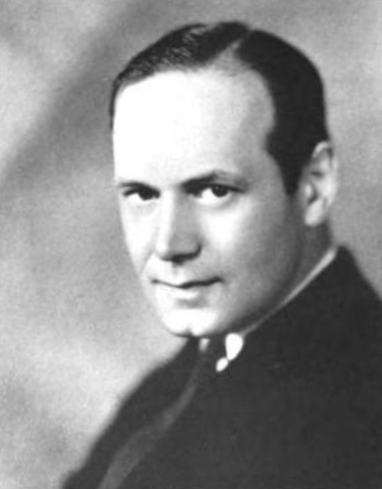
- Born: John Kenyon Nicholson; May 21, 1894; Crawfordsville, Indiana, U.S.
- Died: December 19, 1986 (aged 92); Trenton, New Jersey, U.S.
- Other name: John Kenyon Nicholson
- Occupations: Playwright, screenwriter
- Spouse: Lucile Nikolas (m. 1924; died 1978)

John Kenyon Nicholson (May 21, 1894 – December 19, 1986) was an American playwright and screenwriter.

== Early life ==
John Kenyon Nicholson was born in Crawfordsville, Indiana, on May 21, 1894, the oldest son of Thomas B. and Anne (Kenyon) Nicholson. Thomas and Anne had one other child, Thomas Laurence, born May 11, 1896.

== Education ==
Kenyon attended Crawfordsville High School from 1909 to 1910, where he was active in drama and was the assistant business manager of the yearbook, The Athenian. On September 1, 1911, Kenyon enrolled at DeWitt Clinton High School in New York City. He stayed there for a year, living with his aunt Bessie (Nicholson) Wheeler at 61 Hamilton Place. At DeWitt Clinton he studied English, Latin, German, physical training, history, and elocution, and belonged to the chorus in a school play. While in New York, Kenyon spent his free time at the Knickerbocker Theatre, Casino Theatre, and New Amsterdam Theatre on Broadway. He returned to Crawfordsville for his senior year and graduated from Crawfordsville High School in 1913.

Kenyon then attended Wabash College in Crawfordsville. His first theatrical hit was at Wabash in 1913. The play was called Let Him Up, Doc; it was a one-act "satirical, musical treatment" composed by Nicholson and N. E. Tannenbaum. As a member of the Dramatic Club, Kenyon wrote and produced plays throughout his college career.

In addition to theater, Kenyon was on the staff of the school newspaper, The Bachelor, as well as various committees, including the one in 1914 that decided on white v-neck jerseys with purple edging as the sophomore class insignia. In 1915 Kenyon won the Gene Stratton-Porter short story prize for his story, "Puppets". He was awarded by Ms. Stratton-Porter $100. He was on the board of the school magazine, a member of Beta Theta Pi, and was appointed director of the glee club in 1917; he was a second tenor and was in the ukulele quintet.

== Military career ==
Kenyon and his brother, Laurence, enlisted in the Army in April, 1917, and were sent to Officers' Reserve Training camp at Fort Benjamin Harrison in Lawrence, Indiana. He was commissioned as a first lieutenant and was stationed in France as an intelligence officer with the 1st Army headquarters. Kenyon had been in France for a couple of months when he had a chance meeting with Laurence, who had just arrived there with another unit. After the Armistice, Kenyon continued his education at Cambridge University before he returned home to Indiana.

During World War II, Kenyon Nicholson was an American Red Cross special representative in Australia.

== Career ==
Kenyon began his post-war career as a press agent with the Stuart Walker Company in both New York and Indianapolis. While in Indianapolis, his first full-length play was produced at the Murat Theater. Honor Bright was a comedy written in collaboration with the writer Meredith Nicholson, his father's first cousin. Kenyon was next appointed as an instructor in the English department at Columbia University, and was assistant to Hatcher Hughes in teaching playwriting.

Kenyon Nicholson's first Broadway success was The Barker, which was produced by Charles L. Wagner and Edgar Selwyn at the Biltmore Theater in January, 1927. Walter Huston played the lead, Nifty Miller, the manager of a traveling tent show who is surprised when his son quits school to join the show. Claudette Colbert played the part of Lou, a snake charmer who falls for Nifty's son. Nicholson adapted The Barker into a novel, published in 1927.

His next big playwriting success was Torch Song, produced by Arthur Hopkins at the Plymouth Theater in 1930. This play centered around a traveling salesman who deserts his cabaret singer girlfriend to marry his employer's daughter.

Sailor, Beware! was Kenyon's last real success on Broadway; it opened at the Lyceum Theater on September 28, 1933. The idea for this play came to Kenyon and his writing partner, Charles Robinson while they were drinking in a sailor's hangout in San Pedro. The play is set in Panama. The film rights for Sailor, Beware! were sold to Paramount for $76,500. The movie, released in 1952, starred Dean Martin and Jerry Lewis.

Kenyon collaborated on many of his plays; some of his writing partners include S. N. Behrman, Charles Knox Robinson, and John Golden. In addition to playwriting, Kenyon wrote for radio, Columbia Pictures, and Metro-Goldwyn-Mayer. He also edited numerous collections of short plays.

== Personal life ==
Lucile Nikolas was a member of the Stuart Walker Company in Indianapolis in 1921 when Kenyon Nicholson, press agent, met her. They were married on Christmas Eve, 1924, at her parents' house near Pittsburgh, Pennsylvania. Lucile acted in theater, film, and radio. She appeared in the 1931 film Stolen Heaven, directed by George Abbott and starring Nancy Carroll. Lucile often worked under the name Joan Kenyon. She explained, "My name looked Russian, I look English and I'm nearly always cast as a typical American girl. So I thought the best thing to do was give myself a new name that would not give an audience a preconceived idea of what my personality should be." In addition to acting, Lucile collaborated with her husband in his writing.

== Later years ==
During the 1930s, Kenyon and Lucile moved to a farm in the Rosemont/Stockton, New Jersey area where a colony of actors and playwrights (Moss Hart and Oscar Hammerstein II were two) had begun to grow. Several of them, with Kenyon, co-founded the Bucks County Playhouse at New Hope, Pennsylvania, just across the river from Stockton. Kenyon directed many of the Playhouse's early productions.

Kenyon became ill with arteriosclerosis in the 1960s and had been transferred to a nursing home by 1976. Lucile died of cancer on November 28, 1978, and Kenyon died on December 19, 1986, leaving no children.
