= Josephine O'Neill =

Australian film critic and poet

- Born: 15 December 1905; Dunedin, New Zealand
- Died: 28 February 1968 (aged 62); Sydney, New South Wales
- Education: St Dominic's College; University of Otago (BA)
- Occupations: Film critic and poet
- Years active: 1932–1968

Josephine O'Neill (15 December 1905 – 28 February 1968) was an Australian film critic, journalist and poet.

== Early life and education ==
O'Neill was born in Dunedin, New Zealand, on 15 December 1905. She was the first-born child of Josephine (née Monaghan) and doctor Eugene Joseph O'Neill. She completed her secondary schooling at St Dominic's College and graduated from the University of Otago in 1927 with a BA.

== Career ==
O'Neill moved to Sydney in 1928 and, with her sister Helen O'Neill, she established Aunt Ann's Aid, based on a London business known as Universal Aunts and the Useful Women. Jobs undertaken included mending clothes, visiting patients, accompanying children and shopping. They advertised in The Sun and The Sydney Morning Herald for two months and in June 1928 The Land announced that it would publish "Aunt Ann", a column answering women's questions on shopping and domestic issues. Aunt Ann's Aid advertised in The Land in 1928 (but no column appeared), and in 1929 in The Muswellbrook Chronicle and The Canberra Times.

O'Neill's short stories and poems appeared in The Sydney Morning Herald, The Sun and the Sydney Mail from 1929.

A short story by O'Neill was included in the 1932 inaugural issue of Ink, published to raise funds to enable the Society of Women Writers of New South Wales to provide assistance to members in need.

An early film review by O'Neill of Dracula and of the making of Frankenstein appeared in The Sun in December 1931. Two months earlier The Daily Telegraph had published her review of the play Street Scene, produced by Doris Fitton for the Independent Theatre. From May 1932 her reviews were published regularly in "The Daily Telegraph Talkie Section", This Week's Films and other film columns in that paper. She also wrote a chat column, "life-lines" for a year from mid-1939 but her main focus remained on film reviews.

She wrote a film treatment for a biopic on Charles Kingsford-Smith for Ken G. Hall that was not used.

O'Neill appeared on radio in Harry Dearth's "Leave it to the Girls" alongside fellow journalist Elizabeth Riddell and two others from 1951 to 1955.

From 1957 she wrote film and theatre reviews for The Sydney Morning Herald and the "Show Business" column for the Sun-Herald.

O'Neill died suddenly in Sydney of a heart attack on 28 February 1968. In an obituary of fellow critic Sylvia Lawson, Tom O'Regan wrote referred to O'Neill as "the doyenne of Australian film reviewers from the 1940s to her early death in 1968", while ... named her as one of "Australia's first wave of significant film critics, who came to prominence in the 1930s" along with Beatrice Tildeseley, Erle Cox and Kenneth Slessor.
