= Cy Howard =

American director, producer and screenwriter

- Born: Seymour Horowitz; September 27, 1915; Milwaukee, Wisconsin, U.S.
- Died: April 29, 1993 (aged 77); Los Angeles, California, U.S.
- Education: University of Wisconsin–Madison; University of Minnesota
- Occupations: Director; producer; screenwriter
- Spouses: Nan Wynn (m. 1944; div. 1947) Gloria Grahame (m. 1954; div. 1957): Barbara Warner

Cy Howard (September 27, 1915 – April 29, 1993) was an American director, producer and screenwriter. Howard created My Friend Irma, a top-rated, long-running radio situation comedy and media franchise. He won a Primetime Emmy Award in the category Outstanding Writing for a Variety Series for the television program The Smothers Brothers Comedy Hour.

== Early life and education ==
Howard was born in Milwaukee, Wisconsin, and attended Washington High School.

== Career ==
Howard worked at CBS for nine years, leaving in 1953 after he was unable to reach a contract agreement with that network. CBS had agreed to pay him more than $1 million "over a term of years", but demanded exclusive rights to his work.

== Death ==
Howard died in April 1993 of heart failure at the Cedars-Sinai Medical Center in Los Angeles, California, at the age of 77.

== Filmography ==
- Lovers and Other Strangers (1970) – Director
- Every Little Crook and Nanny (1972) – Director
- It Couldn't Happen to a Nicer Guy (1974) – Director
