= Bob Rose (actor) =

American actor and stuntman (1901–1993)

- Born: Robert Theodore Rose; February 4, 1901; Tennessee, U.S.
- Died: March 8, 1993 (aged 92); Montrose, Colorado, U.S.
- Occupation: Actor
- Years active: 1915–1979

Bob Rose (born Robert Theodore Rose; February 4, 1901 – March 8, 1993) was an American actor and stuntman.

== Early life ==
Bob Rose born Robert Theodore Rose in Tennessee was raised in Texas. While working as a jockey he was discovered by Eddie Polo and put into films.

== Career ==
At the age of fourteen, Rose doubled Ruth Roland in a serial and then started racing motorcycles and performing high dives. Rose then doubled actors such as Tom Mix, Buck Jones, Harry Houdini, Eddie Cantor, William Gargan, Ben Turpin, Chico Marx, Mary Pickford, Maureen O'Sullivan, Fay Wray and Buster Keaton among others. He performed stunts to a plane off motorcycles, cars, boats and horses and walked on the wings of planes in flight. Rose wrote the script and appeared in the film Lucky Devils that featured the lives of stuntmen.

Rose was one of the few stuntmen that didn't die in the rapids of the Copper River during the filming of The Trail of '98. Rose also worked in King Kong, She, Thank You, Jeeves!, The Hurricane, Slave Ship, Ali Baba Goes to Town, Mysterious Mr. Moto, The Rains Came, Seven Sinners, Saratoga Trunk, Fort Apache, She Wore a Yellow Ribbon, Rio Grande, The Quiet Man, Attack, The Alamo, Guns of the Timberland and The Great Race. Rose also appeared on the 1938 radio program Daredevils of Hollywood. Rose was seriously injured in a deadly plane crash with Paul Mantz during The Flight of the Phoenix. Three months later he returned to the set and completed the stunt successfully. Shortly after he doubled Larry Fine on The Outlaws Is Coming. He was one of the founders of the Stuntmen's Association of Motion Pictures and of the Hollywood Stuntman Hall of Fame.

== Death ==
Rose died in a nursing home in Montrose, Colorado on March 8, 1993. He was buried at Cory Cemetery in Delta, Colorado.

== Filmography ==
- The Master Mystery (1918) – stunt double of Harry Houdini (uncredited)
- The Grim Game (1919) – stunt double of Harry Houdini (uncredited)
- Terror Island (1920) – stunt double of Harry Houdini (uncredited)
- The Avenging Arrow (1921) – stunt double of Ruth Roland (uncredited)
- The Soul of Bronze (1921) – stunt double of Harry Houdini (uncredited)
- The Man from Beyond (1922) – stunt double of Harry Houdini (uncredited)
- Ruth of the Range (1923) – Ruth (uncredited)
- Haldane of the Secret Service (1923) – stunt of Harry Houdini (uncredited)
- The Trail of '98 (1928) – stunt double (uncredited)
- Spite Marriage (1929) – stunts (uncredited)
- Lucky Devils (1933) – stunts (uncredited)
- King Kong (1933) – stunt double of Fay Wray (uncredited)
- Wild Gold (1934) – stunt double (uncredited)
- Under the Pampas Moon (1935) – stunts (uncredited)
- In Old Kentucky (1935) – Jockey (uncredited)
- Charlie Chan in Shanghai (1935) – stunts (uncredited)
- High Tension – stunts (uncredited)
- Nancy Steele Is Missing! (1937) – stunts (uncredited)
- Slave Ship (1937) – stunts (uncredited)
- Ali Baba Goes to Town (1937) – stunt double of Eddie Cantor (uncredited)
- Carefree (1938) – Minor Role (uncredited)
- Mysterious Mr. Moto (1938) – stunts (uncredited)
- Hollywood Cavalcade (1939) – stunts (uncredited)
- Michael Shayne, Private Detective (1940) – Freddy (uncredited)
- Seven Sinners (1940) – stunts (uncredited)
- Hellzapoppin' (1941) – Shorty – Butler (uncredited)
- Footlight Fever (1941) – stunts (uncredited)
- Hurry, Charlie, Hurry (1941) – stunt double (uncredited)
- Guadalcanal Diary (1943) – Sammy Kline (uncredited)
- Fort Apache (1948) – stunts (uncredited)
- The Gay Ranchero (1948) – Breezy (as Robert Rose)
- Fighter Squadron (1948) – Radio Sergeant (uncredited)
- Big Jack (1949) – Little Man (uncredited)
- She Wore A Yellow Ribbon (1949) – stunts (uncredited)
- Rio Grande (1950) – stunts (uncredited)
- Rogue River (1951) – Carter Laney
- Excuse My Dust (1951) – Gaston (uncredited)
- His Kind of Woman (1951) – Corley's Servant (uncredited)
- A Girl in Every Port (1952) – Saboteur (uncredited)
- The Story of Will Rogers (1952) – Minor Role (uncredited)
- Torpedo Alley (1952) – Anniston
- The Quiet Man (1952) – stunts (uncredited)
- Jalopy (1953) – Jalopy Driver (uncredited)
- Salome (1953) – Townsman (uncredited)
- Hondo (1953) – stunts (uncredited)
- The McConnell Story (1955) – Boardinghouse Roomer (uncredited)
- The Rains of Ranchipur (1955) – stunts (uncredited)
- Love Me Tender (1956) – Station Agent (uncredited)
- Attack (1956) – stunts (uncredited)
- The Alamo (1960) – stunts (uncredited)
- The Outlaws Is Coming (1965) – stunt double (Larry Fine, uncredited)
- The Great Race (1965) – stunts (uncredited)
- The Flight of the Phoenix (1965) – stunt double – stunts (Richard Attenborough, uncredited)
- Rough Night in Jericho (1967) – Dealer (uncredited)
- The Fantastic Seven (1979) – stunts

== Television ==
- Dick Tracy – Hi-Jack (1951) TV Episode .... Mr. Rones
- The Adventures of Kit Carson – Trouble at Fort Mojave (1953) TV Episode – Powdersmoke Law (1953) TV Episode
- Dragnet – The Big Set (1956) TV Episode
- The Adventures of Jim Bowie – Pirate on Horseback (1958) TV Episode .... Williams
- Have Gun – Will Travel – Full Circle (1960) TV Episode .... Bartender
- The Felony Squad – The Killer Instinct (1966) TV Episode .... Fingerprint Expert
