= Gloria Talbott =

American actress (1931–2000)

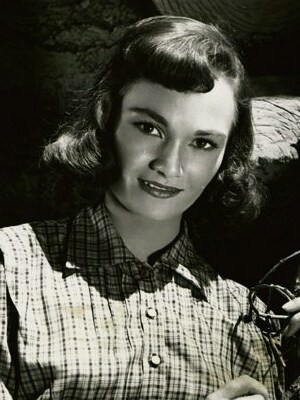
- Publicity still for the film Northern Patrol (1953)
- Born: Gloria Maude Talbott; February 7, 1931; Glendale, California, U.S.
- Died: September 19, 2000 (aged 69); Glendale, California, U.S.
- Occupation: Actress
- Years active: 1935–1966
- Spouse(s): Gene Parrish (1948-1953) (divorced); Grover Sandy Sanders (1956-1964?) (divorced); Steve Joseph Capobianco (1967-1969) (divorced); Patrick Robert "Michael" Mullally (1970-?)
- Children: Mark Charles (1950); Maria L. (1967)

Gloria Maude Talbott (February 7, 1931 – September 19, 2000) was an American film and television actress.

== Early life and career ==
Gloria Talbott was born in Glendale, California. Her great-grandfather Benjamin F. Patterson arrived from Ohio in 1882 and bought some acreage in the area. He later assisted with the platting of the city.

She began her career as a child actress in such films as Maytime (1937), Sweet and Low-Down (1944), and A Tree Grows In Brooklyn (1945). She attended Glendale High School. In 1947, she was chosen as the winner of the "Miss Glendale" beauty pageant. In November 1948, Talbott was in the cast of One Fine Day, a comedy presented on stage at the Biltmore Theater in Los Angeles.

Her sister, Lori Talbott, also became an actress.

== Film roles ==
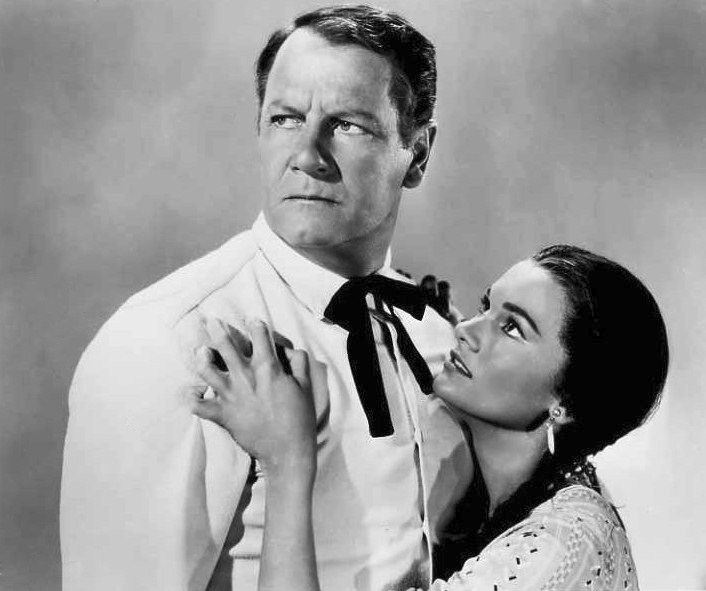
Joel McCrea and Talbott in The Oklahoman (1957)

Talbott worked in film regularly during the 1950s. In 1952, she had the role of Rose Rodriguez in The Rodriguez Story featurette. She appeared in Crashout (1955), the Humphrey Bogart comedy We're No Angels (1955), Lucy Gallant (1955), and All That Heaven Allows (1955).

In 1959, she appeared as an Indian, first in The Oregon Trail with Fred MacMurray as Shona and then in Alias Jesse James with Bob Hope as Princess Irawanee.

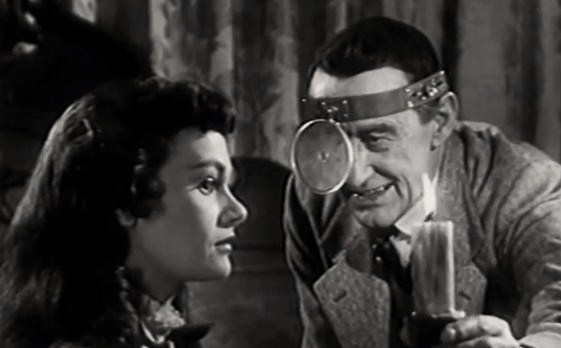
Gloria Talbott and Arthur Shields in The Daughter of Dr. Jekyll (1957)

She later became known as a "scream queen", after appearing in a number of horror films, including The Daughter of Dr. Jekyll (1957), The Cyclops (1957), I Married a Monster from Outer Space (1958), and The Leech Woman (1960).

Her final film role was as Bri Quince, the love interest in the 1966 Western film An Eye for an Eye.

== Television roles ==
In 1953, Talbott appeared in "The Crime of Sylvester Bonnard" and "High Seas" on Favorite Story, starred in "The Dear Departed" on Chevron Theatre and played Herelda in "Gypsy Wagon," an episode of The Gene Autry Show.

In 1955, she appeared in TV Reader's Digest episode "America's First Great Lady" as Pocahontas and was the first guest star with roles in both of the 1955 season's new adult Westerns, Gunsmoke, episode "Home Surgery" and The Life and Legend of Wyatt Earp, episode 2 "Mr. Earp Meets a Lady".

On November 27, 1956, she starred as Maureen in a science-fiction episode of the television anthology series Conflict entitled "Man From 1997" featuring Charlie Ruggles and James Garner. She guest-starred in the premiere episode of Mr. Adams and Eve, "The Young Actress", which was broadcast on January 4, 1957. On October 1, 1957, she appeared as Linda Brazwell in the episode "Reluctant Hero" of the ABC/Warner Bros. Western television series Sugarfoot.

Talbott's multiple television credits also include the syndicated Adventures of Superman, The Range Rider, The Cisco Kid, the NBC Western anthology series Frontier (1955), and the syndicated Western-themed crime drama, The Sheriff of Cochise with John Bromfield. She appeared in the 1956 episode "The Singing Preacher" of the religious anthology series, Crossroads.

In a broadcast on NBC on January 27, 1958, Talbott played Valya in star/producer John Payne's The Restless Gun, season one, episode 19, "Hang and Be Damned". She was cast in the syndicated American Civil War drama Gray Ghost, the 1958 episode "Fatal Memory" on CBS's Wanted: Dead or Alive (returning for the 1960 episode "Tolliver Bender"), the 1959 episode "Have Sword, Will Duel" of the NBC Western Cimarron City, and in the 1961 NBC Western Whispering Smith in the role of Cora Gates.

She guest-starred as Jenny in the 1958 episode "A Cup of Black Coffee" of the CBS crime drama Richard Diamond, Private Detective, starring David Janssen, with whom she appeared in the 1955 film All That Heaven Allows. She also guest-starred in several episodes of ABC's Zorro.

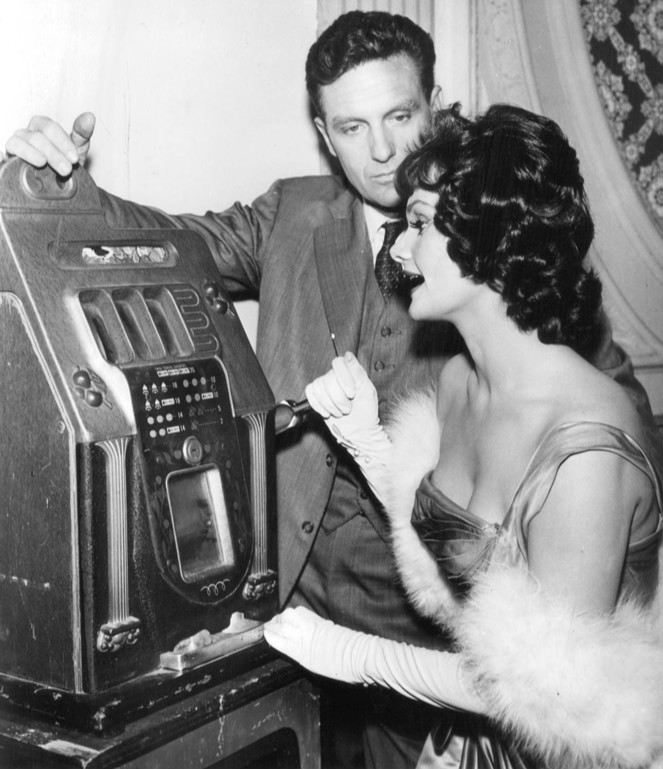
Robert Stack and Talbott in The Untouchables, 1962

In 1960, Talbott made guest-starring appearances as Nora Lanyard and Lucinda Jennings in the episodes "Landlubbers" and "Devil in Skirts" of the NBC Western series, Riverboat. She was cast as Sandy in "The Velvet Frame" of the ABC/WB drama, The Roaring 20s. She also appeared in the ABC Western series, The Rebel and in Bonanza as Nedda in the episode "Escape to Ponderosa". In 1961, she portrayed Maria Mosner in the episode "The Twenty-Six Paper" of the ABC adventure series, The Islanders. That same year, she guest-starred in the episode "Buddy's Wife" of the CBS sitcom Bringing Up Buddy.

She appeared twice on CBS's TV Western series Bat Masterson, once in the 1958 episode "Trail Pirate" playing Ellen Parrish, a widowed yet brave wagon train owner, then again in the 1960 episode "Barbary Castle" playing Scottish-accented Mary MacLeod. She also appeared on CBS's Rawhide in the episodes "The Incident of the Calico Gun" (1959), "Incident of the Broken Word" (1960), and "Prairie Elephant" (1961). She appeared in the 1961 episode "Terror in the Afternoon" of the syndicated crime drama The Brothers Brannagan. She appeared as Martha on Wagon Train S5, E34 "The Frank Carter Story" in 1962.

Talbott made four guest appearances on the CBS courtroom drama series Perry Mason: as defendant Eve Nesbitt in "The Case of the Angry Dead Man", Ann Gilrain in "The Case of the Crying Comedian" (both in 1961), co-defendant Bonnie Lloyd in the 1963 episode, "The Case of the Elusive Element", and Minna Rohan in the 1966 episode, "The Case of the Unwelcomed Well".

In 1962, she appeared again in an episode of Gunsmoke called "Cody's Code" and in 1963 in an episode entitled "The Cousin".

In 1965, Talbott was cast in the lead in an episode of the syndicated series, Death Valley Days, "Kate Melville and the Law". In 1965 Talbott appeared as Lola Wynatt in season 5 Episode 10 of My Three Sons which also featured Jamie Farr.

== Personal life ==
Talbott was married four times and had two children.

== Death ==
On September 19, 2000, Talbott died of kidney failure while hospitalized in Glendale, California, age 69.

== Filmography ==
Film

- Maytime (1937) - Little Girl (uncredited)
- Sweet and Low-Down (1944) - Teen-Ager on Dance Floor (uncredited)
- A Tree Grows in Brooklyn (1945) - Teen-Age Girl in Classroom (uncredited)
- Desert Pursuit (1952) - Indian Girl (uncredited)
- We're Not Married! (1952) - Girl in Hector's Daydream (uncredited)
- Northern Patrol (1953) - Meg Stevens
- Crashout (1955) - Girl on Train
- We're No Angels (1955) - Isabelle Ducotel
- All That Heaven Allows (1955) - Kay Scott
- Lucy Gallant (1955) - Laura Wilson
- Strange Intruder (1956) - Meg Carmichael
- The Young Guns (1956) - Nora Bawdre
- Sneak Preview (1956) - Episode "One Minute from Broadway"
- The Kettles on Old MacDonald's Farm (1957) - Sally Flemming
- The Oklahoman (1957) - Maria Smith
- The Cyclops (1957) - Susan Winter
- The Daughter of Dr. Jekyll (1957) - Janet Smith
- Taming Sutton's Gal (1957) - Lou Sutton
- Cattle Empire (1958) - Sandy Jeffrey
- I Married a Monster from Outer Space (1958) - Marge Bradley Farrell
- Alias Jesse James (1959) - Princess Irawanie
- The Oregon Trail (1959) - Shona Hastings
- Girls Town (1959) - Vida
- Oklahoma Territory (1960) - Ruth Red Hawk
- The Leech Woman (1960) - Sally
- Arizona Raiders (1965) - Martina
- An Eye for an Eye (1966) - Bri Quince (final film role)

Television

- The Adventures of Wild Bill Hickok - Consuelo (as Gloria Talbot) in S2.E9 (1951), "Border City"
- The Abbott and Costello Show - Crying Woman (uncredited) in S1.E16 (1953), "The Politician"
- Cavalcade of America
  - Cavalcade of America - Mary Scott (as Gloria Talbot) in S2.E30 (1954), "Moonlight School"
  - Cavalcade of America - Nancy Merki in S4.E1 (1955), "A Time for Courage"
  - Cavalcade of America - Mary in S4.E13 (1956), "The Prison Within"
- Gunsmoke (1955-1975, TV Series)
  - Gunsmoke (1955-1975, TV Series) - Holly Hawtree in S1.E4 (1955), "Home Surgery"
  - Gunsmoke (1955-1975, TV Series) - Rose in S7.E17 (1962), "Cody's Code"
  - Gunsmoke (1955-1975, TV Series) - Hallie in S8.E21 (1962), "The Cousin"
- The Life and Legend of Wyatt Earp
  - The Life and Legend of Wyatt Earp - Abbie Crandall in S1.E2 (1955), "Mr. Earp Meets a Lady"
  - The Life and Legend of Wyatt Earp - Martha Connell in S6.E32 (1961), "Hiding Behind a Star"
- Sneak Preview (1956) - Episode "One Minute from Broadway"
- The Adventures of Superman (1956) - Mara Van Cleaver - Episode "The Girl Who Hired Superman"
- Mr. Adams and Eve (1957) - The Actress - Episode "The Young Actress"
- Mickey Spillane's Mike Hammer - Judy Rogers in S1.E13 (1958), "Stay Out of Town"
- The Restless Gun
  - The Restless Gun (1958) - as Valya in S1.E19 (1958), "Hang and be Damned"
  - The Restless Gun (1958) as Sophie Wilmer in S1.E31 (1958), "The Outlander"
  - The Restless Gun (1958) as Mercyday Giffen in S2.E3 (1958), "Mercyday"
- Wanted: Dead or Alive
  - Wanted: Dead or Alive - Jody Sykes in S1.E2 (1958), "Fatal Memory"
  - Wanted: Dead or Alive - Adelaide Bender in S2.E23 (1960), "Tolliver Bender"
  - Wanted: Dead or Alive - Jennifer Clay (as Gloria Talbot) in S3.E13 (1960), "Three for One"
- The Restless Gun (1958) as Mercyday in Episode "Mercyday"
- Bat Masterson
  - Bat Masterson - Ellen Parish in S1.E12 (1958), "Trail Pirate"
  - Bat Masterson - Mary MacLeod in S2.E37 (1960), "Barbary Castle"
- Zorro
  - Zorro - Moneta Esperon in S2.E27 (1959), "The Man from Spain"
  - Zorro - Moneta Esperon in S2.E28 (1959), "Treasure for the King"
  - Zorro - Moneta Esperon in S2.E29 (1959), "Exposing the Tyrant"
  - Zorro - Moneta Esperon in S2.E30 (1959), "Zorro Takes a Dare"
- Tales of Wells Fargo
  - Tales of Wells Fargo - Fay Dooley in S3.E17 (1959), "Showdown Trail"
  - Tales of Wells Fargo - Narcissa in S6.E9 (1961), "Defiant at the Gate"
- Oklahoma Territory (1960) - Ruth Red Hawk
- Bonanza (1960) -Nedda in S1:E25 "Escape to Ponderosa"
- Laramie
  - Laramie - Maud Pardee in S1:E26 (1960), “Hour After Dawn”
  - Laramie - Jane Smith in S2:E14 (1961), “The Passing of Kuba Smith”
  - Laramie - Sally Malone in S3.E2 (1961), "Ladies' Day"
  - Laramie - Nora in S4.E13 (1963), "Naked Steel"
- Rawhide
  - Rawhide (1959) – Jenny Watson in S1:E15, "Incident of the Calico Gun"
  - Rawhide (1961) – Lucille Foley in S3:E11, "Incident of the Broken Word"
  - Rawhide (1961) – Jenny in S4:E8, "The Prairie Elephant"
- Death Valley Days
  - Death Valley Days - Mary Kileen in S10.E1 (1961), "Queen of Spades"
  - Death Valley Days - Gilda Benning in S12.E19 (1964), "The Bigger They Are"
  - Death Valley Days - Kate Melville in S13.E25 (1965), "Kate Melville and the Law"
- Whispering Smith (1961) - Cora Gates
- Perry Mason
  - Perry Mason - Eve Nesbitt in S4.E18 (1961), "The Case of the Angry Dead Man"
  - Perry Mason - Anne Gilrain in S5.E5 (1961), "The Case of the Crying Comedian"
  - Perry Mason - Bonnie Lloyd in S6.E24 (1963), "The Case of the Elusive Element"
  - Perry Mason - Minna Rohan in S9.E25 (1966), :The Case of the Unwelcome Well"
