= Paul Mantz =

American aviator, air racing pilot, movie stunt pilot (1903–1965)

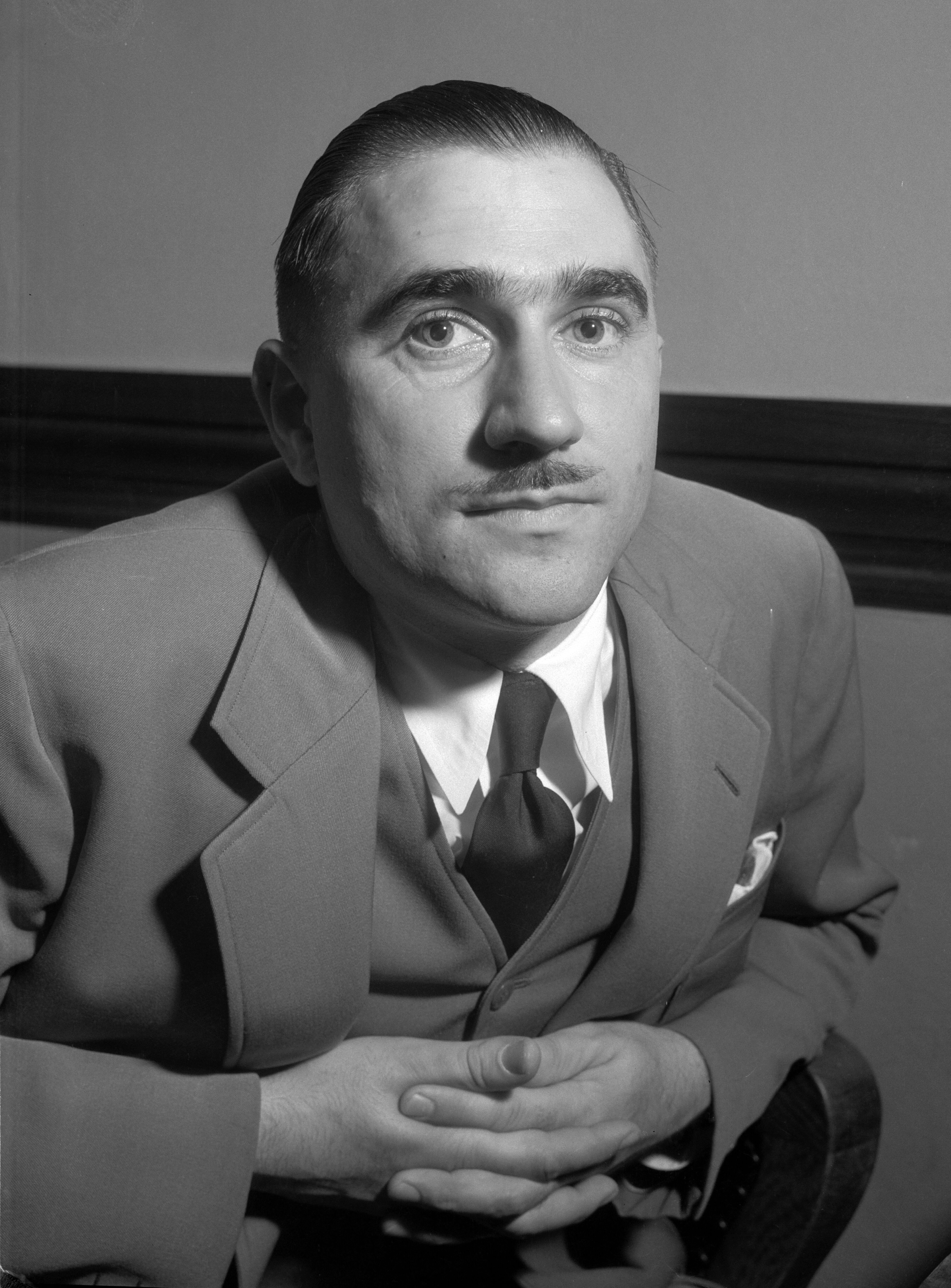
- Paul Mantz, 1936
- Born: Albert Paul Mantz; August 2, 1903; Alameda, California, U.S
- Died: July 8, 1965 (aged 61); Arizona (filming location)
- Cause of death: Aircraft crash
- Occupations: Aviator; Consultant
- Spouse(s): Theresa (Terry) Mae Minor Mantz; Myrtle "Red" Harvey (divorced)
- Children: 3

Albert Paul Mantz (August 2, 1903 – July 8, 1965) was an American air racing and movie stunt pilot and consultant from the late 1930s until his death in the mid-1960s. He gained fame on two stages: Hollywood and in air races.

== Early years ==
Paul Mantz (the name he used throughout his life) was born Albert Paul Mantz in Alameda, California, the son of a school principal, and was raised in nearby Redwood City, California. He developed his interest in flying at an early age; as a young boy, his first flight on fabricated canvas wings was aborted when his mother stopped him as he tried to launch off the branch of a tree in his yard. In 1915, at age 12, he attended the Panama Pacific Exposition in San Francisco and witnessed the world-famous Lincoln Beachey make his first ever flight in his new monoplane, the Lincoln Beachey Special.

Mantz took his first flying lesson at age 16 using money that he made from driving a hearse during the influenza epidemic of 1919. Although he had accumulated hours towards his private pilot certificate, Mantz quit flying when he witnessed the death of his instructor.

On September 24, 1924, Mantz became a part of a famous aviation event when he lent his car battery to the Douglas World Cruiser that had "dead-sticked" into a field on its way to San Francisco for a celebration of the world flight.

== U.S. Army air cadet ==
Mantz applied for admission to the United States Army flight school at March Field, California but was told he needed at least two years of college to be eligible. Apparently resorting to a ruse involving Stanford University stationery, he managed to gain admission with false documents and became a successful cadet. He did not inform officials of his prior flying experience.

In 1927, shortly before his graduation at March Field, Mantz was flying solo over the Coachella Valley when he spotted a train heading west over the empty desert floor up the long grade from Indio. He rolled over into a dive, leveled off a few feet above the track and flew head-on towards the train as the engineer repeatedly sounded the whistle. At the last moment Mantz pulled up, did a "victory roll" and flew away. This sort of dangerous stunt was fairly common during the early era of loosely regulated flying in the 1920s, but the train's passengers included ranking officers coming to March Field to participate in the graduation ceremonies and Mantz was subsequently dismissed from the army. His instructor reportedly made it clear to him that he had the makings of an exceptional pilot and encouraged him to continue a career in aviation.

== Hollywood stunt pilot ==
After working briefly in commercial aviation, Mantz went to Hollywood, attracted by the large sums of money movie stunt pilots were making at the time. A main requirement was Associated Motion Picture Pilots (AMPP) membership but that was only gained after employment in the industry. In an effort to gain notoriety, on July 6, 1930, Mantz set a record in flying 46 consecutive outside loops as a part of the dedication ceremonies of the San Mateo airport. Although he gained recognition as an accomplished pilot, without the AMPP card, he still could not work in Hollywood. However, in 1931, Mantz performed the climactic stunt in The Galloping Ghost which required him to fly down a canyon and just miss a prominent sycamore. Misjudging his approach, Mantz crashed into the tree but the film crew got their shot and he got his AMPP card.

Howard Hughes was among his first clients. After much difficulty finding steady stunt work, he accepted a particularly risky assignment, flying a Curtiss-Wright CW-16K through a hangar with less than five feet of clearance off each wingtip for the 1932 film Air Mail. Mantz reportedly handled the challenge with thorough planning, which set him apart from most of the pilots then flying stunts for the movies.

Air Mail was a hit and as word spread about his success in getting through the hangar unscathed, Mantz found more work and his professional ideas about stunt flying were gradually accepted by the studios. United Air Services, Mantz fledgling company at United Airport in Burbank, offered readily available aircraft and pilots, standard rates and insurance to protect producers from the financial risks of accidents and downtime. Mantz's company grew steadily along with the public's fascination with flying as the studios made increasing numbers of aviation related films. His Paul Mantz Air Services air charter company (jokingly christened the Honeymoon Express) also flourished and became a favorite among Hollywood stars, many of whom, such as Clark Gable and James Cagney became friends. One of his helicopters appears in the Errol Flynn short documentary film, Cruise of the Zaca (1952), as featured on the 2 disc Special Edition DVD of The Adventures of Robin Hood.

== Other activities ==
During this period, Mantz carried out a number of "mercy" flights including transporting a deep sea diver to the Mare Island Navy Yard where a decompression chamber was used to save his life, flying 15 Mexican fishermen to safety after their boat began to break up, and dropping supplies to assist 53 trapped firefighters in the Santa Barbara mountains. Mantz had to fly low through an inferno in order to make the drop. After Tom Mix's accident and death, Mantz was also chosen to fly the body of Mix home.

In 1937, a few months before Amelia Earhart vanished over the western Pacific Ocean, Mantz, acting as a technical advisor, tutored her in long-distance flying and navigation.

Earhart asked Mantz to pilot the landing at Wheeler Army Airfield, Honolulu, after an overnight, 15-hour 47-minute flight from Oakland, California, of Earhart’s Lockheed Electra 10E Special, registration NR16020, with crew: pilot Amelia Earhart, co-pilot Paul Mantz, navigator Frederick Joseph Noonan, radio operator and navigator Harry Manning.

Air racing also became a passion for Mantz in the late-1930s. He entered his Lockheed Orion in the Bendix Trophy transcontinental dash from Los Angeles to Cleveland, placing third in 1938 and 1939.

On July 4, 1938, Mantz flew from Wichita to Burbank, California, accompanied by Paramount press agent, pilot, and pulp writer, Edward Churchill, in an attempt to break the speed-dash record. The stunt was part of the promotion for the film Men With Wings. The flight ran into several difficulties. The motor overheated over the Grand Canyon. When they reached Burbank, the landing gear jammed and it took 30 minutes to work it loose, while thousands of spectators looked from the ground and the fuel ran perilously low. Churchill was stricken with carbon monoxide poisoning and had to be treated by a physician after landing.

== World War II ==
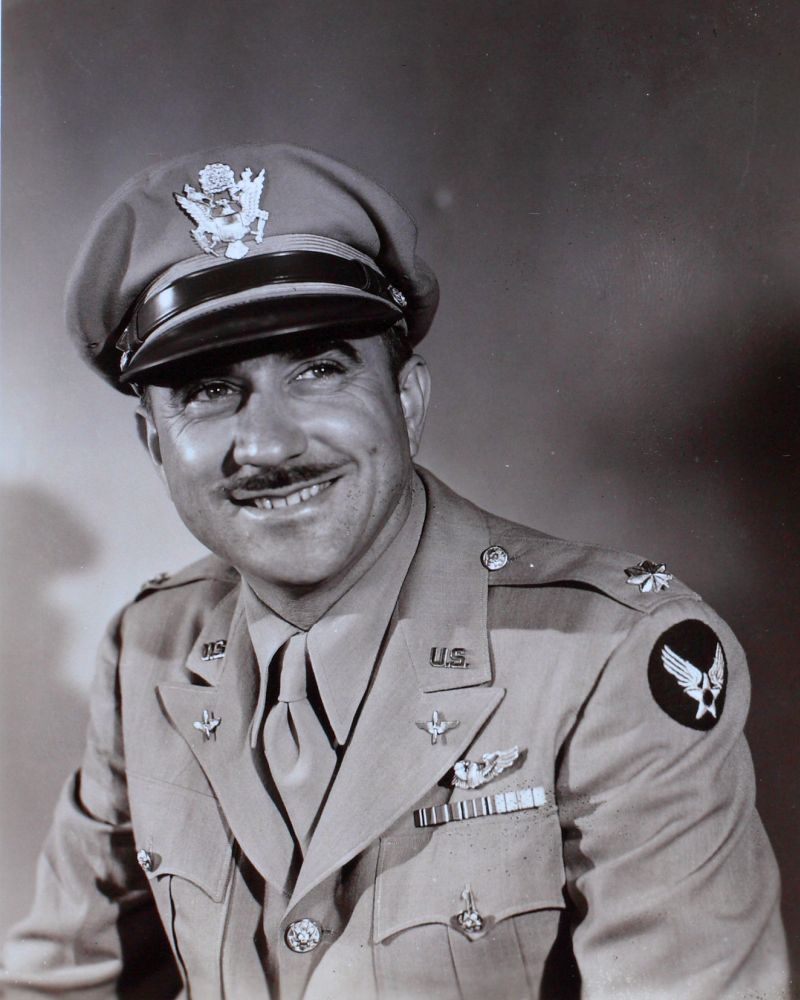
Paul Mantz as a Major in the First Motion Picture Unit of the U.S. Army Air Forces.

During World War II, Mantz enlisted and was commissioned a major (later promoted to lieutenant colonel), serving in the First Motion Picture Unit (FMPU) in California. Following an August 1944 honorable discharge, Mantz purchased a fleet of 475 wartime surplus bombers and fighters (including North American P-51 Mustang fighters) for $55,000 to use in film work. Mantz joked that he had the sixth-largest air force in the world, and sold the fleet's onboard fuel for a profit on his initial investment. Retaining only 12 aircraft, the remainder of his "air force" was sold off as "scrap" at a handsome profit. When the P-38 was in development, Mantz was test pilot along with flight engineer, Simon Severson. This twin engine aircraft design went on to become a major success for victory.

== Racing pilot ==
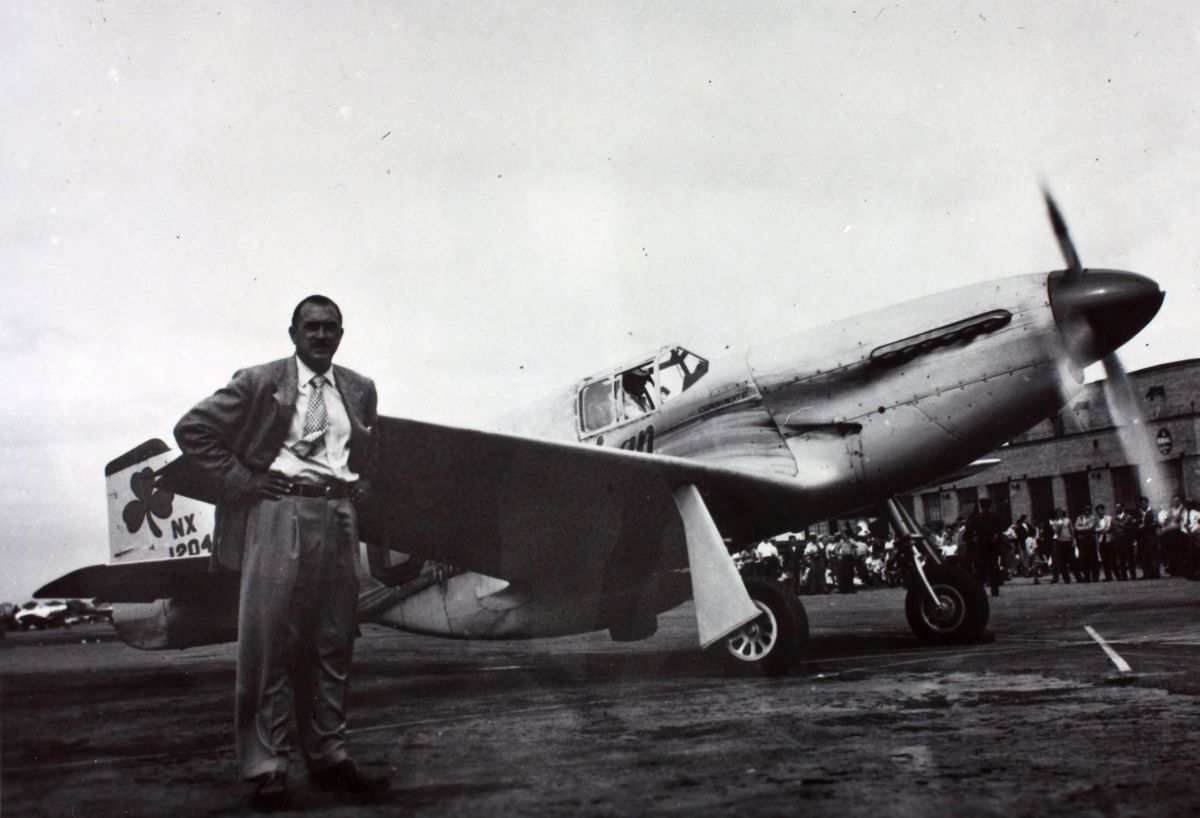
With P-51 in which he won 1948 Bendix Trophy

With his film fleet in place, Mantz chose one of the P-51 fighters to convert it into a Bendix Trophy racer. With his longtime mechanic, Cort Johnson, he totally rebuilt the P-51C, stripping out all military issue equipment and modifying the wings with "wet" fuel cells. In the 1946 Bendix Trophy race, all the competitors flew similar converted warbirds, but Mantz prevailed with an average speed of 435 mph. He went on to win the Bendix for an unprecedented three consecutive years (1946–1948) with over $125,000.00 in winnings.

== Postwar film career ==
In 1945, Mantz flew a P-40 and directed aerial sequences in God Is My Co-Pilot (1945). He single-handedly piloted a Boeing B-17 for the "near-suicidal" belly landing scene in Twelve O'Clock High (1949) and the footage was reused in several other movies. For that stunt, he reportedly received one of the highest fees ever paid up to that time ($4,500 in 1949 dollars or $58,000 in 2024).

NBC hired Mantz in 1953 to fly footage of the coronation of Elizabeth II from Montreal to New York in a P-51, so the network could broadcast it the same day.

His longest single flying assignment was in the late 1950s, for the TV series Sky King.

Mantz piloted a converted B-25 bomber to film footage for Cinerama travelogues. According to an interview in the documentary Cinerama Adventure with Mantz's cameraman, in one instance, Mantz flew through an active volcano and narrowly escaped crashing into the mouth of the volcano when the engines died due to oxygen starvation. Mantz's B-25 was outfitted with a refrigerator and other amenities for comfort as he used it for world travel on film assignments.

Mantz came up with the idea for filming the opening shot for the 1955 film Bad Day at Black Rock in which an aerial view of an approaching passenger train was filmed in reverse with the consist backing away from the camera helicopter as flying towards the train was too dangerous. The sequence was then reversed in the film.

Mantz used his B-25 to film Cinerama sequences of military aircraft at Eglin Air Force Base, Florida, in October and November 1956, for the Lowell Thomas production Search for Paradise, released in 1957. Also, in 1957, he was the behind the scene pilot for the film “The Spirit of St. Louis.”

In 1961, aged 58, Mantz formed Tallmantz Aviation with pilot Frank Tallman, supplying aircraft along with their personal stunt flying services to movie and television productions. Together they were involved in several movies, including performing the flying sequences in a Beech 18 in the 1963 comedy It’s a Mad Mad Mad Mad World.

== Airline ==
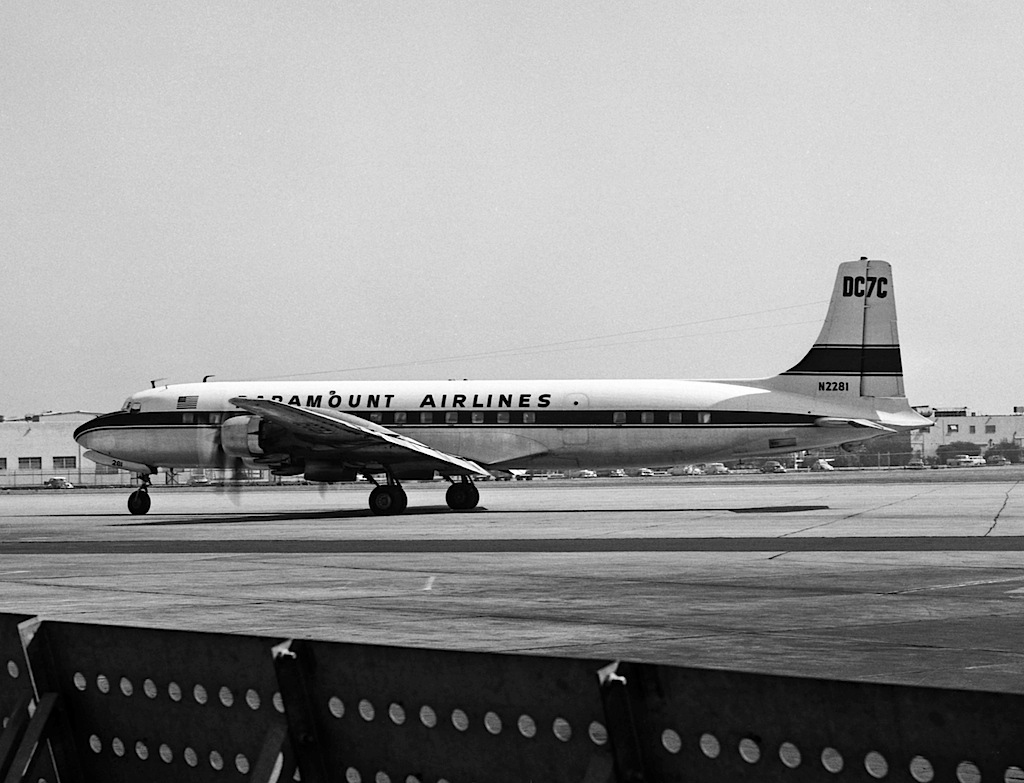
Paramount Airlines DC-7C San Diego 1962

Paul Mantz Air Services operated as a supplemental air carrier (originally known as a nonscheduled carrier or irregular air carrier) from 1947 onward as a sole proprietorship. Until 1953, the airline operated purely charters, mostly for motion picture companies and the US Forest Service. However, in January 1953, Mantz gave control of his airline to the North Star combine, a ticket agency that operated the Mantz airline in scheduled service, which was illegal. During this time, the Mantz airline operated a C-46 aircraft leased from another North Star airline. In 1959, an investigation by the Civil Aeronautics Board, the now defunct US Federal agency that, at the time, tightly regulated almost all US commercial air transportation, allowed the airline to keep its operating authority, notwithstanding an initial judgment by the CAB examiner that it should not. However, from late 1953, the airline no longer flew large air transport aircraft. In 1960, Mantz transferred the activities to a corporate entity that he controlled, Paul Mantz Air Services, Inc. In 1961, this corporation changed its name to Paramount Airlines, Inc.

However, in 1962, the CAB declined to certificate Paramount under the terms of a new Federal law, as was required for the airline to keep operating. The CAB did so because from March 1961, when the airline resumed operation, the CAB believed Paramount was under the control of another combine, called Skycoach, which had arranged for Paramount's sale from Mantz to a third party. During this period, Paramount operated with two Lockheed Constellation and, from 1962, two Douglas DC-7C aircraft.

== Family life ==
In 1932, Mantz married Myrtle "Red" Harvey, one of his former flying students, but divorced in 1935. He remarried two years later to Theresa "Terry" Mae Minor and had a son, Paul, Jr., with her. He adopted her two children by a previous marriage to Roy T. Minor (1904–1935), Roy, Jr. and Nita Lou "Tenita". The Mantz family lived on Balboa Island, off Newport Beach, California, where Mantz had a yacht. After years of successful ventures in both air racing and movie work, he had accumulated more than $10 million in profits, and by 1965, was planning his retirement. When his partner, Frank Tallman, broke his leg in a freak accident, Mantz stepped in to finish the aerial scenes for one last movie project.

== Death ==
Mantz died on July 8, 1965, while working on the movie The Flight of the Phoenix, which was produced and directed by Robert Aldrich. Flying a very unusual aircraft, the Tallmantz Phoenix P-1 built especially for the film, Mantz struck a small hillock while skimming over a desert site in the Algodones Sand Dunes for a second take. As Mantz attempted to recover by opening the throttle to its maximum, the over-stressed aircraft broke in two and nosed over into the ground, killing Mantz instantly. Bobby Rose, a stuntman standing behind Mantz in the cockpit and representing a character played by Hardy Krüger, was seriously injured.

The FAA investigation noted Mantz's alcohol consumption before the flight and said the resulting impairment to his "efficiency and judgment" contributed to the accident. Thirteen years later, his business partner, Frank Tallman, also died in an aviation mishap.

Some who were with Mantz during the shoot dispute that he was flying under the influence, although they acknowledge he was drinking alcohol the night before the fatal flight. Toxicology tests were performed several hours after the accident; in the absence of refrigeration, normal postmortem biochemical processes might produce blood ethanol and cause or contribute to an elevated BAC level.

Out of respect, neither take appeared in the completed film, although the accident was shown in contemporary newsreels and stills of the moment of impact have been published. The final credits of The Flight of the Phoenix bear a tribute to Paul Mantz: "It should be remembered ... that Paul Mantz, a fine man and a brilliant flyer gave his life in the making of this film ..."

I'm not a stunt pilot. I'm a precision pilot.

— Paul Mantz, 1934,

== Film portrayals ==
In the 1988 TV movie Pancho Barnes, Mantz was portrayed by Kurt Rhoads. In Amelia Earhart, a 1976 made-for-television biographical film, he was played by Stephen Macht.

== Awards ==
- Bendix Trophy, 1946, 1947, 1948
- Inducted into the Motorsports Hall of Fame of America in 2002.
- Inducted into the International Council of Air Shows Foundation Hall of Fame

== See also ==
- Amelia Earhart
- Art Scholl
