= Cimarron City (TV series) =

American Western television series

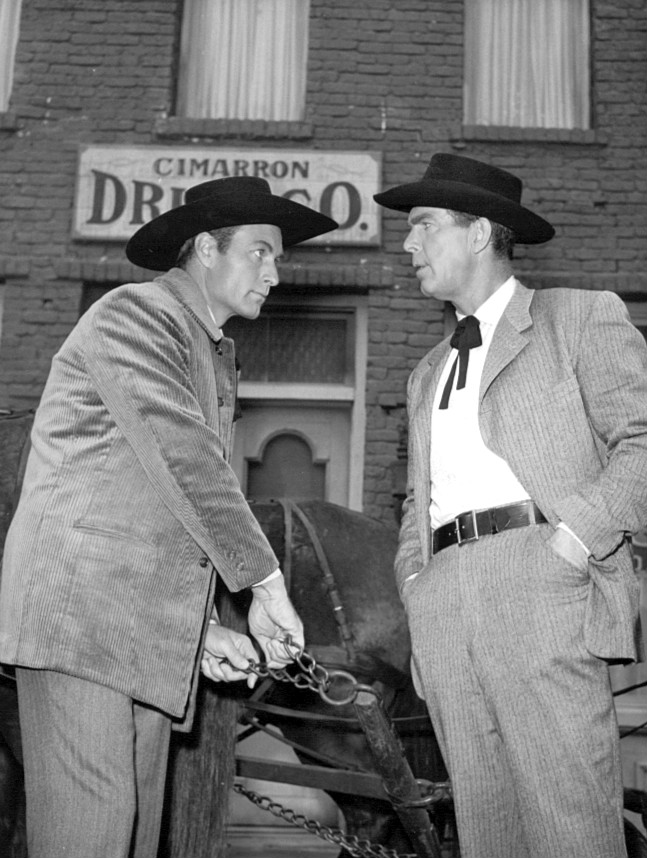
- George Montgomery as Matthew Rockford, with guest star Fred MacMurray, in "I, the People" (1958)
- Genre: Western
- Written by: Norman Jolley; Richard Morgan; Tom Seller
- Directed by: Richard Bartlett; Abner Biberman; John Meredyth Lucas
- Starring: George Montgomery; John Smith; Audrey Totter; Dan Blocker
- Theme music composer: Frederick Herbert; Stanley Wilson
- Composer: Paul Dunlap
- Country of origin: United States
- Original language: English
- No. of seasons: 1
- No. of episodes: 26

Production
- Producers: Richard Bartlett; Norman Jolley
- Cinematography: Jack MacKenzie; William A. Sickner; John F. Warren
- Editor: Lee Huntington
- Running time: 60 minutes
- Production companies: Mont Productions; Revue Studios

Original release
- Network: NBC
- Release: September 27, 1958 – April 4, 1959

Cimarron City is an American one-hour Western television series, starring George Montgomery as Matt Rockford and John Smith as Lane Temple, airing on NBC from October 11, 1958, to September 26, 1959. Cimarron City is a boomtown in Logan County, Oklahoma, north of Oklahoma City. Rich in oil and gold, Cimarron City aspires to become the capital of the future state of Oklahoma, to be created in 1907.

== Synopsis ==
Matthew Rockford is the son of an area cattle rancher, who is the founder and mayor of Cimarron City. Lane Temple, the blacksmith, serves also as the deputy sheriff. He maintains the law amid the crooked schemes concocted in Cimarron City.

Audrey Totter played Beth Purcell, the owner of the boarding house. The episodes were supposed to rotate equally among Montgomery, Smith, and Totter. The writers, however, did not give Totter enough stories as promised, and she was phased out in favor of male leads.

Cimarron City also featured Dan Blocker (before Bonanza) in two roles. In the second episode, Blocker plays outlaw Carl Budinger, who is killed. In the fourth episode, he reappears as Carl's good-hearted brother, Tiny Budinger, who becomes one of Rockford's ranch hands.

== Production notes ==
The producers were Richard Bartlett and Norman Jolley. Stanley Wilson wrote the theme music.

In its initial run, Cimarron City was placed opposite two half-hour Western programs on CBS, Have Gun, Will Travel and Gunsmoke, from 9:30 to 10:30 p.m. Eastern Time on Saturdays. From June 1960 to September 1960, reruns were shown on Fridays from 7:30 to 8:30 p.m. Eastern Time, again on NBC.

Newspaper columnist Erskine Johnson wrote that NBC created Cimarron City expressly "to shoot it out with CBS TV's two guns – the half-hour Have Gun and the top-rated Gunsmoke, in most sections of the country." When the show's ratings failed to meet NBC executives' expectations, Smith's and Totter's roles grew in size and Montgomery "became a wanderer instead of a stay-at-home"; writers and directors were also changed. NBC spent additional money to bring in guest stars while sponsors were leaving the show, with several episodes having no sponsor. Toward the end of the series' original run, NBC found four rotating sponsors, some of whom limited their involvement to purchasing spot announcements.

== Cast ==
- George Montgomery as Matt Rockford, Mayor and as narrator
- John Smith as Deputy Lane Temple
- Audrey Totter as Beth Purcell
- Dan Blocker as Tiny and Carl Budinger
- Wally Brown as Jed Fame
- Claire Carleton as Alice Purdy
- Pete Dunn as Dody Hamer
- George Dunn as Jesse Williams
- Tom Fadden as Silas Perry
- Stuart Randall as Sheriff Art Sampson
- Addison Richards as Martin Kingsley
- Fred Sherman as Burt Purdy
- Nesdon Booth as Frank the bartender

=== Guest stars ===
- Nick Adams
- Morris Ankrum
- Frank Bank (uncredited)
- Edgar Buchanan
- John Carradine
- Albert Cavens
- Spencer Chan
- Walter Coy
- Linda Darnell
- Tex Driscoll
- Dan Duryea
- Olive Carey
- Spencer Chan
- Mike Connors
- Eduard Franz
- Robert Fuller
- John Goddard
- Peter Graves
- Raymond Guth
- Herman Hack
- Chick Hannan
- Myron Healey
- Carol Henry
- Ed Hinton
- Bern Hoffman
- Clyde Howdy
- Gary Hunley
- Richard Jaeckel
- Vivi Janiss
- Douglas Kennedy
- Barbara Lawrence
- Norman Leavitt
- John Litel
- June Lockhart
- Fred MacMurray
- Dorothy Malone
- Ted Mapes
- Ken Mayer
- Rod McGaughy
- John McIntire
- Gary Merrill
- Elizabeth Montgomery
- Rita Moreno
- J. Carrol Naish
- Debra Paget
- Gregg Palmer
- Luana Patten
- Larry Pennell
- Joe Ploski
- Mike Ragan
- Jack Reitzen
- Jason Robards, Sr.
- Pernell Roberts
- Frank J. Scannell
- George Sowards
- Boyd Stockman
- Dean Stockwell
- Randy Stuart
- Gloria Talbott
- William Talman
- Robert Tetrick
- Jack Tornek
- Lee Van Cleef

== Episode list ==
No. in season	Title	Directed by	Written by	Original release date
1	"I, the People"	Jules Bricken	Fenton Earnshaw	October 11, 1958
2	"Terror Town"	Richard H. Bartlett	Trebor Lewis	October 18, 1958
3	"To Become a Man"	Richard H. Bartlett	Norman Jolley	October 25, 1958
4	"Twelve Guns"	Richard H. Bartlett	Lew Richards & Norman Jolley	November 1, 1958
5	"The Medicine Man"	Richard H. Bartlett	Norman Jolley	November 8, 1958
6	"Hired Hand"	John Brahm	Lew Richards	November 15, 1958
7	"Kid on a Calico Horse"	Herschel Daugherty	E. Jack Neuman	November 22, 1958
8	"The Beast of Cimarron"	Abner Biberman	Norman Jolley	November 29, 1958
9	"A Respectable Girl"	Richard H. Bartlett	Leo Townsend	December 6, 1958
10	"The Blood Line"	Douglas Heyes	Douglas Heyes	December 13, 1958
11	"Cimarron Holiday"	Richard H. Bartlett	Norman Jolley	December 20, 1958
12	"McGowan's Debt"	Herschel Daugherty	James Charles Lynch	December 27, 1958
13	"The Bitter Lesson"	John Meredyth Lucas	Ernest Haycox	January 3, 1959
14	"A Legacy of Ossie Harper"	Jules Bricken	Ernest Kinoy Jameson Brewer	January 10, 1959
15	"Child of Fear"	Richard H. Bartlett	Virginia Spies	January 17, 1959
16	"Burn the Town Down"	Richard H. Bartlett	Ralph Winters	January 24, 1959
17	"Runaway Train"	Richard H. Bartlett	Norman Jolley	January 31, 1959
18	"The Beauty and the Sorrow"	Richard H. Bartlett	Halsted Welles	February 7, 1959
19	"Return of the Dead"	Richard H. Bartlett	Tom Seller	February 14, 1959
20	"Blind is the Killer"	John Meredyth Lucas	David Henry Lord	February 21, 1959
21	"The Unaccepted"	Jerry Hopper	Cyril Hume	February 28, 1959
22	"The Ratman"	Richard H. Bartlett	Richard Carlyle	March 7, 1959
23	"Have Sword --Will Duel"	Sidney Lanfield	Tom Seller	March 14, 1959
24	"Chinese Invasion"	Justus Addiss	William E. Raynor	March 21, 1959
25	"The Town is a Prisoner"	Richard H. Bartlett	Richard Morgan	March 28, 1959
26	"The Evil One"	Christian Nyby	David Boehm	April 4, 1959

== Home media ==
On March 6, 2012, Timeless Media Group released Cimarron City: The Complete Series on DVD in Region 1.
