= The Trail of '98 =

1928 film

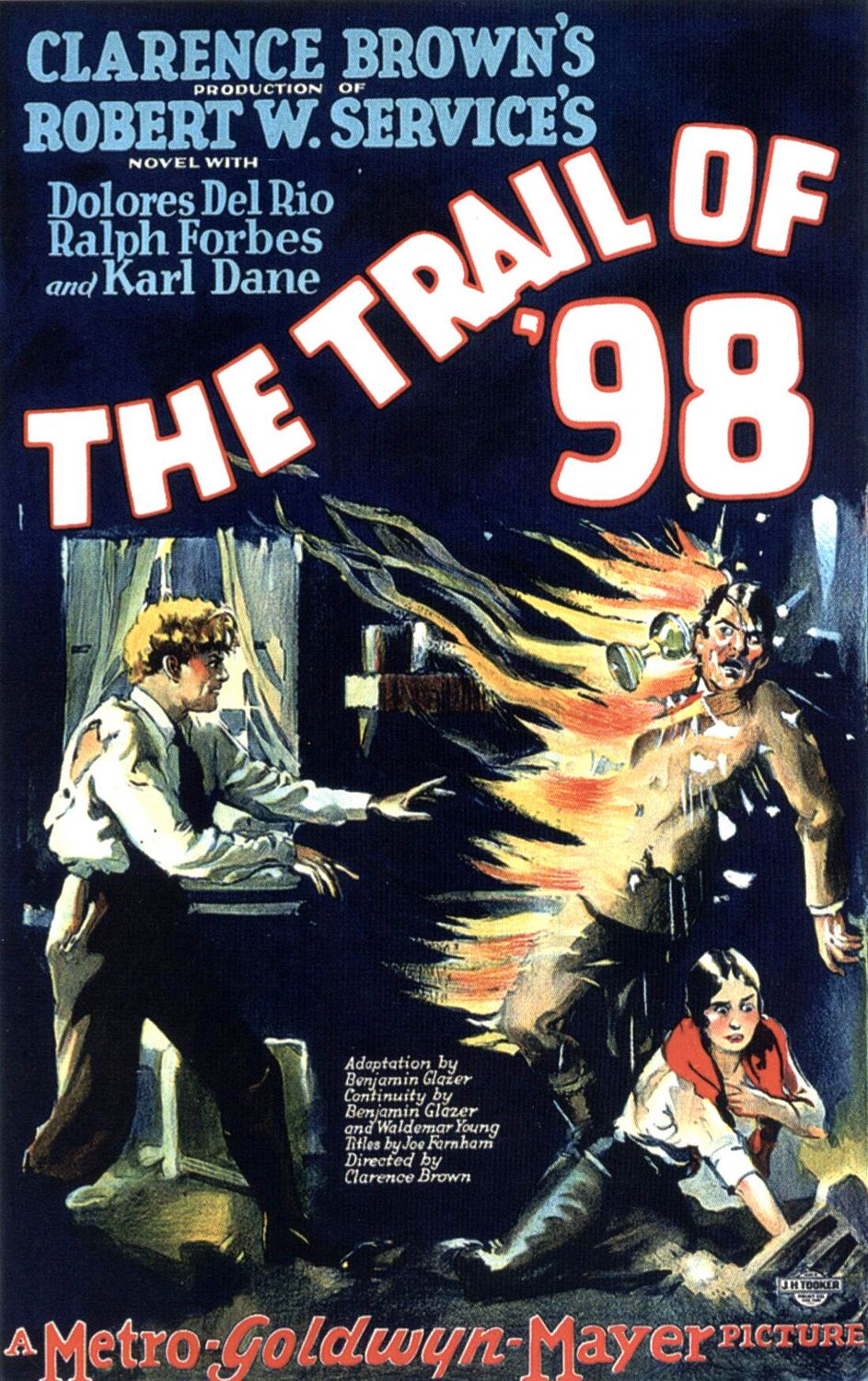
- Theatrical poster
- Directed by: Clarence Brown
- Written by: Joseph Farnham; Benjamin Glazer; Waldemar Young
- Based on: novel The Trail of '98; 1911 novel by Robert W. Service
- Produced by: Clarence Brown
- Starring: Dolores del Río; Ralph Forbes; Karl Dane; Harry Carey
- Cinematography: John F. Seitz
- Edited by: George Hively
- Music by: William Axt (uncredited); David Mendoza (uncredited)
- Distributed by: Metro-Goldwyn-Mayer
- Release date: March 20, 1928
- Running time: 87 minutes
- Country: United States
- Languages: Sound (Synchronized); English Intertitles
- Budget: $1.5m
- Box office: $1.6m

The Trail of '98 is a 1928 American synchronized sound action-adventure/drama film featuring Harry Carey and Dolores del Río about the Klondike Gold Rush. While the film has no audible dialog, it was released with a synchronized musical score, with sound effects using both the sound-on-disc and sound-on-film process. The film was originally released by Metro-Goldwyn-Mayer in a short-lived widescreen process called "Fantom Screen". The film is based on the 1910 novel of the same name, written by Robert W. Service.

== Plot ==
Soundtrack for The Trail Of '98
The complete synchronized soundtrack from surviving discs.

== Cast ==
- Dolores del Río as Berna
- Ralph Forbes as Larry
- Karl Dane as Lars Petersen
- Harry Carey as Jack Locasto
- Tully Marshall as Salvation Jim
- George Cooper as Samuel Foote (The Worm)
- Russell Simpson as Old Swede
- Emily Fitzroy as Mrs. Bulkey
- Tenen Holtz as Mr. Bulkey
- Cesare Gravina as Henry Kelland (Berna's Grandfather)
- Doris Lloyd as Locasto's procurer
- E. Alyn Warren as Engineer
- Johnny Downs as Mother's boy (as John Down)
- Ray Hallor as Brother Jim
- Ray Gallagher as Brother Joe
- Francis Ford as Gold Commissioner's assistant (uncredited)
- Roscoe Karns as Man on ship (uncredited)
- Jacques Tourneur as Extra (uncredited)
- Lou Costello performed uncredited stunts for Carey and possibly even del Rio.

== Music ==
The film features a theme song titled "I Found Gold When I Found You", by William Axt (music), and Hazel Mooney and Ev. E. Lyne (words).

== Production ==
The film was shot on location in Denver and The Great Divide, Colorado, Truckee, California, Dawson City, Yukon, Canada, and in various locations in Alaska, including Skagway and Copper River.

While shooting the rapids sequence, four stuntmen drowned in the Copper River, including Jerome Bauten, Howard Daughters, and Ray “Red” Thompson, who trained horses for cliff dives. Bobby Rose was among the few stuntmen who survived.

== Home media ==
A complete print of the film exists with a synchronized musical score and sound effects, and it became available on DVD as part of Warner Bros.'s manufacture-on-demand titles in March 2009.

== See also ==
- Harry Carey filmography
- List of early sound feature films (1926–1929)
