= Rogue River (film) =

1951 film

- Directed by: John Rawlins
- Written by: Louis Lantz
- Produced by: Irving D. Koppel; Frank Melford
- Starring: Rory Calhoun; Peter Graves; Frank Fenton
- Cinematography: Jack Greenhalgh
- Edited by: Terry O. Morse
- Music by: Paul Sawtell
- Production company: Ventura Pictures Corporation
- Distributed by: Eagle-Lion Classics
- Release date: February 15, 1951
- Running time: 81 minutes
- Country: United States
- Language: English

Rogue River is a 1951 American Western film directed by John Rawlins and starring Rory Calhoun, Peter Graves and Frank Fenton.

The film was shot in Cinecolor, a cheaper alternative to Technicolor. Location shooting took place in Grants Pass, Oregon.

== Cast ==
- Rory Calhoun as Ownie Rogers
- Peter Graves as Pete Dandridge
- Frank Fenton as Joe Dandridge
- Ralph Sanford as Max Bonner
- George Stern as H.P. Jackson
- Ellye Mravak as Judy Haven
- Roy Engel as Ed Colby
- Jane Liddell as Eileen Reid
- Bob Rose as Carter Laney
- Stephen Roberts as Mayor Arthur Judson
- Duke York as Bowers

== Bibliography ==
- Pitts, Michael R. Western Movies: A Guide to 5,105 Feature Films. McFarland, 2012.
