= The Vanishing American (1955 film) =

1955 film by Joseph Kane

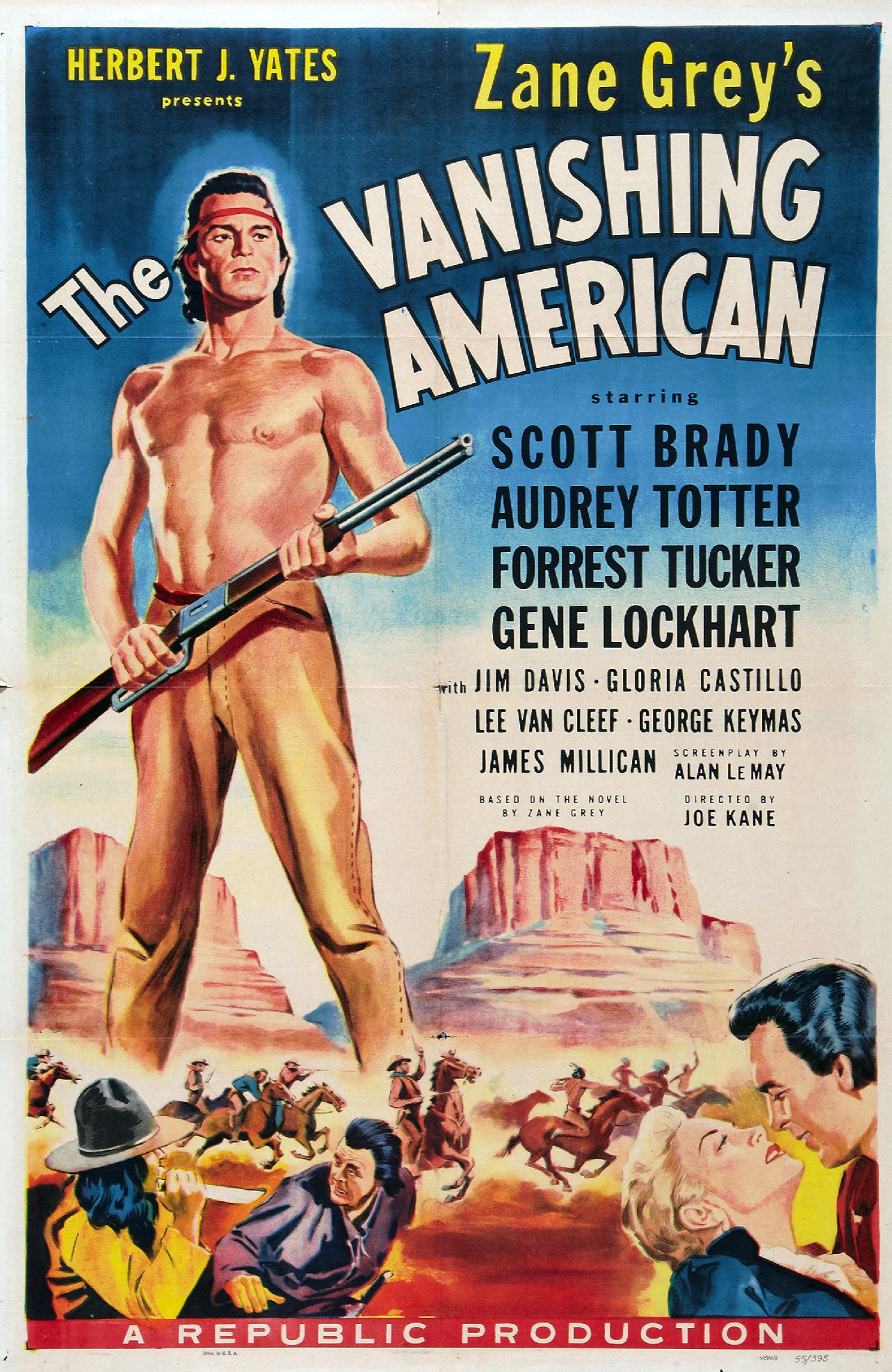
- Theatrical release poster
- Directed by: Joseph Kane
- Screenplay by: Alan Le May
- Based on: The Vanishing American by Zane Grey
- Produced by: Joseph Kane
- Starring: Scott Brady; Audrey Totter; Forrest Tucker; Gene Lockhart; Jim Davis; John Dierkes
- Cinematography: John L. Russell
- Edited by: Richard L. Van Enger
- Music by: R. Dale Butts
- Production company: Republic Pictures
- Distributed by: Republic Pictures
- Release date: November 17, 1955
- Running time: 90 minutes
- Country: United States
- Language: English

The Vanishing American is a 1955 American Western film directed by Joseph Kane and written by Alan Le May. It is based on the 1925 novel The Vanishing American by Zane Grey. The film stars Scott Brady, Audrey Totter, Forrest Tucker, Gene Lockhart, Jim Davis and John Dierkes. The film was released on November 17, 1955, by Republic Pictures.

== Plot ==
Marion Warner inherits a ranch from an uncle. Stranded in the desert, she encounters Blandy, a white man raised by Navajos who believes her land actually belongs to the Indians. A trading post owner, Morgan, aided by partner Blucher and hired guns Glendon and Lord, has been stealing from the Navajos and kidnapping women, including Yashi, who is held prisoner until Marion arranges her escape. An expert with a gun, Marion also rescues Etenia, the Navajo chief, after Morgan's men attempt to kill him.

Blandy is able to help Marion steal documents from Morgan's safe relating to the rightful ownership of the land. Blandy is taken captive and tortured as Marion realizes she has fallen in love with him. She sends for the law, Sheriff Joe Walker, then rescues him after he is taken prisoner. Walker then takes Morgan into custody as Blandy and Marion come to the aid of the Navajos and plan a future together.

== Cast ==
- Scott Brady as Blandy
- Audrey Totter as Marion Warner
- Forrest Tucker as Morgan
- Gene Lockhart as Blucher
- Jim Davis as Glendon
- John Dierkes as Freil
- Gloria Castillo as Yashi
- Julian Rivero as Etenia
- Lee Van Cleef as Jay Lord
- George Keymas as Coshanta
- Charles Stevens as Quah-Tan
- Jay Silverheels as Beeteia
- James Millican as Walker
- Glenn Strange as Beleanth
