= Oklahoma Territory (film) =

1960 film by Edward L. Cahn

- Directed by: Edward L. Cahn
- Written by: Orville H. Hampton
- Produced by: Robert E. Kent
- Starring: Bill Williams; Gloria Talbott
- Cinematography: Walter Strenge
- Edited by: Grant Whytock
- Music by: Albert Glasser
- Color process: Black and white
- Production company: Premium Pictures Inc.
- Distributed by: United Artists
- Release date: March 1960
- Running time: 67 minutes
- Country: United States
- Language: English

Oklahoma Territory is a 1960 American Western film directed by Edward L. Cahn and starring Bill Williams and Gloria Talbott.

== Plot ==
District attorney Temple Houston prosecutes a leading Indian chief (the father of his longtime friend Ruth) suspected of murder, despite the very real possibility of open tribe revolts. He reopens the case though when signs begin to point to a frame-up, putting his life and career on the line to find the real culprits.

== Cast ==
- Bill Williams as Temple Houston
- Gloria Talbott as Ruth Red Hawk
- Ted de Corsia as Buffalo Horn
- Grant Richards as Bigelow
- Walter Sande as Marshal Pete Rosslyn
- X Brands as Running Cloud
- Walter Baldwin as Ward Harlan
- Grandon Rhodes as George Blackwell
- John Cliff as Larkin (uncredited)

== See also ==
- List of American films of 1960
