= Torpedo Alley (film) =

1952 American film by Lew Landers

- Directed by: Lew Landers
- Written by: Warren Douglas; Samuel Roeca
- Produced by: John H. Burrows; Lindsley Parsons
- Starring: Mark Stevens; Dorothy Malone; Charles Winninger
- Cinematography: William A. Sickner
- Edited by: W. Donn Hayes
- Music by: Edward J. Kay
- Production company: Lindsley Parsons Picture Corporation
- Distributed by: Allied Artists Pictures
- Release date: December 19, 1952
- Running time: 84 minutes
- Country: United States
- Language: English

Torpedo Alley, also known as Down Periscope, is a 1952 American war film directed by Lew Landers and starring Mark Stevens, Dorothy Malone and Charles Winninger. It depicts a US Navy pilot rescued at sea by submarine before applying for submarine duty.

== Plot ==
When an American transport plane crashed, only the pilot, Lieutenant Bob Bingham, survived. Now he is drifting out to sea as a “shipwrecked man”. Fortunately for him, he is fished up by the crew of a submarine. Bingham's concern that he might be guilty of the deaths of his two comrades does not leave him in peace. After a while he decided to start a new professional life in the Navy. His goal is to become the commander of a submarine. At the training area he meets Commander Heywood and First Engineer Gates again, who saved him on the high seas. Bingham soon became friends with the nurse Susan Peabody.

In June 1950 the Korean War breaks out. In this, the United States supports the troops of South Korea. Heywood and Gates take command of a submarine. The crew also includes Bingham and his new friend Graham. As part of a special task force, Bingham and Gates are assigned to blow up a bridge. In the process of execution, two men are killed; Gates and Bingham are badly wounded. But the strategically important bridge could be destroyed.

Susan is a nurse on the hospital ship that recovered the two injured. Bingham realizes that she is very concerned about his health. Now he is convinced that not only does he love her, but she also loves him.

== Cast ==
- Mark Stevens as Lt. Bob Bingham
- Dorothy Malone as Lt. Susan Peabody
- Charles Winninger as Oliver J. Peabody
- Bill Williams as Lt. Tom Graham
- Douglas Kennedy as Lt. Dora Gates
- James Millican as Cmdr. Heywood
- William Henry as Instructor
- James Seay as Skipper
- Bob Rose as Anniston
- John Alvin as Professor
- Carleton Young as Psychiatrist
- Ralph Sanford as Charles Hedley
- Jean Willes as Peggy Moran
- William Boyett as Submariner (uncredited)

== See also ==
- Submarine films
