= Arvo Ojala =

Stuntman, marksman, technical advisor

- Born: February 21, 1920; Seattle, Washington, United States
- Died: July 1, 2005 (aged 85); Gresham, Oregon, United States
- Occupations: Technical advisor, marksman, stuntman
- Spouse: Doris Severson (1951 - 1978)

Arvo Oswald Ojala (February 21, 1920 – July 1, 2005) was an American technical advisor on the subject of quick-draw with a revolver. He also worked as an actor; his most famous role was that of the unnamed man shot by Marshal Matt Dillon in the opening sequences of the long-running television series Gunsmoke. As a joke on the producers, James Arness and Arvo actually did the opener once with Dillon falling to the ground.

== Biography ==
Born to Finnish immigrant parents as a young man, Ojala taught himself marksmanship and how to quick-draw a handgun while living on his father's ranch near Yakima, Washington. He said he sharpened his marksmanship skill by shooting the heads off rattlesnakes.

During the early 1950s, Ojala was living in Los Angeles, and working for the Hollywood film studios. "I watched these guys in Westerns," he told a reporter in 1957, "and realized that they were slow on the draw because the cylinder of their guns got stuck in their holsters. I decided the trick was to keep the cylinder free. I began making holsters in my garage. I lined each one with metal so a man could draw without any impediment. Then I began practicing myself. After a year or two I got it down so pat that today I can double draw in one-sixth of a second."

Ojala was "the genuine article" to those he tutored. His speed was clocked and verified a number of times. He could draw, fire, and hit the target in one-sixth of a second, faster than the eye can blink. His technique of cocking "in the holster" as he drew revolutionized the western and was shown in detail both by Henry Fonda in the western film The Tin Star and by John Payne in his series The Restless Gun. At the height of the TV Westerns, Ojala opened a "quick-draw" studio on the 8500 block of the Sunset Strip, next to the famous King's Cellar Liquor Store.

For further proof, Arvo would drop a silver dollar with his gun hand (right) from belt height, then draw and hit the coin before it could fall four inches. This was using "live", or full-power ammunition, not the wax bullets and quarter-loads used today in so-called "fast draw" competitions. In another exhibition, his opponent (using blanks) would face him with his pistol out of the holster and cocked, then nod as he simultaneously fired his revolver, while Arvo would draw and fire before the opponent could get a shot off. He never lost.

In August 1956, Ojala filed a patent application for his low-slung, metal-lined "Quick Draw Holster", and in April 1958, he was granted US Patent 2832519. His holster was publicly described in the New York Times on May 3, 1958. Disputes over similar holsters made by others resulted in a published court case—California Court of Appeals, OJALA v. BOHLIN, 178 Cal.App.2d 292 (1960) Docket No. 23844, February 24, 1960.

Among the TV and film stars that Ojala taught to shoot included James Arness, Robert Culp, James Garner, Kevin Kline, Paul Newman, Hugh O'Brian, Clint Walker, Marilyn Monroe and Thomas F. Wilson. He was a close personal friend to Audie Murphy with Murphy becoming Arvo's children's Godfather. He noted that most actors in westerns had, at best, a nodding acquaintance with handguns, especially the 1873 Colt .45s widely used in television and film because of their reliability. But, a gifted teacher, he said he could teach the necessary skills to anyone in two weeks. He also had speaking roles in many television series and films, to include the 1959 film The Oregon Trail, in which his expertise as a gunhandler, fastdraw artist, and instructor were shown. Usually, it was Arvo's hand that was actually shown in close-up when real speed and spinning skills were needed.

His wife Doris (née Seversen, 1925–1978) preceded him in death. He is survived by his children Valerie, Jon, Erikk, Inga, and Kym.

== Filmography ==
- The Oregon Trail (1959) as Ellis
- Two-Gun Lady (1955) as Henchman
- The McConnell Story (1955) as Cadet
