= John F. Warren =

American cinematographer (1909-2000)

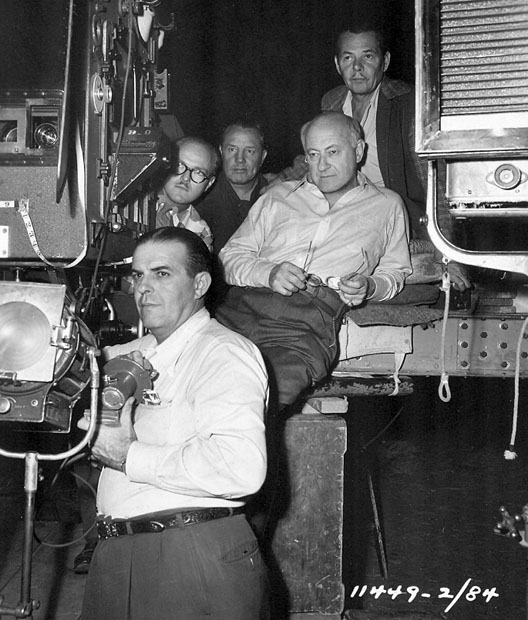
- Warren (left), next to and Cecil B. DeMille on the set of Samson and Delilah, c. 1948.
- Born: May 1, 1909; Boston, Massachusetts, U.S.
- Died: August 8, 2000 (aged 91); Camarillo, California, U.S.
- Occupation: Cinematographer
- Spouse: Rita Warren
- Children: 2

John F. Warren, ASC (May 1, 1909 – August 8, 2000) was an American cinematographer. He was nominated for an Academy Award for Best Cinematography (Black-and-White) for his debut film, The Country Girl (1954).

== Life and career ==
Born in Boston, Warren began his career as a clapper boy at Metro Pictures in New York City during the silent era. Moving to Hollywood in the 1930s, he was a camera assistant to George Barnes on the Alfred Hitchcock's Rebecca and Spellbound, among other titles. He was a camera operator for director Cecil B. DeMille, and shot additional photography on his Biblical epic The Ten Commandments (1956).

Warren's first film as cinematographer, George Seaton's The Country Girl (1954), earned him an Oscar nomination for Best Cinematography (Black-and-White). He subsequently shot a variety of productions, including the musical Anything Goes (1956), the air disaster drama Zero Hour! (1957), the B-movies Daughter of Dr. Jekyll (1957) and The Colossus of New York (1958), and the Cinerama travelogue film South Seas Adventure (1958).

From the late 1950s through the 1960s, Warren worked mostly in television, notably shooting 81 episodes of Alfred Hitchcock Presents (later retitled The Alfred Hitchcock Hour). He also shot Hitchcock's 1966 film Torn Curtain, after his usual cameraman Robert Burks proved unavailable. Warren utilized gray-colored gauze in front of the lens as a filter, to mute colors and give the film a more naturalistic look suitable to its Eastern Bloc Cold War atmosphere.

Warren also shot episodes of popular series such as Wagon Train, McHale's Navy, The Virginian, Ironside, and My Three Sons.

He was a member of the American Society of Cinematographers.

== Personal life ==
Warren married his wife Rita in 1929. The couple had two children.

=== Death ===
Warren died on August 8, 2000 in Camarillo, California, at the age of 91.

== Filmography ==
=== Film ===
Year	Title	Director	Notes
1954	The Country Girl	George Seaton	
1955	The Seven Little Foys	Melville Shavelson	
1956	Anything Goes	Robert Lewis	
1956	The Proud and Profane	George Seaton	
1956	The Ten Commandments	Cecil B. DeMille	Additional photography
1956	The Search for Bridey Murphy	Noel Langley	
1957	Beau James	Melville Shavelson	
1957	Daughter of Dr. Jekyll	Edgar G. Ulmer	
1957	Zero Hour!	Hall Bartlett	
1958	South Seas Adventure	Francis D. Lyon; Walter Thompson; Carl Dudley; Richard Goldstone; Basil Wrangell	
1958	The Colossus of New York	Eugène Lourié	
1959	The Cosmic Man	Herbert S. Greene	
1965	Dark Intruder	Harvey Hart	
1966	Torn Curtain	Alfred Hitchcock	
1967	The Love-Ins	Arthur Dreifuss	
1967	Tammy and the Millionaire	Leslie Goodwins; Sidney Miller; Ezra Stone	
1968	The Counterfeit Killer	Józef Lejtes	
1968	For Singles Only	Arthur Dreifuss	
1968	A Time to Sing	Arthur Dreifuss	
1968	The Young Runaways	Arthur Dreifuss	
1969	Angel, Angel, Down We Go	Robert Thom	
1970	The Wacky Zoo of Morgan City	Marvin J. Chomsky	

=== Television ===
Year	Title	Notes
1957–59	State Trooper	7 episodes
1957–62	Tales of Wells Fargo	13 episodes
1957–65	Alfred Hitchcock Presents	81 episodes
1958	Fireside Theatre	1 episode
1958	The Millionaire	1 episode
1958	Schlitz Playhouse of Stars	2 episodes
1958	Suspicion	2 episodes
1958–59	Cimarron City	3 episodes
1958–59	General Electric Theater	5 episodes
1958–59	Lux Video Theatre	2 episodes
1958–60	M Squad	4 episodes
1959	Johnny Staccato	3 episodes
1959	Mickey Spillane's Mike Hammer	5 episodes
1959–60	Markham	17 episodes
1959–64	Wagon Train	4 episodes
1960	Startime	1 episode
1960	Laramie	1 episode
1960	The Deputy	2 episodes
1960	Shotgun Slade	1 episode
1960–62	Thriller	8 episodes
1960–62	Checkmate	31 episodes
1960–62	The Tall Man	6 episodes
1961	Coronado 9	3 episodes
1961–62	87th Precinct	3 episodes
1961–63	Alcoa Theatre	6 episodes
1962	Bachelor Father	2 episodes
1963	Arrest and Trial	1 episode
1963	McHale's Navy	9 episodes
1964	The Virginian	1 episode
1964	Kraft Suspense Theatre	4 episodes
1964	Channing	2 episodes
1964–67	Bob Hope Presents the Chrysler Theatre	4 episodes
1965	Run for Your Life	1 episode
1965	Tammy	6 episodes
1966	Fame Is the Name of the Game	TV movie
1967	Ironside	2 episodes
1968	The Smugglers	TV movie
1968	The Name of the Game	1 episode
1969	Bracken's World	1 episode
1970	The Magical World of Disney	1 episode
1971–72	My Three Sons	16 episodes
1972	The Great Man's Whiskers	TV movie

== Awards and nominations ==
Award	Year	Category	Work	Result	Ref.
Academy Award	1955	Best Cinematography (Black-and-White)	The Country Girl	Nominated	
