= Lucky Devils (1933 film) =

1933 film by Ralph Ince

- Directed by: Ralph Ince
- Written by: Agnes Christine Johnston; Ben Markson
- Story by: Casey Robinson; Bob Rose
- Produced by: David O. Selznick
- Starring: William Boyd; Bruce Cabot
- Cinematography: J. Roy Hunt
- Edited by: Frederic Knudtson; Jack Kitchin
- Production company: RKO Radio Pictures
- Distributed by: RKO Radio Pictures
- Release date: February 3, 1933
- Running time: 60-70 minutes
- Country: United States
- Language: English
- Budget: $117,000
- Box office: $285,000

Lucky Devils is a 1933 American Pre-Code action film about group of Hollywood stuntmen and their dangerous daredevil stunt work, starring William Boyd and Bruce Cabot, and features an early appearance by Lon Chaney Jr.

== Cast ==
- William Boyd as Skipper Clark (as Bill Boyd)
- Bruce Cabot as Happy White
- William Gargan as Bob Hughes
- William Bakewell as Slugger Jones
- Lon Chaney Jr. as Frankie (as Creighton Chaney)
- Bob Rose as Rusty (as Robert Rose)
- Dorothy Wilson as Fran Whitley
- Julie Haydon as Doris Jones
- Sylvia Picker as Midge
- Gladden James as Neville Silverman
- Edwin Stanley as Mr. Spence
- Roscoe Ates as Gabby (as Rosco Ates)
- Phyllis Fraser as Toots
- Betty Furness as Ginger
- Alan Roscoe as Mr. Hacket
- Rochelle Hudson as Movie Star

== Production ==
The film is based on an original story written by real-life stuntman Bobby Rose and is noteworthy for being produced by David O. Selznick and Merian C. Cooper, who would work together on 1933's groundbreaking King Kong.

== Reception ==
The film ended up making a profit of $65,000.
