= The Daughter of Dr. Jekyll =

1957 film by Edgar George Ulmer

Daughter of Dr. Jekyll
- Film poster
- Directed by: Edgar G. Ulmer
- Screenplay by: Jack Pollexfen
- Story by: Based on a story by Robert Louis Stevenson
- Produced by: Jack Pollexfen
- Starring: John Agar; Gloria Talbott; Arthur Shields
- Cinematography: John F. Warren
- Edited by: Holbrook N. Todd
- Music by: Melvyn Lenard
- Production company: Film Venturers
- Distributed by: Allied Artists
- Release date: 28 July 1957
- Running time: 71 minutes
- Country: United States
- Language: English

Daughter of Dr. Jekyll is a low-budget black-and-white 1957 American horror film produced by Jack Pollexfen, directed by Edgar G. Ulmer and released by Allied Artists. The film is a variation on the 1886 gothic novella Strange Case of Dr. Jekyll and Mr. Hyde by Robert Louis Stevenson. It stars Gloria Talbott, John Agar and Arthur Shields. In the film, Janet Smith (Gloria Talbott) learns that she is not only the daughter of the infamous Dr. Henry Jekyll, but is convinced by her guardian, Dr. Lomas (Arthur Shields), that she has inherited her father's transformative condition. Janet begins to believe that she turns into a monster after two local women are found horribly killed and nearly takes her own life because of it. However, all is not what it seems.

Daughter of Dr. Jekyll was released in theaters in the US in July 1957 by Allied Artists on a double bill with The Cyclops (1957).

== Plot ==
In the mid-1910s, Janet Smith and fiancé George Hastings arrive at the English manor house that Janet will inherit the next day, when she turns 21. They meet Mrs. Merchant, the housekeeper; Jacob, the groundskeeper; and Maggie, Janet's personal maid. Oddly, Maggie is frightened and in a hurry to get home before the moon rises. Janet and George also meet Dr. Lomas, Janet's soon-to-be ex-guardian.

Janet surprises Lomas by revealing that she and George have decided to marry as soon as possible. Lomas says that their decision is "rash and ill-advised," but then announces that in addition to the house, Janet is inheriting a "sizable fortune" and a huge estate. He also says, ominously, that he has another inheritance to explain in the morning.

The next morning, Janet and George discover a hidden laboratory in the house. When they ask Lomas about it, he refuses to say anything until George leaves the room. George does, but when Janet returns from the lab, she tells him that the wedding is off because Lomas has told her that she is the daughter of the werewolf Dr. Henry Jekyll. After Lomas takes them to the family crypt to see Jekyll's tomb, Janet says that she fears passing on "this madness" to her and George's future children. When George asks if that is possible, Lomas says that there is no proof one way or the other.

Lomas hypnotizes Janet that night under the pretense of checking her for shock. Before Janet goes to bed, Maggie tells her that tomorrow night's full moon marks the night that "the monster Jekyll rises from his tomb." Janet has a nightmare in which she sees a monster-woman kill another woman. Once awake, she finds blood on her hands and nightdress, and when she looks in the mirror, she sees the monster-woman looking back.

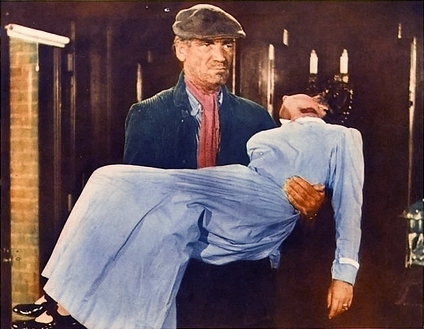
Colored publicity shot featuring John Dierkes and Molly McCard.

Merchant serves breakfast the next morning, complaining that Maggie and Jacob are late for work. Jacob then appears, carrying Maggie's body. She was killed on her way home last night, according to Jacob, by a werewolf. That night, the night of the full moon, Lomas doses Janet with brandy- and drug-laced milk before she goes to bed. Janet has second, longer nightmare, in which the monster-woman kills Lucy in the woods, while leaving the young man she is with unharmed. Janet awakens and again finds blood on herself.

In the morning, Jacob glares accusingly at Janet as he says, "We have found Lucy. With her throat torn out. Torn out by her!" Merchant resigns, too afraid to stay in the manor house any longer. Janet is by now in deep distress. She begs George to lock her up or put her "in a nuthouse," then hysterically cries, "If you love me, please kill me," threatening that if he will not, she will. George puts her back to bed, but she slips away. As they search for her, Lomas dismisses George's worries about Janet killing herself, saying that most suicide threats are "just talk." They find Janet at the family crypt, Jacob sitting nearby sharpening a wooden stake.

Lomas hypnotizes Janet again and leads her back to the crypt. George follows, unseen, unheard. Lomas tells Janet that she will kill another woman that night and then hang herself over her father's tomb in regret. As George watches, Lomas transforms into a werewolf. They fight, the werewolf knocks George unconscious, then goes to the village and kills a woman as she dresses.

Armed village men shoot the werewolf and chase it toward the crypt. George rouses Janet from her trance and explains that Lomas is the werewolf, not her, and that he is framing Janet, just as he framed her father, because he wants the estate for himself. While the wounded werewolf and George fight in the crypt, Jacob skewers the werewolf with the wooden stake. The werewolf reverts to Lomas as it dies.

== Cast ==
- Gloria Talbott as Janet Smith
- John Agar as George Hastings
- Arthur Shields as Dr. Lomas
- John Dierkes as Jacob
- Molly McCard as Maggie
- Martha Wentworth as Mrs. Merchant
- Marjorie Stapp as Woman Getting Dressed
- Rita Green as Lucy
- Marel Page as Young Man in Woods

== Production ==
Production of the film began in early November 1956, about eight months before its release. It was filmed in widescreen format with an aspect ratio of 1.85:1. Gloria Talbott said in an interview that the actual shooting time was "something like five to seven days" and that most of the filming took place "not on a stage, but in a house" on 6th Street in Los Angeles, near Hancock Park. She said that passing traffic can occasionally be seen through a window in the background of interior shots. The car George Hastings (John Agar) is seen driving to the manor house at the beginning of the film is a 1912 Ford Model T.

Daughter of Dr. Jekyll has a virtually identical prologue and epilogue. In the beginning, after a voice-over informs viewers that Dr. Henry Jekyll is dead, the camera cuts to a werewolf, sitting in a smoky lab, who cackles "Are you sure?" in what sounds like a high-pitched woman's voice. At the end, after the werewolf is killed, the same scene is repeated, but this time "Are you sure?" is asked in a more masculine-sounding voice. British film scholar Phil Hardy speculates that this was done in the belief that Daughter of Dr. Jekyll would be the first film in a series. It was not.

In the fight scene between George and the werewolf Dr. Lomas, uncredited stuntman Ken Terrell stood in for Arthur Shields. The monster-woman version of Janet during the nightmare scenes was played by an unnamed stunt double. To produce an unreal effect during the nightmares, Edgar G. Ulmer set the action in a wooded region that had recently been burned, then filmed it using ultraviolet film. Reflecting the film's low budget, screams heard during the nightmares came from the "convenient and valuable resource known as the Sound Effects Library."

Daughter of Dr. Jekyll is one of 35 films thematically related to the Robert Louis Stevenson novella Strange Case of Dr Jekyll and Mr Hyde and released between 1908 and 2005, according to a filmography compiled by Dr. Michael Delahoyd of Washington State University. It is one of only three werewolf movies made in the US during the 1950s, the other two being The Werewolf (1956) and I Was a Teenage Werewolf (1957).

== Release ==
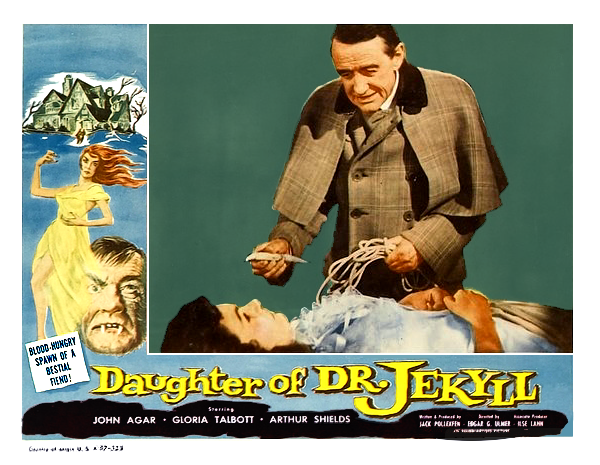
Colorized lobby card featuring Gloria Talbott and Arthur Shields

Daughter of Dr. Jekyll was released in the US on July 28, 1957 by Allied Artists as the second half of a double feature with Bert I. Gordon's The Cyclops (1957), in which Talbott also starred. The movie opened over a period of years in different countries: in Mexico during 1957, in Italy in 1959 and in Austria and West Germany in 1963. The film was released to theaters at unspecified dates in Belgium, France, Brazil, Greece, Serbia and Spain. It was re-released to US theaters in 1964, two years after it had been syndicated to television by Allied Artists as part of a 22-film package called "Sci-Fi for the 60s."

Allied Artists distributed the film in the US for its initial release in 1957 and again upon its re-release in 1964. Allied Artists de Mexico distributed the film to theaters there, while Mercator Filmverleih Boho Gaus handled it in Germany.

The television release was somewhat unusual as the film's running time of 67, 69 or 71 minutes, depending on which version was used, was considered to be too short for "late night time slots." As a result, the film was expanded to approximately 75 minutes by double-printing "some of the film's frames to stretch out the action" and lengthening Janet's nightmares "with footage taken from Frankenstein 1970 (1958)."

Daughter of Dr. Jekyll has been available for home viewing for a number of years. Fox Video, Key Video and World Beyond Video all released the film on VHS in the US, although release dates have not been established. DVDs of the film were put out in the US by All-Day Entertainment in 2000 and by Image Entertainment in 2003. Outside the US, DVDs of the movie were released by Punto Zero in Italy in 2008, and in 2009 by BAC Films in France and L'Atelier 13 in Spain. In 2012, a DVD version was released by an unspecified company in Germany. Scenes, trailers and clips from the film are featured in the 1991 VHS documentary Wolfman Chronicles and in two episodes of the TV series 100 Years of Horror - "Dr. Jekyll and Mr. Hyde" and "Girl Ghouls," both from the series' first season in 1996.

== Reception ==
Reviewers seem to have not been overwhelmed by the quality of the film at the time of its release. BoxOffice magazine summarized reviews in its standing feature "Review Digest" in the issue of 26 October 1957. Harrison's Reports, Film Daily, The Hollywood Reporter, Parent's Magazine and The New York Daily News all called the film "fair." Variety and BoxOffice itself rated it as "poor." About two months earlier, BoxOffice suggested to theater owners in its regular "Exploitips" feature that to drum up business, "At the curb in front of the theatre, have an ambulance bearing a sign: 'For the convenience of those who are overcome by the dual chiller-thrillers,'" a reference to the pairing of The Cyclops and Daughter of Dr. Jekyll.

Later critics have tended to focus on the film's inconsistencies and shortcomings. American critic Andrew Sarris notes that the film has a "scenario so atrocious that it takes forty minutes to establish that the daughter of Dr. Jekyll is indeed the daughter of Dr. Jekyll." Hardy calls the film "bizarre" and "the most unorthodox treatment of Stevenson's theme to date" (i.e., 1985) but also says that "Ulmer's direction is as hypnotic as ever but producer Pollexfen's script leaves him little room for genuine creativity." Ken Hanke, film critic for the MountainXpress on-line newspaper, notes in a 2014 review of the movie, then being shown as part of a film series, that while "there are obvious attempts of someone making the best film possible given the script and budget," the film makes little sense. For example, he notes that "It somehow manages to confuse Mr. Hyde with a werewolf [and] comes up with the screwy idea that being a drug-induced monster could be an inheritable trait." Likewise, American sci-fi film scholar Bill Warren points out the inconsistency of having the werewolf killed with a stake through the heart "like a vampire." He also writes that "To make a Jekyll-Hyde movie and leave out Hyde seems perverse."

Other critics, however, have more deeply explored the subtext of the film. Robert Singer suggests in a book chapter titled "Nothing to Hyde: Reading The Daughter of Dr. Jekyll" that the film "may be read as a critically significant text within the melodramatic crisis of female identity cinema of the 1950s," with Janet treated simultaneously as a child and an adult, being "dressed, undressed, put to sleep, given pills, hypnotized and, when all else fails, she is nearly led to suicide." Singer describes the film as "an identity quest set in a dark fairy tale" and calls George "an oafish white knight" who "in fairy tale fashion, saves his princess, the innocent persecuted heroine."

Similarly, Craig makes note of the sexual and patriarchal undertones of Daughter of Dr. Jekyll that are reflected in Janet, who by the end of the film is legally an adult (i.e., age 21) and very soon to be married. He writes that "Janet's first 'victims' are young women, easily seen as sexual rivals, reinforcing the notion that this 'alter ego' of hers is fueled in part by sexual desire suppressed." Moreover, "she readily believes herself literally cursed by the 'sins of the father.' This notion follows the time-honored patriarchal script in which the female is blamed for the sins of the male, even unto potential self-destruction."

Stars Talbott and Agar appear to have disagreed about the worth of the movie, speaking about it in separate interviews. Talbott said that "I was amazingly surprised at it. I didn't think it was going to be anything - it was another of those 'wham-bam-thank-you-ma'am' shoots - and yet it turned out to have a lot more content than I might have hoped." Agar, though, said that "I did that picture strictly for the bread. I didn't fluff it - I did the best I could with what I had to work with - but it wasn't my cup of tea. I just didn't believe it."

Nonetheless, despite its shortcomings, some critics still find the movie enjoyable, calling it "immensely silly" and "more amusing than anything" as well as "delightfully daffy" and "an awful lot of fun."

== See also ==
- The Son of Dr. Jekyll
