= John Dierkes =

American actor (1905–1975)

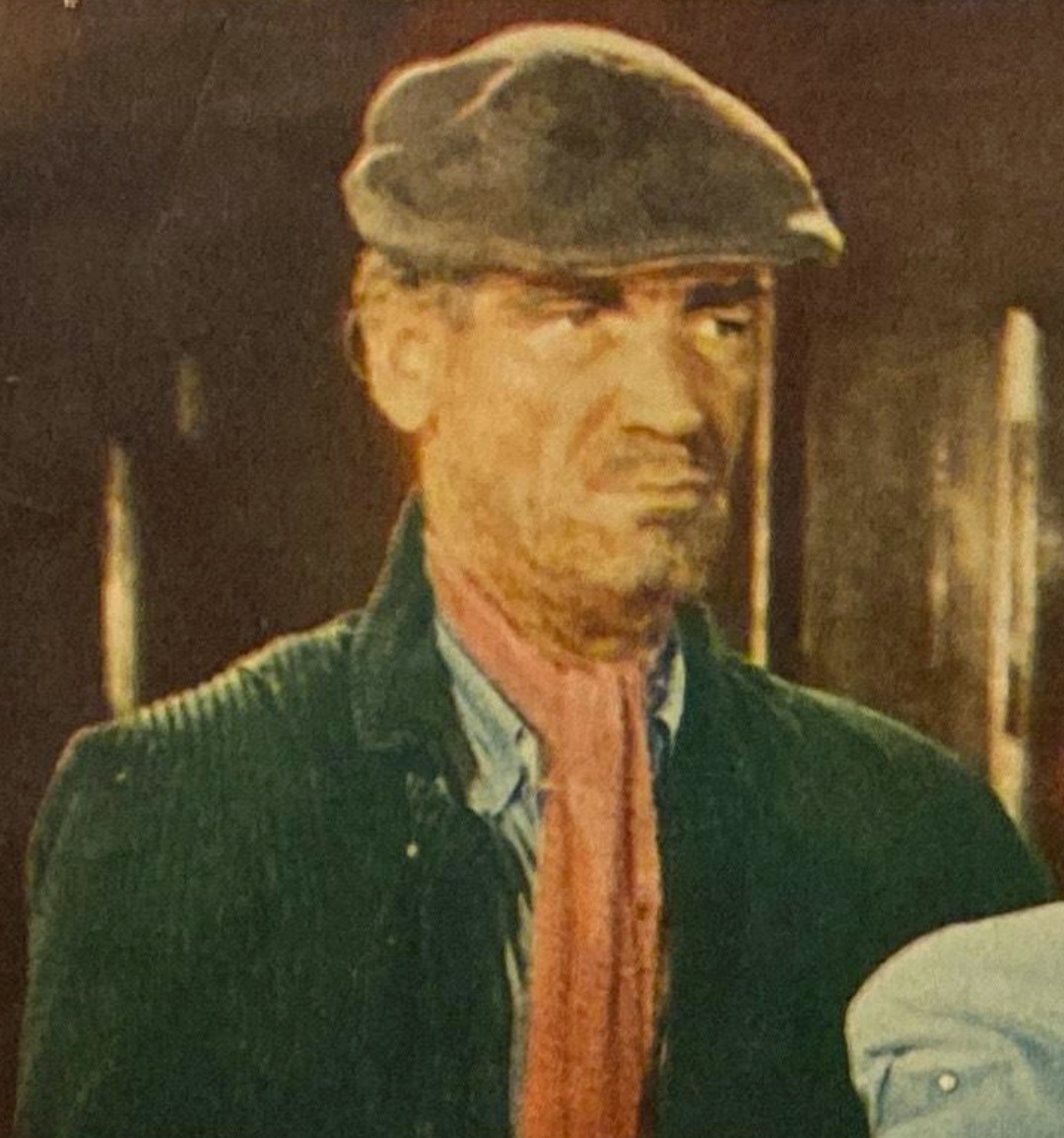
- Dierkes in The Daughter of Dr. Jekyll (1957)
- Born: February 10, 1905; Cincinnati, Ohio, U.S.
- Died: January 8, 1975 (aged 69); Los Angeles, California, U.S.
- Education: Brown University
- Occupation: Actor
- Years active: 1948–1973
- Spouse: Cynthia Dierkes
- Children: 4

John Dierkes (February 10, 1905 – January 8, 1975) was an American actor who appeared in a number of classic Hollywood films. Before becoming an actor, he had been an economist.

== Life and career ==
Dierkes was born on February 10, 1905, in Cincinnati, Ohio. He attended Brown University and subsequently went to work as an economist for the United States Department of State. In 1941 he joined the Red Cross and served in Britain during World War II. There he met director John Huston who recommended that he try Hollywood after the war. Instead, Dierkes went to work for the U.S. Treasury Department which coincidentally sent him to Hollywood to function as technical advisor for the film To the Ends of the Earth (1948) and Orson Welles cast him as Ross in his version of Macbeth in the same year. Welles used Dierkes again in his Touch of Evil (1958). He married Cynthia Dierkes and they had two daughters and two sons.

Because of his appearance and very tall frame (6 ft 6 in), Dierkes enjoyed a long career as a character actor, often portraying either villains or soldiers. One noteworthy performance cast Dierkes as the compassionate and caring scientist Dr. Chapman in the 1951 film The Thing from Another World which remains a mainstay science fiction classic of the 1950s. His performance provided sanity and calm amid the tension and chills of the action thriller. Although playing against type, his low tone and measured monotone dialogue was a good counter to the rapid and chaotic overlapping dialogue throughout the movie, giving brief pauses between each actor's lines as the tension in each scene increased. In 1951 he played a soldier next to Audie Murphy in the classic film, Red Badge of Courage, using that same soft tone. His character becomes delusional from battle injuries and dies. In the 1953 film Shane, Dierkes portrays the callous Morgan Ryker with great effect, director George Stevens making good use of Dierkes' craggy features. Alongside his 'brother' Rufus (Emile Meyer) and Jack Wilson (Jack Palance) he completes a trio of villains who are dispatched by the title character, Shane, in the final bar room shootout. One of his more memorable scenes is in the 1960 film, The Alamo. Dierkes portrays a Tennessean named Jocko, who is torn between leaving before the attack to care for his blind wife, or staying to support the Texans' cause. Understanding that if Jocko stays to fight she will likely be widowed, Jocko's wife coaxes him to stay and defend the fort, despite her disability.

His other film credits included The Naked Jungle (1954), The Raid (1954), Jubal (1956), The Daughter of Dr. Jekyll (1957), Blood Arrow (1958), The Left Handed Gun (1958), The Buccaneer (1958), The Hanging Tree (1959), The Oregon Trail (1959), One-Eyed Jacks (1961), The Premature Burial (1962), X: The Man with the X-ray Eyes (1963), The Haunted Palace (1963), The Omega Man (1971) and Rage (1972).

He appeared on the television screen on Gunsmoke, as "Mr. Rydell" in the 1956 episode "The Roundup" (S2E4) and as "Ace" in the 1957 episode "Gone Straight" (S2E20) and as "Indian" in the 1971 episode "My Brother's Keeper" (S17E10).

Dierkes died on January 8, 1975, from emphysema in Los Angeles, California.

== Partial filmography ==
- Macbeth (1948) – Ross
- Three Husbands (1950) – Night Court Judge (uncredited)
- The Thing from Another World (1951) – Dr. Chapman (uncredited)
- The Red Badge of Courage (1951) – Jim Conklin – the Tall Soldier
- Silver City (1951) – Arnie
- The Sellout (1952) – Big Jake (uncredited)
- Les Misérables (1952) – Bosun (uncredited)
- Plymouth Adventure (1952) – Greene (uncredited)
- A Perilous Journey (1953) – First Mate
- Shane (1953) – Morgan Ryker
- The Vanquished (1953) – General Morris
- Abbott and Costello Meet Dr. Jekyll and Mr. Hyde (1953) – Batley
- The Moonlighter (1953) – Sheriff Daws
- Gun Fury (1953) – Sheepherder (uncredited)
- The Naked Jungle (1954) – Gruber
- Prince Valiant (1954) – Sir Tristram (uncredited)
- The Desperado (1954) – Police Sergeant
- Silver Lode (1954) – Blacksmith (uncredited)
- The Raid (1954) – Cpl. Fred Deane
- Passion (1954) – Escobar (uncredited)
- Hell's Outpost (1954) – Swede – the Cook (uncredited)
- Timberjack (1955) – Sheriff (uncredited)
- The Road to Denver (1955) – Sheriff Dedrick (uncredited)
- Not as a Stranger (1955) – Bursar
- Betrayed Women (1955) – Cletus Ballard
- The Vanishing American (1955) – Freil
- Jubal (1956) – Carson – Horgan Rider
- The Fastest Gun Alive (1956) – Walter Hutchins (uncredited)
- Friendly Persuasion (1956) – Farmer (uncredited)
- The Halliday Brand (1957) – Reverend
- Duel at Apache Wells (1957) – Bill Sowers
- The Guns of Fort Petticoat (1957) – Texas Storekeeper (uncredited)
- The Buckskin Lady (1957) – Swanson
- The Daughter of Dr. Jekyll (1957) – Jacob
- Valerie (1957) – Bartender (uncredited)
- Death in Small Doses (1957) – 'Shug' Grandon (uncredited)
- The Rawhide Trail (1958) – Hangman
- Touch of Evil (1958) – Policeman (uncredited)
- Blood Arrow (1958) – Ez
- The Left Handed Gun (1958) – McSween
- The Buccaneer (1958) – Deacon
- The Hanging Tree (1959) – Society Red
- The Oregon Trail (1959) – Gabe Hastings
- The Alamo (1960) – Jocko Robertson
- One-Eyed Jacks (1961) – Chet
- The Comancheros (1961) – Ranger Bill Larsen (uncredited)
- The Premature Burial (1962) – Sweeney
- Convicts 4 (1962) – Cell Block Guard (uncredited)
- X: The Man with the X-ray Eyes (1963) – Preacher (uncredited)
- The Haunted Palace (1963) – Benjamin West / Jacob West
- Johnny Cool (1963) – Cripple
- The Cardinal (1963) – Redneck (uncredited)
- The Omega Man (1971) – Family Member #2
- Buck and the Preacher (1972) – Townsman in Opening Credits (uncredited)
- Rage (1972) – Bill Parker
- Oklahoma Crude (1973) – Farmer
