= The Oregon Trail (1959 film) =

1959 film

- Directed by: Gene Fowler Jr.
- Screenplay by: Louis Vittes; Gene Fowler Jr.
- Story by: Louis Vittes
- Produced by: Richard Einfeld
- Starring: Fred MacMurray; William Bishop; Nina Shipman
- Cinematography: Kay Norton
- Edited by: Betty Steinberg
- Music by: Paul Dunlap
- Color process: Color by Deluxe
- Production company: Associated Producers
- Distributed by: 20th Century Fox
- Release date: September 1959
- Running time: 86 minutes
- Country: United States
- Language: English
- Budget: $300,000

The Oregon Trail is a 1959 American CinemaScope and DeLuxe Color Western film directed by Gene Fowler Jr. and starring Fred MacMurray, William Bishop and Nina Shipman. The film's sets were designed by the art directors John B. Mansbridge and Lyle R. Wheeler.

== Plot ==
In the midst of the Oregon boundary dispute with British North America, President James K. Polk (1845–1849) is secretly sending military agents, disguised as pioneers, out west on the Oregon Trail so that they can protect American settlers in the event of war. Rumors of this conspiracy reach James Gordon Bennett Sr., publisher of the New York Herald. He assigns one of his reporters, Neal Harris, to go on the Oregon Trail himself and find out the truth. On the trail, Harris befriends the eccentric Zachariah Garrison, who is bringing pots with apple tree saplings to plant in Oregon. Harris clashes with George Wayne, the leader of the wagon train, and secretly in command of Polk's agents; they become involved in a love triangle with a young pioneer woman named Prudence Cooper.

After they survive various hardships on the trail, Harris discovers who Wayne really is, and declares that he will expose Polk's military buildup. Wayne tries to have Harris arrested, but he escapes, hoping to send a dispatch back to James Bennett in New York. Harris reaches Fort Laramie (in present-day Wyoming) shortly before Wayne and his men arrive at the fort. After arriving, Wayne discovers that his secret mission has become moot due to the signing of the Oregon Treaty and the commencement of the Mexican–American War. Not knowing this and still fearing arrest, Harris pays a mountain man and fur trapper named Gabe Hastings to take him to hide out in a nearby Arapaho village.

However, it turns out that Hastings and the Arapaho are hostile to the Americans, and are planning to attack the fort. But Harris escapes with the help of Hastings' beautiful half-Arapaho daughter, Shona, who has fallen in love with Harris. They reach Fort Laramie in time to warn the troops based there of the impending attack. The film concludes with a ferocious, climactic battle between the Americans and the Arapaho. In the end, the Arapaho retreat, but dozens on both sides have been killed, including Zachariah Garrison. Harris resigns his job as a reporter so that he can continue on to Oregon with Garrison's apple trees. Shona renounces her people because of the terrible bloodshed, and joins Harris. Prudence ends up with George Wayne, who is now heading south to join the war against Mexico.

== Cast ==
- Fred MacMurray as Neal Harris
- William Bishop as Capt. George Wayne
- Nina Shipman as Prudence Cooper
- Gloria Talbott as Shona Hastings
- Henry Hull as George Seton
- John Carradine as Zachariah Garrison
- John Dierkes as Gabe Hastings
- Roxene Wells as Flossie Shoemaker
- Elizabeth Patterson as Maria Cooper
- Gene N. Fowler as Richard Cooper
- James Bell as Jeremiah Cooper
- John Slosser as Johnny
- Ralph Sanford as John Decker
- Sherry Spalding as Lucy
- Tex Terry as Brizzard
- Ollie O'Toole as James Gordon Bennett Sr.
- Arvo Ojala as Ellis
- Ed Wright as Jesse
- Lumsden Hare as Sir Richard Wallingham, British Ambassador (uncredited)
- Addison Richards as President James Polk (uncredited)

== Production ==
The film was shot in May 1959. It was financed by Robert L. Lippert who made B films for Fox, The Oregon Trail was more expensive than most of his films, being budgeted at around $300,000. Lippert said the film "won't lose" but could "have used another $100,000."

Gene Fowler had made a number of Westerns for Lippert. He remembered The Oregon Trail as being "a son of a bitch – Lippert really screwed that one up. He made a bet with Spyros Skouras that he could make a big outdoor Western without ever leaving the Fox lot and like an idiot I agreed to direct it."

== Reception ==
The Los Angeles Times called the film "below standard."

== Bibliography ==
- Pitts, Michael R. Western Movies: A Guide to 5,105 Feature Films. McFarland, 2012.
