= An Eye for an Eye (1966 film) =

1966 film by Michael D. Moore

- Theatrical release poster
- Directed by: Michael D. Moore (as Michael Moore)
- Written by: Bing Russell; Sumner Williams
- Produced by: Caroll Case
- Starring: Robert Lansing; Pat Wayne; Slim Pickens; Gloria Talbott
- Cinematography: Lucien Ballard
- Edited by: Bob Wyman
- Music by: Raoul Kraushaar
- Production company: Circle Productions
- Distributed by: Embassy Pictures
- Release date: June 1966
- Running time: 106 minutes
- Country: United States
- Language: English

An Eye for an Eye (also known as Talion) is a 1966 American Pathécolor Western film directed by Michael D. Moore and starring Robert Lansing, Pat Wayne, Slim Pickens and Gloria Talbott. It was written by Bing Russell and Sumner Williams.

== Plot ==
Talion is an ex-bounty hunter turned homesteader who, after his ranch is burned to the ground and his wife and child are murdered, meets up with and hires bounty hunter Benny Wallace to track down the killer, Ike Slant. Along the way, they befriend entrepreneur Brian Quince, his daughter Bri Quince and her brother "Jo-Hi".

Brian, mistaking the two bounty hunters for lawmen, provides them with information to help them track down Ike Slant and his accomplices, the Beetson brothers. During an ambush on Ike's camp, Ike shoots Talion's gun hand while Wallace is able to gun down both Beetson brothers. Without Talion's support, Ike is able to deliver a head wound to Wallace before escaping on horseback.

The two wounded bounty hunters are thus forced to rely upon each other, leading them to resolutely combine into one single, unstoppable killing machine. Talion facilitates this by training Wallace, who cannot see but can still shoot straight, to visualize a clock in his head so that Talion can guide his aim using clock numbers as directions.

Wallace, it turns out, is the son of the famous Pat Garrett, who took down Billy the Kid. It is also revealed that Talion killed Slant's younger brother before the movie started and that Ike's slaying of Talion's son and wife were an act of vengeance. During the final shootout, Wallace/Garrett Jr. and Ike Slant are both killed. Despite a developing romantic relationship with Bri, Talion rides off, leaving her behind so that she does not meet the same fate as his late wife.

== Cast ==
- Robert Lansing as Talion
- Pat Wayne as Benny Wallace
- Slim Pickens as Ike Slant
- Gloria Talbott as Bri Quince
- Paul Fix as Brian Quince
- Strother Martin as Trumbull
- Clint Howard as Jo-Hi Quince, Brian's son
- Rance Howard as Harry
- Henry Wills as Charley Beetson
- Jerry Gatling as Jones Beetson

== Reception ==
Boxoffice wrote: "Screen writers Bing Russell and Sumner Williams veer from the familiar western formula by placing a pair of bounty hunters (Robert Lansing and Pat Wayne) in an unusual predicament. ... Lansing gives a deadpan, steely-eyed portrayal as the older "Eye for an Eye" avenger. Pickens is a mean and ornery villain and young Wayne acceptably plays Lansing's resolute partner."

Variety wrote: "Bing Russell and Sumner Williams' script has insufficient action, but plenty of dramatic content. Director Michael Moore, evidently not at home in the western genre, keeps his actors immobile for too long, and lets dialog take precedence over action."

Hal Erickson in The New York Times wrote: "You know that the filmmakers aren't kidding around when, in the very first scene, outlaw Slim Pickens puts a bullet into a squalling baby!"

== See also ==
- List of American films of 1966
