= Ralph Sanford =

American actor (1899–1963)

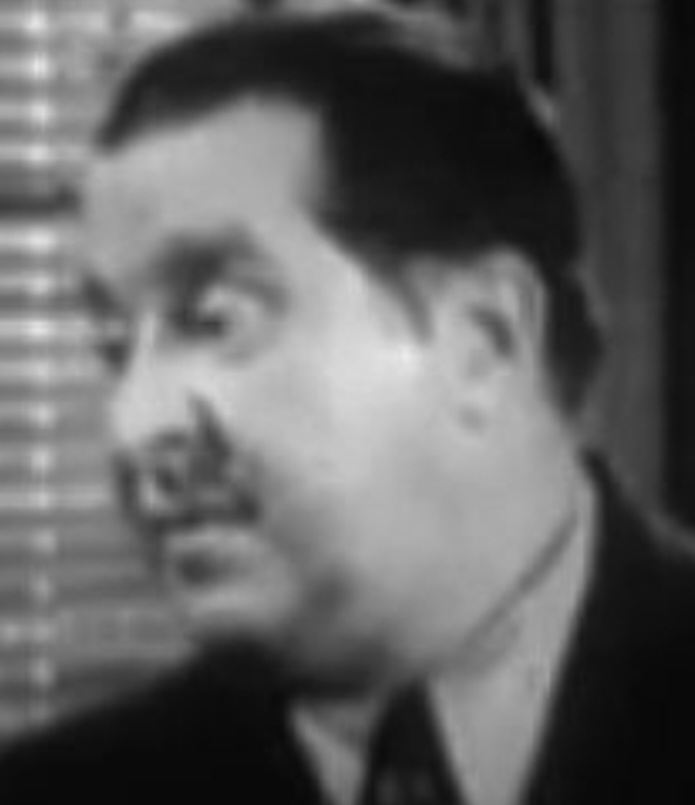
- Sanford in Submarine Alert (1943)
- Born: Ralph Dayton Sanford; May 21, 1899; Springfield, Massachusetts, U.S.
- Died: June 20, 1963 (aged 64); Los Angeles, California, U.S.
- Occupation: Actor
- Years active: 1930–1960

Ralph Dayton Sanford (May 21, 1899 – June 20, 1963) was an American film actor. He appeared in more than 180 films and in at least 200 episodes on television between 1930 and 1960, mostly bit parts or supporting roles. Sanford frequently appeared in Westerns and was often portrayed "tough guys". Sanford also served in the infantry during World War I.

== Career ==
Sanford's began his professional career in 1924 as the dancing partner of Ray Bolger. He moved to California in 1928 and gained his first movie credit in 1933. He began appearing on television in 1951, playing various roles. He is probably best-remembered on The Life and Legend of Wyatt Earp, appearing in 21 episodes, including 16 as Mayor Jim Kelly during the 1958-1959 season.

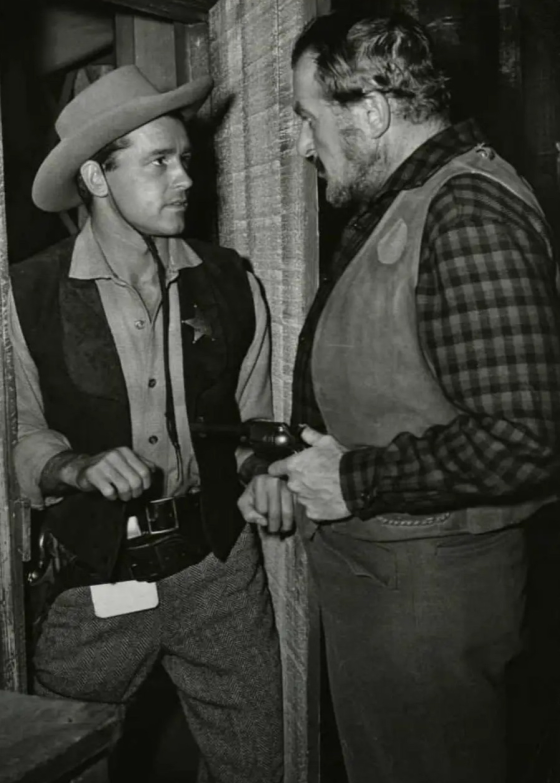
Sanford (right) with Wayne Mallory in Death Valley Days, 1955

On Broadway, Sanford performed in Between Two Worlds (1934), Saluta (1934), They Shall Not Die (1934), Twenty-five Dollars an Hour (1933), Ballyhoo of 1932 (1932), Hey Nonny Nonny! (1932), Child of Manhattan (1932), The Constant Sinner (1931), The Great Man (1931), Mendel, Inc. (1929), and Half a Widow (1927).

== Death ==
Sanford died in Los Angeles, California on June 20, 1963. His body was transported to his birthplace of Springfield, Massachusetts for burial.

== Selected filmography ==
- In the Dough (1932)
- Sea Racketeers (1937)
- Prescription for Romance (1937)
- Undercover Agent (1939)
- Dance, Girl, Dance (1940)
- Alaska Highway (1943)
- Sweethearts of the U.S.A. (1944)
- The Bullfighters (1945)
- Adventures of Kitty O'Day (1945)
- High Powered (1945)
- My Pal Trigger (1946)
- It's a Joke, Son! (1947)
- French Leave (1948)
- Champion (1949)
- The Glass Menagerie (1950)
- Let's Make It Legal (1951)
- Rogue River (1951)
- Torpedo Alley (1952)
- The Life and Legend of Wyatt Earp (TV; 1955-1959, 22 episodes)
- Adventures of Superman (TV, 1955)--"Flight To The North"
- Uranium Boom (1956)
- The Oregon Trail (1959)
- The Purple Gang (1959)
