= The Cyclops (film) =

1957 film by Bert I. Gordon

- Theatrical release poster
- Directed by: Bert I. Gordon
- Written by: Bert I. Gordon
- Produced by: Bert I. Gordon
- Starring: James Craig
- Cinematography: Ira H. Morgan
- Edited by: Carlo Lodato
- Music by: Albert Glasser
- Production companies: B & H Productions, Inc.
- Distributed by: Allied Artists
- Release date: July 28, 1957
- Running time: 66 minutes
- Country: United States
- Language: English
- Budget: $71,500
- Box office: $68,000

The Cyclops is a 1957 American science fiction horror film written, produced and directed by Bert I. Gordon, starring James Craig, Lon Chaney Jr. and Gloria Talbott. The theme of a monster created as a result of radioactivity was a common one in the 1950s.

The Cyclops was released in July 1957 by Allied Artists as a double feature with Daughter of Dr. Jekyll (1957), which also starred Gloria Talbott.

== Plot ==
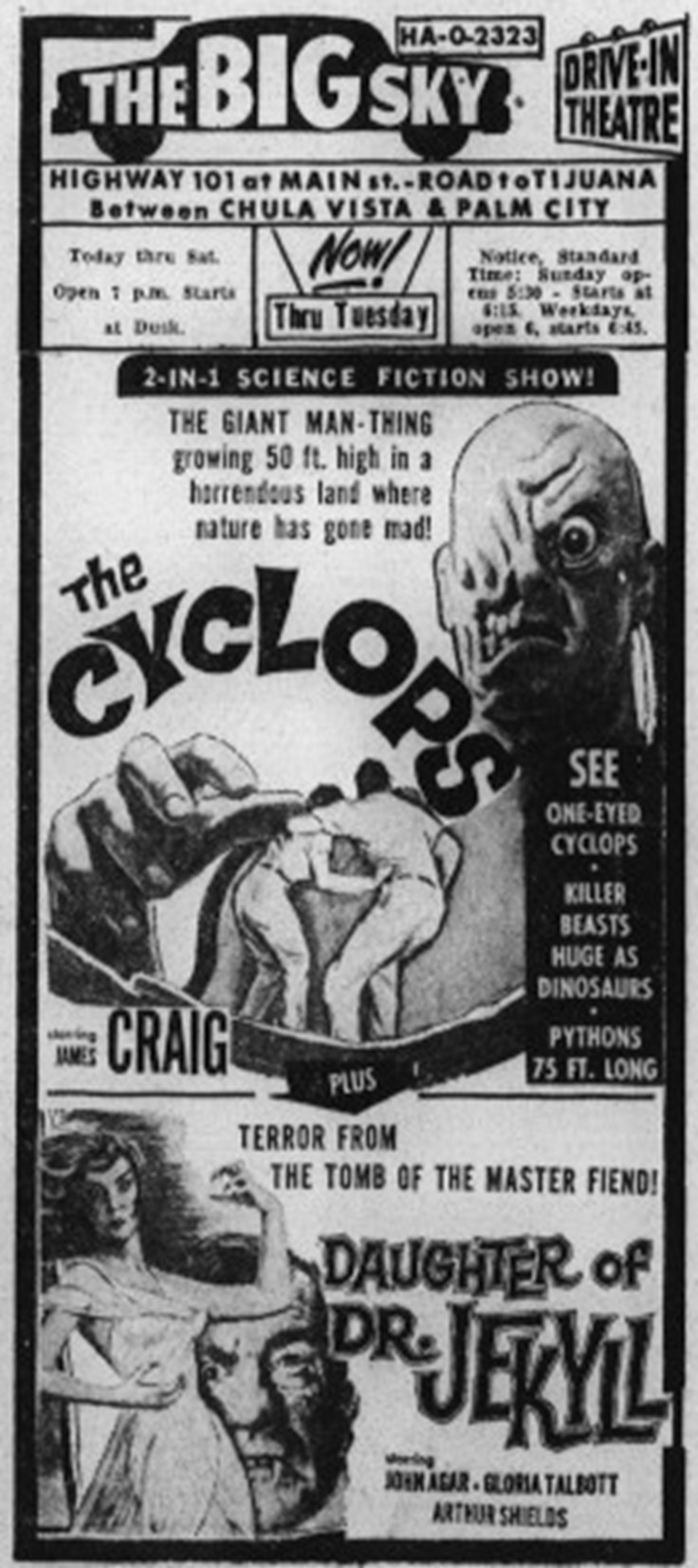
Drive-in advertisement from 1957 for The Cyclops and co-feature, The Daughter of Dr. Jekyll.

Test pilot Bruce Barton is missing and his girlfriend, Susan Winter, organizes a search party, which is sent out in the jungles of Mexico. Scientist Russ Bradford, mining expert Martin "Marty" Melville, and pilot Lee Brand fly into unknown territory. While searching the area, however, they uncover giant mutated Earth animals such as a mouse, an eagle, a spider, a green iguana, a lizard and a boa constrictor.

More importantly, the group encounter Barton, now a mutated 25-ft tall, one-eyed cyclops who became disfigured due to an exposure to radioactivity from massive uranium deposits in the area. This is responsible for the unusual size of all the other giant inhabitants of the region. Barton kills Melville, but appears to recognize Susan. When the cyclops tries to prevent the rest of the group from flying to safety, he is wounded in the eye by Bradford and dies.

== Cast ==
As appearing in The Cyclops (main roles and screen credits identified):

- James Craig as Russ Bradford
- Gloria Talbott as Susan Winter
- Lon Chaney Jr. as Martin "Marty" Melville
- Tom Drake as Lee Brand
- Duncan Parkin as Bruce Barton/The Cyclops
- Vincente Padula as Governor
- Marlene Kloss as Salesgirl
- Manuel López as Policeman
- Paul Frees as vocal effects for The Cyclops

== Production ==
The film was shot in 1955. The main leads, James Craig, Tom Drake and Gloria Talbott signed up for the independent production, which was initially going to be a RKO production, but financing fell through. The producer/director Bert I. Gordon worked feverishly to complete the film before money ran out, with only five or six days allotted to shooting. Not making things any easier was having to contend with Lon Chaney Jr., who was habitually drunk. Duncan Parkin, cast as the cyclops Peter Barton, also played Col. Glenn Manning in the War of the Colossal Beast (1958), the sequel to The Amazing Colossal Man (1957), basically playing the same disfigured giant in both films.

Production effects in The Cyclops were limited to backscreen projection, rudimentary matte work, and incorporating large images into the scenes. In the film, there is a scene in which Barton grabs Susan Winter (Talbott), but he also grabs the background as well, revealing the black color behind it. The discovery of the test pilot Barton's aircraft involves dissimilar and haphazard debris scattered about in the form of a light aircraft wing, a P-51 Mustang canopy and a radial engine.

== Release ==
Gordon sold the distribution rights to RKO, which planned to release the film in 1956 on a double bill with Hammer's X the Unknown. However RKO went out of business. Film rights went to Allied Artists.

The Cyclops was released in July 1957 by Allied Artists as a double feature with Daughter of Dr. Jekyll (1957), which also starred Gloria Talbott.

== Reception ==
Variety said it was "for undiscriminating audiences."

Film critic Leonard Maltin in Leonard Maltin's 2012 Movie Guide (2011) dismissed the film as "Nothing much in this cheapie." (Note: A clip of The Cyclops was later used as part of the original opening sequence of WPIX Channel 11 New York's "Chiller Theatre" back in the 1960s.) In the UK, The Cyclops was cut to only 65 minutes.

== See also ==
- List of American films of 1957
