= Arthur Shields =

Irish actor (1896–1970)

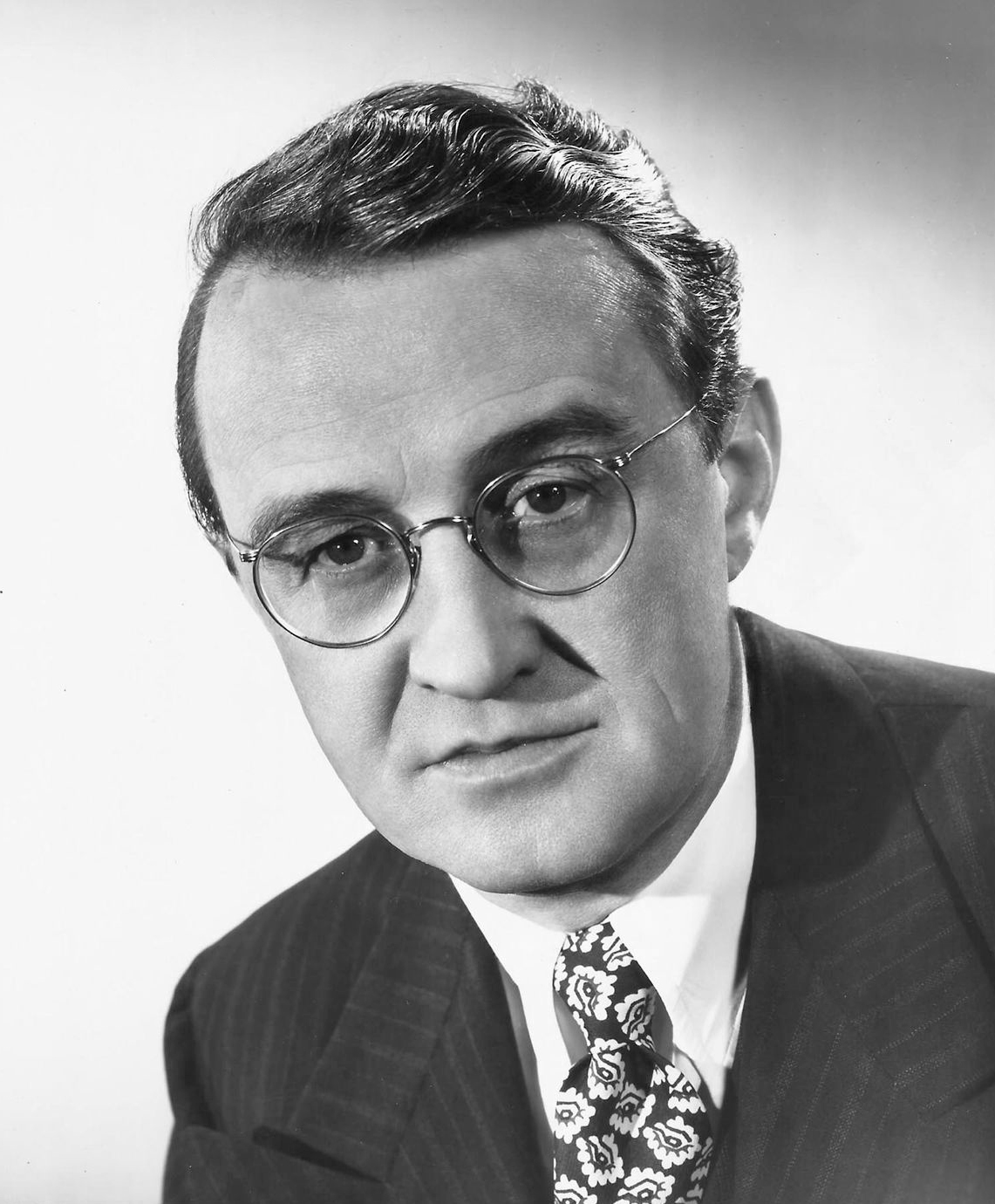
- Shields in 1940
- Born: 15 February 1896; Portobello, Dublin, Ireland
- Died: 27 April 1970 (aged 74); Santa Barbara, California, U.S.
- Resting place: Cremated; ashes buried in Deans Grange Cemetery, Dublin
- Occupation: Actor
- Years active: 1918–62
- Spouses: Bazie Morgan (m. 1920; div. 1943) Aideen O'Connor (m. 1943; died 1950) Laurie Bailey (m. 1955)
- Children: 2
- Family: Barry Fitzgerald (brother)

Arthur Shields (15 February 1896 – 27 April 1970) was an Irish actor on television, stage and film.

== Early years ==
Born in Portobello, Dublin into a family who were members of the Church of Ireland, Shields started acting in the Abbey Theatre when he was 17 years old. He was the younger brother of Oscar-winning actor Barry Fitzgerald. They were the sons of Adolphus Shields, who "was well-known in Dublin as a labour organiser" although the 1901 census listed his occupation as "press reader", and Fanny Sophia Shields (née Ungerland), who was German.

== Irish nationalist activity ==
Along with six others of the Abbey Players, Shields fought in the Easter Rising of 1916. He was interned for six months in the Frongoch internment camp in Frongoch, Wales. His obituary in The Times of San Mateo, California, reported, "... upon his release he was decorated by the Republic of Eire."

== Stage ==
Shields returned to the Abbey Theatre and had a varied career there from 1914 to 1939 as actor, assistant director, director and stage manager. He appeared in many productions (more than 300 roles in 350 plays).While he was there, three of the productions he appeared in were by Irish playwright Teresa Deevy: The Reapers, Temporal Powers, and Katie Roche. Three times he brought the Abbey Company to the United States.

== Film and television ==
In 1936, John Ford brought him to the United States to act in a film version of The Plough and the Stars, and in 1939 Shields decided to live permanently in California, where the mild climate would help his tuberculosis. Some of his memorable roles were in Ford films. Shields portrayed the Reverend Playfair in Ford's The Quiet Man, opposite John Wayne, Maureen O'Hara and his brother, Barry Fitzgerald. He played Dr. Laughlin in She Wore a Yellow Ribbon with Wayne and Joanne Dru, and appeared yet again with Wayne and Barry Fitzgerald in Ford's Long Voyage Home. His other films include: Little Nellie Kelly, The Keys of the Kingdom, The Fabulous Dorseys, Gallant Journey, The Shocking Miss Pilgrim, Drums Along the Mohawk, Apache Drums, Lady Godiva, National Velvet and The River. He also made television appearances including a 1958 role on Perry Mason as Dr. George Barnes in "The Case of the Screaming Woman" as well as a 1960 episode of Maverick starring Roger Moore titled "The Bold Fenian Men."

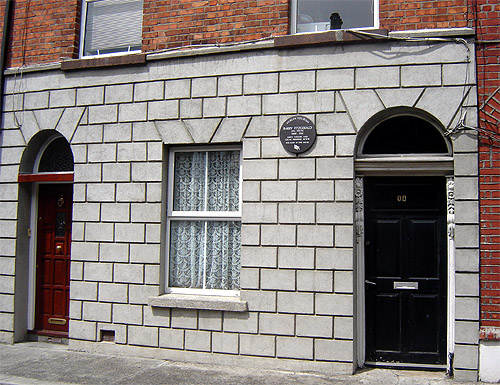
Birthplace of Arthur Shields on Walworth Road, Portobello

== Personal life and death ==
Shields married Bazie Magee in 1920, and their son Adam was born in 1927. The couple divorced in 1943, and Shields subsequently married Aideen O'Connor. Their daughter, Christine, was born in 1946. Aideen died in 1950. Shields' third marriage, to Laurie Bailey in 1955, lasted until his death.

Shields died of complications related to emphysema on 27 April 1970 in Santa Barbara, California. He was cremated, and his ashes were taken to his native Dublin and buried with military honours in Deans Grange Cemetery.

== Filmography ==
- Knocknagow (1918) – Phil Lahy
- The Sign of the Cross (1932) – Chaplain Costello (1944 Re-Release Prologue) (uncredited)
- The Plough and the Stars (1936) – Irish Leader
- Drums Along the Mohawk (1939) – Reverend Rosenkrantz
- The Long Voyage Home (1940) – Donkeyman
- Little Nellie Kelly (1940) – Timothy Fogarty
- Lady Scarface (1941) – Matt Willis
- The Gay Falcon (1941) – Inspector Mike Waldeck
- How Green Was My Valley (1941) – Mr. Parry, deacon
- Confirm or Deny (1941) – Jeff, Blind Typist
- Broadway (1942) – Pete Dailey
- This Above All (1942) – Chaplain
- Pacific Rendezvous (1942) – Prof. Harvey Lessmore
- The Loves of Edgar Allan Poe (1942) – Griswald – Broadway Journal (uncredited)
- Dr. Renault's Secret (1942) – Inspector Duval (uncredited)
- Nightmare (1942) – Sergeant
- Gentleman Jim (1942) – Father Burke
- Dr. Gillespie's New Assistant (1942) – Mr. Kipp (uncredited)
- The Black Swan (1942) – The Bishop (uncredited)
- Random Harvest (1942) – Liverpool Chemist (uncredited)
- Above Suspicion (1943) – Walmer Hotel Porter (uncredited)
- The Man from Down Under (1943) – Father Polycarp
- Lassie Come Home (1943) – Andrew
- Madame Curie (1943) – Businessman (uncredited)
- The White Cliffs of Dover (1944) – Benson (uncredited)
- Youth Runs Wild (1944) – Mr. Dunlop
- National Velvet (1944) – Mr. Hallam
- The Keys of the Kingdom (1944) – Father Fitzgerald – Dean at Holywell
- Roughly Speaking (1945) – Minister (uncredited)
- The Picture of Dorian Gray (1945) – Street Preacher (uncredited)
- The Corn Is Green (1945) – Glyn Thomas
- The Valley of Decision (1945) – Callahan
- Too Young to Know (1945) – Mr. Enright
- Three Strangers (1946) – Prosecutor
- Gallant Journey (1946) – Father Kenton
- The Verdict (1946) – Rev. Holbrook
- Never Say Goodbye (1946) – McCarthy (uncredited)
- The Shocking Miss Pilgrim (1947) – Michael
- Easy Come, Easy Go (1947) – Timothy Mike Donovan
- The Fabulous Dorseys (1947) – Mr. Dorsey
- Seven Keys to Baldpate (1947) – Prof. Bolton
- Fighting Father Dunne (1948) – Mr. Michael O'Donnell
- My Own True Love (1948) – Iverson
- Tap Roots (1948) – Reverend Kirkland
- The Fighting O'Flynn (1949) – Dooley
- She Wore a Yellow Ribbon (1949) – Dr. O'Laughlin
- Red Light (1949) – Father Redmond
- Challenge to Lassie (1949) – Dr. Lee
- Tarzan and the Slave Girl (1950) – Dr. E.E. Campbell
- A Wonderful Life (1951) – Pastor
- Blue Blood (1951) – Tim Donovan
- Apache Drums (1951) – Rev. Griffin
- Sealed Cargo (1951) – Kevin Dolan
- The River (1951) – Mr. John
- The People Against O'Hara (1951) – Mr. O'Hara
- The Barefoot Mailman (1951) – Ben Titus
- Jack and the Beanstalk (1952) – Patrick the Harp (voice)
- The Quiet Man (1952) – Reverend Mr. Cyril Playfair
- Scandal at Scourie (1953) – Father Reilly
- South Sea Woman (1953) – 'Jimmy-legs' Donovan
- Main Street to Broadway (1953) – Actor in Fantasy Sequence
- World for Ransom (1954) – Sean O'Connor
- Pride of the Blue Grass (1954) – Wilson
- River of No Return (1954) – Minister at Tent City (uncredited)
- Lady Godiva of Coventry (1955) – Innkeeper
- The King and Four Queens (1956) – Padre
- The Daughter of Dr. Jekyll (1957) – Dr. Lomas
- Enchanted Island (1958) – James 'Jimmy' Dooley
- Night of the Quarter Moon (1959) – Captain Tom O'Sullivan
- For the Love of Mike (1960) – Father Walsh
- The Pigeon That Took Rome (1962) – Monsignor O'Toole (final film role)

== Television ==
- Your Show Time – 26 episodes – The Bookshop Man (1949)
- The Hardy Boys: The Mystery of the Applegate Treasure – 8 episodes – Boles (1956)
- Perry Mason – episode – The Case of the Screaming Woman – Dr. George Barnes (1958)
- Captain David Grief – episode – The Return of Blackbeard – Angus Macmor (1959)
- Bat Masterson – episode – The Conspiracy: Parts 1 & 2 – Dana Ruggles (1959)
- Maverick – episode – The Bold Fenian Men – Terence Fogarty (1960)
- Wagon Train – episode – The Amos Gibbon Story – Judge Tremayne (1960)
- Rawhide – episode – Incident of the Dust Flower – Sam Cartwright (1960)
- Bonanza – episode – The Stranger – Dennis (1960)
- Death Valley Days – episode – Loophole – Jebal McSween (1961)

== Playography ==
- The Reapers (1930)
- Temporal Powers (1932)
- Katie Roche (1936)
