= The McConnell Story =

1955 film by Gordon Douglas

- Film poster
- Directed by: Gordon Douglas
- Written by: Ted Sherdeman; Sam Rolfe
- Based on: Story by Ted Sherdeman
- Produced by: Henry Blanke
- Starring: Alan Ladd; June Allyson; James Whitmore
- Cinematography: John F. Seitz
- Edited by: Owen Marks
- Music by: Max Steiner
- Color process: WarnerColor
- Production company: Warner Bros. Pictures
- Distributed by: Warner Bros. Pictures
- Release date: September 29, 1955 (New York)
- Running time: 107 mins
- Country: United States
- Language: English
- Box office: $3.5 million (US)

The McConnell Story is a 1955 dramatization of the life and career of United States Air Force (USAF) pilot Joseph C. McConnell (1922–1954) directed by Gordon Douglas. McConnell served as a navigator in World War II before becoming the top American ace during the Korean War and was killed on August 25, 1954, while serving as a test pilot at Edwards Air Force Base in the Mojave Desert, California. The Warner Bros. production, filmed in CinemaScope and Warner Color, stars Alan Ladd as McConnell and June Allyson as his wife. Longtime Warners staff composer Max Steiner wrote the musical score for the film.

== Plot ==
In 1941, Joseph "Mac" McConnell Jr. (Alan Ladd), a private in the Army medical corps near Fitchburg, Massachusetts, aspires to be a pilot, even going AWOL to take private lessons. While flying with his instructor, he realizes that military police are waiting for him at the airport and to avoid arrest, he parachutes out of the aircraft and hitches a ride with teenager Bob Brown (Robert Ellis). Bob takes Mac home with him where he meets Bob's mother (Sarah Selby), young brother Ronnie (Ray Ferrell) and sister Pearl (June Allyson), whom Mac nicknames "Butch".

With the military police on his trail, Mac leaves by a back window and returns to the base, where his superior, Sgt. Sykes (Frank Faylen), sentences him to the stockade. Mac sneaks out and returns to the Brown home to see Butch, and later, after a brief courtship, proposes to her at a boxing match. Sykes reluctantly gives his permission and recommends Mac's promotion and transfer to a medical school in Texas, but the transfer comes through on the McConnells' wedding day, preempting their honeymoon.

At the new base, Mac persuades his instructors that he belongs in flight school. When he is transferred to Washington state, a pregnant Butch returns home. During Christmas leave, Mac tries to hitchhike across country, but gives up when he realizes he will not arrive in time for the birth. Again in trouble, Mac is sentenced to sentry duty but learns about his daughter's birth from fellow student, Ty Whitman (James Whitmore).

Despite wanting to become a pilot, Mac is assigned as a navigator on a Boeing B-17 Flying Fortress bomber. While flying over France, his bomber is attacked by a new German jet aircraft and after crash landing, the aircrew is rescued. In peacetime, Mac is miserable at a desk job in Nebraska. When Ty tells him about the Air Force's recruitment of experienced fliers, he volunteers. Butch supports Mac's decision.

Feeling he was "born to fly," Mac makes his first solo flight on one of the new jet aircraft. Mac is transferred from base to base with his family, which eventually includes another daughter and son. Before he is sent to fight in the Korean War, Mac takes Butch on a picnic in Apple Valley, California, where he has bought property and plans to build a house. Aircraft passing overhead fly in the "missing man formation" which Mac explains that the pilots are honoring a colleague who was killed. (Note: The McConnell Story helped establish the Missing Man Formation as part of military aviation culture.)

In Korea, Mac helps to rescue men on a downed aircraft in the middle of enemy territory. During another mission, his North American F-86 Sabre is shot down over the sea and he must parachute to safety. Mac becomes the "top ace" in the conflict, downing 15 MiG-15 fighters. He is named the first triple jet ace in history, but after shooting down his 16th MiG, Ty and his superiors fear that he is getting tired and reckless and transfer him stateside to train new pilots.

Back home, Mac is given a hero's welcome and meets the president. When the family settles down in Apple Valley, their neighbors present them with the keys to a house specially built for them. Ty, now a colonel, asks Mac to take a job testing new jets but Butch is afraid for his safety. Mac tests the F-86H Sabre, the newest version of the F-86, flying faster and faster, despite Ty's warning to slow down. Suddenly the controls are frozen and Ty radios Mac to bail out. Believing that he can regain control, Mac is killed in the subsequent crash.

Butch sees aircraft overhead in the missing man formation, and realized what happened. Months later, Ty takes Butch to the base where she learns that modifications prompted by Mac's accident will save lives.

== Cast ==
- Alan Ladd as Joseph "Mac" McConnell Jr.
- June Allyson as Pearl "Butch" Brown McConnell
- James Whitmore as Ty Whitman
- Frank Faylen as Sergeant Sykes
- Robert Ellis as Bob Brown
- Willis Bouchey as Newton Bass
- Sarah Selby as "Mom" Brown
- Gregory Walcott as Military Policeman
- Frank Ferguson as The Mechanic
- Perry Lopez as "Red"
- John Pickard as Military Policeman
- Dabbs Greer as Pilot Instructor
- Ray Ferrell as Ronnie Brown
- Arvo Ojala as Cadet

== Production ==
The film was announced in May 1954, with Alan Ladd and June Allyson attached from the beginning. It was Alan Ladd's second consecutive film for Warner Bros. following Drum Beat (1954). Unlike that film, however, it was made for Warner Bros., not Ladd's own production company. Several months after The McConnell Story was announced, McConnell died in a crash. This required the script to be rewritten.

Principal photography for The McConnell Story took place from November 24, 1954, to late January 1955. Filming was aided by the USAF providing equipment and access to air bases. (Note: The film begins with a dedication to the USAF as a "guardian of the peace.") For the Korean air war sequences, eight Republic F-84F Thunderstreaks of the 614th Fighter-Bomber Squadron donned dark blue paint with red stars to portray Mikoyan-Gurevich MiG-15s doing mock battle for the cameras with F-86 Sabres of the 366th Fighter-Bomber Squadron, both units based at Alexandria AFB, Louisiana. Air Defense Command headquarters notified its pilots in January 1955 that the mock MiGs would be operating over portions of the southwestern United States.

For a sequence depicting the rescue of a downed Boeing B-29 Superfortress crew that McConnell was trying to protect, a Sikorsky H-19 of the 48th Air Rescue Squadron, Eglin AFB, Florida, was deployed to Alexandria AFB, Louisiana, for seven days in February 1955. Captain E. R. Thone and Airman First Class Ronald K. Opitz, of the 48th ARS, were the crew for the helicopter, TDY to shoot the rescue sequence.

Colonel William L. Orris, Commander Detachment No. 1, Air Force Operational Test Center at Kirtland AFB, New Mexico was a technical advisor for the film. The other technical advisor was Captain Manuel "Pete" Fernandez, third-ranking US jet ace of the Korean War who came home from Korea with McConnell in 1953. Fernandez also flew most of the F-86 aerial sequences in the film.

Shown on American Movie Classics, host Bob Dorian said that Ladd, who hated flying, filmed his scenes in mockups in front of blue screens. He also noted that Ladd and Allyson fell in love during filming; Ladd reportedly called Allyson's husband, actor/director Dick Powell, and told him, "I'm in love with your wife," to which Powell replied, "Everyone is in love with my wife."

Douglas would stay in a bungalow next to Ladd's and he would hear Ladd throwing up before filming on the first day of shooting. Ladd told him he did that on the first day of every film he made. "Alan was afraid of dialogue," said Douglas. "He'd go behind the set and throw up. His was a sad story. He started hitting the jug... But Alan was basically a very lovable guy."

== Reception ==
The McConnell Story was premiered in New York and preceded by a parade honoring the Air Force Wives Association. The film was critically reviewed by A. H. Weiler (A.W.) for The New York Times in the September 25, 1955 issue. He noted: "For the saga of the late Capt. Joseph McConnell, which cleaves to the facts about the restless, intrepid airman who became America's first triple jet ace during the Korean unpleasantness, is dramatic only when it is rocketing through the wild blue yonder. It plods unimaginatively every time it is grounded."

== Home media ==
The McConnell Story was released in the VHS home video format in 1995.

== See also ==
- List of American films of 1955
