= Giulio Maculani =

Italian actor

- Born: 7 August 1920; Viterbo
- Died: 21 November 1980 (aged 60); Ostia (Rome)
- Occupations: Actor, stunt actor and assistant director

Giulio Maculani (7 August 1920 – 21 November 1980) was an Italian actor, stunt actor and assistant director.

He appeared in Il Leone di San Marco (1963), directed by Luigi Capuano. and in western films such as Un poker di pistole (1967), directed by Joseph Warren, and Sette winchester per un massacro, directed by Enzo G. Castellari.

He also appeared in Hercules, Prisoner of Evil (1964), directed by Antonio Margheriti; Hercules the Avenger (1965), directed by Maurizio Lucidi; Revenge of the Barbarians (1960), directed by Giuseppe Vari; and War of the Zombies (1964).

He played Spanish Patrol Captain in L'avventuriero della tortuga (1964), and Giulio in The Black Duke (1963),

== Partial filmography ==
- Il nostro campione (1955)
- Revenge of the Barbarians (1960)
- The Trojan Horse (1961)
- The Black Duke (1963) as Giulio
- Zorro and the Three Musketeers (1963)
- The Executioner of Venice (1963)
- The Lion of St. Mark (1963) as Cpt. Ostenburg
- War of the Zombies (1964)
- Hercules, Prisoner of Evil (1964) as Varos
- The Last Gun (1964) as Sheriff
- La vendetta dei gladiatori (1964) as Gladiator
- Sons of the Leopard (1965)
- Blood for a Silver Dollar (1965) as Capitan
- Hercules the Avenger (1965)
- L'avventuriero della tortuga (1965) as Spanish Patrol Captain
- Spy in Your Eye (1965) as Stanko
- 4 Dollars of Revenge (1966) as Sheriff
- Django (1966) as Klan Member (uncredited)
- Ringo and His Golden Pistol (1966)
- Pigalle... barrio prohibido (1966)
- Danger!! Death Ray (1967) as Gary - Mustachioed Henchman (as Julian Macmillan)
- Requiescant (1967) as Ferguson Henchman (uncredited)
- Renegade Riders (1967) as Sheriff
- Un poker di pistole (1967)
- The Last Killer (1967) as Sheriff (uncredited)
- Gente d'onore (1967)
- Fantabulous Inc. (1967)
- I racconti del maresciallo (1968, TV Series) as Guardiacaccia Giulio / Vicebrigadiere Ferrero
- Le inchieste del commissario Maigret (1968, TV Series) as Stein
- The Longest Hunt (1968) as Sheriff (as Samuel Stevens)
- Time and Place for Killing (1968) as Cavalry Officer (uncredited)
- Hole in the Forehead (1968)
- Time and Place for Killing (1968)
- A Place in Hell (1969)
- Even Angels Eat Beans (1973) as Debitor (uncredited)
- Women in Cell Block 7 (1973)
- The Knock Out Cop (1973) (uncredited)
- El contragolpe (1974) as Maloney Henchman
- Per amore di Poppea (1977)
- El sheriff y el pequeño extraterrestre (1979) as Newman Fire Chief (uncredited) (final film role)

== Bibliography ==
- Cowie, Peter; Elley, Derek (1977). World Filmography: 1967. Fairleigh Dickinson Univ Press. p. 688. ISBN 9780498015656.
- Smith, Gary Allen (3 September 2015). Epic Films: Casts, Credits and Commentary on More Than 350 Historical Spectacle Movies (2nd ed.). McFarland Publishing. p. 320. ISBN 9781476604183.
- Kinnard, Roy; Crnkovich, Tony (20 February 2017). Italian Sword and Sandal Films, 1908-1990. McFarland Publishing. p. 256. ISBN 9781476662916.
