= Bullwhip (film) =

1958 film

- Theatrical release poster
- Directed by: Harmon Jones
- Written by: Adele Buffington
- Produced by: Helen Ainsworth
- Starring: Guy Madison; Rhonda Fleming
- Cinematography: John J. Martin
- Edited by: Thor L. Brooks
- Music by: Leith Stevens
- Color process: Color by DeLuxe
- Production companies: Romson Productions; William F. Broidy Productions
- Distributed by: Allied Artists Pictures
- Release date: June 21, 1958
- Running time: 80 minutes
- Country: United States
- Language: English

Bullwhip is a 1958 American CinemaScope Western film directed by Harmon Jones and starring Guy Madison and Rhonda Fleming. The film is about a cowboy in Abilene, Kansas who agrees to a marriage to avoid being hanged. The film was shot at Kenny Ranch in Murphys, California. It was the final feature film screenplay of Adele Buffington.

== Plot ==
Steve Daley is about to be hanged for a killing he committed in self-defense when a crooked judge makes him an offer. If he is willing to marry a woman who needs to be wed immediately to collect an inheritance, Steve will be set free. He agrees and is married to a woman identified only as "Julia," who kisses him once and immediately leaves town.

Given an affidavit as proof of his innocence, Steve is turned loose, but immediately fired upon by a gunman, Karp, who works for the town's sheriff. Steve's old sidekick Podo rescues him and together they ride off, angering the sheriff.

On the trail, they meet John Parnell, a fur trader, who reveals that the woman is actually Cheyenne O'Malley, heiress to a prosperous fur business. She has a business advantage because she is half-Cheyenne and the Tribe grants her safe passage. Parnell wants to be in business with her. He offers a reward to Steve and Podo if they will catch her wagon train and persuade her to see things his way. Behind their backs, Parnell also pays Karp to go after them.

Catching up to her, Steve assumes his rights as a husband, with both the wagons and his wife. Cheyenne resists, cracking her bullwhip at him, though she also has developed romantic feelings toward him. After a falling out, however, Cheyenne steals the affidavit, which is in turn stolen by Karp from her. Parnell attempts to blackmail Cheyenne into signing over half her empire to him in return for the affidavit. Steve arrives in time and conquers Parnell in a bloody fistfight.

Pine Hawk, Cheyenne's loyal Indian bodyguard, enters the room to find Cheyenne and Steve locked in passionate embrace while standing over Parnell's unconscious form. The Indian diplomatically shuts the doors and stands guard.

== Cast ==
- Guy Madison as Steve Daley
- Rhonda Fleming as Cheyenne O'Malley
- James Griffith as 'Slow' Karp
- Don Beddoe as Judge Carr
- Peter Adams as John Parnell
- Dan Sheridan as Podo
- Burt Nelson as Pine Hawk
- Al Terr as Lem Pierce
- Tim Graham as Pete
- Hank Worden as Tex
- Wayne Mallory as Larry
- Barbara Wooddell as Mrs. Sarah Mason (as Barbara Woodell)
- Rush Williams as Judd
- Don Shelton as Hotel Keeper
- Jack Reynolds as Sheriff
- Frank Griffin as Keeler
- Iron Eyes Cody as Indian Chief
- Jack Carr as Trimble
- Rick Vallin as Marshal Hendricks
- Sol Goss as Deputy Luke (as Saul Gorss)

== Reception ==
Variety called it "not a picture to tax the mind, but it is a big, colorful outdoor romance designed, purely and simply to be a box-office success and it has the necessary and proper ingredients for that."

== See also ==
- List of American films of 1958
