= The Hard Man =

1957 film by George Sherman

- Film poster
- Directed by: George Sherman
- Screenplay by: Leo Katcher
- Based on: Leo Katcher (Based on his Novel)
- Produced by: Helen Ainsworth
- Starring: Guy Madison
- Cinematography: Henry Freulich
- Edited by: William A. Lyon
- Color process: Technicolor
- Production company: Romson Productions
- Distributed by: Columbia Pictures
- Release date: December 1957
- Running time: 79 minutes
- Country: United States
- Language: English

The Hard Man is a 1957 American Western film directed by George Sherman and starring Guy Madison.

== Plot ==
Steve Burden, a Texas Ranger, is hunting his old friend Ray Hendry, who has been accused of murder. When Burden finds him, Hendry tells him he is innocent and refuses to go with him, believing he will not receive a fair trial. Hendry shoots at Burden, who returns fire, killing him. He takes Hendry's body back to town, where Hacker, the ageing sheriff of El Solito, asks him to be his deputy. Burden accepts, intent on discovering if Hendry was framed, and if so, bringing the guilty to justice.

The cattle baron Rice Martin and his henchmen dominate El Solito, killing farmers who get in their way. Martin's wife, Fern, hates him and wants someone to kill him so she can be free. Martin knows Burden threatens his hold over the district, and orders his gunslinger to deal with Burden, but Burden kills him in a bar-room showdown. Fern tries to seduce Burden to get him on her side against her husband, but Burden rejects her. Eventually the truth about Hendry emerges.

== Cast ==
- Guy Madison as Steve Burden
- Valerie French as Fern Martin
- Lorne Greene as Rice Martin
- Myron Healey as Ray Hendry
- Barry Atwater as George Dennison
- Robert Burton as Sheriff Hacker
- Rudy Bond as John Rodman
- Trevor Bardette as Mitch Willis
- Renata Vanni as Juanita

== See also ==
- List of American films of 1957
