= The 27th Day =

1957 film by William Asher

- Theatrical release poster
- Directed by: William Asher
- Written by: Robert M. Fresco (uncredited)
- Based on: The 27th Day; 1956 novel by John Mantley
- Produced by: Helen Ainsworth
- Starring: Gene Barry; Valerie French; George Voskovec; Arnold Moss
- Cinematography: Henry Freulich
- Edited by: Jerome Thoms
- Music by: Mischa Bakaleinikoff (conductor)
- Distributed by: Columbia Pictures
- Release date: July 1957
- Running time: 75 minutes
- Country: United States
- Language: English

The 27th Day is a 1957 American black-and-white science fiction film, distributed by Columbia Pictures. It was produced by Helen Ainsworth, directed by William Asher, and stars Gene Barry, Valerie French, George Voskovec, and Arnold Moss. The screenplay by John Mantley is based on his 1956 original science fiction novel of the same name.

== Plot ==
Englishwoman Evelyn Wingate, American reporter Jonathan Clark, Chinese peasant Su Tan, German physicist Klaus Bechner, and Soviet soldier Ivan Godofsky are randomly transported to an alien spacecraft in Earth orbit. There, they are met by a humanoid referring to himself only as "The Alien", who explains that he is the representative of a world orbiting a sun about to go nova. Needing a new world to inhabit within the next 35 days, yet prohibited by their moral code from killing intelligent life, The Alien provides each of the five with sets of three capsules in a clear, round, hand-held case. Each set is capable of destroying all human life within a 3,000-mile diameter; their expectation is that humanity will use all the capsules, obliterating itself, leaving the Earth for the aliens to populate. The capsules' containers can only be opened by the thought waves of the person to whom they were given. Once out in the open, they can be used by anyone, but only during the next 27 days, after which the capsules become inert. The Alien states that if humanity does not destroy itself, the Aliens cannot invade and will perish. He also explains that if one or more of the five die, their capsules will self-destruct and become harmless.

Returned to Earth, Eve throws her case into the English Channel and books a flight to Los Angeles. Su Tan chooses to commit suicide, and her capsules self-destruct. The others go about their business when the Alien commandeers all Earth's communications and reveals to the world the existence and power of the capsules. Overhearing the broadcast, Bechner is hit by a car while crossing the street and is taken to the hospital, while Pvt. Godofsky is detained by his superiors. Arriving in Los Angeles, Eve is met by a now-disguised Clark, who takes her to a closed race track where they can safely hide. Godofsky is interviewed by a Soviet general who, dissatisfied with his vague story, orders him subjected to intense interrogation.

Panic over the Alien's broadcast grows in the days that follow. Repeated beatings leave Godofsky in shock, while a recovering Bechner refuses to reveal the details of the Alien's plan. After two Communist agents nearly succeed in killing Bechner, and an innocent man who looked like Clark is killed by a mob, Clark and Eve reveal themselves and are taken into government custody.

Through the application of sodium pentothal to Godofsky, the Soviets discover the Alien's plan and gain access to his capsules. Their resulting announcement fuels global anxiety, prompting the other three remaining to cooperate with authorities. Confronted with an ultimatum for all U.S. military forces to withdraw throughout the world, one of Bechner's capsules is tested to verify the Soviet threat. A dying volunteer is left on a raft in the ocean, just within the 3,000 mile limit, while the U.S. Navy destroyer that delivered him sits safely outside that limit. Aboard, an emotionally wrought Bechner has to be convinced to open his case, but he is unable to use the capsules. The Admiral takes them and reads the coordinates out loud; the subject is instantly vaporized. Now convinced of the capsules' power, the U.S. military begins withdrawing its forces worldwide in compliance with the Soviet blackmail.

Aboard ship, Bechner, Clark, and Eve discuss that the Soviets must use the capsules at the last minute to avoid retaliation. Determined to find a way to counter this, Bechner studies the remaining capsules and discovers an imprinted mathematical code. As the Soviet general prepares to use the capsules, Godofsky rushes him and knocks them from the general's hands; they fall to the ground two stories below. At the very same instant, Bechner launches the capsules. He later explains that the hidden code is programmed for both life and death. The entire Earth is blanketed with a high-pitched sonic wave from space that selectively kills every "known enemy of human freedom".

Later, humanity, unified under the United Nations, extends an invitation to the Alien and his race to coexist with us peacefully on Earth. The preceding events had secretly been a test of humanity's character, a way for the Alien to judge mankind's true nature. The Alien accepts the offer, and a new day like no other dawns for humanity.

== Cast ==
- Gene Barry as Jonathan Clark
- Valerie French as Evelyn "Eve" Wingate
- George Voskovec as Professor Klaus Bechner
- Azemat Janti as Ivan Godofsky
- Arnold Moss as The Alien
- Stefan Schnabel as The Soviet General
- Paul Frees as Ward Mason
- Maria Tsien as Su Tan
- Ralph Clanton as Mr. Ingram
- Friedrich von Ledebur as Dr. Karl Neuhaus
- Theo Marcuse as Col. Gregor
- Paul Birch as The Admiral
- Emil Sitka as The Newsboy

== Production ==
The film recycles stock footage from Earth vs. The Flying Saucers (1956).

== See also ==
- List of American films of 1957

== Bibliography ==
- Warren, Bill. Keep Watching The Skies, American Science Fiction Movies of the Fifties, Vol I: 1950–1957. Jefferson, North Carolina: McFarland & Company, 1982. ISBN 0899500323.
