= Slave of Rome =

- Directed by: Sergio Grieco
- Written by: Franco Prosperi; Silvano Reina; Marco Vicario
- Produced by: Marco Vicario
- Starring: Rossana Podestà; Guy Madison
- Cinematography: Vincenzo Seratrice
- Music by: Armando Trovajoli
- Release date: 1961
- Language: Italian

Slave of Rome (Italian: La schiava di Roma, also known as Slave Warrior) is a 1961 Italian peplum film written and directed by Sergio Grieco and starring Rossana Podestà and Guy Madison.

== Plot ==
The peace treaty with Rome was broken when Gaius Valerius and his legion were wiped out by a tribe of Gauls led by Lysircos, so Julius Caesar gave his son, Tribune Marcus Valerius and his British and German auxiliary legionaries, who were loyal to his father a chance to avenge his death. Caesar wants to extend his frontiers in Gaul and stop the tribes from joining those of Vercingetorix, the leader of all the Gallic tribes. Among the other tribal leaders, Modius wants to renew the peace treaty with Rome, acknowledging their superior power and wants peace for his beautiful daughter Antea, but Lysiricos wants the Romans out of Gaul. Tribune Marcus Valerius now faces a difficult task. Will it be peace or war?

== Cast ==
- Rossana Podestà as Antea
- Guy Madison as Marcus Valerius
- Mario Petri as Lycircos
- Giacomo Rossi Stuart as Claudius
- Ignazio Leone as Lutinius
- Raf Baldassarre as The German Mercenary
- Niksa Stefanini as Modius
- Freddy Hunger as Trullius
- Mirko Boman as Theod
- Nando Poggi as Roman Soldier
- Nazzareno Zamperla as Roman Soldier
