= Dan Sheridan =

American actor

- Dan Sheridan in Maverick 1959
- Born: Daniel Marvin Sheridan; September 3, 1916; Ireland
- Died: June 29, 1963 (aged 46); Encino, California, U.S.
- Occupations: Film and television actor
- Years active: 1957–1963

Daniel Marvin Sheridan (September 3, 1916 – June 29, 1963) was an Irish-American actor who appeared in more than thirty-five television series between 1957 and his death at the age of forty-six in 1963. He was cast in forty-one episodes of the ABC/Warner Brothers western series, Lawman, usually as the bartender, Jake Summers.

== Early life and career ==
Born in Ireland, Sheridan was honored for his service during World War II with the Australian Military Cross, the Anzac Military Medal, the United States Silver Star, and the French Croix de Guerre.

A supporting player, he also appeared in several films, including Cry of the City with Victor Mature and Shelley Winters, Bullwhip with Guy Madison and Rhonda Fleming, and Cole Younger, Gunfighter. In 1959 he played Doc Baxter in the "Duel at Sundown" episode of Maverick starring James Garner and Clint Eastwood, an ABC/WB western. Two years earlier in 1957 he also appeared as a derby-topped yahoo in the series' episode "Ghost Rider". Later that same first season he played the butler in the episode "Black Fire" with Garner and Hans Conried. He played Sheriff McVey in "The Rifleman" S1 E24 "The Trade" which aired 3/9/1959.

Other television series in which Sheridan appeared, often several times in various roles, include Alfred Hitchcock Presents, The Untouchables with Robert Stack, The Rough Riders, Bat Masterson with Gene Barry, Yancy Derringer with Jock Mahoney, Jefferson Drum, Have Gun - Will Travel with Richard Boone, Colt .45 with Wayde Preston, The Rebel with Nick Adams, Gunsmoke with James Arness, Bronco with Ty Hardin, Cheyenne with Clint Walker, Tales of Wells Fargo with Dale Robertson, Bonanza, The Virginian, Rawhide, Checkmate with Sebastian Cabot and Doug McClure, and Route 66. In 1962 Sheridan appeared as Pilbeam on The Virginian in the episode "Big Day, Great Day." In 1963 Sheridan appeared as Brakeman on The Virginian in the episode "Run Away Home."

== Selected filmography ==
- Alfred Hitchcock Presents (1957) (Season 2 Episode 36: "Father and Son") as Second Sergeant
- Alfred Hitchcock Presents (1958) (Season 3 Episode 34: "The Crocodile Case") as Sergeant Rason
