= The Rough Riders (TV series) =

- Genre: Western
- Written by: Richard Dorso; George Fass; Gertrude Fass; Bruce Geller; Paul King; Samuel A. Peeples; Teddi Sherman; Joseph Stone; R.E. Thompson
- Directed by: Franklin Adreon; Monroe P. Askins; Leon Benson; Alan Crosland Jr.; Walter Doniger; Eddie Davis; Henry S. Kesler; Otto Lang; John Rich
- Starring: Kent Taylor; Jan Merlin; Peter Whitney
- Theme music composer: Cliff Radford
- Country of origin: United States
- Original language: English
- No. of seasons: 1
- No. of episodes: 39

Production
- Producer: Vernon E. Clark
- Cinematography: Monroe P. Askins; Jacques R. Marquette
- Editors: Tony Martinelli; Thomas Scott; Joseph Silver
- Running time: 30 mins.
- Production company: Ziv Television Programs

Original release
- Network: ABC
- Release: October 2, 1958 – September 24, 1959

The Rough Riders is an American Western television series set in the West after the American Civil War. It aired on ABC for the 1958-1959 television season. It was produced by Ziv Television.

== Synopsis ==
The program is about three ex-soldiers, two at one time fighting for the Union side and one for the Confederate, who traveled together across the West, fighting trouble and bad guys. The series starred Kent Taylor as ex-Union Captain Jim Flagg, Jan Merlin as former Confederate Lieutenant Colin Kirby, and Peter Whitney as former Union Sergeant Buck Sinclair. Prior to his starring role in The Rough Riders, Kent Taylor previously starred in still another Ziv Television-produced series, Boston Blackie, which aired for two seasons in syndication from 1951–53.

== Guest stars ==
Among series guest stars were John Anderson, Russ Bender, Lon Chaney Jr., James Coburn, Mike Connors, William Conrad, Russ Conway, Bill Coontz, Walter Coy, Broderick Crawford, Richard Garland, Mimi Gibson, Carol Henry, Ed Hinton, Jack Hogan, DeForest Kelley, Douglas Kennedy, George Macready, Wayne Mallory, Ted Mapes, Tyler McVey, Joyce Meadows, Troy Melton, Leonard Nimoy, Judson Pratt, Stuart Randall, Karen Sharpe, Dan Sheridan, Guy Teague, Robert Tetrick, Carol Thurston, Gary Vinson, Patrick Waltz, Barbara Woodell and Larry Pennell.

== Episodes ==
No.	Title	Directed by	Written by	Original release date
1	"The Murderous Sutton Gang"	Eddie Davis	Bret Hill	October 2, 1958
2	"Breakout"	Unknown	Unknown	October 9, 1958
3	"The Maccabites"	Unknown	Unknown	October 16, 1958
4	"The Duelists"	Unknown	Unknown	October 23, 1958
5	"The Imposters"	Unknown	Unknown	October 30, 1958
6	"The Governor"	Monroe Askins	Frederic Louis Fox	November 6, 1958
7	"Blood Feud"	David Friedkin	Bret Hill	November 13, 1958
8	"The Nightbinders"	Unknown	Unknown	November 20, 1958
9	"Shadow of the Past"	Unknown	Unknown	November 27, 1958
10	"Killers at Chocktaw Valley"	Unknown	Unknown	December 4, 1958
11	"The Counterfeiters"	Unknown	Unknown	December 11, 1958
12	"Strand of Wire"	Unknown	Unknown	December 18, 1958
13	"The Electioners"	Unknown	Unknown	January 1, 1959
14	"The Scavengers"	Unknown	Unknown	January 8, 1959
15	"An Eye for an Eye"	Otto Lang	Joe Stone & Paul King	January 15, 1959
16	"Double Cross"	Unknown	Unknown	January 22, 1959
17	"Wilderness Trace"	Unknown	Unknown	January 29, 1959
18	"The Plot to Assassinate President Johnson"	Unknown	Unknown	February 5, 1959
19	"The End of Nowhere"	Unknown	Unknown	February 12, 1959
20	"A Matter of Instinct"	Unknown	Unknown	February 19, 1959
21	"Witness Against the Judge"	Unknown	Unknown	February 26, 1959
22	"End of Track"	Unknown	Unknown	March 5, 1959
23	"Death Sentence"	Unknown	Unknown	March 12, 1959
24	"The Double Dealers"	Unknown	Unknown	March 19, 1959
25	"Lesson in Violence"	Unknown	Unknown	March 26, 1959
26	"The Promise"	Unknown	Unknown	April 2, 1959
27	"The Injured"	Robert Florey	Samuel A. Peeples	April 9, 1959
28	"Paradise Gap"	Unknown	Unknown	April 16, 1959
29	"Hired Gun"	Unknown	Unknown	April 23, 1959
30	"Gunpoint Persuasion"	Unknown	Unknown	April 30, 1959
31	"The Rifle"	Unknown	Unknown	May 7, 1959
32	"Forty-Five Calibre Law"	Unknown	Unknown	May 14, 1959
33	"Deadfall"	Unknown	Unknown	May 21, 1959
34	"The Highgraders"	Unknown	Unknown	May 28, 1959
35	"The Wagon Raiders"	Franklin Adreon	Samuel A. Peeples	June 4, 1959
36	"Ransom of Rita Renee"	Otto Lang	Joe Stone & Paul King	June 11, 1959
37	"Reluctant Hostage"	Unknown	Unknown	June 18, 1959
38	"The Holdout"	Unknown	Unknown	June 25, 1959
39	"The Last Rebel"	Walter Doniger	Samuel A. Peeples	July 16, 1959

== Production ==
The Rough Riders produced thirty-nine episodes.

P. Lorillard Company was an alternate sponsor for the program.
