= Legacy of the Incas =

1965 film

- Directed by: Georg Marischka
- Written by: Karl May (novel); Winfried Groth; Georg Marischka; Franz Marischka
- Produced by: Alberto Grimaldi, Franz Marischka, Carl Szokoll
- Starring: Guy Madison: Rik Battaglia; Heinz Erhardt
- Cinematography: Siegfried Hold, Juan Mariné Bruguera
- Edited by: Anneliese Artelt, Enzo Alabiso
- Music by: Angelo Francesco Lavagnino
- Production companies: Boyana Film; Franz Marischka Film; Orbita Films; Produzioni Europee Associate; Studija Za Igralni Filmi; Tritone Cinematografica; Órbita Films
- Distributed by: Universal Films Española; Nora-Filmverleih
- Release date: 21 August 1965
- Running time: 100 minutes
- Countries: Spain; Italy; Bulgaria; West Germany
- Language: German

Legacy of the Incas (German: Das Vermächtnis des Inka) is a 1965 adventure film directed by Georg Marischka and starring Guy Madison, Rik Battaglia, and Heinz Erhardt. It was made as a co-production between Bulgaria, Italy, Spain, and West Germany. It is based on the 1892 novel of the same name by Karl May, and was part of a boom in adaptations of the writer's work.

Location shooting took place in Peru, Spain and Bulgaria. The film's sets were designed by the art director Saverio D'Eugenio.

== Synopsis ==
In nineteenth century Peru, two envoys are sent by the government to negotiate with descendants of the Incas and other tribes to stave off a rebellion. Meanwhile, a bandit who killed an Inca priest several years prior seeks to exploit the unrest to his own advantage.

== Cast ==
- Guy Madison as Jaguar / Karl Hansen
- Rik Battaglia as Antonio Perillo
- Fernando Rey as President Castillo
- William Rothlein as Haukaropora
- Francisco Rabal as Gambusino
- Heinz Erhardt as Professor Morgenstern
- Chris Howland as Don Parmesan
- Walter Giller as Fritz Kiesewetter
- Geula Nuni as Graziella
- Carlo Tamberlani as Anciano
- Raf Baldassarre as Geronimo
- Santiago Rivero as Minister Ruiz
- Ingeborg Schöner as Mrs. Ruiz
- Lyubomir Dimitrov as El Brazo Valiente
- Bogomil Simeonov as Grosso

== Bibliography ==
- Bergfelder, Tim (2005) [2004]. International Adventures: German Popular Cinema and European Co-Productions in the 1960s. New York: Berghahn Books. ISBN 978-1-57181-539-2.
- Bock, Hans-Michael; Bergfelder, Tim, eds. (2009). The Concise Cinegraph: Encyclopaedia of German Cinema. New York: Berghahn Books. ISBN 978-1-57181-655-9.
