= Franca Bettoia =

Italian actress (1936–2024)

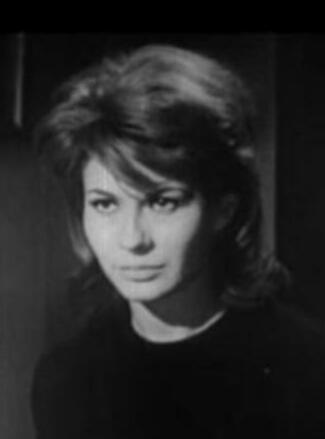
- Bettoia in The Last Man on Earth (1964)
- Born: 14 May 1936; Rome, Italy
- Died: 13 September 2024 (aged 88); Rome, Italy
- Occupation: Actress
- Spouse: Ugo Tognazzi (m. 1972; died 1990)
- Children: Gianmarco Tognazzi; Maria Sole Tognazzi

Franca Bettoia (or Bettoja; 14 May 1936 – 13 September 2024) was an Italian actress known for her role as Ruth Collins in the film The Last Man on Earth.

== Life and career ==
Born in Rome in an upper-class family, Bettoia studied dance at the Teatro dell'Opera di Roma, and made her first film appearance in Un palco all'opera (1955, by Siro Marcellini). She had her breakout in 1958, starring opposite Pietro Germi in A Man of Straw , a role which got her a Grolla d'oro nomination for best actress. In 1962, she got a Nastro d'argento nomination for best supporting actress for her performance in Alfredo Giannetti's Day by Day, Desperately. Despite the critical acclaim for her performances, she was more active in genre films, mostly in adventure and sword-and-sandal films. Among them, in 1964, Bettoia co-starred with Vincent Price in the horror/science fiction film The Last Man on Earth (1964, by Ubaldo Ragone and Sidney Salkow), the first screen adaptation of Richard Matheson's novel I Am Legend.

In 1963, Bettoia started a long relationship with Ugo Tognazzi, whom she married in 1972, and with whom she had two sons, film director Maria Sole Tognazzi and actor Gianmarco Tognazzi.

In 1975, Bettoia and her mother Maris founded the Gran Loggia Femminile d'Italia, the first Italian Masonic obedience exclusively for women which was officially recognized by the Grand Orient of Italy.

Bettoia died in Rome in September 2024, at the age of 88.

== Selected filmography ==
- Desert Warrior (1957)
- La trovatella di Pompei (1957)
- A Man of Straw (1958)
- Le insaziabili (1958)
- The Dam on the Yellow River (1960)
- Day by Day, Desperately (1961)
- Duel of Champions (1961)
- Attack of the Normans (1962)
- The Shortest Day (1963)
- The Lion of St. Mark (1963)
- The Last Man on Earth (1964)
- Sandokan Against the Leopard of Sarawak (1964)
- Sandokan to the Rescue (1964)
- The Seventh Floor (1967)
- Will Our Heroes Be Able to Find Their Friend Who Has Mysteriously Disappeared in Africa? (1968)
- Don't Touch the White Woman! (1974)
- Teste rasate (1993)
