= Feodor Chaliapin Jr. =

Russian actor (1905–1992)

- Фёдор Шаляпин
- Chaliapin in Moonstruck (1987)
- Born: Feodor Feodorovich Chaliapin; 6 October 1905; Moscow, Russia
- Died: 17 September 1992 (aged 86); Rome, Italy
- Occupation: Actor
- Years active: 1921–1992
- Father: Feodor Chaliapin
- Relatives: Boris Chaliapin (brother)

Feodor Feodorovich Chaliapin Jr. (Russian: Фёдор Фёдорович Шаляпин, romanized: Fyodor Fyodorovich Shalyapin; 6 October 1905 – 17 September 1992) was a Russian-born actor, who appeared in many American and Italian films. His career spanned over seven decades, from the 1920s until the early 1990s. He was the son of noted opera singer Feodor Chaliapin.

== Early life ==
Chaliapin was born in Moscow in 1905 to a theatrical family. His father and namesake was the great operatic bass Feodor Chaliapin. His mother, Iola Tornaghi, was an Italian-born ballerina from Monza, who abandoned a promising ballet career to care for Feodor and his five siblings. When the Russian Revolution occurred in October 1917, the Chaliapins attempted to continue living in Russia, but this became impossible, especially after the Bolsheviks reputedly confiscated his wealthy father's money and property. Along with many other Russian émigrés, part of the family emigrated to Paris in 1924, via Finland. The senior Chaliapin used this as his world base, like other émigrés and members of their families who often ended up living in the United States such as Igor Stravinsky, Sergei Rachmaninoff and, for a while, Sergei Prokofiev.

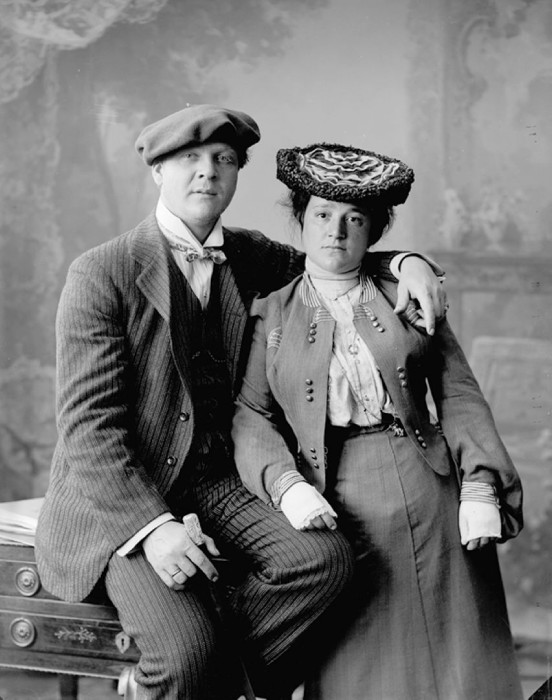
Chaliapin's parents, Feodor Chaliapin Sr. and Iola Tornaghi, 1890–1900

Chaliapin grew up in a family that spoke three languages. He received an excellent education in Moscow and lived there until 1923, when he emigrated to Paris to be with his father, leaving behind his mother and the rest of the family. Chaliapin knew some of the greatest composers and conductors of the 20th century, particularly Rachmaninoff, a personal family friend and teacher of his father.

== Career ==
Tired of living in his father's shadow in Paris, Chaliapin struck out on his own, moving to Hollywood to begin his film career — first in silent movies, in which his then-heavy accent could not be heard in the small bit parts he played. In his later years, Chaliapin achieved international stardom in more major roles.

=== United States ===
In the United States, Chaliapin joined a community of fellow expatriate Russian Empire emigres like Gregory Ratoff, Akim Tamiroff, Konstantin Shayne, Vladimir Sokoloff, Mikhail Rasumny, Leon Belasco, Leonid Kinskey and Michael Chekhov. He made his film debut in the silent film Into Her Kingdom (1926). He played various uncredited bit parts and extra roles throughout the silent and early sound eras.

During the late 1920s, he appeared in two German silent films, Volga Volga and The Ship of Lost Souls. However, his career in Europe was quickly cut short by the rise of Nazism, and he moved back to Hollywood.

In one of his briefest but more notable Hollywood roles, Chaliapin dies in the arms of Gary Cooper in the opening scenes of For Whom the Bell Tolls (1943), based on Ernest Hemingway's 1940 novel.

=== Italy ===
Much of his filmography lies in Italian films. After appearing in 1948's Arch of Triumph, Chaliapin moved to Rome. He appeared on stage, and in the late '50s began appearing in Italian films, where the Italian propensity for dubbing over sync sound meant his Russian accent wouldn't be a hinderance.

He appeared in many different Italian films across a variety of genres, during the following decades, including Victor Tourjansky's The Cossacks, Sodom and Gomorrah, Imperial Venus, The Lion of St. Mark, The Subversives, My Brother Anastasia, and Federico Fellini's Roma. He had a major role in Dario Argento's cult horror film Inferno (1980), as the aged alchemist Varelli.

=== Late career stardom ===
Chaliapin is perhaps most remembered by modern audiences for the film The Name of the Rose (1986), in which he played the venerable blind monk, Jorge de Burgos. Director Jean-Jacques Annaud originally wanted John Huston for the part, but his ill health prevented him from filming, and Chaliapin won the role. At age 81, Chaliapin received mainstream critical attention for the first time in his career, and led to a series of more substantial acting roles in both Italy and Hollywood.

One of his most memorable roles was Grandpa Castorini in Moonstruck (1987), starring Cher and Nicolas Cage. The director, Norman Jewison, sought the advice of his friend Sean Connery in deciding whether to hire him for the role — the two having starred together in The Name of the Rose — who is reputed to have said: "He can't see, he can't hear — but he will steal every scene in the film he's in, he's brilliant".

Chaliapin also played the role of Leonides Cox, Robert De Niro's father in Stanley & Iris (1990). His last notable film role was as Professor Bartnev in Andrei Konchalovsky's The Inner Circle (1991), a true story about Soviet Russia under the dictatorship of Joseph Stalin.

== Personal life ==
Chaliapin was married three times. A longtime resident of Rome, Chaliapin eventually became an Italian citizen.

Chaliapin was reunited with his mother, who then was 87 years old, in Rome in 1960. His mother's emigration was helped by the reforms (the so-called "thaw") of then Soviet first secretary Nikita Khrushchev. The price of this was having to leave behind a museum-quality home and a magnificent art collection in Moscow as collected by Feodor Chaliapin Sr. The only objects of art permitted to leave Russia were photograph albums of Chaliapin's childhood and youth in Moscow.

Mikhail Gorbachev, the last General Secretary of the Communist Party of the Soviet Union, instituted political and economic reforms known as perestroika. Under these reforms, Chaliapin was able to remove his father's remains from Paris to Novodevichy Cemetery in Moscow. The grave is marked by a white marble statue of Chaliapin Sr.

=== Death ===
In 1992, Chaliapin died of natural causes after an illness in Rome. He was survived by his twin sister, Tatiana Chaliapin Chernoff, and several nieces and nephews.

He is buried at the Cimitero Flaminio, Provincia di Roma, in Lazio, Italy.

== Partial filmography ==
- Into Her Kingdom (1926) – Russian Officer and Court Leader
- Volga Volga (1928)
- The Ship of Lost Souls (1929) – Nick
- Lancer Spy (1937) – Monk (uncredited)
- Exile Express (1939) – Kaishevshy
- Balalaika (1939) – Soldier (uncredited)
- My Life with Caroline (1941) – Sky Man (uncredited)
- Law of the Jungle (1942) – Belts
- Mission to Moscow (1943) – Shop Foreman (uncredited)
- For Whom the Bell Tolls (1943) – Kashkin
- The Seventh Victim (1943) – Leo (uncredited)
- Three Russian Girls (1943) – Terkin
- Song of Russia (1944) – Maxim – Anna's Husband (uncredited)
- Lost in a Harem (1944) – Violinist (uncredited)
- A Royal Scandal (1945) Lackey (uncredited)
- Ziegfeld Follies (1945) Lieutenant ('This Heart of Mine') (uncredited)
- Arch of Triumph (1948) – Scheherazade's Chef (uncredited)
- Herod the Great (1959)
- Prisoner of the Volga (1959) – Boris Fomitsch
- The Cossacks (1960) – Hassan
- The Night They Killed Rasputin (1960)
- Francis of Assisi (1961) – Cardinal Savelli (uncredited)
- Sodom and Gomorrah (1962) – Alabias
- Imperial Venus (1962) Maestro di ballo
- The Executioner of Venice (1963) – Doge Giovanni Bembo
- The Lion of St. Mark (1963) – The Doge
- Buffalo Bill, Hero of the Far West (1965) – Chief White Fox
- Un gangster venuto da Brooklyn (1966)
- Ballata da un miliardo (1967)
- The Subversives (1967)
- Il trapianto (1970) – Don Calogero
- Roma (1972) – Actor Playing Julius Cesar (uncredited)
- The Eroticist (1972) – Senator Torsello
- La colonna infame (1972) – Il cardinale arcivescovo di Milano Federico
- My Brother Anastasia (1973) – Frank Costello
- La linea del fiume (1976) – Nonno di Giacomino
- Smooth Velvet, Raw Silk (1976) – Hal
- Inferno (1980) – Professor Arnold / Dr. Varelli
- Salome (1986) – Messenger
- The Name of the Rose (1986) – Jorge de Burgos
- Moonstruck (1987) – Grandpa Castorini
- Catacombs (1988) – Brother Terrel
- The Mask (1988) – Leonardo's father
- The Gamble (1988) – Federico
- The Church (1989) – The Bishop
- Paganini (1989) – Judge
- Modì (1989) – Pierre-Auguste Renoir
- Summer's Lease (1989) as Prince Tosti-Castelnuovo
- Stanley & Iris (1990) – Leonides Cox
- The King's Whore (1990) – Scaglia
- Rossini! Rossini! (1991) – Barone Rothschild
- The Inner Circle (1991) – Prof. Bartnev
- Max et Jérémie (1992) – Sam Marberg (final film role)
