= Jubal (film) =

1956 film by Delmer Daves

- Theatrical release poster
- Directed by: Delmer Daves
- Screenplay by: Russell S. Hughes; Delmer Daves
- Based on: Jubal Troop by Paul Wellman
- Produced by: William Fadiman
- Starring: Glenn Ford; Ernest Borgnine; Rod Steiger
- Cinematography: Charles Lawton Jr.
- Edited by: Al Clark
- Music by: David Raksin
- Color process: Technicolor
- Production company: Columbia Pictures
- Distributed by: Columbia Pictures
- Release date: April 24, 1956 (New York City)
- Running time: 101 minutes
- Country: United States
- Language: English
- Box office: $1.8 million (US)

Jubal is a 1956 American Western film directed by Delmer Daves and starring Glenn Ford, Ernest Borgnine, Rod Steiger, Valerie French, and Felicia Farr. Shot in CinemaScope, it has been described as "one of the new wave of adult westerns that flourished in the fifties" and as "an Othello on the Range." The supporting cast features Noah Beery Jr., Charles Bronson and Jack Elam.

== Plot ==
Jubal Troop (Glenn Ford) is found lying in the road in a weakened condition, without a horse. Shep Horgan (Ernest Borgnine) takes him to his ranch, where one of his workers Pinky (Rod Steiger), accuses Jubal of smelling of sheep dip and burns his clothes after Jubal falls asleep in a bunk.

Horgan is married to an attractive, younger woman named Mae (Valerie French) whom he met in Canada. He offers Jubal a job after seeing him ride an unbroken horse. Meantime, Pinky forces Mae to kiss him saying they used to do this when Horgan was away. Horgan is impressed with Jubal's work ethic and makes him foreman over the other cowhands which antagonises Pinky, whom Horgan does not trust.

Jubal fends off Mae's advances while developing an interest in Naomi (Felicia Farr), a young woman from a travelling wagon train of an unnamed religious group that the cowboys call "rawhiders." Pinky and the other cowboys try to run off the strangers but Jubal says they cause no trouble so they can stay. Jubal's ally is a drifter named Reb (Charles Bronson), who has attached himself to the wagon train. On Jubal's recommendation Reb is hired to help him at the ranch.

One night when the Cowboys are camping away from the ranch house, Mae rides out with a message. Because a mountain lion has been seen recently, Horgan asks Jubal to ride back with Mae. Pinky wakes in the night as Reb leaves camp. He wakes Horgan to tell him, and to suggest Mae and Jubal might be together. Horgan rides home and finds Mae sleeping alone but when he kisses her she mumbles Jubal's name. Horgan hits her and demands to know what has happened. Mae angrily responds Jubal has been seeing her.

An enraged Horgan rides to town and confronts Jubal in the saloon and fires at him. He misses, Reb flips a gun to Jubal who shoots Horgan dead. Reb rides to camp and tells the men what happened. One of them accuses Pinky of causing the death but he denies interfering.

Pinky makes another play for Mae, then beats her savagely when she pushes him away. Pinky then rallies the town to go after Jubal, saying he stole Horgan's wife and murdered Horgan with help from Reb. Meantime, Jubal is being looked after by Naomi and the rawhiders, but half the group don't want to hide him, so the wagons split and go two ways. The posse from town find the wrong half of the wagon train which gives Jubal time to recover. He decides to ride back to the ranch and see Mae. She is lying in a barn in a bad way.

The posse arrive at the ranch and get the truth from a dying Mae. The posse slowly circles Pinky and it's clear they intend to hang him. Naomi rides up and Jubal rides away with her and Reb.

== Cast ==
- Glenn Ford as Jubal Troop
- Ernest Borgnine as Shep Horgan
- Rod Steiger as "Pinky" Pinkum
- Valerie French as Mae Horgan
- Felicia Farr as Naomi Hoktor
- Basil Ruysdael as Shem Hoktor
- Noah Beery Jr. as Sam – Horgan Rider
- Charles Bronson as Reb Haislipp
- John Dierkes as Carson – Horgan Rider
- Jack Elam as McCoy – Bar 8 Rider
- Robert Burton as Dr. Grant

== Production ==
Rod Steiger's role was meant to be played by Columbia contract star Aldo Ray but he was unhappy at not receiving a bonus after being loaned out on other films, and refused to appear.

== Reception ==
Film critic Jonathan Rosenbaum praised the film, calling it a "taut, neurotic melodrama". Lee Pfeiffer from Cinema Retro, in a review of the Criterion Collection's blu-ray release of the film, compares it with Daves's seminal 3:10 to Yuma, saying "there is much in Jubal that rivals that classic". On Rotten Tomatoes the film holds 100% approval rating based on 10 reviews.

== Home media ==
Jubal was released by the Criterion Collection in Blu-Ray and DVD.

== See also ==
- List of American films of 1956
- 3:10 to Yuma, the 1957 film also starring Glenn Ford and directed by Delmer Daves
- Paul Wellman, author of Jubal which was loosely based on Othello
