= Giulio Marchetti =

Italian actor (1911–1993)

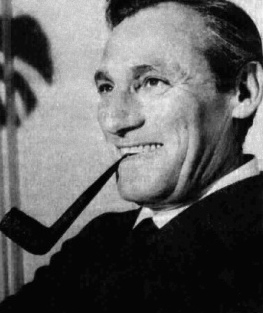
- Born: June 9, 1911; Barcelona, Spain
- Died: December 1, 1993 (aged 82); Rome, Italy
- Occupation: Actor

Giulio Marchetti (9 June 1911 – 1 December 1993) was an Italian stage, film and television actor and presenter.

== Life and career ==
Born in Barcelona, Marchetti was the grandson of the operetta actor and comedian Giulio and the son of the theatrical artistic director Adriano.

After completing high school in Bologna, he began his stage career as a vaudeville actor and singer in the style of the American minstrel show performers. He achieved significant popularity between early 1940s and mid-1950s, thanks to a series of successful revues. He was also active as a character actor in a number of films and television series, often working alongside Totò.

Marchetti was also well known in Italy as the longtime presenter of the show Giochi senza frontiere. In the early 1970s he abandoned show business and became the owner of a service station.

== Partial filmography ==
- Fear and Sand (1948) - Paquito
- Adam and Eve (1949) - Il naufrago americano
- Maracatumba... ma non è una rumba! (1949) - Attrazione internazionale, Himself
- Fugitive Lady (1950) - Giovanni
- L'inafferrabile 12 (1950) - Il commissario
- I cadetti di Guascogna (1950)
- Accidents to the Taxes!! (1951) - Il baritono russo
- My Heart Sings (1951) - Friend of Russo (uncredited)
- Stranger on the Prowl (1952) - Signor Raffetto
- Vacations in Majorca (1959) - Barman (uncredited)
- Giuseppina (1960) - Petrol Station Owner/Father (Filmed 1959)
- Conspiracy of Hearts (1960) - Italian Soldier
- Tough Guys (1960) - Bernabeu
- I piaceri del sabato notte (1960) - Un altro cliente svizzero
- Queen of the Nile (1961) - Meck
- Totò Diabolicus (1962) - Private Detective
- Roaring Years (1962)
- The Secret Mark of D'Artagnan (1962) - The King
- Swordsman of Siena (1962) - Carlos' servant
- The Executioner of Venice (1963) - Bartolo
- The Lion of St. Mark (1963) - Gualtiero
- Sandokan to the Rescue (1964) - Sagapar
- The Secret Invasion (1964) - Italian Officer
- Sandokan Against the Leopard of Sarawak (1964) - Sagapar
- Le tardone (1964) - Manuele (episode "L'armadio")
- Stranger in Sacramento (1965) - Sheriff Joe
- The Adventurer of Tortuga (1965) - Father of the Bride
- The Rover (1967) - Peyrol's first mate
- The Biggest Bundle of Them All (1968) - Lt. Naldi
- La vuole lui... lo vuole lei (1968)
- Captain Typhoon (1971) - Dr. Castell (uncredited)
- Man spricht deutsh (1988) - Receptionist in high-class hotel (final film role)
