= Reverend's Colt =

1970 film

- Directed by: León Klimovsky
- Cinematography: Alberto Fusi
- Music by: Gianni Ferrio; Piero Umiliani
- Release date: 1970
- Countries: Italy; Spain
- Languages: Spanish; Italian; English

Reverend's Colt (originally titled Reverendo Colt) is a 1970 Spanish-Italian Spaghetti Western directed by León Klimovsky.

== Cast ==
- Guy Madison: Reverend Miller
- Richard Harrison: Sheriff Donovan
- Ennio Girolami: Mestizo (credited as Thomas Moore)
- María Martín: Mary MacMurray
- Germán Cobos: Fred
- Ignazio Spalla: Meticcio (credited as Pedro Sanchez)
- Steven Tedd: Gary
- Perla Cristal: Dorothy
- Alfonso Rojas: Colonel Charles Jackson
- Cris Huerta: Pat MacMurray (credited as Cris Huertas)
- José Canalejas: Martin
