= Valerie French (actress) =

British actress (1928–1990)

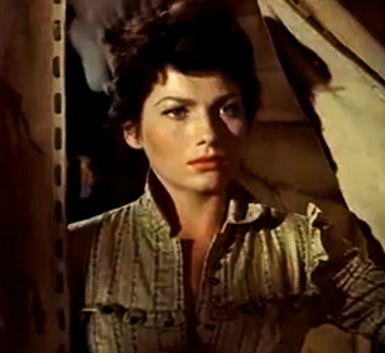
- French in the 1956 film Jubal
- Born: Valerie Harrison; 11 March 1928; London, UK
- Died: 3 November 1990 (aged 62); New York City, US
- Occupation: Actress
- Years active: 1954–1982
- Spouse(s): Michael Pertwee (1952–1959); Thayer David (1970–1975)

Valerie French (born Valerie Harrison; 11 March 1928 – 3 November 1990) was an English film and stage actress whose career began in 1954.

== Career ==
French was born in London to Frank Orvin Percy Harrison and Muriel Smith. Her father was an accountant who had served as a Lieutenant with the Artists Rifles regiment in the First World War.

She considered her "real start in the theatre" to have been at the Theatre Royal, Windsor in Berkshire, England.

She moved into film acting in her early twenties. Her first film appearance was in a minor role in the 1954 Italian film Maddalena. After a role in the British film The Constant Husband (1955), she moved to Hollywood.

Her best-remembered roles during this period were in western films such as Jubal in 1956 opposite Glenn Ford and Decision at Sundown opposite Randolph Scott in 1957. She also appeared in the science fiction film The 27th Day (1957).

Her television roles included episode No. 61 of Have Gun – Will Travel, The Prisoner episode "Living in Harmony", and episode No. 31, "Sweetwater, Texas", of Trackdown (1957). She later appeared in daytime television shows, including two roles on The Edge of Night, The Nurses, and (briefly) All My Children.

== Theatre ==
French returned to the theatre in the 1960s. She performed in a Broadway production of John Osborne's play Inadmissible Evidence in 1965 and was also in Help Stamp Out Marriage! in 1966. She caused a minor sensation by appearing on stage naked in The Mother Lover at the Booth Theatre in 1969, though only her back was visible to the audience.

== Personal life ==
French was married twice. In 1952, at the age of 24, she married the playwright Michael Pertwee (b. 1916). They divorced seven years later.

In 1970, at the age of 42, French married the actor Thayer David (b. 1927). They divorced five years later. They later got back together and were planning to remarry at the time of his death in 1978.

French died of leukemia in New York City in 1990, aged 62. Some sources say she was born in 1932 and was 58 when she died.

== Filmography ==
- Maddalena (1954)
- Happy Ever After (1954)
- The Constant Husband (1955)
- Jubal (1956)
- Secret of Treasure Mountain (1956)
- The Garment Jungle (1957)
- Decision at Sundown (1957)
- The 27th Day (1957)
- The Hard Man (1957)
- The Four Skulls of Jonathan Drake (1959)
- Shalako (1968)
- The Prisoner (TV series episode 14)
