= The Lion of St. Mark (film) =

1963 film by Luigi Capuano

- Theatrical release poster
- Italian: Il Leone di San Marco
- Directed by: Luigi Capuano
- Written by: Luigi Capuano; Arpad De Riso
- Story by: Ottavio Poggi
- Produced by: Ottavio Poggi
- Starring: Gordon Scott; Gianna Maria Canale; Rik Battaglia; Alberto Farnese; Giulio Marchetti; Franca Bettoia
- Cinematography: Alvaro Mancori
- Edited by: Antonietta Zita
- Music by: Carlo Rustichelli
- Production company: Liber Film
- Distributed by: Dear Film
- Release date: 21 November 1963 (Italy)
- Running time: 106 minutes
- Country: Italy
- Language: Italian

The Lion of St. Mark (Italian: Il Leone di San Marco) is a 1963 Italian adventure film co-written and directed by Luigi Capuano.

== Plot ==
Venice, about 1620. The Doge attends a nightly ball to celebrate the betrothal of his son Manrico with Lady Isabella Fiesci and his appointment as ambassador at the royal court of France. Manrico, a patriot and soldier at heart, is not delighted about this arranged marriage, and Gualtiero, his uncle and the Doge's brother-in-law, supports him against his father's opinion. The party is suddenly raided by a gang of Skokian pirates led by Titta and his mate Rossana, who strip the guests of their valuables. Angered by the pirates' boldness and the inability of Venice's mercenary troops under Captain Ostenburg to catch them, Manrico assembles his friends and organizes his own armed resistance movement, assuming the masked identity of The Lion of Saint Mark, after the symbol of Venice.

Manrico leads several successful sorties against the pirates, becoming a symbol of hope for the Venetians. One night, Ostenburg discovers one of the pirates' camps and captures Rossana, while Titta escapes. Manrico, who has fallen in love with Rossana, persuades Ostenburg to entrust her to his supervision, and then releases her, which wins him her affection. Her successful "escape", however, makes Titta suspect her, and when she leaves to meet Manrico at a prearranged date, he sends his lieutenant Vipera after her, who thus finds out about her liaison and identifies Manrico. For the upcoming Feast of the Redeemer celebrations, Titta plans for himself, Rossana and Vipera to infiltrate the Fieschi's ball - to which Rossana was invited by Manrico - and kidnap Manrico to bow the Doge and the people of Venice to his will.

At the ball, Manrico appears dressed in his masked identity, pretending it is merely a costume for the festivities. When he and Rossana meet, she warns him about Titta's plan. Ostenburg recognizes Rossana and arrests her despite Manrico and Gualtiero's intervention. Just as she is about to be led away, Manrico's best friend Jandolo, disguised as the Lion of Saint Mark, bursts in and spirits her away, according to Manrico's plan. Titta and his men follow her and Manrico to her temporary refuge on Torcello, only to run into an ambush. After the pirates have fled, Manrico confesses to Rossana that he is the Lion of Saint Mark, and disgusted, Rossana declines his offer to marry him and rejoins Titta.

After receiving reinforcements, Ostenburg prepares to attack the pirates' stronghold in Ragusa from the seaside. Determined to make this a Venetian victory, and to save Rossana, Manrico intends to infiltrate the castle from the landward side and blast a breach into the wall for his friends (including Gualtiero, who has long found out Manrico's secret identity). As they prepare their attack, the infiltrators are discovered and the element of surprise is lost. While Manrico and the rest of his team barricade themselves in, Ostenburg's troops attack. Rossana, having finally chosen Manrico's side, lights a fuse to the powder magazine, creating the breach through which Manrico's allies can attack and overwhelm Titta and his pirates. To forestall her punishment for piracy by the Doge, Gualtiero adopts Rossana as his daughter, thus allowing her and Manrico to get married.

== Cast ==
- Gordon Scott as Manrico Masiero
- Gianna Maria Canale as Rossana
- Alberto Farnese as Titta
- Giulio Marchetti as Gualtiero
- Rik Battaglia as Jandolo
- Franco Fantasia as Vipera
- Franca Bettoia as Isabella Fieschi
- Feodor Chaliapin Jr. as The Doge
- Giulio Maculani as Captain Ostenburg
