= Ingeborg Schöner =

German actress (born 1935)

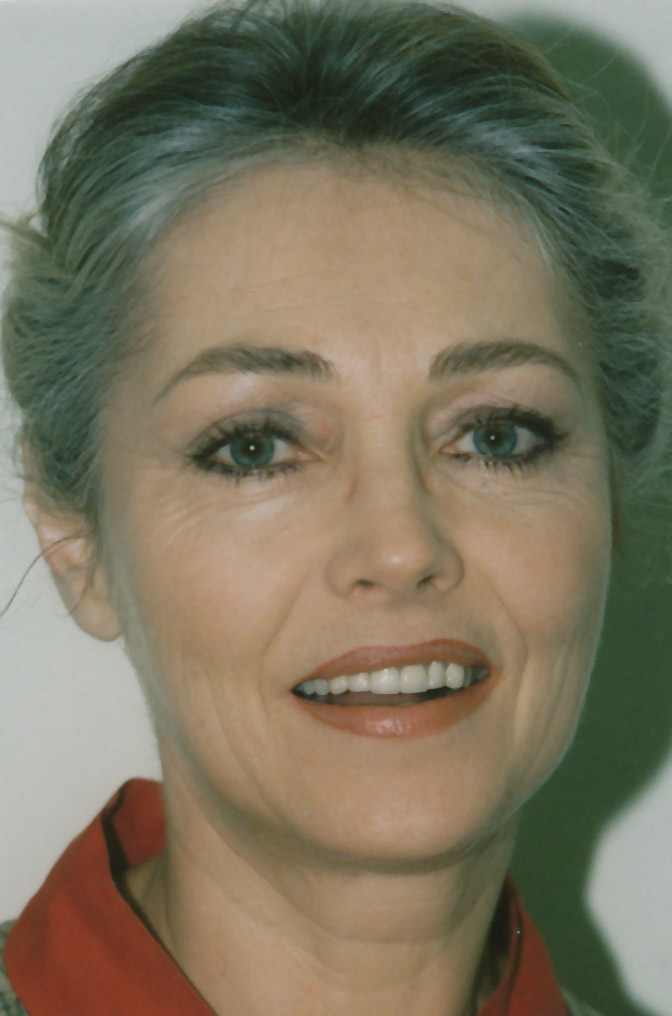
- Born: 2 July 1935 (age 90); Wiesbaden, Hesse-Nassau, Nazi Germany
- Occupation: Actress
- Years active: 1954–present
- Spouse: Georg Marischka (died 1999)
- Children: 2

Ingeborg Schöner (born 2 July 1935) is a German film and television actress.

== Selected filmography ==
- The Silent Angel (1954)
- The Dark Star (1955)
- The Captain and His Hero (1955)
- The First Day of Spring (1956)
- King in Shadow (1957)
- Souvenir d'Italie (1957)
- Pirate of the Half Moon (1957)
- Venice, the Moon and You (1958)
- Adorable and a Liar (1958)
- People in the Net (1959)
- The Cow and I (1959)
- Yes, Women are Dangerous (1960)
- Headquarters State Secret (1960)
- Big Request Concert (1960)
- Season in Salzburg (1961)
- Waldrausch (1962)
- The Sweet Life of Count Bobby (1962)
- Axel Munthe, The Doctor of San Michele (1962)
- Buffalo Bill, Hero of the Far West (1964)
- Love and Marriage (1964)
- Kidnapped to Mystery Island (1964)
- When the Grapevines Bloom on the Danube (1965)
- Legacy of the Incas (1965)
- Letti sbagliati (1965)
- In Bed by Eight (1965)
- Legacy of the Incas (1965)
- The Adventurer of Tortuga (1965)
- Sperrbezirk (1966)
- The Long Day of Inspector Blomfield (1968)
- Mark of the Devil (1970)
- Mr. Superinvisible (1970)
- Old Mamsell's Secret (1972, TV film)
- Die Supernasen (1983)
- Guten Tag, Ramon (2013)
