= Kidnapped to Mystery Island =

- Directed by: Luigi Capuano
- Written by: Emilio Salgari (novel); Arpad DeRiso; Ottavio Poggi
- Produced by: Nino Battiferri
- Starring: Guy Madison; Ingeborg Schöner; Ivan Desny
- Cinematography: Guglielmo Mancori
- Edited by: Antonietta Zita
- Music by: Carlo Rustichelli
- Production companies: Eichberg-Film; Liber Film
- Distributed by: Bavaria Film; Columbia Pictures
- Release date: 27 December 1964
- Running time: 100 minutes
- Countries: Italy; West Germany
- Language: Italian

Kidnapped to Mystery Island (Italian: I misteri della giungla nera, German: Das Geheimnis der Lederschlinge and The Snake Hunter Strangler) is a 1964 Italian-German adventure film directed by Luigi Capuano and starring Guy Madison, Ingeborg Schöner and Ivan Desny. In West Germany it was released by Bavaria Film and in the United States by its parent company Columbia Pictures. It was based on a novel by the popular Italian writer Emilio Salgari.

== Synopsis ==
In British India, the small daughter of a British officer is captured by a cult.

== Cast ==
- Guy Madison as Souyadhana
- Ingeborg Schöner as Ada
- Giacomo Rossi-Stuart as Tremal Naik
- Ivan Desny as Maciadi
- Giulia Rubini as Gundali
- Ferdinando Poggi as Kammamuri
- Peter van Eyck as Captain McPherson
- Aldo Bufi Landi as Sergeant Baratha
- Romano Giomini as Windy
- Aldo Cristiani

== Bibliography ==
- James Robert Parish. Film Actors Guide. Scarecrow Press, 1977.
