= Ubaldo Ragona =

Italian film director and screenwriter

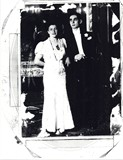
- Ubaldo Ragona with Blandina Terlizzi.
- Born: 1 December 1916; Catania, Italy
- Died: 15 August 1987 (aged 70); Rome, Italy
- Occupations: Film director and screenwriter
- Years active: 1955–1966

Ubaldo Ragona (1 December 1916 – 15 August 1987) was an Italian film director and screenwriter.

During his early life, Ragona was very interested in movies and became the director of an Italian cinematography journal "Passo Ridotto".
At the beginning of his career he focused on documentaries, moving to feature films after a period of break.

== Filmography ==
=== Director ===
- Il fiume dei Faraoni (1955) - Documentary
- Baldoria nei Caraibi (1957) - Documentary
- The Last Man on Earth (with Sidney Salkow) (1964)
- Sweet Smell of Love (1966)

=== Screenwriter ===
- Baldoria nei Caraibi (1957) - Documentary
- The Last Man on Earth (1964)
- Sweet Smell of Love (1966)

== Trivia ==
He is brother of cinematographer Claudio Ragona.

He used the alias Ubaldo B. Ragona in some of his movies.
