= Georg Marischka =

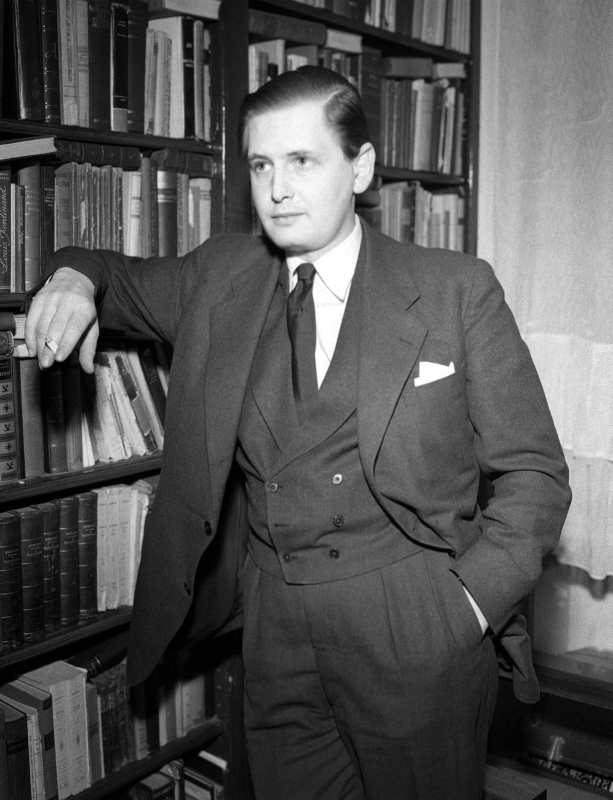
Marischka in 1953

Georg Marischka (29 June 1922 in Vienna – 9 August 1999 in Munich) was an Austrian actor, screen writer, director and film producer for cinema and television.

== Life ==
George Marischka was born into the world of film because his father was Hubert Marischka and Ernst Marischka was his uncle.

In 1949 he worked for Gustav Ucicky as associate director.

One year later he contributed to the screen play of Die Sünderin (The Sinner). Eventually in 1951 he was credited as director for the first time. Afterwards he directed three films starring the Austrian star O. W. Fischer who at that time was very popular in German-speaking countries. This included 1955's Hanussen.

Due to his reputation to be an expert concerning Karl May, he got involved in Karl May movies in the 1960s. When he had written the screenplay for Legacy of the Incas he decided to direct and produce it himself. Since the film was less successful than other Karl May movies, he consequently then concentrated on his career as an actor.

Georg Marischka appeared in many films including international productions like the feature films The Odessa File and The Boys from Brazil. He appeared in Das Blaue Palais and had in particular a reoccurring role as Jutes chief "Yorath" in the British TV series Arthur of the Britons.

Marischka was married to German actress Ingeborg Schöner, with whom he had two daughters.

== Selected filmography ==
=== Director ===
- The Merry Farmer (1951)
- To Be Without Worries (1953)
- Hanussen (1955)
- Peter Voss, Hero of the Day (1959)
- Axel Munthe, The Doctor of San Michele (1962)
- Legacy of the Incas (1965)

=== Screenwriter ===
- The Sinner (1951)
- A Summer You Will Never Forget (1959)
- The Shoot (1964)
- The Treasure of the Aztecs (1965)
- The Pyramid of the Sun God (1965)

=== Actor ===
- Strange City (1972) - Trimborn
- A Free Woman (1972) - Schmollinger
- The Odessa File (1974) - Prosecution Attorney
- Wanted: Babysitter (1975) - Henderson
- 7 morts sur ordonnance (1975) - Paul Brézé
- King Arthur, the Young Warlord (1975) - Yorath, Chief of the Jutes
- Le bon et les méchants (1976) - Le chef de la gestapo
- Dear Fatherland Be at Peace (1976) - Fanzelau
- The Boys from Brazil (1978) - Gunther
- Das Ding (1979, TV Movie) - Public Prosecutor General Wolfgang Trogan
- God Does Not Believe in Us Anymore (1982) - Gross
- Am Ufer der Dämmerung (1983) - Herr Baumann
- Die unglaublichen Abenteuer des Guru Jakob (1983)
- Anna's Mother (1984) - Reporter
- The Devil's Lieutenant (1984) - Weinberger
- Die Story (1984) - Newspaper Editor
- Das Wunder (1985) - TV Priest
- Three Crazy Jerks II (1988) - Dr. Kneitz
- The Rose Garden (1989) - Brinkmann
- Scream of Stone (1991) - Werbeagent
- Schtonk! (1992) - Von Klantz
- The Lucona Affair (1993) - Judge
- Grüß Gott, Genosse (1993) - Ludwig Kattner
