= Reprisal! =

1956 film by George Sherman

- Directed by: George Sherman
- Written by: Arthur Gordon (novel); David P. Harmon; Raphael Hayes; David Dortort
- Produced by: Helen Ainsworth; Lewis J. Rachmil; Guy Madison
- Starring: Guy Madison; Felicia Farr; Kathryn Grant
- Cinematography: Henry Freulich
- Edited by: Jerome Thoms
- Music by: Mischa Bakaleinikoff
- Production company: Romson Productions
- Distributed by: Columbia Pictures
- Release date: November 1956
- Running time: 74 minutes
- Country: United States
- Language: English

Reprisal! is a 1956 American Western film directed by George Sherman and starring Guy Madison, Felicia Farr and Kathryn Grant. The film's sets were designed by the art director Walter Holscher.

== Plot ==
A man named Frank Madden (Guy Madison) buys a ranch near a small town. Greedy neighboring ranchers, the Shipleys, had been grazing their cattle on the ranch while it was setting empty. Madden hires American Indians to help him on the ranch. The townspeople resent him for this. The Shipleys also resent him because they can no longer graze their cattle on his land.

The old Indian, Matara, shows up on Madden's ranch; it becomes apparent that he is actually Madden's grandfather, as Madden is half Indian and has chosen to forsake that heritage to pass as white. He tells Matara to leave but, Matara convinces him to pretend he is his Indian houseman.

Shortly before Madden bought the ranch, the three Shipley brothers had killed the wife of an Indian man named Takola (Philip Breedlove) near a dead tree on the ranch. Takola, who had disappeared after his wife's murder, returns to the hanging tree and sees Madden and, mistaking Madden for one of the Shipleys, takes a shot at him. Madden is not hit and after a minor scuffle Takola tells him about what happened at the tree. Madden tells Takola that as far as he is concerned he never saw Takola there, the shot at him never happened and Takola should never return there.

Romantic feelings begin to blossom between Madden and Catherine Cantrell (Felicia Farr), daughter of the local land agent through whom Madden bought the ranch. Meanwhile, although the Shipleys supposedly hate American Indians, one of the Shipley brothers cheats on his wife with a young Indian woman named Taini (Kathryn Grant). Taini is one of the Indians whom Madden has befriended. This makes the Shipley brother jealous because he thinks that Taini is also having an affair with Madden, although this is not the case.

One Shipley brother sees Madden in the saloon and tries to pick a fight. Madden punches him and walks out into the street. Shipley follows him out of the saloon and calls him out. Madden refuses to turn around, thus daring Shipley to shoot him in the back. Shipley does not dare do this with the whole town watching and Madden walks away.

Takola catches the same Shipley brother, who threatened Madden in town, returning to the ranch one night and shoots him in the back. When Madden comes into town to buy supplies the next day the other Shipley brothers, having just brought their brother's body into town, accuse him of the murder because of the incident in the saloon. They try to shoot him down in the street, but the Sheriff stops them and arrests Madden. The Shipleys go to the saloon and, after several drinks, lead a mob to the jail to lynch Madden. The mob overpowers the Sheriff and begins to lead Madden to the nearest tree with Catherine and the Sheriff begging them to wait for a trial.

Before the mob goes much further, Taini steps in front of them and tells them that Madden could not possibly have shot anyone because he was with her the whole night. This is a lie, but the mob believes it and releases Madden. Catherine also believes it and leaves Madden standing in the street. Madden follows Catherine home and tries to convince her that Taini was lying, but she refuses to believe him because of Taini's bad reputation. As Madden walks down the street to get his belongings from the jail, his grandfather, Matara, arrives in a wagon. As Taini walks up to them, the grandfather shows Madden a pistol that he was going to use to defend Madden after he heard that he was in jail. The Shipley brothers open up on Madden, the grandfather and Tiani. Tiani is hit in the arm, the grandfather is shot in the chest and Madden picks up the pistol and shoots both Shipleys.

Matara dies in Madden's arms. Madden then announces to the whole town that it was his real grandfather and that Madden's American Indian name is Neola. Madden decides to sell the ranch and move on. The Sheriff arrives as he is about to leave and tells him that Taini revealed that she had learned that Takola had shot the Shipley brother and that she also revealed his location to the Sheriff, who had then arrested him. He also says that he will see that Takola gets a fair trial. He goes on to say that he hopes Madden comes back some day because most of the townspeople feel that they had wronged Madden. As Madden turns to ride away Catherine, dressed in traveling clothes, arrives on a horse and after a brief conversation the two ride off together.

== Cast ==
- Guy Madison as Frank Madden aka Neola
- Felicia Farr as Catherine Cantrell
- Kathryn Grant as Taini
- Michael Pate as Bert Shipley
- Edward Platt as Neil Shipley
- Otto Hulett as Sheriff Jim Dixon
- Wayne Mallory as Tom Shipley
- Philip Breedlove as Takola
- Robert Burton as Jeb Cantrell
- Ralph Moody as Matara
- Addison Richards as Judge
- Frank DeKova as Charlie Washackle
- Buddy Roosevelt as Juror
- Ethan Laidlaw as Juror
- Kermit Maynard as Lyncher
- Fred Aldrich as Lyncher
- Malcolm Atterbury as Luther Creel
- John Zaremba as Mr. Willard
- Stuart Holmes as Trial Spectator
- Herman Hack as Blacksmith

== Bibliography ==
- William Hampes. Cowboy Courage: Westerns and the Portrayal of Bravery. McFarland, 2019.
