= Harold's Club =

Casino in Downtown Reno, Nevada

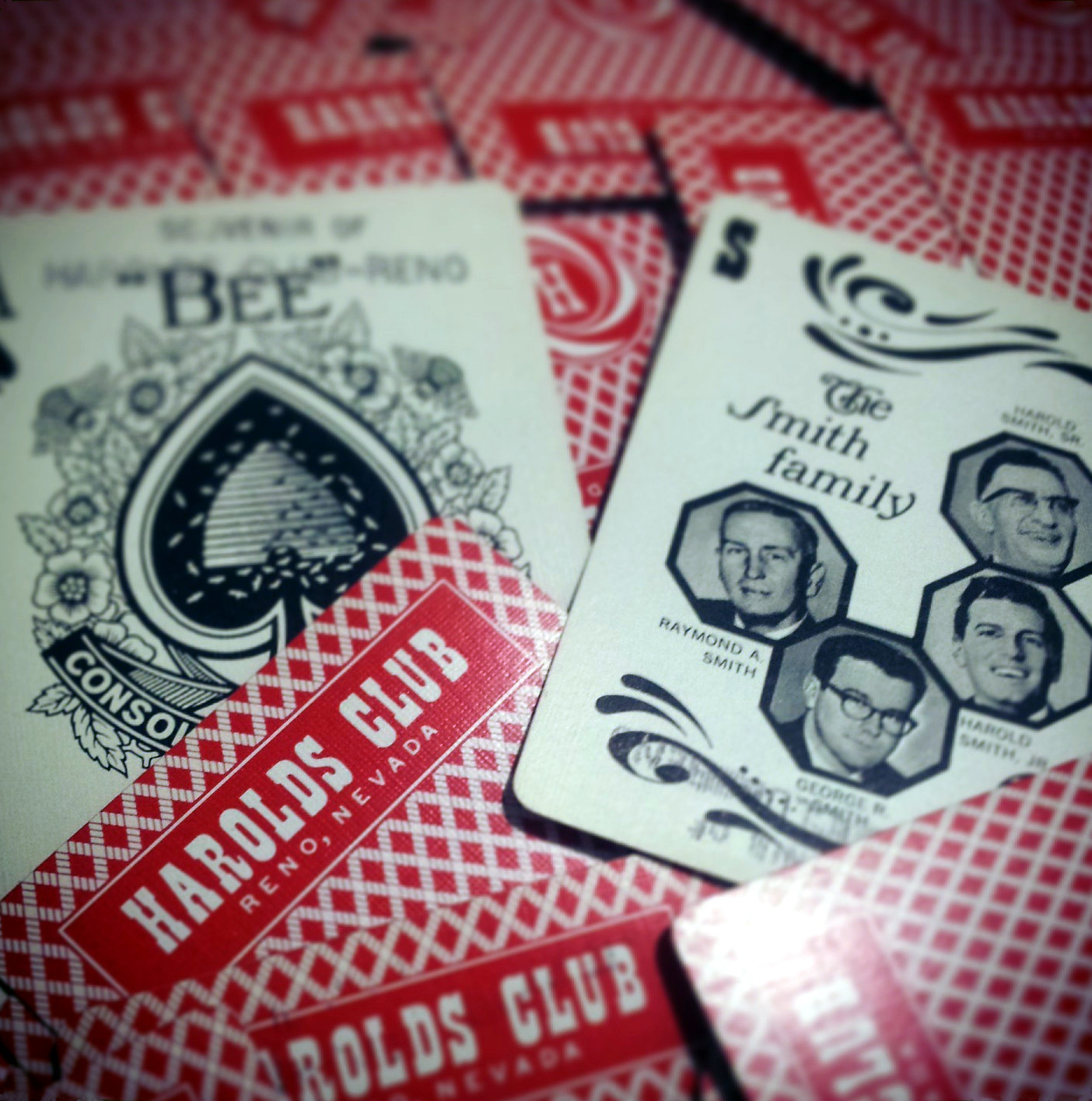
- Harold's Club cards
- Interactive map of Harold's Club
- Location: Reno, Nevada, U.S.; 236 North Virginia Street; 39.527522°N 119.813472°W
- Opened: 1935; 91 years ago
- Closed: 1995; 31 years ago
- Theme: Cowboy
- Owner: Harold Smith; Raymond Smith

Harold's Club, also spelled Harolds Club, was a casino in Downtown Reno, Nevada that was established in 1935. The casino closed in 1995 and the building was demolished in 1999. Harold's Club was the set for the 1955 movie 5 Against the House. An Ocean's 11 predecessor set in Reno, the movie provides the best view of Harold's Club casino.

== History ==
Harold's Club casino was established in 1935 by Harold S. Smith Sr. (1910–1985) and his brother, Raymond A. Smith. Soon afterwards, their father, Raymond I. ("Pappy") Smith (1887–1967), was appointed general manager and became the public face of the casino. The casino expanded by buying adjacent Virginia Street properties. Harold's Club constructed a seven-story building as part of the casino, but never had a hotel on the property. Pappy Smith developed a marketing campaign that made the casino famous, using more than two thousand billboards across the United States advertising "Harold's Club or Bust", often written on a Conestoga wagon. (By the 1970s, most of the billboards had been taken down because of the Highway Beautification Act.)

Harold's Club was sold to Howard Hughes's Summa Corporation in 1970 for $11.5 million. In December 1994, the casino was sold to Gamma International Ltd. and closed three months later. The casino was then sold to Harrah's Reno in 1999 and demolished. The property is now an outdoor plaza for concerts and special events.

The casino building had an American Bandstand restaurant and nightclub for 8 years during the 1990s.

Harold's Club was the target of a casino heist in the 1955 feature film 5 Against the House.

A large 70-by-35-foot (21 by 11 m) mural of Old West pioneer settlers that was in front of the casino is now on display at the Reno Livestock Events Center, about 2 miles (3.2 km) from the old casino location. The mural was designed by Theodore McFallon and constructed by Sargent Claude Johnson.
