= Sandokan Against the Leopard of Sarawak =

- Directed by: Luigi Capuano
- Written by: Emilio Salgari (novel); Luigi Capuano; Arpad DeRiso
- Produced by: Ottavio Poggi; Nino Battiferri
- Starring: Ray Danton; Guy Madison; Franca Bettoia
- Cinematography: Bitto Albertini
- Edited by: Antonietta Zita
- Music by: Carlo Rustichelli
- Production companies: Eichberg-Film; Liber Film
- Distributed by: Omnia-Film
- Release date: 18 October 1964
- Running time: 88 minutes
- Countries: Italy; West Germany
- Language: Italian

Sandokan Against the Leopard of Sarawak (Italian: Sandokan contro il leopardo di Sarawak) is a 1964 historical adventure film directed by Luigi Capuano and starring Ray Danton, Franca Bettoia and Guy Madison. It was made as a co-production between Italy and West Germany. It is based on the series of novels by Emilio Salgari featuring the character of Sandokan, a Malayan pirate.

The film's sets were designed by the art director Giancarlo Bartolini Salimbeni and Massimo Tavazzi.

== Cast ==
- Ray Danton as Sandokan
- Franca Bettoia as Samoa
- Guy Madison as Yanez
- Mario Petri as Sir Charles Brooks
- Alberto Farnese as Tremal Naik
- Mino Doro as Lumbo
- Aldo Bufi Landi as Rajani
- Giulio Marchetti as Sagapar
- Romano Giomini
- Adriano Vitale
- Giuliana Farnese
- Ferdinando Poggi as Assumbata
- Franco Fantasia as Kuron
- Hal Frederick as Kalam

== Bibliography ==
- Goble, Alan. The Complete Index to Literary Sources in Film. Walter de Gruyter, 1999.
