= The Last Frontier (1955 film) =

1955 film

- Directed by: Anthony Mann
- Written by: Philip Yordan; Russell S. Hughes
- Based on: The Gilded Rooster; 1947 novel by Richard Emery Roberts
- Produced by: William Fadiman
- Starring: Victor Mature; Guy Madison; Robert Preston; Anne Bancroft; James Whitmore
- Cinematography: William C. Mellor
- Edited by: Al Clark
- Music by: Leigh Harline
- Production company: Columbia Pictures
- Distributed by: Columbia Pictures
- Release date: December 7, 1955 (New York City)
- Running time: 98 minutes
- Country: United States
- Language: English
- Box office: $1 million (US)

The Last Frontier is a 1955 American Western film directed by Anthony Mann and starring Victor Mature, Guy Madison, Robert Preston, and Anne Bancroft. The film is set during the American Civil War at an isolated army base at the far reaches of the American frontier, where the Indians still far outnumber the whites.

The Last Frontier was filmed in Technicolor and CinemaScope. On television, it has been shown retitled as Savage Wilderness.

== Plot ==
During the American Civil War, fur trappers Jed Cooper, Gus and Mungo are returning from a trapping expedition with a load of furs when they are surrounded by a large party of Indians, who ask them to hand over their guns, which they do. When the Indians ask for more, Gus says to give them their horses and the furs. Jed is reluctant to give away such valuable items but Gus says it is either that or be killed. The Indian chief, Red Cloud, tells them they must leave the land and not return, if they do they will be killed. Mungo says it is because of the soldiers who have built a fort nearby. At Jed's insistence, they head to the fort to get compensation for the stolen skins, though Gus would rather go to Canada, as he doesn't think that soldiers can be trusted.

At the fort, Fort Shallan, they meet Captain Riordan, who is in temporary command since they lost their Colonel. When Jed asks for compensation for all their losses, Riordan offers to recruit the three men as scouts, to which they all, eventually, agree. With their first pay in advance they get drunk, and Jed bursts in on Corrina Marston, asking for more whiskey. He finds a picture of her husband who she says is a Colonel who is currently at Fort Medford. Jed says he has probably been killed by Red Cloud.

After returning to the fort, which he had left without permission, he finds out that Riordan has sent Gus and Mungo to Fort Medford, as the telegraph line has been wrecked and no-one else has been able to get through. Jed thinks it was a suicide mission. He goes looking for them and finds them with what is left of Marston's party from the abandoned Fort Medford. Marston tells Jed to tell Riordan that he will wait where he is until Riordan sends 100 men to him from Fort Shallan. When Jed refuses, Marston says if he disobeys the order, he will have him shot. Just then, the Indians attack. Jed tells Marston if they stay there, they will all be killed. With some of the men urgently in need of a doctor, Marston finally relents and they proceed to Fort Shallan.

While Corrina is pleased that Marston has arrived, he seems less so. He is not happy with the posting, feeling that there is little chance to achieve the glory that is missing from his career. Corinna says she doesn't care, she married a man not a hero.

Marston asks Riordan why he did not send the 100 men he asked for by telegraph. Rioran explains that his orders are to hold the fort, and that his men are mostly raw recruits. If he had sent 100 men to Fort Medford it would have left Fort Shallan with only 40 men and it would have easily been captured by Red Cloud. Marston says they are all going to return to Fort Medford. Riordan says they will lose Fort Shallan and the closest fort will then be Fort Laramie in Wyoming. Marston orders the training of the fort's troops to be doubled. When Riordan objects, saying he is in charge of the fort until there are orders saying differently, Marston states that as senior officer in the territory he is entitled to take command, and unless Riordan accepts this he will be under arrest. Riordan reluctantly acquiesces.

Jed discovers that Red Cloud is gathering a large force of allies and reports to Riordan in the hospital. When Marston arrives Jed says he suspects that if Red Cloud's allies arrive before the snow, which is already late, they will attack the fort. Marston says they will attack red Cloud first. The fort's doctor, Captain Clarke, who is on first name terms with Marston, tells Riordan to stop him. Riordan says Marston is in command. When Clarke continues, Marston reminds him that he is there as a doctor, not a military strategist. Clarke leaves, telling Riordan to ask Marston about Shiloh. Marston tells Riordan he lost 1500 men at Shiloh, and that by the time the report of this reached Washington, he was being referred to as the "Butcher of Shiloh". Corinna, who had been present, leaves, upset with her husbands lack of remorse. As she reaches her quarters, Jed grabs and forcibly kisses her. She tries to reject his advances, but not convincingly. He tells her he can save her from the massacre her husband is leading them into, but she doesn't know how or whether she can help him.

Riordan sends Mungo to Fort Laramie to get orders to keep Marston in the fort all winter. When a water detail leaves to collect water from a stream not far from Red Cloud's camp, Marston tells Jed he wants to see the camp. While the detail returns to the fort, Jed shows Marston the camp. Marston is surprised that there are only 100 men in it. Jed says there are a dozen such camps. Marston thinks that with the water detail, he could have wiped out the entire camp. On their return to their horses, Marston falls into a bear trap. Jed says he will only get Marston out if he promises to not chase Red Cloud and to stay in the fort until winter. Marston refuses. Jed returns to the fort taking Marston's horse with him. Riordan and Clarke both assume Marston is dead, but Jed just says that he lost him. Jed then tells Corinna the same thing, adding that it's what everyone wanted. She says it is, but not in the way it has happened. Angry at her attitude, he hits her and then retrieves Marston.

On returning to the fort, Marston orders every man to be armed and ready to leave the fort in 3 hours. While Marston is addressing the men as they are about to leave the fort, a drunken Jed bursts through the ranks and shouts that they are all going to get killed. He runs out of the fort, shouting for Red Cloud. Just then the Indians attack. Jed kills 3 and manages to get back inside the fort. Sgt Dekker tells Marston that Jed's outburst has unsettled the men. Marston says Dekker should provoke a fight with Jed, which will be a good excuse to get rid of him. After a long fight, which ends in front of the officers and men, Dekker falls off a roof and is killed. Riordan agrees with Marston that the appropriate punishment is hanging. Jed jumps out of the fort, and as he runs away Riordan aims his pistol at him, but does not fire, even though Marston orders him to.

As they prepare to leave the fort, Riordan asks Marston to reconsider. When he doesn't, Riordan places him under arrest, on the authority he expects to get from Fort Laramie. Marston says Riordan will have to shoot him. As Riordan takes aim, Mungo returns from Fort Laramie. Riordan's request is denied, Leaving Marston in charge. Marston leaves with the company, leaving Riordan in charge of the remaining few men at the fort. Mungo finds Jed and tells him Gus is with Marston. He then gives Jed his gun and leaves, saying he belongs in the mountains and Jed does not. Jed finds Red Cloud's war party waiting to ambush Marston's troops. As an Indian is about to shoot Gus, who is scouting the draw ahead, Jed shoots him. Gus heads back towards Marston who orders the cavalry to charge. Gus tells them to go back to the trees, which Marston ignores. Gus is shot and when Jed finds him, he is dead. As the foot soldiers follow the cavalry, Jed runs up and tells them to stay in the trees. As they regroup he tells them to get back to the fort and to not stop for anything. Many of the foot soldiers make it back, but none of the cavalry.

The snows arrive, saving the fort from any more attacks. Riordan makes Jed a sergeant. Jed returns to Corinna.

== Cast ==
- Victor Mature as Jed Cooper
- Guy Madison as Captain Glenn Riordan
- Robert Preston as Colonel Frank Marston
- James Whitmore as Gus
- Anne Bancroft as Corinna Marston
- Russell Collins as Captain Phil Clarke
- Peter Whitney as Sergeant Major Decker
- Pat Hogan as Mungo

== Production ==
The film was originally known as The Gilded Rooster, the title of the 1947 novel on which the script was based. Film rights were acquired by Columbia in 1953. Marlon Brando was sought for the title role. The role was eventually given to Victor Mature who had just signed a two-picture deal with Columbia.

Filming was to have started in January 1955 but this was pushed back, in part so Mature could make Violent Saturday. Production began 21 March 1955 on location in Mexico. And in North America (I.E. background of fort and numerous shots in mountains. Locations unspecified.

Yordan says he rewrote the film coming up with the theme that the Mature character wanted to get into the army so he could woo a woman. "That's the whole picture—about a guy trying to get a blue uniform", he said.

Mann had made a film for Columbia, and the studio wanted the director to make another film for them. Mann selected Last Frontier. He said "I had a terrible time with Victor; he was very ill in Mexico. But it was a terrific idea, helluvan idea, the story of a savage who wants to earn a uniform and who finds out all the bad things about a uniform along with the good, and struggles, and finally wins it... It was an historical fact that we took from, with the actual battle in the dust when all the Indians come down into the valley and the dust filled the valley and you couldn’t see any bluecoats. The dust was so fine in Alexico, you just had to walk and the air was permeated with it. We finally had to wear gas masks to keep our lungs free." Mann had insisted on using Mature. "Everybody said; ‘You’re mad to use Victor,’ but he was the rightest person I knew. And he loved it."

== See also ==
- List of American films of 1955
