= Honeymoon (1947 film) =

1947 comedy film by William Keighley

- Directed by: William Keighley
- Screenplay by: Michael Kanin
- Story by: Vicki Baum
- Produced by: Warren Duff
- Starring: Shirley Temple; Franchot Tone; Guy Madison
- Cinematography: Edward Cronjager
- Edited by: Ralph Dawson
- Music by: Leigh Harline
- Production company: William Keighley Productions
- Distributed by: RKO Radio Pictures
- Release date: May 17, 1947 (U.S.)
- Running time: 74 minutes
- Country: United States
- Language: English
- Budget: $1,739,000

Honeymoon is a 1947 American comedy film directed by William Keighley, starring Shirley Temple, Guy Madison and Franchot Tone.

== Plot ==
Barbara, the sweetheart of a GI corporal, and Phil, elope to Mexico City. Barbara discovers that her boyfriend, stationed in the Panama Canal Zone, not only has his flight been delayed but the two become trapped in bureaucratic red tape, including the need for a doctor's certificate, and may not have their wedding before he has to return to his military base. The US Embassy Vice Consul goes to great lengths to intervene and help the young lovers, but frequent misunderstandings jeopardise his own upcoming marriage, including when Barbara's diving accident in a pool makes her want to pursue him instead.

== Cast ==
- Shirley Temple as Barbara Olmstead
- Franchot Tone as David Flanner
- Guy Madison as Corporal Phil Vaughn
- Lina Romay as Raquel Mendoza
- Gene Lockhart as Consul Prescott
- Corinna Mura as Senora Mendoza
- Grant Mitchell as Congressman Crenshaw
- Julio Villarreal as Senor Gaspar Mendoza
- Manuel Arvide as Registrar

== Production ==
RKO originally planned to obtain the three stars of Since You Went Away from David O. Selznick, however Joseph Cotten refused the role played in the film by Franchot Tone. Production in 1945 Mexico City was delayed by a strike.

The film was William Keighley's first film after his World War II service with the First Motion Picture Unit and after he finished his tenure at Warner Bros.

== Reception ==
According to Variety, the film earned less than $1 million at the box office.

The film recorded a loss of $675,000.
