= Axel Munthe, The Doctor of San Michele =

1962 film

- Directed by: Giorgio Capitani; Rudolf Jugert; Georg Marischka
- Written by: Axel Munthe (novel); Hans Jacoby; Harald G. Petersson
- Based on: The Story of San Michele by Axel Munthe
- Produced by: Artur Brauner
- Starring: O.W. Fischer; Rosanna Schiaffino; Sonja Ziemann; Valentina Cortese
- Cinematography: Richard Angst
- Edited by: Jutta Hering
- Music by: Mario Nascimbene
- Production companies: CCC Film; Criterion Productions; Cine-Italia Film
- Distributed by: Gloria Film
- Release date: 28 September 1962
- Running time: 134 minutes
- Countries: France; Italy; West Germany
- Language: German

Axel Munthe, The Doctor of San Michele (German: Axel Munthe – Der Arzt von San Michele) is a 1962 biographical drama film directed by Giorgio Capitani, Rudolf Jugert and Georg Marischka. It stars O.W. Fischer in the title role along with Rosanna Schiaffino, Sonja Ziemann and Valentina Cortese. It was made as a co-production between France, Italy and West Germany. It is based on the 1929 book The Story of San Michele, the memoirs of the Swedish doctor Axel Munthe.

It was shot at the Spandau Studios in Berlin and on location in Rome and Capri. The film's sets were designed by the art directors Werner Achmann and Willy Schatz. It was made in Eastmancolor. It premiered in Augsburg in September 1962.

== Cast ==
- O.W. Fischer as Axel Munthe
- Rosanna Schiaffino as Antonia
- Sonja Ziemann as Prinzessin Clementine
- María Mahor as Ebba
- Valentina Cortese as Eleonora Duse
- Antoine Balpêtré as Leblanc
- Fernand Sardou as Petit-Piere
- Heinz Erhardt as Brunoni
- Renate Ewert as Patientin
- Ingeborg Schöner as Natasha
- Christiane Maybach as Paulette

== Bibliography ==
- Bergfelder, Tim (2005) [2004]. International Adventures: German Popular Cinema and European Co-productions in the 1960s. New York: Berghahn Books. ISBN 978-1-57181-539-2.
