= The Last Man on Earth (1964 film) =

1964 horror film directed by Sidney Salkow and Ubaldo Ragona

- US film poster by Reynold Brown
- Directed by: Sidney Salkow; Ubaldo B. Ragona
- Screenplay by: Richard Matheson (Note: Credited as "Logan Swanson".); William F. Leicester; Italian version: Furio M. Monetti; Ubaldo B. Ragona
- Based on: I Am Legend (1954 novel) by Richard Matheson
- Produced by: Robert L. Lippert
- Starring: Vincent Price; Franca Bettoia; Emma Danieli; Giacomo Rossi Stuart
- Cinematography: Franco Delli Colli
- Edited by: Gene Ruggiero; Italian version: Franca Silvi
- Music by: Paul Sawtell; Bert Shefter
- Production companies: Associated Producers Inc. Produzioni La Regina
- Distributed by: American International Pictures (U.S.); Indipendenti Regionali (Italy); 20th Century Fox (International); FlashStar Filmes (Brazil)
- Release dates: May 6, 1964 (U.S.); August 19, 1964 (Italy)
- Running time: 86 minutes
- Countries: United States; Italy
- Language: English

The Last Man on Earth (Italian: L'ultimo uomo della Terra) is a 1964 post-apocalyptic science fiction horror film directed by Sidney Salkow and Ubaldo Ragona, based on the 1954 novel I Am Legend by Richard Matheson. It stars Vincent Price and Franca Bettoia, and was produced by Robert L. Lippert. The screenplay was written in part by Matheson, but he was dissatisfied with the result and chose to be credited under the alias "Logan Swanson".

The film was a co-production between the United States and Italy, and was filmed on-location in Rome. It was released in the United States by American International Pictures. In the 1980s, the film entered the public domain.

The Last Man on Earth is the first of three adaptations of Matheson's novel, followed by The Omega Man (1971) and I Am Legend (2007).

== Plot ==
The Last Man on Earth (full movie)

It is 1968, and Dr. Robert Morgan lives in a world where everyone else has been infected by a plague that has turned them into undead, vampiric creatures that cannot stand sunlight, fear mirrors, and are repelled by garlic. They would kill Morgan if they could, but they are weak and unintelligent. Every day Morgan carries out the same routine: He wakes up, marks another day on the calendar, gathers his weapons, and then goes hunting for vampires, killing as many as he can and then burning the bodies to prevent them from coming back. At night, he locks himself inside his house.

A flashback sequence explains that, in December 1965, Morgan's wife Virginia and daughter Kathy had succumbed to the plague before it was widely known by the public that the dead would return to life. Instead of taking his wife to the same public burn pit used to dispose of his daughter's corpse, Morgan buried her without the knowledge of the authorities. When his wife returned to his home and attacked him, Morgan became aware of the need to kill the plague victims with a wooden stake. Morgan hypothesizes that he is immune to the bacteria from a bite by an infected vampire bat when he was stationed in Panama, which may have introduced a diluted form of the plague into his blood.

One day, a dog appears in the neighborhood. Desperate for companionship, Morgan chases after the dog, but does not catch it. Sometime later the dog appears, wounded, at Morgan's doorstep. He takes the dog into his home and treats its wounds, looking forward to having company for the first time in three years. He quickly discovers, however, that it, too, has become infected with the plague. Morgan starts burying the dog, which is now impaled with a wooden stake. He sinks further into depression and loneliness.

After burying the dog, Morgan spots a woman in the distance. The woman, Ruth, is terrified of Morgan at first sight and runs from him. Morgan convinces her to return to his home, but he is suspicious of her true nature. Ruth becomes ill when Morgan waves garlic in her face, but claims that she has a weak stomach. Morgan's suspicion that Ruth is infected is confirmed when he discovers her attempting to inject herself with a combination of blood and vaccine that holds the disease at bay. Ruth initially draws a gun on Morgan, but ultimately surrenders it to him. She tells him that she is part of a group of people like her — infected, but under treatment — and was sent to spy on Morgan. The vaccine allows the people to function normally with the drug in the bloodstream, but once it wears off, the infection takes over the body again. Ruth explains that her people are planning to rebuild society as they destroy the remaining vampires, and that many of those Morgan killed were still alive. Ruth desperately urges Morgan to flee, but he refuses.

While Ruth is asleep, Morgan transfuses his own blood into her. She is immediately cured, and Morgan sees hope that, together, they can cure the rest of her people. Moments later, however, Ruth's people attack. Morgan takes the gun and flees his home while the attackers kill the vampires gathered around Morgan's home. Ruth's people spot Morgan and chase him. He exchanges gunfire with them and picks up tear gas grenades from a police station armory along the way. While the tear gas delays his pursuers somewhat, Morgan is wounded by gunfire and retreats into a church. As he stands at the altar, Morgan denounces his pursuers as "freaks" and one of his pursuers finally impales him with a thrown spear. In his final moments as Ruth cradles him, Morgan laments that his pursuers were afraid of him, then declares that he is the last true man on Earth, before bleeding out. As Ruth walks away from Morgan's body, she notices a baby crying and tries to assure the child that everyone is safe now.

== Cast ==
- Vincent Price as Dr. Robert Morgan
- Franca Bettoia as Ruth Collins
- Emma Danieli as Virginia Morgan
- Giacomo Rossi-Stuart as Ben Cortman
- Umberto Raho as Dr. Mercer
- Christi Courtland as Kathy Morgan
- Antonio Corevi as the governor
- Hector Ribotta as the TV reporter

== Production ==
=== Development ===
Producer Anthony Hinds purchased the rights to Matheson's novel for Hammer Film Productions. Matheson wrote a script, and Hammer announced in 1958 that they would make it. However, British censors would not allow the film to be produced, so Hinds resold the script to American producer Robert L. Lippert.

Lippert had wanted to make a "last man on Earth"-type film for a while. In the late 1950s, Charles Marquis Warren and Robert Stabler optioned a novel by science fiction writer George R. Stewart called Earth Abides. Harry Spalding, who worked for Lippert, said the release of The World, the Flesh and the Devil (1959) killed off plans for that project. Spalding then read Matheson's novel and suggested Lippert film that book instead. The project was announced in August 1962.

Lippert originally told Matheson that Fritz Lang would direct the film, and Matheson thought that would be "wonderful". Eventually, however, Sidney Salkow was chosen to direct. Matheson made the follow-up comment: "Well, there's a bit of a drop."

=== Filming ===
To save money, the film was shot in black and white in Italy with a predominantly Italian cast and crew. Vincent Price and child actress Christi Courtland were the only Americans among the cast. Typically for an Italian production of the time, the film was shot MOS (without sync sound). The Italian cast recited their English dialogue phonetically, and were later dubbed by English-speaking voice actors. Franca Bettoia was dubbed by Carolyn De Fonseca.

Much of the film was shot on the futuristic architecture of the EUR district. Interiors were shot on sets at the Titanus studios. The climax was shot in San Pio X alla Balduina, a Catholic church in Rome.

Matheson later said the film was the most faithful adaptation of his book, but he also called the result "inept" and used a pen name for his screenplay. He later said he thought Harrison Ford as star and George Miller as director would have been the ideal creative combination.

== Release ==
The film was released in the United States by American International Pictures on May 6, 1964. A dubbed version was released in Rome in 1964.

== Home media ==
MGM Home Video, the current owners of the AIP film catalog, released a digitally remastered widescreen version of the film on DVD in September 2005. In 2014, Scream Factory released Blu-ray version in the Vince Price Collection II, which included six other Vincent Price films.

== Reception ==
Although the film was not considered a success upon its release, it later gained a more favorable reputation as a classic of the genre. As of February 2025, The Last Man on Earth holds an 80% rating at the film review aggregator Web site Rotten Tomatoes from 30 reviews. Phil Hall of Film Threat called The Last Man on Earth "the best Vincent Price movie ever made".

Among the less favorable reviews, Steve Biodrowski of Cinefantastique felt the film was "hampered by an obviously low budget and some poorly recorded, post-production dubbing that creates an amateurish feel, undermining the power of its story", while Jonathan Rosenbaum of the Chicago Reader remarked, "Some would consider this version better than the 1971 remake with Charlton Heston, The Omega Man, but that isn't much of an achievement".

=== Creators' response ===
Among the film's creators, Price "had a certain fondness for the film" and felt it was better than The Omega Man.

Richard Matheson co-wrote the film's screenplay, but was unhappy with the results. To keep receiving residual income from the film, though, he had to be credited, so he used the name "Logan Swanson", a combination of his wife's mother's maiden name and his mother's maiden name. Matheson said: "I was disappointed in the film, even though they more or less followed my story. I think Vincent Price, whom I love in every one of his pictures that I wrote, was miscast. I also felt the direction was kind of poor. I just didn't care for it."

== Soundtrack ==
In 2024, Waxwork Records released the soundtrack as part of the Rob Zombie Presents series. It was pressed on coloured vinyl and housed in special packaging featuring artwork by Graham Humphreys.

== See also ==
- List of American films of 1964
- Vampire film
- The Omega Man — a 1971 adaptation of the same novel, starring Charlton Heston
- I Am Legend — a 2007 adaptation of the same novel, starring Will Smith
