= The Inner Circle (1991 film) =

1991 drama film directed by Andrei Konchalovsky

- Theatrical release poster
- Directed by: Andrei Konchalovsky
- Written by: Andrei Konchalovsky; Anatoliy Usov
- Produced by: Claudio Bonivento
- Starring: Tom Hulce; Lolita Davidovich; Bob Hoskins; Aleksandr Zbruyev; Feodor Chaliapin Jr. Bess Meyer
- Cinematography: Ennio Guarnieri
- Edited by: Henry Richardson
- Music by: Eduard Artemyev
- Production companies: Numero Uno International; Mosfilm
- Distributed by: Variety Distribution
- Release date: December 25, 1991
- Running time: 137 minutes
- Countries: United States; Italy; Soviet Union
- Language: English
- Box office: $583,979

The Inner Circle is a 1991 drama film by Russian director Andrei Konchalovsky, telling the story of Joseph Stalin's private projectionist and officer intelligence Ivan Sanchin (real name Alex Ganchin) between 1939 and 1953, the year Stalin died. Sanchin is played by Tom Hulce, and the film co-stars Lolita Davidovitch and Bob Hoskins. The film is based on a true story and is an American, Italian and Russian production. It is in English and has a running time of 137 minutes.

The Inner Circle was nominated for awards at the 42nd Berlin International Film Festival and the 1993 Nika Awards. The film received mixed reviews from critics. Bob Hoskins would later play another important Soviet figure: Nikita Khrushchev in Jean-Jacques Annaud's Enemy at the Gates.

== Plot ==
Shortly after his marriage to Anastasia, Ivan Sanchin, who works as a projectionist at the headquarters of the state security service (called, anachronistically, KGB in the film), is summoned urgently to the Kremlin. Having proved his skill, he is appointed private projectionist to Stalin and his inner circle, including the head of state security Beria. This makes him proud and happy, for he venerates the dictator as if he were a god.

When a Russian Jewish couple in his cramped apartment house are arrested, their little daughter Katya is left behind. Though Anastasia wants to adopt the child, Ivan forbids it because her parents are "enemies of the people”. However she secretly visits Katya at a state orphanage.

As German troops approach Moscow in 1941, Ivan and Anastasia are put on a train to a safe town. Also on the train is Beria, who gets Anastasia drunk and rapes her, sending Ivan back to Moscow. For a long time he hears nothing of her until she turns up one day, pregnant and abandoned. Her experiences have unhinged her and she commits suicide.

In 1953 the lonely Ivan is visited by Katya, now a 17-year-old, who treasures the memory of Anastasia's affection. Ivan offers help, but she says she wants to go her own way. Following Stalin's death, Ivan, while on crowd control duty to masses waiting to view the corpse, sees Katya being jostled in the crush. He rushes in to rescue her and, this time, she is ready to accept his protection.

== Cast ==
- Tom Hulce as Ivan Sanchin
- Lolita Davidovich as Anastasia
- Bob Hoskins as Marshal Lavrentiy Beria
- Aleksandr Zbruyev as Joseph Stalin
- Feodor Chaliapin Jr. as Professor Bartnev
- Bess Meyer as Katya (17 years)
- Mariya Baranova as Katya (10 years)
- Irina Kupchenko as Directress
- Vladimir Kuleshov as Colonel Shchelkasov
- Vsevolod Larionov as General Rumiantsev
- Aleksandr Filippenko as Major Khitrov
- Evdokiya Germanova as Governess

== Reception ==
The film received mixed reviews from critics. Based on 8 reviews collected by Rotten Tomatoes, The Inner Circle has an overall approval rating from critics of 50%, with an average score of 5.40/10.

An academic response from Dr Milena Michalski was unenthusiastic, seeing the film as:

blatantly geared towards a mass audience unfamiliar with the context, whilst having pretensions to higher aims. In this case, the film attempts both to engage in a broad examination of history and to give a more intimate portrayal of personal lives within Stalin's 'inner circle' ….. 'In Stalin's Russia, even an action of love could be an act of treason', but, in the name of a happy ending, love is ultimately shown to triumph over both politics and death, as Ivan comes to understand how misguided he has been.
