= Sandokan to the Rescue (film) =

- Directed by: Luigi Capuano
- Written by: Emilio Salgari (novel); Dietmar Behnke; Luigi Capuano; Arpad DeRiso
- Produced by: Ottavio Poggi
- Starring: Ray Danton; Guy Madison; Franca Bettoia
- Cinematography: Bitto Albertini
- Edited by: Antonietta Zita
- Music by: Carlo Rustichelli
- Production companies: Eichberg-Film; Liber Film
- Release date: 13 August 1964
- Running time: 91 minutes
- Countries: Italy; West Germany
- Language: Italian

Sandokan to the Rescue (Italian: Sandokan alla riscossa) is a 1964 historical adventure film directed by Luigi Capuano and starring Ray Danton, Guy Madison and Franca Bettoia. It was made as a co-production between Italy and West Germany. It is based on the 1907 novel Sandokan to the Rescue by Emilio Salgari featuring the character of Sandokan a Malayan pirate.

The film's sets were designed by the art director Giancarlo Bartolini Salimbeni and Massimo Tavazzi.

== Cast ==
- Ray Danton as Sandokan
- Guy Madison as Yanez
- Franca Bettoia as Samoa
- Mario Petri as William Drook
- Alberto Farnese as Tremal Naik
- Mino Doro as Lumbo
- Giulio Marchetti as Sagapar
- Sandro Moretti as Kammamuri
- Ferdinando Poggi as Teotokris' Complice
- Raf Baldassarre as Teotrokis the Greek
- Isarco Ravaioli as Sitar

== Bibliography ==
- Goble, Alan. The Complete Index to Literary Sources in Film. Walter de Gruyter, 1999.
