= Ferdinando Poggi =

Italian actor (1928–2011)

Ferdinando Poggi (9 September 1928 – 22 October 2011) was an Italian-born actor active between 1958 and 1985. Best known for his role as Castor in the 1963 film Jason and the Argonauts, he also acted in and was stunt coordinator for Clash of the Titans as well as several Italian language films.

Poggi died on 22 October 2011, aged 83.

== Selected filmography ==
- Kidnapped to Mystery Island (1964)
- Sandokan to the Rescue (1964)
- Sandokan Against the Leopard of Sarawak (1964)
