= Renegade Riders =

1967 film

Payment in Blood
- Directed by: Enzo G. Castellari
- Screenplay by: Tito Carpi; Enzo G. Castellari
- Story by: Marino Girolami
- Starring: Edd Byrnes; Ennio Girolami; Luisa Baratto; Piero Vida; Guy Madison
- Cinematography: Aldo Pennelli
- Edited by: Antonietta Zita
- Music by: Francesco De Masi
- Production companies: Circus Film; Fono Roma; St. Regis Film International
- Distributed by: Indipendenti Regionali
- Release date: 1967
- Country: Italy

Payment in Blood (Italian: Sette winchester per un massacro, lit. 'Seven Winchesters for a Massacre') is a 1967 Italian Spaghetti Western film. It represents the official film debut for director Enzo G. Castellari of Few Dollars for Django. The film stars Edd Byrnes and Guy Madison.

== Plot ==
Following the American Civil War a bunch of deserter Confederate soldiers dwell in Mexico and make a living on terrorising the villages around. Bounty hunter Stuart and his assistant Manuela put a crackdown on these misdeeds.

== Cast ==
- Edd Byrnes as Stuart
- Guy Madison as Colonel Thomas Blake
- Ennio Girolami as Chamaco Gonzales
- Luisa Baratto as Manuela
- Federico Boido as Fred

== Production ==
Payment in Blood was described by Italian film historian Roberto Curti as Castellari's "official" debut, as it was the first time the director was credited as a director after going uncredited on films such as Some Dollars for Django and A Ghentar si muore facile. The film was shot in Spain with Castellari intentionally trying to duplicate the style of a film that made an impression on him, Sidney J. Furie's The Appaloosa.

== Releases ==
Payment in Blood passed the Italian censors on 29 March 1967. It was first released in 1967.

== Reception ==
In contemporary reviews, "Murf." of Variety described Payment in Blood as "a gamy slapdash and overly violent Civil War oater drama, made by crude Italian film hands and probably exported in hopes that names of Edd Byrnes and Guy Madison might have the b.o prospects."
