= Helen Ainsworth =

American actress

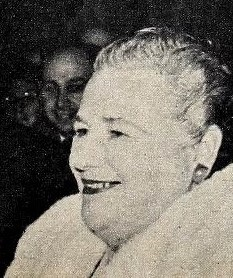
- Ainsworth in 1954
- Born: Helen Shumate; October 10, 1901; San Jose, California, U.S.
- Died: August 18, 1961 (aged 59); Hollywood, California, U.S.
- Other name: Cupid Ainsworth
- Occupation: Actress
- Years active: 1929–1961

Helen Ainsworth (born Helen Shumate; October 10, 1901 – August 18, 1961), also known as Cupid Ainsworth, was a stage and motion picture actress.

== Early years ==
Born Helen Shumate, in San Jose, California, she was the only child of Albert and Ida Shumate. Her father was the school superintendent in San Jose before he joined a company that published college textbooks. Ainsworth attended Madam Plesse's School for Girls in Seattle and studied journalism at Mills College in Oakland.

== Career ==
Ainsworth began her career doing a song-and-dance act with a man. After a producer saw her perform, she gained a part in a play, earning $85 per week. She went to Los Angeles as a comedienne, dancer, and singer when she was 19 years old. In Hollywood, she acted for RKO-Pathé studios and had her own radio progran on NBC.

Dancer Robert Galer and Ainsworth formed a partnership to operate a hat shop on Hollywood's Sunset Strip. Among their customers were film celebrities and studios, including providing all of the hats for Gone with the Wind. The company expanded to six locations before adding a wholesale operation that supplied hats to May department stores. Ainsworth and Gaier eventually sold the operation to a New York designer.

After selling the hat company, Ainsworth became an agent. She headed the West Coast office of the National Concert and Artists Corporation for almost five years. Actors represented by her included Guy Madison, Marilyn Monroe, Rhonda Fleming, Carol Channing and Howard Keel. Her agency was in Beverly Hills.

Madison and Ainsworth formed Romson Productions to make films. Initial plans had the company making six full-length features in 1956. Films produced by Ainsworth included The 27th Day. Ainsworth also headed the Helen Ainsworth Corporation, which distributed films and television programs.

== Death ==
Ainsworth died on August 18, 1961, aged 59, from undisclosed causes.

== Filmography ==
=== Actress ===
- Big News (1929)
- Skinner Steps Out (1929) uncredited
- Dance With Me (1930)
- The Tip-Off (1931)
- No More Bridge! (1934)
- The Big Broadcast of 1937 (1936)
- Gold Mine in the Sky (1938)
- Cafe Society (1939) uncredited
- The Doctor Takes a Wife (1940) uncredited
- You're the One (1941)
- The Lady is Willing (1942) uncredited

=== Producer ===
- 5 Against the House (1955) (associate producer)
- Zane Grey Theater (1956)
- Reprisal! (1956) (associate producer)
- The 27th Day (1957)
- The Hard Man (1957)
- Bullwhip (1958)

=== Writer ===
- Zane Grey Theater (1956)
- Jericho (1961)
