= The Adventurer of Tortuga =

1965 film by Luigi Capuano

L'avventuriero della tortuga
- Directed by: Luigi Capuano
- Written by: Emilio Salgari, Luigi Capuano
- Music by: Carlo Rustichelli
- Release date: 13 August 1965
- Country: Italy
- Language: Italian

The Adventurer of Tortuga (Italian: L'avventuriero della tortuga) is a 1964 Italian historical film directed by Luigi Capuano, released in 1965. It is based on the novel by Emilio Salgari.

== Cast ==
Actor	Role
Guy Madison	Alfonso di Montélimar
Ingeborg Schöner	Soledad Quintero
Rik Battaglia	Pedro Valverde
Nadia Gray	Dona Rosita
Andrea Aureli	Enrico Vallejo
Aldo Bufi Landi	Mendoza
Mino Doro	Tarsarios
Linda Sini	Paquita
Giulio Marchetti	father of the bride
Giulio Battiferri	filibuster Pen
Riccardo Pizzuti	filibuster
