= 5 Against the House =

1955 American heist film

- Theatrical release poster
- Directed by: Phil Karlson
- Screenplay by: Stirling Silliphant; William Bowers; John Barnwell; Frank Tashlin (uncredited)
- Based on: the novel 5 Against the House by Jack Finney
- Produced by: Stirling Silliphant; John Barnwell
- Starring: Guy Madison; Kim Novak; Brian Keith
- Cinematography: Lester White
- Edited by: Jerome Thoms
- Music by: George Duning
- Color process: Black and white
- Production company: Dayle Production
- Distributed by: Columbia Pictures
- Release date: June 10, 1955 (New York City)
- Running time: 83 minutes
- Country: United States
- Language: English

5 Against the House is a 1955 American heist film directed by Phil Karlson and starring Guy Madison, Kim Novak, Brian Keith and William Conrad. The screenplay is based on Jack Finney's 1954 novel of the same name, later serialized by Good Housekeeping magazine. The film centers on a fictional robbery of Harold's Club, a real Reno casino.

== Plot ==
Four friends enrolled at Midwestern University—Brick, Al, Ronnie and Roy—visit the Harold's Club casino in Reno, Nevada, during a weekend trip. After an hour of gambling and socializing, Ronnie is broke. He and Roy go to the cashier's window to cash a check, but the cashier is being threatened by a would-be robber with a gun. Using a concealed alarm button, the cashier alerts casino security, who apprehend the man. They mistake Roy and Ronnie for his accomplices, but Al persuades them to release his friends. Ronnie overhears one of the officers boast that a successful heist of Harold's is impossible.

Ronnie becomes intrigued by the challenge, though his family is wealthy and he does not need the money. Back at school, he develops a plan to rob the casino. Al reestablishes his relationship with his girlfriend Kay, who recently has become a singer at a local nightclub. Al wants to get married, but Kay is hesitant to commit herself. Brick, a Korean War veteran battling post-traumatic stress disorder, fights and nearly kills another student before Al stops him. Al, a fellow soldier whose life Brick saved, urges Brick to return to a veterans' hospital for more treatment, but he refuses, claiming he is getting better on his own.

Ronnie recruits Brick and Roy for the robbery. He maintains that all the money would be returned and thus they would not have committed a crime. Ronnie purchases an untraceable trailer and car and builds a cart that is identical to the cash carts used at Harold's. He states that he needs four people. However, Brick, Roy and Ronnie agree that Al would not get involved if he knew what they intended to do. The day before the robbery, Al proposes to Kay, and she finally accepts. They join the others on a return trip to Reno so they can get married quickly.

Inside the trailer on the long drive, Ronnie informs Al and Kay about the heist. They are shocked and refuse to participate. When they stop by the roadside, the increasingly unstable Brick brandishes a revolver and threatens to kill Al if anyone attempts to sabotage the plan. Brick also announces a change: the money will not be returned.

Reno's casinos are filled with costumed partiers celebrating Thanksgiving. In disguise, Brick, Ronnie and Al blend into the crowd and detain casino employee Eric Berg. Berg is told that a short, armed accomplice is hiding inside the cart they have substituted for Berg's and will shoot him if he disobeys their orders. Actually, there is only a tape recorder inside with prerecorded threats that are played at the push of a hidden button, convincing Berg that the accomplice is real. Berg is told to go to the cash room and get money put into a bag, supposedly for the manager. However, after getting the money, he throws the cart down a flight of stairs and raises the alarm, causing the men to flee. Brick grabs the bag and abandons the others when Ronnie insists on ending the caper and returning the cash. Al pursues Brick into an automated parking garage. Kay alerts the police about the situation and persuades them to not shoot to give Al a chance to save his friend. A tense standoff ensues before Al manages to convince Brick to surrender.

== Cast ==
- Guy Madison as Al Mercer
- Kim Novak as Kay Greylek (singing voice dubbed by Jo Ann Greer)
- Brian Keith as Brick
- Kerwin Mathews as Ronnie
- Alvy Moore as Roy
- William Conrad as Eric Berg
- Jack Dimond as Francis Spiegelbauer
- Jean Willes as Virginia

== Production ==
The film was based on a novel by Jack Finney, which was published in 1954. Stirling Silliphant optioned the book himself, using proceeds from the sale of the rights to his novel Maracaibo. The film was to be made at United Artists with Frank Tashlin as director and Mary Costa in a starring role. However, negotiations with the studio collapsed, and Tashlin and Costa withdrew. By October 1954, negotiations were under way at Columbia with Peter Godfrey to direct and Milly Vitale to star alongside Guy Madison, Alvy Moore, Roddy McDowall and Robert Horton. Eventually Vitale, McDowall and Horton withdrew, and some parts were taken by contract Columbia players such as Kim Novak and Kerwin Mathews.

The role was one of Novak's earliest screen appearances. She was among the final group of actors to be signed to a studio contract and recruited through the previous studio system. Harry Cohn of Columbia insisted upon casting Novak. Silliphant later said, "Who cared? She couldn't act but the role didn't require a Shakespearean capability. All she had to do was slink and roll those eyes."

== Reception ==
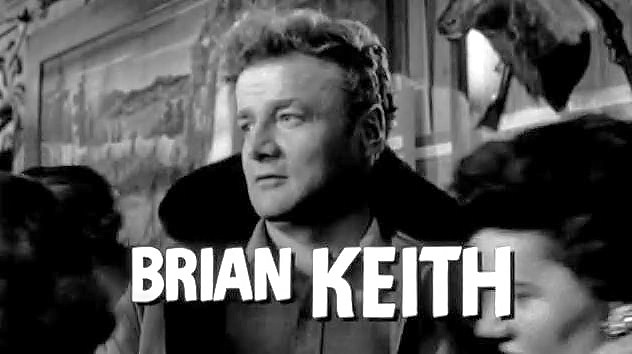
Brian Keith in the trailer

In a contemporary review for The New York Times, critic A. H. Weiler wrote: "[B]risk direction, crisp, idiomatic and truly comic dialogue and a story line that suffers only from some surface characterizations make these 'Five Against the House' absorbing crew. ... Although their motivations would appear to be somewhat fragile, director Phil Karlson has given his melodrama mounting tension as the hold-up plan is unfolded and suddenly builds from a theoretical challenge to frightening reality."

5 Against the House has also received positive reviews from more recent critics and film historians. Leonard Maltin gives it three (out of four) stars, praising it as a credible "perfect crime" genre-piece and noting how the "execution of (the) robbery, along with gorgeous Novak, keep this film rolling along." Similarly, David Thomson in his New Biographical Dictionary of Film calls the film "one of the most exciting planned-crime films, aided by the sultry presence of a young Kim Novak."

== Home media ==
On November 3, 2009, Sony Pictures released the film on DVD as a part of its Film Noir Classics, Volume I collection. The set includes film introductions and commentaries by directors Martin Scorsese, Michael Mann and Christopher Nolan as well as authors Eddie Muller and James Ellroy.

On July 16, 2019, Kit Parker Films released the film in the U.S. on Blu-ray disc as part of its set Noir Archive Volume 2: 1954–1956. No bonus material was included. On November 30, 2020, the UK's Powerhouse Films, through its Indicator label, released the film as part of its six-film Blu-ray disc set Columbia Noir #1 with commentary by film critic David Jenkins, a Three Stooges comedy short titled Sweet and Hot and a 67-minute video interview with Novak recorded at the National Film Theater in London in 1997.

== See also ==
- List of American films of 1955
