= Luigi Capuano =

Italian film director (1904–1979)

- Born: 13 July 1904; Naples, Italy
- Died: 20 October 1979 (aged 75)
- Occupations: Film director, screenwriter
- Years active: 1947–1971

Luigi Capuano (13 July 1904 – 20 October 1979) was an Italian film director and screenwriter. Born in Naples, he directed 43 films between 1947 and 1971. He sometimes used the pseudonym Lewis King.

== Biography ==
Luigi Capuano was born on 13 July 1904 and served as a pilot during World War II. After returning from the war, he worked as a sports journalist.

== Selected filmography ==
- Vertigine d'amore (1949)
- Flying Squadron (1949)
- Stormbound (1950)
- The Lovers of Ravello (1951)
- What Price Innocence? (1952)
- Beauties in Capri (1952)
- Tragic Ballad (1954)
- Letter from Naples (1954)
- New Moon (1955)
- Mermaid of Naples (1956)
- The Knight of the Black Sword (1956)
- Serenata a Maria (1957)
- Il Conte di Matera (1957)
- World of Miracles (1959)
- Queen of the Pirates (1960)
- Terror of the Red Mask (1960)
- Sword in the Shadows (1961)
- The Vengeance of Ursus (1961)
- Revenge of the Conquered (1961)
- Tiger of the Seven Seas (1962)
- The Executioner of Venice (1963)
- Zorro and the Three Musketeers (1963)
- The Lion of St. Mark (1963)
- La vendetta dei gladiatori (1964)
- Sandokan to the Rescue (1964)
- Sandokan Against the Leopard of Sarawak (1964)
- Hercules and the Black Pirates (1964)
- Kidnapped to Mystery Island (1964)
- The Adventurer of Tortuga (1965)
