= The Executioner of Venice =

- Directed by: Luigi Capuano
- Written by: Luigi Capuano; Milton Krims; Ottavio Poggi
- Produced by: Ottavio Poggi
- Starring: Lex Barker; Guy Madison; Alessandra Panaro
- Cinematography: Alvaro Mancori
- Edited by: Antonietta Zita
- Music by: Carlo Rustichelli
- Release date: 1963
- Language: Italian

The Executioner of Venice (Italian: Il boia di Venezia), also known as Blood of the Executioner, is a 1963 Italian swashbuckler film co-written and directed by Luigi Capuano and starring Lex Barker and Guy Madison.

== Cast ==
- Lex Barker as Sandrigo Bembo
- Guy Madison as Rodrigo Zeno
- Alessandra Panaro as Leonora Danin
- Mario Petri as Boia Guarnieri
- Alberto Farnese as Michele Arcà
- Giulio Marchetti as Bartolo
- Feodor Chaliapin Jr. as Doge Giovanni Bembo
- Franco Fantasia as Pietro
- Raf Baldassarre as Messere Grimani
- Mirella Roxy as Smeralda
- John Bartha as Messere Leonardo
