= Poker with Pistols =

1967 film

- Directed by: Giuseppe Vari
- Written by: Augusto Caminito; Fernando Di Leo
- Starring: George Hilton; George Eastman
- Cinematography: Angelo Lotti
- Edited by: Renzo Lucidi
- Music by: Coriolano Gori
- Release date: 1967
- Country: Italy
- Language: Italian

Poker with Pistols (Italian: Un poker di pistole) is a 1967 Italian Spaghetti Western film directed by Giuseppe Vari.

== Cast ==
- George Hilton as Ponson
- George Eastman as Lucas
- Annabella Incontrera as Lola
- Mimmo Palmara as Master
- José Torres as Lazar
