= Guy Madison =

American actor (1922–1996)

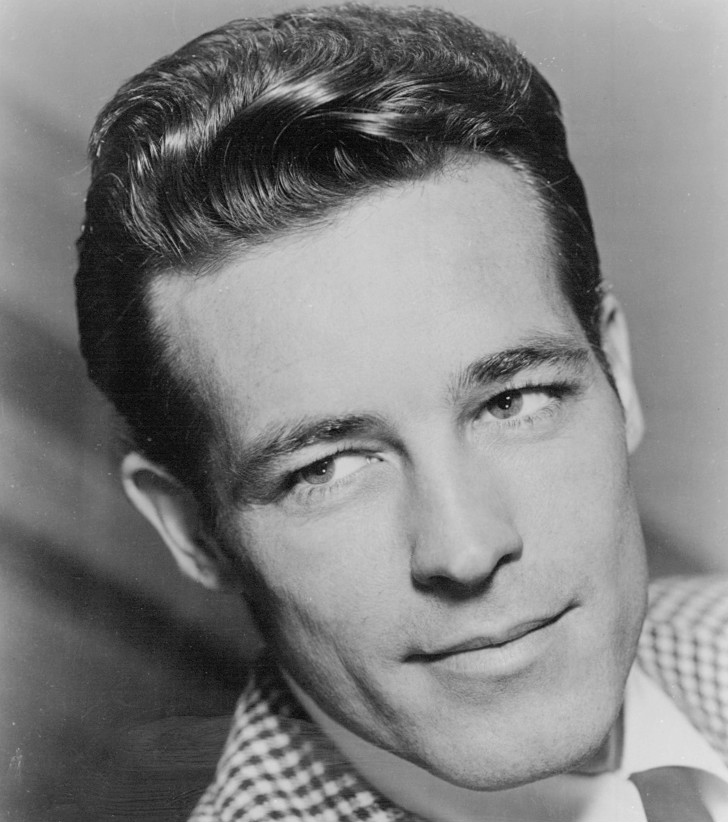
- Madison in 1957
- Born: Robert Ozell Moseley; January 19, 1922; Pumpkin Center, Kern County, California, U.S.
- Died: February 6, 1996 (aged 74); Palm Springs, California, U.S.
- Resting place: Forest Lawn Memorial Park, Cathedral City, California
- Education: Bakersfield College
- Occupation: Actor
- Years active: 1944–1989
- Spouses: Gail Russell (m. 1949; div. 1954) Sheila Connolly (m. 1954; div. 1964)
- Children: 4
- Relatives: Wayne Mallory (brother)
- Awards: Hollywood Walk of Fame

Guy Madison (born Robert Ozell Moseley; January 19, 1922 – February 6, 1996) was an American film, television, and radio actor. He is best known for having played Wild Bill Hickok in the Western television series The Adventures of Wild Bill Hickok from 1951 to 1958.

During his career, Madison was given a special Golden Globe Award in 1954 and two stars (radio, television) on the Hollywood Walk of Fame in 1960.

== Early life ==
Madison was born January 19, 1922, in Pumpkin Center, California. He attended Bakersfield College, a junior college, for two years and then worked briefly as a telephone lineman before joining the United States Navy in 1942 during World War II. He had three brothers, Wayne, Harold, and David, and a sister, Rosemary. Wayne Moseley was an actor, using the stage name Wayne Mallory.

== Career ==
=== David O. Selznick ===
In 1944, Madison was visiting Hollywood on leave when his boyish good looks and physique caught the eye of Henry Willson, the head of talent at David O. Selznick's newly formed Vanguard Pictures. Willson was widely known for his stable of good-looking young actors with unusual names that he had bestowed upon them, and he immediately rechristened Moseley as Madison and cast him in a bit part as a sailor in Selznick's Since You Went Away (1944).

Although Madison was on the screen for only three minutes, the studio received thousands of letters from fans wanting to know more about him. He received extensive coverage in the influential fan magazines of the time, including Photoplay where his agent Henry Willson had once worked.

=== RKO ===
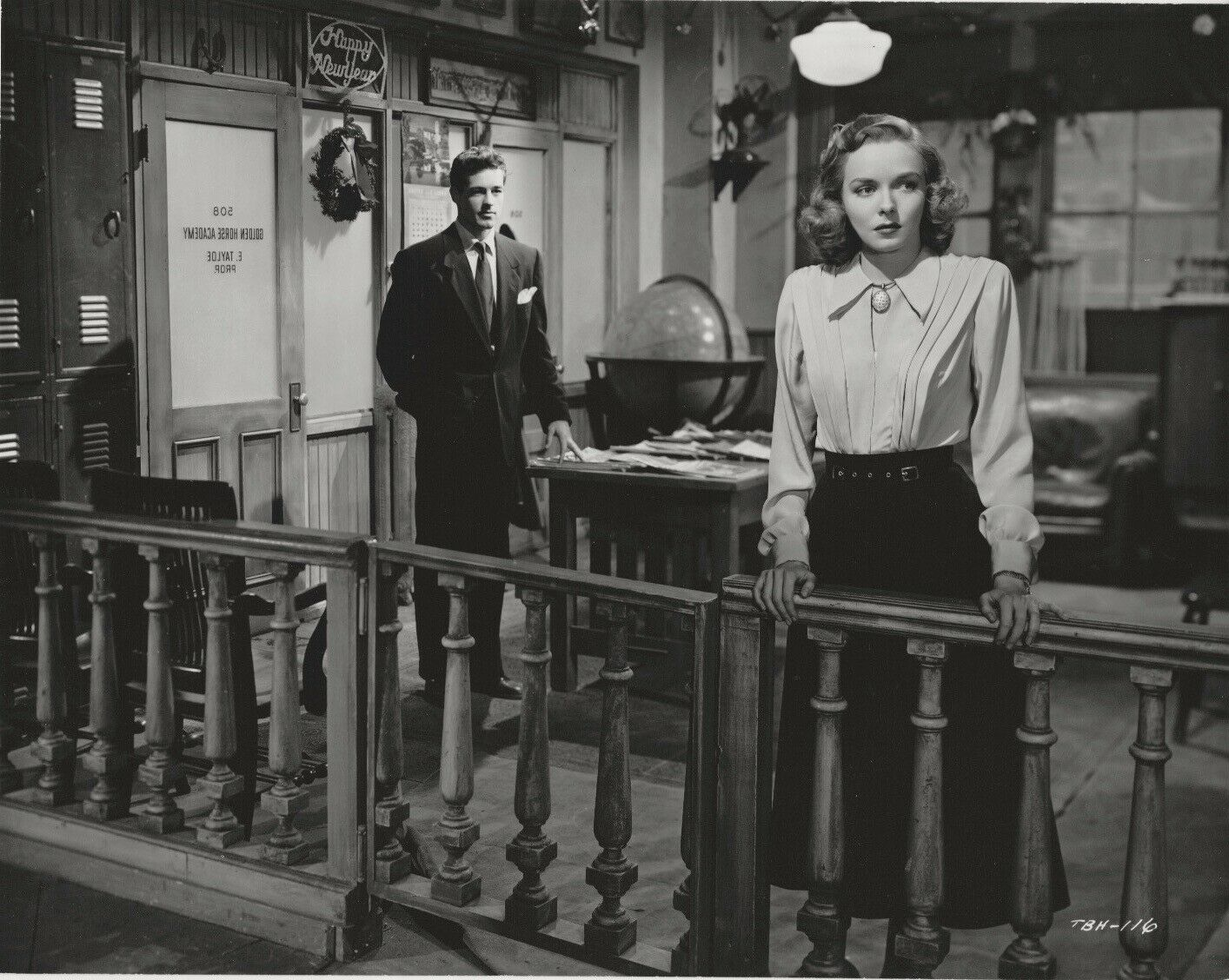
Guy Madison and Diana Lynn in Texas, Brooklyn & Heaven, 1948

Madison returned to military service. When he got out, Selznick assigned his contract to RKO Pictures. RKO gave him a starring role in Till the End of Time, a drama about veterans returning after World War II (1946). The film was a big hit, although it was overshadowed by The Best Years of Our Lives, a film on a similar theme. However, Madison's acting was criticized as wooden.

Madison's second starring role paired him with fellow Selznick contract player Shirley Temple in Honeymoon (1947), which was a huge flop. His career began to suffer, in part because of his limited acting ability.

Madison was borrowed by William Castle for Texas, Brooklyn & Heaven (1948). He also appeared in Massacre River (1949) and Drums in the Deep South (1951).

=== The Adventures of Wild Bill Hickok ===
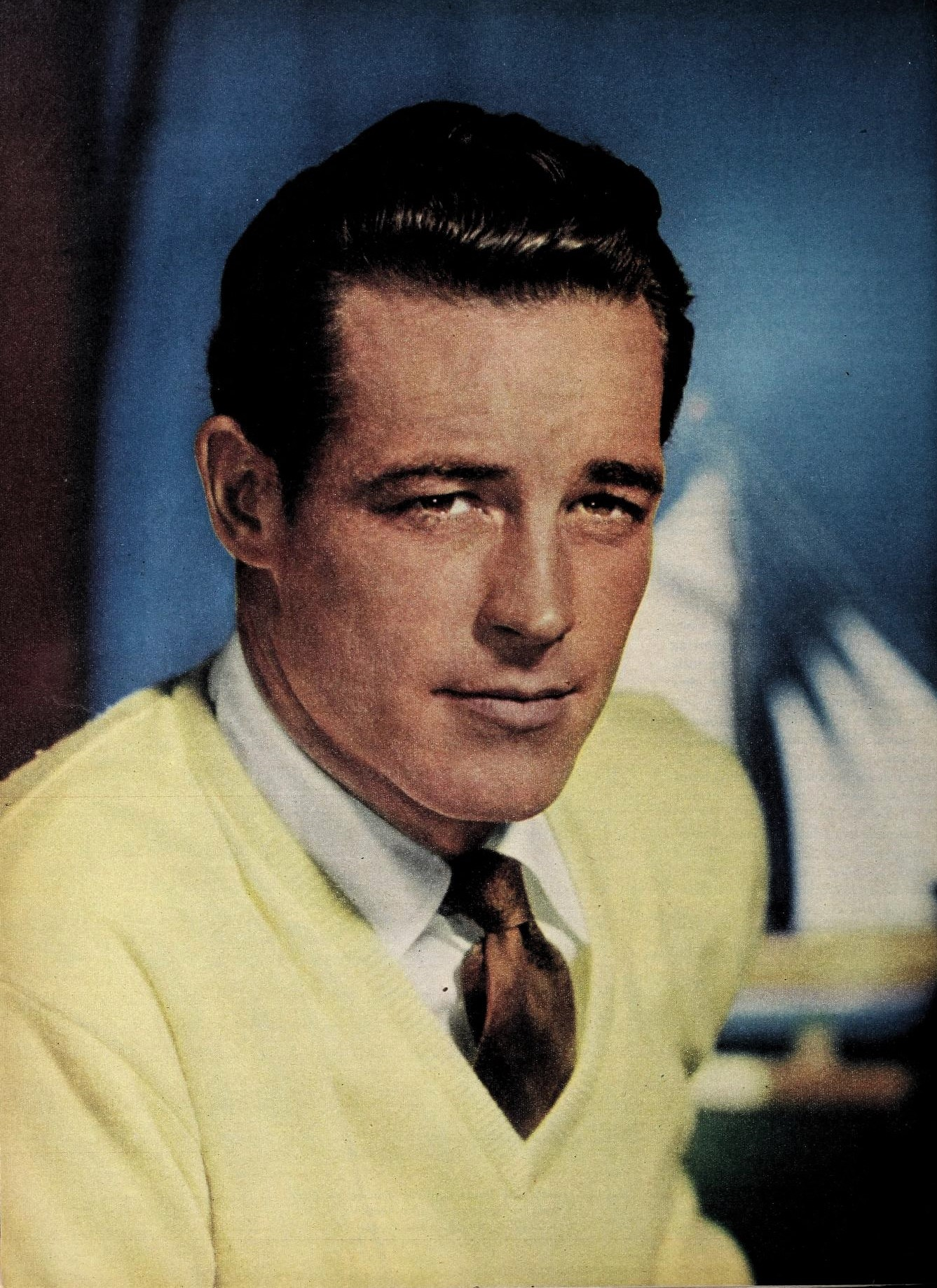
Guy Madison by Don Ornitz, 1954

Madison was eventually dropped by Selznick, along with most of Selznick's contract-players. In 1951 he was cast as the title character in the television series The Adventures of Wild Bill Hickok (1951–58), co-starring Andy Devine as his pal, Pete "Jingles" Jones. During the run of the show, between 1952 and 1955, sixteen feature films were released by Monogram Pictures consisting of episodes combined into a continuous story.

During its run, Madison also continued to make features: Red Snow (1952), a war movie for Columbia; The Charge at Feather River (1953), a Warner Brothers Western for Fox in 3-D and a huge hit; The Command (1954), another popular Western for Warner; 5 Against the House (1955), for Columbia; The Last Frontier (1955), supporting Victor Mature; On the Threshold of Space (1955), a science fiction film for Fox; Hilda Crane (1956), a melodrama for Fox; The Beast of Hollow Mountain (1957), shot in Mexico; The Hard Man (1957), a Western; and Bullwhip (1958), another Western.

=== Europe ===
Madison went to Britain for Jet Over the Atlantic (1959) then went to Europe, where he found greater success in sword-and-sandal, spaghetti Western and macaroni combat films. He went to Italy for Slave of Rome (1961), Sword of the Conqueror (1961), Women of Devil's Island (1962), and The Executioner of Venice (1963).

Madison went to Germany for Old Shatterhand (1964) then made a spaghetti Western, Gunmen of the Rio Grande (1964). He did Kidnapped to Mystery Island (1964), Gentlemen of the Night (1964), The Adventurer of Tortuga (1964), Legacy of the Incas (1965), Renegade Riders (1967), and Son of Django (1967).

He made Bang Bang Kid (1967), The Devil's Man (1967), Superargo and the Faceless Giants (1968), Long Days of Hate (1968), Hell in Normandy (1968), Battle of the Last Panzer (1969), and Reverend's Colt (1970).

== Personal life ==
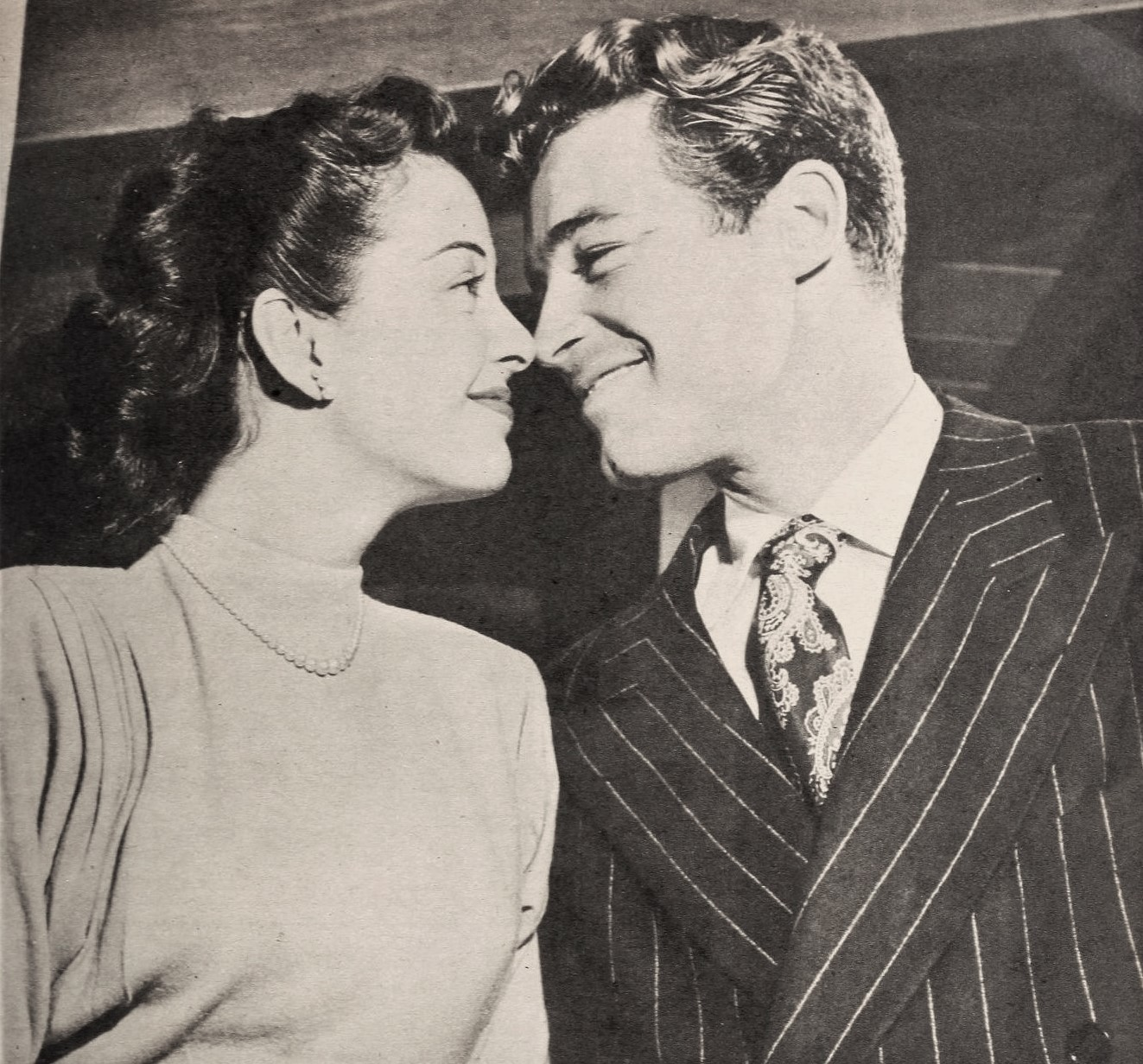
Gail Russell (left), future wife of Guy Madison (right) April 1946

Madison married the actress Gail Russell in 1949. They separated in 1953 and divorced in October 1954.

Later that month, Madison married actress Sheila Connolly in Juarez, Mexico. They had three daughters: Bridget, Erin, and Dolly. They separated in November 1960 and divorced in April 1963. He had an affair with Gia Scala and, before her death, she made him the beneficiary to her portion of the Screen Actors Pension Fund. He had a son, Robert Madison, who also became an actor.

== Death ==
Following his retirement, Madison built a large ranch home in Morongo Valley, California. He died of emphysema at the Desert Hospital Hospice in Palm Springs, California, on February 6, 1996, at the age of 74. He is buried at Forest Lawn Cemetery in Cathedral City, California. His friend, actor turned stockbroker Don Burnett (Scala’s ex-husband), spoke at his funeral.

== Recognition ==
For his contribution to the radio and television industries, Madison has two stars on the Hollywood Walk of Fame. The star for his contributions to radio is located at 6933 Hollywood Boulevard; the star for his television contributions is located at 6333 Hollywood Boulevard

In 1996, a Golden Palm Star was dedicated to Madison on the Palm Springs Walk of Stars.

== Filmography ==
Film
Year	Title	Role	Notes
1944	Since You Went Away	Sailor Harold E. Smith	
1946	Till the End of Time	Cliff W. Harper	
1947	Honeymoon	Corporal Phil Vaughn	
1948	Texas, Brooklyn & Heaven	Eddie Tayloe	Alternative title: The Girl from Texas
1949	Massacre River	Lieutenant Larry Knight	
1951	Drums in the Deep South	Major Will Denning	
1952	Smoky Canyon	Henchman	Uncredited
1952	Red Snow	Lieutenant Phil Johnson	
1953	The Charge at Feather River	Miles Archer	
1954	The Command	Captain Robert MacClaw	
1955	5 Against the House	Al Mercer	
1955	The Last Frontier	Capt. Glenn Riordan	Alternative title: Savage Wilderness
1956	On the Threshold of Space	Capt. Jim Hollenbeck	
1956	Hilda Crane	Russell Burns	
1956	The Beast of Hollow Mountain	Jimmy Ryan	
1956	Reprisal!	Frank Madden aka Neola	Executive producer
1957	The Hard Man	Steve Burden	
1958	Bullwhip	Steve Daley	
1959	Jet Over the Atlantic	Brett Murphy	
1961	Slave of Rome	Marco Valerio	Alternative titles: La schiava di Roma, Slave Warrior
1961	Sword of the Conqueror	Amalchi	Alternative title: Rosmunda e Alboino
1962	Women of Devil's Island	Henri Vallière	Alternative title: Le prigioniere dell'isola del diavolo
1963	The Executioner of Venice	Rodrigo Zeno	Alternative titles: Il boia di Venezia; Blood of the Executioner
1964	Old Shatterhand	Capt. Bradley	Alternative titles: Shatterhand; Apaches' Last Battle
1964	Sandokan to the Rescue	Yanez	
1964	Sandokan Against the Leopard of Sarawak	Yanez	Alternative title: Throne of Vengeance
1964	Gunmen of the Rio Grande	Wyatt Earp / Laramie	
1964	Kidnapped to Mystery Island	Souyadhana	Alternative title: I misteri della giungla nera
1964	Gentlemen of the Night	Massimo Tiepolo	Alternative title: Il vendicatore mascherato
1965	The Adventurer of Tortuga	Alfonso di Montélimar	Alternative title: L'avventuriero della tortuga
1965	Legacy of the Incas	Jaguar / Karl Hansen	Alternative titles: Das Vermächtnis des Inka; Viva Gringo
1966	Five for Revenge	Tex	Alternative title: I cinque della vendetta
1967	LSD Flesh of Devil	Rex Miller	Alternative title: LSD – Inferno per pochi dollari
1967	Renegade Riders	Col. Thomas Blake	Alternative title: Sette winchester per un massacro
1967	Son of Django	Father Fleming	Alternative titles: Il figlio di Django; Return of Django
1967	Bang Bang Kid	Bear Bullock	Alternative titles: The Bang-Bang Kid; Bang, Bang
1968	Superargo and the Faceless Giants	Prof. Wendland Wond	Alternative title: The King of Criminals
1968	Long Days of Hate	Martin Benson	Alternative title: I lunghi giorni dell'odio
1968	Hell in Normandy	Capt. Jack Murphy	Alternative title: Testa di sbarco per otto implacabili
1969	Battle of the Last Panzer	Lofty	Alternative title: La Battaglia dell'ultimo panzer
1969	Un posto all'inferno	Major Mac Graves	Alternative title: Raiders of the Bloody Beach
1969	Hell Commandos	Major Carter	Alternative title: Comando al infierno
1969	The Devil's Man	Mike	Alternative title: Devilman Story
1969	I diavoli della guerra	Capt. George Vincent	
1971	Reverend's Colt	Reverend Miller	Alternative title: Reverendo Colt
1973	The Silkworm	Robert	Alternative title: The Silk Worm
1975	The Pacific Connection	The Old Man	
1976	Won Ton Ton, the Dog Who Saved Hollywood	Star at screening	
1978	Where's Willie?	Tony Flore	Alternative titles: Computer Kid; Computer Wizard
1979	The Hughes Mystery		
1989	Crossbow: The Movie	Gerrish	Direct-to-video release

Television
Year	Title	Role	Notes
1951–1958	The Adventures of Wild Bill Hickok	U.S. Marshal James Butler "Wild Bill" Hickok	112 episodes
1955–1956	The Ford Television Theatre	Various roles	2 episodes
1955–1957	Climax!		2 episodes
1957	Wagon Train	Riley Gratton	Episode: "The Riley Gratton Story"
1958	General Electric Theater	Adam Tenney	Episode: "Bold Loser"
1959	Schlitz Playhouse of Stars		Episode: "You Can't Win 'Em All"
1959	The Ann Sothern Show		Episode: "Katy and the Cowboy"
1959	The Red Skelton Show	Prospector	Episode: "San Fernando's Treasure Hunt"
1960	Death Valley Days	Luke Short	Episode: "Extra Guns"
1961	Dick Powell's Zane Grey Theatre	Jericho	Episode: "Jericho"
1979	Fantasy Island	Brick Howard	Episode: "Yesterday's Love/Fountain of Youth"
1979	The Rebels	Lieutenant Mayo	Television film
1987–1988	Crossbow	Gerrish	3 episodes
1988	Red River	Bill Meeker, rancher	Television film, (final film role)

== Awards ==
Year	Award	Category
1954	Golden Globe Award	Special Award (Best Western Star)
1986	Golden Boot Awards	Golden Boot
