= Wayne Mallory =

American film and television actor (1924–2020)

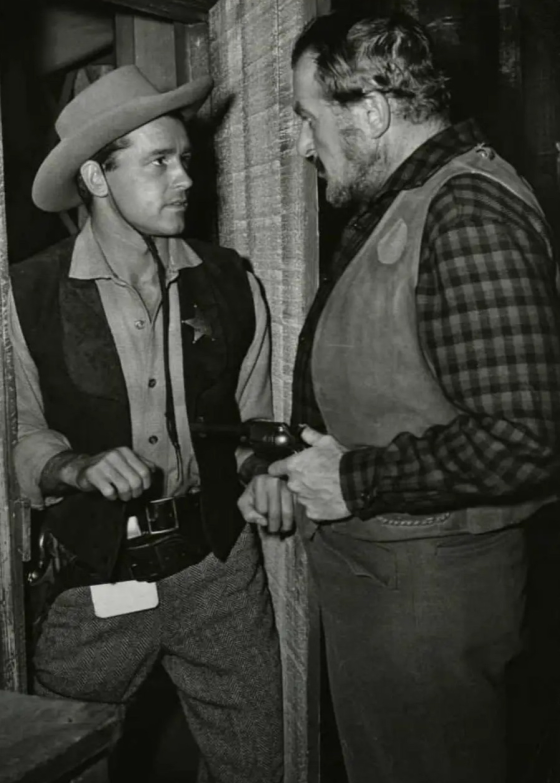
- Mallory (left) with Ralph Sanford in Death Valley Days, 1955
- Born: Wayne Wiley Moseley; October 13, 1924; Bakersfield, California, U.S.
- Died: October 11, 2020 (aged 95); Newbury Park, California, U.S.
- Occupations: Film and television actor
- Relatives: Guy Madison (brother); Gail Russell (sister-in-law)

Wayne Wiley Moseley (October 13, 1924 – October 11, 2020) was an American film and television actor. He was known for playing the recurring role of Deputy Louie in the third season of the American western television series The Life and Legend of Wyatt Earp.

== Life and career ==
Mallory was born in Bakersfield, California, the son of Benjamin Moseley and Mary Jane. He was the brother of Guy Madison, an actor. He began his screen career in 1951, with an uncredited role in the short film Deal Me In. In the same year, he appeared in the film When Worlds Collide, and made his television debut in the syndicated western television series The Adventures of Wild Bill Hickok.

Later in his career, Mallory guest-starred in television programs including Sergeant Preston of the Yukon, Bat Masterson, Tombstone Territory, Sea Hunt and Death Valley Days, and played the recurring role of Deputy Louie in the third season of the ABC western television series The Life and Legend of Wyatt Earp. He also appeared in films such as Reprisal! (as Tom Shipley), The Storm Rider, Kid Monk Baroni, Here Come the Marines and What Price Glory.

Mallory retired from acting in 1963, last appearing in the CBS anthology television series The Twilight Zone.

== Death ==
Mallory died on October 11, 2020, in Newbury Park, California, at the age of 95.
