= List of Western films 1955–1959 =

List of Western films released between 1955 and 1959

A list of Western films released from 1955 to 1959.

Title	Director	Cast	Country	Subgenre/Notes
1955
The Americano	William Castle	Glenn Ford, Frank Lovejoy, Cesar Romero, Ursula Thiess	United States	Traditional Western
Apache Ambush	Fred F. Sears	Bill Williams, Richard Jaeckel, Alex Montoya, Movita Castaneda, Tex Ritter, Ray Teal, James Griffith, Clayton Moore	United States	B Western
Apache Woman	Roger Corman	Lloyd Bridges, Joan Taylor	United States	B Western
At Gunpoint	Alfred L. Werker	Fred MacMurray, Dorothy Malone, Walter Brennan, Skip Homeier, John Qualen, Whit Bissell, Jack Lambert	United States	Traditional Western
Bad Day at Black Rock	John Sturges	Spencer Tracy, Robert Ryan, Anne Francis, Dean Jagger, Walter Brennan, John Ericson, Ernest Borgnine, Lee Marvin	United States	Film noir Western
Canyon Crossroads	Alfred L. Werker	Richard Basehart, Phyllis Kirk	United States	B Western
Chief Crazy Horse	George Sherman	Victor Mature, Suzan Ball, John Lund, Ray Danton, Keith Larsen, Paul Guilfoyle, David Janssen, Robert Warwick, James Millican, Morris Ankrum, Donald Randolph, James Westerfield, Dennis Weaver	United States	
Count Three and Pray	George Sherman	Van Heflin, Joanne Woodward, Philip Carey, Raymond Burr, Allison Hayes, Myron Healey, Nancy Kulp, James Griffith, Richard Webb, Kathryn Givney	United States	Traditional Western
The Coyote	Joaquín Luis Romero Marchent	Abel Salazar, Gloria Marín	Spain	
Davy Crockett: King of the Wild Frontier	Norman Foster	Fess Parker, Buddy Ebsen	United States	Traditional Western
Duel on the Mississippi	William Castle	Lex Barker, Patricia Medina	United States	Traditional Western
The Far Country	Anthony Mann	James Stewart, Ruth Roman, Corinne Calvet, Walter Brennan, John McIntire, Jay C. Flippen, Harry Morgan, Steve Brodie, Connie Gilchrist, Robert J. Wilke, Chubby Johnson, Royal Dano, Eugene Borden, Jack Elam, Kathleen Freeman	United States	Alaskan Western
The Far Horizons	Rudolph Maté	Fred MacMurray, Charlton Heston, Donna Reed, Barbara Hale	United States	Traditional Western
Five Guns West	Roger Corman	John Lund, Dorothy Malone, Touch Connors, R. Wright Campbell, Jonathan Haze, Paul Birch, James Stone, Jack Ingram, Larry Thor	United States	Traditional Western
Fort Yuma	Lesley Selander	Peter Graves, Joan Vohs, John Hudson, Joan Taylor, William 'Bill' Phillips, James O'Hara, Abel Fernandez, Addison Richards	United States	B Western
Foxfire	Joseph Pevney	Jane Russell, Jeff Chandler, Dan Duryea, Mara Corday, Barton MacLane, Frieda Inescort, Celia Lovsky, Eddy Waller, Robert F. Simon, Charlotte Wynters, Robert Bice, Arthur Space	United States	Traditional Western
Fury in Paradise	George Bruce	Peter M. Thompson, Rebeca Iturbide	Mexico, United States	B Western
The Gun That Won the West	William Castle	Dennis Morgan, Richard Denning, Madisyn Shipman, Paula Raymond	United States	B Western
The Indian Fighter	André De Toth	Kirk Douglas, Elsa Martinelli, Walter Matthau, Diana Douglas, Walter Abel, Lon Chaney, Eduard Franz, Alan Hale, Elisha Cook, Ray Teal, Frank Cady, Michael Winkelman, William Phipps, Harry Landers, Hank Worden	United States	Traditional Western
Kentucky Rifle	Carl K. Hittleman	Chill Wills, Lance Fuller, Cathy Downs, Sterling Holloway, Henry Hull, Jeanne Cagney, Jess Barker	United States	B Western
The Kentuckian	Burt Lancaster	Burt Lancaster, Dianne Foster, Diana Lynn, John McIntire, Una Merkel, John Carradine, John Litel, Rhys Williams, Edward Norris, Walter Matthau, Donald MacDonald, Lisa Ferraday	United States	Traditional Western
Kiss of Fire'	Joseph M. Newman	Jack Palance, Barbara Rush	United States	Traditional Western
The Last Command	Frank Lloyd	Sterling Hayden, Anna Maria Alberghetti, Richard Carlson, Arthur Hunnicutt, Ernest Borgnine, J. Carrol Naish	United States	Traditional Western
The Last Frontier	Anthony Mann	Victor Mature, Guy Madison, Robert Preston, James Whitmore, Anne Bancroft, Russell Collins, Peter Whitney, Pat Hogan	United States	Traditional Western
Last of the Desperados	Sam Newfield	James Craig, Jim Davis, Barton MacLane, Margia Dean, Donna Martell, Myrna Dell, Bob Steele, Stanley Clements, Dick Elliott	United States	Traditional Western
A Lawless Street	Joseph H. Lewis	Randolph Scott, Angela Lansbury, Warner Anderson, Jean Parker, Wallace Ford, John Emery, James Bell, Ruth Donnelly, Harry Antrim, Michael Pate, Don Megowan	United States	Traditional Western
The Left Hand of God	Edward Dmytryk	Humphrey Bogart, Gene Tierney, Lee J. Cobb	United States	Traditional Western
The Lonesome Trail	Richard Bartlett	Wayne Morris, John Agar	United States	B Western
A Man Alone	Ray Milland	Ray Milland, Mary Murphy	United States	Traditional Western
The Man from Bitter Ridge	Jack Arnold	Lex Barker, Mara Corday, Stephen McNally, John Dehner, Trevor Bardette, Ray Teal, Warren Stevens, Myron Healey, John Harmon	United States	Traditional Western
The Man from Laramie	Anthony Mann	James Stewart, Arthur Kennedy, Donald Crisp, Cathy O'Donnell, Alex Nicol, Aline MacMahon, Wallace Ford, Jack Elam, John War Eagle, James Millican, Gregg Barton, Boyd Stockman, Frank DeKova	United States	Traditional Western
Man with the Gun	Richard Wilson	Robert Mitchum, Jan Sterling, Karen Sharpe, Henry Hull, Emile Meyer, John Lupton, Barbara Lawrence, Ted de Corsia, Leo Gordon, James Westerfield, Robert Osterloh, Angie Dickinson	United States	Traditional Western
Man Without a Star	King Vidor	Kirk Douglas, Jeanne Crain, Claire Trevor, William Campbell, Richard Boone, Jay C. Flippen, Myrna Hansen, Mara Corday, Eddy Waller, Sheb Wooley, George Wallace, Frank Chase, Paul Birch, Roy Barcroft, William Challee, Malcolm Atterbury, Jack Elam	United States	Traditional Western
Many Rivers to Cross	Roy Rowland	Robert Taylor, Eleanor Parker, Victor McLaglen, Jeff Richards, Russ Tamblyn, James Arness, Alan Hale Jr., John Hudson, Rhys Williams, Josephine Hutchinson, Sig Ruman, Rosemary DeCamp, Russell Johnson, Ralph Moody, Abel Fernandez	United States	Traditional Western
The Marauders	Gerald Mayer	Dan Duryea, Jeff Richards, Keenan Wynn, John Hudson, Harry Shannon, James Anderson, Richard Lupino, Peter Mamakos, Mort Mills	United States	Traditional Western
The Naked Dawn	Edgar G. Ulmer	Arthur Kennedy, Betta St. John, Eugene Iglesias, Charlita, Roy Engel, Tony Martinez, Francis McDonald	United States	B Western
Oklahoma!	Fred Zinnemann	Gordon MacRae, Shirley Jones, Gene Nelson, Gloria Grahame, Charlotte Greenwood, Rod Steiger, Eddie Albert, James Whitmore, Barbara Lawrence, Jay C. Flippen, Roy Barcroft	United States	Musical Western
Outlaw Treasure	Oliver Drake	Johnny Carpenter, Adele Jergens	United States	B Western
Rage at Dawn	Tim Whelan	Randolph Scott, Forrest Tucker, Mala Powers, J. Carrol Naish, Edgar Buchanan, Myron Healey, Howard Petrie, Ray Teal, William Forrest, Denver Pyle, Trevor Bardette, Kenneth Tobey	United States	Traditional Western
The Road to Denver	Joseph Kane	John Payne, Mona Freeman	United States	Traditional Western
Robbers' Roost	Sidney Salkow	George Montgomery, Richard Boone, Sylvia Findley, Bruce Bennett, Peter Graves, Tony Romano, Warren Stevens, William Hopper, Stanley Clements, Leo Gordon	United States	B Western
Run for Cover	Nicholas Ray	James Cagney, Viveca Lindfors, John Derek, Jean Hersholt, Grant Withers, Jack Lambert, Ernest Borgnine, Ray Teal, Irving Bacon, Trevor Bardette, John Miljan, Gus Schilling	United States	
Santa Fe Passage	William Witney	John Payne, Faith Domergue, Rod Cameron	United States	Traditional Western
Seminole Uprising	Earl Bellamy	George Montgomery, Karin Booth	United States	Traditional Western
Seven Angry Men	Charles Marquis Warren	Raymond Massey, Debra Paget, Jeffrey Hunter, Larry Pennell	United States	Traditional Western
Shotgun	Lesley Selander	Sterling Hayden, Yvonne De Carlo	United States	Traditional Western
Smoke Signal	Jerry Hopper	Dana Andrews, Piper Laurie	United States	Traditional Western
The Spoilers	Jesse Hibbs	Anne Baxter, Jeff Chandler, Rory Calhoun, Ray Danton, Barbara Britton, John McIntire, Wallace Ford, Forrest Lewis, Carl Benton Reid, Raymond Walburn, Ruth Donnelly, Dayton Lummis, Willis Bouchey, Roy Barcroft, *Byron Foulger, Robert Foulk, Arthur Space, Bob Steele, Eddie Parker, Lee Roberts	United States	B Western
Strange Lady in Town	Mervyn LeRoy	Greer Garson, Dana Andrews, Cameron Mitchell	United States	Traditional Western
Stranger on Horseback	Jacques Tourneur	Joel McCrea, Miroslava, Kevin McCarthy, John McIntire, John Carradine, Nancy Gates, Emile Meyer, Robert Cornthwaite, Jaclynne Greene, Walter Baldwin, Emmett Lynn, Roy Roberts, George Keymas	United States	Traditional Western
Tall Man Riding	Lesley Selander	Randolph Scott, Dorothy Malone, Peggie Castle, Bill Ching, John Baragrey, Robert Barrat, John Dehner, Paul Richards, Lane Chandler, Mickey Simpson, Russell Conway	United States	Traditional Western
The Tall Men	Raoul Walsh	Clark Gable, Jane Russell, Robert Ryan, Cameron Mitchell, Juan García, Harry Shannon, Emile Meyer, Steve Darrell	United States	Traditional Western
Ten Wanted Men	Bruce Humberstone	Randolph Scott, Jocelyn Brando, Richard Boone, Alfonso Bedoya, Donna Martell, Skip Homeier, Clem Bevans, Leo Gordon, Minor Watson, Lester Matthews, Tom Powers, Dennis Weaver, Lee Van Cleef, Kathleen Crowley, Boyd 'Red' Morgan, Denver Pyle	United States	Traditional Western
Tennessee's Partner	Allan Dwan	John Payne, Ronald Reagan	United States	B Western
Texas Lady	Tim Whelan	Claudette Colbert, Barry Sullivan	United States	Traditional Western
Timberjack	Joseph Kane	Sterling Hayden, Vera Ralston	United States	Traditional Western
The Treasure of Pancho Villa	George Sherman	Rory Calhoun, Shelley Winters, Gilbert Roland, Joseph Calleia, Fanny Schiller, Carlos Múzquiz, Tony Carbajal, Pasquel Pena, Rodd Redwing	United States	Mexican Revolution Western
The Twinkle in God's Eye	George Blair	Mickey Rooney, Coleen Gray, Hugh O'Brian	United States	comedy Western
Untamed	Henry King	Tyrone Power, Susan Hayward, Richard Egan	United States	Traditional Western
The Vanishing American	Joseph Kane	Scott Brady, Audrey Totter, Forrest Tucker, Gene Lockhart	United States	Traditional Western
The Violent Men	Rudolph Maté	Glenn Ford, Barbara Stanwyck, Edward G. Robinson, Dianne Foster, Brian Keith, May Wynn	United States	Traditional Western
Two-Gun Lady	Richard Bartlett	Peggie Castle, William Talman, Marie Windsor	United States	Traditional Western
White Feather	Robert D. Webb	Robert Wagner, John Lund, Debra Paget, Jeffrey Hunter, Eduard Franz, Noah Beery Jr., Virginia Leith, Emile Meyer, Hugh O'Brian, Milburn Stone, Iron Eyes Cody	United States	Traditional Western
Wichita	Jacques Tourneur	Joel McCrea, Vera Miles, Lloyd Bridges, Wallace Ford, Edgar Buchanan, Peter Graves, Keith Larsen, Carl Benton Reid, John Smith, Walter Coy, Robert J. Wilke, Walter Sande, Jack Elam, Mae Clarke, Sam Peckinpah	United States	Traditional Western
Wyoming Renegades	Fred F. Sears	Philip Carey, Gene Evans, Martha Hyer	United States	Traditional Western
Yellowneck	R. John Hugh	Lin McCarthy, Stephen Courtleigh	United States	B Florida Western
1956
7th Cavalry	Joseph H. Lewis	Randolph Scott, Barbara Hale, Jay C. Flippen, Frank Faylen, Jeanette Nolan, Leo Gordon, Denver Pyle, Harry Carey Jr., Michael Pate, Donald Curtis, Frank Wilcox, Pat Hogan, Russell Hicks, Peter Ortiz	United States	Cavalry Western
Backlash	John Sturges	Richard Widmark, Donna Reed, William Campbell, John McIntire, Barton MacLane, Harry Morgan, Robert J. Wilke, Jack Lambert, Roy Roberts, Edward Platt, Robert Foulk, Phil Chambers, Gregg Barton, Fred Graham, Frank Chase	United States	Psychological Western
Bandido	Richard Fleischer	Robert Mitchum, Ursula Thiess, Gilbert Roland, Zachary Scott, Rodolfo Acosta, José Torvay, Henry Brandon, Douglas Fowley	United States	Mexican Revolution Western
The Beast of Hollow Mountain	Edward Nassour, Ismael Rodríguez	Guy Madison, Patricia Medina, Carlos Rivas, Eduardo Noriega, Julio Villarreal, Mario Navarro, Pascual García Peña, Lupe Carriles	United States	Horror Western
Blackjack Ketchum, Desperado	Earl Bellamy	Howard Duff, Margaret Field, Victor Jory, Angela Stevens	United States	Traditional Western
The Black Whip	Charles Marquis Warren	Hugh Marlowe, Angie Dickinson, Coleen Gray, Adele Mara, Richard Gilden, Paul Richards, John Pickard, Charles H. Gray, Sheb Wooley, Strother Martin, Harry Landers	United States	Traditional Western
Blazing the Overland Trail	Spencer Gordon Bennet	Dennis Moore	United States	Serial Western
The Brass Legend	Gerd Oswald	Hugh O'Brian, Nancy Gates, Raymond Burr, Reba Tassell, Donald MacDonald, Eddie Firestone, Stacy Harris, Dennis Cross, Russell Simpson, Vicente Padula, Clegg Hoyt, Charles Delaney, Paul Sorensen	United States	Traditional Western
The Broken Star	Lesley Selander	Howard Duff, Lita Baron, Bill Williams, Douglas Fowley, Henry Calvin, Addison Richards, Joel Ashley, John Pickard, William 'Bill' Phillips, Joe Dominguez	United States	B Western
The Burning Hills	Stuart Heisler	Tab Hunter, Natalie Wood, Skip Homeier, Eduard Franz, Claude Akins, Earl Holliman	United States	Traditional Western
Canyon River	Harmon Jones	George Montgomery, Marcia Henderson, Peter Graves, Richard Eyer, Walter Sande, Robert J. Wilke, Alan Hale Jr., John Harmon, Jack Lambert, William Fawcett	United States	B Western
Comanche	George Sherman	Dana Andrews, Kent Smith, Nestor Paiva, Henry Brandon, Stacy Harris, John Litel, Lowell Gilmore, Mike Mazurki, Tony Carbajal, Linda Cristal, Reed Sherman, Iron Eyes Cody	United States	B Western
Dakota Incident	Lewis R. Foster	Linda Darnell, Dale Robertson, John Lund, Ward Bond, Regis Toomey, Skip Homeier, Irving Bacon, John Doucette, Whit Bissell, William Fawcett, Malcolm Atterbury	United States	B Western
Daniel Boone, Trail Blazer	Albert C. Gannaway, Ismael Rodríguez	Bruce Bennett, Lon Chaney Jr., Faron Young	United States	Traditional Western
Davy Crockett and the River Pirates	Norman Foster	Fess Parker, Buddy Ebsen, Jeff York	United States	Traditional Western
A Day of Fury	Harmon Jones	Dale Robertson, Mara Corday, Jock Mahoney, Carl Benton Reid, Jan Merlin, John Dehner, Dee Carroll, Sheila Bromley, James Bell, Dani Crayne, Howard Wendell, Phil Chambers, Helen Kleeb	United States	Traditional Western
The Desperados Are in Town	Kurt Neumann	Robert Arthur, Kathleen Nolan	United States	Traditional Western
The Fastest Gun Alive	Russell Rouse	Glenn Ford, Jeanne Crain, Broderick Crawford, Russ Tamblyn, Allyn Joslyn, Leif Erickson, John Dehner, Noah Beery Jr., J. M. Kerrigan, Rhys Williams, Virginia Gregg, Chubby Johnson, John Doucette, Glenn Strange, Kermit Maynard, Dub Taylor, John Dierkes, Addison Richards	United States	Traditional Western
The First Texan	Byron Haskin	Joel McCrea, Felicia Farr, Jeff Morrow, Wallace Ford, Rodolfo Hoyos Jr., Abraham Sofaer, James Griffith, William Hopper, Dayton Lummis, Roy Roberts, David Silva, Chubby Johnson, Nelson Leigh	United States	Traditional Western
The First Traveling Saleslady	Arthur Lubin	Ginger Rogers, Barry Nelson, Carol Channing, James Arness, Clint Eastwood	United States	Comedy Western
Flesh and the Spur	Edward L. Cahn	John Agar, Marla English	United States	B Western
Friendly Persuasion	William Wyler	Gary Cooper, Dorothy McGuire	United States	Traditional Western
Frontier Gambler	Sam Newfield	John Bromfield, Coleen Gray	United States	B Western
Frontier Woman	Ron Ormond	Cindy Carson, Lance Fuller	United States	B Western
Fury at Gunsight Pass	Fred F. Sears	David Brian, Neville Brand, Richard Long, Lisa Davis, Katherine Warren, Percy Helton, Morris Ankrum, Addison Richards, Wally Vernon, Paul E. Burns, Frank Fenton	United States	B Western
Ghost Town	Allen H. Miner	Kent Taylor, John Smith	United States	B Western
Giant	George Stevens	Elizabeth Taylor, Rock Hudson, James Dean, Jane Withers, Robert Nichols, Chill Wills, Mercedes McCambridge, Carroll Baker, Dennis Hopper, Fran Bennett, Earl Holliman, Elsa Cárdenas, Paul Fix, Judith Evelyn, Carolyn Craig, Rod Taylor, Sal Mineo, Alexander Scourby, Mickey Simpson	United States	Contemporary Western
Great Day in the Morning	Jacques Tourneur	Robert Stack, Virginia Mayo, Ruth Roman, Raymond Burr, Alex Nicol, Regis Toomey, Leo Gordon, Carleton Young, Peter Whitney, Dan White	United States	B Western
The Great Locomotive Chase	Francis D. Lyon	Fess Parker, Jeffrey Hunter, Jeff York, John Lupton, Eddie Firestone, Kenneth Tobey, Don Megowan, Claude Jarman Jr., Harry Carey Jr., George Robotham, Stan Jones, Slim Pickens, Morgan Woodward	United States	Traditional Western
Gun Brothers	Sidney Salkow	Buster Crabbe, Ann Robinson, Neville Brand, Michael Ansara, Walter Sande, Lita Milan, Slim Pickens	United States	B Western
Gun the Man Down	Andrew McLaglen	James Arness, Angie Dickinson, Emile Meyer, Robert J. Wilke, Harry Carey Jr., Don Megowan, Michael Emmet, Pedro Gonzalez Gonzalez	United States	Traditional Western
Gunslinger	Roger Corman	Beverly Garland, John Ireland, Allison Hayes, Martin Kingsley, Jonathan Haze, Margaret Campbell, Bruno VeSota, Chris Alcaide, Dick Miller, William Schallert, Kermit Maynard	United States	B Western
Hidden Guns	Albert C. Gannaway	Bruce Bennett, Richard Arlen, Angie Dickinson	United States	B Western
I Killed Wild Bill Hickok	Richard Talmadge	Johnny Carpenter, Tom Brown	United States	B Western
Johnny Concho	Don McGuire	Frank Sinatra, Keenan Wynn, William Conrad, Phyllis Kirk, Wallace Ford, Dorothy Adams, Christopher Dark, Howard Petrie, Harry Bartell, Dan Riss, Willis Bouchey, Robert Osterloh, Jean Byron, Leo Gordon, Claude Akins, John Qualen, Ben Wright, Strother Martin	United States	Traditional Western
Jubal	Delmer Daves	Glenn Ford, Ernest Borgnine, Rod Steiger, Valerie French, Felicia Farr, Basil Ruysdael, Noah Beery Jr., Charles Bronson, John Dierkes, Jack Elam	United States	Traditional Western
The King and Four Queens	Raoul Walsh	Clark Gable, Eleanor Parker, Jean Willes, Barbara Nichols, Sara Shane, Jo Van Fleet, Roy Roberts, Arthur Shields, Jay C. Flippen, Florenz Ames, Chuck Roberson	United States	Comedy Western
La justicia del Coyote	Joaquín Luis Romero Marchent	Abel Salazar, Gloria Marín	Spain	
The Last Hunt	Richard Brooks	Robert Taylor, Stewart Granger, Debra Paget, Lloyd Nolan, Russ Tamblyn, Constance Ford, Joe De Santis	United States	Traditional Western
The Last Wagon	Delmer Daves	Richard Widmark, Felicia Farr, Susan Kohner, Tommy Rettig, Stephanie Griffin, Ray Stricklyn, Nick Adams, Carl Benton Reid, Douglas Kennedy, George Mathews, James Drury, Ken Clark, Timothy Carey, Abel Fernandez, George Ross	United States	Traditional Western
The Lone Ranger	Stuart Heisler	Clayton Moore, Jay Silverheels, Lyle Bettger, Bonita Granville, Perry Lopez, Robert J. Wilke, John Pickard, Beverly Washburn, Michael Ansara, Frank DeKova, Charles Meredith, Mickey Simpson, Lane Chandler	United States	Western based on a radio and television hero
Love Me Tender	Robert D. Webb	Elvis Presley, Debra Paget, Richard Egan, Mildred Dunnock, William Campbell, James Drury, Neville Brand, Russ Conway, L.Q. Jones, Robert Middleton, Bruce Bennett, Ken Clark, Barry Coe	United States	Musical Western
Man from Del Rio	Harry Horner	Anthony Quinn, Katy Jurado, Peter Whitney, Douglas Fowley, John Larch, Whit Bissell, Douglas Spencer	United States	B Western
Massacre	Louis King	Dane Clark, James Craig	United States	B Western
Massacre at Sand Creek	Arthur Hiller	Everett Sloane, John Derek	United States	B Western
The Maverick Queen	Joseph Kane	Barbara Stanwyck, Barry Sullivan, Scott Brady, Mary Murphy, Wallace Ford, Howard Petrie, Jim Davis, Emile Meyer, Walter Sande, George Keymas, John Doucette, Taylor Holmes, Pierre Watkin	United States	Traditional Western
Mohawk	Kurt Neumann	Scott Brady, Rita Gam	United States	B Western set in the American Revolution
The Naked Hills	Josef Shaftel	David Wayne, Keenan Wynn	United States	B Western
Naked Gun	Eddie Dew	Willard Parker, Mara Corday	United States	B Western
The Oklahoma Woman	Roger Corman	Peggie Castle, Richard Denning	United States	B Western
Pardners	Norman Taurog	Dean Martin, Jerry Lewis, Agnes Moorehead, Lori Nelson, Jeff Morrow, John Baragrey, Jackie Loughery, Milton Frome, Lon Chaney Jr., Lee Van Cleef, Jack Elam, Bob Steele, Emory Parnell	United States	Comedy Western
The Peacemaker	Ted Post	James Mitchell, Rosemarie Bowe, Jan Merlin, Hugh Sanders, Jess Barker	United States	B Western
Perils of the Wilderness	Spencer Gordon Bennet	Dennis Moore, Evelyn Finley	United States	Serial Western
Pillars of the Sky	George Marshall	Jeff Chandler, Dorothy Malone, Ward Bond, Keith Andes, Lee Marvin, Sydney Chaplin, Willis Bouchey, Michael Ansara, Olive Carey, Floyd Simmons, Pat Hogan, Paul Smith, Martin Milner, Robert Ellis, Walter Coy, Alberto Morin, Richard Hale, Frank Kova, Terry Wilson	United States	Traditional Western
The Proud Ones	Robert D. Webb	Robert Ryan, Virginia Mayo, Jeffrey Hunter, Robert Middleton, Walter Brennan, Arthur O'Connell, Ken Clark, Rodolfo Acosta, George Mathews, Edward Platt, Whit Bissell, Edward Mundy, I. Stanford Jolley, William Fawcett, Richard Deacon, Jackie Coogan	United States	B Western
Quincannon, Frontier Scout	Lesley Selander	Tony Martin, Peggie Castle, John Bromfield, John Smith, Ron Randell, John Doucette, Morris Ankrum, Peter Mamakos, Edmund Hashim	United States	B Western
The Rainmaker	Joseph Anthony	Burt Lancaster, Katharine Hepburn	United States	Traditional Western
Raw Edge	John Sherwood	Rory Calhoun, Yvonne DeCarlo, Mara Corday, Rex Reason, Neville Brand, Emile Meyer, Herbert Rudley, Robert J. Wilke, John Gavin, Ed Fury, William Schallert	United States	Traditional Western
The Rawhide Years	Rudolph Maté	Tony Curtis, Colleen Miller, Arthur Kennedy	United States	Traditional Western
Rebel in Town	Alfred L. Werker	John Payne, Ruth Roman, J. Carrol Naish, Ben Cooper	United States	Traditional Western
Red Sundown	Jack Arnold	Rory Calhoun, Martha Hyer, Dean Jagger, Robert Middleton, Grant Williams, Lita Baron, James Millican, Trevor Bardette, Leo Gordon, David Kasday	United States	Traditional Western
Reprisal!	George Sherman	Guy Madison, Felicia Farr, Kathryn Grant	United States	Traditional Western
Running Target	Marvin R. Weinstein	Doris Dowling, Arthur Franz, Richard Reeves, Myron Healey, James Parnell	United States	Traditional Western
The Searchers	John Ford	John Wayne, Jeffrey Hunter, Vera Miles, Ward Bond, Natalie Wood, John Qualen, Olive Carey, Henry Brandon, Ken Curtis, Harry Carey Jr., Antonio Moreno, Hank Worden, Walter Coy, Dorothy Jordan, Pippa Scott, Lana Wood, Patrick Wayne	United States	Epic Western
Secret of Treasure Mountain	Seymour Friedman	Valerie French, Raymond Burr, William Prince, Lance Fuller, Susan Cummings, Pat Hogan, Reginald Sheffield, Rodolfo Hoyos Jr.	United States	B Western
Seven Men From Now	Budd Boetticher	Randolph Scott, Gail Russell, Lee Marvin, Walter Reed, John Larch, Don 'Red' Barry, Fred Graham, John Beradino, John Phillips, Chuck Roberson, Stuart Whitman, Pamela Duncan, Steve Mitchell, Cliff Lyons	United States	Traditional Western
Showdown at Abilene	Charles F. Haas	Jock Mahoney, Martha Hyer, Lyle Bettger	United States	Traditional Western
Stagecoach to Fury	William F. Claxton	Forrest Tucker, Mari Blanchard	United States	Traditional Western
Star in the Dust	Charles F. Haas	John Agar, Mamie Van Doren, Richard Boone, Coleen Gray, Leif Erickson, James Gleason, Randy Stuart, Terry Gilkyson, Paul Fix, Harry Morgan, Stuart Randall, Robert Osterloh, Stanley Andrews, Stafford Repp, Lewis Martin, Clint Eastwood	United States	Traditional Western
Stranger at My Door	William Witney	Macdonald Carey, Patricia Medina, Skip Homeier	United States	Traditional Western
Tension at Table Rock	Charles Marquis Warren	Richard Egan, Dorothy Malone, Cameron Mitchell, Billy Chapin, Royal Dano, Edward Andrews, John Dehner, DeForest Kelley, Joe De Santis, Angie Dickinson, Jeanne Bates	United States	Traditional Western
Tribute to a Bad Man	Robert Wise	James Cagney, Don Dubbins, Stephen McNally, Irene Papas, Vic Morrow, James Griffith, Onslow Stevens, James Bell, Jeanette Nolan, Lee Van Cleef	United States	Traditional Western
Walk the Proud Land	Jesse Hibbs	Audie Murphy, Anne Bancroft, Pat Crowley, Charles Drake, Tommy Rall, Robert Warwick, Jay Silverheels, Anthony Caruso, Victor Millan, Ainslie Pryor, Eugene Iglesias, Morris Ankrum, Addison Richards	United States	Traditional Western
Westward Ho, The Wagons!	William Beaudine	Fess Parker, Kathleen Crowley, Jeff York, David Stollery, Sebastian Cabot, George Reeves, Doreen Tracey, Morgan Woodward, Barbara Woodell, Iron Eyes Cody, John War Eagle, Anthony Numkena, Cubby O'Brien, Karen Pendleton, Tommy Cole, Leslie Bradley	United States	Traditional Western
The White Squaw	Ray Nazarro	David Brian, May Wynn, William Bishop	United States	Traditional Western
The Wild Dakotas	Sam Newfield	Bill Williams, Coleen Gray, Jim Davis	United States	Traditional Western
Yaqui Drums	Jean Yarbrough	Rod Cameron, J. Carrol Naish, Mary Castle	United States	Traditional Western
The Young Guns	Albert Band	Russ Tamblyn, Gloria Talbott, Perry Lopez	United States	Traditional Western
1957
Along the Mohawk Trail	Sidney Salkow, Sam Newfield	John Hart, Lon Chaney Jr.	United States	Two TV episodes of the 1957 TV series Hawkeye and the Last of the Mohicans
Apache Warrior	Elmo Williams	Keith Larson, Jim Davis	United States	Traditional Western
The Badge of Marshal Brennan	Albert C. Gannaway	Jim Davis, Arleen Whelan	United States	Traditional Western
Badlands of Montana	Daniel B. Ullman	Rex Reason, Margia Dean, Emile Meyer	United States	Traditional Western
Band of Angels	Raoul Walsh	Clark Gable, Yvonne De Carlo, Sidney Poitier, Efrem Zimbalist Jr.	United States	Traditional Western
The Big Land	Gordon Douglas	Alan Ladd, Virginia Mayo, Edmond O'Brien, Anthony Caruso, Julie Bishop, John Qualen, Don Castle, David Ladd, Jack Wrather Jr., George J. Lewis	United States	Traditional Western
Black Patch	Allen H. Miner	George Montgomery, Diane Brewster, Tom Pittman, Leo Gordon, House Peters Jr., Lynn Cartwright, Jorge Treviño, Peter Brocco, Ted Jacques, Strother Martin, Gilman Rankin, Ned Glass, Stanley Adams, Sebastian Cabot	United States	Traditional Western
The Buckskin Lady	Carl K. Hittleman	Patricia Medina, Richard Denning, Gerald Mohr, Henry Hull, Hank Worden, Richard Reeves, Dorothy Adams, Frank Sully, George Cisar, Byron Foulger, John Dierkes, Paul Wexler	United States	B Western
Campbell's Kingdom	Ralph Thomas	Dirk Bogarde	United Kingdom	Northern Western
Copper Sky	Charles Marquis Warren	Jeff Morrow, Coleen Gray	United States	Traditional Western
The Dalton Girls	Reginald LeBorg	Merry Anders, Penny Edwards, Lisa Davis, John Russell, Ed Hinton, Johnny Western, Malcolm Atterbury, Douglas Henderson	United States	B Western
Decision at Sundown	Budd Boetticher	Randolph Scott, John Carroll, Karen Steele, Valerie French, Noah Beery Jr., John Archer, Andrew Duggan, James Westerfield, John Litel, Ray Teal, Vaughn Taylor, Richard Deacon	United States	Traditional Western
Domino Kid	Ray Nazarro	Rory Calhoun, Kristine Miller, Andrew Duggan, Yvette Dugay, Peter Whitney, Eugene Iglesias, Robert Burton	United States	Traditional Western
Dragoon Wells Massacre	Harold D. Schuster	Barry Sullivan, Dennis O'Keefe, Mona Freeman, Katy Jurado, Sebastian Cabot, Casey Adams, Jack Elam, Trevor Bardette, Jon Shepodd, Hank Worden, Warren Douglas, John War Eagle	United States	Traditional Western
Drango	Hall Bartlett, Jules Bricken	Jeff Chandler, Julie London, Julie London, Donald Crisp, Ronald Howard, John Lupton, Walter Sande, Milburn Stone, Morris Ankrum, Parley Baer, Damian O'Flynn, Barney Phillips, Katherine Warren, Chubby Johnson, David Stollery, Edith Evanson, Amzie Strickland, Mimi Gibson, Paul Lukather, Bing Russell	United States	Traditional Western
Duel at Apache Wells	Joseph Kane	Anna Maria Alberghetti, Ben Cooper	United States	Traditional Western
Escape from Red Rock	Edward Bernds	Brian Donlevy, Eilene Janssen, Jay C. Flippen, William Edward Phipps, Myron Healey, Dan White, Natividad Vacío, Zon Murray, Rick Vallin, Ed Hinton, Frank Richards, Linda Dangcil, Hank Patterson, Frank Marlowe, Dick Crockett	United States	Traditional Western
Forty Guns	Samuel Fuller	Barbara Stanwyck, Barry Sullivan, Gene Barry, Robert Dix, Dean Jagger, John Ericson, Hank Worden, Chuck Roberson, Chuck Hayward, Eve Brent	United States	Traditional Western
Fury at Showdown	Gerd Oswald	John Derek, John Smith, Carolyn Craig, Nick Adams, Gage Clarke, Robert Griffin, Malcolm Atterbury, Rusty Lane, Sydney Smith, Frances Morris, Tyler MacDuff, Robert Adler, Ken Christy	United States	B Western
Gun Battle at Monterey	Sidney Franklin Jr., Carl K. Hittleman	Sterling Hayden, Pamela Duncan, Lee Van Cleef, Ted de Corsia, Mary Beth Hughes, Byron Foulger, Mauritz Hugo, I. Stanford Jolley	United States	Traditional Western
Gun Duel in Durango	Sidney Salkow	George Montgomery, Ann Robinson, Steve Brodie, Bobby Clark, Frank Ferguson, Don 'Red' Barry, Henry Rowland, Denver Pyle, Mary Treen, Boyd "Red" Morgan	United States	B Western
Gun for a Coward	Abner Biberman	Fred MacMurray, Jeffrey Hunter, Janice Rule, Chill Wills, Dean Stockwell, Josephine Hutchinson, Betty Lynn, Iron Eyes Cody, Robert Hoy, Marjorie Stapp, John Larch, Paul Birch, Bob Steele, Frances Morris	United States	B Western
Gun Glory	Roy Rowland	Stewart Granger, Rhonda Fleming, Chill Wills, Steve Rowland, James Gregory, Jacques Aubuchon, Arch Johnson	United States	B Western
Gunfight at the O.K. Corral	John Sturges	Burt Lancaster, Kirk Douglas, Rhonda Fleming, Jo Van Fleet, John Ireland, Lyle Bettger, Frank Faylen, Earl Holliman, Ted de Corsia, Dennis Hopper, Whit Bissell, George Mathews, John Hudson, DeForest Kelley, Martin Milner, Lee Van Cleef, Jack Elam, Brian G. Hutton, Kenneth Tobey	United States	Outlaw Western
Gunfire at Indian Gap	Joseph Kane	Vera Ralston, Anthony George	United States	B Western
The Guns of Fort Petticoat	George Marshall	Audie Murphy, Kathryn Grant, Hope Emerson, Jeff Donnell, Jeanette Nolan, Sean McClory, Ernestine Wade, Peggy Maley, Isobel Elsom, Patricia Tiernan, Kim Charney. Ray Teal, Nestor Paiva, James Griffith, John Dierkes	United States	Cavalry Western featuring women
Gunsight Ridge	Francis D. Lyon	Joel McCrea, Mark Stevens, Joan Weldon, Addison Richards, Carolyn Craig, I. Stanford Jolley, George Chandler, Slim Pickens, Herb Vigran, Kitty Kelly, Jody McCrea, Cynthia Chenault, L. Q. Jones, Morgan Woodward	United States	Traditional Western
The Halliday Brand	Joseph H. Lewis	Joseph Cotten, Viveca Lindfors, Betsy Blair, Ward Bond, Bill Williams, Jay C. Flippen, Christopher Dark, Jeanette Nolan, Peter Ortiz	United States	B Western
The Hard Man	George Sherman	Guy Madison, Valerie French, Lorne Greene, Barry Atwater, Robert Burton, Rudy Bond, Trevor Bardette, Renata Vanni	United States	B Western
Hell Canyon Outlaws	Paul Landres	Dale Robertson, Brian Keith, Rosanna Rory	United States	Traditional Western
Hell's Crossroads	Franklin Adreon	Stephen McNally, Peggie Castle, Robert Vaughn, Barton MacLane, Harry Shannon, Henry Brandon, Douglas Kennedy, Grant Withers, Myron Healey, Frank Wilcox, Jean Howell, Morris Ankrum, Eddie Baker	United States	B Western
The Hired Gun	Ray Nazarro	Rory Calhoun, Anne Francis, Chuck Connors, Vince Edwards, John Litel	United States	B Western
The Iron Sheriff	Sidney Salkow	Sterling Hayden. Constance Ford, John Dehner, Kent Taylor, King Donovan, Kathleen Nolan, Darryl Hickman	United States	B Western
Joe Dakota	Richard Bartlett	Jock Mahoney, Luana Patten, Charles McGraw, Barbara Lawrence, Claude Akins, Lee Van Cleef, Anthony Caruso, Paul Birch, George Dunn, Steve Darrell, Rita Lynn, Gregg Barton	United States	Traditional Western
Last of the Badmen	Paul Landres	George Montgomery, Keith Larson	United States	B Western
The Last Stagecoach West	Joseph Kane	Jim Davis, Mary Castle, Victor Jory, Lee Van Cleef, Grant Withers, Roy Barcroft, John Anderson, Glenn Strange, Francis McDonald, Willis Bouchey, Lewis Martin,* Tristram Coffin	United States	B Western
The Lawless Eighties	Joseph Kane	Buster Crabbe, John Smith	United States	Traditional Western
The Lonely Man	Henry Levin	Jack Palance, Anthony Perkins, Neville Brand, Elaine Aiken, Robert Middleton, Elisha Cook Jr., Claude Akins, Lee Van Cleef, Harry Shannon, James Bell, Adam Williams, Denver Pyle, John Doucette, Paul Newlan, Tennessee Ernie Ford	United States	Traditional Western
Man in the Shadow	Jack Arnold	Jeff Chandler, Orson Welles, Colleen Miller, Ben Alexander, Barbara Lawrence, John Larch, James Gleason, Royal Dano, Paul Fix, Leo Gordon, Martin Garralaga, Mario Siletti, William Schallert, Forrest Lewis, Harry Harvey Sr., Mort Mills	United States	Contemporary Western
Naked in the Sun	R. John Hugh	James Craig, Lita Milan	United States	Florida Western
Night Passage	James Neilson	James Stewart, Audie Murphy, Dan Duryea, Dianne Foster, Elaine Stewart, Brandon deWilde, Jay C. Flippen, Herbert Anderson, Robert J. Wilke, Hugh Beaumont, Jack Elam, Tommy Cook, Paul Fix, Olive Carey, James Flavin, Donald Curtis, Ellen Corby, Frank Chase, Harold Goodwin, Harold Hart, Chuck Roberson	United States	Traditional Western
The Oklahoman	Francis D. Lyon	Joel McCrea, Barbara Hale, Brad Dexter, Verna Felton, Douglas Dick, Michael Pate, Gloria Talbott, Esther Dale, Ray Teal, Scotty Beckett	United States	Traditional Western
Old Yeller	Robert J. Stevenson	Dorothy McGuire, Fess Parker	United States	Traditional Western
Oregon Passage	Paul Landres	John Ericson, Lola Albright	United States	Traditional Western
Outlaw Queen	Herbert S. Greene	Andrea King, Harry James	United States	B Western
Outlaw's Son	Lesley Selander	Dane Clark, Ben Cooper, Lori Nelson, Ellen Drew, John Pickard, Robert Knapp, Ahna Capri, Buddy Hart, Ken Christy	United States	B Western
The Parson and the Outlaw	Oliver Drake	Anthony Dexter, Sonny Tufts, Charles "Buddy" Rogers, Marie Windsor, Jean Parker, Robert Lowery, Bob Steele, Bob Duncan	United States	B Western
Pawnee	George Waggner	George Montgomery, Lola Albright	United States	traditional Western
The Persuader	Dick Ross	William Talman, Kristine Miller	United States	B Western
The Phantom Stagecoach	Ray Nazarro	William Bishop, Kathleen Crowley, Richard Webb	United States	B Western
Quantez	Harry Keller	Fred MacMurray, Dorothy Malone, James Barton, Sydney Chaplin, John Gavin, John Larch, Michael Ansara	United States	Traditional Western
The Quiet Gun	William F. Claxton	Forrest Tucker, Mara Corday, Jim Davis, Kathleen Crowley	United States	Traditional Western
Raiders of Old California	Albert C. Gannaway	Jim Davis, Arleen Whelan, Faron Young	United States	Traditional Western
Raintree Country	Edward Dmytryk	Montgomery Clift, Elizabeth Taylor, Eva Marie Saint	United States	Traditional Western
The Restless Breed	Allan Dwan	Scott Brady, Anne Bancroft, Jay C. Flippen, Jim Davis, Rhys Williams, Leo Gordon, Scott Marlowe, Eddy Waller, Harry Cheshire, Myron Healey, James Flavin, Clegg Hoyt	United States	B Western
Revolt at Fort Laramie	Lesley Selander	John Dehner, Gregg Palmer, Frances Helm, Don Gordon, Robert Keys, William 'Bill' Phillips, Robert Knapp, Eddie Little Sky, Kenne Duncan, Boyd Morgan, Harry Dean Stanton	United States	Civil War Western
Ride a Violent Mile	Charles Marquis Warren	John Agar, Penny Edwards	United States	Traditional Western
The Ride Back	Allen H. Miner	Anthony Quinn, William Conrad, Lita Milan, Victor Millan, Jorge Treviño, Ellen Hope Monroee, Joe Dominguez, Louis Towers	United States	B Western
Ride Out for Revenge	Bernard Girard	Rory Calhoun, Gloria Grahame, Lloyd Bridges, Joanne Gilbert, Vince Edwards, Richard Shannon, Frank DeKova, Michael Winkelman, Cyril Delevanti	United States	Traditional Western
Robbery Under Arms	Jack Lee	Peter Finch, Ronald Lewis	United Kingdom	Traditional Western
Run of the Arrow	Samuel Fuller	Rod Steiger, Sarita Montiel, Brian Keith, Ralph Meeker, Jay C. Flippen, Charles Bronson	United States	Outlaw/ revisionist Western
Shoot-Out at Medicine Bend	Richard L. Bare	Randolph Scott, James Craig, Angie Dickinson, Dani Crayne, James Garner, Gordon Jones, Trevor Bardette, Don Beddoe, Myron Healey, John Alderson, Harry Harvey, Robert Warwick, Richard Bellis, Ann Doran, Nancy Kulp	United States	Traditional Western
Sierra Stranger	Lee Sholem	Howard Duff, Gloria McGehee, Dick Foran, John Hoyt, Barton MacLane, George E. Stone, Ed Kemmer, Robert Foulk, Eve McVeagh, Henry Kulky, Byron Foulger	United States	Traditional Western
Slim Carter	Richard Bartlett	Jock Mahoney, Julie Adams, Tim Hovey	United States	comedy Western
Spoilers of the Forest	Joseph Kane	Rod Cameron, Vera Ralston, Ray Collins, Hillary Brooke	United States	Traditional Western
The Storm Rider	Edward Bernds	Scott Brady, Mala Powers, Bill Williams	United States	Traditional Western
The Tall Stranger	Thomas Carr	Joel McCrea, Virginia Mayo	United States	Traditional Western
The Tall T	Budd Boetticher	Randolph Scott, Richard Boone, Maureen O'Sullivan, Arthur Hunnicutt, Skip Homeier, Henry Silva, John Hubbard	United States	Traditional Western
3:10 to Yuma	Delmer Daves	Glenn Ford, Van Heflin, Felicia Farr, Leora Dana, Robert Emhardt, Ford Rainey, Henry Jones, Richard Jaeckel, George Mitchell, Robert Ellenstein	United States	Traditional Western
Three Violent People	Rudolph Maté	Charlton Heston, Anne Baxter, Gilbert Roland, Tom Tryon, Forrest Tucker, Bruce Bennett, Elaine Stritch, Barton MacLane, Peter Hansen, John Harmon, Ross Bagdasarian, Bobby Blake, Jameel Farah, Don Devlin, Raymond Greenleaf, Roy Engel, Argentina Brunetti	United States	Traditional Western
The Tin Star	Anthony Mann	Henry Fonda, Anthony Perkins, Betsy Palmer, Michel Ray, Neville Brand, John McIntire, Mary Webster, Peter Baldwin, Richard Shannon, Lee Van Cleef, Howard Petrie	United States	Traditional Western
Tomahawk Trail	Lesley Selander	Chuck Connors, Susan Cummings	United States	B Western
Trooper Hook	Charles Marquis Warren	Joel McCrea, Barbara Stanwyck, Earl Holliman, Edward Andrews, John Dehner, Susan Kohner, Royal Dano, Cathleen Nesbitt, Stanley Adams, Rodolfo Acosta, Sheb Wooley, Jeanne Bates, Cyril Delevanti, Paul Newlan, Charles Gray	United States	Traditional Western
The True Story of Jesse James	Nicholas Ray	Robert Wagner, Jeffrey Hunter, Hope Lange, Agnes Moorehead, Alan Hale Jr., John Carradine, Biff Elliot, Frank Gorshin, Carl Thayler, Adam Marshall, Anthony Ray, Louis Zito, Paul Wexler	United States	
Utah Blaine	Fred F. Sears	Rory Calhoun, Susan Cummings	United States	Traditional Western
Valerie	Gerd Oswald	Sterling Hayden, Anita Ekberg, Anthony Steel	United States	Traditional Western
War Drums	Reginald LeBorg	Lex Barker, Joan Taylor, Ben Johnson	United States	Traditional Western
1958
Ambush at Cimarron Pass	Jodie Copelan	Scott Brady, Margia Dean, Clint Eastwood, Irving Bacon, Frank Gerstle, Ray Boyle	United States	Traditional Western
Apache Territory	Ray Nazarro	Rory Calhoun, Barbara Bates, John Dehner	United States	Traditional Western
The Badlanders	Delmer Daves	Alan Ladd, Ernest Borgnine, Katy Jurado, Claire Kelly, Kent Smith, Nehemiah Persoff, Robert Emhardt, Anthony Caruso, Adam Williams, Ford Rainey, John Daheim	United States	Traditional Western
Badman's Country	Fred F. Sears	George Montgomery, Neville Brand, Buster Crabbe, Karin Booth, Gregory Walcott, Malcolm Atterbury, Russell Johnson, Richard Devon, Morris Ankrum, Dan Riss	United States	B Western
The Big Country	William Wyler	Gregory Peck, Carroll Baker, Charlton Heston, Jean Simmons, Burl Ives, Charles Bickford, Alfonso Bedoya, Chuck Connors, Chuck Hayward, Dorothy Adams, Chuck Roberson	United States	Epic Western
Bitter Heritage	Paul Wendkos	Franchot Tone, Elizabeth Montgomery	United States	B Western
Blood Arrow	Charles Marquis Warren	Scott Brady, Phyllis Coates	United States	B Western
Born Reckless	Howard W. Koch	Mamie Van Doren, Jeff Richards, Arthur Hunnicutt, Carol Ohmart, Tom Duggan, Nacho Galindo, Allegra Varron, Jim Canino, Jeanne Carmen	United States	Contemporary Western
The Bravados	Henry King	Gregory Peck, Joan Collins, Stephen Boyd, Albert Salmi, Henry Silva, Barry Coe, George Voskovec, Herbert Rudley, Lee Van Cleef, Andrew Duggan, Ken Scott, Gene Evans, Joe DeRita, Jason Wingreen, Ada Carrasco	United States	Traditional Western
Buchanan Rides Alone	Budd Boetticher	Randolph Scott, Craig Stevens, Barry Kelley, Tol Avery, Peter Whitney, Manuel Rojas, L. Q. Jones, Robert Anderson, Joe De Santis, William Leslie, Jennifer Holden, Nacho Galindo	United States	Traditional Western
Bullwhip	Harmon Jones	Guy Madison, Rhonda Fleming, James Griffith, Don Beddoe, Peter Adams, Dan Sheridan, Burt Nelson, Al Terr, Tim Graham, Hank Worden, Wayne Mallory, Barbara Woodell, Rush Williams, Don Shelton	United States	Traditional Western
Cattle Empire	Charles Marquis Warren	Joel McCrea, Gloria Talbott, Don Haggerty, Phyllis Coates, Bing Russell, Paul Brinegar, Charles H. Gray, Hal K. Dawson	United States	Traditional Western
Cole Younger, Gunfighter	R.G. Springsteen	Frank Lovejoy, James Best, Abby Dalton	United States	Traditional Western
Cowboy	Delmer Daves	Glenn Ford, Jack Lemmon, Anna Kashfi, Dick York, King Donovan, Brian Donlevy, Víctor Manuel Mendoza, Richard Jaeckel, Vaughn Taylor, Donald Randolph, James Westerfield, Eugene Iglesias, Frank DeKova	United States	Traditional Western
Day of the Bad Man	Harry Keller	Fred MacMurray, Joan Weldon, John Ericson, Robert Middleton, Marie Windsor, Edgar Buchanan, Eduard Franz, Skip Homeier, Peggy Converse, Robert Foulk, Ann Doran, Lee Van Cleef, Eddy Waller, Christopher Dark, Don Haggerty, Chris Alcaide	United States	Traditional Western
The Fiend Who Walked the West	Gordon Douglas	Robert Evans, Hugh O'Brian, Dolores Michaels, Linda Cristal, Stephen McNally, Edward Andrews, Ron Ely	United States	Traditional Western
Flaming Frontier	Sam Newfield	Bruce Bennett, Don Garrard	United States	B Western
Fort Bowie	Howard W. Koch	Ben Johnson, Jan Harrison, Kent Taylor, Maureen Hingert, Peter Mamakos, Larry Chance, J. Ian Douglas, Jerry Frank, Barbara Parry	United States	Traditional Western
Fort Dobbs	Gordon Douglas	Clint Walker, Virginia Mayo, Brian Keith, Richard Eyer, Russ Conway, Michael Dante	United States	B Western
Fort Massacre	Joseph M. Newman	Joel McCrea, Forrest Tucker, Susan Cabot, John Russell, George N. Neise, Anthony Caruso, Robert Osterloh, Denver Pyle, Francis McDonald, Rayford Barnes, Irving Bacon, Claire Carleton	United States	Traditional Western
From Hell to Texas	Henry Hathaway	Don Murray, Diane Varsi, Dennis Hopper, Chill Wills, R.G. Armstrong, Jay C. Flippen, Margo, Ken Scott, John Larch, Harry Carey Jr., Rodolfo Acosta, Malcolm Atterbury, Tom Greenway, Dayton Lummis, Jon Lormer, James Philbrook	United States	Traditional Western
Frontier Gun	Paul Landres	John Agar, Joyce Meadows	United States	Traditional Western
Gun Fever	Mark Stevens	Mark Stevens, John Lupton, Larry Storch, Maureen Hingert, Dean Fredericks, Clegg Hoyt, Russell Thorson, Robert J. Stevenson, Cyril Delevanti, Bill Erwin, Iron Eyes Cody, Eddie Little Sky	United States	B Western
Gunman's Walk	Phil Karlson	Van Heflin, Tab Hunter, Kathryn Grant, James Darren, Mickey Shaughnessy, Robert F. Simon, Edward Platt, Ray Teal, Paul Birch, Will Wright	United States	Traditional Western
Gunsmoke in Tucson	Thomas Carr	Mark Stevens, Forrest Tucker, Gale Robbins, Vaughn Taylor, John Ward, Kevin Hagen, Gail Kobe, George Keymas, Richard Reeves, William Henry, Zon Murray, Anthony Sydes	United States	Traditional Western
The Last of the Fast Guns	George Sherman	Jock Mahoney, Gilbert Roland, Linda Cristal, Lorne Greene, Carl Benton Reid, Edward Platt, Eduardo Noriega, Jorge Treviño, Rafael Alcayde, Lee Morgan, Milton Bernstein, José Chávez, Francisco Reiguera, Richard H. Cutting, Ralph Neff	United States	B Western
The Law and Jake Wade	John Sturges	Robert Taylor, Richard Widmark, Patricia Owens, Robert Middleton, Henry Silva, DeForest Kelley, Burt Douglas, Eddie Firestone	United States	Traditional Western
The Left Handed Gun	Arthur Penn	Paul Newman, Lita Milan, John Dehner, Hurd Hatfield, James Best, Colin Keith-Johnston, John Dierkes, Wally Brown, Ainslie Pryor, Martin Garralaga, Denver Pyle, Nestor Paiva, Robert Foulk, Anne Barton, Lane Chandler, Jess Franco, Terry Frost	United States	Outlaw/Revisionist Western
The Light in the Forest	Herschel Daugherty	Fess Parker, Wendell Corey, Joanne Dru, James MacArthur, Jessica Tandy	United States	Traditional Western
The Lone Ranger and the Lost City of Gold	Lesley Selander	Clayton Moore, Jay Silverheels, Douglas Kennedy, Charles Watts, Noreen Nash, Ralph Moody, Lisa Montell, John Miljan, Norman Fredric, Bill Henry, Lane Bradford	United States	Fantasy Western
A Lust to Kill	Oliver Drake	Jim Davis, Don Megowan, Allison Hayes	United States	B Western
Man from God's Country	Paul Landres	George Montgomery, Randy Stuart	United States	B Western
Man of the West	Anthony Mann	Gary Cooper, Julie London, Lee J. Cobb, Arthur O'Connell, Jack Lord, Royal Dano, John Dehner, Robert J. Wilke, J. Williams, Emory Parnell, Chief Tahachee	United States	Traditional Western
Man or Gun	Albert C. Gannaway	Macdonald Carey, Audrey Totter, James Craig, James Gleason, Warren Stevens, Harry Shannon, Ken Lynch	United States	B Western
The Missouri Traveler	Jerry Hopper	Brandon deWilde, Lee Marvin	United States	Traditional Western
Money, Women and Guns	Richard Bartlett	Jock Mahoney, Kim Hunter, Tim Hovey, Gene Evans, Tom Drake, Lon Chaney Jr., William Campbell, Jeffrey Stone, James Gleason, Judi Meredith, Phillip Terry, Richard Devon, Ian MacDonald, Don Megowan	United States	Traditional Western
Once Upon a Horse	Hal Kanter	Dan Rowan, Dick Martin, Martha Hyer, Leif Erickson, Nita Talbot, James Gleason, John McGiver, Paul Anderson	United States	Comedy Western
The Outcasts of Poker Flat	Paul Stanley	Lane Bradbury, Larry Hagman	United States	B Western
The Proud Rebel	Michael Curtiz	Alan Ladd, Olivia de Havilland, Dean Jagger, David Ladd, Cecil Kellaway, James Westerfield, Dean Stanton, Tom Pittman, Henry Hull, Eli Mintz, John Carradine, Percy Helton, Mary Wickes	United States	Traditional Western
Quantrill's Raiders	Edward Bernds	Steve Cochran, Diane Brewster	United States	B Western
The Rawhide Trail	Robert Gordon	Rex Reason, Nancy Gates	United States	Traditional Western
Return to Warbow	Ray Nazarro	Philip Carey, Catherine McLeod, Andrew Duggan, William Leslie, Robert J. Wilke, James Griffith, Jay Silverheels, Christopher Olsen	United States	B Western
Ride a Crooked Trail	Jesse Hibbs	Audie Murphy, Gia Scala, Walter Matthau, Henry Silva, Joanna Cook Moore, Mary Field, Leo Gordon, Mort Mills, Bill Walker, Ned Wever	United States	Traditional Western
Saddle the Wind	Robert Parrish	Robert Taylor, John Cassavetes, Julie London, Royal Dano, Charles McGraw, Donald Crisp, Richard Erdman, Douglas Spencer, Ray Teal	United States	Traditional Western
The Saga of Hemp Brown	Richard Carlson	Rory Calhoun, Beverly Garland, John Larch	United States	Traditional Western
Serenade of Texas	Richard Pottier	Luis Mariano, Bourvil, Germaine Damar	France	Musical
Seven Guns to Mesa	Edward Dein	Charles Quinlivan, Lola Albright	United States	B Western
The Sheepman	George Marshall	Glenn Ford, Shirley MacLaine, Leslie Nielsen, Mickey Shaughnessy, Edgar Buchanan, Willis Bouchey, Pernell Roberts, Slim Pickens, Pedro Gonzalez Gonzalez	United States	Comedy Western
The Sheriff of Fractured Jaw	Raoul Walsh	Kenneth More, Jayne Mansfield, Henry Hull, Bruce Cabot, Ronald Squire, William Campbell, Sid James, Reed De Rouen, Donald Stewart,* Clancy Cooper, Gordon Tanner, Robert Morley, David Horne, Eynon Evans	United Kingdom	Comedy Western filmed in Spain
Showdown at Boot Hill	Gene Fowler Jr.	Charles Bronson, Robert Hutton, John Carradine, Carole Mathews, Fintan Meyler, Paul Maxey, Thomas Browne Henry, George Douglas, Argentina Brunetti	United States	Traditional Western
Sierra Baron	James B. Clark	Brian Keith, Rick Jason, Rita Gam	United States	Traditional Western
The Sign of Zorro	Lewis R. Foster, Norman Foster	Guy Williams	United States	Traditional Western
Snowfire	Dorrell McGowan; Stuart E. McGowan	Don Megowan, Molly McGowan, Claire Kelly	United States	Traditional Western
Ten Days to Tulara	George Sherman	Sterling Hayden, Grace Raynor, Rodolfo Hoyos Jr.	United States	Traditional Western
Terror in a Texas Town	Joseph H. Lewis	Sterling Hayden, Sebastian Cabot, Carol Kelly, Eugene Mazzola, Nedrick Young, Victor Millan, Frank Ferguson, Marilee Earl	United States	Traditional Western
Tonka	Lewis R. Foster	Sal Mineo, Philip Carey, Jerome Courtland, Rafael Campos, H.M. Wynant, Joy Page, Britt Lomond, Herbert Rudley, John War Eagle, Slim Pickens, Eddie Little Sky	United States	Traditional Western
The Toughest Gun in Tombstone	Earl Bellamy	George Montgomery, Jim Davis, Beverly Tyler, Gerald Milton	United States	Traditional Western
Villa!!	James B. Clark	Brian Keith, Cesar Romero, Margia Dean, Rodolfo Hoyos Jr.	United States	Traditional Western
Wild Heritage	Charles F. Haas (as Charles Haas)	Will Rogers Jr., Maureen O'Sullivan, Rod McKuen	United States	Traditional Western
Wolf Dog	Sam Newfield	Jim Davis, Allison Hayes	United States; Canada	Traditional Western
1959
Alias Jesse James	Norman Z. McLeod	Bob Hope, Rhonda Fleming, Wendell Corey, Gloria Talbott, Jim Davis, Will Wright, Mary Young, Jack Lambert, Fred Kohler, Jr., Ethan Laidlaw, Glenn Strange	United States	Comedy Western
Cast a Long Shadow	Thomas Carr	Audie Murphy, Terry Moore, John Dehner, James Best, Rita Lynn, Denver Pyle, Ann Doran, Stacy Harris, Robert Foulk, Wright King	United States	Traditional Western
Curse of the Undead	Edward Dein	Eric Fleming, Michael Pate, Kathleen Crowley, John Hoyt, Bruce Gordon, Edward Binns, Jimmy Murphy, Helen Kleeb, Jay Adler, Eddie Parker, John Truax	United States	Horror Western
Day of the Outlaw	André De Toth	Robert Ryan, Burl Ives, Tina Louise, Alan Marshal, Venetia Stevenson, David Nelson, Nehemiah Persoff, Jack Lambert, Frank DeKova, Elisha Cook Jr., Dabbs Greer, Betsy Jones-Moreland, Helen Westcott, Paul Wexler	United States	Traditional Western
A Dog's Best Friend	Edward L. Cahn	Bill Williams, Marcia Henderson	United States	B Western
Escort West	Francis D. Lyon	Victor Mature, Elaine Stewart, Faith Domergue, Noah Beery Jr., Harry Carey Jr., Slim Pickens, Ken Curtis, X Brands, Roy Barcroft, William Ching, John Hubbard, Rex Ingram, Syd Saylor, Claire Du Brey, Chuck Hayward	United States	Traditional Western
Face of a Fugitive	Paul Wendkos	Fred MacMurray, Lin McCarthy, Dorothy Green, Alan Baxter, Myrna Fahey, James Coburn, Francis De Sales, Gina Gillespie, Ron Hayes, Paul E. Burns	United States	Traditional Western
Good Day for a Hanging	Nathan Juran	Fred MacMurray, Maggie Hayes, Robert Vaughn, Joan Blackman, James Drury, Wendell Holmes, Edmon Ryan, Stacy Harris, Kathryn Card, Emile Meyer, Bing Russell, Russell Thorson, Denver Pyle, Phil Chambers, Howard McNear	United States	Traditional Western
Gundown at Sandoval	Harry Keler	Lyle Bettger, Dan Duryea	United States	B Western
The Gunfight at Dodge City	Joseph M. Newman	Joel McCrea, Julie Adams, John McIntire, Nancy Gates, Richard Anderson, James Westerfield, Walter Coy, Don Haggerty, Wright King, Harry Lauter	United States	Traditional Western
Gunmen from Laredo	Wallace MacDonald	Robert Knapp, Jana Davi, Walter Coy, Paul Birch, Don C. Harvey, Clarence Straight, Ron Hayes Charles Horvath, Jean Moorhead, X Brands Harry Antrim, Bob Cason, Hank Patterson, Dan White, Bill Hale, Gil Perkins, Larry Thor, Martin Garralaga	United States	B Western
The Hanging Tree	Delmer Daves	Gary Cooper, Karl Malden, Maria Schell, George C. Scott, Karl Swenson, Ben Piazza, Virginia Gregg, John Dierkes, King Donovan	United States	Traditional Western
The Hangman	Michael Curtiz	Robert Taylor, Tina Louise, Fess Parker, Jack Lord	United States	Traditional Western
The Horse Soldiers	John Ford	John Wayne, William Holden, Constance Towers, Althea Gibson, Judson Pratt, Ken Curtis, Willis Bouchey, Bing Russell, O.Z. Whitehead, Hank Worden, Chuck Hayward, Denver Pyle, Strother Martin, Basil Ruysdael, Carleton Young, Walter Reed, Anna Lee, William Forrest, Ron Hagerthy, Russell Simpson, Hoot Gibson	United States	Traditional Western
The Jayhawkers!	Melvin Frank	Jeff Chandler, Fess Parker, Nicole Maurey, Henry Silva, Herbert Rudley, Jimmy Carter, Shari Lee Bernath, Leo Gordon, Barbara Knudson	United States	Traditional Western
King of the Wild Stallions	R.G. Springsteen	George Montgomery, Diane Brewster	United States	B Western
Last Train from Gun Hill	John Sturges	Kirk Douglas, Anthony Quinn, Carolyn Jones, Earl Holliman, Brian G. Hutton, Brad Dexter, Ziva Rodann, Val Avery, Bing Russell, Walter Sande, John Anderson	United States	Traditional Western
The Legend of Tom Dooley	Ted Post	Michael Landon, Jo Morrow, Jack Hogan, Richard Rust, Dee Pollock, Ken Lynch, Howard Wright, Ralph Moody, Cheerio Meredith, Jeff Morris, Gary Hunley	United States	Traditional Western
Lone Texan	Paul Landres	Willard Parker, Grant Williams, Audrey Dalton	United States	Traditional Western
The Miracle of the Hills	Paul Landres	Rex Reason, Nan Leslie, Betty Lou Gerson, Charles Arnt, Jay North, June Vincent	United States	B Western
Mustang!	Peter Stephens	Jack Buetel	United States	Traditional Western
No Name on the Bullet	Jack Arnold	Audie Murphy, Charles Drake, Joan Evans, Virginia Grey, Warren Stevens, R.G. Armstrong, Willis Bouchey, Simon Scott, Karl Swenson, Whit Bissell, John Alderson, Jerry Paris, Russ Bender	United States	Traditional Western
The Oregon Trail	Gene Fowler, Jr.	Fred MacMurray, William Bishop, Nina Shipman, Gloria Talbott, Henry Hull, John Carradine, John Dierkes, Elizabeth Patterson, James Bell, Ralph Sanford, Tex Terry, Ollie O'Toole, Arvo Ojala, Oscar Beregi Jr., Lumsden Hare, Addison Richards	United States	Traditional Western
Plunderers of Painted Flats	Albert C. Gannaway	Corinne Calvet, John Carroll	United States	B Western, last film ever released by Republic Pictures.
Ride Lonesome	Budd Boetticher	Randolph Scott, Karen Steele, Pernell Roberts, James Best, Lee Van Cleef, James Coburn, Bennie Dobbins, Roy Jenson, Boyd "Red" Morgan	United States	Traditional Western
Rio Bravo	Howard Hawks	John Wayne, Dean Martin, Ricky Nelson, Angie Dickinson, Walter Brennan, Ward Bond, John Russell, Pedro Gonzalez Gonzalez, Estelita Rodriguez, Claude Akins	United States	Traditional Western
La sceriffa/The Sheriff	Roberto Bianchi Montero	Tina Pica, Ugo Tognazzi, Livio Lorenzon	Italy	Spaghetti Western comedy, credited as the first Spaghetti Western
These Thousand Hills	Richard Fleischer	Don Murray, Richard Egan, Lee Remick, Patricia Owens, Stuart Whitman, Albert Dekker, Harold J. Stone, Royal Dano, Jean Willes, Robert Adler, Edmund Cobb, Steve Darrell, Douglas Fowley Fred Graham, Ted White, Ben Wright	United States	Traditional Western
They Came to Cordura	Robert Rossen	Gary Cooper, Rita Hayworth, Van Heflin, Tab Hunter, Richard Conte, Michael Callan, Dick York, Robert Keith, Carlos Romero, James Bannon, Edward Platt, Maurice Jara, Sam Buffington, Arthur Hanson	United States	Traditional Western
Thunder in the Sun	Russell Rouse	Susan Hayward, Jeff Chandler, Jacques Bergerac, Blanche Yurka, Carl Esmond, Fortunio Bonanova, Bertrand Castelli, Felix Locher, Veda Ann Borg	United States	Traditional Western
Warlock	Edward Dmytryk	Richard Widmark, Henry Fonda, Anthony Quinn, Dorothy Malone, Dolores Michaels, Wallace Ford, Tom Drake, Richard Arlen, DeForest Kelley, Regis Toomey, Vaughn Taylor, Don Beddoe, Whit Bissell, Bartlett Robinson, Frank Gorshin, June Blair	United States	Traditional Western
Westbound	Budd Boetticher	Randolph Scott, Virginia Mayo, Karen Steele, Michael Dante, Andrew Duggan, Michael Pate, Wally Brown	United States	Traditional Western
The Wild and the Innocent	Jack Sher	Audie Murphy, Joanne Dru, Gilbert Roland, Jim Backus, Sandra Dee, George Mitchell, Peter Breck, Strother Martin, Betty Harford, Lillian Adams, Jim Sheppard, Edson Stroll, Frank Wolff	United States	Traditional Western
The Wonderful Country	Robert Parrish	Robert Mitchum, Julie London, Gary Merrill, Albert Dekker, Charles McGraw, Satchel Paige, Anthony Caruso, Mike Kellin, Víctor Manuel Mendoza, Jay Novello, John Banner	United States	Traditional Western
Yellowstone Kelly	Gordon Douglas	Clint Walker, Edd Byrnes, John Russell, Ray Danton, Claude Akins, Rhodes Reason, Andra Martin, Gary Vinson, Warren Oates, Harry Shannon	United States	Traditional Western
The Young Land	Ted Tetzlaff	Patrick Wayne, Yvonne Craig, Dennis Hopper, Dan O'Herlihy, Roberto de la Madrid, Ken Curtis, Pedro Gonzalez Gonzalez, John Quijada, Carlos Romero	United States	Traditional Western
Zorro the Avenger	Charles Barton	Guy Williams, Charles Korvin, Henry Calvin, Gene Sheldon	United States	Traditional Western

== TV series of 1950s ==
see, List of TV Westerns
