= Thomas Browne Henry =

American character actor (1907–1980)

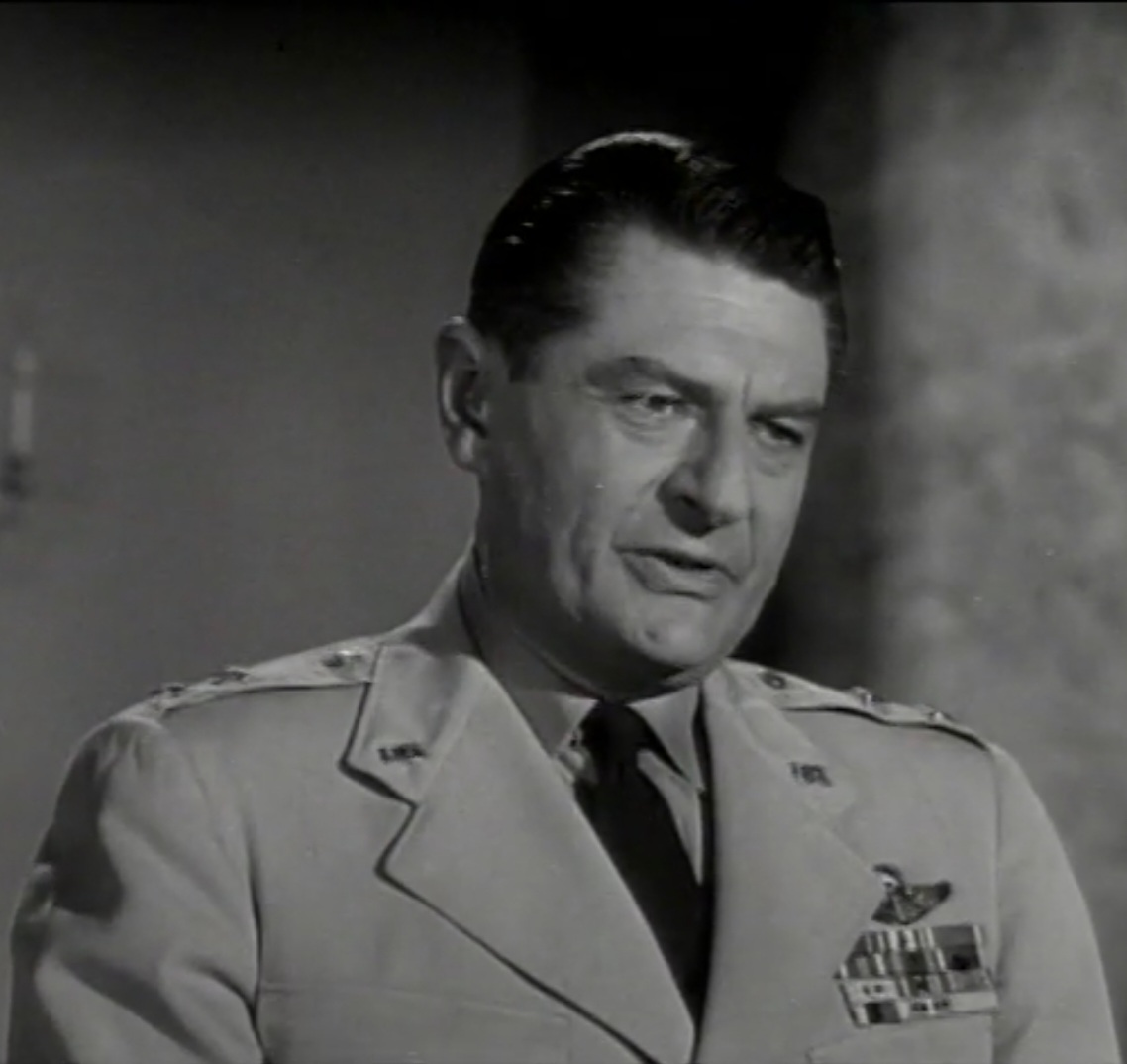
- Henry in the trailer for 20 Million Miles to Earth (1957)
- Born: November 7, 1907; Los Angeles, California, U.S.
- Died: June 30, 1980 (aged 72); La Mesa, California, U.S.
- Occupation: Actor
- Years active: 1948–1970
- Relatives: William Henry (brother)

Thomas Browne Henry (November 7, 1907 – June 30, 1980) was an American character actor known for many guest appearances on television and in films.

He was active with the Pasadena Community Playhouse and was the older brother of actor William Henry. He played Chief Yellow Bear in "Wagon Train" S1 E18 "The Gabe Carswell Story" which aired January 14, 1958.

== Selected filmography ==
- Hollow Triumph (1948) - Rocky Stansyck (uncredited)
- Behind Locked Doors (1948) - Dr. Clifford Porter
- Sealed Verdict (1948) - Briefing JAG colonel
- Joan of Arc (1948) - Captain Raoul de Gaucort
- He Walked by Night (1948) - Dunning (uncredited)
- Impact (1949) - Walter's Business Assistant (uncredited)
- Tulsa (1949) - Mr. Winslow (uncredited)
- Johnny Allegro (1949) - Frank (uncredited)
- House of Strangers (1949) - Judge (uncredited)
- Special Agent (1949) - Detective Benton (uncredited)
- Flaming Fury (1949) - Robert J. McManus (uncredited)
- Post Office Investigator (1949) - Lt. Contreras
- Bagdad (1949) - Elder (uncredited)
- Undertow (1949) - Police Capt. Kerrigan (uncredited)
- Samson and Delilah (1949) - Master of Exchequer (uncredited)
- Guilty of Treason (1950) - Hungarian Secret Police Col. Gabriel Peter [i.e. Peter Gabor]
- Captain Carey, U.S.A. (1950) - Art Dealer (uncredited)
- No Man of Her Own (1950) - Doctor at Hospital (uncredited)
- Father of the Bride (1950) - Stranger (uncredited)
- Shadow on the Wall (1950) - Judge (uncredited)
- The Asphalt Jungle (1950) - James X. Connery (uncredited)
- It's a Small World (1950) - Jackson
- The Next Voice You Hear... (1950) - Doctor (uncredited)
- The Skipper Surprised His Wife (1950) - Doctor (scenes deleted)
- My Blue Heaven (1950) - Tavern Proprietor (uncredited)
- Saddle Tramp (1950) - First Doctor (uncredited)
- Double Deal (1950) - Sheriff L.G. Morelli
- Mystery Submarine (1950) - Mr. Hagen (uncredited)
- Belle Le Grand (1951) - Prosecuting Attorney (uncredited)
- Mr. Belvedere Rings the Bell (1951) - Father Shea (uncredited)
- Little Egypt (1951) - Mustapha El Bay (uncredited)
- The Guy Who Came Back (1951) - Navy Doctor (uncredited)
- Saturday's Hero (1951) - Athletic Director Keppler (uncredited)
- Hoodlum Empire (1952) - Commissioner Mermant (uncredited)
- The Marrying Kind (1952) - Mr. Jenner (uncredited)
- Deadline – U.S.A. (1952) - Fenway (uncredited)
- The Atomic City (1952) - Projection Room Speaker (uncredited)
- Red Ball Express (1952) - Col. Carter (uncredited)
- Lovely to Look At (1952) - Prospective Investor (uncredited)
- Scarlet Angel (1952) - Jason Mortimer (uncredited)
- The Winning Team (1952) - Carlson Carlton - Lecturer (uncredited)
- Washington Story (1952) - Congressional Secretary (uncredited)
- O. Henry's Full House (1952) - Manager (segment "The Cop and the Anthem") (uncredited)
- The Prisoner of Zenda (1952) - Detchard (uncredited)
- Operation Secret (1952) - Brother Francis, a Monk (uncredited)
- Stars and Stripes Forever (1952) - David Blakely
- Ruby Gentry (1952) - Cotton Warehouse Owner (uncredited)
- The Lady Wants Mink (1953) - Mr. Swiss
- Julius Caesar (1953) - Volumnius
- Law and Order (1953) - Dixon (uncredited)
- The Robe (1953) - Marius - Physician (uncredited)
- The Veils of Bagdad (1953) - Mustapha the Wild
- Flight Nurse (1953) - Dr. Peterson (uncredited)
- Riot in Cell Block 11 (1954) - State Governor (uncredited)
- Sitting Bull (1954) - Indian Agent Webber
- The Violent Men (1954) - Mr. Vail (uncredited)
- Black Tuesday (1954) - Reporter at Electrocution (uncredited)
- A Man Alone (1955) - Maybanks
- Last of the Desperados (1955) - Pete Maxwell (uncredited)
- Toughest Man Alive (1955) - Dolphin
- D-Day the Sixth of June (1956) - Gen. Bolthouse (uncredited)
- The Leather Saint (1956) - Bishop Hardtke (uncredited)
- Earth vs. the Flying Saucers (1956) - Vice Adm. Enright
- A Strange Adventure (1956) - Criminal Attorney
- Fighting Trouble (1956) - Frankie Arbo
- The Power and the Prize (1956) - Paul F. Farragut
- Calling Homicide (1956) - Allen Gilmore
- The Desperados Are in Town (1956) - The Banker (uncredited)
- Highway Patrol (1956) - Malick, mobster boss
- Hellcats of the Navy (1957) - Board of Inquiry Chief (uncredited)
- 20 Million Miles to Earth (1957) - Maj. Gen. A.D. McIntosh
- Beginning of the End (1957) - Col. Tom Sturgeon
- Chicago Confidential (1957) - Judge (uncredited)
- The Brain from Planet Arous (1957) - John Fallon
- Domino Kid (1957) - The Doctor (uncredited)
- My Man Godfrey (1957) - Henderson
- Blood of Dracula (1957) - Mr. Paul Perkins
- Darby's Rangers (1958) - Major, Sutherland's CO (uncredited)
- Quantrill's Raiders (1958) - Griggs
- Showdown at Boot Hill (1958) - Con Maynor
- No Time for Sergeants (1958) - Senator (uncredited)
- Space Master X-7 (1958) - Prof. West
- The Case Against Brooklyn (1958) - Ralph Edmondson (uncredited)
- Wink of an Eye (1958) - Mr. Hix
- Screaming Mimi (1958) - Dr. Mapes (uncredited)
- The Thing That Couldn't Die (1958) - Galleon Capt. Fletcher (uncredited)
- How to Make a Monster (1958) - Martin Brace - director of 'Werewolf Meets Frankenstein'
- Johnny Rocco (1958) - Principal Farrington (uncredited)
- I Mobster (1959) - Udino's Attorney (uncredited)
- Say One for Me (1959) - Dr. Leventhal (uncredited)
- The Big Fisherman (1959) - Speaker (uncredited)
- The Real McCoys (1959) - Reverend Bascom (The Tax Man Cometh)
- Perry Mason (1959) - George Darby (The Case of the Dubious Bridegroom)
- Oklahoma Territory (1960) - Judge Parker (uncredited)
- I Passed for White (1960) - Dr. Merritt
- Wake Me When It's Over (1960) - 1st Investigating General (uncredited)
- Gunfight at Comanche Creek (1963) - Mike O'Bryant
- Airport (1970) - Prof. Charles Ruch - Passenger (uncredited) (final film role)

== Selected television ==
Year	Title	Role	Notes
1952–1953	Space Patrol	Holliday	
1960	Perry Mason	Hartley Basset	Season 4, Episode 1 "The Treacherous Toupee"
1960	Death Valley Days	Fraser	Episode "Pirates of San Francisco"
1960	Johnny Ringo	Marshal Adam Polk (as Thomas B. Henry)	Episode "The Raffertys"
1960	The Tom Ewell Show	Travers (as Thomas B. Henry)	Episode "The Spelling Bee"
1960	Wanted Dead or Alive	Dr. Parks (as Thomas B. Henry)	Season 2, Episode 30 "The Inheritance"
1960	Wanted Dead or Alive	Alfred Simmons (as Thomas B. Henry)	Season 3 Episode 2 "The Cure"
