= Toughest Man Alive =

1955 US film directed by Sidney Salkow

- Directed by: Sidney Salkow
- Written by: Steve Fisher
- Produced by: William F. Broidy
- Starring: Dane Clark; Lita Milan; Anthony Caruso
- Cinematography: John Martin
- Edited by: Ace Herman; Chandler House
- Music by: Edward J. Kay
- Production company: William F. Broidy Pictures
- Distributed by: Allied Artists Pictures
- Release date: November 6, 1955 (US)
- Running time: 74 minutes
- Country: United States
- Language: English

Toughest Man Alive is a 1955 American drama film directed by Sidney Salkow and starring Dane Clark, Lita Milan, and Anthony Caruso. Based on an original screenplay by Steve Fisher, the film was released on November 6, 1955.

== Cast ==
- Dane Clark as Lee Stevens aka Pete Gore
- Lita Milan as Lida Montoya
- Anthony Caruso as Pete Gore
- Ross Elliott as Cal York
- Myrna Dell as Nancy York
- Thomas B. Henry as Ed Dolphin
- Paul Levitt as Don
- John Eldredge as Widmer
- Dehl Berti as Salvador
- Richard Karlan as Morgan
- Syd Saylor as Proprietor
- Jonathan Seymour as Agency chief
- Don Mathers as Bank manager
- William Haade as Henchman hired by Lee
