= Bayou (film) =

1957 film

- Directed by: Harold Daniels
- Written by: Edward I. Fessler
- Produced by: M. A. Ripps
- Starring: Peter Graves; Lita Milan; Douglas Fowley; Timothy Carey
- Cinematography: Vincent Saizis
- Edited by: Maurice Wright
- Music by: Edward I. Fessler
- Production company: American National Films
- Distributed by: United Artists
- Release date: May 30, 1957
- Running time: 83 minutes
- Country: United States
- Language: English
- Box office: $10 million

Bayou is a 1957 American drama film directed by Harold Daniels and starring Peter Graves, Lita Milan and Douglas Fowley. The drama is set in the Louisiana bayou region. Produced by American National Films, it was also shot in Barataria Bay, Louisiana, and most of the characters are Cajun residents of a rural fishing village. Bayou features one of the few lead roles by noted character actor Timothy Carey.

== Plot ==
Martin Davis, a young Yankee architect, comes to New Orleans from the North to compete against a local man for the job of designing a new civic auditorium. On a visit to a carnival in the Cajun country of southern Louisiana, Martin meets Marie, a seventeen-year-old Cajun girl who works as a crabber in the bayou in order to support herself and her partly senile, alcoholic father Herbert. Marie has aroused the lust of the local storekeeper, Ulysses, a sadistic, illiterate bully who has attempted to rape her. After helping Marie to recover money stolen from her, Martin asks her to be his guide for the carnival activities. In order to impress the local building commissioner, Martin's contractor friend, Jim Tallant, enters him in a race using pirogues, primitive canoes hollowed out of tree trunks. Martin and Ulysses compete against each other and Ulysses, who greatly resents Martin's interest in Marie, wins when he deliberately cuts in front of Martin's canoe.

Despite Marie being underaged, Martin falls in love with her and arranges to stay longer in the area to pursue her. Ulysses threatens to harm Marie unless Herbert gets rid of Martin. Later, at a shivaree celebrating the marriage of an old man and a young girl, Marie performs a local folk dance. Ulysses then performs a strange, gyrating dance at the conclusion of which he challenges Martin to fight for Marie, but Martin walks away. Suddenly, the wind rises and a hurricane sweeps through the area, causing much devastation. While Martin and Marie seek shelter in an unoccupied house, Martin asks Marie to marry him and she accepts. Agitated by the hurricane, Herbert goes berserk and is killed by a falling tree. At Herbert's funeral, Ulysses makes a final effort to win Marie and taunts Martin into a brutal fight. However, Martin is victorious, and he and Marie leave the bayou to begin a new life together in the North.

== Cast ==
- Peter Graves as Martin Davis
- Lita Milan as Marie Hebert
- Douglas Fowley as Emil Hebert
- Jonathan Haze as Bos
- Ed Nelson as Etienne (credited as Edwin Nelson)
- Eugene Sonfield as Jean Tithe
- Evelyn Hendrickson as Doucette
- Milton Schneider as Cousine
- Michael Romano as Felician
- Timothy Carey as Ulysses (credited as Tim Carey)

== Release and legacy ==
The film, distributed by United Artists, did poorly upon initial release. In 1960, it was acquired by Cinema Distributors of America, who edited the film, added a few scenes, and changed the title to Poor White Trash (not to be confused with a 2000 Michael Addis-directed film of the same title). The change of title was intended to make the movie seem more lurid and sleazy. The film was re-released in 1961 and met with greater commercial success, playing drive-ins for years in double features with exploitation films such as I Hate Your Guts! and Shanty Tramp.

== See also ==
- List of American films of 1957
