= The Great Sioux Massacre =

1965 film by Sidney Salkow

- Original film poster
- Directed by: Sidney Salkow
- Screenplay by: Marvin A. Gluck (as Fred C. Dobbs)
- Story by: Sidney Salkow; Marvin A. Gluck (as Marvin Gluck)
- Produced by: Leon Fromkess
- Starring: Joseph Cotten; Darren McGavin; Philip Carey
- Cinematography: Irving Lippman
- Edited by: William Austin
- Music by: Emil Newman; Edward B. Powell
- Production company: Leon Fromkess-Sam Firks Productions
- Distributed by: Columbia Pictures
- Release date: June 1, 1965
- Running time: 102 minutes
- Country: United States
- Language: English

The Great Sioux Massacre is a 1965 American Western war film directed by Sidney Salkow in CinemaScope using extensive action sequences from Salkow's 1954 Sitting Bull. In a fictionalized form, it depicts Custer's descent from a defender of the Indians from federal interference to an incompetent warmonger, and the Indians as his victims, and covers events leading up to the Battle of the Little Bighorn and Custer's Last Stand.

It stars Joseph Cotten, Darren McGavin, and Philip Carey.

== Plot ==
The film begins at a board of inquiry over the Battle of the Little Big Horn, specifically examining the conduct of Major Marcus Reno. Captain Bill Benton (perhaps inspired by Frederick Benteen) is called to the stand, and rather than merely answer questions from the board states that he will tell his version of the "true story" that the audience sees through flashback.

Benton relates his first arrival in the Wild West in 1875, where his detachment is escorting the wife of the local Indian agent, Mr. Turner. The Indians attack the party and abduct Mrs. Turner from Benton's command. Benton's army scout Dakota advises against tracking the Indians until the next day due to their tactic of laying false trails that lead enemies into ambushes. Dakota and Benton come across a wounded Indian whom Dakota shoots, saying sarcastically that the native would now not have to starve on an Indian reservation.

Received by his commanding officer Lt. Col. George Armstrong Custer, Benton is gently told his first encounter with the enemy has been disastrous, but Custer confirms that he did the right thing by following Dakota's advice not to pursue the hostile party. Custer invites Benton to a dress ball to be held at the fort that evening and dismisses the distraught Mr. Turner by telling him that he will visit the hostile Indians who abducted his wife in the morning.

Benton's fiancée Caroline Reno is at the fort, but their relationship has grown cold due to Caroline's father Major Marcus Reno's grudge against Benton. At the dress ball, where Custer wears a major general's tunic with colonel's insignia, the drunken Major Reno comes in and demands everyone address and salute him as "Major General Reno" due to his former rank in the Confederate States Army. Custer replies with good humor, attempting to reconcile the former warriors of the North and South, but Reno is in a bad mood. He physically attacks Benton but only hits the floor, prompting Benton to inform Caroline that her "family tree has fallen".

The next day, Benton and Custer go to meet Crazy Horse and Sitting Bull to negotiate Mrs. Turner's release. The Indians propose that Custer release all his Indian prisoners in exchange for Mrs. Turner. Custer decides that he will hang the Indian leaders if Mrs. Turner is not released. The Indians reluctantly agree and Mrs. Turner is released.

Custer gains Benton's respect because of Custer's disgust at the incompetent Indian agents, whom he feels have been put in place by a corrupt federal administration that Custer and his wife Libby will confront in Washington. Before their departure, the captive Indians unsuccessfully attempt to escape and are slaughtered.

In Washington, DC, Colonel Custer destroys his military career by formally accusing many federal politicians of corruption, including Orvil Grant, the brother of President Ulysses S. Grant. When the President refuses to meet with Custer, the colonel begins to realize his military career may have come to a premature end.

At the same time back in the West, the Army's commander General Alfred Howe Terry visits the fort and summons Major Reno and Captain Benton to inform them that Custer is going to be court-martialed. Major Reno is deflated when the general offers Captain Benton command of the 7th Cavalry Regiment and a promotion to brevet colonel. Captain Benton refuses and considers resigning his commission out of loyalty to his commander. When Terry offers the same command to Reno, Caroline browbeats her father, which leads him also to reject the offer; he subsequently gives his blessing to Caroline and Benton's marriage and gives up his drinking.

In Washington, DC, Senator James G. Blaine visits the humbled Custer and tempts him with an offer to be his party's candidate for President of the United States. The senator informs Custer this can be accomplished by improving his reputation through a victory in a battle with the Indians. The senator assigns a newspaper journalist (likely based on Mark Kellogg) to Custer, who is sent back without court-martial to his regiment.

Benton notices that Custer's empathetic feelings for the Native Americans have vanished and he is pushing his regiment into a war where he can claim glory. Custer motivates his command by personally shooting deserters in the back, including his scout Dakota, who had defected to the Indian side. This prompts Benton to strike his commanding officer, resulting in his arrest. He is freed by Indians, who know of his attempts to help their people at the aborted escape attempt. His Indian friends are later ambushed by a cavalry patrol while Benton attempts to warn Colonel Custer of a massed Indian army made up of forces from several tribes. Custer fails to take sufficient heed of the warnings and divides his forces, weakening them. Thereafter, events unfold similarly to the historical Battle of the Little Big Horn where Custer and his immediate command are all killed.

== Cast ==
- Joseph Cotten as Major Marcus Reno
- Darren McGavin as Captain Bill Benton
- Philip Carey as Colonel George Armstrong Custer
- Julie Sommars as Caroline Reno
- Nancy Kovack as Libbie Custer
- John Matthews as Dakota
- Michael Pate as Sitting Bull
- Don Haggerty as Senator James Blaine
- Frank Ferguson as Gen. Alfred Howe Terry
- Stacy Harris as Mr. Turner
- Iron Eyes Cody as Crazy Horse
- House Peters Jr. as Reporter
- John Napier as Tom Custer
- William Tannen as Miner
- Blair Davies as Presiding officer
- Louise Serpa as Mrs. Turner

== Production ==
The Great Sioux Massacre was one of a series of films released by Columbia Pictures in the early to mid-1960s that were built around the reuse of large-scale action footage from other films, such as Nathan Juran's Siege of the Saxons (1963) and East of Sudan (1964) and John Gilling's The Brigand of Kandahar (1965). Filmed near Old Tucson, west of Tucson, Arizona, the action scenes in flat desert do not coincide with the hilly wooded Mexican landscapes of Salkow's Sitting Bull (1954).

The screenplay by Salkow and Marvin Gluck was credited as "Fred C. Dobbs", the name of Humphrey Bogart's character in The Treasure of the Sierra Madre (1948) and then the name of a nightclub on Sunset Strip. Italian American and faux Native American actor Iron Eyes Cody, who also played Crazy Horse in Salkow's Sitting Bull, had appeared in the 1936 Custer's Last Stand. Iron Eyes also acted as technical adviser on the film. Louise Serpa, who played Mrs. Turner, was a renowned rodeo photographer.

== See also ==
- List of American films of 1965
