= Sidney Salkow =

American film director, screenwriter, and television director (1911–2000)

- Born: June 16, 1911; New York City, New York, U.S.
- Died: October 18, 2000 (aged 89); Valley Village, California, U.S.
- Occupation: Film director

Sidney Salkow (June 16, 1911 – October 18, 2000) was an American film director (more than 50 motion pictures), screenwriter, and television director.

== Biography ==
Salkow was educated at the City College of New York, Columbia University, and Harvard Law School. After school, he returned to New York City and became an assistant director of theater and playwright. Later on, he established himself as a theatrical director. In 1932, he joined up with the film industry starting as a dialogue director. But soon, after achieving the ranks, he became a prolific writer/director of such films as Sitting Bull, Twice-Told Tales (1963), and The Last Man on Earth (1964), the last two both star Vincent Price.

During World War II, Salkow was commissioned into the United States Marine Corps rising to the rank of Major. He was wounded whilst filming a battle on an aircraft carrier.

Additionally, Salkow directed episodes of many popular TV series including Lassie, The Cisco Kid, and The Addams Family.

At the age of 59, Salkow retired from directing, and taught film courses at California State University-Northridge, where he became a professor emeritus and headed the film side of the Radio, Television and Film Department. He died October 18, 2000, in Valley Village, California, from natural causes at the age of 89.

== Filmography ==
- Four Days' Wonder (1936)
- Girl Overboard (1937)
- That's My Story (1937)
- Behind the Mike (1937)
- The Night Hawk (1938)
- Storm Over Bengal (1938)
- Fighting Thoroughbreds (1939)
- She Married a Cop (1939)
- Flight at Midnight (1939)
- Street of Missing Men (1939)
- Woman Doctor (1939)
- The Zero Hour (1939)
- Cafe Hostess (1940)
- Girl from God's Country (1940)
- The Lone Wolf Keeps a Date (1940)
- The Lone Wolf Meets a Lady (1940)
- The Lone Wolf Strikes (1940)
- The Lone Wolf Takes a Chance (1941)
- Tillie the Toiler (1941)
- Time Out for Rhythm (1941)
- The Adventures of Martin Eden (1942)
- Flight Lieutenant (1942)
- City Without Men (1943)
- The Boy from Stalingrad (1943)
- Faithful in My Fashion (1946)
- Bulldog Drummond at Bay (1947)
- Millie's Daughter (1947)
- Sword of the Avenger (1948)
- Shadow of the Eagle (1950)
- Fugitive Lady (1951)
- The Golden Hawk (1952)
- Scarlet Angel (1952)
- The Pathfinder (1952)
- Prince of Pirates (1953)
- Raiders of the Seven Seas (1953)
- Jack McCall, Desperado (1953)
- Sitting Bull (1954)
- Las Vegas Shakedown (1955)
- Robbers' Roost (1955)
- Toughest Man Alive (1955)
- Gun Brothers (1956)
- Chicago Confidential (1957)
- Gun Duel in Durango (1957)
- The Iron Sheriff (1957)
- The Big Night (1960)
- Twice-Told Tales (1963)
- Blood on the Arrow (1964)
- The Quick Gun (1964)
- The Last Man on Earth (1964)
- The Great Sioux Massacre (1965)
- The Murder Game (1965)
