= Naked in the Sun =

1957 film

- Theatrical release poster
- Directed by: R. John Hugh
- Screenplay by: John Cresswell
- Based on: The Warrior by Frank G. Slaughter
- Produced by: R. John Hugh
- Starring: James Craig; Lita Milan; Barton MacLane; Dennis Cross; Robert Wark; Jim Boles
- Cinematography: Charles T. O'Rork
- Edited by: William A. Slade
- Music by: Laurence Rosenthal
- Production company: Empire Studios
- Distributed by: Allied Artists Pictures
- Release date: September 20, 1957
- Running time: 78 minutes
- Country: United States
- Language: English

Naked in the Sun is a 1957 American Western film directed by R. John Hugh and written by John Cresswell. It is based on the 1956 novel The Warrior by Frank G. Slaughter. The film stars James Craig, Lita Milan, Barton MacLane, Dennis Cross, Robert Wark and Jim Boles. The film was released on September 20, 1957, by Allied Artists Pictures.

== Plot ==
As white settlers push into Seminole lands in the Florida Everglades, an unscrupulous and brutal slave trader named Wilson (Barton MacLane) raids Seminole territory and captures Chechotah (Lita Milan), the wife of Seminole leader Chief Osceola (James Craig). This kidnapping ignites outrage and leads Osceola to rally his people, along with alliances involving escaped enslaved Black people who had found refuge with the Seminoles. The incident escalates into open conflict, drawing in the U.S. Army and sparking a war between the Seminole tribe and federal forces.

Loosely based on historical events surrounding the real Osceola and the Second Seminole War, the story portrays Osceola's determined but challenging resistance to protect his people's homeland and way of life against encroaching settlers, slave catchers, and military pressure, highlighting themes of injustice, resistance, and frontier violence.

== Cast ==
- James Craig as Chief Osceola
- Lita Milan as Chechotah
- Barton MacLane as Wilson
- Dennis Cross as Coacoochee
- Robert Wark as Major Francis Dade
- Jim Boles as Arthur Gillis
- Doug Wilson as Captain Pace
- Peter Dearing as General Finch
- Tony Morris as Micanopah
- Mike Recco as Amanthla
- Tony Hunter as Captain in Dade's column
- Bill Armstrong as Lieutenant in Dade's column
