= Gun Brothers =

1956 film by Sidney Salkow

- Theatrical release poster
- Directed by: Sidney Salkow
- Written by: Gerald Drayson Adams; Richard Schayer
- Produced by: Edward Small
- Starring: Buster Crabbe; Ann Robinson; Neville Brand
- Cinematography: Kenneth Peach
- Edited by: Arthur Hilton
- Music by: Irving Gertz
- Production company: Grand Productions
- Distributed by: United Artists
- Release date: September 15, 1956
- Running time: 79 minutes
- Country: United States
- Language: English

Gun Brothers is a 1956 American Western film directed by Sidney Salkow and starring Buster Crabbe, Ann Robinson and Neville Brand. It was Crabbe's first feature film in six years.

== Plot ==
Wyoming, 1879: Chad Santee, a former Cavalry sergeant, is a passenger on a stagecoach bound for Cheyenne, along with saloon singer Rose Fargo and a gambler known as Blackjack Silk. The coach, carrying government gold, is stopped by a gang of outlaws.

Chad is on his way to see his brother Jubal's cattle ranch for the first time. What he doesn't know is that Jubal is among the masked outlaws who rob the coach. Chad intends to defend himself, but Blackjack, fearing a gunfight, knocks Chad cold. Rose takes umbrage, telling the gang about money Blackjack has hidden in his boot. Chad awakens to find Blackjack slapping the woman, so he flattens the gambler with a punch.

A posse arrives, led by Yellowstone Kelly, who used to be Chad's army commander. Yellowstone would like Chad to join him in Jackson Hole in the fur trading business. Chad says he's obligated to join his brother in the cattle business.

In town Chad starts to court Rose, but one of Jubal's men, Shawnee, has come to town to take Chad to his brother's ranch. Chad leaves, but assures Rose he will return. Along with Shawnee and Chad is Meeteense, an Indian maiden who "belongs" to Shawnee.

On the journey to the ranch, Chad treats Meeteetse kindly and she takes a liking to him. Arriving at Jubal's ranch, Chad discovers there are no cattle and the ranch is actually a hideout, with Jubal the gang's leader. Chad notices Meeteetse wearing a brooch taken from Rose in the stage hold-up, and realizes Jubal's gang robbed the coach. Shawnee wants Chad dead for knowing too much. Chad promises not to betray his brother and Jubal vouches for Chad's honesty. Chad tells Jubal he is going to Jackson Hole to get in the fur trading business, and Jubal send Meeteetse along with him to show him the way.

Chad and Meeteetse make a stop in town so Chad can give the brooch back to Rose, but Blackjack sees him with it and tells the sheriff. The sheriff confronts Chad, who takes flight and is shot trying to get away. Meeteetse, along with Rose, get him back to Jubal's ranch. Shawnee decides he wants Rose for himself, but Chad won't give her up. Jealous of Rose, Meeteetse goes to town and offers to take the sheriff to Jubal's ranch if he agrees to arrest Rose and let Chad go.

Chad and Rose plan to leave the ranch in secret, but Shawnee catches them and Chad wounds him. At that moment the sheriff and his men arrive and there is a gun battle between the sheriff's men and the outlaws. All of the outlaws except Shawnee and Junal are either killed or arrested. Chad, having seen the gun battle and thinking his brother is dead, rides off with Rose to a new life in Jackson Hole. Jubal, only wounded, escapes with Shawnee. They believe Chad sent Meeteetse to turn them in to the sheriff and they vow revenge.

Jubal and Shawnee bide their time, form another gang, then ride to Jackson Hole to kill Chad and steal his furs. Jubal confronts Chad and Chad convinces Jubal that he did not betray him. Shawnee takes Jubal's gun and says he's going to get the rest of the gang and come back to kill both brothers and take the furs. By the time Shawnee and the gang return, Chad and Jubal are prepared to defend themselves and are able to hold off the outlaws, though Jubal is killed saving Chad and Rose. In his honor, they name their baby girl Jubilee.

== Cast ==
- Buster Crabbe as Chad Santee
- Ann Robinson as Rose Fargo Santee
- Neville Brand as Jubal Santee
- Michael Ansara as Shawnee Jack
- Walter Sande as Yellowstone Kelly
- Lita Milan as Meeteetse
- Slim Pickens as Moose MacLain
- James Seay as Blackjack Silk
- Roy Barcroft as Sheriff Jorgen
- Dorothy Ford as Molly MacLain
- Rick Vallin as Gomez

== Production ==
The film was made by Grand Productions, which was owned by Edward Small.

== See also ==
- List of American films of 1956
