= The Ride Back =

1957 movie

- Theatrical release poster
- Directed by: Allen H. Miner
- Screenplay by: Antony Ellis
- Produced by: William Conrad
- Starring: Anthony Quinn; William Conrad; Lita Milan; Victor Millan; Jorge Treviño
- Cinematography: Joseph F. Biroc
- Edited by: Michael Luciano
- Music by: Frank De Vol
- Production companies: The Associates & Aldrich Company
- Distributed by: United Artists
- Release date: April 29, 1957
- Running time: 79 minutes
- Country: United States
- Language: English

The Ride Back is a 1957 American Western film directed by Allen H. Miner and written by Antony Ellis. The film stars Anthony Quinn, William Conrad, Lita Milan, Victor Millan and Jorge Trevino and was produced by Conrad. It was released on April 29, 1957, by United Artists. It was partially filmed in Wildwood Regional Park in Thousand Oaks, California.

It was produced by Robert Aldrich who called it "a good Western with psychological overtones".

== Plot ==
Lawman Chris Hamish is recruited to bring gunfighter Bob Kallen back for trial on unspecified charges. Hamish is a brooding haunted man who has been a failure at everything he has done and even his own wife scorns him. Kallen, on the other hand, is very confident, charismatic and decent at heart. This Western was rather novel because it was an intense character study of the two protagonists as they embark on their odyssey. Along the way, Hamish admits to his prisoner that he wants to bring him in not so much in the name of justice, but for his own self redemption. Stalked by blood-thirsty Apaches and picking up an orphaned child whose family the Apaches have murdered, the lawman and the outlaw are forced to rely upon each other for survival and in the end develop a bond of admiration and respect.

== Cast ==
- Anthony Quinn as Bob Kallen
- William Conrad as Sheriff Chris Hamish
- Lita Milan as Elena
- Victor Millan as Father Ignatius
- Jorge Treviño as Border Guard
- Ellen Hope Monroe as Little Girl
- Joe Dominguez as Luis
- Louis Towers as Boy

== Production ==
Aldrich had admired a documentary on tuna fishing directed by Miner.

The basis of the storyline was the June 28, 1952 episode of the radio version of Gunsmoke with the same title also written by Ellis.
