= A Man Alone (film) =

1955 film by Ray Milland

- Film poster
- Directed by: R. Milland
- Screenplay by: John Tucker Battle
- Story by: Mort Briskin
- Produced by: no credit (Herbert J. Yates presents)
- Starring: Ray Milland; Mary Murphy; Ward Bond
- Cinematography: Lionel Lindon, A.S.C.
- Edited by: Richard L. Van Enger, A.C.E.
- Music by: Victor Young
- Color process: Trucolor
- Production company: Republic Pictures
- Distributed by: Republic Pictures
- Release date: October 28, 1955
- Running time: 96 minutes
- Country: United States
- Language: English

A Man Alone is a 1955 American Western film directed by Ray Milland and starring Milland, Mary Murphy, Raymond Burr and Ward Bond. The story involves a man who stumbles onto the aftermath of a stagecoach robbery in the Arizona desert from which there were no survivors.

== Plot ==
On foot in the desert after the mercy killing of his horse, Wes Steele finds a stagecoach and a number of dead passengers. He takes a horse and rides to Mesa.

The Acting Sheriff pulls a gun on him, after seeing the stagecoach horses return. Steele shoots him first, but not fatally. He runs and is pursued by members of the town. He enters the back door of the bank to hide and overhears the banker talking to his partner.

A corrupt banker, Stanley, and his partner Joiner discuss their stagecoach holdup with Clanton, their hired gun. Joiner, upset over the deaths, begins to leave, but Stanley shoots him in the back.

Stanley tells the townspeople that Steele is responsible for the robbery and murder. Steele hides in the cellar of the house of sheriff Gil Corrigan, who has yellow fever. Gil is under the care of his daughter Nadine and the home is quarantined. Steele nurses the sheriff back to health after Nadine collapses from fatigue.

Nadine and Steele develop feelings for each other. Gil catches Nadine loading a pistol with the intention of giving it to Steele, and he explains his worries about Nadine's welfare and how taking bribes from Stanley over the years helped ensure her financial security.

Gil allows Steele to escape. As word of this spreads through the town, a lynch mob forms and comes to Gil's house. They drag him through town to a tree and prepare to hang him, but Steele returns to rescue him.

After freeing Gil, Steele kills Clanton while Gil places Stanley under arrest. It is suggested to Steele that he leave town, but he decides to remain.

== Cast ==
- Ray Milland as Wes Steele
- Mary Murphy as Nadine Corrigan
- Ward Bond as Sheriff Gil Corrigan
- Raymond Burr as Stanley
- Arthur Space as Doctor Mason
- Lee Van Cleef as Clanton
- Alan Hale as Acting Sheriff Jim Anderson
- Douglas Spencer as Henry Slocum
- Thomas B. Henry as Maybanks
- Grandon Rhodes as Luke Joiner
- Martin Garralaga as Ortega
- Kim Spalding as Sam Hall
- Howard J. Negley as Wilson

== Production ==
In August 1954, it was announced that Ray Milland would direct and star in a Republic Pictures Western, The Gunman. The film was based on an original script by John Tucker Battle and Talbot Jennings. Milland directed episodes of his 1953–55 sitcom Meet Mr. McNutley in order to prepare.

Filming began in March 1955. Parts of the film were shot in the sand dunes outside St. George, Utah. In April, the unit returned to Los Angeles.

Milland received a percentage of the profits. After A Man Alone, producer Herbert T. Yates hired Milland to direct one film per year for four years.

== Reception ==
In a contemporary review for the Los Angeles Times, critic Philip K. Scheuer wrote: "Milland's direction is, on a scene-by-scene basis, professional enough. For the first 25 minutes or so there were even intimations that he might rise into the exceptional class, for in these his 'man alone' was required to rely mostly on silence and pantomime to get over what was happening to him. Unfortunately, too much happens to him to be very credible."

In the Chicago Tribune, reviewer Will Leonard wrote: "Milland makes a pretty good western hero, once he finds his tongue after the first half hour. ... The love stuff may be a little too thick for thoro cowhand fans, but the heavy doses of gunplay make up for some of the sentiment."

Marjory Adams of The Boston Globe called A Man Alone "rich in suspense and audience appeal".

== See also ==
- List of American films of 1955
