= Lita Milan =

American actress (born 1933)

- Born: Iris Maria Lia Menshall; 1933 (age 92–93); Brooklyn, New York
- Occupation: Actress
- Years active: 1954–1959
- Spouse: Ramfis Trujillo (m. 1960; died 1969)
- Children: 2

Lita Milan, also known as Lita Trujillo (born Iris Maria Lia Menshall in 1933) is a former American actress. Her film credits include The Violent Men (1955), Desert Sands (1955), Gun Brothers (1956), The Ride Back (1957), Bayou (1957), The Left Handed Gun (1958), Never Love a Stranger (1958) and I Mobster (1959).

== Early years ==
Iris Maria Lia Menshall was born in New York City, the daughter of a salesman. She gave a memorable performance in S1 E33 of Have Gun – Will Travel, playing the chanteuse Mlle. Annette Vargas who inherits a mine in "The Silver Queen," which aired on May 3, 1958.

== Personal life ==
Milan married the son of former dictator of the Dominican Republic, Ramfis Trujillo, in 1960. They had two sons. In 1969, Trujillo died of pneumonia, following hospitalization for a traffic accident. For years she had a sentimental relationship with the spanish bullfighter Jaime Ostos.

In a 2013 interview, Milan said of her marriage: "It was a gallant kidnapping. He [Trujillo] was a dark prince on a white horse. But at the same time it was my mistake because I could have gone much further as an actress." She also described herself as "a sad figure. I have a tragic sense of life, although I always try to disguise it with frivolity, a way to alleviate sadness." In 2017 it was reported that Milan lives in Madrid, rarely makes public appearances, and has not appeared on television or film since 1959.

== Filmography ==
Year	Title	Role	Notes
1954	The Big Chase	Nurse	
1954	The Lone Wolf	Elena Montero	S1E22 "The Mexico Story"
1954	Passport to Danger	Actress	S1E26 "Paris"
1955	Public Defender	Andrea Jourdon	S2E22 "The Director"
1955	Damon Runyon Theater	Marie	S1E16 "A Light in France"
1955	Fireside Theatre	Anna	S1E9 "The Smuggler"
1955	It's a Great Life	Rochelle	S1E27 "Foster Father"
1955	The Violent Men	Elena	directed by Rudolph Maté
1955	Duel on the Mississippi	Yvette	Uncredited
1955	The Toughest Man Alive	Lida Velasco	
1955	Desert Sands	Alita	
1955-1956	The Star and the Story	Native Woman/Nina	2 episodes
1955-1957	The George Burns and Gracie Allen Show	Jeanette Duval/Maria Tornini	2 episodes
1955-1957	The Bob Cummings Show	Maria De Paulo/Ana Maria Scarpitti	4 episodes
1956	Gun Brothers	Meeteetse	
1956	Screen Directors Playhouse	Amelia	S1E26 "The Dream"
1956	The Sheriff of Cochise	Ruth	S1E4 "Manhunt"
1956	Tales of the 77th Bengal Lancers	Rani Suria	S1E2 "The Pawn"
1956-1957	The People's Choice	Senorita/Lee Collins	2 episodes
1957	Playhouse 90	Carmen	S1E30 "Four Women in Black"
1957	The Adventures of Jim Bowie	Bernadina Paolo	S1E27 "The Captain's Chimp"
1957	The Millionaire	Marise	S3E27 "The Jimmy Reilly Story"
1957	The Ride Back	Elena	
1957	The Adventures of Hiram Holliday	Marlene	5 episodes
1957	Whirlybirds	Luisa Cordoba	S1E33 "Incident in Del Rio"
1957	On Trial	Maria Bellini	S1E28 "The Secret of Polanta"
1957	Bayou	Marie Hebert	
1957	Naked in the Sun	Chechotah	
1958	Jefferson Drum	Chuli Ornitiz	S1E8 "Bandidos"
1958	Girls on the Loose	Marie Williams	directed by Paul Henreid
1958	Have Gun – Will Travel	Mlle. Annette Vargas	S1E33 "The Siver Queen"
1958	The Left Handed Gun	Celsa	
1958	Never Love a Stranger	Julie Cabell	
1958	Colgate Theatre	Amelia	S1E3 "Tonight in Havana"
1959	I Mobster	Teresa Porter	
