= John Truax =

American politician

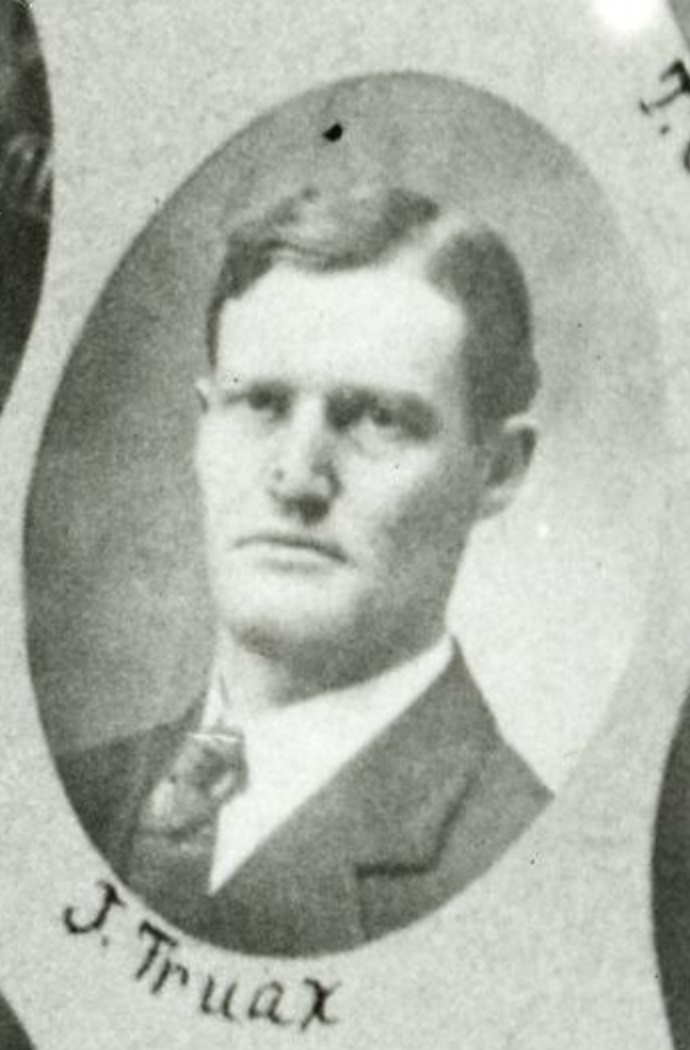
- Truax in 1913

Member of the Washington House of Representatives for the 15th district
- In office 1913–1915

Personal details
- Born: February 12, 1877 Calhoun County, Michigan, United States
- Died: May 14, 1930 (aged 53) Richland, Washington, United States
- Party: Republican
- Occupation: lawyer, judge

John Truax (February 12, 1877 – May 14, 1930) was an American politician in the state of Washington. He served in the Washington House of Representatives from 1913 to 1915. Truax died in 1930 in an accident in which he drowned after driving his car off of a ferry into the river in Richland, Washington.
