= Quantrill's Raiders (film) =

1958 film by Edward Bernds

- Directed by: Edward Bernds
- Written by: Polly James
- Produced by: Ben Schwalb
- Starring: Steve Cochran; Diane Brewster; Leo Gordon
- Cinematography: William P. Whitley (as William Whitley)
- Edited by: William Austin
- Music by: Marlin Skiles
- Color process: Color by DeLuxe
- Production company: Allied Artists Pictures
- Distributed by: Allied Artists Pictures
- Release date: April 27, 1958
- Running time: 71 minutes
- Country: United States
- Language: English

Quantrill's Raiders is a 1958 American CinemaScope Western film directed by Edward Bernds and starring Steve Cochran, Diane Brewster and Leo Gordon.

== Plot ==
A Civil War guerilla gang plans an attack on a Kansas arsenal.

== Cast ==
- Steve Cochran as Wes
- Diane Brewster as Sue
- Leo Gordon as Quantrill
- Gale Robbins as Kate
- Will Wright as Judge
- Kim Charney as Joel
- Myron Healey as Jarrett
- Robert Foulk as Hager
- Glenn Strange as Todd
- Lane Chandler as Sheriff
- Guy Prescott as Major
- Thomas Browne Henry as Griggs (as Thomas b. Henry)
