= Victor Millan =

American actor and academic (1920-2009)

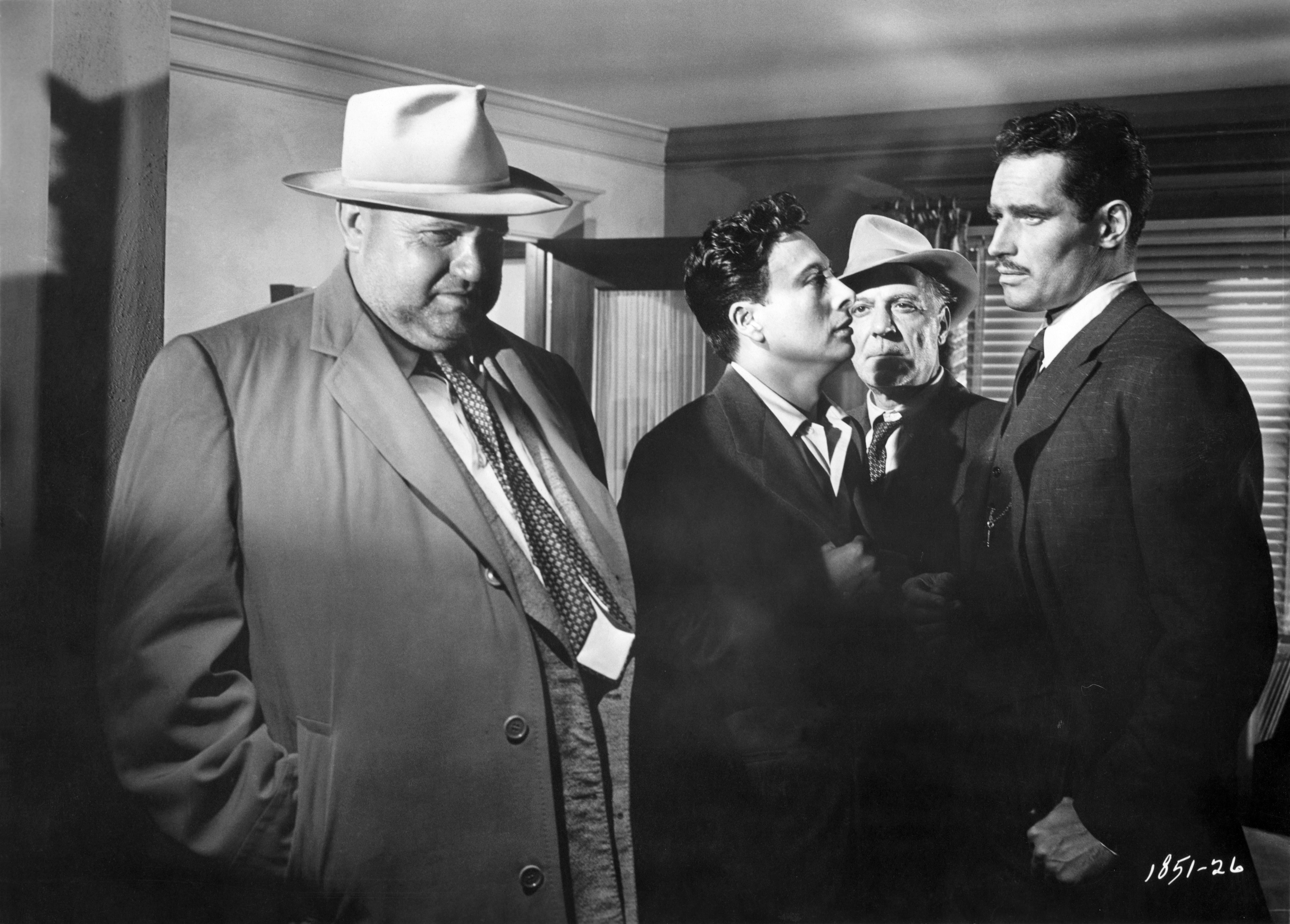
- Orson Welles, Victor Millan, Joseph Calleia and Charlton Heston in Touch of Evil (1958)
- Born: Joseph Brown; August 1, 1920; East Los Angeles, California, U.S.
- Died: April 3, 2009 (aged 88); Santa Monica, California, U.S.
- Education: University of California, Los Angeles
- Occupations: Theater professor; actor
- Years active: 1952–1989

Joseph Brown (August 1, 1920 – April 3, 2009), known professionally as Victor Millan, was an American actor, academic and former dean of the theatre arts department at Santa Monica College in Santa Monica, California.

== Early life ==
Brown was born on August 1, 1920 in East Los Angeles to Mexican parents who had emigrated to the United States during the Mexican Revolution. His mother was a seamstress from Durango. Brown first developed an interest in acting during junior high school. He graduated from Theodore Roosevelt High School. He served as a sergeant in the United States Army Air Corps during World War II. During the war, Brown was stationed in China, India and Burma.

He enrolled at the University of California, Los Angeles (UCLA) following the end of World War II. Brown earned both his bachelor's degree and his master's degree in theatre arts from UCLA.

== Career ==
Brown, who adopted the stage name Victor Millan during his acting career, had over eighty separate television and film credits, in addition to his theater work. Some of his earliest roles included the 1952 film, The Ring, which was directed by Kurt Neumann, as well as Walk the Proud Land, the Orson Welles-directed Touch of Evil, and The FBI Story. He played schoolteacher Rafael Guerra in the Wanted: Dead or Alive episode (S3 E14) "Witch Woman", opposite Jeannette Nolan as superstitious La Curandera (1960). In 1968, Millan appeared as Lazaro on The Big Valley series, in the episode titled "Miranda."

Millan's later film credits included Doc Savage: The Man of Bronze in 1975, and the 1983 film, Scarface starring Al Pacino, in which Millan played Ariel Bleyer.

He was an active member of the Screen Actors Guild.

He taught theatre arts at Santa Monica College for his entire academic teaching career, serving as the Dean of the theatre arts department for over twenty-five years.

Victor Millan died at his home in Santa Monica, California, on April 3, 2009, at the age of 88.

== Filmography ==
Year	Title	Role	Notes
1952	The Ring	Pablo	
1952	Horizons West	Mexican Soldier	Uncredited
1952	Thunderbirds	Pvt. Joe Lastchance	
1954	Elephant Walk	Koru, Servant	Uncredited
1954	Drum Beat	Indian	Uncredited
1955	Battle Cry	Pvt. Pedro	Uncredited
1955	Strange Lady in Town	Young Priest	Uncredited
1955	Apache Ambush	Manuel	Uncredited
1956	Walk the Proud Land	Santos	
1956	Giant	Angel Obregón Sr.	
1956	The Girl He Left Behind	Sgt. Storm Cloud	Uncredited
1957	The Ride Back	Father Ignatius	
1957	Escape from San Quentin	Mendez	Uncredited
1958	Touch of Evil	Manolo Sanchez	
1958	Terror in a Texas Town	Jose Mirada	
1959	The FBI Story	Mario	
1963	King Kong vs. Godzilla	Rodrigo Infanta	Uncredited
1968	The Pink Jungle	Helicopter Pilot	
1971	Hacksaw	Cascade Joe	
1975	Doc Savage: The Man of Bronze	Chief Chaac	
1976	W.C. Fields and Me	Spanish Translator	Uncredited
1979	Boulevard Nights	Mr. Landeros	
1983	Scarface	Ariel Bleyer	

== Television ==
Year 1972	Title Colombo, Season 2, Ep. 6	Role Detective Flores	Notes
1961	Wanted: Dead or Alive	Rafael Guerra	season 3 episode 14 (Witch woman)
