= Terror in a Texas Town =

1958 film by Joseph H. Lewis

- Theatrical release poster
- Directed by: Joseph Lewis
- Written by: Dalton Trumbo
- Produced by: John Seltzer
- Starring: Sterling Hayden
- Cinematography: Russell Harlan; Ray Rennahan
- Edited by: Stefan Arnsten
- Music by: Gerald Fried
- Production company: Seltzer Films
- Distributed by: United Artists
- Release date: 1958
- Running time: 81 minutes
- Country: United States
- Language: English

Terror in a Texas Town is a 1958 American Western film directed by Joseph H. Lewis (billed only as "Joseph Lewis") and starring Sterling Hayden, Nedrick Young, and Sebastian Cabot.

The script of Terror in a Texas Town was written by Dalton Trumbo. Due to Trumbo's status on the Hollywood blacklist as one of the Hollywood 10, Ben Perry initially received screenwriting credit, lending his name as a front for Trumbo. Both Nedrick Young, who contributed to the screenplay as well as acting in the film, and Sterling Hayden had also been subject to the Blacklist and the investigations of Communist influence in the movie industry by the House Committee on Un-American Activities.

Director Lewis was set to retire when his friend Young handed him the script, hoping to get him back into the film business. Excited by the script, Lewis agreed to do it because he had nothing to fear from working with blacklisted artists as it was to be his final film. He directed television episodes for several more years before retiring in 1966.

== Plot ==
Johnny Crale, a gunfighter clad in black, stands in the middle of a street in fictional Prairie City, facing an opponent, George Hansen, who is armed only with a whaler's harpoon.

In an extended flashback, we see the wealthy McNeil, who wants to control Prairie City and the land around it. He tries to burn out small ranchers and then hires gunfighter Johnny Crale—described as "Death walking around in the shape of a man"—to run them off. Crale, who wears a prosthetic right hand lost in a previous gunfight, has trained himself to be a deadly shot with his left hand.

Swedish immigrant Sven Hansen, who had once been a whaler, learns with his neighbor Jose Mirada that there is oil on their land. When Crale tries to coerce Sven into giving up his ranch, Sven refuses and Crale shoots him dead.

The dead man's son, George Hansen, arrives in town and finds out that his father has died, but is not sure how or why. The sheriff is in McNeil's pocket and unwilling to help, but George is determined to take over his father's ranch and to find out who killed his father. George tries talking to Molly, Crale's female companion, who only tells him that she is loyal to Crale because he is even lower than she is. George is set on by Crale and other men of McNeil, beaten unconscious, and dumped on a train leaving town. Coming to and in bad condition, George manages to walk back to the Mirada ranch, where he is cared for and told about the oil on his father's property.

In the meantime, the sheriff has informed Crale that Mirada had witnessed the murder of George's father, so Crale also heads to the Mirada ranch. Crale promises to spare Mirada's life if he gets on his knees and pledges to be silent about the killing, but Mirada replies that he knows that Crale will kill him anyway and dies standing. When Crale returns to McNeil's hotel room, he seems shaken, explaining "I saw a man who was not afraid to die." He tells McNeil that he intends to quit, but when McNeil angrily protests, Crale shoots his employer.

Now determined to avenge both his father and his friend, George meets Crale in the street armed only with his father's harpoon, returning the story to the opening scene. Crale shoots and wounds George, who still manages to hurl his own weapon and kill the gunslinger.

== Cast ==
- Sterling Hayden as George Hansen
- Sebastian Cabot as McNeil
- Carol Kelly as Molly
- Eugene Mazzola as Pepe Mirada (as Eugene Martin)
- Nedrick Young as Johnny Crale (as Ned Young)
- Victor Millan as Jose Mirada
- Frank Ferguson as Deacon Matt Holmes
- Marilee Earle as Mona Stacey

== Reception ==
As a low-budget Western, the film received little attention at the time of its release. A review in Variety characterized it as "handicapped by a slow-moving story" and "routine filler" as the bottom half of a double bill. Like other feature films by Joseph H. Lewis, such as Gun Crazy (1950), it has over the years acquired a cult following for Lewis's stylistic flourishes, leading some to describe it as a Western film noir. Rob Hunter, like some other critics, notes similarities in the themes of this film and Fred Zinnemann's big-budget, award-winning High Noon (1952): "There are two themes running through its short running time — the unfortunate reality that most people won't lift a finger to help others, whether out of disinterest or fear, and the even sadder awareness that this is a country that's long since stopped welcoming outsiders with open arms." Elements of the film, especially Sterling Hayden's unconvincing Swedish accent, are still criticized, but critic David Sterritt states that "Among important Westerns of the Fifties, only those of Anthony Mann and Samuel Fuller contain moods more potent or feelings more extreme than the ones Lewis directed ..." including this one.

== See also ==
- List of American films of 1958
