= I Mobster =

1958 film by Roger Corman

- Theatrical release poster
- Directed by: Roger Corman
- Produced by: Edward L. Alperson; Gene Corman; Roger Corman
- Starring: Steve Cochran; Lita Milan
- Music by: Gerald Fried
- Distributed by: 20th Century Fox
- Release date: 1959
- Running time: 81 minutes
- Country: United States
- Language: English
- Budget: $500,000

I Mobster (originally released in the UK as The Mobster) is a 1959 film noir crime-drama film directed by Roger Corman. The film features a cameo of famous burlesque star Lili St. Cyr.

== Plot ==
Joe Sante is a small time crook, who works as a bookie's runner and small time drug pusher. Through ruthlessness and hard work, he begins to climb the ranks of organized crime until he becomes one of the main crime czars in his city. Eventually, he is betrayed and killed by his criminal cohorts who desire his wealth and power.

Joe's first important job is running narcotics to individual customers at their homes. When "The Blonde" wants to pay for her dope with something "other than cash" Joe refuses because he has his eyes on a neighborhood girl, Teresa Porter, who is more his speed. Even as he grows in power, he turns up his nose at the "party girls" that attend Syndicate shindigs.

Joe eventually gets one year in jail for drug dealing, first offense. When he is released, Syndicate men meet him at the prison gate. They are impressed by his silence behind bars, and offer him a key spot if he will prove his loyalty by carrying out a murder contract. During a "Welcome Home Party" thrown him by his Mother, Joe slips out long enough to kill his assignment and return. But Teresa's younger brother Ernie has suspicions about what really happened.

By careful pick-and-choose, Joe has amassed a small fortune in labor union racketeering and has progressed to No.2 man in the Syndicate, with neighborhood pal Black Frankie as his right hand man. Out of love for Teresa and hoping to buy Ernie's silence, he gives them both jobs. But Ernie spends his salary on a narcotics habit, and one night barges in high as a kite waving a gun and threatening blackmail. Partly to protect Teresa and partly because he wants to, Joe shoots Ernie dead. Teresa is brought in for questioning but finds her love for Joe is too strong for her to implicate him. She throws caution to the wind and becomes Joe's mistress; and in one of his few decent acts, Joe remains loyal to her.

Syndicate boss Paul Moran is fearing Joe's growing power, and orders Black Frankie to kill him. Frankie tips Joe instead, and Joe ambush-kills Moran in his apartment house lobby. Joe is top man, and Black Frankie's power also grows.

But Joe has gotten too "notorious", and he is targeted by a U.S.Senate Crime Commission. He repeatedly takes the FIfth Amendment, but he senses the end is near. Black Frankie offers them passports and safe passage on a freighter out of the country. But enroute, their taxi comes under fire. Ordering the cabby to take Teresa to safety, Joe hops out and takes cover in an Army surplus storage yard. With plenty of armored tanks for cover, Joe manages to kill his two stalkers.

But when he returns to the apartment, wounded, where Black Frankie coldly tells him there never was a getaway ship, and shoots Joe dead in front of Teresa (who he allows to live). Joe is carted away by the same "body disposal unit" he had so often called to get rid of his corpses.

Joe's dying words are that someday Black Frankie will meet the same fate.

== Cast ==
- Steve Cochran as Joe Sante
- Lita Milan as Teresa Porter
- Robert Strauss as Black Frankie
- Celia Lovsky as Mrs. Sante
- Lili St. Cyr as herself
- John Brinkley as Ernie Porter
- Grant Withers as Paul Moran
- Yvette Vickers as The Blonde
- Frank Gerstle as District Attorney
- Robert Shayne as Senator
- Wally Cassell as Cherry Nose Sirago (adult)
- Jeri Southern as Singer
- Bruno VeSota as 300-pound nightclub owner (uncredited)
- George Cisar as Cab Driver in Final Chase (uncredited)
- John Mylong as Papa Sante (uncredited)

== Production ==
Gene Corman helped set up the film for his brother at a unit with Fox.

Filming started July 15, 1958. It was Corman's biggest budgeted production to date. Cochrane was borrowed from Robert Alexander Productions. Independent film producer Edward L. Alperson brought the screen play to Corman. The screenplay was written by Steve Fisher.

== Reception ==
Variety praised the movie, especially the portrait of Cochran's rise and fall. The magazine also praised the directing and acting in the movie. The Monthly Film Bulletin found the black humor to elevate the movie over its rather episodic story. CEA Film Report however found the movie offer nothing new or different. Corman thought the film lacked the depth of Machine Gun Kelly.

== See also ==
- List of American films of 1959
