= Mary Murphy (actress) =

American actress (1931–2011)

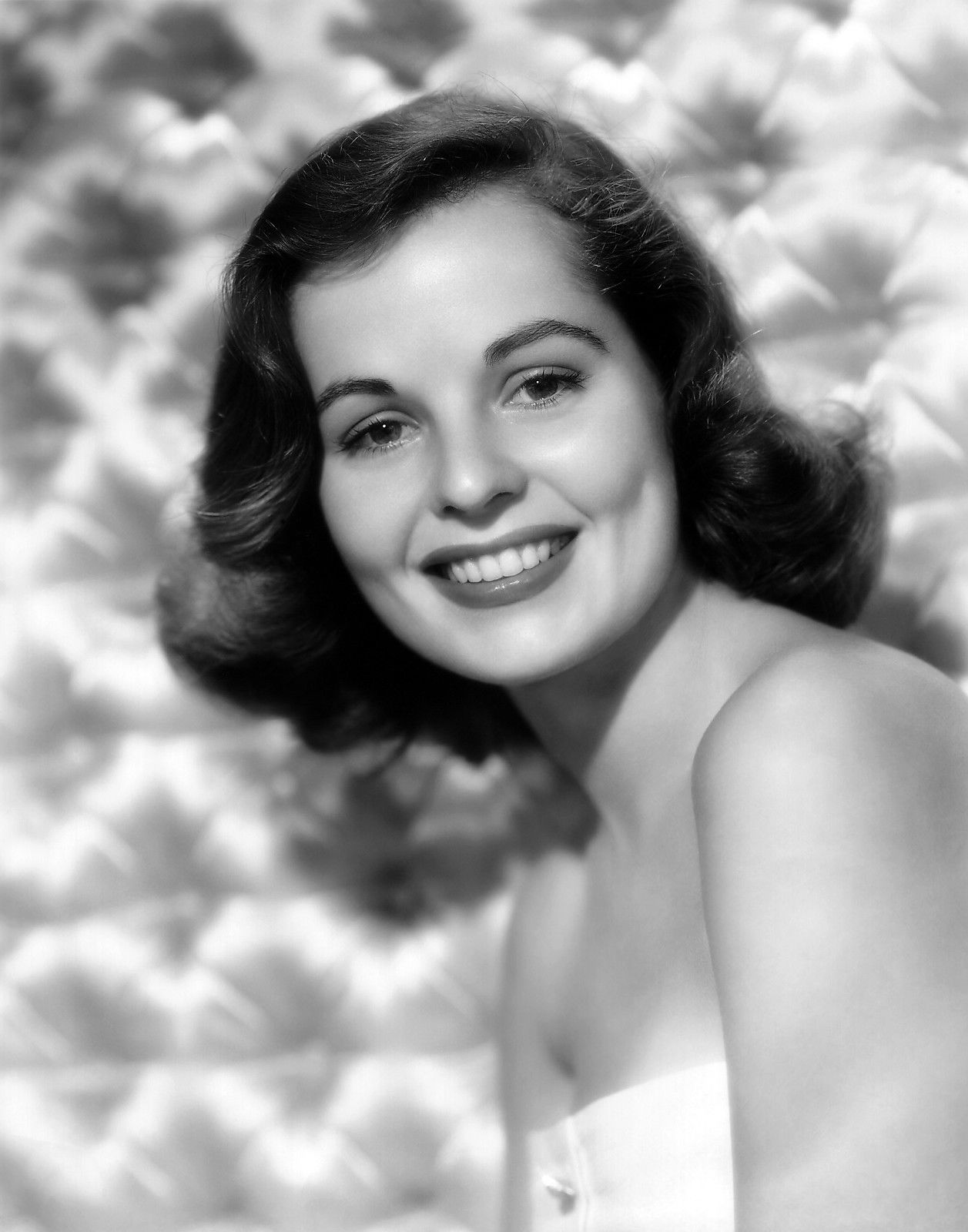
- Murphy in 1951
- Born: January 26, 1931; Washington, D.C., U.S.
- Died: May 4, 2011 (aged 80); Beverly Hills, California, U.S.
- Years active: 1951–1975
- Spouse(s): Dale Robertson (1956–1956; annulled); Alan Specht (1962–1967; divorced)
- Children: 1

Mary Murphy (January 26, 1931 – May 4, 2011) was an American film and television actress of the 1950s, '60s, and '70s.

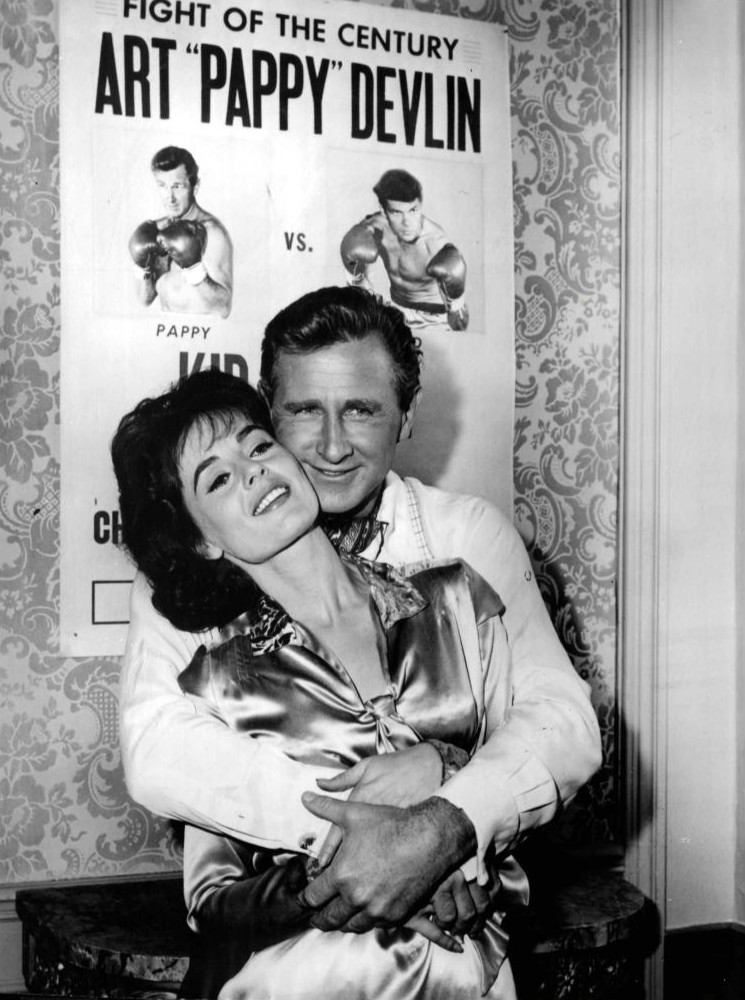
Murphy on The Lloyd Bridges Show (1963)

== Early years ==
Murphy was born in Washington, DC, and was the second of three children. She spent part of her early childhood in Rocky River, Ohio, a westside Cleveland suburb. Her father, James Victor Murphy, died in 1940. Shortly afterwards, she and her mother moved to Southern California. She attended University High School in West Los Angeles.

While working as a package wrapper at Saks Fifth Avenue, Beverly Hills, she was signed to appear in films for Paramount Pictures in 1951.

== Film ==
She first gained attention in 1953, when she played a good-hearted girl who is intrigued by Marlon Brando in The Wild One. The following year, she appeared opposite Tony Curtis in Beachhead, and with Dale Robertson in Sitting Bull, and the year after that as Fredric March's daughter in the thriller The Desperate Hours, which also starred Humphrey Bogart. She co-starred with actor-director Ray Milland in his Western A Man Alone. That was one of her best roles; another was in the film she made the following year for Joseph Losey, The Intimate Stranger (1956). She was absent from the big screen for seven years before resuming her film career in 1972 with Steve McQueen in Junior Bonner.

== Television ==
Murphy co-starred with James Franciscus and James Philbrook in the 1961 CBS crime adventure-drama series The Investigators. Among her other television appearances, she was featured in the title role of defendant Eleanor Corbin in the 1962 Perry Mason episode "The Case of the Glamorous Ghost". She also appeared in dozens of other television series, including The Lloyd Bridges Show, The Tab Hunter Show, Wagon Train, I Spy, The Outer Limits, The Fugitive, and Ironside.

== Personal life ==
On June 3, 1956, Murphy married actor Dale Robertson in Yuma, Arizona. The marriage was annulled after six months. She had a daughter. She married Alan Specht in 1962 and divorced in 1967.

== Death ==
On May 4, 2011, Murphy died of heart disease at her home in Beverly Hills, California, aged 80.

== Filmography ==
- The Lemon Drop Kid (1951) – Girl (uncredited)
- Darling, How Could You! (1951) – Sylvia
- When Worlds Collide (1951) – Student (uncredited)
- Westward the Women (1951) – Pioneer Woman (uncredited)
- My Favorite Spy (1951) – Manicurist (uncredited)
- Sailor Beware (1952) – Girl (uncredited)
- Aaron Slick from Punkin Crick (1952) – Girl in Bathtub (uncredited)
- The Atomic City (1952) – Young Woman Buying Stamps (uncredited)
- Carrie (1952) – Jessica Hurstwood
- The Turning Point (1952) – Secretary (uncredited)
- Off Limits (1952) – WAC
- Houdini (1953) – Girl (uncredited)
- Main Street to Broadway (1953) – Mary Craig, The Actress
- The Wild One (1953) – Kathie Bleeker
- Beachhead (1954) – Nina Bouchard
- Make Haste to Live (1954) – Randy Benson
- The Mad Magician (1954) – Karen Lee
- Sitting Bull (1954) – Kathy Howell
- Hell's Island (1955) – Janet Martin
- The Desperate Hours (1955) – Cindy Hilliard
- A Man Alone (1955) – Nadine Corrigan
- The Maverick Queen (1956) – Lucy Lee
- The Intimate Stranger (1956) – Evelyn Stewart
- Escapement (1958) – Ruth Vance
- Live Fast, Die Young (1958) – Kim Winters / Narrator
- Crime and Punishment U.S.A. (1959) – Sally
- The Restless Gun (1959) (Season 2 Episode 28: "Four Lives") – Mary Clayton
- Alfred Hitchcock Presents (1961) (Season 6 Episode 33: "A Secret Life") – Estelle
- Two Before Zero (1962)
- 40 Pounds of Trouble (1962) – Liz McCluskey
- Harlow (1965) – Sally Doane
- Junior Bonner (1972) – Ruth Bonner
- I Love You... Good-bye (1974) – Pam Parks
- Born Innocent (1974) – Miss Murphy

== Bibliography ==
- Parla, Paul; Mitchell, Charles P. (2000). "Mary Murphy: Wild One's Sweetheart". Screen Sirens Scream! Interviews with 20 Actresses from Science Fiction, Horror, Film Noir and Mystery Movies, 1930s to 1960s. Jefferson, N.C. and London: McFarland & Company. pp. 159–174. ISBN 0-7864-0701-8.
