= Sitting Bull (film) =

1954 film

- DVD cover
- Directed by: Sidney Salkow
- Written by: Screenplay: Jack DeWitt; Sidney Salkow
- Produced by: W. R. Frank
- Starring: Dale Robertson; Mary Murphy; J. Carrol Naish; John Litel; Joel Fluellen; Iron Eyes Cody; John Hamilton; Douglas Kennedy
- Cinematography: Víctor Herrera; Charles J. Van Enger
- Edited by: Richard L. Van Enger
- Music by: Score: Raoul Kraushaar; Song Great Spirit: Max Rich
- Production companies: W.R. Frank Productions; Tele-Voz S.A
- Distributed by: United Artists
- Release date: October 6, 1954
- Running time: 105 minutes
- Countries: United States; Mexico
- Language: English
- Box office: $1.5 million

Sitting Bull is a 1954 American-Mexican Eastmancolor Western film directed by Sidney Salkow and René Cardona that was filmed in Mexico in CinemaScope. In a greatly fictionalised form, it depicts the war between Sitting Bull and the American forces, leading up to the Battle of the Little Bighorn and Custer's Last Stand. It was the first independent production to be filmed in the CinemaScope process. Featuring sympathetic portrayals of Sitting Bull and Crazy Horse, The New York Times called it a "Crazy Horse opera".

== Plot ==
During mid-1876, the US Cavalry officer Robert Parrish (Dale Robertson) is considered by some to be his own worst enemy because he is not a "team player". Formerly one of the youngest colonels in the Union Army during the United States Civil War, he is now a company commander under Colonel George Armstrong Custer (Douglas Kennedy). His fiancée Kathy (Mary Murphy), daughter of Parrish's commanding general, breaks off their engagement because he has not risen in rank.

Parrish gains no friends among the civilian community when he chastises them and threatens to "break heads" when they violate Sioux lands. Custer and Parrish's exasperated general and once prospective father-in-law reassigns Parrish and his company to the Bureau of Indian Affairs, where Parrish is outraged at the treatment of the Indians and refuses to carry out the orders of the Indian agent to shoot his escaping charges. Parrish is court-martialed and visits his former commanding general—now President of the United States of America--Ulysses S. Grant—who demotes him to captain. Parrish convinces the President to come to the Western frontier to meet Sitting Bull and prevent a war.

Back in the West, now-Captain Parrish meets Kathy, who has announced her engagement to Charles Wentworth (William Hopper), a former major and now a war correspondent. Using captured Indians, including Sam, a former slave now a Sioux, Parrish meets with Sitting Bull (J. Carrol Naish), who agrees to meet the President secretly. Further conflicts with the Sioux lead Custer to lead his regiment out, assigning Parrish to guard supplies. When Sitting Bull sees that one of his scouts observing Custer has been killed, he agrees to war.

Following the Battle of the Little Bighorn that eliminates Custer, most of his men, and his romantic rival Wentworth, Parrish tries to befriend Sitting Bull and war leader Crazy Horse (Iron Eyes Cody). As Parrish knows the US Cavalry's plan of attack, he leads the Sioux to safety in the North. Parrish is court-martialed again, stripped of his rank, and sentenced to death by firing squad for treason. Sam tells Kathy that Native Americans will never make peace if the Army kills the Sioux's friend Parrish, and she decides to ask Sitting Bull to tell Grant this.

As the execution is about to take place, Sitting Bull, led by Kathy, comes to the fort to speak with Grant. Parrish had told him, "the Great Chief will understand," believing he would show mercy to him because his only intention was to prevent more killing. Sitting Bull pleads with Grant to spare his life. Grant then commutes his sentence. After Parrish is freed, Kathy and he kiss. Sitting Bull raises his hand in salute and rides off with his people.

== Cast ==
- Dale Robertson as Major Robert 'Bob' Parrish
- Mary Murphy as Kathy Howell
- J. Carrol Naish as Sitting Bull
- John Litel as Gen. Wilford Howell
- Joel Fluellen as Sam
- Iron Eyes Cody as Crazy Horse (credited as "Famous T.V. Star" and technical adviser)
- John Hamilton as President Ulysses S. Grant
- Douglas Kennedy as Col. George Armstrong Custer
- William Tannen as O'Connor
- William Hopper as Charles Wentworth

== Production ==
Boris Karloff was first announced to play the title role, but J. Carrol Naish ended up repeating his role from Annie Get Your Gun.

Though sympathetic to the Native Americans, Minnesota producer Wilfred R. Frank irritated the Sioux by not filming his epic at the Standing Rock Indian Reservation. One of the first Westerns made in CinemaScope, Frank filmed in Mexico (using Mexican extras) due to cheaper costs. According to Cody, though, Estudios Churubusco overcharged Frank's production by several hundred thousand dollars.

Soon after the filming, Dale Robertson and Mary Murphy married each other, but the marriage was annulled after six months because Robertson did not want any children.

== Quotes ==
"When the white man wins, you call it a victory; when the Indian wins, you call it a massacre." – Sitting Bull

== Legacy ==
Salkow and Cody later reteamed for the 1965 film The Great Sioux Massacre for Columbia Pictures that used stock footage from Sitting Bull.
