= Albert C. Gannaway =

American film director

Albert C. Gannaway II
- Born: April 3, 1920
- Died: August 27, 2008 (aged 88)
- Occupations: Film director, producer and screenwriter

Albert C. Gannaway (April 3, 1920 – August 27, 2008) was an American film director, producer, screenwriter, songwriter, and owner of a record company. He is best known for Stars of the Grand Ole Opry. Gannaway wrote for major artists such as Nat King Cole, Frank Sinatra, and Bob Hope.

== Career ==
Gannaway produced the children's talent program Half-Pint Party on WCBS-TV and was listed as star and co-owner of It's a Small World, an audience-participation TV program that was being filmed in 1952. Gannaway is best known for Stars of The Grand Ole Opry. Gannaway was the first person to film in 35mm color film. Prior to this success, Gannaway started a record company writing for Nat King Cole, Johnny Mercer, Frank Sinatra, Bob Hope, among many others.

He directed western films such as Hidden Guns (1956), Raiders of Old California (1957), starring Faron Young, Marty Robbins; Man or Gun (1958), and Plunderers of Painted Flats (1959). Buffalo Gun (1961), starring Webb Pierce; He also directed Rebellion in Cuba (1961) starring Lon Chaney Jr. and Jake La Motta.

He produced and directed the pioneer Daniel Boone, Trail Blazer (1956) along Ismael Rodríguez starring Bruce Bennett in the title role along with Lon Chaney Jr., Faron Young, Kem Dibbs, Damian O'Flynn and Jacqueline Evans. The songs were scored by Gannaway and sang by Hal Levy.

The script of Conspiracy of Hearts (1960) was optioned by Gannaway in 1958. He directed the 1958 drama film No Place to Land, about crop-duster pilots in post-war rural California competing with each other for work and starring John Ireland.

He died on 27 August 2008 at the age of 88.

== Filmography ==
Year	Title	Director	Soundtrack	Writer
1991	Webb Pierce and Chet Atkins	✓	✓	
1980	Country Diary		✓	
1966	Mr. Angel	✓	✓	
1964	Country Music Caravan		✓	
1961	Rebellion in Cuba	✓	✓	
1961	Buffalo Gun	✓		
1959	Plunderers of Painted Flats	✓	✓	
1958	No Place to Land	✓	✓	
1958	Man or Gun	✓	✓	
1957	Raiders of Old California	✓	✓	
1957	The Badge of Marshal Brennan	✓	✓	
1956	Daniel Boone, Trail Blazer	✓	✓	
1956	Hidden Guns	✓	✓	✓
1955	Grand Ole Opry		✓	

== Bibliography ==
- Martin, Len D. (13 August 2015). The Republic Pictures Checklist: Features, Serials, Cartoons, Short Subjects and Training Films of Republic Pictures Corporation, 1935-1959. McFarland Publishing. p. 391. ISBN 9781476609607.
