= Harry Lauter =

American actor (1914–1990)

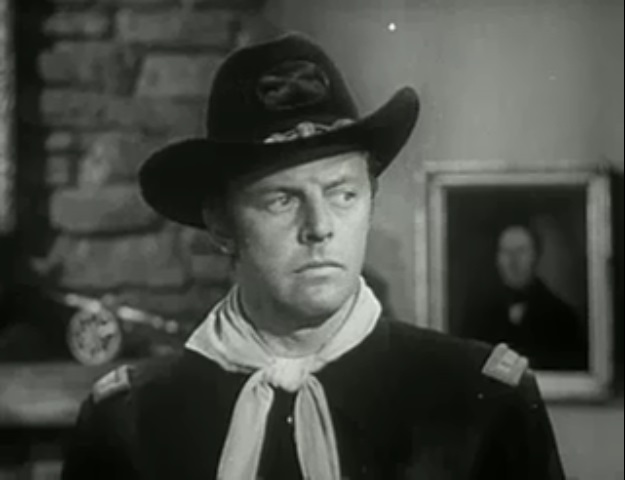
- Lauter in a screenshot from Raiders of Old California (1957)
- Born: Herman Arthur Lauter; June 19, 1914; White Plains, New York, U.S.
- Died: October 30, 1990 (aged 76); Ojai, California, U.S.
- Occupations: Actor (1930–1979); Artist (1979–1990)
- Years active: 1930–1990
- Spouses: Barbara Jane Ayres (m. 1952; div. 1975) Doris Jean Gilbert (m. 1975)
- Children: 2, plus 2 stepchildren

Herman Arthur "Harry" Lauter (June 19, 1914 – October 30, 1990) was an American character actor.

== Early years ==
Lauter was born in White Plains, New York. He worked as a model for a professional photographer and was a rodeo rider before moving into acting.

Lauter came from an entertainment-oriented family, with his father and grandfather having been part of The Flying Lauters trapeze act.

== Career ==
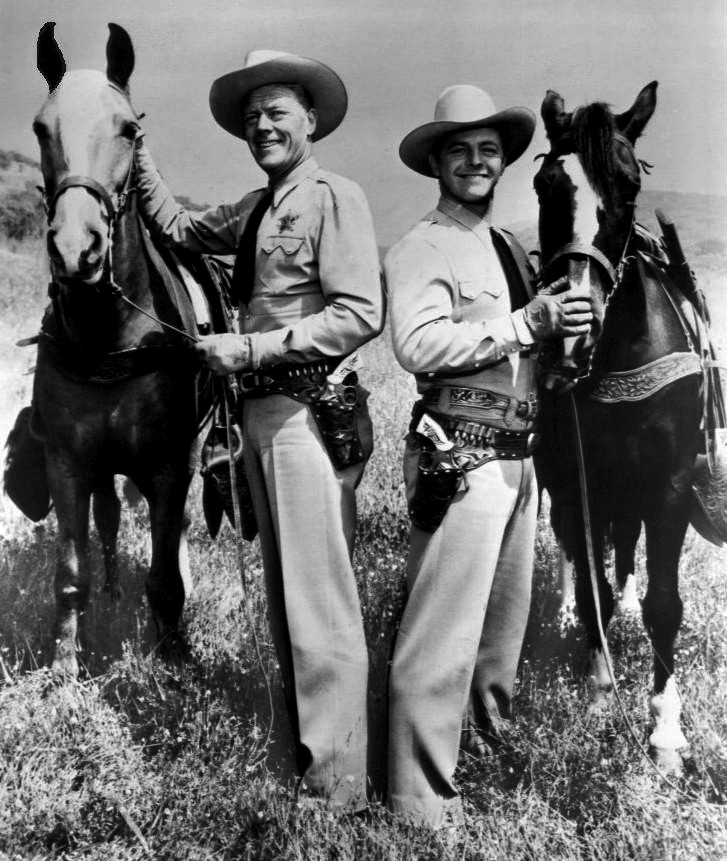
Lauter (right) with Willard Parker in Tales of the Texas Rangers, 1957.

Lauter's acting break came with a role in The Magnificent Rogue (1946), in which he played a model.

He was a seen in supporting roles in low-budget films, serials (where he was often cast because of his facial resemblance to stuntman Tom Steele, who would double for him), and seemingly innumerable television programs in the 1950s. Only once did he really come close to stardom, as Clay Morgan, one of the leads in the CBS television series Tales of the Texas Rangers, which aired fifty-two episodes from 1955 to 1958. His co-star was Willard Parker as Ranger Jace Pearson.

Lauter portrayed Ralph Cotton on the television version of The Roy Rogers Show. He made appearances on many television programs, particularly westerns: The Gene Autry Show (sixteen episodes), Annie Oakley (twelve episodes), The Lone Ranger and The Range Rider (eleven episodes each), Gunsmoke and Rawhide (ten episodes each), Death Valley Days and The Adventures of Ozzie and Harriet (seven episodes each), Laramie and Dick Powell's Zane Grey Theatre (six episodes each), The Virginian and State Trooper (five times each), and Cheyenne, Bonanza, and Maverick (three episodes each). In the 1958 episode of Tombstone Territory, "The Rebels Last Charge" as the guest star, he was cast as Confederate Sgt, Shelton, a member of a raider group of Confederate soldiers (this is supposed to be 1881) led by Richard Reeves. Harry dies (as usual), but it's a heroic death; he kills the renegade Apache chief, which ends the Indian attack and, in so doing, saves the rest of the cast involved in the fight.

In a departure from his appearance in westerns, he played the character of Atlasand, chief officer to Cleolanta the evil Suzerain of Ophesius, in several episodes of Rocky Jones, Space Ranger in 1953.

Lauter appeared twice as Johnny Tyler in 1959–1960 in two episodes of the ABC/Warner Brothers western series Colt .45, starring Wayde Preston.

Lauter was cast twice on the NBC children's western series Fury, with Peter Graves and Bobby Diamond, and on Tombstone Territory, starring Pat Conway. Lauter also appeared on NBC's Jefferson Drum, National Velvet, and Riverboat, on CBS's Have Gun - Will Travel, with Richard Boone, and the syndicated western-themed crime drama U.S. Marshal. In 1958 he appeared in the episode "Rodeo", along with Lee Van Cleef, Barbara Baxley, and Dan Blocker, on the CBS crime drama Richard Diamond, Private Detective, starring David Janssen. Later he guest-starred in the 1962–1963 ABC drama series Going My Way with Gene Kelly. He also made a guest appearance in 1963 on CBS's Perry Mason in "The Case of the Potted Planter."

He appeared in The Wild Wild West S3 E17 "The Night of the Headless Woman" as Marshal (1967). His last screen appearance was in 1979 as Marshal Charlie Benton in James Arness's ABC series How the West Was Won.

Most of his career was spent as a capable second lead as a hero or a heavy, though he continued to play bit parts in larger pictures, including an uncredited part as a plain-clothes policeman in the 1949 crime drama White Heat, which starred James Cagney and Edmond O'Brien. He also had an uncredited, non-speaking role in the 1963 Stanley Kramer comedy It's a Mad, Mad, Mad, Mad World as a police dispatcher.

The son of an artist, Lauter devoted much of his energy late in his life to his own painting and the operation of an art gallery.

== Personal life ==
Lauter was married to Barbara Ayres. They divorced in February 1975, and in November of that year, he married fellow painter Doris Gilbert.

== Death ==
Lauter died of a heart attack on October 30, 1990, in Ojai in Ventura County, California, at age 76. He was survived by his wife, two children and two step-children.

== Selected filmography ==
- The Big Broadcast of 1938 (1938) as Sailor (uncredited)
- The Magnificent Rogue (1946) as Boy Model (uncredited)
- Hit Parade of 1947 (1947) as Handsome Boy (uncredited)
- Let's Live Again (1948) as Bit (uncredited)
- A Foreign Affair (1948) as Corporal (uncredited)
- The Gay Intruders (1948) as Male Secretary
- Moonrise (1948) as Man Dancing with Gilly (uncredited)
- Incident (1948) as Bill Manning
- Parole, Inc. (1948) as Donald Perkins (uncredited)
- Jungle Patrol (1948) as Lt. Derby
- Life of St. Paul Series (1949) as Man in Antioch
- State Department: File 649 (1949) as Foreign Service Trainee (uncredited)
- Prince of the Plains (1949) as Tom Owens
- Tucson (1949) as George Reeves Jr.
- Frontier Investigator (1949) as Rocky's Brother
- Alimony (1949) as Doctor
- The Great Dan Patch (1949) as Bud Ransome
- I Was a Male War Bride (1949) as Naval Lt. Perkins (uncredited)
- Slattery's Hurricane (1949) as Control Tower Operator (uncredited)
- Bandit King of Texas (1949) as Trem Turner
- Zamba (1949) as Jim
- White Heat (1949) as Man with Microphone in Back Seat of Car (uncredited)
- Without Honor (1949) as Ambulance Attendant
- Twelve O'Clock High (1949) as Radio Officer (uncredited)
- Blue Grass of Kentucky (1950) as Dick Wentworth
- When Willie Comes Marching Home (1950) as Aide (uncredited)
- 711 Ocean Drive (1950) as Flirty Man at Bar (uncredited)
- The Great Jewel Robber (1950) as Reporter (uncredited)
- The Showdown (1950) as Cowhand (uncredited)
- No Way Out (1950) as Orderly (uncredited)
- Bunco Squad (1950) as James Worth (uncredited)
- Between Midnight and Dawn (1950) as Detective (uncredited)
- I'll Get By (1950) as Assistant Director (uncredited)
- Flying Disc Man from Mars (1950, Serial) as Henchman Drake
- Experiment Alcatraz (1950) as Richard 'Dick' McKenna
- Counterspy Meets Scotland Yard (1950) as Agent Don Martin (uncredited)
- The Flying Missile (1950) as Army Base Information Desk Clerk (uncredited)
- The Day the Earth Stood Still as Lt. Platoon Leader (uncredited)
- Bowery Battalion (1951) as Lt. Branson (uncredited)
- Operation Pacific (1951) as Freddie - Officer on Submarine Corvena (uncredited)
- Call Me Mister (1951) as Soldier (uncredited)
- Silver City Bonanza (1951) as Pete Horne
- Inside Straight (1951) as Hal - Ada's Business Assistant (uncredited)
- Thunder in God's Country (1951) as Marshal Tim Gallery
- Whirlwind (1951) as Wade Trimble
- According to Mrs. Hoyle (1951) as Gordon Warren
- Lorna Doone (1951) as Calvin Oates Jr. (uncredited)
- Let's Go Navy! (1951) as Dalton V. Dalton (uncredited)
- Flying Leathernecks (1951) as Freddie (uncredited)
- The Mob (1951) as Daniels - Mobile Unit #2 Detective (uncredited)
- Roadblock (1951) as Saunders (uncredited)
- The Hills of Utah (1951) as Henchman Evan Fox
- Come Fill the Cup (1951) as Cameron - Ives' Pilot (uncredited)
- The Racket (1951) as Officer Mosley (uncredited)
- The Kid from Amarillo (1951) as Tom Mallory
- Valley of Fire (1951) as Tod Rawlings
- I Want You (1951) as Art Stacey (uncredited)
- The Steel Fist (1952) as Franz
- This Woman Is Dangerous (1952) as Trooper (uncredited)
- Rancho Notorious (1952) as Deputy at Gunsight (uncredited)
- Bugles in the Afternoon (1952) as Cpl. Jackson (uncredited)
- Night Train to Galveston (1952) as Evans (uncredited)
- Talk About a Stranger (1952) as Clarence the Bookkeeper (uncredited)
- Sound Off (1952) as Laughing Corporal (uncredited)
- Red Ball Express (1952) as Lt. Michaelson, Sentry (uncredited)
- Apache Country (1952) as Dave Kilrain
- The Winning Team (1952) as Eddie Collins (scenes deleted)
- Sea Tiger (1952) as Randall, alias Jon Edmun
- Yukon Gold (1952) as Ace Morgan
- Battle Zone (1952) as Marine Intelligence Officer (uncredited)
- Androcles and the Lion (1952) as Officer (uncredited)
- Prince of Pirates (1953) as Jan
- I Love Melvin (1953) as Look Magazine Board of Directors (uncredited)
- Rocky Jones, Space Ranger (1953) as Atlasand
- The Marshal's Daughter (1953) as Russ Mason
- Pack Train (1953) as Roy (uncredited)
- Canadian Mounties vs. Atomic Invaders (1953, Serial) as Clark, a Mountie [Ch.12]
- Topeka (1953) as Mack Wilson
- The Fighting Lawman (1953) as Outlaw Al Clark - aka Al Deacons
- The Big Heat (1953) as Hank O'Connell (uncredited)
- Crime Wave (1953) as Roadblock Officer (uncredited)
- Flight Nurse (1953) as MATS Cargoman (uncredited)
- Fighter Attack (1953) as Lieutenant Duncan
- Forbidden (1953) as Holly (uncredited)
- Trader Tom of the China Seas (1954, Serial) as Tom Rogers
- Riot in Cell Block 11 (1954) as Prison Switchboard Operator (uncredited)
- The Boy from Oklahoma (1954) as Jim (uncredited)
- Dragonfly Squadron (1954) as Capt. Vedders
- Yankee Pasha (1954) as Dick Bailey
- They Rode West (1954) as Orderly (uncredited)
- The Forty-Niners (1954) as Gambler
- Captain Kidd and the Slave Girl (1954) as Mutineer (uncredited)
- Return to Treasure Island (1954) as Parker
- Dragnet (1954) as Officer Greeley (uncredited)
- The Bob Mathias Story (1954) as Irving Mondschein (uncredited)
- The Eternal Sea (1955) as Lt. Martin (pilot) (uncredited)
- Outlaw Treasure (1955) as Jesse James
- Lord of the Jungle (1955) as Pilot (uncredited)
- King of the Carnival (1955) as Bert King
- Not as a Stranger (1955) as Harry, Radio Broadcaster (uncredited)
- It Came from Beneath the Sea (1955) as Deputy Bill Nash
- Creature with the Atom Brain (1955) as Reporter #1
- Apache Ambush (1955) as Bailey (uncredited)
- The Crooked Web (1955) as Sgt. Mike Jancoweizc
- Dig That Uranium (1955) as Ron Haskell
- At Gunpoint (1955) as Federal Marshal
- Women Without Men (1956) as U.S. State Dept. Security Chief
- The Man in the Gray Flannel Suit (1956) as Army Corporal on Leave (uncredited)
- The Three Outlaws (1956) as Army Recruiting Sergeant (uncredited)
- The Werewolf (1956) as Deputy Ben Clovey
- Earth vs. the Flying Saucers (1956) as Cutting - Generator Technician (uncredited)
- Miami Exposé (1956) as Det. Tim Grogan
- Gun Brothers (1956) as Deputy (uncredited)
- Tension at Table Rock (1956) as Stagecoach Shotgun Rider (uncredited)
- The Women of Pitcairn Island (1956) as Ben Fish
- The Badge of Marshal Brennan (1957) as Doc Hale
- Hellcats of the Navy (1957) as Lt. (j.g.) Wes Barton
- Shootout at Medicine Bend (1957) as Briggs (uncredited)
- The Oklahoman (1957) as Grant (uncredited)
- The Lawless Eighties (1957) as Andy Bowers (uncredited)
- Death in Small Doses (1957) as Steve Hummel / Mr. Brown
- Jet Pilot (1957) as Sergeant (uncredited)
- Raiders of Old California (1957) as Lt. Scott Johnson
- Official Detective series Episode "Bombing Terror" (1958) as Richards
- Return to Warbonnet (1958) as Tom - Deputy Sheriff (uncredited)
- Toughest Gun in Tombstone (1958) as Joe Barger
- The Case Against Brooklyn (1958) as Rookie Cop (uncredited)
- Tarzan's Fight for Life (1958) as Dr. Ken Warwick
- The Cry Baby Killer (1958) as Police Lt. Porter
- Girl on the Run (1958) as Drunk
- The Last Hurrah (1958) as Votes Tallyman (uncredited)
- Good Day for a Hanging (1959) as Matt Fletcher (uncredited)
- The Louisiana Hussy (1959) as Clay Lanier
- The Gunfight at Dodge City (1959) as City Marshal Ed Masterson
- Date with Death (1959) as Lt. George Caddell
- Gunsmoke (1960) as Martin
- Key Witness (1960) as Police Officer Hurley (uncredited)
- Posse from Hell (1961) as Russell
- Buffalo Gun (1961) as Vin
- Lonely Are the Brave (1962) as Deputy in Canyon (uncredited)
- The Wild Westerners (1962) as Jud Gotch
- Showdown (1963) as Bartender (uncredited)
- It's a Mad, Mad, Mad, Mad World (1963) as Police Dispatcher (uncredited)
- The Satan Bug (1965) sa Fake SDI Agent
- Fort Courageous (1965) as Joe
- Harlow (1965) as Bus Driver (uncredited)
- The Convict Stage (1965) as Ben Lattimore - Starring Role - 1st Billing
- Ambush Bay (1966) as Cpl. Alvin Ross
- Batman (1966) as Mr Merrick, Times Reporter (uncredited)
- For Pete's Sake (1966) as Police Officer credited as Harry Lauder
- Return of the Gunfighter (1967) as Frank Marlowe (uncredited)
- Fort Utah (1967) as Britches
- More Dead Than Alive (1969) as Doctor
- Paint Your Wagon (1969) as Peddler (uncredited)
- Zig Zag (1970) as Detective (uncredited)
- Barquero (1970) as Steele
- Escape from the Planet of the Apes (1971) as General Winthrop
- The Todd Killings (1971)
- Superbeast (1972) as Stewart Victor (final film role)

== Selected television ==
Year	Title	Role	Notes
1953	Death Valley Days	Fred 'Fraction' Thompson	Season 1, Episode 7, "The Chivaree"
1954	Death Valley Days	Thad Ryker	Season 2, Episode 12, "Jimmy Dayton's Treasure"
1959	Rawhide	Billy Grant	S1:E4, "Incident of the Widowed Dove"
1959	Rawhide	Garrison	S2:E8, "Incident of the Haunted Hills"
1961	Sea Hunt	USCG Captain	Season 4, Episode 37 "Crime at Sea",
1960	Have Gun - Will Travel	Crawford - Miner	Episode "The Legacy" (1960)
1960	Bat Masterson	Sheriff Conners	Episode "The Reluctant Witness"
1961	Rawhide	Bartender	S3:E26, "Incident of the Painted Lady"
1961	Rawhide	Kirby	S4:E10, "The Blue Spy"
1962	Rawhide	Reagan	S4:E29, "The Devil and the Deep Blue"
1962	Rawhide	Hank	S5:E11, "Incident of the Reluctant Bridegroom"
1963	Rawhide	Capt. Ross	S5:E25, "Incident of the Clown"
1963	Rawhide	Orville Tippet	S6:E10, "Incident at Confidence Creek"
1964	Gunsmoke	Outlaw Leach	Episode "Big Man, Big Target" (S10E10)
1964	The Beverly Hillbillies	Motorcycle policeman	S2:E33, "Granny Learns to Drive"
1964	Rawhide	Maj. Blaine	S6:E18, "Incident at Gila Flats"
1965	Rawhide	Lenny	S7:E25, "The Last Order"
1965	Rawhide	Wrangler	S8:E2, "Ride a Crooked Mile"
1965	Rawhide	Yank McCabe	S8:E11, "Brush War at Buford"
1965	Gunsmoke	Gregory Bellow	S10:E34, "Honey Pot"
1966	Voyage to the Bottom of the Sea	Commander Finch	S3:E7, "Deadly Waters"
1967	The Beverly Hillbillies	Captain	S6:E13, "The South Rides Again"
1974	Chopper One	Chapman	S1:E10, "Deadly Carrier"
