= Man or Gun =

1958 film

- Theatrical release poster
- Directed by: Albert C. Gannaway
- Screenplay by: Vance Skarstedt; James J. Cassity
- Produced by: Vance Skarstedt
- Starring: Macdonald Carey; Audrey Totter; James Craig; James Gleason; Warren Stevens; Harry Shannon
- Cinematography: Jack A. Marta
- Edited by: Betty Lane
- Music by: Gene Garf; Ramey Idriss
- Production company: Albert C. Gannaway Productions
- Distributed by: Republic Pictures
- Release date: May 30, 1958
- Running time: 79 minutes
- Country: United States
- Language: English

Man or Gun is a 1958 American Western film directed by Albert C. Gannaway and written by Vance Skarstedt and James J. Cassity. The film stars Macdonald Carey, Audrey Totter, James Craig, James Gleason, Warren Stevens and Harry Shannon. The film, shot in Naturama was released on May 30, 1958, by Republic Pictures.

== Plot ==
After losing his horse in the desert ‘Maybe’ Smith (Macdonald Carey) stumbles on a water hole where he finds a grave and a bed roll with a distinctive pistol (a Colt western 44), and holster inside. The gun becomes central to the story as some people believe it gives the wearer an extra edge.

Smith enters Dutch Flats and at the local saloon encounters a couple of trouble makers whom he outdraws and kills. The saloon owner Fran (Audrey Totter) lets Smith know that one of the men he killed, Buckstorm Corley, has a $2000 bounty on him.

Fran meets with her partner and admirer Mike Ferris (Warren Stevens) and tells him that she thinks Smith is actually Scott Yancey, a notorious gunman. She also describes how the Corley clan runs the town and that the sheriff is useless. They decide to play the Corley’s against Smith to get rid of the Corley family.

Smith then meets with Sheriff Jim Jackson (James Gleason) to collect the bounty and lets him know that he really only wants to buy a piece of land and be a farmer. The sheriff tells him of a 12 acre piece of property that is available. Smith then uses the bounty to buy it.

Ferris puts the plan in action by letting know about Justin Corley (Harry Shannon) Buckstorm’s death and then visits Smith urging him to deal with them. Smith goes to town and tries to get the Sheriff to do something but he declines out of a lack of courage. Smith then dispatches two more of the Corley clan in the saloon.

Smith meets with Fran and she tries to convince him to take over the Sheriff’s job so they can take over the town. He declines and lets her know that he knows what she is trying to do and then tells her that the only reason he met with her was to court her but after hearing her plan changes his mind and leaves.

Ferris, realizing that Smith and Fran are interested in each other, hires Pinch Corley (James Craig) to kill Smith. He lets Pinch know that he wants Smith’s gun believing that it is special. When Ferris is getting the money to pay Pinch out of the saloon safe Fran confronts him and he lets her know that he plans to take over with or without her.

Fran has a change of heart and lets Smith know Ferris’s plan. Smith sets a trap for Pinch and his cohorts and shoots the gun out of Pinch’s hand and lets him live. In the meantime Ferris goes back to the saloon, believing that Smith will soon be dead, and tells Fran than he plans to make her his wife whether she likes it or not.

Smith then rides to town and confronts Ferris in the saloon and they get into a fight which Ferris wins. During the fight Smith dropped the gun which Ferris then picks up and goes out in the street planning to ambush Smith. In the meantime Justin Corley is setting up to ambush Smith himself. As Smith exits the saloon Pinch rides into town. Old man Corley gets excited thinking Pinch will kill Smith, instead Pinch walks up to Smith and then helps defend him against the ambush.

Pinch is wounded in the battle and Ferris and Justin’s men are all killed. Smith sells the gun to the sheriff for a dollar and leaves with Fran. The sheriff approaches with a new sense of confidence believing that the gun is special.

== Cast ==
- Macdonald Carey as 'Maybe' Smith / Scott Yancey
- Audrey Totter as Fran Dare
- James Craig as Pinch Corley
- James Gleason as Sheriff Jim Jackson
- Warren Stevens as Mike Ferris
- Harry Shannon as Justin Corley
- Jil Jarmyn as Mrs. Pinch Corley
- Robert Burton as Deputy Sheriff Burt Burton
- Ken Lynch as Buckstorm Corley
- Karl Davis as Swede
- Julian Burton as Billy Corley
- Carl York as Jack Corley
- Harry Klekas as Dodd
- Mel Gaines as Diego
- Ron McNeil as Nick
- Larry Grant as Jake
