= Edward Colmans =

American actor

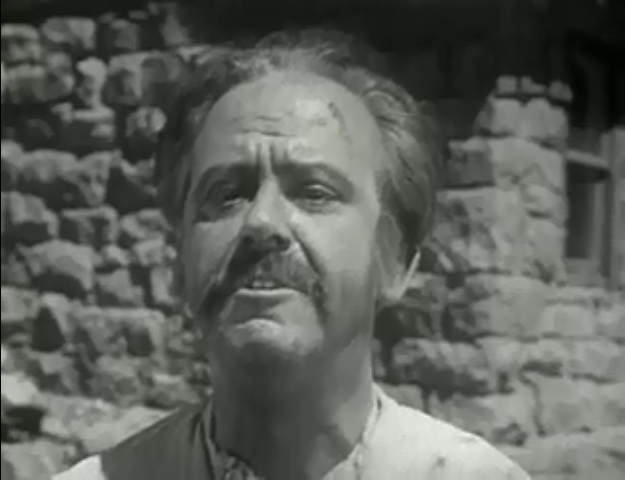
- Edward Colmans in Raiders of Old California
- Born: Adolf Eduard Colmans; August 31, 1908; London, England
- Died: May 25, 1977 (aged 68); Los Angeles, California, US
- Occupation: Actor

Edward Colmans (August 31, 1908 – May 25, 1977) was a Dutch American actor.

== Early life ==
Colmans was born on August 31, 1908. Born Adolph Edward Colmans in London, England, he was the son of Louis Colmans (1883-1964), a Dutch violinist who had acquired United States citizenship through naturalization in 1921. His mother, Leah Colmans (1881-1955), was also Dutch.

== Career ==
In the 1930s and 1940s, Colmans worked as a radio announcer for the Arizona Broadcasting Company. In 1955 he appeared as Carlos on the TV western Cheyenne in the episode "Border Showdown." In 1960 Colmans appeared as Father Miguel on Cheyenne in the episode "Counterfeit Gun." He also appeared as Captain Andrea Dorea in the first season of Night Gallery in 1971 and in season four of Columbo as a minister.

== Selected filmography ==
- My Dream Is Yours (1949) - Radio Voice (voice, uncredited)
- Sirocco (1951) - Col. Corville (uncredited)
- The Magic Carpet (1951) - Caliph Ali's Wine Steward (uncredited)
- Viva Zapata! (1952) - Secretary (uncredited)
- Thief of Damascus (1952) - Sultan Raudah
- California Conquest (1952) - Juan Junipero
- The Snows of Kilimanjaro (1952) - Clerk (uncredited)
- The Iron Mistress (1952) - Don Juan de Varamendi
- The Man Behind the Gun (1953) - Carillo (uncredited)
- Prince of Pirates (1953) - Spanish Admiral
- The War of the Worlds (1953) - Spanish Priest (uncredited)
- Latin Lovers (1953) - Doctor (uncredited)
- Mission Over Korea (1953) - Map Co-ordinates Officer (uncredited)
- Mexican Manhunt (1953) - Mexican Doctor (uncredited)
- Conquest of Cochise (1953) - Don Francisco de Cordova
- Jubilee Trail (1954) - Orosco Guest (uncredited)
- Phantom of the Rue Morgue (1954) - Well-Dressed Man in Coach (uncredited)
- Secret of the Incas (1954) - Col. Emilio Cardoza
- Interrupted Melody (1955) - Italian Man (uncredited)
- Santa Fe Passage (1955) - Padre (uncredited)
- The Sea Chase (1955) - Hotel Manager (uncredited)
- The Last Command (1955) - Scout Seguin (uncredited)
- Love Is a Many-Splendored Thing (1955) - Dining Room Captain (uncredited)
- Headline Hunters (1955) - Rafael Garcia
- The Lone Ranger (1956) - The Padre (uncredited)
- Santiago (1956) - Lorenzo (uncredited)
- Istanbul (1957) - Hotel Clerk (uncredited)
- The Badge of Marshal Brennan (1957) - Governor Ainley
- Hell on Devil's Island (1957) - Jean Robert
- Raiders of Old California (1957) - Diego (uncredited)
- Darby's Rangers (1958) - Italian Doctor (uncredited)
- Colgate Theatre (1958) – Captain Molina in S1:E3, "Tonight in Havana"
- The Gun Runners (1958) - Juan
- Curse of the Undead (1959) - Don Miguel Robles (uncredited)
- The Miracle (1959) - Priest Blessing Animals (uncredited)
- The 3rd Voice (1960) - Carreras
- Rawhide (1961) – Padre in S4:E2, "The Sendoff"
- Four Horsemen of the Apocalypse (1962) - Minor Role (uncredited)
- Two Weeks in Another Town (1962) - Tucino's Henchman (uncredited)
- Diary of a Madman (1963) - Andre D'Arville
- Fun in Acapulco (1963) - Mr. Delgado, Manager of the Ambassado Club (uncredited)
- Arrest and Trial (1963-1964, TV Series) - Judge / Magistrate
- A Global Affair (1964) - Party Guest (uncredited)
- Hellfighters (1968) - Senor Caldez (uncredited)
- The Wild Wild West (1969, TV Series) - Juan Ramirez
- The High Chaparral (1970, TV Series) - Julio Sanchez
- Adam-12 (1974, TV Series, S6-Ep15) - Dr Eliot
