= Buffalo gun =

Buffalo gun may refer to:

- A rifle used for hunting American buffalo (bison)
  - Hawken rifle, a muzzle-loading rifle from the earlier period of American western expansion
  - Buffalo rifle, a later, often breechloading cartridge rifle during the period of commercial buffalo hunting
- A rifle used for hunting African Cape buffalo
  - Heavy calibre bolt action rifle
  - Heavy calibre double rifle
- Buffalo Gun (film), a 1961 American western film
