= No Place to Land =

No Place to Land may refer to:

- No Place to Land (album), 2004 album by New Zealand singer Michael Murphy
- No Place to Land (film), 1958 American drama film directed by Albert C. Gannaway
