= Hidden Guns =

1956 movie

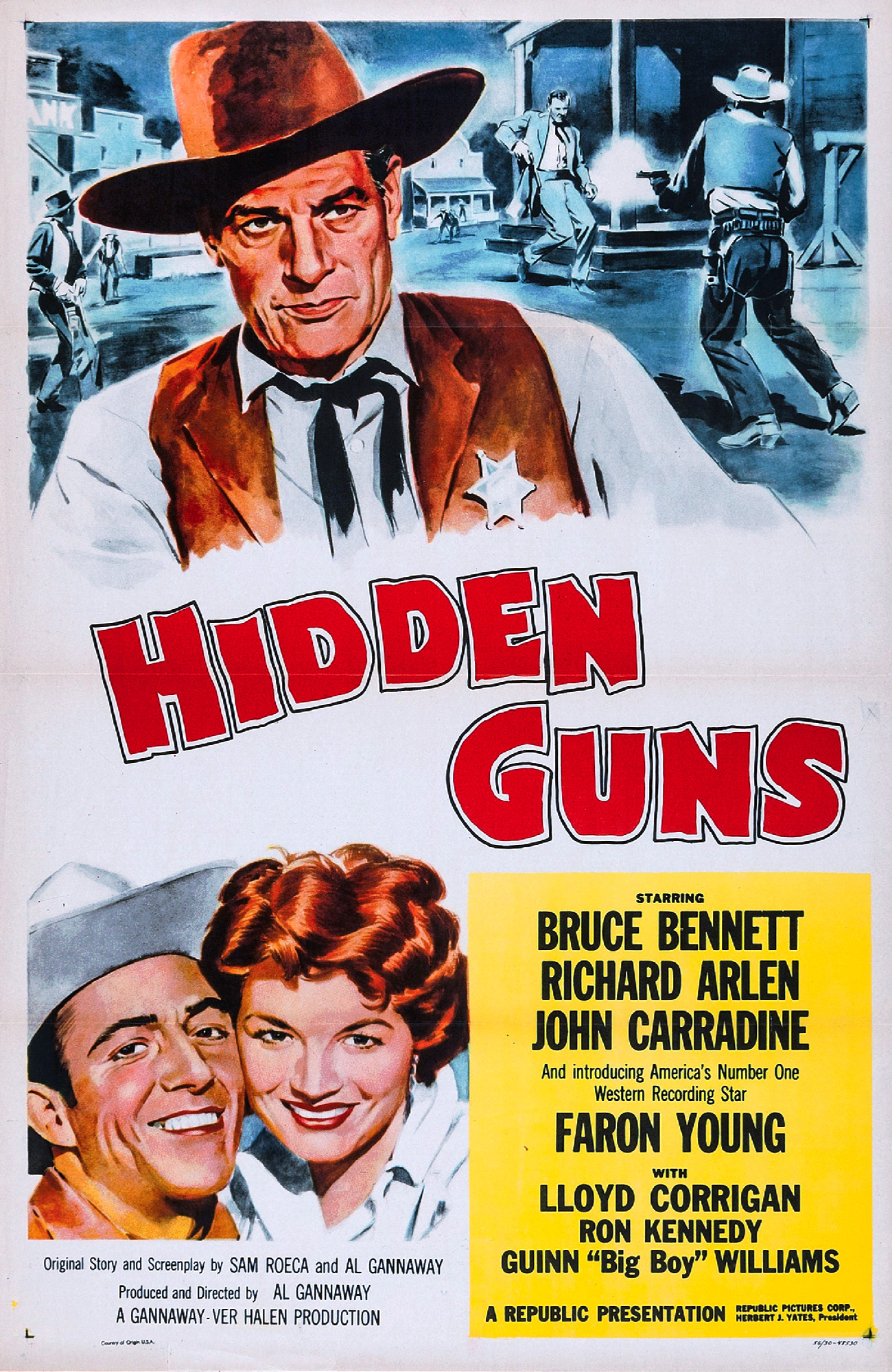
- Theatrical release poster
- Directed by: Albert C. Gannaway
- Screenplay by: Samuel Roeca; Albert C. Gannaway
- Story by: Samuel Roeca; Albert C. Gannaway
- Produced by: Albert C. Gannaway
- Starring: Bruce Bennett; Richard Arlen; John Carradine; Faron Young; Lloyd Corrigan; Angie Dickinson
- Cinematography: Clark Ramsey
- Edited by: Leon Barsha
- Music by: Ramey Idriss
- Production company: Republic Pictures
- Distributed by: Republic Pictures
- Release date: January 30, 1956
- Running time: 66 minutes
- Country: United States
- Language: English

Hidden Guns is a 1956 American Western film directed by Albert C. Gannaway and written by Samuel Roeca and Albert C. Gannaway. The film stars Bruce Bennett, Richard Arlen, John Carradine, Faron Young, Lloyd Corrigan and Angie Dickinson. The film was released on January 30, 1956, by Republic Pictures.

== Plot ==
An entire town is afraid of a man called Stragg, a wealthy and ruthless saloon owner who employs hired guns and has cheated many of the citizens out of their money and land. The only man who stands up to Stragg is the popular sheriff, Ward Young, but no one, including Ward's son, deputy Faron, is willing to side with him against the powerful Stragg.

When a law is changed that will strip Ward of his authority within 48 hours, he becomes determined to put Stragg behind bars as his last act. He seeks out Burt Miller, brother of a man Stragg has had murdered. On a stagecoach ride with Miller, his witness, accompanied by Doc Carter's beautiful daughter, Becky, another passenger listens to their conversation. He is a gunslinger named Snipe Harding, who has been hired by Stragg to kill the sheriff and the witness.

Snipe recognizes that killing Ward will be difficult, knowing him to be a fast draw. After he kills Miller, he persuades Stragg to challenge the sheriff to a showdown in front of everyone in town. When the men draw, Snipe shoots the sheriff from a hiding place. Doc Carter and others can only conclude that Ward was shot in a fair fight.

Faron, however, is suspicious, and Doc's examination proves that the sheriff was shot with a rifle, not a pistol. He goes gunning for Snipe, killing him, and the townspeople come to his aid when Stragg attempts to flee.

== Cast ==
- Bruce Bennett as Stragg
- Richard Arlen as Sheriff Ward Young
- John Carradine as Snipe Harding
- Faron Young as Deputy Faron Young
- Lloyd Corrigan as Judge Wallis
- Angie Dickinson as Becky Carter
- Damian O'Flynn as Kingsley
- Irving Bacon as Doc Carter
- Tom Hubbard as Grundy
- Ron Gans as Burt Miller
- Bill Ward as Joe Miller
- Lee Morgan as Emmett Harding
- Edmund Cobb as Ben Williams
- Ben Welden as Ben Peabody
- Guinn "Big Boy" Williams as Kingford
- Gordon Terry as Terry
- Charles Heard as Stage Stop Attendant
- Bill Coontz as Dave
- Michael Darrin as Hank
