= Daniel Boone, Trail Blazer =

1956 film by Ismael Rodríguez

- Original film poster
- Directed by: Albert C. Gannaway; Ismael Rodríguez
- Screenplay by: Tom Hubbard; John Patrick
- Produced by: Ben Costanten; Albert C. Gannaway; C.J. Ver Halen Jr.
- Starring: Bruce Bennett; Lon Chaney Jr.; Faron Young
- Cinematography: Jack Draper
- Edited by: Fernando Martínez
- Music by: Raúl Lavista
- Production company: Albert C. Gannaway Productions
- Distributed by: Republic Pictures
- Release date: October 5, 1956 (United States)
- Running time: 76 minutes
- Country: United States
- Language: English

Daniel Boone, Trail Blazer is a 1956 American historical western adventure film co-produced and directed by Albert C. Gannaway and Ismael Rodríguez and starring Bruce Bennett, Lon Chaney Jr. and Faron Young. The film was shot in Trucolor in Mexico. It was released by Republic Pictures at the height of the Davy Crockett, King of the Wild Frontier craze.

== Plot ==
Set in 1775, during the American War of Independence, the settlement of Boonesborough, Kentucky, is besieged by both hostile Shawnee Indian tribes and the British. Frontiersman Daniel Boone and his family must fight for survival when overtures of peace fail and culminate in a frontal assault on the fort.

== Cast ==
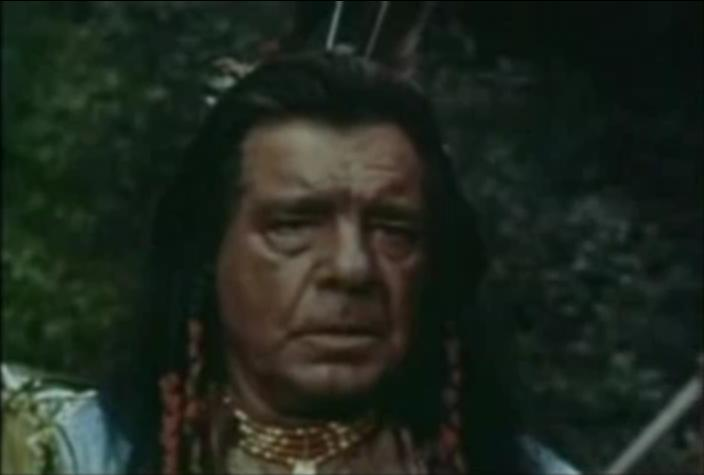
Lon Chaney Jr. as Blackfish

- Bruce Bennett as Daniel Boone
- Lon Chaney Jr. as Blackfish
- Faron Young as Faron Callaway
- Kem Dibbs as Simon Girty
- Damian O'Flynn as Andy Callaway
- Jacqueline Evans as Rebecca Boone
- Nancy Rodman as Susannah Boone
- Freddy Fernández as Israel Boone
- Carol Kelly as Jamima Boone
- Eduardo Noriega as Squire Boone
- Fred Kohler Jr. as Kenton
- Gordon Mills as John Holder
- Claudio Brook as James Boone
- Joe Ainley as Gen. Hamilton
- Lee Morgan as Smitty

== Soundtrack ==
Albert C. Gannaway composed the music for three songs for the film, with lyrics by Hal Levy.

- "Long Green Valley" (sung by Faron Young)
- "Stand Firm in the Faith"
- "Dan'l Boone"

== See also ==
- List of films about the American Revolution
- List of films in the public domain in the United States
