= Fiend of Dope Island =

- Original film poster
- Directed by: Nate Watt
- Written by: Bruce Bennett; Mark Carabel; Nate Watt (story)
- Produced by: J. Harold Odell; David Odell
- Starring: Bruce Bennett; Robert Bray; Tania Velia
- Cinematography: Gayne Rescher
- Music by: "Forever Hold Me" music and lyrics by Ken Darby
- Distributed by: Essanay Films
- Release date: January 1961
- Running time: 76 min.
- Country: United States
- Language: English

Fiend of Dope Island, also released as Whiplash, was a lurid men's adventure type motion picture filmed in 1959 and released in 1961. The picture starred and was co-written by Bruce Bennett and was the final film directed by Nate Watt. It was filmed in Puerto Rico where producer J. Harold Odell had previously filmed his Machete (1958) and Counterplot (1959). Several scenes were censored for the United States release. The film co-stars Tania Velia, billed as the "Yugoslavian Bombshell" who had appeared in the July 1959 Playboy, and Puerto Rican actor Miguel Ángel Álvarez.

== Plot ==
Charlie Davis runs his own island in the Caribbean with a literal whip hand. He makes his income as a marijuana grower, exporter and gunrunner. He hires a female entertainer to amuse the clients of his cantina and himself.

Charlie's world begins to fall apart because one of his employees is an undercover narcotics investigator. His troubles escalate to a full-scale native rebellion and end with a fatal shark attack.

== Legacy ==
The Cramps named their 2002 record album Fiends of Dope Island after the film.

== Cast ==
- Bruce Bennett as Charlie Davis
- Robert Bray as David
- Tania Velia as Glory La Verne
- Ralph A. Rodriguez as Naru
- Miguel Ángel Álvarez as Capt. Fred
