= Buffalo Gun (film) =

- Theatrical release poster
- Directed by: Albert C. Gannaway
- Written by: A. R. Milton
- Produced by: A. R. Milton
- Starring: Marty Robbins, Webb Pierce, Carl Smith, Mary Ellen Kay
- Cinematography: Perry Finnerman
- Edited by: Carl Pingitore
- Music by: Roy C. Bennett, Sonny Curtis, Ralph Freed, Al Hoffman, Ramez Idriss
- Production company: Albert C. Gannaway Productions
- Distributed by: Globe Pictures
- Release date: 23 May 1961
- Running time: minutes
- Country: United States
- Language: English

Buffalo Gun is a 1961 American Western film directed by Albert C. Gannaway and starring Marty Robbins, Webb Pierce, Carl Smith, Mary Ellen Kay. The film was shot in 1957 in Ray Corrigan Ranch, California and released in 1961.

== Plot ==
Marty Robbins, Webb Pierce, and Carl Smith are lawmen who are fighting the men who are stealing government supplies meant for Native Americans. The starving Natives are on the verge of going to war over their treatment.

== Cast ==
- Webb Pierce as Webb Pierce
- Carl Smith as Carl Smith
- Marty Robbins as Marty Robbins
- Wayne Morris as Roche
- Don "Red" Barry as Murdock
- Mary Ellen Kay as Clementine Hubbard
- Douglas Fowley as Sheriff
- Harry Lauter as Vin
- Eddie Crandall as Eddie Hubbard
- Gordon Stoker as 1st Tenor Member of the Jordanaires (as The Jordanaires)
- Bill Coontz as Cocha
- Neal Matthews Jr. as 2nd Tenor Member of the Jordanaires (as The Jordanaires)
- Hoyt Hawkins as Baritone Member of the Jordanaires (as The Jordanaires)
- Eddie Little Sky as Sartu (as Eddie Little)
- Hugh Jarrett as Bass Member of the Jordanaires (as The Jordanaires)
- Charles Soldani as Chief
