= Million Dollar Racket =

1937 film

- Directed by: Robert F. Hill
- Written by: Basil Dickey
- Produced by: Sam Katzman
- Starring: Bruce Bennett; Joan Barclay; Bryant Washburn
- Cinematography: William Hyer
- Edited by: Holbrook N. Todd
- Production company: Victory Pictures
- Distributed by: Victory Pictures
- Release date: October 1, 1937
- Running time: 66 minutes
- Country: United States
- Language: English

Million Dollar Racket is a 1937 American crime film directed by Robert F. Hill and starring Bruce Bennett, Joan Barclay and Bryant Washburn.

== Cast ==
- Bruce Bennett as Lawrence 'Larry' Duane
- Joan Barclay as Molly Henessey
- Bryant Washburn as Herbert Marvin
- Vane Calvert as Mrs. Henessey
- Samuel Adams as Tim Henessey
- Jimmy Aubrey as Melton
- Dave O'Brien as Johnny Henessey
- Monte Carter as Lefty
- Frank Wayne as Eddie
- Bob Terry as Luke
- Lynn Arden as Nan

== Bibliography ==
- Pitts, Michael R. Poverty Row Studios, 1929–1940: An Illustrated History of 55 Independent Film Companies, with a Filmography for Each. McFarland & Company, 2005.
