= Plunderers of Painted Flats =

1959 movie

- Theatrical release poster
- Directed by: Albert C. Gannaway
- Screenplay by: John Greene; Phil Shuken
- Produced by: Albert C. Gannaway
- Starring: Corinne Calvet; John Carroll; Skip Homeier; George Macready; Edmund Lowe; Bea Benaderet
- Cinematography: John M. Nickolaus, Jr.
- Edited by: Asa Boyd Clark
- Music by: Alex Compinsky
- Production company: Albert C. Gannaway Productions
- Distributed by: Republic Pictures
- Release date: January 23, 1959
- Running time: 77 minutes
- Country: United States
- Language: English

Plunderers of Painted Flats is a 1959 American Western film, shot in Naturama, and was directed by Albert C. Gannaway and written by John Greene and Phil Shuken. The film stars Corinne Calvet, John Carroll, Skip Homeier, George Macready, Edmund Lowe and Bea Benaderet. The film was released on January 23, 1959, by Republic Pictures and was the last film that they had produced and released.

== Plot ==
Squatter Galt Martin's house is set on fire during the night by a couple of rancher Ed Sampson's men. When Galt's elder son Joe exits through the front door he is pistol-whipped which Galt's younger son, Timmy, sees through a window. When Galt comes out and finds Joe unconscious, he is shot in cold blood by one of the men, also witnessed by Timmy. Sampson then orders his men to leave. The next day, Timmy recognizes his father's killer, Cass, in town. Joe, who is unarmed, confronts Cass, who pulls a gun and says he would expect Joe to get a gun and go after his father's killer. When Joe says he wants a gun, Cass tells his fellow ranch hand Bart, to give Joe his, which he does. As they prepare to draw, elderly Ned East asks Cass if he wants to try an old man first. Cass agrees but Ned beats him to the draw and kills him. Sampson tells ranch hand Carl he already has a gunfighter coming to take care of Ned and then tells him to stop the mail-order brides that the squatters have ordered.

When Carl and two henchman hold up the stage with the brides, they are all killed by gunslinger Clint Jones who was also on the stage. While they wait for the stage's wheel to be fixed the three brides admit to each other that they lied, Ned East's Mary, and Andy Heather's Ella, about their age, Joe Martin's, Kathy, says her lie "is worse than that". Shortly after Clint tires to kiss Kathy which she resists at first, before giving in. When they arrive in town and meet their future husbands it turns out that both Ned and Andy lied about their age too. Andy and Ella are happy with each other as are Ned and Mary. Joe is smitten with Kathy, but she is a little hesitant. The triple wedding takes place later the same day. Clint attends and when it is over goes to the bar and eventually gets drunk. Joe takes Kathy home to the old Farraday place (they go scared and left after the Martin's place got burned down), which is on the corner of the Martin holding. Kathy tries to tell Joe the truth about herself, but he says he doesn't care.

The wives make supper with Mary's being perfect and Kathy's a disaster which makes her very upset, though Joe says he doesn't mind, but he will sleep in the barn. A drunk Clint breaks into a store and takes a hat, leaving behind payment, and rides off to find Kathy. He sees Kathy in bed and wakes her up to give her the hat. He asks her where her husband is, she says "in the barn". Clint starts to laugh then Joe enters and hits him. Clint pulls his gun, then starts laughing, puts his gun away and leaves, still laughing.

The next day Joe tells Ned that Clint is in town. Ned tells Joe they will practice target shooting that afternoon and go to town the next day to confront Clint and Sampson. When Kathy sees them practicing she says she is going to leave Joe. That night Ned goes into town alone. He confronts Clint and when they draw Clint wins and Ned is killed. Timmy, who watched the shootout, goes to fetch Joe. Clint tells Sampson that one day he will be like Ned, old and slow. Sampson gathers all his men in the saloon and tells them they are going to get rid of all the squatters, then buys them all drinks. Timmy tells Joe who says for Timmy and Kathy to tell all the squatters to send the men to him and the women and children to the church. Joe and the squatters surround the saloon. Bart and another of Sampson's men, Bill, are burying Ned in the graveyard, when they see the women and children arrive at the church they head for the saloon. Just as Sampson and his men are about to leave the saloon, Joe and a few others enter through an upstairs door and order them to put their guns on the table. From the front door Bart shoots out the lamp and everyone starts firing. Sampson and Clint escape in the confusion.

The shootout spreads to the street and Bill is killed. Sampson, Clint and Bart head for the church. Mary goes out to confront them with a rifle. As they approach she shoots Bart and is then shot by Sampson. Sampson and Clint enter the church and hold everyone at gunpoint, except for Ella who finds Mary dead and rushes to tell Joe and Andy and the squatters when they arrive. Sampson grabs a hostage and takes her outside to face the squatters. He demands two fresh horses and threatens to start shooting hostages if they are not brought. The hostage's husband charges at Sampson who shoots him. His wife faints. Joe says to bring the horses. Sampson tells them to drop their guns and go around behind the church, which they do. Sampson says they will be taking hostages with them. He goes inside and says he will take Kathy and for Clint to take Timmy. When they get outside Sampson prepares to shoot Kathy but Clint kills him. Joe appears and Clint puts his gun away then he Clint fight. Clint takes out his gun and is about to shoot Joe when Timmy shoots him.

== Cast ==
- Corinne Calvet as Kathy Martin
- John Carroll as Clint Jones
- Skip Homeier as Joe Martin
- George Macready as Ed Sampson
- Edmund Lowe as Ned East
- Bea Benaderet as Ella Heather
- Madge Kennedy as Mary East
- Joe Besser as Andy Heather
- Allan Lurie as Cass Becker
- Candy Candido as Bartender
- Herb Vigran as Mr. Perry
- Burt Topper as Bart
