= Cafe Hostess =

1940 film by Sidney Salkow

- Theatrical poster for the film
- Directed by: Sidney Salkow
- Screenplay by: Harold Shumate
- Story by: Tay Garnett; Howard Higgin
- Produced by: Jack Fier
- Starring: Preston Foster; Ann Dvorak
- Cinematography: Benjamin Kline
- Edited by: Al Clark
- Production company: Columbia Pictures
- Distributed by: Columbia Pictures
- Release dates: January 6, 1940 (New York); January 26, 1940 (Los Angeles)
- Running time: 63 minutes
- Country: United States
- Language: English

Cafe Hostess (also known as Street of Missing Women) is a 1940 American crime film directed by Sidney Salkow and starring Preston Foster and Ann Dvorak. The screenplay was written by Harold Shumate, based on a story by Tay Garnett and Howard Higgin. Prior to filming the studio had been warned by the MPAA that the film did not comply with its code, but it is unclear whether changes were made to the script.

== Plot ==
Jo is a hostess, also known as a "B" girl (a euphemism for a prostitute), in a clip joint, a seedy waterfront nightclub where the patrons are set up for a pickpocket operation. The club is owned by Eddie Morgan, who keeps an eye on things by posing as the piano player. A former hostess, Annie, returns to the club in order to tell Morgan off and let him know that he ruined her life. Not getting satisfaction, she attempts to get Jo to turn witness against Morgan in order to get him arrested, but Jo is too afraid. While there, Annie witnesses Jo being treated roughly by a local hood, Red Connolly (William Pawley), whom she accosts, which turns into a brawl.

Dan Walters, a sailor, and two friends show up at the club, and Jo begins to flirt with him. Finding that she likes him, she does not want to follow her usual routine of getting him drunk and taking his wallet, but Morgan insists. However, she is clumsy in her attempt, and is thwarted by Walters, who leaves, disillusioned with Jo, whom he was beginning to like. Jo realizes that she would like to get out of her occupation, but Annie's failure to start a new life after leaving makes her unsure. Morgan is furious that she failed to lift the wallet, and slaps her around, leaving her bruised. When Walters returns to the club later, he notices the bruises and in an effort to get Jo out of the situation, offers to marry her and move away with her.

To assist in his plan to rescue Jo, Walters begins to snoop around in order to get dirt on Morgan. He uncovers quite a bit of illegal activity, and approaches Steve Mason, an undercover detective, with the information. Morgan learns from Nellie, the owner of another local establishment, of Walters' plan to take Jo away, and also discovers that Walters has spoken to Mason. He attempts to do away with Walters; the result is an all-out brawl, during which Morgan himself is knifed to death. Annie confesses to stabbing Morgan and gives herself up to Mason, who takes her away.

== Cast ==
- Preston Foster as Dan Walters
- Ann Dvorak as Jo
- Douglas Fowley as Eddie Morgan
- Wynne Gibson as Annie
- Arthur Loft as Steve Mason
- Bruce Bennett as Budge
- Eddie Acuff as Scotty
- Bradley Page as Al
- Linda Winters as Tricks
- Beatrice Blinn as Daisy
- Dick Wessel as Willie
- Peggy Shannon as Nellie

== Production ==
Before filming began, the Production Code Administration (PCA) of the MPAA issued a complaint to Columbia that the script was in violation of the Production Code for its "general sordid, low-toned background and flavor" and the fact that the characters of Dan and Annie are criminals who do not face punishment. The PCA made several suggestions to Columbia head Harry Cohn about changes that should be made, although it is unclear whether these changes were implemented in the script.

The film began production in the last week of September 1939. Members of the cast announced at that time included Ann Dvorak, Preston Foster, Arthur Loft, Wynne Gibson, Betty Compson and Peggy Shannon. Compson, Gibson and Shannon had been stars during the silent era, and were now cast as "B" girls in the film. Filming wrapped during the week of October 24. On October 25, Variety released the names of several additional cast members: Bruce Bennett, Don Beddoe, Douglas Fowley, Lorna Gray, Linda Winters and Beatrice Blinn. This was Bennett's first film under this stage name; he had previously been billed as Herman Brix.

The film was originally titled Street of Missing Women, but on October 31, 1939, Columbia announced that it would retitle the film Cafe Hostess. However, when the film premiered nationwide in January 1940, it was billed as Street of Missing Women in many cities, including New York. The Cafe Hostess title was used in Los Angeles, where the film premiered on January 26 as the second feature to His Girl Friday at the Hollywood Pantages Theatre.

The Legion of Decency assigned the film an "A-2" classification, meaning it was only suitable for adult audiences. A title card at the beginning of the film reads: "B-Girls..... Bar Girls..... Cafe Hostesses..... Products of a man-made system, these girls whose stock in a trade is a tireless smile, a sympathetic ear and a shoddy evening gown, they prey on the very men who made them what they are. The Cafe Hostess knows only one law..... A LADY MUST LIVE!" Censorship boards in at least two towns in Alberta and Pennsylvania required the removal of the title card.

== Reception ==
In a contemporary review for The New York Times, critic B. R. Crisler wrote: "The best that can be said ... is that nothing is missing—including the customary barroom brawl."

Motion Picture Daily gave the film a lukewarm review, calling it a "routine melodrama", although the reviewer did praise the efforts of the cast. The Motion Picture Herald gave the film a more positive review, although the reviewer felt the story was "unexciting". He noted "occasional outstanding melodramatic moments" and complimented the acting of the entire cast and especially Salkow's direction, stating that his deft pacing sustained the film despite the flawed story.
