= The Maverick Queen =

1956 film

- Theatrical release poster
- Directed by: Joseph Kane
- Written by: Kenneth Gamet; DeVallon Scott
- Based on: The Maverick Queen by Zane Grey
- Produced by: Herbert J. Yates
- Starring: Barbara Stanwyck; Barry Sullivan
- Cinematography: Jack A. Marta
- Edited by: Richard L. Van Enger
- Music by: Victor Young
- Color process: Trucolor
- Production company: Republic Pictures
- Distributed by: Republic Pictures
- Release date: April 4, 1956
- Running time: 90 minutes
- Country: United States
- Language: English

The Maverick Queen is a 1956 American Western and starring Barbara Stanwyck as the titular character and Barry Sullivan as an undercover Pinkerton detective out to stop outlaws Butch Cassidy, the Sundance Kid, and the Wild Bunch. It was the first film made in Republic's widescreen process Naturama. The film is based on the novel of the same name by Zane Grey.

== Plot ==
A stranger, calling himself Jeff Young, imposes on rancher Lucy Lee for a meal and a night's rest, then saves her from being robbed. Jeff helps deliver her cattle to town, where he encounters Kit Banion running her saloon, The Maverick Queen.

Kit is secretly in cahoots with the notorious Hole in the Wall Gang, led by Butch Cassidy and Sundance, and a jealous Sundance is angered when Jeff beats him at poker and attracts romantic interest from Kit, who offers Jeff a job as a faro dealer. He reveals he is actually Jeff Younger, a relative of the Younger Gang outlaws, and wants to help Kit and her associates with their illegal holdups.

Lucy is held captive by Sundance after a train robbery, and Jeff ends up killing him to save her. Holding off the other outlaws while their cabin is on fire, Jeff is helped by Kit, who is shot and dies in his arms. The posse arrives, whereupon Jeff confesses that he is actually a Pinkerton detective, working undercover to catch the thieves.

== Cast ==
- Barbara Stanwyck as Kit Banion
- Barry Sullivan as Jeff Young / Younger
- Scott Brady as Sundance
- Mary Murphy as Lucy Lee
- Wallace Ford as Jamie
- Howard Petrie as Butch Cassidy
- Jim Davis as The Stranger, the real Jeff Younger
- Emile Meyer as Leo Malone
- Walter Sande as Sheriff Wilson
- George Keymas as Muncie
- John Doucette as Loudmouth
- Taylor Holmes as Pete Callaher
- Pierre Watkin as McMillan
- Joni James as Title Song Singer

== Reception ==
The New York Times wrote: "'The Maverick Queen' shows also that Republic, too, has recognized the growth of the screen—sideways. For the film is an old horse opera in still another technological dress." In 2012, Dennis Schwartz gave a rating of B and said: "The scenery is stunning, Stanwyck's performance is fiery and the pic is good enough to be a fair period piece and an entertaining watch." Turner Classic Movies wrote: "Whatever the film's shortcomings, a bravura performance by Stanwyck combined with the location shooting near Silverton, Colorado [..] make The Maverick Queen worthwhile viewing."

== See also ==
- List of American films of 1956
