= The Badge of Marshal Brennan =

- Theatrical release poster
- Directed by: Albert C. Gannaway
- Screenplay by: Tom Hubbard
- Produced by: Albert C. Gannaway
- Starring: Jim Davis; Arleen Whelan; Carl Smith; Harry Lauter; Marty Robbins; Douglas Fowley; Lee Van Cleef; Louis Jean Heydt
- Cinematography: Charles Straumer
- Edited by: Warren Adams
- Music by: Ramey Idriss
- Production company: Albert C. Gannaway Productions
- Distributed by: Allied Artists Pictures
- Release date: April 14, 1957
- Running time: 76 minutes
- Country: United States
- Language: English

The Badge of Marshal Brennan is a 1957 American Western film directed by Albert C. Gannaway and written by Tom Hubbard. The film stars Jim Davis, Arleen Whelan, Carl Smith, Harry Lauter, Marty Robbins, Douglas Fowley, Lee Van Cleef and Louis Jean Heydt. The film was released on April 14, 1957, by Allied Artists Pictures.

== Plot ==
When a gun-toting drifter known as the Stranger (Jim Davis) comes across a dying marshal, he decides to take up the identity of the late lawman. Settling down in a small town, the Stranger uses his new-found authority to challenge Shad Donaphin (Lee Van Cleef), the violent and unruly son of a shady cattle baron. Intent on staying true to his adopted persona, the Stranger even strikes up a relationship with Murdock (Arleen Whelan), a beautiful local lady.

== Cast ==
- Jim Davis as 'Brennan'
- Arleen Whelan as Murdock
- Carl Smith as Sheriff Carl Smith
- Harry Lauter as Doc Hale
- Marty Robbins as Felipe
- Douglas Fowley as Marshal Matt Brennan
- Lee Van Cleef as Shad Donaphin
- Louis Jean Heydt as Col. Donaphin
- Lawrence Dobkin as Chicamon
- Eddie Crandall as Pepe Joe
- Darryl Guy as George
- Rick Vallin as Jody
- Edward Colmans as Governor Ainley

== Production ==
Parts of the film were shot in Kanab Canyon and Johnson Canyon in Utah.
