= Dragonfly Squadron =

1954 film by Lesley Selander

- Original theatrical film poster
- Directed by: Lesley Selander
- Written by: John C. Champion
- Produced by: John C. Champion
- Starring: John Hodiak; Barbara Britton; Bruce Bennett
- Cinematography: Harry Neumann
- Edited by: Walter Hannemann
- Music by: Paul Dunlap
- Production company: Allied Artists Pictures
- Distributed by: Allied Artists Pictures
- Release date: January 27, 1954
- Running time: 83 minutes
- Country: United States
- Language: English
- Budget: $300,000
- Box office: $700,000

Dragonfly Squadron is a 1954 American war film directed by Lesley Selander and starring John Hodiak, Barbara Britton and Bruce Bennett. The film is set in the period shortly before and during the invasion of South Korea by North Korean troops.

Dragonfly Squadron was originally intended to be released as a 3D film, and therefore was filmed in dual 35mm Polaroid 3-D. Interest in 3D films, however, greatly diminished towards the end of 1953, so when the film premiered in Los Angeles on January 27, 1954, and went on general release on March 21, 1954, only flat prints were shown.

== Plot ==
In May 1950, Major Matt Brady (John Hodiak) is redeployed to Busan, South Korea. His mission there is to train South Korean pilots in the defensive struggle. Also, there are air support exercises in case the Americans need to be evacuated. Colonel Schuller (Richard Simmons) sends Brady and Captain MacIntyre (Gerald Mohr) to the airbase in Gwangju. The American instructors only have 25 days left to introduce the South Korean pilots to U.S. training and tactics.

At the base, Brady meets Donna Cottrell (Barbara Britton), his former fiancé. Her husband, Red Cross physician Dr. Stephen Cottrell (Bruce Bennett), is said to have been killed in action. When Donna finds out that he is actually alive - he had been captured, but was able to escape - she returns to him. She tells Matt that Stephen cannot work as a surgeon any more, as his hands were badly injured during enemy torture. She is intent on doing the right thing, but feels torn between the two men.

The training of the South Korean pilots makes progress, which is carefully noted by Dixon (Jess Barker), a reporter. Captain Veddors (Harry Lauter) tells him that Matt does not fly any more because he once caused a fatal crash with a test pilot. Matt receives an encrypted message announcing a serious enemy attack. MacIntyre informs Matt that Lieutenant Kim-Sun is not able to fly due to the illness of his sister, but Matt needs every man. Kim-Sun dies in the crash of his aircraft and, as a consequence, the pilots blame Matt. MacIntyre suspects that Kim-Sun's aircraft was sabotaged.

Colonel Schuller orders the evacuation of all Americans and gives Matt the order to release the South Korean pilots into active service. Stephen stays behind in Gwangju to carry on his work, while Donna leaves the base in a convoy. The convoy is attacked by two tanks. Colonel Conners cautions Matt that air support for the convoy is out of the question but, by sanction of the United Nations, intervention by U.S. infantrymen is possible. Matt stays behind on the base with Veddors and MacIntyre.

Soon the news of the invasion of South Korea arrives. Captain Warnowski and his infantry battalion reach Gwagju. Due to heavy tank assaults, of the original complement of 400 men, only 30 remain. The infantry find Captain Wyler (Adam Williams), who was driving the truck Donna was in. Before he dies of his wounds, he tells Matt that Donna has successful escaped. As the attacks intensify, North Korean aircraft damage the airfield, subsequently, Matt and Warnowski decide to retreat. The South Koreans identify an old woman as a spy, who has been transmitting information about the base to the enemy by radio, and execute her.

Matt and his remaining troops come under heavy fire with Matt being wounded and Veddors killed. In Chungtu village, they reach a Red Cross hospital, and soon Donna too arrives there. There she hears that Stephen was killed during the fighting. The enemy tanks thrust forward and force the survivors to retreat further. When U.S. aircraft attack and stop the tanks, Matt, Donna and the rest of the convoy escape.

== Cast ==
- John Hodiak as Major Mathew Brady
- Barbara Britton as Donna Cottrell
- Bruce Bennett as Dr. Stephen Cottrell
- Jess Barker as Dixon
- Gerald Mohr as Captain MacIntyre
- Chuck Connors as Captain Warnowski
- Harry Lauter as Captain Veddors
- Pamela Duncan as Anne Taylor
- Adam Williams as Captain Wyler
- John Lupton as Captain Woody Taylor
- Benson Fong as Captain Liehtse
- Richard Simmons as Colonel Wolf Schuller
- John Hedloe as Captain Wycoff
- Frank Ferguson as Colonel Conners
- Fess Parker as Flight instructor
- James Hong as South Korean Pilot Trainee (uncredited)

== Production ==
Hodiak was cast to play the protagonist due to his "manly voice" which director Lesley Selander thought sounded more "leaderly and American" than that of the other actors who were considered for the role. Production of Dragonfly Squadron began in mid-August 1953 with all scenes shot in California at Warner's Ranch near Warner Springs, Whiteman Air Park in Pacoima, and at the Iverson Movie Ranch near Chatsworth, Los Angeles. Prolific character actor James Hong made his film debut in Dragonfly Squadron in an uncredited role as a pilot trainee.

Dragonfly Squadron was made with the assistance of the U.S. military. The film's opening titles state: "We gratefully acknowledge the kind cooperation of the United States Department of Defense, the United States Air Force, and the United States Marine Corps in making possible the production of this picture... Dedicated to those American officers and men who served with, and so gallantly trained, the South Korean Army and Air Force."

Although a December 14, 1953 news item in Daily Variety reported that a 3D release of Dragonfly Squadron would be tested during four bookings in early 1954, it has not been established that the film played any 3D engagements. Its Los Angeles opening in January 1954 was in a "flat" version, as were all prints that went on general release in March 1954. The first public showing in 3D happened at the World 3D Film Expo III in September 2013, where a restored version was shown. A 3D Blu-ray of the film was released on October 14, 2014, offering both 3D and 2D versions of the restored film for home viewing.

The life story of the military consultant on the film, Colonel Dean Hess, was the subject of Battle Hymn (1957), directed by Douglas Sirk and starring Rock Hudson. The role that Colonel Hess played in training of the South Korean Air Force pilots was similar to that portrayed in Dragonfly Squadron.

=== Aircraft used ===
- Curtiss C-46 Commando
- Lockheed F-80 Shooting Star
- North American F-51 Mustang
- North American T-6 Texan
- Stinson L-5 Sentinel

== Reception ==
According to a note in The Hollywood Reporter in 1967, the Allied Artists production on Dragonfly Squadron cost $300,000 and grossed $700,000. Primarily a B film, although aerial scenes were notable, the film fell short in other aspects, receiving a "lukewarm reception from critics."

Both film historians Michael Paris in From the Wright Brothers to Top Gun: Aviation, Nationalism, and Popular Cinema (1995) and Stephen Pendo in Aviation in the Cinema (1985) noted Dragonfly Squadron was the least interesting of the two studio feature films that portrayed the training and operational exploits of Republic of Korea Air Force in the Korean War. Film historians Jack Hardwick and Ed Schnepf dismissed Dragonfly Squadron as "...pretty bad, don't bother with this one." They did recommend, however, the sequences with the Stinson L-5 liaison / observation / light aircraft featured in the film.
