= Maharlika (film) =

1987 war film commissioned by Ferdinand Marcos

- Directed by: Jerry Hopper
- Written by: Sy Salkowitz
- Starring: Paul Burke; Dovie Beams; Farley Granger
- Cinematography: Richard Kelly
- Production company: Nepomuceno Productions
- Release dates: February 20, 1987 (Rizal Theater); April 9, 1987
- Country: Philippines

Maharlika (lit. 'Nobleman'; also known as Guerilla Strike Force) is a 1987 Filipino war film directed by Jerry Hopper and starring Paul Burke, Dovie Beams, Farley Granger, Vic Diaz, Vic Silayan, and Broderick Crawford in his final film appearance. Produced by Nepomuceno Productions, it is loosely based on the alleged wartime exploits of Ferdinand Marcos, the 10th President of the Philippines, during World War II; the film was commissioned by Marcos himself in 1968. Though Maharlika was completed by 1970, the film was banned by Marcos' wife Imelda from theatrical exhibition in 1971 due to Beams alleging that she had an affair with the president. Imelda then instructed production head Luis Nepomuceno to safeguard the film's elements, which were thus sent abroad, while Nepomuceno Productions was later closed down.

After the Marcoses were deposed in 1986 through the People Power Revolution, the film was publicly exhibited for the first time at the Rizal Theater in Makati on February 20, 1987. Later, it was given a general release in Philippine theaters on April 9, 1987. Critic Ernie M. Hizon of the Manila Standard gave the film an extremely negative review for its unremarkable quality and white savior narrative.

== Cast ==
- Paul Burke as Bob Reynolds
- Dovie Beams as Isabella, a Filipina
- Farley Granger as Santos
- Vic Diaz
- Vic Silayan as Colonel Murai (Japanese: 陸軍大佐村井, Rikugun-Taisa Murai)
- Broderick Crawford as General Hadley
- Rosa Mia
- Dindo Fernando
- Romeo Rivera
- Ernesto La Guardia
- Vero Perfecto
- Ed Murphy
- Linda Martin

== Critical response ==
Ernie M. Hizon of the Manila Standard gave Maharlika an extremely negative review, calling it an "inert, grade D movie" that is "bereft of any aesthetic and historical value". Hizon was also critical of the casting of Dovie Beams, an American, in the role of an innocent native Filipina, while he considered the film's white savior narrative to be its worst issue. Hizon concluded that Maharlika is a cheap film that "peddles a gross distortion of our history."

== See also ==
- Whitewashing in film
