= No Place to Land (film) =

1958 film

- Theatrical release poster
- Directed by: Albert C. Gannaway
- Screenplay by: Vance Skarstedt
- Produced by: Albert C. Gannaway
- Starring: John Ireland; Mari Blanchard; Gail Russell; Jackie Coogan; Robert Middleton
- Cinematography: John M. Nickolaus, Jr.
- Edited by: Asa Clark
- Music by: Alec Compinsky
- Production company: Albert C. Gannaway Productions
- Distributed by: Republic Pictures
- Release date: October 3, 1958 (United States)
- Running time: 77 minutes
- Country: United States
- Language: English

No Place to Land is a 1958 American drama film directed by Albert C. Gannaway starring John Ireland, Mari Blanchard, Gail Russell, Jackie Coogan and Robert Middleton. Shot in Naturama, the film was released by Republic Pictures.

== Plot ==
A cropduster pilot finds himself caught between two women—one who loves him and the other, who doesn't handle rejection well, who's out to destroy him.

== Cast ==
- John Ireland as Jonas Bailey
- Mari Blanchard as Iris Lee LaVonne
- Gail Russell as Lynn Dillon
- Jackie Coogan as Swede
- Robert Middleton as Buck LaVonne
- Douglas Henderson as Roy Dillon
- Burt Topper as Miles Colby
- Bill Ward as Chick
- Whitey Hughes as Franklin
- Robert Griffin as Bart Pine
- William Peter Blatty as Policeman
- Johnny Carpenter as Lepley
- James Macklin as Dr. Christian Carter
- Bill Coontz as Bill
- Patrick Dennis-Leigh as Drunk
- Robert Hinkle as 'Big Jim'
