= Douglas Fowley =

American actor (1911–1998)

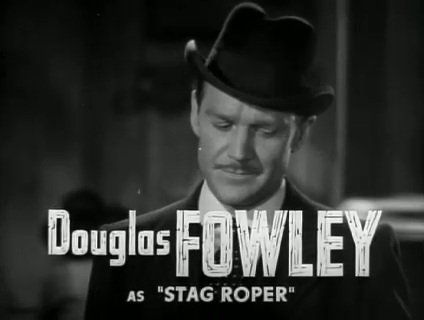
- Fowley in 20 Mule Team (1940)
- Born: Daniel Vincent Fowley; May 30, 1911; The Bronx, New York, U.S.
- Died: May 21, 1998 (aged 86); Los Angeles, California, U.S.
- Resting place: Murrieta, California, Laurel Cemetery
- Other name: Douglas V. Fowley
- Occupation: Actor
- Years active: 1933–1982
- Spouse: Jean Louise Paschall (m. 1961)
- Children: 6

Douglas Fowley (born Daniel Vincent Fowley, May 30, 1911 – May 21, 1998) was an American actor in more than 240 films and dozens of television programs. He is probably best remembered for his role as the frustrated movie director Roscoe Dexter in Singin' in the Rain (1952), and for his regular supporting role as Doc Fabrique and Doc Holliday in The Life and Legend of Wyatt Earp. He was the father of rock and roll musician and record producer Kim Fowley.

== Early years ==
Fowley was born in the Bronx in New York City. He attended Los Angeles City College.

Fowley began as a singing waiter and then worked as a copy boy for The New York Times, and a runner for a Wall Street broker,

== Military service ==
Fowley enlisted in the United States Navy during World War II; he served on an aircraft carrier in the Pacific Ocean. An explosion aboard knocked out his upper front teeth. Later he ended up portraying one of the best-known dentists in American history, "Doc" Fabrique and Doc Holiday, in the 1950s television show The Life and Legend of Wyatt Earp. "I started playing old character roles by removing my false upper plate, adding a beard, voice and gait to match my interpretation," he explained to Western Clippings in 1994.

== Film ==
After nightclub performing and stage work, Fowley appeared in 1933 in his first film, The Mad Game, alongside Spencer Tracy. Early in his acting career, he was usually cast as a movie heavy or gangster in B-movies, including Charlie Chan and Laurel and Hardy features.

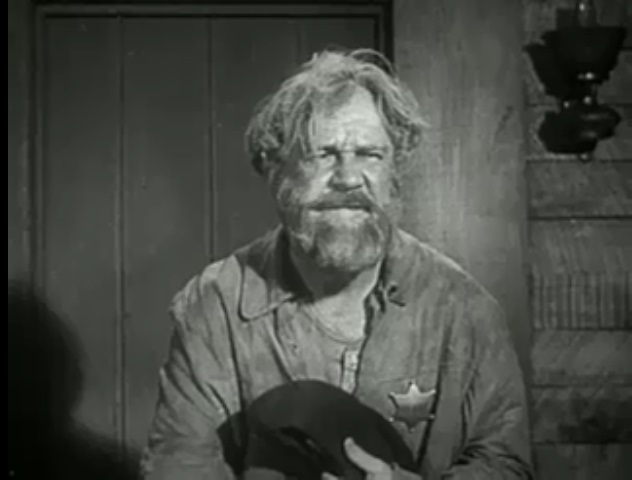
Douglas Fowley in Raiders of Old California (1957)

Fowley's films include Twenty Mule Team, Fall Guy, Mighty Joe Young, Angels in the Outfield, Battleground, Armored Car Robbery, Chick Carter, Detective, The Naked Jungle, The High and the Mighty, and Walking Tall.

== Television ==
=== Regular cast ===
For several seasons, Fowley played the key supporting role of John H. "Doc" Holliday in the 1955-1961 western television series The Life and Legend of Wyatt Earp after having appeared as Doc Fabrique in the show's premiere season. This role allowed Fowley to demonstrate his flair for comedy and other acting skills as a clever, sharp-witted, sardonic, cynical, alcoholic, poker-playing foil to the square-jawed, milk-drinking, church-going Wyatt Earp (Hugh O'Brian), nicknamed "Deacon" due to his rigid sense of morality. Not at all so encumbered Doc would occasionally take the law into his own hands behind Earp's back to protect his friend from legal action or even death when the marshal was legally or morally ham-strung. Fabrique, as played by Fowley, having no problem working around morals or the law, could be either hilarious or cold-blooded.

From 1966 to 1967, Fowley portrayed Andrew Hanks in Pistols 'n' Petticoats, a CBS sitcom. Hanks was the patriarch in a family of gun-toting women who seemed to have little need for male assistance.

Fowley portrayed retired businessman Robert Redford in Detective School (1979).

=== Guest appearances ===
In the 1950s, he appeared as himself on NBC's The Donald O'Connor Show. In 1954, he demonstrated his comic appeal when he appeared alongside Gracie Allen in The George Burns and Gracie Allen Show. He was cast in 1956 as Bob Egan in the "Two-Fisted Saint" episode of the religious anthology series Crossroads. He portrayed a con man in two episodes of the NBC sitcom It's a Great Life. He also guest-starred on Reed Hadley's CBS legal drama The Public Defender. He appeared, too, on the ABC situation comedy The Pride of the Family and on the NBC Western series The Californians and Jefferson Drum. He was cast on two Rod Cameron series, the syndicated City Detective and the Western-themed State Trooper, and in John Bromfield's series, U.S. Marshal. He guest-starred in the David Janssen crime drama Richard Diamond, Private Detective and guest-starred in season two, episode four of the Robert Culp Western Trackdown.

In 1959, Fowley appeared with Frank Ferguson in the episode "A Race for Life" of the CBS Western series The Texan, starring Rory Calhoun.

On December 30, 1963, Fowley guest-starred in an episode of The Andy Griffith Show, “Opie and his Merry Men”, as a hobo. Opie and his friends stole food from the “rich” and gave to the hobo, who quickly refused Andy’s help in finding a job.

In 1964, Fowley made a guest appearance on the CBS courtroom drama series Perry Mason playing agent Rubin Cason in "The Case of the Bountiful Beauty". In 1965, he was cast as Sorrowful in episode 83 of the series The Virginian.

In 1966, he appeared as "Rufus C. Hoops" in "The Search" season 2, episode 24, of the series "Daniel Boone". Original air date for this episode was March 3, 1966. In 1967, Fowley guest-starred on the short-lived CBS Western Dundee and the Culhane with John Mills.

In 1968, he appeared in episode 273 of My Three Sons as an old pal of Uncle Charley's. He had a role in the syndicated 1959-1960 Western Pony Express in the episode "Showdown at Thirty Mile Ridge". He was cast in 1963 in Miracle of the White Stallions.

In 1977, Fowley portrayed Dr. O. B. Mudd in the pilot episode of the NBC situation comedy Quark.

Fowley was usually typecast as a villain; when not playing an actual criminal, he often portrayed an argumentative troublemaker. Portraying a member of Tyrone Power's orchestra in Alexander's Ragtime Band, in the early scenes of the film, Fowley's character quarrels with his bandmates, but this is not developed in the film's later scenes.

Fowley continued to act into the 1970s and was frequently billed as "Douglas V. Fowley". One of his last roles was as Delaney Rafferty in Disney's The North Avenue Irregulars, in which he dressed in drag.

== Personal life ==
Fowley's wife at the time of his death was named Jean. His children were Douglas Jr., Kim, Daniel, Gretchen and Kip.

== Death ==
Fowley died on May 21, 1998, at the Motion Picture and Television Country House and Hospital in Woodland Hills, California, aged 86.

== Selected filmography ==
- The Woman Who Dared (1933) as Kay's Boyfriend
- The Mad Game (1933) as Gangster (uncredited)
- Sleepers East (1934) as Gangster (uncredited)
- I Hate Women (1934) as Nelson
- The Thin Man (1934) as Taxi Driver (uncredited)
- Let's Talk It Over (1934) as Sailor Jones
- Operator 13 (1934) as Union Officer (uncredited)
- Money Means Nothing (1934) as Red Miller (uncredited)
- The Girl from Missouri (1934) as New Bellboy with Vase (uncredited)
- Gift of Gab (1934) as Mac
- Student Tour (1934) as Mushy
- Night Life of the Gods (1935) as Cyril Sparks
- Transient Lady (1935) as Matt Baxter
- Straight from the Heart (1935) as Speed Spelvin
- Princess O'Hara (1935) as Emcee (uncredited)
- Old Man Rhythm (1935) as Oyster (uncredited)
- Two for Tonight (1935) as Pooch Donahue
- Miss Pacific Fleet (1935) as Second (scenes deleted)
- Ring Around the Moon (1936) as Ted Curlew
- Big Brown Eyes (1936) as Benny Battle
- Small Town Girl (1936) as Chick Page (uncredited)
- Mariners of the Sky (1936) as Lt. Steve Bassett
- Private Number (1936) as Sheik - Man Causing Brawl (uncredited)
- 36 Hours to Kill (1936) as Duke Benson
- Crash Donovan (1936) as Harris
- Sing, Baby, Sing (1936) as Mac
- Dimples (1936) as Stranger (uncredited)
- 15 Maiden Lane (1936) as Nick Shelby
- Woman-Wise (1937) as Stevens
- On the Avenue (1937) as Eddie Eads
- Time Out for Romance (1937) as Roy Webster
- This Is My Affair (1937) as Alec
- Fifty Roads to Town (1937) as Dutch Nelson
- She Had to Eat (1937) as Duke Stacey
- Wake Up and Live (1937) as Herman
- Wild and Woolly (1937) as Blackie Morgan
- One Mile from Heaven (1937) as Jim Tabor
- Charlie Chan on Broadway (1937) as Johnny Burke
- Love and Hisses (1937) as Mobster Webster
- City Girl (1938) as Ritchie
- Walking Down Broadway (1938) as Ace Wagner
- Mr. Moto's Gamble (1938) as Nick Crowder
- Alexander's Ragtime Band (1938) as Snapper
- Passport Husband (1938) as Tiger Martin
- Keep Smiling (1938) as Cedric Hunt
- Time Out for Murder (1938) as J.E. 'Dutch' Moran
- Submarine Patrol (1938) as Seaman Pinky Brett
- The Arizona Wildcat (1939) as Rufe Galloway
- Inside Story (1939) as Gus Brawley
- Dodge City (1939) as Munger
- Lucky Night (1939) as George
- Boy Friend (1939) as Ed Boyd
- It Could Happen to You (1939) as Freddie Barlow
- Charlie Chan at Treasure Island (1939) as Pete Lewis
- Henry Goes Arizona (1939) as Ricky Dole
- Slightly Honorable (1939) as Madder
- Cafe Hostess (1940) as Eddie Morgan
- 20 Mule Team (1940) as Stag Roper
- Wagons Westward (1940) as Bill Marsden
- Pier 13 (1940) as Johnnie Hale
- The Leather Pushers (1940) as Slick Connolly
- Cherokee Strip (1940) as Alf Barrett
- East of the River (1940) as Cy Turner
- Ellery Queen, Master Detective (1940) as Rocky Taylor
- The Great Swindle (1941) as Rocky Andrews
- The Parson of Panamint (1941) as Chappie Ellerton
- Tanks a Million (1941) as Capt. Rossmead
- Dangerous Lady (1941) as Police Sgt. Brent
- Doctors Don't Tell (1941) as Joe Grant
- Secret of the Wastelands (1941) as Slade Salters
- Mr. District Attorney (1941) as Vincent Mackay
- Hay Foot (1942) as Captain Rossmead
- Mr. Wise Guy (1942) as Bill Collins
- Sunset on the Desert (1942) as Ramsay McCall
- So's Your Aunt Emma (1942) as Gus Hammond
- Mississippi Gambler (1942) as Chet Matthews
- I Live on Danger (1942) as Joey Farr
- Somewhere I'll Find You (1942) as Army Captain (uncredited)
- The Man in the Trunk (1942) as Ed Mygatt
- Pittsburgh (1942) as Mort Frawley (uncredited)
- Lost Canyon (1942) as Jeff Burton
- Stand by for Action (1942) as Ensign Martin
- Gildersleeve's Bad Day (1943) as Louie Barton
- Dr. Gillespie's Criminal Case (1943) as Wallace (uncredited)
- Jitterbugs (1943) as Malcolm Bennett
- Colt Comrades (1943) as Joe Brass
- Sleepy Lagoon (1943) as J. 'The Brain' Lucarno
- Swing Shift Maisie (1943) as Investigator (uncredited)
- The Kansan (1943) as Ben Nash
- Bar 20 (1943) as Henchman Slash
- The Chance of a Lifetime (1943) as Nails Blanton (uncredited)
- Minesweeper (1943) as Cutter Lt. Wells
- Riding High (1943) as Brown (uncredited)
- The Racket Man (1944) as Toby Sykes
- Lady in the Death House (1944) as Dr. Dwight 'Brad' Bradford
- See Here, Private Hargrove (1944) as Capt. R.S. Manville
- Rationing (1944) as Dixie Samson
- Shake Hands with Murder (1944) as Steve Morgan
- And the Angels Sing (1944) as N.Y. Cafe Manager (uncredited)
- Detective Kitty O'Day (1944) as Harry Downs
- Johnny Doesn't Live Here Anymore (1944) as Rudy (uncredited)
- One Body Too Many (1944) as Henry Rutherford
- Behind City Lights (1945) as Taxi Driver (uncredited)
- Along the Navajo Trail (1945) as J. Richard Bentley
- Don't Fence Me In (1945) as Jack Gordon
- What Next, Corporal Hargrove? (1945) as Colonel (uncredited)
- Life with Blondie (1945) as Blackie Leonard (uncredited)
- Drifting Along (1946) as Jack Dailey
- Blonde Alibi (1946) as Henchman Willie (uncredited)
- The Glass Alibi (1946) as Joe Eykner
- Rendezvous 24 (1946) as Chief Agent Hanover (uncredited)
- Larceny in Her Heart (1946) as Doc H. C. Patterson
- In Fast Company (1946) as Steve Trent
- Freddie Steps Out (1946) as Coach Carter
- Chick Carter, Detective (1946, Serial) as Rusty Farrell
- High School Hero (1946) as Coach Carter
- Her Sister's Secret (1946) as Navy Officer (uncredited)
- Wild Country (1947) as Clark Varney
- Scared to Death (1947) as Terry Lee
- The Sea of Grass (1947) as Joe Horton (uncredited)
- Backlash (1947) as Red Bailey
- Undercover Maisie (1947) as Daniels
- Fall Guy (1947) as Inspector Shannon
- Yankee Fakir (1947) as Yankee Davis
- Three on a Ticket (1947) as Mace Morgan
- Fun on a Weekend (1947) as Gambling House Owner (uncredited)
- Jungle Flight (1947) as Tom Hammond
- Desperate (1947) as Pete Lavitch
- The Trespasser (1947) as Bill Monroe
- The Hucksters (1947) as Georgie Gaver
- Gas House Kids in Hollywood (1947) as Mitch Gordon
- Ridin' Down the Trail (1947) as Mark Butler
- Key Witness (1947) as Jim Guthrie (uncredited)
- Merton of the Movies (1947) as Phil
- Roses Are Red (1947) as Ace Oliver
- Rose of Santa Rosa (1947) as Larry Fish
- If You Knew Susie (1948) as Marty
- Black Bart (1948) as Sheriff Mix (uncredited)
- Docks of New Orleans (1948) as Grock
- The Dude Goes West (1948) as Beetle
- Waterfront at Midnight (1948) as Joe Sargus
- Coroner Creek (1948) as Stew Shallis
- The Arkansas Swing (1948) as Howard, the Horse Trainer
- Behind Locked Doors (1948) as Larson
- Joe Palooka in Winner Take All (1948) as Reporter #1
- The Denver Kid (1948) as Henchman Slip
- Gun Smugglers (1948) as Steve Reeves
- Bad Men of Tombstone (1949) as Gambler (uncredited)
- Flaxy Martin (1949) as Max, Detective
- Take Me Out to the Ball Game (1949) as Karl (uncredited)
- Manhattan Angel (1949) as Mr. Fowley - Press Photographer (uncredited)
- Search for Danger (1949) as Inspector
- Susanna Pass (1949) as Roberts aka Walter P. Johnson
- Arson, Inc. (1949) as Frederick P. Fender
- Massacre River (1949) as Simms
- Any Number Can Play (1949) as Smitty (uncredited)
- Mighty Joe Young (1949) as Jones
- Joe Palooka in the Counterpunch (1949) as Thurston
- Satan's Cradle (1949) as Steve Gentry
- Battleground (1949) as "Kipp" Kippton
- Renegades of the Sage (1949) as Sloper
- Killer Shark (1950) as Louie Bracado
- Beware of Blondie (1950) as Adolph
- Hoedown (1950) as Gang Leader (uncredited)
- Rider from Tucson (1950) as Bob Rankin
- Armored Car Robbery (1950) as Benny McBride
- Edge of Doom (1950) as 2nd Detective
- Bunco Squad (1950) as Det. Sgt. Mack McManus
- Rio Grande Patrol (1950) as Bragg Orket
- He's a Cockeyed Wonder (1950) as 'Crabs' Freeley
- Mrs. O'Malley and Mr. Malone (1950) as Steve Kepplar
- Stage to Tucson (1950) as Ira Prentiss
- Tarzan's Peril (1951) as Herbert Trask
- Criminal Lawyer (1951) as Harry Cheney
- Chain of Circumstance (1951) as Lt. Fenning
- Angels in the Outfield (1951) as Cab Driver (uncredited)
- Across the Wide Missouri (1951) as Tin Cup Owens (uncredited)
- South of Caliente (1951) as Dave Norris
- Callaway Went Thataway (1951) as Gaffer (uncredited)
- Room for One More (1952) as Ice Man (scenes deleted)
- Finders Keepers (1952) as Frankie Simmons
- This Woman Is Dangerous (1952) as Saunders - Gambling House Prorietor (uncredited)
- Just This Once (1952) as Frank Pirosh
- Singin' in the Rain (1952) as Roscoe Dexter
- Horizons West (1952) as Ed Tompkins
- The Man Behind the Gun (1953) as Buckley
- Kansas Pacific (1953) as Max Janus
- A Slight Case of Larceny (1953) as Mr. White - Circle Star Gas Stations
- The Band Wagon (1953) as Auctioneer (uncredited)
- Cruisin' Down the River (1953) as Humphrey Hepburn
- Cat-Women of the Moon (1953) as Walter 'Walt' Walters
- Red River Shore (1953) as Case Lockwood
- The Naked Jungle (1954) as Medicine Man
- Untamed Heiress (1954) as Pal
- Southwest Passage (1954) as Toad Ellis
- Casanova's Big Night (1954) as Second Prisoner
- The Lone Gun (1954) as Bartender
- The High and the Mighty (1954) as Alsop
- Deep in My Heart (1954) as Harold Butterfield
- 3 Ring Circus (1954) as Army Payroll Officer (uncredited)
- The Lonesome Trail (1955) as Crazy Charley Bonesteel
- The Girl Rush (1955) as Charlie - Stickman
- Texas Lady (1955) as Clay Ballard
- The Broken Star (1956) as Hiram Charleton
- Bandido (1956) as McGhee
- Man from Del Rio (1956) as Doc Adams
- Rock, Pretty Baby (1956) as 'Pop' Wright
- Kelly and Me (1957) as Dave Gans
- The Badge of Marshal Brennan (1957) as Marshal Matt Brennan
- Bayou (1957) as Emil Hebert
- Raiders of Old California (1957) as Sheriff
- The Geisha Boy (1958) as GI in Korea (uncredited)
- A Gift for Heidi (1958) as Alm Uncle
- These Thousand Hills (1959) as Whitey (uncredited)
- Desire in the Dust (1960) as Zuba Wilson
- Buffalo Gun (1961) as Sheriff
- Barabbas (1961) as Vasasio
- The Andy Griffith Show (1963) season 4 episode 12 "Opie and His Merry Men" as Hobo
- Miracle of the White Stallions (1963) as Lt. General Walton H. Walker
- Who's Been Sleeping in My Bed? (1963) as Photographer (uncredited)
- 7 Faces of Dr. Lao (1964) as Toothless Cowboy
- Guns of Diablo (1965) as Mr. Knudsen
- Nightmare in the Sun (1965)
- Daniel Boone (1964 TV series) - Rufus C. Hoops - S2/E24 "The Search" (1966)
- The Good Guys and the Bad Guys (1969) as Grundy
- Run, Cougar, Run (1972) as Joe Bickley
- Walking Tall (1973) as Judge Clarke
- Homebodies (1974) as Mr. Crawford
- The Moneychangers (1976) as Danny Kerrigan
- Won Ton Ton, the Dog Who Saved Hollywood (1976) as Second Drunk (uncredited)
- From Noon till Three (1976) as Buck Bowers
- Black Oak Conspiracy (1977) as Bryan Hancock
- The White Buffalo (1977) as Amos Bixby (Train Conductor / narrator)
- The North Avenue Irregulars (1979) as Delaney
