= Guns of a Stranger =

1973 film by Robert Lewis Hinkle

- Theatrical release poster
- Directed by: Robert Hinkle
- Screenplay by: Charles W. Aldridge
- Produced by: Robert Hinkle; Marty Robbins
- Starring: Marty Robbins; Chill Wills; Dovie Beams; Steve Tackett; William Foster; Shug Fisher
- Cinematography: Donald H. Birnkrant
- Edited by: Michael Berman
- Production company: Marty Robbins Enterprises
- Distributed by: Universal Pictures
- Release date: May 1, 1973
- Running time: 91 minutes
- Country: United States
- Language: English

Guns of a Stranger is a 1973 American Western film directed by Robert Hinkle and written by Charles W. Aldridge. The film stars Marty Robbins, Chill Wills, Dovie Beams, Steve Tackett, William Foster and Shug Fisher. The film was released on May 1, 1973, by Universal Pictures.

== Plot ==
Marty Robbins plays a sheriff who is attacked by a young gunfighter. After he kills the gunfighter in self defense, he quits being a lawman and becomes a singing drifter. Marty drifts into a war between honest folks and a gang of crooks. Note: Ronny Robbins is Marty's real-life son.

== Cast ==
- Marty Robbins as Sheriff Matthew Roberts
- Chill Wills as Tom Duncan
- Dovie Beams as Virginia Duncan
- Steve Tackett as Danny Duncan
- William Foster as Ace Gorenum
- Shug Fisher as Shug Meadows
- Tom Hartman as Harley Rutledge
- Charley Aldridge as Clyde Terlan
- Ronny Robbins as Alfred Bearden
- Melody Hinkle as Faye Bearden
- Mark Reed as Young Outlaw
- Don Winters as Axe Mayhew
- Bobby Sykes as Bob Bishop
- Fred Graham as Sheriff Stoner
- Phil Strassberg as Nathan Cryder
- Al Wood as Fight Promoter
- Harold Wells as Tiger Wells
- Jack Swank as Bartender
- Du Shon as Blackie
- Glen Bond as Stagecoach Guard
- Jim Mooney as Deputy
- Jenny Needham as Sadie Ketcham
- Nudie as Blacksmith
- Ron Nix as Indian
