= Raiders of Old California =

1957 film by Albert C. Gannaway

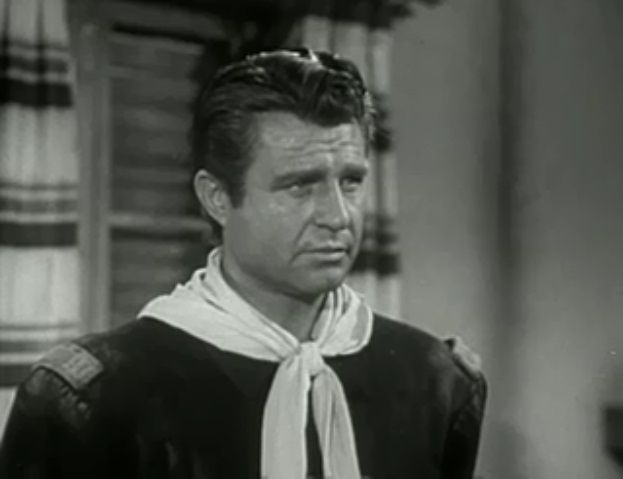
- Jim Davis in a film scene
- Directed by: Albert C. Gannaway
- Written by: Sam Roeca; Thomas G. Hubbard (associate producers)
- Produced by: Albert C. Gannaway
- Starring: Jim Davis; Arleen Whelan; Faron Young
- Cinematography: Charles Straumer, A.S.C.
- Edited by: Carl Pingitore (supervising editor)
- Music by: no credit
- Production company: An Albert C. Gannaway Production
- Distributed by: Republic Pictures
- Release dates: October 17, 1957 (San Francisco); November 1, 1957 (United States)
- Running time: 72 minutes
- Country: United States
- Language: English

Raiders of Old California is a 1957 American black-and-white Western film produced and directed by Albert C. Gannaway and starring Jim Davis, Arleen Whelan, and Faron Young. It was the final film appearance of Arleen Whelan, who retired from acting in 1957; she died on April 7, 1993.

== Plot ==
The film begins with the surrender of Capt. Miguel Sebastian (Larry Dobkin) to Capt. McKane (Davis) from the U.S. Army at the end of Mexican American War. Three years later, McKane was taking lands from their owners by intimidation and treachery.

Words reach Judge Ward Young (Louis Jean Heydt) and his son Marshal Faron Young. After a talk with Pardee (Lee Van Cleef), they investigate with Diego (Colmans), a farmer and an old veteran with Sebastian, and then they investigate with McKane, and learn about a witness in the deal named Johnson (Harry Lauter). Pardee tries to threaten Johnson to keep him from saying anything. Johnson tells Judge Young about the deal and agrees to testify in court.

McKane's men ambush the lawmen, and Johnson receives a dangerous wound, but tells them to look for Sebastian, who is still alive. They are overheard by Pardee, who goes to interrogate Diego and then kills him.

McKane's men follow Marshal Young and watch him survive an attack from the Comanches. They try to kill him, but he manages to shoot them first. He mortally wounds Boyle and takes him to the town priest. Dying Boyle identifies the priest as Miguel Sebastian himself. Pardee arrives in town and asks about Sebastian from a drunk named Pepe (Don Diamond). He tries to kill Sebastian, but is gunned down by Young.

Upon this new finding, McKane is ordered to be in court. He sends his men to kill Sebastian, but he dodges them through underground passage. McKane plans a cattle stampede through town. In the trial, Sebastian testifies that he was forced to give his land to McKane under death threat, and that Johnson refused to sign as a witness because it was extortion and collaboration with the enemy, but he was forced to sign. Sebastian testifies that although he was permitted by McKane to then leave for Mexico, Pardee had tracked him and pushed him off a cliff, thinking he had left him for dead. Judge Young rules that the grant was illegal because McKane bargained with the enemy at war time, and that McKane will be sent to be court-martialed.

The court is interrupted by the coming of the stampede, and McKane is caught in the stampede and killed, along with the sheriff. Father Sebastian agrees to give the lands to the farmers.

== Cast ==
- Jim Davis as Captain Angus Clyde McKane
- Arleen Whelan as Julie Johnson
- Faron Young as Marshal Faron Young
- Marty Robbins as Cpl. Timothy Boyle
- Lee Van Cleef as Sgt. Damon Pardee
- Louis Jean Heydt as Judge Ward Young
- Harry Lauter as Lt. Scott Johnson
- Douglas Fowley as Sheriff
- Larry Dobkin as Don Miguel Sebastian
- Bill Coontz as Turk
- Don Diamond as Pepe
- Ric Vallon as Burt
- Tom Hubbard as Emmet

== Production ==
Parts of the film were shot in Kanab Canyon, Utah.

== See also ==
- Public domain film
- List of American films of 1957
- List of films in the public domain in the United States
