= Dovie Beams =

American actress (1932–2017)

Dovie Beams Villagran
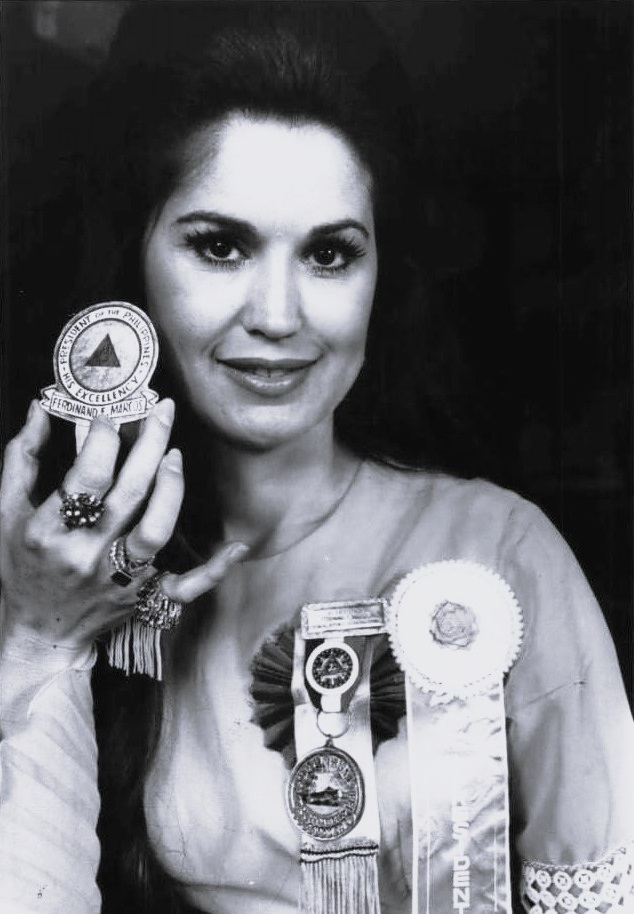
- Beams in 1971
- Born: Dovie Leona Osborne; 5 August 1932; Nashville, Tennessee, U.S.
- Died: December 30, 2017 (aged 85); Nashville, Tennessee, U.S.
- Occupations: Actress, Real estate agent
- Spouses: Edward Boehms (div. 1962) Sergio Fausto Villagran (div. 1988)
- Children: Dena Boehms Walters

Dovie Beams Villagran (born Dovie Leona Osborne, 5 August 1932 – 30 December 2017) was an American actress, best known for having an illicit sexual affair with former Filipino President Ferdinand Marcos from 1968 to 1970.

== Early life ==
Dovie Beams was the daughter of Theodore Halems Osborne (1909—1975) and Mildred Esther Jakes (1913—2002).

Beams first married and later divorced Edward Walker Boehms (1925—2016). She was granted a divorce due to irreconcilable differences in 1962. They had one child together on 24 September 1955, a daughter named Dena Boehms Walters.

After the sexual affair and scandal that ensued in the Philippines, Beams started her own real estate agency in Glendale, California, and married Sergio Fausto Villagran (born 1936). They divorced in 1988.

== Recorded sexual affair with Ferdinand Marcos Sr. ==
In 1970, a scandal hit the Philippines over the stormy break-up between then President Ferdinand Marcos and his mistress of two years, Dovie Beams. On many occasions, she had hidden a tape recorder under a bed while having sex with the president. The recording of their sexual encounter was publicly played at the radio station of the University of the Philippines and consisted of the following segments:

- Breathing and moaning sounds of Ferdinand Marcos
- Act of physically moving while in the bed as stated by Ferdinand Marcos
- Verbally declaring “I will kiss you” as Beams giggled in return
- A plea to Beams (interpreted to be purportedly for performing oral sex)
- Ferdinand Marcos singing the Ilocano folk song Pamulinaœn to Beams as a gesture of serenade.

Beams had arrived in the Philippines in 1968 to shoot the film Maharlika, a film partially funded by Marcos and meant to glorify his alleged war exploits, in which she played opposite Paul Burke as a native Filipina. Before leaving the country, Beams held a press conference, and delighted the press and public by playing recordings of her trysts with Marcos. According to her, she was forced to publicize her "love affair" as "protection" since there were many threats to her life.

American historian Sterling Seagrave wrote the following regarding the tapes:

Student protesters at the University of the Philippines commandeered the campus radio station and broadcast a looped tape; soon the entire nation was listening in astonishment to President Marcos begging Dovie Beams to perform oral sex. For over a week the President's hoarse injunctions boomed out over university loudspeakers.

== According to Herminio Rotea ==
Philippine author Hermie Rotea wrote in his book on the scandal that Beams, besides weakening Marcos' status, had had a positive influence of empowering modern women in Philippine society:

“In the beginning, (birth-control pills) were banned because of their alleged harmful effects and the opposition of the Roman Catholic Church. But Dovie had told Marcos:

"Look at me. I have been taking birth control pills for years and you don't see anything wrong with me—do you?"

Thus after that they brought birth control pills into the Philippines, and now the people were free to make their own decisions regarding having or not having babies.”

== Criminal arrest ==
In November 1987, Beams and her husband Sergio Villagran were arrested in Los Angeles County for committing bank fraud related to her real estate agency for the purpose of maintaining their luxurious lifestyle in Pasadena, California.

On 18 December 1987, Beams was given an eight-year sentence in prison while Villagran received a five-year sentence. Attorney Mr. James Ian Stang at the Los Angeles Superior Court testified for the prosecution.

== Later years and death ==
On 7 October 2013, Imelda Marcos declared on a public televised interview with TV presenter Solita Monsod that Beams was innocent of her sexual encounter with Ferdinand Marcos, Sr. She revealed that Beams personally wrote a correspondence to her on 10 April 1986 in Hawaii asking forgiveness for purportedly being used by foreign American agents as a proxy spy to disrupt the physical health and political stability of her husband. Imelda Marcos also stated that she "pitied" Beams for being caught in the public scandal that ensued prior to her leaving the Philippines.

Journalist George Sison narrated how Imelda Marcos confronted Ferdinand Marcos, Sr. one night after getting a tape that included audio recordings of Beams and Ferdinand Marcos, Sr. having sex:

Even from a distance, I could see Mr. Marcos turning purple. I knew this could be the beginning of the end for me. Mr. Marcos did not speak a word, like a boy caught stealing from the cookie jar. I decided to break the ice and Mrs. Marcos' unceasing tirades by cracking knock-knock jokes, which made him smile and even laugh.

— George Sison, How Imelda confirmed Ferdinand Marcos’ affair with Dovie Beams, Philippine Daily Inquirer

On 30 December 2017, Beams died in Nashville, Tennessee due to lung cancer and comorbidity, associated with both alcohol and long-term tobacco use.

== Filmography ==
Year	Title	Role	Notes
1969	Wild Wheels	Ann	
1973	Guns of a Stranger	Virginia Duncan	
1977	The Kentucky Fried Movie	Concubine	(final film role)
1987	Maharlika	Isabella	Completed in 1970 a.k.a. Guerrilla Strike Force (International English title)

== References and further reading ==
- Hau, Caroline S. (2019), "Dovie Beams and Philippine Politics: A President's Scandalous Affair and First Lady Power on the Eve of Martial Law", Philippine Studies: Historical and Ethnographic Viewpoints, 67 (3), doi:10.13185/2244-1638.1027
