= Naturama =

Naturama was a widescreen movie technique used by Republic Pictures, during the 1950s.

== Films produced in Naturama format ==
- The Maverick Queen (1956)
- Juvenile Jungle (1956)
- Lisbon (1956)
- Accused of Murder (1956)
- Thunder Over Arizona (1956)
- Affair in Reno (1957)
- The Crooked Circle (1957)
- Last Stagecoach West (1957)
- Duel at Apache Wells (1957)
- Hell's Crossroads (1957)
- The Wayward Girl (1957)
- The Lawless Eighties (1958)
- Young and Wild (1958)
- Man or Gun (1958)
- The Man Who Died Twice (1958)
- The Notorious Mr. Monks (1958)
- No Place to Land (1958)
- Plunderers of Painted Flats (1959)
