= Miguel Ángel Álvarez =

Puerto Rican comedian and actor

- Born: August 25, 1928; San Juan, Puerto Rico
- Died: January 16, 2011 (aged 82); Guaynabo, Puerto Rico
- Occupations: Actor and comedian
- Known for: Barrio Cuatro Calles

Miguel Ángel Álvarez, also known as "El Men," (August 25, 1928 – January 16, 2011), was a Puerto Rican actor and comedian.

== Early years ==
Álvarez was born in San Juan, Puerto Rico, and when he was a child his family moved to Bayamón, Puerto Rico, where he was raised and received his primary and secondary education.

== Career ==
Álvarez began his artistic career as a radio announcer, working for radio station WIAC, which was broadcasting out of Yauco and Bayamón. On October 31, 1950, Álvarez was among a group of reporters who covered the gunfight at Salón Boricua between Vidal Santiago Díaz, a Nationalist who was the personal barber of Pedro Albizu Campos, and forty police and National Guardsmen during the San Juan Nationalist revolt. This event made Puerto Rican radio history because it was the first time that an event of this nature was transmitted live via the radio airwaves to the public in general.

He later participated on the radio show El Tremendo Hotel (The Tremendous Hotel), starring Ramón Rivero "Diplo", and later Álvarez was contracted to do radionovelas (radio soap operas). Alvarez appeared in 1970's Un amante anda suelto.

The Puerto Rican playwright Francisco Arriví invited Álvarez to appear in three of his plays. The three plays in which Álvarez made his theatrical debut were Club de Solteros (Bachelors Club), El Caso del Muerto en Vida (The Case of the Living Dead), and María Soledad (Lonely Maria). On one occasion Álvarez was asked to stand in for Jacobo Morales in the theater production of El Cielo se rinde al Amanecer (The Sky Surrenders at Dawn) because Morales was feeling ill and he had to learn the script that very night. He acted alongside Juano Hernández in the play "Widows Walk" which was presented at the University of Puerto Rico Theater.

Álvarez's popularity grew and soon he was filming movies in various countries. Among the countries in which he filmed besides Puerto Rico were Spain, Mexico, Venezuela, Colombia, the Dominican Republic, and the United States. In 1965, he was given one of the leading roles in the Mexican film, "El Señor Doctor" (Mr. Doctor), with Cantinflas and Marta Romero. After he returned to Puerto Rico he participated in a comedy entitled Johnny "El Men" (Johnny the Man), which was about the struggles of a Puerto Rican in New York City. It was from this comedy that Álvarez took the nickname "El Men", a name which would accompany him for the rest of his life.

== Filmography ==
Year	Title	Role	Notes
1959	Counterplot	Spargo	English-language role
1960	Fiend of Dope Island	Captain Fred	English-language role
1964	Los expatriados	Arturo	
1964	El alcalde de machuchal	Johnny el men	
1965	El señor doctor	Dr. Miguel Villanueva	
1966	Joselito vagabundo	Johnny el 'men'	
1968	Agente 00 Sexy	El Nazi	
1969	El criado malcriado	Detective Martínez	
1969	La señora Muerte	Tony Winter	
1970	La captura de Gabino Barrera	Pedro	
1970	Rubí	Sr. Rodríguez	
1977	Natas es Satan	Officer Natas	also director
1999	Paradise Lost	Tameala	
2002	The Crime of Padre Amaro	Coro 'Siquem'	
2003	El fondo del mar	Encargado Bar 2	
2007	Maldeamores	Pellín	in the segment - "En Casa de los Viejitos"

== Later years ==
Álvarez directed four movies for Columbia Pictures. These were Arocho y Clemente, Dos Contra el Destino (Two Against Destiny), Natas es Satán and El Alcalde Machuchal.

In 1984, he starred, along with Leopoldo "Pucho" Fernández, in a local TV comedy series called Barrio 4 Calles in which he played the owner of a bakery shop who was in competition, and constant conflict, with the owner of the bakery shop across the street. He also appeared in El Kiosko Budweiser. Álvarez was married numerous times including to actress Gladys Rodríguez and singer Evelyn Souffront.

Later in life, Álvarez suffered respiratory problems and was admitted to the Hospital Metropolitano in the town of Guaynabo. Álvarez died in that hospital on January 16, 2011. He was buried at Santa María Magdalena de Pazzis Cemetery.

== See also ==
- List of Puerto Ricans
