= Counterplot (film) =

1959 film

- Theatrical release poster
- Directed by: Kurt Neumann
- Written by: Richard Blake
- Produced by: Kurt Neumann
- Starring: Forrest Tucker; Allison Hayes; Gerald Milton; Jackie Wayne; Richard Verney; Miguel Ángel Álvarez
- Cinematography: Karl Struss
- Edited by: Jodie Copelan
- Music by: Paul Sawtell; Bert Shefter
- Production company: Kurt Neumann Productions
- Distributed by: United Artists
- Release date: October 1959
- Running time: 76 minutes
- Country: United States
- Language: English

Counterplot is a 1959 American film noir crime film directed by Kurt Neumann and written by Richard Blake. The film stars Forrest Tucker, Allison Hayes, Gerald Milton, Jackie Wayne, Richard Verney and Miguel Ángel Álvarez. The film was released in October 1959, by United Artists.

It was the final film directed by the German-born Neumann.

== Plot ==
The story centers on a man named Steve, who becomes embroiled in a dangerous conspiracy after his wife, a femme fatale named Rose, disappears. As Steve investigates her mysterious disappearance, he uncovers a web of deceit involving his wife's past and her connections to a criminal underworld.

Steve navigates a series of twists and turns, encountering various characters who have their own agendas. He struggles to determine who he can trust, leading to a climax of suspense and betrayal.

== Cast ==
- Forrest Tucker as Brock Miller
- Allison Hayes as Connie Lane
- Gerald Milton as Bergmann
- Jackie Wayne as Manuel
- Richard Verney as Ben Murdock
- Miguel Ángel Álvarez as Spargo
- Rita Tanno as Girl
- Ulises Brenes as Nibley
- Edmundo Rivera Álvarez as Alfred
- Guardo Albani as Police Chief
- Charles Gibb as Steve MacGregor
- Yvonne Peck as Maid
- Art Bedard as Dugan
- Raúl Dávila as Messenger
