= Without Honor (1949 film) =

1949 film by Irving Pichel

- Theatrical release cover
- Directed by: Irving Pichel
- Written by: James Poe
- Produced by: Raymond Hakim; Robert Hakim
- Starring: Bruce Bennett; Laraine Day; Dane Clark; Agnes Moorehead; Franchot Tone
- Cinematography: Lionel Lindon
- Edited by: Gregg C. Tallas
- Music by: Max Steiner
- Production company: Strand Productions
- Distributed by: United Artists
- Release date: October 26, 1949 (Premiere-Boston)
- Running time: 69 minutes
- Country: United States
- Language: English

Without Honor is a 1949 American film noir directed by Irving Pichel and starring Bruce Bennett, Laraine Day, Dane Clark, Agnes Moorehead, and Franchot Tone.

== Plot ==
Jane, a housewife, is confronted during her daily chores by Dennis, her married lover with whom she has had a long affair. Dennis tells Jane that he has to break off their relationship. She threatens suicide, but when she picks up a shish kabob skewer, the two struggle and Dennis is stabbed in the chest and collapses. Jane hides the body in the house. Before she can leave, her brother-in-law arrives and tells her that he knows about the affair and that he has invited her husband, her lover, and his wife to her house that evening so that he can tell them about the affair. Jane, in a panic worrying that they will find out about the killing, attempts to flee but cannot get away from her vengeful brother-in-law.

== Cast ==
- Bruce Bennett as Fred Bandle
- Dane Clark as Bill Bandle
- Agnes Moorehead as Katherine Williams
- Laraine Day as Jane Bandle
- Franchot Tone as Dennis Williams

== Reception ==
Arthur Lions notes in Death on the Cheap: The Lost B Movies of Film Noir, "A top-notch cast is wasted in a total clunker. The film takes the award, however, for the movie with the shortest performance by a top-billed star. Leading man Tone, after his brief initial appearance, spends most of the picture as the "corpse" in the laundry room."

In his 1984 Dark City: The Film Noir, film historian Spencer Selby dismisses the film as a "shrill melodrama."

The film was entered into the 1949 Cannes Film Festival.

Without Honor was released in some markets under the title Twilight.
