= Bill Coontz =

American actor and stuntman

- Born: Willard B. Koontz; August 28, 1917; Iowa, U.S.
- Died: April 7, 1978 (aged 60)
- Occupations: Actor, stuntman
- Years active: 1949–1978

Willard B. Koontz (August 28, 1917 – April 7, 1978), also known as Bill Foster, was an American actor and stuntman.

Coontz was born in Iowa. His film career started in 1949, when he worked as a stuntman on the film Apache Chief, and he spent almost a quarter of a century working as a stunt double in films and television. He played numerous roles in numerous television programs including Gunsmoke, Bonanza, Daniel Boone, The Life and Legend of Wyatt Earp, The Fugitive, Wagon Train, The Wild Wild West, The Big Valley, Johnny Ringo, The Californians, Tales of Wells Fargo, Mission: Impossible, Bat Masterson and Rawhide.

Coontz appeared in numerous films such as Outlaw Gold (1950), starring Johnny Mack Brown; Gold Raiders (1951), starring George O'Brien and The Three Stooges; Night Stage to Galveston (1952), starring Gene Autry; The Law vs. Billy the Kid (1954), starring Scott Brady and Betta St. John; Hidden Guns (1956), starring Bruce Bennett, Richard Arlen and John Carradine; The Badge of Marshal Brennan (1957), starring Jim Davis; Gunsmoke in Tucson (1958), starring Mark Stevens, Forrest Tucker and Gale Robbins; Lone Texan (1959), starring Willard Parker; Gunfight at Comanche Creek (1963), starring Audie Murphy and, Ride a Northbound Horse (1969), Heaven with a Gun (1969), starring Glenn Ford.

Coontz starred in the 1973 film Guns of a Stranger, playing Ace Gorenum. He was credited as William Foster in the film. He retired in 1978, last appearing in the film Convoy, playing as the Old Iguana.

Coontz died of cancer at the age of 60 on April 7, 1978.
