= Kem Dibbs =

Lebanese-American film and television actor

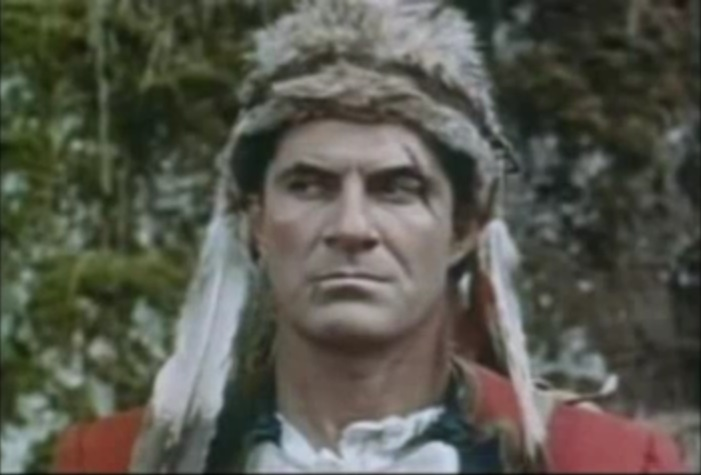
- Dibbs in Daniel Boone, Trail Blazer, 1956
- Born: August 12, 1917; Zahle, Lebanon
- Died: March 28, 1996 (aged 78); Rancho Mirage, California, U.S.
- Occupations: Film and television actor
- Years active: 1949–1970

Kem Dibbs (August 12, 1917 – March 28, 1996) was a Lebanese-American film and television actor. He was known for playing the recurring role of Deputy Mike Teague in the first season of the American western television series The Life and Legend of Wyatt Earp.

== Life and career ==
Dibbs was born in Zahle, Lebanon. He began his career in 1949, appearing in the anthology television series The Chevrolet Tele-Theatre.

In 1950, Dibbs starred in the title role of ABC's science fiction series Buck Rogers.

Dibbs appeared in numerous television programs including Studio One, Maverick, Daniel Boone, Rawhide, Bonanza, Tombstone Territory, Colt .45 and Tales of Wells Fargo. He also appeared in numerous films such as Riding Shotgun (1954), The Twinkle in God's Eye (1955), Terror at Midnight (1956), Party Girl (1958), How the West Was Won (1962) and Fate Is the Hunter (1964).

Dibbs died on March 28, 1996, in Rancho Mirage, California, at the age of 77.
