= Bruce Bennett =

American actor and athlete (1906–2007)

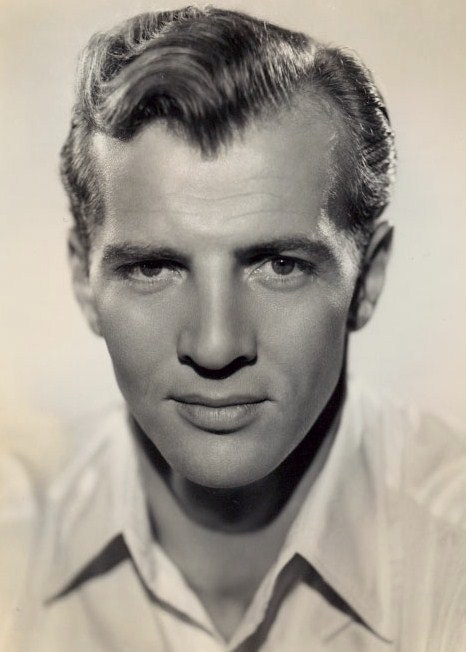
- Bennett, 1940s
- Born: Harold Herman Brix; May 19, 1906; Tacoma, Washington, U.S.
- Died: February 24, 2007 (aged 100); Santa Monica, California, U.S.
- Occupations: Actor; athlete; businessman
- Years active: 1931–1973; 1980
- Height: 6 ft 3 in (1.91 m)
- Spouse: Jeannette C. Braddock (m. 1933; died 2000)
- Children: 2

Signature
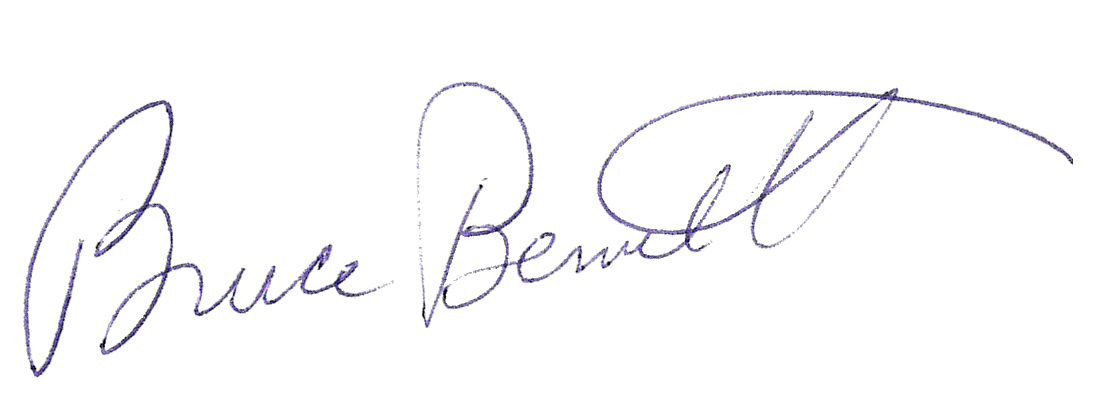

Bruce Bennett (Harold Herman Brix, known as Herman Brix until 1939; May 19, 1906 – February 24, 2007) was an American film and television actor who was a college athlete in football and in intercollegiate and international track-and-field competitions. In 1928, he won the silver medal for the shot put at the Olympic Games in Amsterdam.

Beginning with a role as Tarzan in the early 1930s, he had a long acting career in film and television that spanned more than 40 years. While he specialized in adventurer, explorer and cowboy action roles for years, he eventually also found success in serious character roles in movies including Mildred Pierce, Dark Passage, and The Treasure of the Sierra Madre.

== Early life and Olympics ==
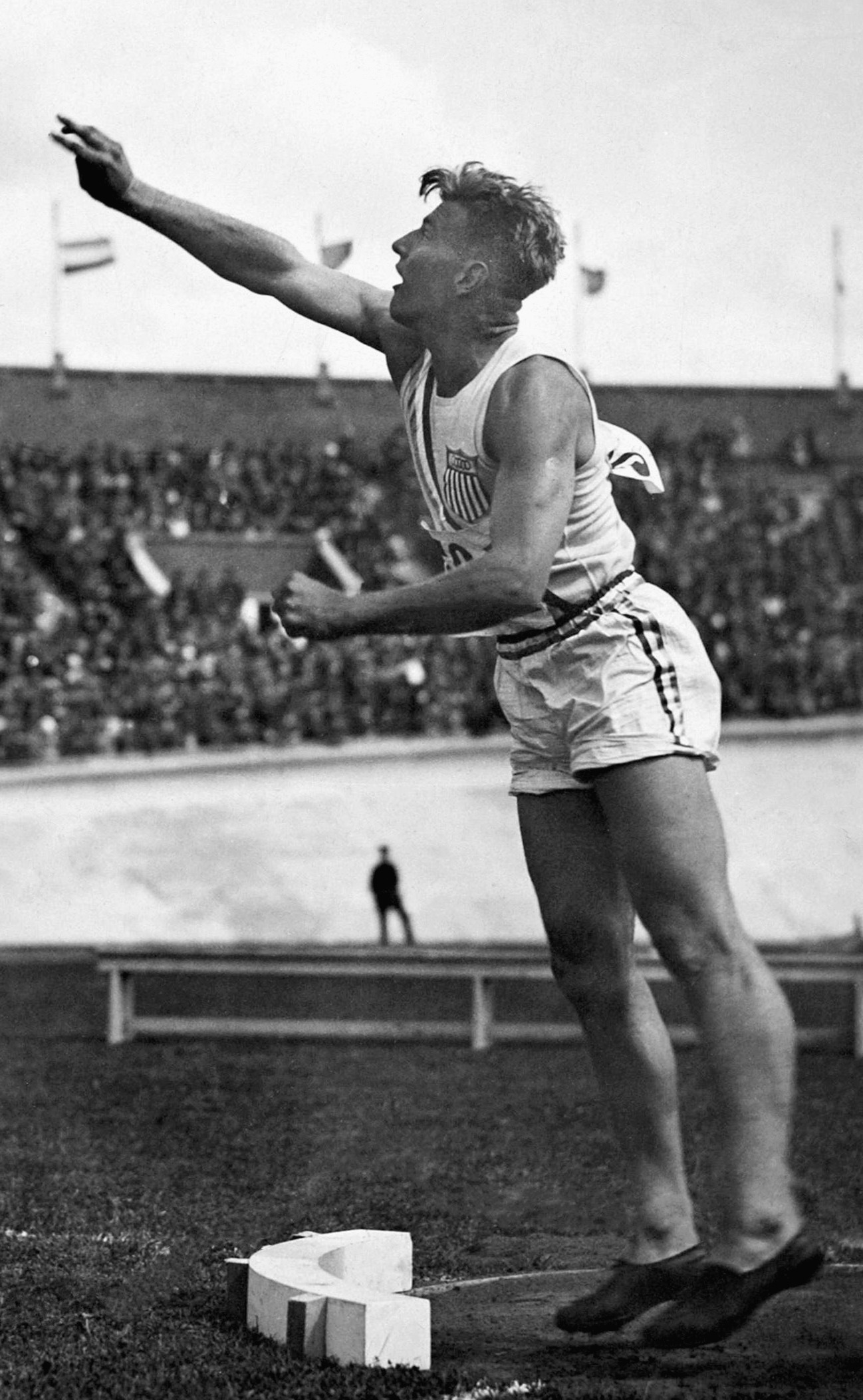
Herman Brix at the 1928 Olympics

Harold Herman Brix was born and raised in Tacoma, Washington, where he attended Stadium High School from which he graduated in 1924. He was the fourth of five children born to an immigrant couple from Germany.

Brix played college football at the University of Washington, where he majored in economics. He played in the 1926 Rose Bowl and was a track-and-field star. He won the Silver medal for the shot put in the 1928 Olympic Games. He won four consecutive AAU shot put titles (1928–31), the NCAA title in 1927, and the AAU indoor titles in 1930 and 1932. In 1930, Herman Brix set a world indoor record at 15.61 m (51 ft 3 in). In 1932, he set his personal best at 16.07 m (52 ft 9 in), but failed at the Olympic trials to qualify for the Los Angeles Games.

== Early film career as Tarzan ==
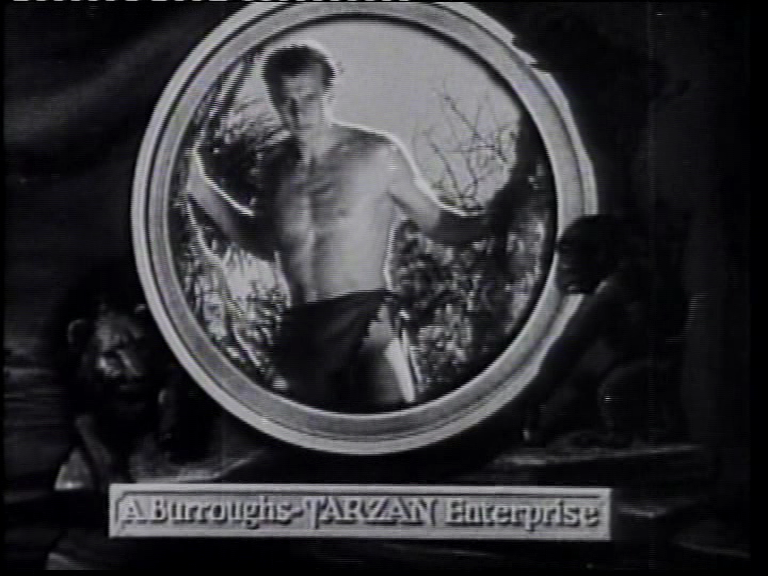
Brix in the opening credits of the serial The New Adventures of Tarzan (1935)

Herman Brix moved to Los Angeles in 1929 after being invited to compete for the Los Angeles Athletic Club and befriended actor Douglas Fairbanks, who arranged a screen test for him at Paramount.

In 1931, MGM, in adapting author Edgar Rice Burroughs's Tarzan adventures for the screen, selected Brix to play the title character. Brix broke his shoulder filming the 1931 football film Touchdown, so swimming champion Johnny Weissmuller replaced Brix.

Author Burroughs financed his own Tarzan film, The New Adventures of Tarzan, as a Burroughs-Tarzan production. Co-producer Ashton Dearholt, embarking on an expedition to Guatemala, cast Brix as Tarzan. The film began production on location in Guatemala, where the camera captured native scenery and wild animals, with Brix doing his own athletic stunts. The film was completed in Hollywood, where local studios afforded better sound recording.

The finished film was released in 1935 by Burroughs-Tarzan, and offered to theaters as a 12-chapter serial or a seven-reel feature. A second feature, Tarzan and the Green Goddess, was culled from the footage in 1938, with a few new scenes added.

In 1936 Herman Brix signed with independent producer Sam Katzman, whose Victory Pictures specialized in action pictures, Westerns and serials. Brix appeared in eight quickie features and two serials (Shadow of Chinatown cast him opposite Bela Lugosi).

Brix's Victory serials attracted the attention of Republic Pictures, a leading producer of chapter plays. There Brix starred in four cliffhanger adventures: The Lone Ranger, The Fighting Devil Dogs, Hawk of the Wilderness, and Daredevils of the Red Circle.

== Name change and further film career ==
In 1939 Herman Brix, finding himself typecast as Tarzan, joined Columbia Pictures' stock company, under the new screen name of Bruce Bennett. He also took acting lessons and wanted to give himself a more serious image as an actor.

Columbia stock players were usually called upon to appear in anything the studio produced, so Brix was assigned to small parts in action pictures, and incidental roles in the studio's two-reel comedies with The Three Stooges and Buster Keaton. By 1942, he was playing earnest leads in "B" features.

His screen career was interrupted by World War II, when he served in the United States Navy.

In the 1940s and 1950s, Bennett appeared in Sahara (1943), Nora Prentiss (1947), Dark Passage (1947), The Man I Love (1947), The Treasure of the Sierra Madre (1948), Undertow (1949), Mystery Street (1950), Angels in the Outfield (1951), Sudden Fear (1952), and Strategic Air Command (1955), The Alligator People (1959). Among his most notable roles were Joan Crawford's first husband in the Oscar-winning drama Mildred Pierce (1945) and the wandering Texan prospector in John Huston's The Treasure of the Sierra Madre (1948).

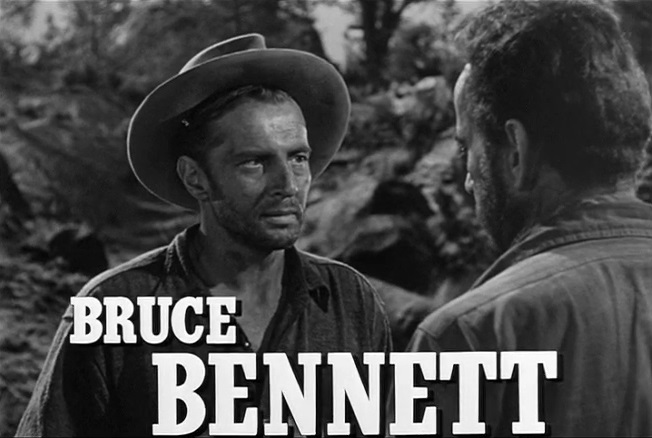
Bennett and Humphrey Bogart in The Treasure of the Sierra Madre (1948)

In 1954, Bennett played William Quantrill, the Confederate guerrilla figure, in an episode of the syndicated television series Stories of the Century. Bennett made five guest appearances on Perry Mason and five episodes of Science Fiction Theatre.

Bennett co-wrote and starred in Fiend of Dope Island (filmed 1959, released 1961).

== Personal life and death ==
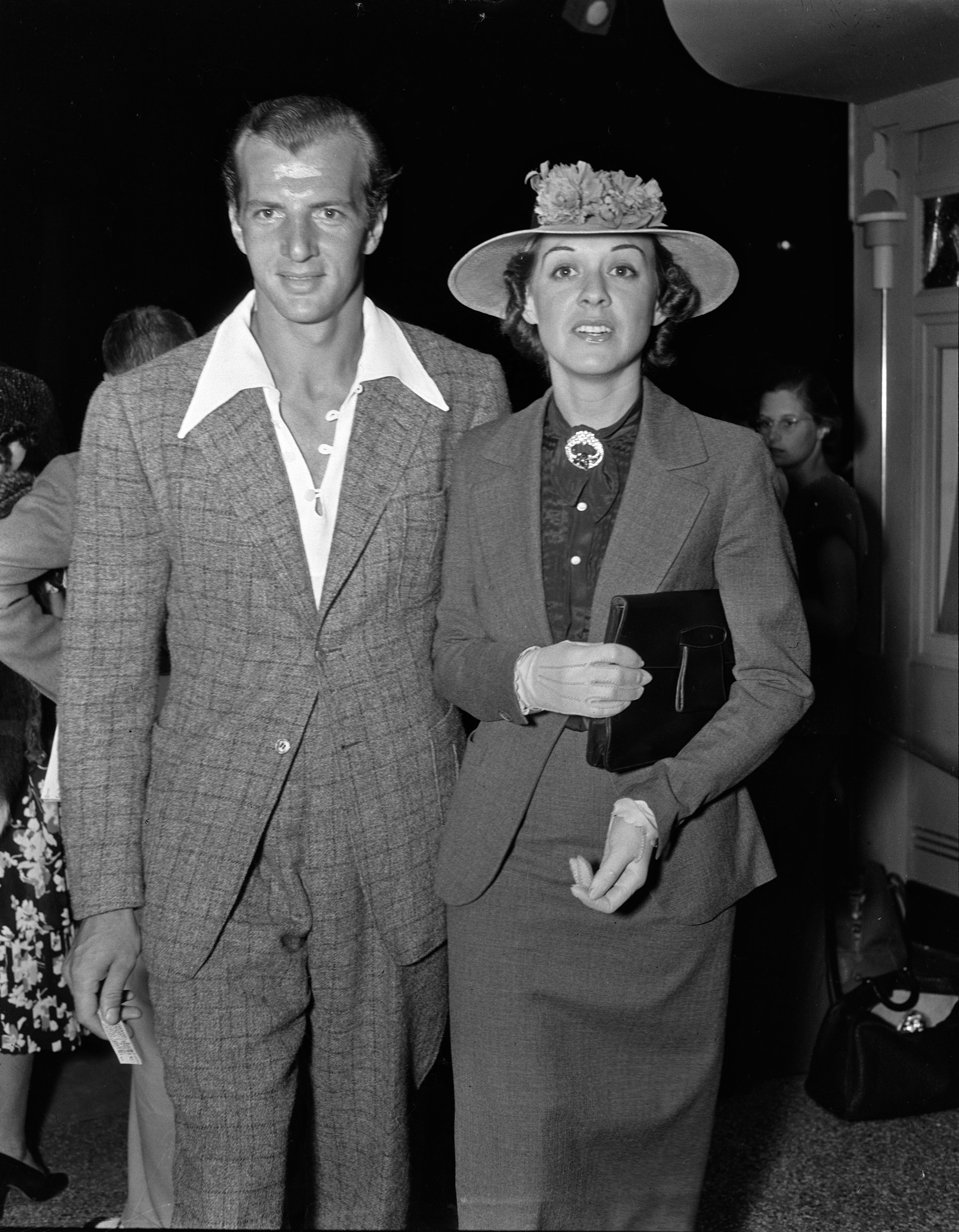
Bennett and his wife Jeannette in 1936

Bennett became a businessman during the 1960s. He pursued parasailing and skydiving. He last skydove at the age of 96, descending from an altitude of 10,000 feet near Lake Tahoe.

Bennett died at age 100 on February 24, 2007 from complications of a broken hip.

== Selected filmography ==
- Touchdown (1931) as Football Player (uncredited)
- Million Dollar Legs (1932) as Klopstokian Athlete (uncredited)
- Movie Crazy (1932) as Dinner Guest (uncredited)
- Madison Square Garden (1932) as Wrestler (uncredited)
- College Humor (1933) as Student (uncredited) (as Herman Brix)
- Meet the Baron (1933) as Train Passenger (uncredited)
- You Can't Buy Everything (1934) as Bank Clerk (uncredited)
- Lazy River (1934) as Sailor (uncredited)
- Riptide (1934) as Man at Cannes Bar (uncredited)
- Treasure Island (1934) as Man at Tavern (uncredited)
- Death on the Diamond (1934) as Man on Ticket Line (uncredited)
- Student Tour (1934) as Hercules – Crewman (uncredited)
- The New Adventures of Tarzan (1935) as Tarzan (as Herman Brix)
- Shadow of Chinatown (1936) as Martin Andrews (as Herman Brix)
- Two Minutes to Play (1936) as Martin Granville (as Herman Brix)
- Silk and Saddles (1936) as Jimmy Shay (as Herman Brix)
- Blake of Scotland Yard (1937) as Adolph – Henchman (uncredited)
- A Million to One (1937) as Johnny Kent (as Herman Brix)
- Fighting Fists (1937) as Hal "Chopper' Donovan, aka Hal Smith (as Herman Brix)
- Sky Racket (1937) as Eric Lane – Agent 17 (as Herman Brix)
- Million Dollar Racket (1937) as Lawrence 'Larry' Duane (as Herman Brix)
- Danger Patrol (1937) as Joe (as Herman Brix)
- Amateur Crook (1937) as Jimmy Baxter (as Herman Brix)
- The Lone Ranger (1938, Serial) as Bert Rogers (as Herman Brix)
- Land of Fighting Men (1938) as Fred Mitchell (as Herman Brix)
- Fighting Devil Dogs (1938, Serial) as Lieutenant Frank Corby (as Herman Brix)
- Hawk of the Wilderness (1938, Serial) as Lincoln Rand Jr / Kioga (as Herman Brix)
- Tarzan and the Green Goddess (1938) as Tarzan (archive footage)
- Daredevils of the Red Circle (1939, Short) as Tiny Dawson (as Herman Brix)
- Five Little Peppers and How They Grew (1939) as Tom – King's Chauffeur (uncredited)
- Blondie Brings Up Baby (1939) as Mason's Chauffeur (uncredited)
- My Son Is Guilty (1939) as Lefty (first film credited as Bruce Bennett)
- Invisible Stripes (1939) as Rich Man (uncredited)
- Cafe Hostess (1940) as Budge
- Convicted Woman (1940) as Reporter (uncredited)
- Five Little Peppers at Home (1940) as Jim – King's Chauffeur (uncredited)
- Blazing Six Shooters (1940) as Geologist Winthrop
- The Man with Nine Lives (1940) as State Trooper (uncredited)
- The Man from Tumbleweeds (1940) as Prison Warden (uncredited)
- Escape to Glory (1940) as Ship's gunnery officer
- Island of Doomed Men (1940) as Hazen – Guard (uncredited)
- The Lone Wolf Meets a Lady (1940) as McManus – Motorcycle Cop
- Babies for Sale (1940) as Policeman (uncredited)
- Girls of the Road (1940) as Officer Sullavan
- The Secret Seven (1940) as Pat Norris
- Before I Hang (1940) as Dr. Paul Ames
- Hi-Yo Silver (1940) as Bert Rogers (archive footage)
- Glamour for Sale (1940) as Minor Role (uncredited)
- How High Is Up? (1940) as Construction worker (uncredited role in Three Stooges short)
- No Census, No Feeling (1940) as football player (uncredited role in Three Stooges short)
- The Spook Speaks (1940) as Rival Magician (uncredited role in Buster Keaton short)
- So You Won't Talk (1940) as Reporter (uncredited role in Buster Keaton short)
- West of Abilene (1940) as Frank Garfield
- The Lone Wolf Keeps a Date (1940) as Scotty
- The Phantom Submarine (1940) as Paul Sinclair
- Two Latins from Manhattan (1941) as Federal Agent
- The Officer and the Lady (1941) as Bob Conlon
- Three Girls About Town (1941) as Reporter (uncredited)
- Dutiful But Dumb (1941) as Soldier in general’s office (uncredited role in Three Stooges short)
- So Long Mr. Chumps (1941) as Prison Guard (uncredited role in Three Stooges short)
- Honolulu Lu (1941) as Skelly
- Tramp, Tramp, Tramp (1942) as Tommy Lydell
- Submarine Raider (1942) as 1st Officer Russell
- Atlantic Convoy (1942) as Capt. Morgan
- Sabotage Squad (1942) as Lieutenant John Cronin
- Underground Agent (1942) as Lee Graham
- Murder in Times Square (1943) as Supai George
- The More the Merrier (1943) as FBI Agent Evans
- Frontier Fury (1943) as Clem Hawkins (uncredited)
- Sahara (1943) as Waco Hoyt
- There's Something About a Soldier (1943) as Frank Molloy
- U-Boat Prisoner (1944) as Archie Gibbs
- I'm from Arkansas (1944) as Bob Hamlin
- Mildred Pierce (1945) as Bert Pierce
- Danger Signal (1945) as Dr. Andrew Lang
- A Stolen Life (1946) as Jack R. Talbot
- The Man I Love (1947) as San Thomas
- Nora Prentiss (1947) as Dr. Joel Merriam
- Cheyenne (1947) as Ed Landers
- Dark Passage (1947) as Bob
- The Treasure of the Sierra Madre (1948) as James Cody
- To the Victor (1948) as Henderson
- Silver River (1948) as Stanley Moore
- Smart Girls Don't Talk (1948) as Marty Fain
- The Younger Brothers (1949) as Jim Younger
- Task Force (1949) as McCluskey
- The House Across the Street (1949) as Matthew J. Keever
- The Doctor and the Girl (1949) as Dr. Alfred Norton
- Without Honor (1949) as Fred Bandle
- Undertow (1949) as Det. Charles Reckling
- Mystery Street (1950) as Dr. McAdoo
- Shakedown (1950) as David Glover
- The Second Face (1950) as Paul Curtis
- The Great Missouri Raid (1951) as Cole Younger / Steve Brill
- The Last Outpost (1951) as Col. Jeb Britton
- Angels in the Outfield (1951) as Saul Hellman
- Sudden Fear (1952) as Steve Kearney
- Dream Wife (1953) as Charlie Elkwood
- Dragonfly Squadron (1954) as Dr. Stephen Cottrell
- The Big Tip Off (1955) as Bob Gilmore
- Strategic Air Command (1955) as Col. Espy
- Robbers' Roost (1955) as 'Bull' Herrick
- Science Fiction Theater (1955–1957, TV Series) Episodes "Beyond", "Who Is This Man?", "Survival in Box Canyon", "Signals from the Moon", "Bolt of Lightning" as Dr. Sheldon Thorpe / General Frank Terrance / Major Sorenson / Dr. Hugh Bentley / Gen. Troy
- Hidden Guns (1956) as Stragg
- The Bottom of the Bottle (1956) as Brand
- The Three Outlaws (1956) as Charlie Trenton
- Daniel Boone, Trail Blazer (1956) as Daniel Boone
- Love Me Tender (1956) as Maj. Kincaid
- Three Violent People (1956) as Commissioner Harrison
- Flaming Frontier (1958) as Capt. Jim Hewson
- Perry Mason (1958) as Lawrence Balfour
- The Cosmic Man (1959) as Dr. Karl Sorenson
- The Alligator People (1959) as Dr. Eric Lorimer
- The Outsider (1961) as Gen. Bridges
- Fiend of Dope Island (1961) as Charlie Davis
- Perry Mason (1965, S9, E6 "The Case of the Carefree Coronary") as Reve Watson
- Lost Island of Kioga (1966) as Lincoln Rand Jr., aka Kioga (TV feature version of the 1938 serial "Hawk of the Wilderness", q.v.)
- The Clones (1973) as Clone Lab Assistant
- Deadhead Miles (1973) as Johnny Mesquitero
- Let the Doctor Shove (1980) as John Vandenberk (final film role)

== See also ==
- List of centenarians (actors, filmmakers and entertainers)
