= Ramey Idriss =

American songwriter (1911–1971)

Ramey Idriss (September 11, 1911 – February 5, 1971), born Ramez Idriss, was an American songwriter, author, composer and musician, educated at Los Angeles Community College.

== Career ==
Idriss was a musician in dance orchestras on radio and recordings and in films, and also wrote television scripts and special material for the Ritz Brothers, Eddie Cantor, Jimmy Durante and Marion Hutton. Joining ASCAP in 1947, his most popular song composition was the Oscar-nominated "The Woody Woodpecker Song", as featured in the film Wet Blanket Policy in 1948. Other compositions included "Worry Worry Worry", "The Old Chaperone", "Take a Letter Miss Smith", "I'll Wait", "Leave It to Joan" and "Something Old Something New."

George Tibbles who co-wrote "The Woody Woodpecker Song" with him, remained friends for the next 23 years until Idriss' death. Tibbles was a TV producer and eventual head writer of the television series, My Three Sons, in the 1960s. He gave Idriss music composing and script writing assignments on the show.
