= List of American films of 1957 =

More than 300 American feature films were released in 1957.

The Bridge on the River Kwai won the Academy Award for Best Picture.

== A-B ==
Title	Director	Cast	Genre	Notes
12 Angry Men	Sidney Lumet	Lee J. Cobb, Henry Fonda, Jack Warden	Drama	United Artists
20 Million Miles to Earth	Nathan H. Juran	William Hopper, Joan Taylor, Frank Puglia	Science fiction	Columbia; Co-production with Italy and West Germany
The 27th Day	William Asher	Gene Barry, Valerie French, George Voskovec	Science fiction	Columbia
3:10 to Yuma	Delmer Daves	Glenn Ford, Van Heflin, Felicia Farr, Leora Dana	Western	Columbia; based on Three-Ten to Yuma and story by Elmore Leonard; remade in 2007
5 Steps to Danger	Henry S. Kesler	Ruth Roman, Sterling Hayden, Werner Klemperer	Film noir	United Artists
The Abductors	Andrew V. McLaglen	Victor McLaglen, George Macready, Fay Spain	Film noir	20th Century Fox
Action of the Tiger	Terence Young	Van Johnson, Martine Carol, Herbert Lom	Adventure	MGM
Affair in Havana	László Benedek	John Cassavetes, Sara Shane, Raymond Burr	Film noir	Allied Artists
Affair in Reno	R. G. Springsteen	John Lund, Doris Singleton, John Archer	Comedy	Republic
An Affair to Remember	Leo McCarey	Cary Grant, Deborah Kerr, Cathleen Nesbitt, Richard Denning	Romance	20th Century Fox
All Mine to Give	Allen Reisner	Glynis Johns, Cameron Mitchell, Patty McCormack	Drama	RKO
The Amazing Colossal Man	Bert I. Gordon	Glenn Langan, Cathy Downs, William Hudson	Science fiction	A.I.P.
Apache Warrior	Elmo Williams	Keith Larsen, Jim Davis, Rodolfo Acosta	Western	20th Century Fox
Appointment with a Shadow	Richard Carlson	George Nader, Joanna Moore, Brian Keith, Virginia Field	Film noir	Universal
April Love	Henry Levin	Pat Boone, Shirley Jones, Arthur O'Connell	Romance	20th Century Fox
The Astounding She-Monster	Ronald V. Ashcroft	Robert Clarke, Kenne Duncan, Ewing Miles Brown	Science fiction	A.I.P.
Attack of the Crab Monsters	Roger Corman	Richard Garland, Pamela Duncan, Russell Johnson	Science fiction	Allied Artists
Baby Face Nelson	Don Siegel	Mickey Rooney, Carolyn Jones, Cedric Hardwicke	Biography, crime	United Artists
The Bachelor Party	Delbert Mann	Don Murray, Eddie Albert, Carolyn Jones	Comedy	United Artists
Back from the Dead	Charles Warren	Peggie Castle, Arthur Franz, Marsha Hunt	Horror	20th Century Fox
Badlands of Montana	Daniel B. Ullman	Rex Reason, Margia Dean, Beverly Garland	Western	20th Century Fox
Bailout at 43,000	Francis D. Lyon	John Payne, Karen Steele, Paul Kelly	War	United Artists
Band of Angels	Raoul Walsh	Clark Gable, Sidney Poitier, Yvonne De Carlo	Drama	Warner Bros.
Battle Hymn	Douglas Sirk	Rock Hudson, Anna Kashfi, Dan Duryea	War	Universal
Bayou	Harold Daniels	Peter Graves, Lita Milan, Douglas Fowley	Drama	United Artists
Beau James	Melville Shavelson	Bob Hope, Vera Miles, Alexis Smith	Biography	Paramount
Beginning of the End	Bert I. Gordon	Peter Graves, Peggie Castle, Morris Ankrum	Science fiction	Republic
Bernardine	Henry Levin	Pat Boone, Terry Moore, Dean Jagger	Romantic comedy	20th Century Fox
The Big Boodle	Richard Wilson	Errol Flynn, Pedro Armendáriz, Rossana Rory, Gia Scala	Film noir	United Artists
The Big Caper	Robert Stevens	Rory Calhoun, Mary Costa, James Gregory	Film noir	United Artists
The Big Land	Gordon Douglas	Alan Ladd, Virginia Mayo, Edmond O'Brien	Western	Warner Bros.
Bitter Victory	Nicholas Ray	Richard Burton, Curd Jürgens, Ruth Roman	War	Columbia. Co-production with France
Black Patch	Allen H. Miner	George Montgomery, Diane Brewster, Tom Pittman	Western	Warner Bros.
The Black Scorpion	Edward Ludwig	Richard Denning, Mara Corday, Carlos Rivas	Science fiction	Warner Bros.
Bombers B-52	Gordon Douglas	Natalie Wood, Karl Malden, Efrem Zimbalist Jr.	Drama	Warner Bros.
Bop Girl Goes Calypso	Howard W. Koch	Judy Tyler, Bobby Troup, Margo Woode	Musical	United Artists
Boy on a Dolphin	Jean Negulesco	Alan Ladd, Sophia Loren, Clifton Webb	Drama	Fox
The Brain from Planet Arous	Nathan H. Juran	John Agar, Joyce Meadows, Robert Fuller	Science fiction	Howco
The Brothers Rico	Phil Karlson	Richard Conte, Dianne Foster, James Darren	Film noir	Columbia
The Buckskin Lady	Carl K. Hittleman	Patricia Medina, Richard Denning, Gerald Mohr	Western	United Artists
The Burglar	Paul Wendkos	Dan Duryea, Jayne Mansfield, Martha Vickers	Crime	Columbia
The Buster Keaton Story	Sidney Sheldon	Donald O'Connor, Ann Blyth, Rhonda Fleming, Peter Lorre	Biography	Paramount

== C-H ==
Title	Director	Cast	Genre	Notes
Calypso Heat Wave	Fred F. Sears	Johnny Desmond, Merry Anders, Meg Myles	Musical	Columbia
The Careless Years	Arthur Hiller	Dean Stockwell, Natalie Trundy, John Larch	Romance	United Artists
Chain of Evidence	Paul Landres	Bill Elliott, Jimmy Lydon, Claudia Barrett	Crime	Allied Artists
Chicago Confidential	Sidney Salkow	Brian Keith, Beverly Garland, Dick Foran	Crime	United Artists
China Gate	Samuel Fuller	Gene Barry, Angie Dickinson, Nat King Cole	War drama	20th Century Fox
Copper Sky	Charles Marquis Warren	Jeff Morrow, Coleen Gray, Strother Martin	Western	20th Century Fox
Crime of Passion	Gerd Oswald	Barbara Stanwyck, Sterling Hayden, Raymond Burr	Film noir	United Artists
The Crooked Circle	Joseph Kane	Fay Spain, Steve Brodie, John Smith	Drama	Republic
The Cyclops	Bert I. Gordon	James Craig, Gloria Talbott, Lon Chaney Jr.	Science fiction	Allied Artists
The D.I.	Jack Webb	Jack Webb, Jackie Loughery, Lin McCarthy	War	Warner Bros.
The Dalton Girls	Reginald LeBorg	Merry Anders, Lisa Davis, Penny Edwards	Western	United Artists
The Daughter of Dr. Jekyll	Edgar G. Ulmer	John Agar, Gloria Talbott, Arthur Shields	Science fiction	Allied Artists
The Deadly Mantis	Nathan Juran	Craig Stevens, William Hopper, Alix Talton	Science fiction	Universal
Death in Small Doses	Joseph M. Newman	Peter Graves, Mala Powers, Merry Anders	Film noir	Allied Artists
Decision at Sundown	Budd Boetticher	Randolph Scott, John Carroll, Karen Steele	Western	Columbia
The Deerslayer	Kurt Neumann	Rita Moreno, Lex Barker, Cathy O'Donnell	Western	20th Century Fox. Based on book by James Fenimore Cooper.
The Delicate Delinquent	Don McGuire	Jerry Lewis, Darren McGavin, Martha Hyer	Comedy	Paramount
The Delinquents	Robert Altman	Tom Laughlin, Richard Bakalyan, Lotus Corelli	Drama	United Artists
Designing Woman	Vincente Minnelli	Lauren Bacall, Gregory Peck, Dolores Gray	Romantic comedy	MGM; Academy Award for screenplay
Desk Set	Walter Lang	Katharine Hepburn, Spencer Tracy, Joan Blondell	Romantic comedy	Fox; based on William Marchant play
The Devil's Hairpin	Cornel Wilde	Cornel Wilde, Jean Wallace, Arthur Franz	Sports drama	Paramount
Dino	Thomas Carr	Sal Mineo, Brian Keith, Susan Kohner	Drama	Allied Artists
Domino Kid	Ray Nazarro	Rory Calhoun, Kristine Miller, Yvette Dugay	Western	Columbia
Don't Go Near the Water	Charles Walters	Glenn Ford, Gia Scala, Anne Francis	Comedy	MGM
Dragoon Wells Massacre	Harold D. Schuster	Mona Freeman, Barry Sullivan, John War Eagle	Western	Allied Artists
Drango	Hall Bartlett	Jeff Chandler, Joanne Dru, Julie London	Western	United Artists
Duel at Apache Wells	Joseph Kane	Anna Maria Alberghetti, Ben Cooper, Jim Davis	Western	Republic
Edge of the City	Martin Ritt	John Cassavetes, Sidney Poitier, Jack Warden	Drama	MGM
Eighteen and Anxious	Joe Parker	Martha Scott, Jackie Loughery, William Campbell	Drama	Republic
The Enemy Below	Dick Powell	Robert Mitchum, Curt Jürgens, Theodore Bikel	War	20th Century Fox
Escapade in Japan	Arthur Lubin	Teresa Wright, Cameron Mitchell, Jon Provost	Adventure	Universal
Escape from Red Rock	Edward Bernds	Brian Donlevy, Eilene Janssen, Jay C. Flippen	Western	20th Century Fox
Escape from San Quentin	Fred F. Sears	Merry Anders, Johnny Desmond, Richard Devon	Crime	Columbia
A Face in the Crowd	Elia Kazan	Andy Griffith, Patricia Neal, Lee Remick	Drama	Warner Bros.
A Farewell to Arms	Charles Vidor	Rock Hudson, Jennifer Jones, Vittorio De Sica	War	20th Century Fox. From Ernest Hemingway novel.
Fear Strikes Out	Robert Mulligan	Anthony Perkins, Karl Malden, Adam Williams	Sports	Paramount Pictures. Life of Jimmy Piersall.
Fire Down Below	Robert Parrish	Robert Mitchum, Jack Lemmon, Rita Hayworth	Adventure	Columbia
Flesh and the Spur	Edward L. Cahn	John Agar, Marla English, Raymond Hatton	Western	A.I.P.
Footsteps in the Night	Jean Yarbrough	Bill Elliott, Don Haggerty, Douglas Dick	Mystery	Allied Artists
Forty Guns	Samuel Fuller	Barbara Stanwyck, Barry Sullivan, Gene Barry	Western	20th Century Fox
Four Boys and a Gun	William Berke	Frank Sutton, James Franciscus, Otto Hulett	Crime	United Artists
Four Girls in Town	Jack Sher	Julie Adams, Marianne Koch, Elsa Martinelli	Romantic comedy	Universal
From Hell It Came	Dan Milner	Tod Andrews, Linda Watkins, Tina Carver	Science fiction	Allied Artists
Funny Face	Stanley Donen	Audrey Hepburn, Fred Astaire, Kay Thompson	Musical comedy	Paramount; 4 Oscar nominations
Fury at Showdown	Gerd Oswald	John Derek, Carolyn Craig, John Smith	Western	United Artists
The Fuzzy Pink Nightgown	Norman Taurog	Jane Russell, Keenan Wynn, Ralph Meeker	Comedy	United Artists
The Garment Jungle	Vincent Sherman	Lee J. Cobb, Kerwin Mathews, Gia Scala	Film noir	Columbia
Ghost Diver	Merrill G. White	James Craig, Audrey Totter, Nico Minardos	Adventure	20th Century Fox
The Giant Claw	Fred F. Sears	Jeff Morrow, Mara Corday, Morris Ankrum	Science fiction	Columbia
The Girl in Black Stockings	Howard W. Koch	Lex Barker, Anne Bancroft, Mamie Van Doren	Mystery	United Artists
The Girl in the Kremlin	Russell Birdwell	Zsa Zsa Gabor, Lex Barker, Jeffrey Stone	Thriller	Universal
God Is My Partner	William F. Claxton	Walter Brennan, Marion Ross, John Hoyt	Drama	20th Century Fox
The Green-Eyed Blonde	Bernard Girard	Susan Oliver, Beverly Long, Melinda Plowman	Drama	Warner Bros.
Gun Battle at Monterey	Sidney Franklin, Carl K. Hittleman	Sterling Hayden, Pamela Duncan, Mary Beth Hughes	Western	Allied Artists
Gun Duel in Durango	Sidney Salkow	George Montgomery, Ann Robinson, Steve Brodie	Western	United Artists
Gun for a Coward	Abner Biberman	Fred MacMurray, Jeffrey Hunter, Janice Rule	Western	Universal
Gun Glory	Roy Rowland	Stewart Granger, Rhonda Fleming, James Gregory	Western	MGM
Gunfight at the O.K. Corral	John Sturges	Kirk Douglas, Burt Lancaster, Rhonda Fleming,	Western	Paramount. Story of Wyatt Earp; 2 Oscar nominations.
Gunfire at Indian Gap	Joseph Kane	Vera Ralston, Anthony George, George Macready	Western	Republic
The Guns of Fort Petticoat	George Marshall	Audie Murphy, Kathryn Grant, Jeff Donnell	Western	Columbia
Gunsight Ridge	Francis D. Lyon	Joel McCrea, Joan Weldon, Mark Stevens	Western	United Artists
The Halliday Brand	Joseph H. Lewis	Joseph Cotten, Viveca Lindfors, Betsy Blair	Western	United Artists
The Happy Road	Gene Kelly	Gene Kelly, Barbara Laage, Michael Redgrave	Comedy	MGM
The Hard Man	George Sherman	Guy Madison, Valerie French, Lorne Greene	Western	Columbia
A Hatful of Rain	Fred Zinnemann	Eva Marie Saint, Don Murray, Tony Franciosa	Drama	20th Century Fox
Hear Me Good	Don McGuire	Hal March, Merry Anders, Jean Willes	Comedy	Paramount
Heaven Knows, Mr. Allison	John Huston	Deborah Kerr, Robert Mitchum	Drama	20th Century Fox. 2 Oscar nominations
The Helen Morgan Story	Michael Curtiz	Ann Blyth, Paul Newman, Richard Carlson	Biography	Warner Bros.
Hell Bound	William J. Hole Jr.	John Russell, June Blair, Stuart Whitman	Crime	United Artists
Hell Canyon Outlaws	Paul Landres	Dale Robertson, Brian Keith, Rossana Rory	Western	Republic
Hell on Devil's Island	Christian Nyby	William Talman, Helmut Dantine, Donna Martell	Adventure	20th Century Fox
Hell Ship Mutiny	Lee Sholem	Jon Hall, Roberta Haynes, Peter Lorre	Adventure	Republic
Hell's Crossroads	Franklin Adreon	Peggie Castle, Robert Vaughn, Stephen McNally	Western	Republic
Hellcats of the Navy	Nathan Juran	Ronald Reagan, Nancy Davis, Arthur Franz	Drama	United Artists
Hidden Fear	André de Toth	John Payne, Conrad Nagel, Alexander Knox	Crime	United Artists
The Hired Gun	Ray Nazarro	Rory Calhoun, Anne Francis, Chuck Connors	Western	MGM
Hit and Run	Hugo Haas	Cleo Moore, Vince Edwards, Hugo Haas	Crime	United Artists
Hold That Hypnotist	Austen Jewell	Huntz Hall, Stanley Clements, Jane Nigh	Comedy	Allied Artists
Hot Rod Rumble	Leslie H. Martinson	Leigh Snowden, Wright King, Joey Forman	Drama	Allied Artists
Hot Summer Night	David Friedkin	Leslie Nielsen, Colleen Miller, Jay C. Flippen	Crime	MGM
House of Numbers	Russell Rouse	Jack Palance, Barbara Lang, Harold J. Stone	Crime	MGM. Based on Jack Finney story.

== I-N ==
Title	Director	Cast	Genre	Notes
I Was a Teenage Frankenstein	Herbert L. Strock	Whit Bissell, Phyllis Coates, Robert Burton	Science fiction	AIP
I Was a Teenage Werewolf	Gene Fowler Jr.	Michael Landon, Whit Bissell, Yvonne Lime	Science fiction	AIP
The Incredible Petrified World	Jerry Warren	John Considine, Phyllis Coates, Robert Clarke	Science fiction	Independent
The Incredible Shrinking Man	Jack Arnold	Grant Williams, Randy Stuart, Paul Langton	Science fiction	Universal; from Richard Matheson novel
Interlude	Douglas Sirk	June Allyson, Rossano Brazzi, Marianne Koch	Drama	Universal
Invasion of the Saucer Men	Edward Cahn	Gloria Castillo, Frank Gorshin, Steve Terrell	Science fiction	AIP
The Invisible Boy	Herman Hoffman	Richard Eyer, Diane Brewster, Philip Abbott	Science fiction	MGM
The Iron Sheriff	Sidney Salkow	Sterling Hayden, Constance Ford, Kent Taylor	Western	United Artists
Island in the Sun	Robert Rossen	James Mason, Joan Fontaine, Harry Belafonte	Drama	20th Century Fox
Istanbul	Joseph Pevney	Errol Flynn, Cornell Borchers, John Bentley	Film noir	Universal
Jailhouse Rock	Richard Thorpe	Elvis Presley, Judy Tyler, Mickey Shaughnessy	Musical drama	MGM
Jamboree	Roy Lockwood	Frankie Avalon, Fats Domino, Jerry Lee Lewis	Musical	Warner Bros.
Jeanne Eagels	George Sidney	Kim Novak, Jeff Chandler, Charles Drake	Biography	Columbia
Jet Pilot	Josef von Sternberg	John Wayne, Janet Leigh, Jay C. Flippen	War	RKO
Joe Butterfly	Jesse Hibbs	Audie Murphy, Keenan Wynn, George Nader	Comedy	Universal
Joe Dakota	Richard Bartlett	Jock Mahoney, Luana Patten, Charles McGraw	Western	Universal
Johnny Tremain	Robert Stevenson	Hal Stalmaster, Luana Patten, Sebastian Cabot	Adventure	Disney
Johnny Trouble	John H. Auer	Ethel Barrymore, Stuart Whitman, Cecil Kellaway	Drama	Warner Bros.
The Joker Is Wild	Charles Vidor	Frank Sinatra, Mitzi Gaynor, Jeanne Crain	Biography	Paramount. Story of Joe E. Lewis.
Jungle Heat	Howard W. Koch	Lex Barker, Mari Blanchard, Glenn Langan	Adventure	United Artists
Kelly and Me	Robert Z. Leonard	Van Johnson, Piper Laurie, Martha Hyer	Musical comedy	Universal
The Kettles on Old MacDonald's Farm	Virgil Vogel	Marjorie Main, Parker Fennelly, Gloria Talbott	Comedy	Universal
Kiss Them for Me	Stanley Donen	Cary Grant, Suzy Parker, Jayne Mansfield	Comedy	20th Century Fox. Based on the Broadway play.
Kronos	Kurt Neumann	Jeff Morrow, Barbara Lawrence, George O'Hanlon	Horror, science fiction	20th Century Fox
The Land Unknown	Virgil W. Vogel	Jock Mahoney, Shirley Patterson, William Reynolds	Science fiction	Universal
Last of the Badmen	Paul Landres	George Montgomery, Keith Larsen, James Best	Western	Allied Artists
The Last Stagecoach West	Joseph Kane	Jim Davis, Mary Castle, Victor Jory	Western	Republic
The Lawless Eighties	Joseph Kane	Buster Crabbe, John Smith, Ted de Corsia	Western	Republic
Legend of the Lost	Henry Hathaway	John Wayne, Sophia Loren, Rossano Brazzi	Adventure	United Artists
Les Girls	George Cukor	Mitzi Gaynor, Gene Kelly, Kay Kendall	Musical	MGM; 2 Golden Globes; 3 Oscar nominations
The Little Hut	Mark Robson	Ava Gardner, Stewart Granger, David Niven	Romantic comedy	MGM
The Living Idol	Albert Lewin	Steve Forrest, Liliane Montevecchi, James Robertson Justice	Horror	MGM
Lizzie	Hugo Haas	Eleanor Parker, Richard Boone, Joan Blondell	Film noir	MGM
The Lonely Man	Henry Levin	Jack Palance, Anthony Perkins, Neville Brand	Western	Paramount
Looking for Danger	Austen Jewell	Huntz Hall, Stanley Clements, Michael Granger	Comedy	Allied Artists
Love in the Afternoon	Billy Wilder	Gary Cooper, Audrey Hepburn, Maurice Chevalier	Romance	Allied Artists
Love Slaves of the Amazons	Curt Siodmak	Don Taylor, Eduardo Ciannelli, John Herbert	Adventure	Universal
Loving You	Hal Kanter	Elvis Presley, Lizabeth Scott, Wendell Corey	Musical drama	Paramount
Lure of the Swamp	Hubert Cornfield	Marshall Thompson, Joan Vohs, Willard Parker	Adventure	20th Century Fox
Man Afraid	Harry Keller	George Nader, Phyllis Thaxter, Tim Hovey	Film noir	Universal
Man of a Thousand Faces	Joseph Pevney	James Cagney, Dorothy Malone, Jane Greer	Biography	Universal; life of Lon Chaney
Man on Fire	Ranald MacDougall	Bing Crosby, Inger Stevens, Mary Fickett	Drama	MGM
Man on the Prowl	Art Napoleon	Mala Powers, James Best, Ted de Corsia	Crime	United Artists
The Man Who Turned to Stone	László Kardos	Victor Jory, Ann Doran, Paul Cavanagh	Horror	Columbia
Men in War	Anthony Mann	Robert Ryan, Aldo Ray, Vic Morrow	War	United Artists
The Midnight Story	Joseph Pevney	Tony Curtis, Marisa Pavan, Gilbert Roland	Film noir	Universal
Mister Cory	Blake Edwards	Tony Curtis, Martha Hyer, Kathryn Grant	Film noir	Universal
Mister Rock and Roll	Charles S. Dubin	Alan Freed, Teddy Randazzo, Rocky Graziano	Musical	Paramount
Monkey on My Back	André de Toth	Cameron Mitchell, Dianne Foster, Paul Richards	Biography	United Artists
The Monolith Monsters	John Sherwood	Grant Williams, Lola Albright, Trevor Bardette	Science fiction	Universal
Monster from Green Hell	Kenneth G. Crane	Jim Davis, Barbara Turner, Robert Griffin	Science fiction	Independent
The Monster That Challenged the World	Arnold Laven	Tim Holt, Audrey Dalton, Hans Conried	Science fiction	United Artists
My Gun Is Quick	Victor Saville	Robert Bray, Whitney Blake, Donald Randolph	Film noir	United Artists; story by Mickey Spillane
My Man Godfrey	Henry Koster	June Allyson, David Niven, Jessie Royce Landis	Comedy	Universal; remake of 1936 film
Naked Paradise	Roger Corman	Beverly Garland, Richard Denning, Leslie Bradley	Drama	A.I.P.
Night Passage	James Neilson	James Stewart, Audie Murphy, Dan Duryea	Western	Universal
The Night Runner	Abner Biberman	Colleen Miller, Ray Danton, Merry Anders	Film noir	Universal
The Night the World Exploded	Fred F. Sears	Kathryn Grant, William Leslie, Raymond Greenleaf	Science fiction	Columbia
Nightfall	Jacques Tourneur	Aldo Ray, Brian Keith, Anne Bancroft	Film noir	Columbia
No Down Payment	Martin Ritt	Joanne Woodward, Sheree North, Tony Randall	Drama	20th Century Fox
No Time to Be Young	David Lowell Rich	Robert Vaughn, Dorothy Green, Roger Smith	Film noir	Columbia
Not of This Earth	Roger Corman	Paul Birch, Beverly Garland, Morgan Jones	Science fiction	Allied Artists

== O-Q ==
Title	Director	Cast	Genre	Notes
Oh, Men! Oh, Women!	Nunnally Johnson	Ginger Rogers, Dan Dailey, David Niven	Comedy	20th Century Fox
The Oklahoman	Francis D. Lyon	Joel McCrea, Barbara Hale, Brad Dexter	Western	Allied Artists
Old Yeller	Robert Stevenson	Dorothy McGuire, Fess Parker, Tommy Kirk	Western drama	Disney
Omar Khayyam	William Dieterle	Cornel Wilde, Michael Rennie, Debra Paget	Historical	Paramount
Operation Mad Ball	Richard Quine	Jack Lemmon, Kathryn Grant, Mickey Rooney	Comedy	Columbia
Oregon Passage	Paul Landres	Lola Albright, John Ericson, Rachel Ames	Western	Allied Artists
Outlaw Queen	Herbert S. Greene	Andrea King, Harry James, Robert Clarke	Western	Independent
Outlaw's Son	Lesley Selander	Dane Clark, Lori Nelson, Ellen Drew	Western	United Artists
The Pajama Game	Stanley Donen	Doris Day, John Raitt, Eddie Foy Jr.	Musical	Warner Bros.
Pal Joey	George Sidney	Frank Sinatra, Rita Hayworth, Kim Novak	Musical	Columbia; based on the stage musical; 4 Oscar nominations
Panama Sal	William Witney	Elena Verdugo, Ed Kemmer, Carlos Rivas	Comedy	Republic
The Parson and the Outlaw	Oliver Drake	Anthony Dexter, Sonny Tufts, Jean Parker	Western	Columbia
Paths of Glory	Stanley Kubrick	Kirk Douglas, Ralph Meeker, Adolphe Menjou	War	United Artists
Pawnee	George Waggner	George Montgomery, Bill Williams, Lola Albright	Western	Republic
The Persuader	Dick Ross	William Talman, Kristine Miller, James Craig	Western	Allied Artists
Peyton Place	Mark Robson	Lana Turner, Hope Lange, Diane Varsi	Drama	20th Century Fox
The Phantom Stagecoach	Ray Nazarro	William Bishop, Kathleen Crowley, Richard Webb	Western	Columbia
Pharaoh's Curse	Lee Sholem	Ziva Rodann, Diane Brewster, George N. Neise	Horror	United Artists
Plunder Road	Hubert Cornfield	Gene Raymond, Jeanne Cooper, Wayne Morris	Crime	20th Century Fox
Portland Exposé	Harold D. Schuster	Carolyn Craig, Edward Binns, Virginia Gregg	Film noir	Allied Artists
The Pride and the Passion	Stanley Kramer	Cary Grant, Frank Sinatra, Sophia Loren	Adventure	United Artists
Public Pigeon No. 1	Norman Z. McLeod	Red Skelton, Janet Blair, Vivian Blaine	Comedy	RKO
Quantez	Harry Keller	Fred MacMurray, Dorothy Malone	Western	Universal
The Quiet Gun	William F. Claxton	Forrest Tucker, Mara Corday, Jim Davis, James Barton	Western	20th Century Fox

== R-T ==
Title	Director	Cast	Genre	Notes
Raiders of Old California	Albert C. Gannaway	Jim Davis, Arleen Whelan, Faron Young	Western	Republic
Raintree County	Edward Dmytryk	Montgomery Clift, Eva Marie Saint, Elizabeth Taylor	Drama	MGM; based on the novel; 4 Oscar nominations
Reform School Girl	Edward Bernds	Gloria Castillo, Edd Byrnes, Yvette Vickers	Drama	AIP
The Restless Breed	Allan Dwan	Scott Brady, Anne Bancroft, Jay C. Flippen	Western	20th Century Fox
Revolt at Fort Laramie	Lesley Selander	John Dehner, Gregg Palmer, Frances Helm	Western	United Artists
The Ride Back	Allen H. Miner	Anthony Quinn, William Conrad, Lita Milan	Western	United Artists
Ride Out for Revenge	Bernard Girard	Rory Calhoun, Lloyd Bridges, Gloria Grahame	Western	United Artists
Ride a Violent Mile	Charles Warren	John Agar, Penny Edwards, Bing Russell	Western	20th Century Fox
The River's Edge	Allan Dwan	Anthony Quinn, Ray Milland, Debra Paget	Drama	20th Century Fox
Rock All Night	Roger Corman	Abby Dalton, Russell Johnson, Dick Miller	Crime	AIP
Rockabilly Baby	William F. Claxton	Virginia Field, Douglas Kennedy, Les Brown	Comedy	20th Century Fox
Run of the Arrow	Samuel Fuller	Rod Steiger, Brian Keith, Ralph Meeker	Western	Universal
Sabu and the Magic Ring	George Blair	Sabu, William Marshall, Peter Mamakos	Adventure	Allied Artists
The Sad Sack	George Marshall	Jerry Lewis, David Wayne, Peter Lorre	Comedy	Paramount
Saint Joan	Otto Preminger	Jean Seberg, Richard Widmark, Richard Todd	Historical	United Artists; story of Joan of Arc
Sayonara	Joshua Logan	Marlon Brando, Miyoshi Umeki, Patricia Owens	Drama	Warner Bros.; based on James Michener novel; won 4 Oscars
The Seventh Sin	Ronald Neame	Eleanor Parker, Bill Travers, George Sanders	Drama	MGM
The Shadow on the Window	William Asher	Philip Carey, Betty Garrett, John Drew Barrymore	Crime	Columbia
She Devil	Kurt Neumann	Mari Blanchard, Albert Dekker, John Archer	Horror	20th Century Fox
Shoot-Out at Medicine Bend	Richard L. Bare	Randolph Scott, Angie Dickinson, James Craig	Western	Warner Bros.
Short Cut to Hell	James Cagney	Robert Ivers, Georgann Johnson, William Bishop	Crime drama	Paramount
Sierra Stranger	Lee Sholem	Howard Duff, Dick Foran, Gloria McGehee	Western	Columbia
Silk Stockings	Rouben Mamoulian	Fred Astaire, Cyd Charisse, Janis Paige	Musical	MGM. Based on 1939's Ninotchka and the stage musical.
Slander	Roy Rowland	Van Johnson, Ann Blyth, Steve Cochran	Drama	MGM
Slaughter on Tenth Avenue	Arnold Laven	Richard Egan, Jan Sterling, Dan Duryea	Film noir	Universal
Slim Carter	Richard Bartlett	Jock Mahoney, Julie Adams, Tim Hovey	Western	Universal
Something of Value	Richard Brooks	Rock Hudson, Sidney Poitier, Dana Wynter	Drama	MGM
Sorority Girl	Roger Corman	Susan Cabot, June Kenney, Barboura Morris	Drama	AIP
Spanish Affair	Don Siegel	Carmen Sevilla, Richard Kiley, Jesús Tordesillas	Drama	Paramount
The Spirit of St. Louis	Billy Wilder	James Stewart, Murray Hamilton, Patricia Smith	Biography	Warner Bros.; story of Charles Lindbergh
Spoilers of the Forest	Joseph Kane	Vera Ralston, Rod Cameron, Hillary Brooke	Drama	Republic
Spook Chasers	George Blair	Huntz Hall, Stanley Clements, Percy Helton	Comedy	Allied Artists
Spring Reunion	Robert Pirosh	Betty Hutton, Dana Andrews, Jean Hagen	Drama	United Artists
Stopover Tokyo	Richard L. Breen	Robert Wagner, Joan Collins, Edmond O'Brien	Film noir	20th Century Fox
The Storm Rider	Edward Bernds	Scott Brady, Mala Powers, Bill Williams	Drama	20th Century Fox
The Story of Mankind	Irwin Allen	Ronald Colman, Vincent Price, Hedy Lamarr	Fantasy	Warner Bros.
The Strange One	Jack Garfein	Ben Gazzara, George Peppard, Arthur Storch	Drama	Columbia
Street of Sinners	William Berke	George Montgomery, Geraldine Brooks, Nehemiah Persoff	Crime	United Artists
The Sun Also Rises	Henry King	Tyrone Power, Ava Gardner, Errol Flynn	Drama	20th Century Fox
Sweet Smell of Success	Alexander MacKendrick	Burt Lancaster, Tony Curtis, Martin Milner	Drama	United Artists
The Tall Stranger	Thomas Carr	Joel McCrea, Virginia Mayo, Barry Kelley	Western	Allied Artists
The Tall T	Budd Boetticher	Randolph Scott, Richard Boone, Maureen O'Sullivan	Western	Columbia
Taming Sutton's Gal	Lesley Selander	John Lupton, Gloria Talbott, May Wynn	Drama	Republic
Tammy and the Bachelor	Joseph Pevney	Debbie Reynolds, Walter Brennan, Leslie Nielsen	Romantic comedy	Universal
The Tarnished Angels	Douglas Sirk	Robert Stack, Rock Hudson, Dorothy Malone	Drama	Universal
Tarzan and the Lost Safari	H. Bruce Humberstone	Gordon Scott, Betta St. John, Yolande Donlan	Adventure	MGM
The Tattered Dress	Jack Arnold	Jeff Chandler, Jeanne Crain, Elaine Stewart	Film noir	Universal
Teenage Doll	Roger Corman	June Kenney, Fay Spain, Barboura Morris	Drama	Allied Artists
Ten Thousand Bedrooms	Richard Thorpe	Dean Martin, Anna Maria Alberghetti, Eva Bartok	Romantic comedy	MGM
That Night!	John Newland	John Beal, Augusta Dabney, Shepperd Strudwick	Drama	Universal
This Angry Age	René Clément	Silvana Mangano, Anthony Perkins, Richard Conte	Drama	Columbia; Co-production with Italy
This Could Be the Night	Robert Wise	Jean Simmons, Tony Franciosa, Paul Douglas	Romantic comedy	MGM
The Three Faces of Eve	Nunnally Johnson	Joanne Woodward, Lee J. Cobb, David Wayne	Drama	20th Century Fox; Academy Award for Woodward
Three Violent People	Rudolph Maté	Charlton Heston, Anne Baxter, Gilbert Roland	Western	Paramount
The Tijuana Story	Leslie Kardos	James Darren, Rodolfo Acosta, Jean Willes	Film noir	Columbia
Time Limit	Karl Malden	Richard Widmark, Richard Basehart, Rip Torn	Drama	United Artists
The Tin Star	Anthony Mann	Henry Fonda, Anthony Perkins, Betsy Palmer	Western	Paramount
Tip on a Dead Jockey	Richard Thorpe	Robert Taylor, Dorothy Malone, Gia Scala	Film noir	MGM
Tomahawk Trail	Lesley Selander	Chuck Connors, Susan Cummings, John Smith	Western	United Artists
Top Secret Affair	H. C. Potter	Kirk Douglas, Susan Hayward, Jim Backus	Comedy	Warner Bros.
Trooper Hook	Charles Marquis Warren	Joel McCrea, Barbara Stanwyck, Earl Holliman	Western	United Artists
The True Story of Jesse James	Nicholas Ray	Robert Wagner, Hope Lange, Jeffrey Hunter	Western	20th Century Fox

== U-Z ==
Title	Director	Cast	Genre	Notes
The Undead	Roger Corman	Pamela Duncan, Richard Garland, Allison Hayes	Horror	AIP
Under Fire	James B. Clark	Rex Reason, Harry Morgan, Steve Brodie	War	20th Century Fox
The Unearthly	Boris Petroff	John Carradine, Allison Hayes, Marilyn Buferd	Science fiction	Republic
The Unholy Wife	John Farrow	Diana Dors, Rod Steiger, Tom Tryon	Film noir	RKO
The Unknown Terror	Charles Warren	John Howard, Mala Powers, Paul Richards	Horror	20th Century Fox
Untamed Youth	Howard W. Koch	Mamie Van Doren, Lori Nelson, John Russell	Drama	Warner Bros.
Until They Sail	Robert Wise	Jean Simmons, Joan Fontaine, Paul Newman	Drama	MGM
Up in Smoke	William Beaudine	Huntz Hall, Stanley Clements, Byron Foulger	Comedy	Allied Artists
Utah Blaine	Fred F. Sears	Rory Calhoun, Susan Cummings, Angela Stevens	Western	Columbia
Valerie	Gerd Oswald	Sterling Hayden, Anita Ekberg, Anthony Steel	Western	United Artists
The Vampire	Paul Landres	John Beal, Coleen Gray, Kenneth Tobey	Horror	United Artists
The Vintage	Jeffrey Hayden	Pier Angeli, Mel Ferrer, John Kerr	Drama	MGM
The Violators	John Newland	Arthur O'Connell, Nancy Malone, Fred Beir	Crime	Universal
Voodoo Island	Reginald LeBorg	Boris Karloff, Jean Engstrom, Beverly Tyler	Science fiction	United Artists
Voodoo Woman	Edward L. Cahn	Tom Conway, Marla English, Mike Connors	Science fiction	AIP
War Drums	Reginald LeBorg	Lex Barker, Joan Taylor, Ben Johnson	Western	United Artists
The Way to the Gold	Robert D. Webb	Jeffrey Hunter, Sheree North, Barry Sullivan	Drama	20th Century Fox
The Wayward Bus	Victor Vicas	Jayne Mansfield, Joan Collins, Dan Dailey	Drama	20th Century Fox
The Wayward Girl	Lesley Selander	Marcia Henderson, Whit Bissell, Peter Walker	Drama	Republic
Wild Is the Wind	George Cukor	Anna Magnani, Anthony Quinn, Anthony Franciosa	Drama	Paramount
Will Success Spoil Rock Hunter?	Frank Tashlin	Tony Randall, Jayne Mansfield, Betsy Drake	Comedy	20th Century Fox
The Wings of Eagles	John Ford	John Wayne, Maureen O'Hara, Dan Dailey	Drama	MGM
Witness for the Prosecution	Billy Wilder	Charles Laughton, Tyrone Power, Marlene Dietrich	Mystery	Story by Agatha Christie; nominated for 6 Oscars
Woman and the Hunter	George Breakston	Ann Sheridan, David Farrar, John Loder	Drama	Independent
Young and Dangerous	William F. Claxton	Lili Gentle, Mark Damon, Edward Binns	Drama	20th Century Fox
The Young Don't Cry	Alfred L. Werker	Sal Mineo, James Whitmore, J. Carrol Naish	Drama	Columbia
Zero Hour!	Hall Bartlett	Dana Andrews, Sterling Hayden, Linda Darnell	Drama	Paramount
Zombies of Mora Tau	Edward L. Cahn	Gregg Palmer, Allison Hayes, Morris Ankrum	Horror	Columbia

== Documentary ==
Title	Director	Cast	Genre	Notes
The James Dean Story	Robert Altman		Documentary	
Perri	N. Paul Kenworthy		Animation	Walt Disney Productions

== See also ==
- 1957 in the United States
