= The West Point Story (TV series) =

- Complete Series DVD cover
- Written by: Gene Roddenberry (9 episodes, 1956–1957); Don Brinkley (3 episodes, 1956–1957)
- Directed by: Ted Post; James Sheldon; Leon Benson; Henry S. Kesler
- Starring: Donald May (Host)
- Theme music composer: Philip Egner; Alfred Parham
- Opening theme: "West Point March"
- Country of origin: United States
- No. of seasons: 2
- No. of episodes: 40

Production
- Producer: Maurice Unger
- Running time: 30 minutes
- Production company: Ziv Television Programs

Original release
- Network: CBS (1956–1957); ABC (1957–1958)
- Release: October 5, 1956 – July 5, 1957

The West Point Story, also known simply as West Point, is a dramatic anthology television series shown in the United States by CBS during the 1956–57 season and by ABC during the 1957–58 season.

The series chronicles historical events and characters at West Point. It was said to be based on actual files documenting the history of West Point since its 1802 establishment.

The program was hosted by a fictional cadet, "Charles C. Thompson" portrayed by Donald May.

== History ==
The series was produced with the full cooperation of the United States Department of Defense, with its Department of the Army and West Point itself.

Names and dates were altered to protect the privacy of the real people portrayed.

== Guest stars ==
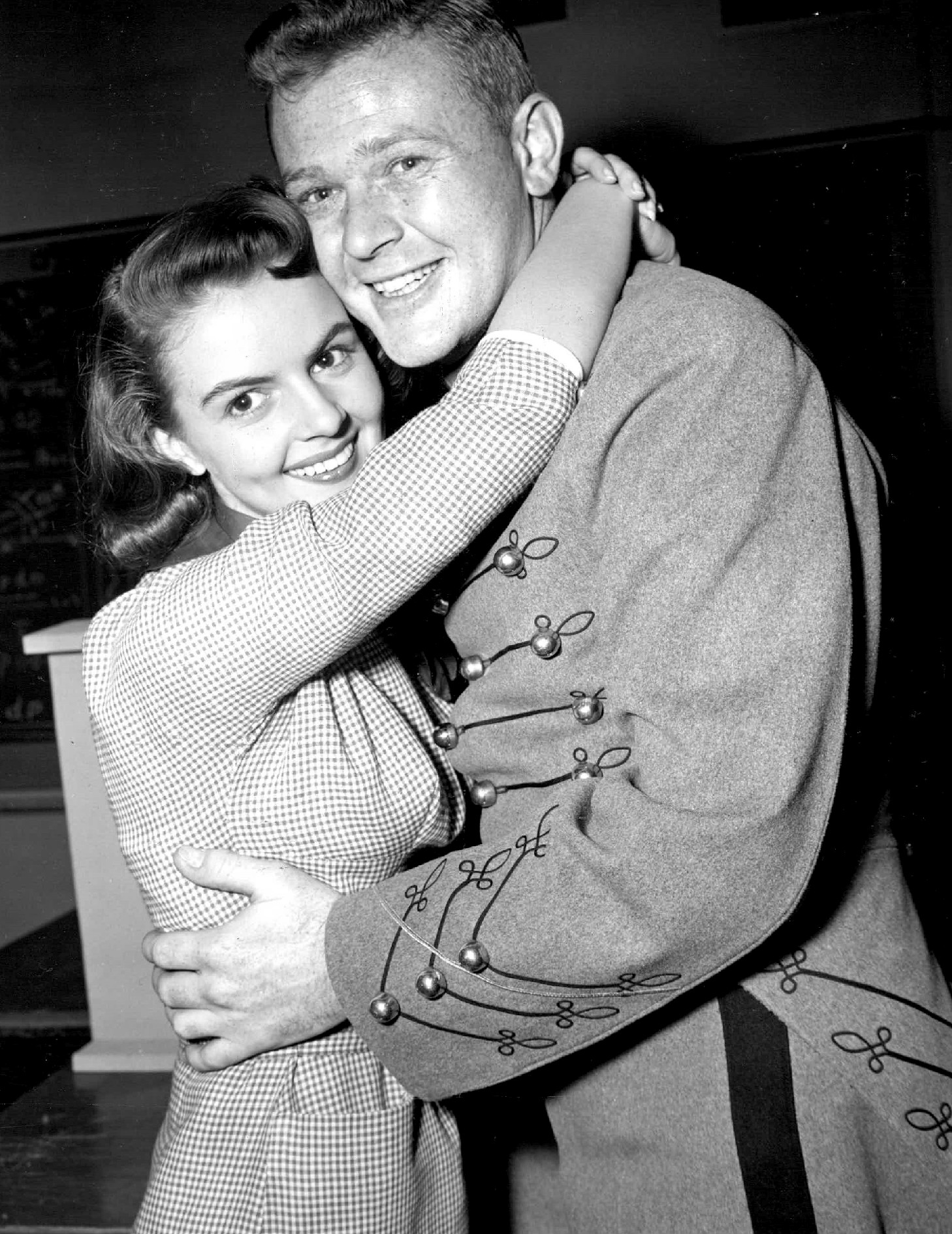
Carolyn Craig and Martin Milner in the premiere episode of the television series "The West Point Story" (1956) on CBS-TV

Among those celebrities who made at least one appearance in The West Point Story are: Carolyn Craig, Richard Jaeckel, Dick Sargent, Pat Conway, Chuck Connors, Clint Eastwood, Don Eitner, Ron Foster, Barbara Eden, Larry Hagman (miscredited), Hayden Rorke, Ron Hagerthy, Tyler MacDuff, Steve McQueen, Martin Milner, Larry Pennell, Karen Sharpe, Robert Vaughn and Leonard Nimoy as Tom Kennedy.

== Production ==
Gene Roddenberry, a productive screen writer on numerous television programs scripts in the 1950s and 1960s, often described as the first Golden Age of Television wrote all or part of ten to twelve of the 39 episodes of 'West Point'. Sources differ as to which episodes he should be credited with. General Foods sponsored the program.

== Home media ==
On February 26, 2013, Timeless Media Group (later known as Shout Factory, then Shout! Studios) released all 39 available episodes of the series as West Point – The Complete TV Series in a four-disc DVD format, under license from MGM.
