= John Smith (actor) =

American actor (1931–1995)

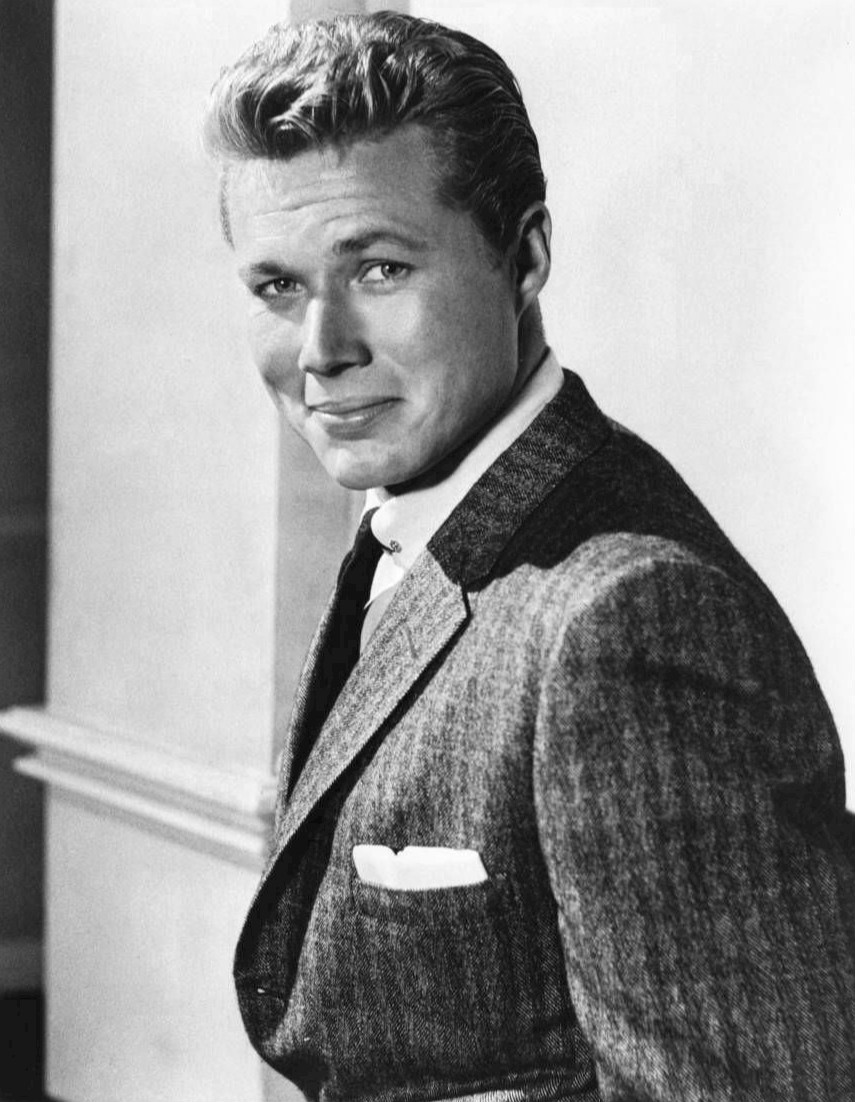
- Smith in 1957
- Born: Robert Errol Van Orden; March 6, 1931; Los Angeles, California, U.S.
- Died: January 25, 1995 (aged 63); Los Angeles, California, U.S.
- Education: Susan Miller Dorsey High School
- Alma mater: University of California, Los Angeles
- Occupation: Actor
- Years active: 1943–1975
- Television: Laramie; Cimarron City
- Spouse: Luana Patten (m. 1960; div. 1964)

John Smith (born Robert Errol Van Orden; March 6, 1931 – January 25, 1995) was an American actor primarily appearing in westerns and was considered the ideal cowboy. He had his leading roles in two NBC western television series, Cimarron City and Laramie.

== Early life ==
A descendant of Peter Stuyvesant, the Dutch governor of New Netherland in the 17th century, Smith was born in Los Angeles, California, to Errol and Margaret Van Orden.

Smith graduated from Susan Miller Dorsey High School in Los Angeles and enrolled at the University of California, Los Angeles. He sang with a dance band and played football and basketball and engaged in gymnastics during his school years.

In the early 1940s, Smith joined the Robert Mitchell Boys Choir and appeared in several films, including Bing Crosby's Going My Way and The Bells of St. Mary's, as an uncredited choir member.

== Acting career, 1950–1963 ==
By 1950, he was working as a messenger for Metro-Goldwyn-Mayer and in 1952, the studio cast him as James Stewart's brother in Carbine Williams, although the part was uncredited. He was renamed by his agent Henry Willson in contrast to the more exciting names of Willson's other clients as he was "the only John Smith in the business".

In 1954, Smith appeared as the newlywed Milo Buck, opposite Karen Sharpe as Nell Buck, in the Academy Award-winning airplane disaster film, The High and the Mighty, starring and produced by John Wayne.

In 1955, Smith played the part of James Earp, older brother of Wyatt Earp in the film Wichita, starring Joel McCrea and Vera Miles. That same year, he played the part of Willie McGill or the "Colfax Kid" in the episode "Paper Gunman" of NBC's anthology series Frontier, hosted and narrated by Walter Coy.

Smith guest-starred in 1955 in the role of John Sontag in the syndicated television series Stories of the Century, the first western series to win an Emmy Award. The episode is entitled "Sontag and Evans," referring to Sontag's older partner in crime, Chris Evans, played by Morris Ankrum. Sontag and Evans turn to crime to fight the encroachment of the Southern Pacific Railroad.

In 1956, Smith had a small role as Caleb Cope in the film Friendly Persuasion, starring Gary Cooper. He played Jeff Northrup in another 1956 film, Hot Rod Girl. He appeared as Thursday October Christian in another film, The Women of Pitcairn Island. That same year, he appeared as Wesley Mason in another film, Rebel in Town, starring John Payne.

Next, Smith was the principal guest star in "The Story of Lucky Swanson" on CBS's fantasy drama, The Millionaire, and as a character called "Utah" on Father Knows Best, the Robert Young situation comedy. He was further cast in 1956 as Steve Maguire in the episode "The Singing Preacher", with Dick Foran in the lead role, on the religion anthology series, Crossroads. He appeared as David in the 1956 episode "Cholera" of CBS's Gunsmoke.

In 1957, Smith starred with Fay Spain as a young prizefighter, Tommy Kelly, in the film The Crooked Circle. He was cast as Private Reynolds that year in the picture Tomahawk Trail, starring Chuck Connors.

Smith appeared twice on the ABC/Warner Brothers western series Colt .45, starring Wayde Preston. He was cast as The Comanche Kid in "Gallows at Granite Gap" (November 8, 1957), with Virginia Gregg as Martha Naylor and Stuart Randall, later a recurring character with Smith on Laramie, as Sheriff Mort Cory. The child actor Ken Osmond was cast as Tommy. Smith subsequently appeared on Colt .45 as Shelby Taylor in "Point of Honor" (March 21, 1958). In this episode Cameron Mitchell portrayed Dr. Alan McMurdo.

In 1958, Smith appeared in the episode "The Irwin Brown Story" of the United States Navy television drama Men of Annapolis.

In the 1958–1959 television season, Smith landed a starring role as the blacksmith/deputy sheriff Lane Temple on Cimarron City. The episodes rotated among Smith and two other stars, George Montgomery as Mayor Matt Rockford and Audrey Totter as Beth Purcell, the owner of the Cimarron City boarding house.

In 1958, he played the part of Smitty in "Letter of the Weak" in the detective series Mickey Spillane's Mike Hammer, starring Darren McGavin. In 1959, he appeared as Irving Randall in the episode of "A Night with the Boys" of CBS's Alfred Hitchcock Presents. That same year, Smith played a pilot, Joe Walker, in the film Island of Lost Women.

In 1959, Smith was cast as the young rancher Slim Sherman, the lead role on Laramie (1959–1963) with Robert Fuller, Hoagy Carmichael, Robert L. Crawford, Jr., Stuart Randall, and later Spring Byington and Dennis Holmes. From their stint on Laramie, Smith and Robert Fuller developed a lifelong friendship until Smith's death in early 1995. On the first episode of the second season "Queen of Diamonds," Smith introduced Julie London to Fuller, who also developed a lifelong friendship with Smith's co-star until London's death late in 2000.

== Later acting career ==
In 1964, John Wayne asked director Henry Hathaway to cast Smith in the role of Steve McCabe in Wayne's film Circus World. According to a Smith biography, Hathaway developed an intense dislike for Smith for unknown reasons and tried to keep him from working again in Hollywood.

In 1966, Smith guest-starred as Noble Vestry in the short-lived 1966 ABC comedy/western series The Rounders, starring Chill Wills. That same year, he played the part of Joe Gore in the A. C. Lyles-produced Western Waco.

In 1967, Smith was cast as Ed Dow in three episodes of ABC's short-lived Hondo western series, starring Ralph Taeger. He appeared in three episodes: "Hondo and the Ghost of Ed Dow", "Hondo and the War Cry", and "Hondo and the Eagle Claw.".

In 1968 and 1970, he appeared in two episodes of NBC's The Virginian, starring James Drury and Doug McClure. In 1972, he appeared in two episodes of Robert Fuller's & Julie London's Emergency! in the role of "Captain Hammer." He also appeared in 1968 in an episode of Robert Culp's I Spy crime drama. In 1971, he appeared as Dr. Carl Isenburg in the horror film Blood Legacy.

In 1972, he guest-starred on NBC's police drama Adam-12. That same year, he had his last film role as Mr. Ames in Walt Disney's Justin Morgan Had a Horse. His last television appearances came in 1974 and 1975, when he portrayed different physicians in two episodes of ABC's medical-drama Marcus Welby, M.D., starring Robert Young. And in 1975, he appeared on Angie Dickinson's NBC drama Police Woman.

== Death ==
Smith died on January 25, 1995, at the age of 63, of cirrhosis of the liver and heart problems. He was cremated, and his ashes were scattered at sea.

== Filmography ==
Year	Title	Role	Notes
1944	Going My Way	Choir Member	Uncredited
1945	Bells of Rosarita	Choirster	Uncredited
1945	The Bells of St. Mary's	Choir Member	Uncredited
1950	A Woman of Distinction	Young Man	Uncredited
1951	The Guy Who Came Back	Boy	Uncredited
1952	Carbine Williams	Robert 'Bob' Williams	Uncredited
1953	Battle Circus	Soldier	Uncredited
1953	The Affairs of Dobie Gillis	Student	Uncredited
1954	The High and the Mighty	Milo Buck	
1955	Seven Angry Men	Frederick Brown	
1955	We're No Angels	Medical Officer Arnaud	
1955	Wichita	Jim Earp	
1955	Desert Sands	Private Rex Tyle	
1956	Ghost Town	Duff Dailey	
1956	The Bold and the Brave	Smith	
1956	Quincannon, Frontier Scout	Lieutenant Phil Hostedder	
1956	Rebel in Town	Wesley Mason	
1956	Hot Rod Girl	Jeff Northrup	
1956	Friendly Persuasion	Caleb Cope	
1956	The Women of Pitcairn Island	Thursday October Christian	
1957	Tomahawk Trail	Private Reynolds	
1957	Fury at Showdown	Miley Sutton	
1957	The Kettles on Old MacDonald's Farm	Brad Johnson	
1957	The Lawless Eighties	William Wesley Van Orsdel, aka Brother Van	
1957	The Crooked Circle	Tommy Kelly	
1958	Handle with Care	Bill Reeves	
1959	Alfred Hitchcock Presents	Irving Randall	Season 4 Episode 30: A Night with the Boys"
1959	Island of Lost Women	Joe Walker	
1964	Circus World	Steve McCabe	
1966	Waco	Joe Gore	
1971	Blood Legacy	Dr. Carl Isenburg	
1972	Justin Morgan Had a Horse	Mr. Ames	
