= The D.I. =

1957 film

- Theatrical release poster
- Directed by: Jack Webb
- Written by: James Lee Barrett
- Produced by: Jack Webb
- Starring: Jack Webb; Jackie Loughery; Don Dubbins; Lin McCarthy; Monica Lewis
- Cinematography: Edward Colman
- Edited by: Robert M. Leeds
- Music by: David Buttolph
- Production company: Mark VII Limited
- Distributed by: Warner Bros. Pictures
- Release date: May 5, 1957
- Running time: 106 minutes
- Country: United States
- Language: English
- Budget: $500,000
- Box office: $2.5 million (rentals)

The D.I. is a 1957 American military drama film starring and directed by Jack Webb. The film was produced by Webb's production company Mark VII Limited and distributed by Warner Bros. Pictures

Webb's co-star was his future wife Jackie Loughery, a former Miss USA.

The film was the first screenplay written by James Lee Barrett and was based on his teleplay The Murder of a Sand Flea. Barrett had been on Parris Island as a Marine recruit in 1950.

== Plot ==
Technical sergeant Jim Moore, a highly decorated and strict drill instructor on Parris Island, is charged with Owens, a capable recruit who fails under pressure. Although he has his reputation on the line, Moore is convinced that he can make Owens into a Marine and pushes him harder, but Owens continues to falter and nearly deserts. Captain Anderson, commander of Moore's recruit training company, doubts Owens will ever make it through recruit training, but Moore defends his assessment, asking for additional time. Owens, meanwhile, has been making attempts to get discharged, convincing himself he wants to quit.

After a discussion with Moore and Anderson, during which Owens reveals that his two older brothers were both Marines killed in action in Korea, Anderson is ready to let Owens go, but a surprise visit from Owens's mother reveals that his father was a Marine captain and company commander lost during the Marshall Islands invasion in World War II. She admits that she mistakenly coddled her only remaining son and begs Anderson not to discharge him, saying that he will never amount to anything otherwise. She urges Moore to continue training her son until he breaks through his problem. Soon afterward, Anderson calls Owens to his office and tears apart his discharge papers, refusing to let him quit the Marines.

Owens ultimately finds he can succeed at Parris Island and shapes into a model recruit, even thanking Moore for his efforts, though Moore maintains his tough professional exterior as a Marine drill instructor. A later scene depicts the platoon in formation, close to graduating. Moore calls Owens forward and presents him with the unit guidon, asking Owens if he thinks he is strong enough to carry it. When Owens confidently answers yes, Moore says, "Good. So do I."

== Cast ==
- Jack Webb as Technical Sergeant Jim Moore
- Don Dubbins as Private Owens
- Lin McCarthy as Captain Anderson
- Jackie Loughery as Annie
- Virginia Gregg as Mrs. Owens
- Monica Lewis as Burt

Actual Marines, including actual drill instructors, were used in the cast as recruits, and those with speaking parts were given proper recognition in the closing credits:

- CPL Lawrence Windsor Jr. as Private Severeign
- PFC Gordon Seiple as Private Carver
- PVT Douglas Wilson as Private Franklin
- CPL Charles Golden as Private Labarsky
- PFC John Ahern as Private Casto
- SGT Joseph Holmes as Private Madison
- SGT Peter O'Neill as Private Rodriguez
- PVT William Smith as Private McKinley
- TSGT Charles Love as "Hillbilly"
- SGT Paul Prutzman Jr. as Sergeant Braver

== Production ==
Following the Ribbon Creek incident that took place at Parris Island on the night of April 8, 1956, the Marine Corps was deluged with requests from various producers to make films exploiting the incident. Unlike many producers seeking to highlight Marine Corps brutality, Jack Webb based his film treatment on a teleplay by former Marine James Lee Barrett, The Murder of a Sand Flea, broadcast on the Kraft Television Theatre on October 10, 1956 with Lin McCarthy repeating his role. As the screenplay made no mention of the Ribbon Creek incident and provided a positive view of the Marine Corps, the Marines enthusiastically cooperated, and provided Webb with many technical advisers and actual Marines to appear in the film. Barrett's screenplay expanded the story by introducing the subplots of Moore's romance with a local shop girl (played by Webb's future wife Jackie Loughery) and of Owens' mother's (Virginia Gregg) trip to the Marine Corps Recruit Depot to beg the Marines to keep her son.

Portions of the film were shot at Camp Pendleton, California.

The film premiered at Parris Island in May 1957 and was shown during the training of Marine drill instructors.

Singer Monica Lewis appears in the film for a musical interlude, performing the provocative song "(If'n You Don't) Somebody Else Will," backed by the Ray Conniff orchestra and chorus. The song was released as a single by Columbia Records.

== See also ==
- List of American films of 1957
