= Portland Exposé =

1957 film by Harold D. Schuster

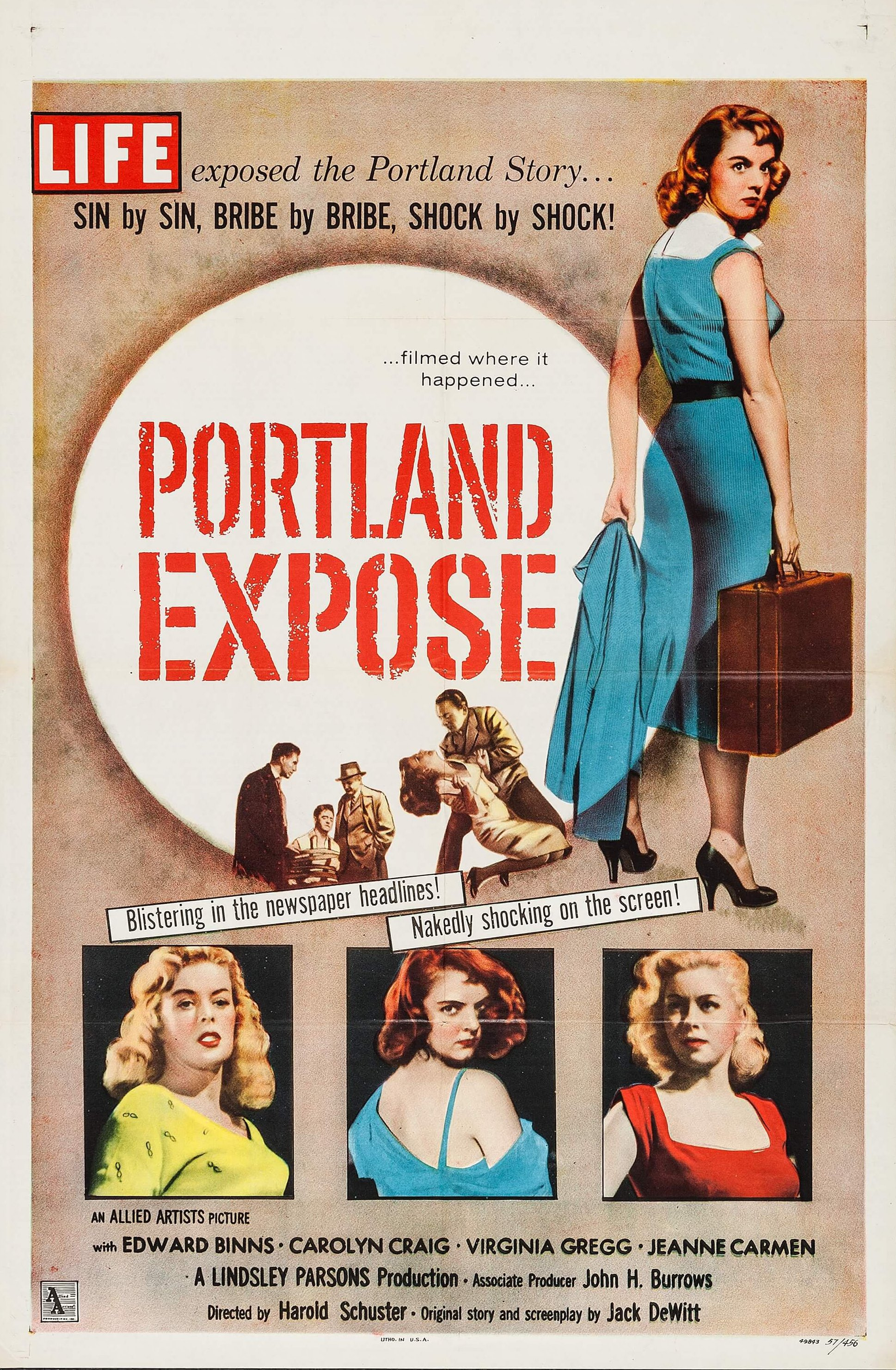
- Theatrical release poster
- Directed by: Harold Schuster
- Screenplay by: Jack DeWitt
- Based on: "Portland Exposé" by Bernard Victor Dryer
- Produced by: Lindsley Parsons
- Starring: Edward Binns; Carolyn Craig; Virginia Gregg; Jeanne Carmen
- Cinematography: Carl Berger
- Edited by: Maurice Wright
- Music by: Paul Dunlap
- Production company: Lindsley Parsons Productions
- Distributed by: Allied Artists
- Release date: August 11, 1957
- Running time: 72 minutes
- Country: United States
- Language: English
- Budget: $150,000
- Box office: $600,000

Portland Exposé is a 1957 American film noir directed by Harold Schuster and starring Edward Binns and Carolyn Craig. The plot follows a tavern owner in Portland, Oregon who is involved in a struggle for power between two gangs attempting to control the unions. The film was inspired by crime boss Jim Elkins and the McClellan Committee's investigation into Portland's underground criminal ventures in the 1940s and 1950s, which were the subject of an extensive article published in Life magazine in March 1957.

The film was distributed theatrically by Allied Artists in August 1957, though it was banned by local agencies from being screened within a 30-mile (48 km) radius of Portland.

== Plot ==
In 1950s Portland, Oregon, tavern proprietor George Madison resides with his wife Clara and their two children, teenage Ruth and young Jimmy. Pressured by salesman Spud Lennox, George agrees to place pinball machines in his business.

Meanwhile, syndicate thugs Larry and Joe, under orders from their boss, Phillip Jacman, are attempting to start a gang war by pitting rival pinball and gambling operations against each other. There are various businesses refusing to house the syndicate pinball machines and Jacman directs Larry and Joe to convince them to agree. George is the only hold out but when Larry and Joe threaten his daughter, he caves in. The deal is that the profits will be divided in half.

The syndicate's machines result in an increase in George's business, but Clara disapproves of the gambling connected to them. George finally agrees to try to rid the tavern of the syndicate's presence and agrees to covertly arrange a police raid; however, the raid is botched when police find nothing incriminating in the building. George meets with Portland's former crime boss, who warns him that the new syndicate will expand their enterprise to include drug trafficking and prostitution.

Later, Ruth goes on a date with her boyfriend Benny, but he leaves her when she refuses to have sex with him. Outside the tavern, Ruth is accosted by Joe, who has been stalking her; Joe attempts to rape her, but George interferes when he hears her screams. George overpowers Joe and holds him at gunpoint, but ultimately lets him go. Later, Larry executes Joe at Jacman's instruction. Shortly before Clara is to leave for her mother's home in Corvallis with Ruth and Jimmy, Benny visits and apologizes to Ruth. Meanwhile, trade union leader Alfred Grey begins investigating the syndicate. George is formally initiated into the syndicate after proving his loyalty, and uses his insider position to provide Alfred with information to bring them down. George wears a wiretap in an attempt to record damning evidence incriminating the syndicate.

One night, Clara phones George to tell him Ruth is returning home to attend a fraternity party with Benny. A worried Clara decides to leave Jimmy with her mother and return to the city to find Ruth and George. While George attends the syndicate's party for a madame who has recently arrived in Portland to operate a high-end escort agency, a prostitute there, named Iris, discovers George is wearing a wire; she informs the syndicate. Immediately, several men are sent to George's house to find any tapes he may have recorded, and stumble upon Ruth, whom they kidnap.

George is abducted from the party and taken to the syndicate's headquarters in a secluded warehouse. When he refuses to provide information, the syndicate beat him mercilessly before threatening to blind Ruth with acid. George claims to have buried the tapes in the woods, prompting the thugs to untie him so he can lead them to their location. After he is untied, George flees with Ruth through the warehouse. The two are ultimately saved by the unionists, led by Grey, who fight off the syndicate, allowing Ruth and George to escape to safety.

== Cast ==
- Edward Binns as George Madison
- Carolyn Craig as Ruth Madison
- Virginia Gregg as Clara Madison
- Russ Conway as Phillip Jacman
- Larry Dobkin as Garnell
- Frank Gorshin as Joe
- Joe Marr as Larry
- Rusty Lane as Tom Carmody
- Dickie Bellis as Jimmy Madison
- Lea Penman as Mrs. Stoneway
- Jeanne Carmen as Iris
- Francis De Sales as Alfred Grey (uncredited)
- Kort Falkenberg as Speed Bromley (uncredited)
- Stanley Farrar as Spud Lennox (uncredited)
- Joe Flynn as Ted Carl (uncredited)

== Production ==
Filming of Portland Exposé took place in Portland and Gresham, Oregon.

== Release ==
Allied Artists released Portland Exposé in the United States on August 11, 1957. The film continued to screen throughout the country, opening in New York City on September 26, 1957.

=== Censorship ===
Approximately 20 cities in the Pacific Northwest pulled the film from their screening schedules, and it was banned within a 30-mile (48 km)-radius of Portland, where it had been scheduled to premiere on August 14, 1957. An agent who canceled the Portland premiere stated that his primary reason was that approximately 40 individuals involved in the crimes upon which the film was based had threatened to sue should the film be shown there.

=== Critical response ===
Dorothy Masters of the New York Daily News noted that the film "has more integrity than most of its genre," and praised the direction and cinematography. Hortense Morton of the San Francisco Examiner praised Binns' and Craig's performances, adding: "It sounds simple. Actually, the solving of the case was complicated and dangerous. Certainly, for the moviegoer, exciting and believable."

Myles Standish of the St. Louis Post-Dispatch was less impressed by the film, deeming it "one of those quickie sensations which exposes nothing except the producer is hot after a fast buck... it is a trite B melodramatic crime plot, people obscured by actors."

A review published in The New York Times questioned the film's validity, noting: "At the end of Portland Expose, which arrived at Loew's State yesterday, there is a pretentious and cloying reference to the United States Senate investigation earlier this year into corrupt labor practices in the Pacific Northwest. Whatever the real situation may have been in Portland, Ore., an observer cannot help wondering whether it possibly could have borne such a striking resemblance to standard crime melodrama as Portland Expose would have us believe."

=== Home media ===
The film was released on DVD as a double feature with They Were So Young (1954) by VCI in 2006 as Volume 1 of its Forgotten Noir series. VCI reissued the film on DVD as a standalone release in 2011.

== See also ==
- List of American films of 1957
