= Fury at Showdown =

1957 film by Gerd Oswald

- Film poster
- Directed by: Gerd Oswald
- Written by: Jason James
- Based on: Showdown Creek (1956 novel) by Lucas Todd
- Produced by: John Beck
- Starring: John Derek; John Smith; Carolyn Craig; Nick Adams; Gage Clarke; Robert Griffin; Malcolm Atterbury
- Cinematography: Joseph LaShelle
- Music by: Harry Sukman
- Production company: Bob Goldstein Productions
- Distributed by: United Artists
- Release date: April 19, 1957 (New York City)
- Running time: 75 minutes
- Country: United States
- Language: English

Fury at Showdown is a 1957 American Western film directed by Gerd Oswald.

== Plot ==
Brock Michell, a peace loving ex-gunfighter, is forced to resume carrying a gun when his girlfriend Ginny Clay is taken hostage by outlaw Miley Sutton.

== Cast ==
- John Derek as Brock Mitchell
- John Smith as Miley Sutton
- Carolyn Craig as Ginny Clay
- Nick Adams as Tracy Mitchell
- Gage Clarke as Chad Deasy
- Robert Griffin as Sheriff Clay
- Malcolm Atterbury as Norris
- Rusty Lane as Riley
- Sydney Smith as Van Steeden
- Frances Morris as Mrs. Williams
- Tyler MacDuff as Tom Williams
- Robert Adler as Alabam
- Ken Christy as Mr. Phelps

== See also ==
- List of American films of 1957
