= Kanab Movie Fort =

Former military fort filming set in Kanab, Utah, USA

- Type: film set
- Location: Kanab, Utah, U.S.
- Built: 1952
- Built for: Pony Express
- Original use: film set

The Kanab movie fort is an abandoned film set near the current Kanab Municipal Airport in Kanab, Utah.

== Background ==
The military fort is an 1800s-era recreation constructed in 1952 by Paramount for the film Pony Express. It was later used in many western movies with additions and modifications made as needed. During the filming of The Apple Dumpling Gang Rides Again, much of the fort was destroyed by fire in a special effects sequence that grew out of control. Some of the fort remains in need of refurbishment. The fort has been abandoned and not been rebuilt since then.

Films partially made at the set:

- Pony Express (1952)
- The Yellow Tomahawk (1954)
- Fort Yuma (1955)
- The Dalton Girls (1956)
- Dragoon Wells Massacre (1957)
- Revolt at Fort Laramie (1957)
- A Time for Killing (1957)
- Tomahawk Trail (1957)
- Trooper Hook (1957)
- Fort Bowie (1958)
- Fort Dobbs (1958)
- Sergeants 3 (1962)
- How the West Was Won (1964)
- Daniel Boone TV series (1964)
- Fort Courageous (1965)
- Branded TV series (1965)
- Duel at Diablo (1966)
- The Plainsman (1966)
- Cutter's Trail (1970)
- One Little Indian (1973)
- The Apple Dumpling Gang Rides Again (1979)
