= Carolyn Craig =

American actress

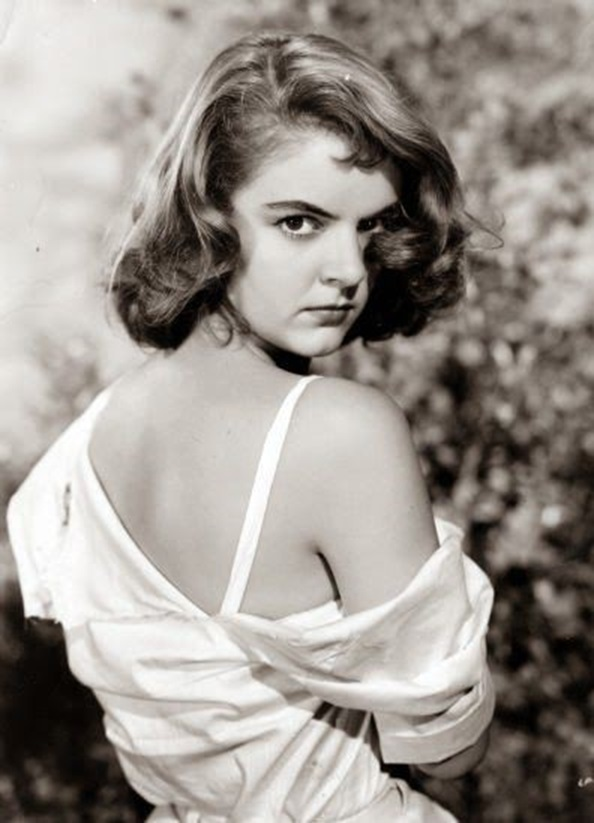
- Studio portrait for Portland Exposé (1957)
- Born: Adele Ruth Crago; October 27, 1934; Valley Stream, New York, U.S.
- Died: December 12, 1970 (aged 36); Culver City, California, U.S.
- Occupation: Actress
- Years active: 1955–1967
- Spouses: Charles E. Graham (m. 1957; div. 1961) Arthur Bryden (m. 1961; div. 1970)
- Children: 1

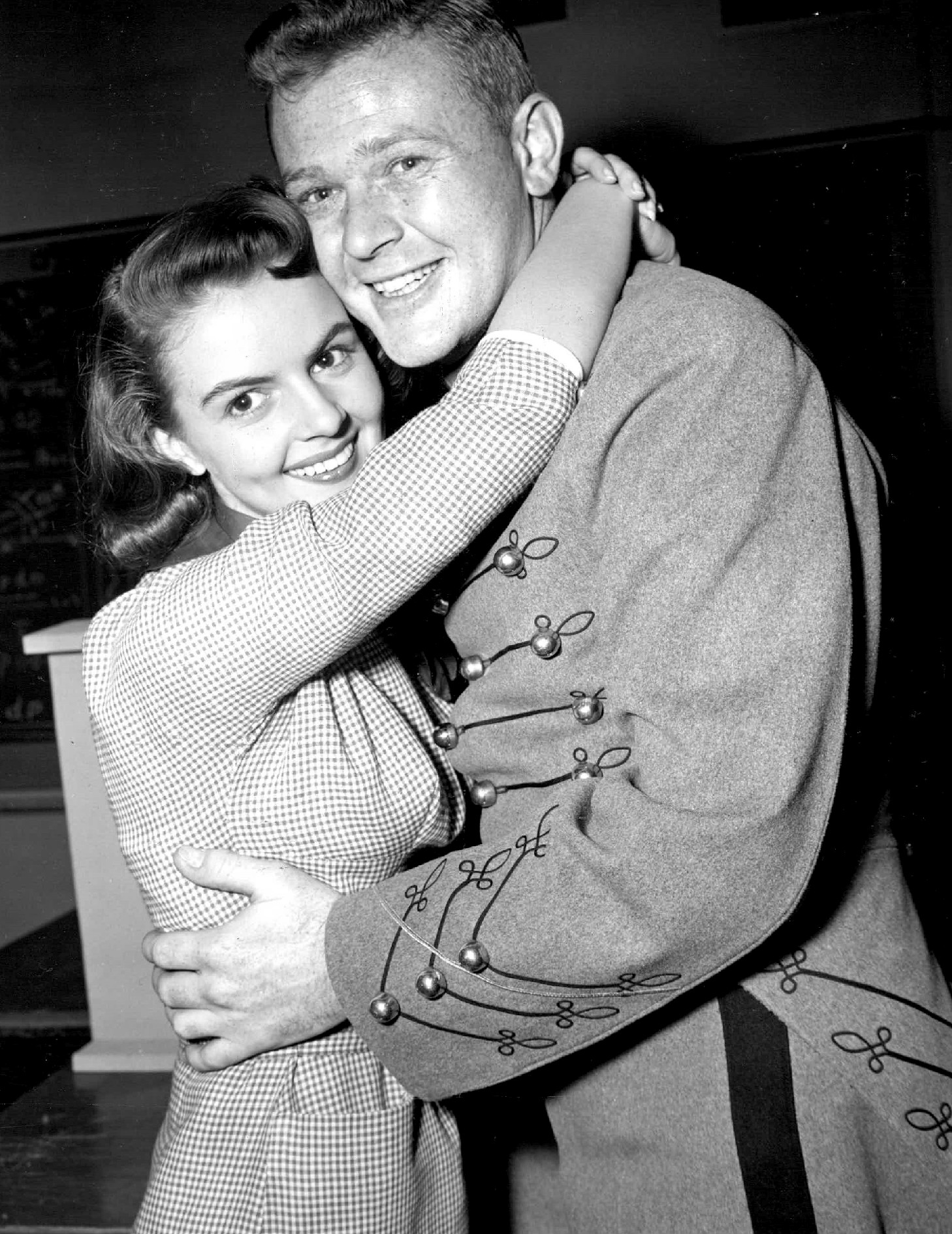
Craig and Martin Milner on TV's The West Point Story (1956)

Carolyn Craig (born Adele Ruth Crago; October 27, 1934 – December 12, 1970) was an American actress who was best known for her performance as Nora Manning in William Castle's 1959 shocker House on Haunted Hill.

== Career ==
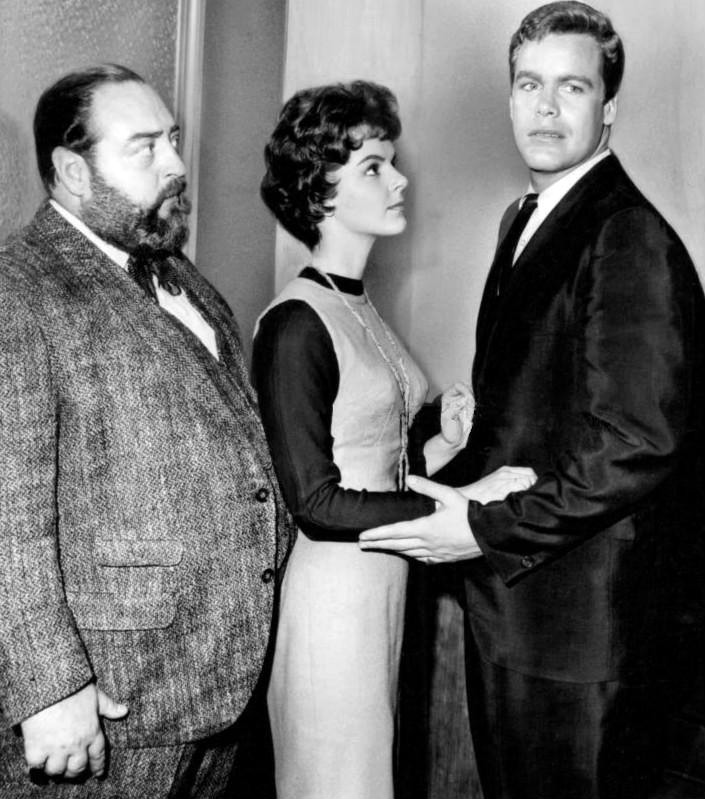
Sebastian Cabot, Craig, and Doug McClure in Checkmate (1962)

Craig gained early acting experience at the Community Playhouse in Santa Barbara, California. She made her film debut in Giant (1956) as Lacey Lynnton. She had a lead role in the 1957 film noir Portland Exposé as Ruth Madison. She was also the second female lead in the 1958 Western Apache Territory.

Sometimes billed as Caroline Craig, she also made numerous guest appearances on television, including a recurring role on the soap opera General Hospital. Craig made a guest appearance on the fourth episode of the television series Perry Mason; she played Helen Waters in "The Case of the Drowning Duck". Craig also made a guest appearance on season 1 episode 3 "End of a Young Gun" of The Rifleman in October 1958, playing Ann Bard, a young woman who sparked the interest of Will Fulton, played by Michael Landon.

On April 8, 1958, Craig was cast as Edna Granger, a young woman with an unrequited romantic interest in deputy Marshal Wyatt Earp in the Western series The Life and Legend of Wyatt Earp.

On April 9, 1962, Craig was cast in the episode "The Fortune Hunter" of the Western series Laramie in the role of Kitty McAllen.

== Personal life and death ==
In 1957, Craig married Charles E. Graham. In 1959, she gave birth to their child, Charles Edward Graham II.

After divorcing Graham in 1961, she married Arthur Francis Bryden, a union that lasted until April 1970. Eight months later, on December 12, Craig died in Los Angeles from a self-inflicted gunshot wound. Her death was not widely reported. She was buried at Inglewood Park Cemetery in Inglewood, California.

== Filmography ==
Year	Title	Role	Notes
1956	Giant	Lacy Lynnton	
1956	Annie Oakley	Della Forsyth	Season 3, Episode 4: "Annie and the Twisted Trails"
1957	Fury at Showdown	Ginny Clay	
1957	A Face in the Crowd	Redheaded Filly	Uncredited
1957	Portland Exposé	Ruth Madison	
1957	Gunsight Ridge	Farm Girl	
1957	Annie Oakley	Penny Granger	Season 3, Episode 33: "Dude's Decision"
1958	Mr. Adams and Eve	Joanie	Season 2, Episode 41: "Teenage Idol"
1958	Apache Territory	Junie Hatchett	
1959	House on Haunted Hill	Nora Manning	
1960	Studs Lonigan	Catherine Banahan	
1961	The Many Loves of Dobie Gillis	Sally Bean	Season 3, Episode 9: "The Second Most Beautiful Girl in the World"
