= Robert Griffin (actor) =

American film and television actor

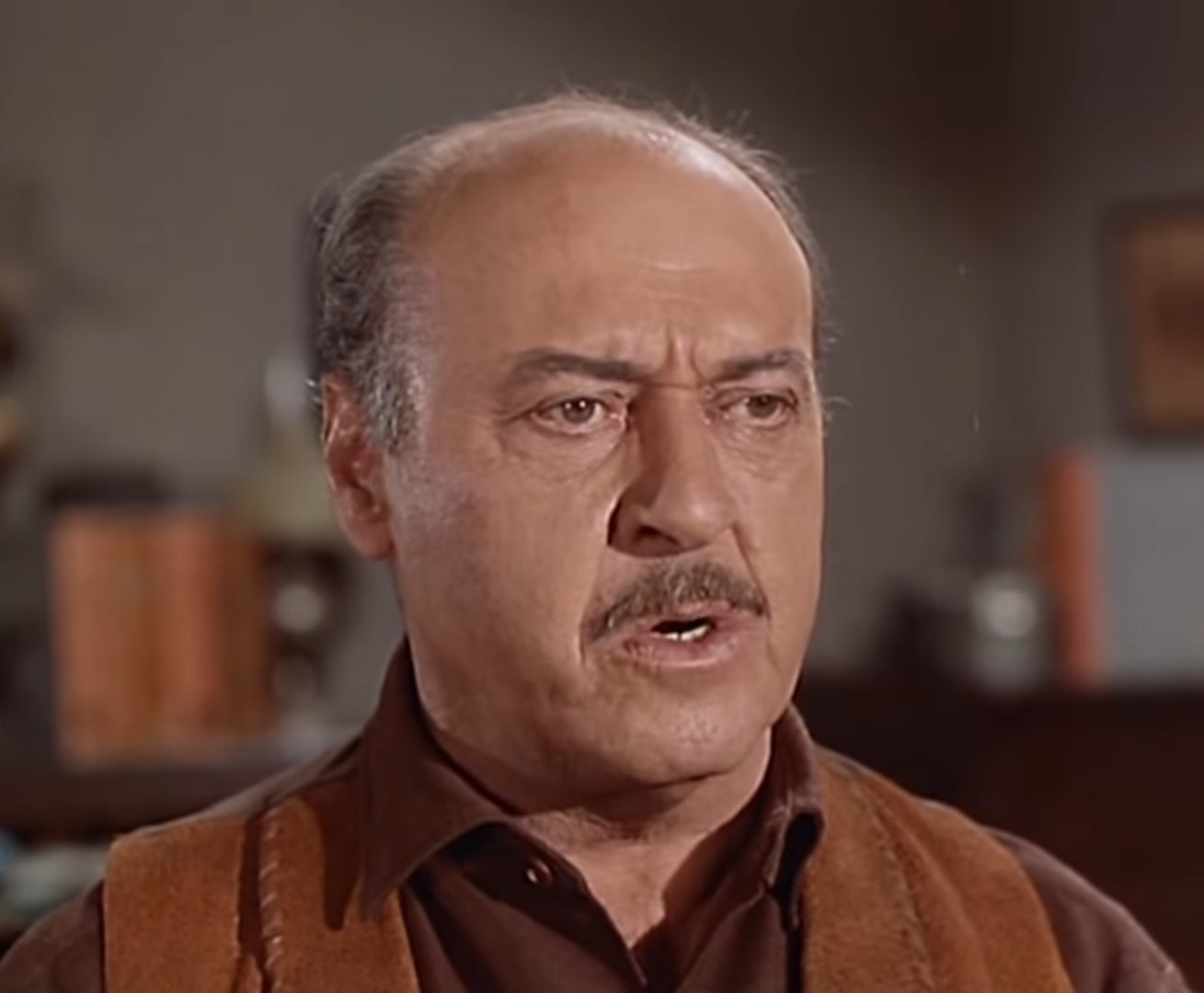
- Griffin in Bonanza, 1960
- Born: July 31, 1902; Hutchinson, Kansas, U.S.
- Died: December 19, 1960 (aged 58); Los Angeles, California, U.S.
- Occupations: Film and television actor
- Years active: 1950–1960

Robert Griffin (July 31, 1902 – December 19, 1960) was an American film and television actor. He appeared in over 100 films and television programs, and was best known for playing Doc Wardrobe in the 1956 film The Brass Legend.

== Partial filmography ==
- Barricade (1950) - Kirby
- Destination Big House (1950) - Police Official (uncredited)
- Broken Arrow (1950) - John Lowrie (uncredited)
- Joe Palooka in the Squared Circle (1950) - Kebo (Crawford Henchman)
- The Magnificent Yankee (1950) - Court Crier (uncredited)
- Vengeance Valley (1951) - Cal (uncredited)
- The Unknown Man (1951) - Reporter (uncredited)
- Indian Uprising (1952) - Dan Avery (uncredited)
- Love Is Better Than Ever (1952) - Mr. Shaw (uncredited)
- Rancho Notorious (1952) - Politician in Jail Cell (uncredited)
- Montana Territory (1952) - Yeager
- Serpent of the Nile (1953) - Brutus
- The Great Jesse James Raid (1953) - Morgan (uncredited)
- Conquest of Cochise (1953) - Sam Maddock
- Slaves of Babylon (1953) - King Astyages
- Gun Fury (1953) - Sheriff of Salt Wells (uncredited)
- The Great Diamond Robbery (1954) - Judge (uncredited)
- The Law vs. Billy the Kid (1954) - L. G. Murphy (uncredited)
- Dragnet (1954) - Chief Special Agent (uncredited)
- The Black Dakotas (1954) - Boggs (uncredited)
- The Human Jungle (1954) - Man (uncredited)
- Bad Day at Black Rock (1955) - Second Train Conductor (uncredited)
- Shotgun (1955) - Doctor (uncredited)
- Inside Detroit (1956) - Hoagy Mitchell
- Please Murder Me! (1956) - Lou Kazarian
- The Ten Commandments (1956) - High Priest (uncredited)
- The Brass Legend (1956) - Doc Ward
- Crime of Passion (1957) - Detective James
- Fury at Showdown (1957) - Sheriff Clay
- Monster from Green Hell (1957) - Dan Morgan
- I Was a Teenage Werewolf (1957) - Police Chief Baker
- Gunsight Ridge (1957) - Herb Babcock
- Pawnee (1957) - Doc Morgan
- The Left Handed Gun (1958) - Morton
- Machine-Gun Kelly (1958) - Mr. Andrew Vito
- The Bravados (1958) - Banker Loomis (uncredited)
- The Badlanders (1958) - Bartender (uncredited)
- "Wanted:Dead or Alive" (TV series 1958) S1 E4 "Dead End" - J. Noonan
- No Place to Land (1958) - Bart Pine
- A Summer Place (1959) - Engelhardt (uncredited)
- Ice Palace (1960) - Engineer (uncredited)
- New Comedy Showcase (TV series, 1960), Season 1 Episode 8: "Waldo"
