= Tyler MacDuff =

American film and television actor

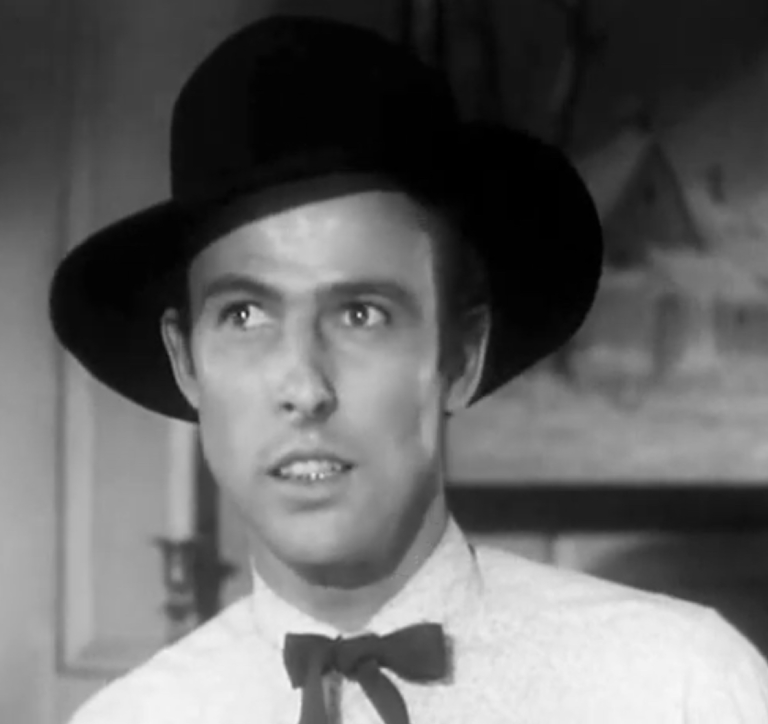
- MacDuff in Stories of the Century, 1954
- Born: Tyler Glenn Duff Jr. September 12, 1925; Hollywood, California, U.S.
- Died: December 23, 2007 (aged 82); Pasadena, California, U.S.
- Education: Pasadena City College
- Occupations: Film and television actor
- Children: 1

Tyler Glenn Duff Jr. (September 12, 1925 – December 23, 2007) was an American film and television actor.

== Life and career ==
MacDuff was born in Hollywood, California. He attended Woodrow Wilson Junior High School. He also attended Pasadena City College, and performed at the Pasadena Playhouse. He served as a director for stage productions. MacDuff began his screen career in 1952, appearing in the film No Room for the Groom, playing an uncredited role of a soldier. In the same year, he appeared in the films Francis Goes to West Point, Son of Ali Baba and Bonzo Goes to College.

Later in his career, MacDuff guest-starred in television programs including Gunsmoke, The Lone Ranger, Laramie, Adventures of Superman, Maverick, The Texan, Tales of Wells Fargo, Lawman, Perry Mason and Death Valley Days. He gained popularity from his role as Billy the Kid in the 1954 film The Boy from Oklahoma, and he played Vance in the film The Bounty Hunter. He played Wes Parker in the 1956 film The Burning Hills, and played Tom Williams in the 1957 film Fury at Showdown.

MacDuff retired from acting in 2003, last appearing in the 2003 film An American Reunion.

== Death ==
MacDuff died on December 23, 2007 of heart failure in Pasadena, California, at the age of 82. He was buried at Riverside National Cemetery.
