= Fay Spain =

American actress (1932–1983)

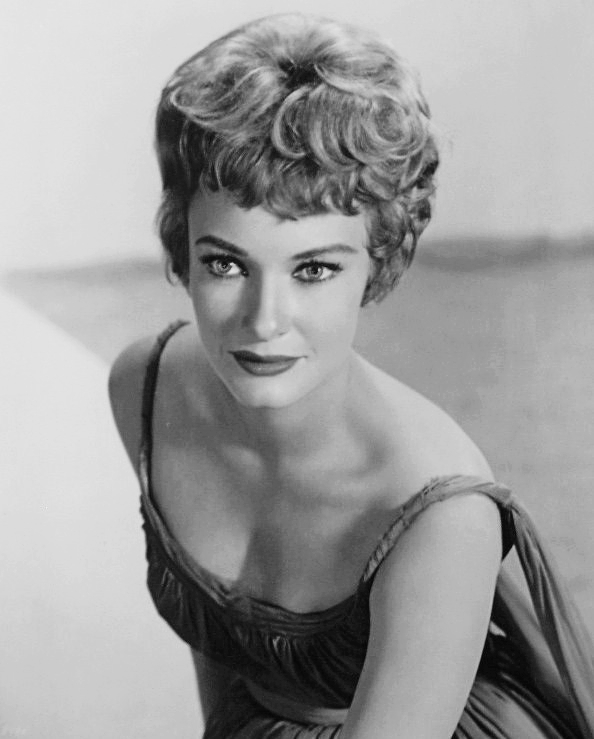
- Spain in 1959
- Born: Lona Fay Spain; October 6, 1932; Phoenix, Arizona, U.S.
- Died: May 8, 1983 (aged 50); Los Angeles, California, U.S.
- Other name: Lona May Spain
- Occupation: Actress
- Years active: 1955–1977
- Spouses: John Falvo (m. 1949; div. 1954) John Altoon (m. 1959; div. 1962) Imo Ughini (m. 1965; div. 1966) Philip Fulmer (m. 1968)
- Children: 1

Lona Fay Spain (October 6, 1932 – May 8, 1983) was an American actress in motion pictures and television.

== Early years ==
Born in Phoenix, Arizona, Fay Spain was the younger of two daughters born to Robert C. Spain and Arminta Frances "Mickie" Cochran. When she was 17 years old, Spain worked as a dealer in a casino in Reno, Nevada. Years later, she said, "I lied about my age and got a job as a dealer – and made big money, much more than my husband, who was a shill."

== Theater apprentice ==
Within two months, she found work with a stock company in the Catskill Mountains. She obtained an Equity card, which enabled her to continue working as an actress. Spain eschewed a college scholarship after attending high school in White Salmon, Washington. She chose instead to pursue a stock company apprenticeship.

== Film actress ==
Spain pursued acting, unimpeded by rejection. She accepted any parts that came along, learning the techniques of the acting trade.

In 1955, Spain was one of 15 actresses who were named WAMPAS Baby Stars. She first came to prominence with movie audiences in the late 1950s. In 1957, she appeared as Carol Smith with John Smith as Tommy Kelly in the dramatic film The Crooked Circle in which a young boxer is pressured to throw a fight. In 1958, she was cast as Darlin' Jill in the film version of God's Little Acre, based on Erskine Caldwell's novel. The film marked the screen debut of Tina Louise and also starred Robert Ryan, Jack Lord, Buddy Hackett, Aldo Ray, and Vic Morrow.

Spain followed this success by playing Maureen Flannery in the film Al Capone (1959), and appeared in such films as The Beat Generation (1959), The Private Lives of Adam and Eve (1960), Hercules and the Conquest of Atlantis (1961), Black Gold (1962), Thunder Island (1963), Flight to Fury (1964), The Gentle Rain (1966), Welcome to Hard Times (1967), and The Todd Killings (1971).

Her final appearance as a film actress came in 1974, when she portrayed the wife of mobster Hyman Roth (Lee Strasberg) in The Godfather Part II (1974).

== Marriages ==
When she was 16, Spain married John Falvo, a screenwriter and actor. They had one son, Jock Falvo (born 1954), and divorced in 1954. In 1959, the actress married West Coast abstract painter John Altoon. From 1965 to 1966, she was married to Imo Ughini, a hairdresser.

== Television ==
Spain starred in 11 episodes of NBC Matinee Theater.

She appeared as a contestant in an episode of the Groucho Marx game show You Bet Your Life (episode #56-02, October 4, 1956, Secret Word 'Hand'). By the middle and late 1950s and 1960s, Spain appeared in Bonanza (Sue Ellen Terry in "The Sisters" in the first season chapter 14), Gunsmoke (in 1957 as the title character "Mavis McCloud" (S3E7) & in 1961 as "Bessie" a gang member and killer in "A Man A Day" (S7E14), Cheyenne, Rawhide, Whirlybirds, Hogan's Heroes, Perry Mason (Charlotte Lynch in "The Case of the Fiery Fingers"), Tombstone Territory (episode "Pick up the Gun"), The Millionaire, M Squad, Adventures in Paradise, The Texan, Riverboat, The Rat Patrol, Gomer Pyle - U.S.M.C., Gunsmoke (episode "Mavis McCloud" (1957) and episode "A Man a Day" (1961)), Playhouse 90, 77 Sunset Strip, Have Gun - Will Travel (episode "High Wire," 1957), Alfred Hitchcock Presents (episode "The Last Dark Step" (1959) and "The Cuckoo Clock" (1960)), Maverick (episodes "The Naked Gallows" with Jack Kelly (1957), "The Goose-Drownder" (1959), and "The Cactus Switch" with Roger Moore (1961)), Pony Express, The Restless Gun, The Fugitive, Bat Masterson and as Angela in Steve McQueen's Wanted: Dead or Alive (Season 2, Episode 18 (1959), as well as the "gold-digging" Amy Williams opposite Royal Dano in Season 2, Episode 3 which aired on 9/18/1959).... starred in 1962 in a Season 6 episode of Tales of Wells Fargo called 'The Angry Sky'.

Spain also appeared on the NBC interview program Here's Hollywood. In the 1950s and 1960s she continued to be seen frequently on television series such as Rawhide episodes, "Incident of the Valley in Shadow" (1959) and "Incident in the Middle of Nowhere" (1961) and "Incident of the Lost Woman" (1962), as well as Stoney Burke, Hogan's Heroes and The Fugitive.

In 1966, she played Calamity Jane in the episode "A Calamity Called Jane" of the syndicated series, Death Valley Days.

== Death ==
Spain died of lymphatic cancer in Los Angeles in 1983 at age 50.

== Filmography ==
=== Film ===
Year	Title	Role
1957	Dragstrip Girl	Louise Blake
1957	The Abductors	
1957	Teenage Doll	Helen
1957	The Crooked Circle	Carol Smith
1958	God's Little Acre	Darlin' Jill
1959	Al Capone	Maureen Flannery
1959	The Beat Generation	Francee Culloran
1960	The Private Lives of Adam and Eve	Lil Lewis / Lilith
1961	Hercules and the Conquest of Atlantis	Queen Antinea of Atlantis
1962	Black Gold	Julie
1963	Thunder Island	Helen Dodge
1963	The Great Space Adventure	
1964	Flight to Fury	Destiny Cooper
1964	Cordillera	
1965	Choque de Sentimentos	
1966	The Gentle Rain	Nancy Masters
1967	Welcome to Hard Times	Jessie
1970	The Naked Zoo	Pauline
1971	The Todd Killings	Mrs. Mack
1974	The Godfather Part II	Mrs. Marcia Roth

=== Television ===
Year	Title	Role	Notes
1955	Big Town		Episode: "Mental Health"
1956	The NBC Comedy Hour		Episode: Season 1, Episode 17
1956	Matinee Theatre		Episode: "Backfire"
1956	Cheyenne	Susan Doonevan	Episode: "The Long Winter"
1956	Conflict	Nancy Meadows	Episode: "The Magic Brew"
1956	Dragnet		Episode: "The Big Beer"
1956	Playhouse 90	Crystal Vail	Episode: "The Big Slide"
1957	Wire Service	Peggy	Episode: "Chicago Exclusive"
1957	Matinee Theatre		Episode: "On the Trail of the Klingsfeld"
1957	The Brothers	Tracey	Episode: "The Crush"
1957	The Web	Sadie	Episode: "Dead Silence"
1957	Gunsmoke	Mavis McCloud	Episode: "Mavis McCloud"
1957	Have Gun – Will Travel	Rena	Episode: "High Wire"
1957	Sugarfoot	Susie Tatum	Episode: "Quicksilver"
1957	Maverick	Ruth Overton	Episode: "The Naked Gallows"
1958	The Restless Gun	Helen Rockwood	Episode: "A Pressing Engagement"
1958	The Court of Last Resort		Episode: "The Court of Last Resort"
1958	Mickey Spillane's Mike Hammer	Trina Greco	Episode: "A Grave Undertaking"
1958	The Millionaire	Aileen Evans	Episode: "The Tony Drummond Story"
1958	Perry Mason	Charlotte Lynch	Episode: "The Case of the Fiery Fingers"
1958	Tombstone Territory	Lisa Carew	Episode: "Pick up the Gun"
1958	Whirlybirds		Episode: "Blind Victory"
1958	M Squad	Ruth Reardon	Episode: "Accusation"
1958	Playhouse 90	Annamay Paul	Episode: "A Town Has Turned to Dust"
1958	Whirlybirds		Episode: "The Midnight Show"
1958	The Texan	Ann Dowd	Episode: "The Easterner"
1958	Pursuit	Andrea	Episode: "The Dark Cloud"
1959	Alfred Hitchcock Presents	Leslie Lenox	Season 4 Episode 18: "The Last Dark Step"
1959	The Ten Commandments		Television film
1959	Bat Masterson	Julie Poe	Episode: "The Tumbleweed Wagon"
1959	77 Sunset Strip	Audrey Franklin	Episode: "Abra-Cadaver"
1959	The Restless Gun	Serena	Episode: "A Very Special Investigator"
1959	Schlitz Playhouse	Anna Carrick	Episode: "Ballad to Die For"
1959	Wanted: Dead or Alive	Amy Williams	Episode: "The Matchmaker"
1959	Adventures in Paradise	Amy	Episode: "Paradise Lost"
1959	Rawhide	Winoka	Episode: "Incident of the Valley in Shadow"
1959	Bonanza	Sue Ellen Terry	Episode: "The Sisters"
1959	Maverick	Stella Legendre	Episode: "The Goose-Drownder"
1960	Wanted: Dead or Alive	Angela	Episode: "Angela"
1960	The Detectives	Marcy Collins	Episode: "House Call"
1960	Markham	Lucille Barrett	Episode: "Deadly Promise"
1960	Laramie	Gloria Patterson	Episode: "Duel at Alta Mesa"
1960	The Alaskans	Janice Collier	Episode: "Peril at Caribou Crossing"
1960	Hawaiian Eye	Honey Shaw	Episode: "Birthday Boy"
1960	The Alaskans	Ellen Hawley	Episode: "The Bride Wore Black"
1960	Alfred Hitchcock Presents	Madeleine Hall	Season 5 Episode 27: "The Cuckoo Clock"
1960	Moment of Fear		Episode: "Fire by Night"
1960	Naked City	Felice Reynolds	Episode: "A Succession of Heartbeats"
1960	Michael Shayne	Marge Jerome	Episode: "Call for Michael Shayne"
1960	Maverick	Angelica Garland	Episode: "Bolt from the Blue"
1960	The Deputy	Sally Tornado	Episode: "Sally Tornado"
1960	Laramie	Fran Ericson	Episode: "No Second Chance"
1960	Riverboat	Laurie Rawlings	Episode: "Duel on the River"
1960	Route 66	Paula Shay	Episode: "A Fury Slinging Flame"
1961	Maverick	Lana Cane	Episode: "The Cactus Switch"
1961	Gunslinger	Martha	Episode: "The Buried People"
1961	Adventures in Paradise	Julie	Episode: "Captain Butcher"
1961	The Untouchables	Julie Duvall	Episode: "Testimony of Evil"
1961	Rawhide	Barbara Fraser	S3:E22, "Incident in the Middle of Nowhere"
1961	Gunsmoke	Bessie	Episode: "A Man a Day"
1962	Cain's Hundred	Enid Lazzo	Episode: "Murder by Proxy: Earl Klegg"
1962	Ben Casey	Lisa Delman	Episode: "Odyssey of a Proud Suitcase"
1962	Dr. Kildare	Sally Winters	Episode: "The Roaring Boy-O"
1962	Hawaiian Eye	Barbara Mason	Episode: "Payoff"
1962	Tales of Wells Fargo	Marie Jarnier	Episode: "The Angry Sky"
1962	Rawhide	Lissa Hobson	Episode: "Incident of the Lost Woman"
1963	Laramie	Gladys	Episode: "Vengeance"
1963	Going My Way	Helen Bancroft	Episode: "The Slasher"
1963	Stoney Burke	Libby Ferris	Episode: "Cat's Eyes"
1963	The Greatest Show on Earth	Alicia	Episode: "The Hanging Man"
1964	Channing	Phyllis	Episode: "Swing for the Moon"
1964	Daniel Boone	Kathleen O'Hannrahan	Episode: "The Sisters O'Hannrahan"
1964	Dr. Kildare	Emily Buchanan	Episode: "Catch a Crooked Mouse"
1965	The Fugitive	Nora Keel	Episode: "Three Cheers for Little Boy Blue"
1966	A Man Called Shenandoah	Millie Turner	Episode: "The Accused"
1966	I Spy	Vanessa	Episode: "It's All Done with Mirrors"
1966	The Rat Patrol	Fay Morgan	Episode: "The Gun Runner Raid"
1966	Death Valley Days	Calamity Jane	Episode: "A Calamity Called Jane"
1967	Iron Horse	Marian Elwood	Episode: "Six Hours to Sky High"
1967	Mannix	Gladys	Episode: "A Catalogue of Sins"
1967	Gunsmoke	Willy	Episode: "Wonder"
1968	Gomer Pyle - U.S.M.C.	Lila St. Clair	Episode: "Gomer and the Queen of Burlesque"
1968	Hogan's Heroes	Myra	Episode: "How to Catch a Papa Bear"
1969	My Friend Tony		Episode: "Kidnap"
1969	Hogan's Heroes	Carla	Episode: "At Last - Schultz Knows Something"
1971	The Man and the City	Lois Niles	Episode: "I Should Have Let Him Die"
1971	Medical Center	Linda	Episode: "The Nowhere Child"
1972	Mannix	Mrs. Welch	Episode: "Cry Silence"
1972	Night Gallery	Molly Mitchell	Episode: "Rare Objects"
1974	Ironside	Alice Schmidt	Episode: "Class of '40"
1974	Police Woman	Mame Dorn	Episode: "Flowers of Evil"
1975	Caribe	Connie James	Episode: "Assault on the Calavera"
1975	Police Woman	Nadine Hummel	Episode: "The Hit"

== Sources ==
- The Fremont Argus, "Fay Spain", May 17, 1975, Page 40.
- Reno Evening Gazette, "Fay Spain Comes Back To Reno", Friday, February 6, 1959, Page 22.
