= The Lawless Eighties =

1957 film by Joseph Kane

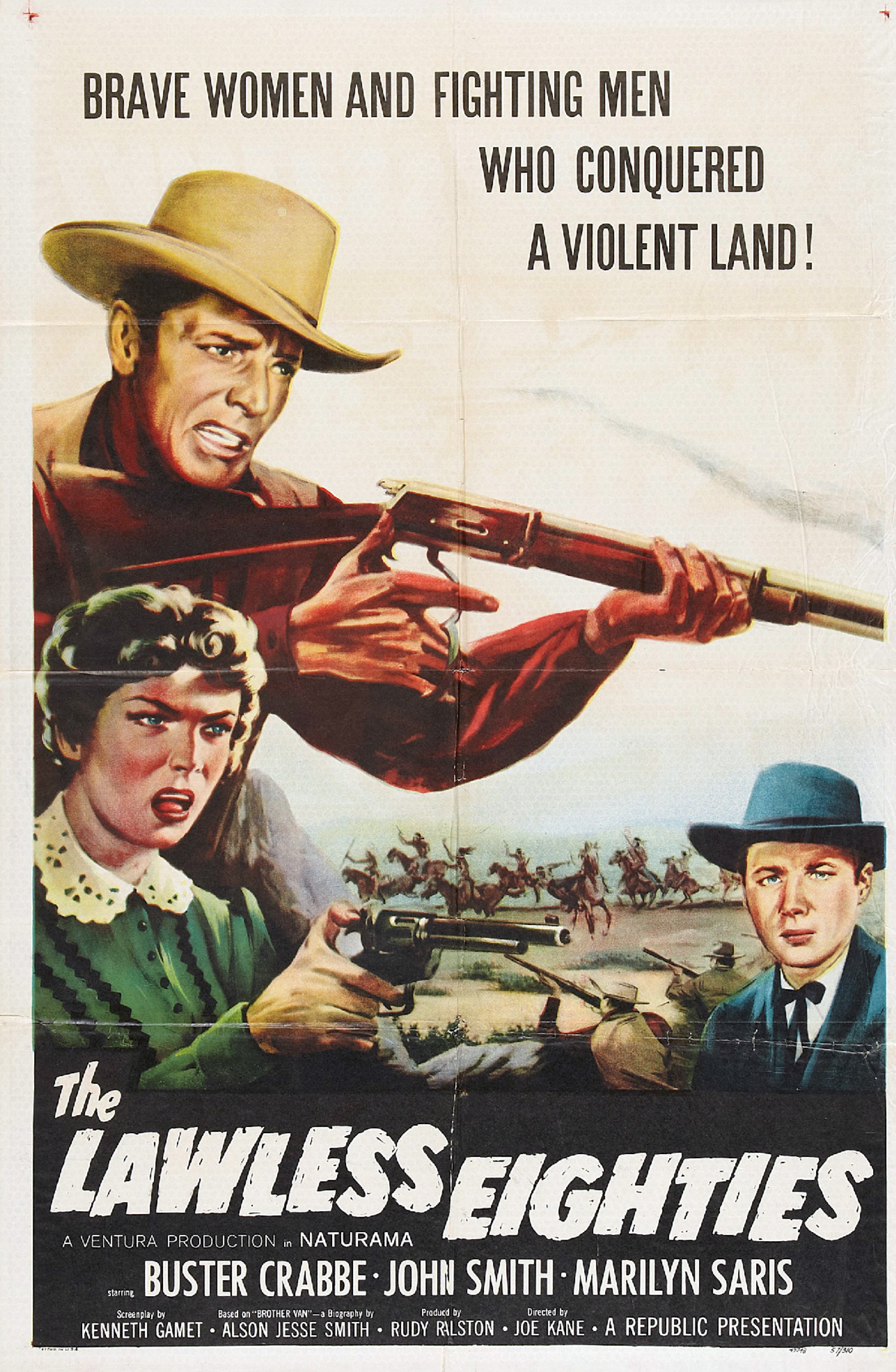
- Theatrical release poster
- Directed by: Joseph Kane
- Screenplay by: Kenneth Gamet
- Produced by: Rudy Ralston
- Starring: Buster Crabbe; John Smith; Marilyn Saris; Ted de Corsia; Anthony Caruso; John Doucette
- Cinematography: Jack A. Marta
- Edited by: Joseph Harrison
- Music by: Jerry Roberts
- Production company: Ventura Pictures Corporation
- Distributed by: Republic Pictures
- Release date: May 31, 1957
- Running time: 70 minutes
- Country: United States
- Language: English

The Lawless Eighties is a 1957 American Western film directed by Joseph Kane and written by Kenneth Gamet. The film stars Buster Crabbe, John Smith, Marilyn Saris, Ted de Corsia, Anthony Caruso and John Doucette. The film was released on May 31, 1957, by Republic Pictures.

== Cast ==
- Buster Crabbe as Linc Prescott
- John Smith as William Wesley Van Orsdel
- Marilyn Saris as Lynn Sutter
- Ted de Corsia as Grat Bandas
- Anthony Caruso as Wolf Chief
- John Doucette as Art 'Pig' Corbin
- Frank Ferguson as Owen Sutter
- Sheila Bromley as Mrs. Myra Sutter
- Walter Reed as Capt. Ellis North
- Harry Lauter as Rancher Andy Bowers(uncredited) plays a good guy this time, and gets shot by John Doucette but lives!
- Robert 'Buzz' Henry as Little Wolf
- Will J. White as Lt. Reed
- Robert Swan as Pete Loman
