= Edward Binns =

American actor (1916–1990)

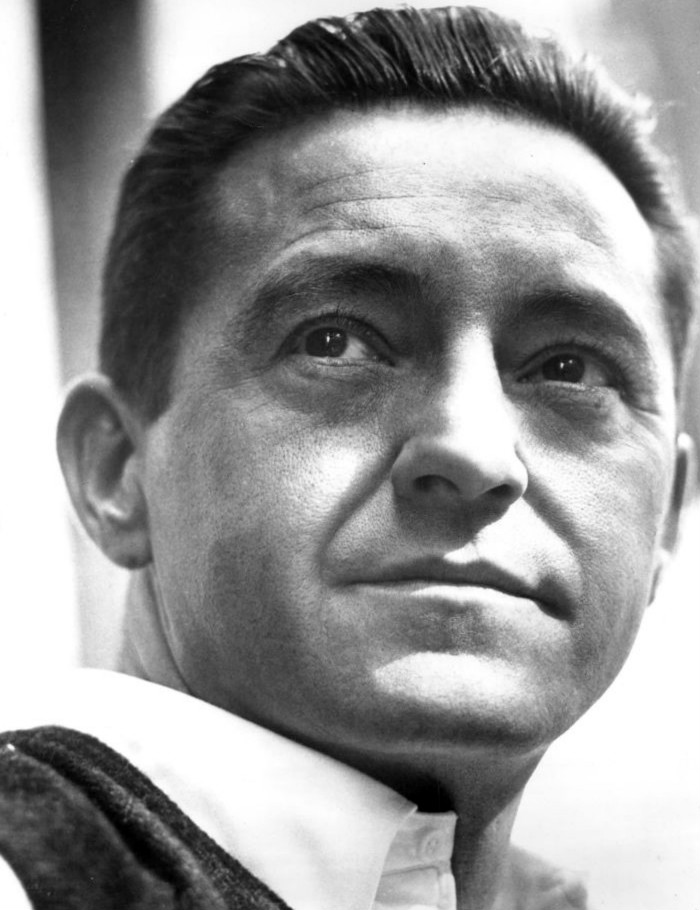
- Binns in 1959
- Born: September 12, 1916; Philadelphia, Pennsylvania, U.S.
- Died: December 4, 1990 (aged 74); Brewster, New York, U.S.
- Occupation: Actor
- Years active: 1948–1988
- Spouses: Marcia Legere (m. 1956; div. 1984); Elizabeth Franz (m. 1984)
- Children: 1
- Military career
- Allegiance: United States
- Branch: United States Army (Army Air Forces)
- Conflicts: World War II; China Burma India theater

Edward Binns (September 12, 1916 – December 4, 1990) was an American actor. He had a wide-spanning career in film and television, often portraying competent, hard working and purposeful characters in his various roles. He is best known for his work in such acclaimed films as 12 Angry Men (1957), North by Northwest (1959), Judgment at Nuremberg (1961), Fail Safe (1964), The Americanization of Emily (1964), Patton (1970) and The Verdict (1982).

== Early life ==
Binns was born in Philadelphia, Pennsylvania, the son of Esther (née Bracken) and Edward Thomas Binns. His family were Quakers. He graduated from the Pennsylvania State University in 1937.

== Career ==
=== Stage ===
Binns's theatrical career began shortly after his 1937 college graduation, when he participated in a repertory theatre in Cleveland. He followed that with a year as actor and director of the Pan-American Theatre in Mexico City. Next, he went to the University of Pennsylvania as an instructor, directing stock theater companies.

One of the first members of the newly formed Actors Studio, Binns began studying with Elia Kazan in late 1947. His Broadway credits include Command Decision (1947), Caligula (1959) and Ghosts (1982).

=== Military service ===
Beginning in 1942, Binns served in the Army Air Forces. After graduating from Officer Candidate School, he was an armament officer in the China-Burma-India Theater.

=== Film ===
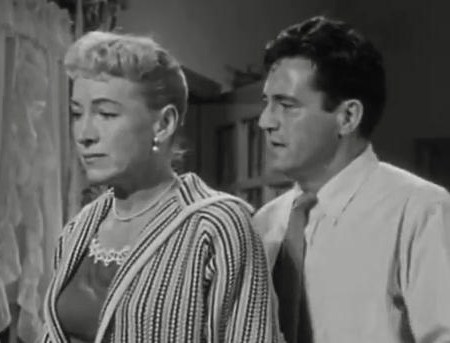
Virginia Gregg and Binns in Portland Exposé (1957)

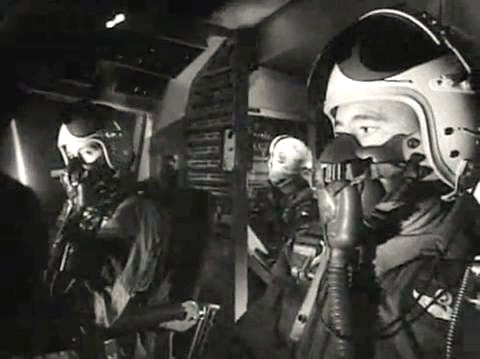
Binns (right) in Fail-Safe (1964)

After appearing in a number of Broadway plays, Binns began appearing in films in the early 1950s. Some of his roles included playing Juror No. 6 in Sidney Lumet's 12 Angry Men (1957) and Lieutenant General Walter Bedell Smith in the Academy Award-winning film Patton (1970) starring George C. Scott.

Binns was featured as a police detective in Alfred Hitchcock's North by Northwest (1959) and played a key role as bomber pilot Colonel Grady in Fail-Safe (1964). His other films include Judgment at Nuremberg (1961), The Americanization of Emily (1964), The Plainsman (1966), Night Moves (1975) and The Verdict (1982).

=== Television ===
Binns starred as Lieutenant Roy Brenner in Brenner, a crime drama on CBS (1959–1962).

He also appeared in "more than 500 television programs, live, taped and film", including NBC's legal drama Justice, Rod Cameron's syndicated State Trooper, the syndicated adventure series Whirlybirds, the ABC/Warner Brothers western series, The Dakotas, the ABC rodeo drama, Stoney Burke, Gunsmoke (in 1957 as "Bill Strapp", a heartless killer in S3E6's "Jesse") and ABC's war drama 12 O'Clock High. He was cast in CBS's Richard Diamond, Private Detective (as Larrabee in the 1958 episode "Pension Plan"), The Investigators and Thriller.

Binns appeared as Colonel Robert Baldwin with June Allyson as his screen wife in the 1961 episode "Without Fear" of Allyson's CBS anthology series, The DuPont Show with June Allyson. Also that year he made two guest appearances on Perry Mason, first as Lloyd Castle in "The Case of the Angry Dead Man", then as Charles Griffin in "The Case of the Malicious Mariner", and in an episode of The Asphalt Jungle. He appeared twice on The Twilight Zone, first in a leading role as Colonel Donlin in the episode "I Shot an Arrow into the Air" (1960) and then in a supporting role as General Walters in the episode "The Long Morrow" (1964). He portrayed a marine biologist obsessed with a whale in the Voyage to the Bottom of the Sea episode "The Ghost of Moby Dick".

Binns appeared in two episodes of ABC's The Untouchables as gunman Steve Ballard and in a later episode as a doctor and also in an episode of Combat!.

He was a cast member of CBS's The Nurses from 1962 through 1964. He appeared in an episode of the ABC espionage drama Blue Light early in 1966, and in ABC's It Takes a Thief (1969–1970) with Robert Wagner. Binns also appeared in one episode of the ABC series A Man Called Shenandoah, with Robert Horton, as General Korshak on CBS's M*A*S*H, in an episode of NBC's The Brian Keith Show, an episode of The Rockford Files, and in three episodes of ABC's The Fugitive. He appeared in the season 5 finale of Hawaii Five-O ("Jury of One") in 1973.

In his 1986 penultimate screen role, Binns guest starred on The Equalizer as Father Martin O'Donohugh in the episode, "Shades of Darkness."

== Personal life and death ==
Binns married journalist Marcia Legere in December 1956. They had one daughter and divorced in 1984. At the time of his death, he was married to actress Elizabeth Franz.

Binns died of a heart attack at the age of 74 while traveling from New York City to his home in Connecticut. His ashes were scattered at his residence.

== Partial filmography ==
- Teresa (1951) as Sergeant Brown
- Without Warning! (1952) as Lieutenant Pete Hamilton
- Vice Squad (1953) as Al Barkis
- Patterns (1956) as Elevator Starter
- The Scarlet Hour (1956) as Sergeant Allen
- Beyond a Reasonable Doubt (1956) as Lieutenant Kennedy
- Alfred Hitchcock Presents (1957) (Season 3, Episode 4: "Heart of Gold") as Mr. Brown
- 12 Angry Men (1957) as Juror No. 6
- Portland Exposé (1957) as George Madison
- Young and Dangerous (1957) as Dr. Price
- Compulsion (1959) as Tom Daly
- The Man in the Net (1959) as State Police Captain Green
- Curse of the Undead (1959) as Sheriff
- North by Northwest (1959) as Captain Junket
- Heller in Pink Tights (1960) as Sheriff Ed McClain
- Desire in the Dust (1960) as Luke Connett
- Judgment at Nuremberg (1961) as Senator Burkette
- A Public Affair (1962) as Senator Fred Baines
- Hemingway's Adventures of a Young Man (1962) as Brakeman
- The Twilight Zone (1964) (Season 5, Episode 15: "The Long Morrow") as General Walters
- Voyage to the Bottom of the Sea (1964) (Season 1, Episode 14: as Walter Bryce)
- Fail-Safe (1964) as Colonel Grady
- The Americanization of Emily (1964) as Admiral Thomas Healy
- The Plainsman (1966) as Lattimer
- Chubasco (1968) as Judge North
- Patton (1970) as Major General Walter Bedell Smith
- Lovin' Molly (1974) as Mr. Fry
- Night Moves (1975) as Joey Ziegler
- Diary of the Dead (1976) as Mr. McNulty
- Oliver's Story (1978) as Phil Cavilleri
- The Pilot (1980) as Larry Zanoff
- The Verdict (1982) as Bishop Brophy
- The Equalizer (1986) ("Shades of Darkness") as Father Martin O'Donohugh
- After School (1988) as Monsignor Frank Barrett (final film role)
