= Gunsight Ridge =

1957 film by Francis D. Lyon

- Theatrical release poster
- Directed by: Francis D. Lyon
- Screenplay by: Talbot Jennings; Elisabeth Jennings
- Produced by: Robert Bassler
- Starring: Joel McCrea; Mark Stevens; Joan Weldon; Addison Richards; George Chandler; Darlene Fields; Slim Pickens; Carolyn Craig; I. Stanford Jolley; Robert Griffin
- Cinematography: Ernest Laszlo
- Edited by: Robert Golden; Ellsworth Hoagland
- Music by: David Raksin
- Production company: Libra Productions Inc.
- Distributed by: United Artists
- Release date: September 1957
- Running time: 85 minutes
- Country: United States
- Language: English

Gunsight Ridge is a 1957 American Western film directed by Francis D. Lyon and written by Talbot Jennings and Elisabeth Jennings. The film stars Joel McCrea, Mark Stevens, Joan Weldon, Addison Richards, Darlene Fields and Carolyn Craig. The film was released in September 1957, by United Artists.

Parts of the movie were filmed in Wildwood Regional Park in Thousand Oaks, California.

== Plot ==
A number of stagecoach holdups have taken place in Arizona Territory. One of them occurs when Mike Ryan, an undercover agent for the stage line, is on board—posing as a paying customer. Another passenger on that trip is the sheriff's daughter, Molly Jones. During the robbery, one of the two bandits lets his bandana slip, revealing his face, which the coach driver recognizes. Because this outlaw's identity is now known, he is killed by his partner, Velvet Clark. In town, Clark is a respectable member of the community who has a mine which barely makes money. He can also play classical music which he does not like anybody knowing about. When the townspeople become fed up with the crime spree, they call for the resignation of the Sheriff, Tom Jones. He asks to be given one more chance and, once granted, deputizes Ryan. Clark's girl, saloon girl Rosa, works out that he robbed the bank, but promises not to tell anyone. Clark thinks of killing her but she tells him that everyone would know it was him so he agrees lets her go. Clark tries to strangle Ryan in the barn but the horses make so much noise he has to leave before he gets caught. Jones finds evidence that implicates Clark. When confronted, Clark kills the sheriff and escapes with money from a train robbery. It is left for Ryan to track down Clark. The two have a showdown at Gunsight Ridge. During the ensuing gunfight, Clark is killed. Ryan returns to the Jones Ranch and expresses regret to Molly for being unable to prevent her father's murder. At the same time, he reveals that he has been offered the job of sheriff and asks her opinion. When she approves, he announces that he will accept the position, implying the two will marry and settle down.

== Cast ==
- Joel McCrea as Mike Ryan
- Mark Stevens as "Velvet" Clark
- Joan Weldon as Molly Jones
- Addison Richards as Sheriff Tom Jones
- Darlene Fields as Rosa
- Carolyn Craig as Farm Girl
- Robert Griffin as Herb Babcock
- I. Stanford Jolley as Billy Daggett
- George Chandler as Gus Withers
- Slim Pickens as Hank Moss
- Herb Vigran as R.B. Davis
- Kitty Kelly as Mrs. Donahue
- Jody McCrea as Groom
- Cynthia Chenault as Bride
- L. Q. Jones as Lazy Heart Ranch Hand
- Morgan Woodward as "Tex"
- Jim Foxx as Lazy Heart Ranch Hand
- Steve Mitchell as Lazy Heart Ranch Hand
- Dan Blocker as The Bartender (uncredited)
