= Pawnee (film) =

1957 film by George Waggner

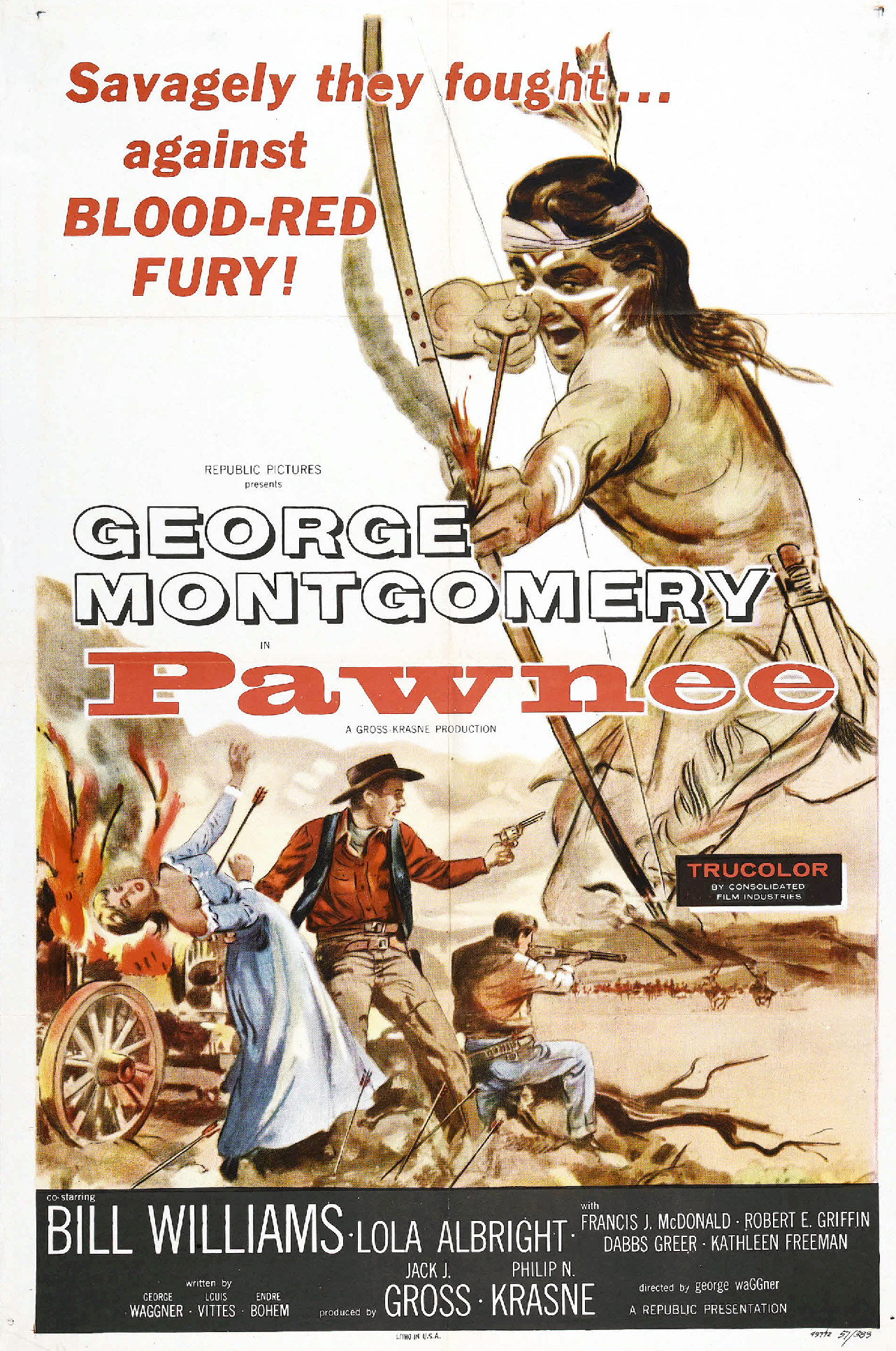
- Theatrical release poster
- Directed by: George Waggner
- Screenplay by: George Waggner; Louis Vittes; Endre Bohem
- Produced by: Jack J. Gross; Philip N. Krasne
- Starring: George Montgomery; Bill Williams; Lola Albright; Francis McDonald; Robert Griffin; Dabbs Greer
- Cinematography: Hal McAlpin
- Edited by: Kenneth G. Crane
- Music by: Paul Sawtell
- Production companies: Gross-Krasne Productions; Hilber Productions
- Distributed by: Republic Pictures
- Release date: September 7, 1957
- Running time: 80 minutes
- Country: United States
- Language: English

Pawnee is a 1957 American Western film directed by George Waggner and written by George Waggner, Louis Vittes and Endre Bohem. The Trucolor film stars George Montgomery, Bill Williams, Lola Albright, Francis McDonald, Robert Griffin and Dabbs Greer. The film, using footage from Buffalo Bill (1944) was released on September 7, 1957, by Republic Pictures.

== Plot ==
Pale Arrow was orphaned as a boy and raised as the son of the Pawnee Chief, Wise Eagle. Now an adult, Pale Arrow witnesses his fellow braves attack a wagon driven by two people who are trying to rejoin the rest of a wagon train passing through Pawnee land. Pale Arrow rescues the two individuals and returns them safely to their comrades. Subsequently, he and Wise Eagle come to an agreement whereby Pale Arrow will see if he is able to return to his roots as a white settler. He takes the name Paul Fletcher and becomes a scout for the wagon train. Wise Eagle wants to live in peace with white people but, upon his death, Crazy Fox becomes Chief and stirs up a desire for war in the Pawnee. Paul Fletcher/Pale Arrow is caught between these two worlds and must choose one when it becomes clear the wagon train is about to be attacked.

== Cast ==
- George Montgomery as Paul "Pale Arrow" Fletcher
- Bill Williams as Matt Delaney
- Lola Albright as Meg Alden
- Francis McDonald as Uncle Tip Alden
- Robert Griffin as Doc Morgan
- Dabbs Greer as John Brewster
- Kathleen Freeman as Mrs. Carter
- Charlotte Austin as Dancing Fawn
- Ralph Moody as Chief Wise Eagle
- Anne Barton as Martha Brewster
- Raymond Hatton as Obie Dilks
- Charles Horvath as Crazy Fox
- Robert Nash as Carter
