= Tomahawk Trail =

1957 film by Lesley Selander

- Directed by: Lesley Selander
- Written by: Gerald Drayson Adams; David Chandler; John Smith
- Produced by: Howard W. Koch
- Starring: Chuck Connors; Susan Cummings
- Cinematography: William Margulies
- Edited by: John A. Bushelman
- Music by: Les Baxter
- Production company: Schenck-Koch Productions
- Distributed by: United Artists
- Release date: February 1, 1957
- Running time: 62 minutes
- Country: United States
- Language: English

Tomahawk Trail is a 1957 American Western film directed by Lesley Selander and starring Chuck Connors.

== Plot ==
During a U.S. Cavalry patrol mission to Ft. Bowie, Lt. Jonathan Davenport, the newly appointed West Point-trained commander of the troop, clashes with his second-in-command, Sgt. Wade McCoy, a seasoned veteran of the "tomahawk trail." Davenport, ignorant of the ways of the West, cloaks his weakness with a mask of arrogance and contempt. Due to Davenport's misjudgment, the platoon loses its ammunition and supply wagons during an attack by the Apache Indians. That night, the Indians return and steal the troop's horses, forcing the men to proceed on foot through the desert to Ft. Bowie.

The men resent Davenport's incompetence and his condescending attitude, and tensions mount when Davenport accuses McCoy of cowardice because of his constant criticisms.

Continuing on, the troop is drawn into a skirmish with a band of Indians, and after driving off the braves, they capture two young women. One is Ellen Carter, the daughter of the commander of Fort Defiance, who was taken prisoner by the Indians after a massacre at the fort. The other is Tula, the daughter of Victorio, the chief of the Apaches. When Davenport, raving from the heat, accuses Ellen of being an Apache squaw and orders both women bound, McCoy rebels and assumes command. Suffering from sunstroke, Davenport then collapses.

That night, Pvt. Barrow, one of the enlistees, attacks Tula, and the sergeant comes to her aid, thus earning Barrow's enmity. Throughout the assault, Tula remains silent, having promised McCoy that she would not cry out and alert the Indians. On the trek back to the fort, Davenport begins to regain his equilibrium, causing McCoy to fear a court-martial, but McCoy's friend, Pvt. Reynolds, assures him that he has done the right thing.

Upon reaching Ft. Bowie, the patrol discovers that the garrison has been massacred. Davenport, raving once again, addresses the dead commander and then collapses, and Miller, his orderly, blames McCoy for his superior's condition. Initially, McCoy decides continue to Fort Benson, but after conferring with his men, he decides to stay and defend the fort.

That night, as Apache drums drone in the distance, Pvt. Macy assaults Ellen and, while defending herself, she kills him. Later, Ellen confides to Tula that she has fallen in love with McCoy and implores her to plead with her father to end the warfare. Soon after, a band of Indians attack and fell Davenport with an arrow.

After McCoy and his men drive off the first wave of Indians, Johnny Dogwood, the troop's scout, listens to the drums and warns that the braves have told Victorio that Tula has defected to the white man. Tula decides to risk her life to meet with her father. As soon as she climbs the fort wall, she is captured by two braves, who take her to Victorio. After hugging his daughter, Victorio calls off the attack and the Indians ride away. Miller then promises to support McCoy at the inquiry, and Ellen and McCoy embrace in relief.

== Cast ==
- Chuck Connors as Sgt. Wade McCoy
- John Smith as Pvt. Reynolds
- Susan Cummings as Ellen Carter
- Lisa Montell as Tula
- George N. Neise as 1st. Lt. Jonathan Davenport
- Dean Stanton as Pvt. Miller
- Robert Knapp as Pvt. Barrow
- Frederick Ford as Pvt. Macy
- Boyd 'Red' Morgan as Trooper (uncredited)
- Eddie Little as Johnny Dogwood

== Production ==
Parts of the film were shot at the Kanab movie fort and Johnson Canyon in Utah.

== Home media ==
MGM's Limited Edition Collection released Tomahawk Trail on DVD in the United States on May 15, 2012.

== Works cited ==
- The Western by Allen Eyles
- Screen World Vol. 9 1958 by Daniel Blum
