= The Crooked Circle (1957 film) =

1957 film by Joseph Kane

- Film poster
- Directed by: Joseph Kane
- Written by: Jack Townley
- Produced by: Rudy Ralston
- Starring: Fay Spain; Steve Brodie; Don Kelly; John Smith
- Cinematography: Jack A. Marta
- Production company: Ventura Pictures Corporation
- Distributed by: Republic Pictures
- Release date: November 11, 1957 (United States)
- Running time: 72 minutes
- Country: United States
- Language: English

The Crooked Circle is a 1957 American drama film directed by Joseph Kane. The film was released in the wide-screen Naturama process by Republic Pictures.

== Plot ==
Before a boxer dies in an accident, he mentions that he should "get lost like Joe Kelly" to sportswriter Ken Cooper. Now curious what became of Kelly, a former contender, Cooper locates him in a remote town where Joe runs a fishing lodge with his brother, Tommy.

Carol Smith, girlfriend of Tommy, immediately urges Cooper to help Tommy get into boxing. Joe is adamantly opposed to this, causing friction between the brothers. Joe finally relents, warning Tommy to change his name and avoid a criminal element.

Al Taylor, an honest trainer, handles the promising Tommy at first, until corrupt manager Larry Ellis, arena owner Max Maxwell and gambler Sam Lattimer sink their hooks into the kid. Tommy begins winning fights and making enough money to buy Carol an expensive engagement ring. He becomes disillusioned only after being told that all his fights were fixed, and that he is expected to deliberately lose the next.

Cooper helps the police expose the racket. When one crook double-crosses another, Lattimer loses $60,000 betting on Tommy to lose. His thugs beat up Joe and kidnap Tommy, preparing to kill him until Cooper and the cops arrive. Cooper's exposé in the newspaper clears Tommy's name, freeing him to marry Carol.

== Cast ==
- John Smith as Tommy Kelly
- Fay Spain as Carol Smith
- Steve Brodie as Ken Cooper
- Don Kelly as Joe Kelly
- Robert Armstrong as Al Taylor
- John Doucette as Larry Ellis
- Philip Van Zandt as Max Maxwell
- Richard Karlan as Sam Lattimer
- Robert Swan as Carl (credited as Bob Swan)
- Don Haggerty as Adams
- Peter Mamakos as Nick
- Charles Sullivan as Bit Role (uncredited)
- Ben Welden as Ring Announcer (uncredited)

== See also ==
- List of boxing films
