= Virginia Gregg =

American actress (1916–1986)

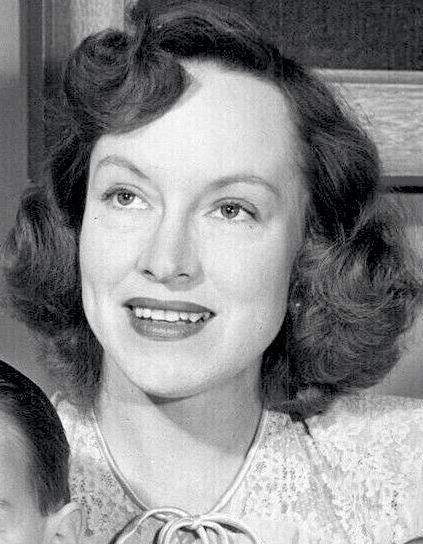
- Gregg in 1951
- Born: Virginia Lee Gregg; March 6, 1916; Harrisburg, Illinois, U.S.
- Died: September 15, 1986 (aged 70); Encino, California, U.S.
- Years active: 1937–1986
- Known for: Love Is a Many-Splendored Thing; Operation Petticoat
- Spouse: Jaime del Valle (m. 1948; div. 1959)
- Children: 3

Virginia Lee Gregg (March 6, 1916 – September 15, 1986) was an American actress known for her many roles in radio dramas and television series.

== Early life ==
Born in Harrisburg, Illinois, she was the daughter of musician Dewey Alphaleta (née Todd) and businessman Edward William Gregg. She had a stepsister, Mary.

When Gregg was five, her family and she moved to Pasadena, California. She attended Jefferson High School, Pasadena Junior College, and Pacific Academy of Dramatic Art.

== Career ==
=== Music ===
Before going into radio, Gregg played the double bass with the Pasadena Symphony and Pops. She was a member of the Singing Strings group heard initially on KHJ in Los Angeles in 1937 and later on CBS and Mutual.

=== Radio ===
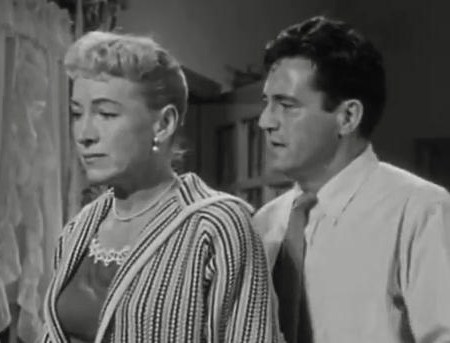
Gregg with Edward Binns in Portland Expose (1957)

Gregg was a prolific radio actress, heard on such programs as The Adventures of Sam Spade; Dragnet; Dr. Kildare; Gunsmoke; The Jack Benny Program; Let George Do It; Lux Radio Theatre; One Man's Family; Yours Truly, Johnny Dollar; The Screen Guild Theater; CBS Radio Mystery Theatre; The Zero Hour; and Mutual Radio Theater.

On the radio series Have Gun–Will Travel (starring John Dehner as Paladin), Gregg portrayed Miss Wong (Hey Boy's girlfriend), and also appeared in very different roles in the concurrent television series with Richard Boone. She had the role of Betty Barbour on One Man's Family and played Richard Diamond's girlfriend, the wealthy Helen Asher, on the radio series Richard Diamond, Private Detective (starring Dick Powell as Diamond). She later guest-starred in an episode of the television version of Richard Diamond, starring David Janssen.

=== Feature films ===
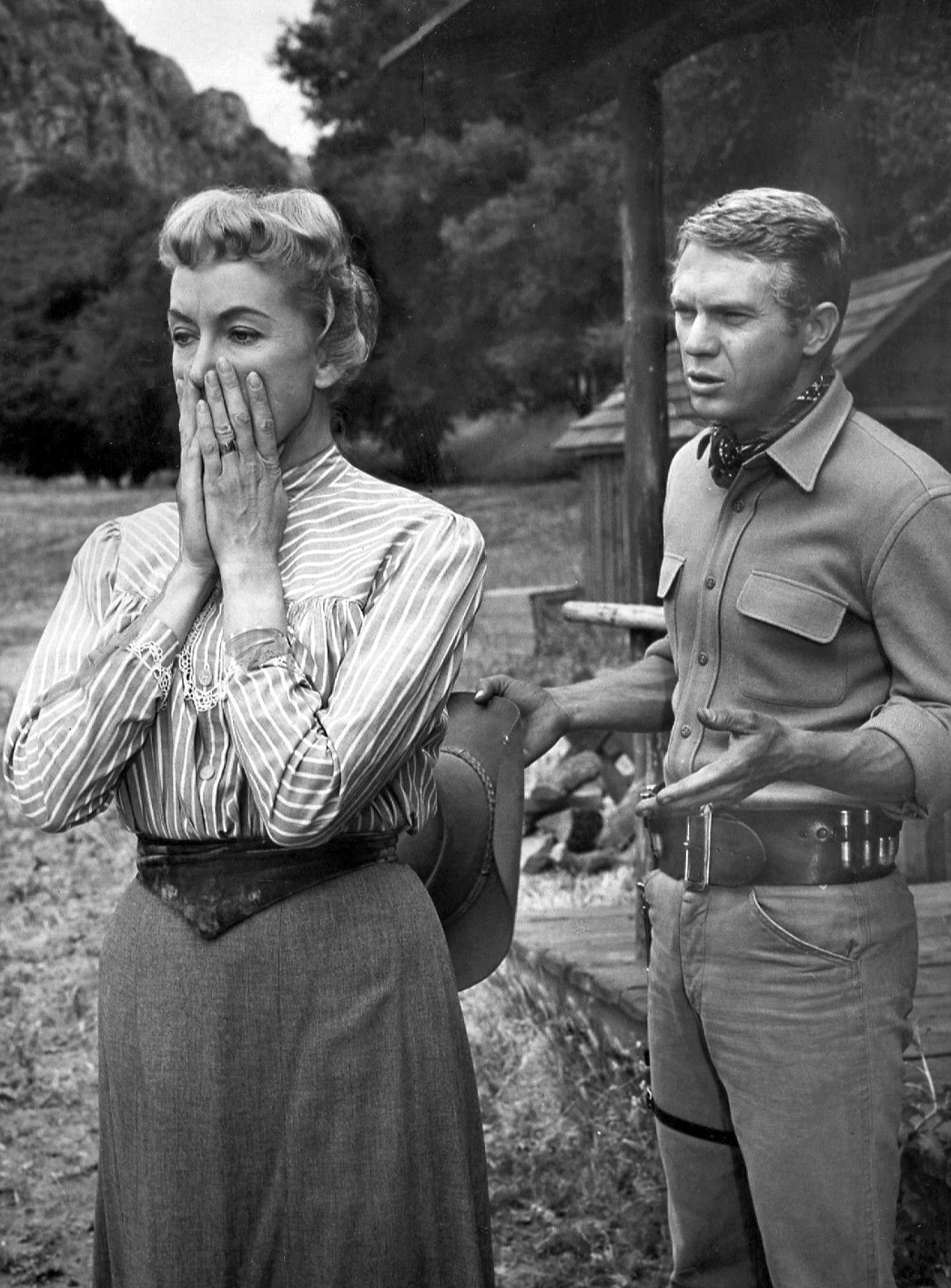
Gregg alongside Steve McQueen in Wanted Dead or Alive (1959)

Beginning with Body and Soul (1947), Gregg made more than 45 films, including I'll Cry Tomorrow (1955), Love Is a Many-Splendored Thing (1955), Portland Exposé (1957), The D.I. (1957), Operation Petticoat (1959), All the Fine Young Cannibals (1960), Man-Trap (1961), House of Women (1962), Spencer's Mountain (1963), Two on a Guillotine (1965), A Big Hand for the Little Lady (1966), The Bubble (1966), Madigan (1968), Heaven with a Gun (1969), Quarantined (1970), A Walk in the Spring Rain (1970), No Way Back (1976), and S.O.B. (1981)

=== Television ===
Gregg once said of her work as a character actress on television: "I work steadily, but I have no identity." She added, "When casting people have a call for a woman who looks like the wrath of God, I'm notified." On television, Gregg appeared in nearly every narrative television series in the late 1950s through the early 1970s, including Bourbon Street Beat, Hawaiian Eye, 77 Sunset Strip, Gunsmoke (murderous and revenge-filled wife Mrs. Tillman in the episode “Joke’s On Us” & title character in S6E30’s “Minnie” in 1961), Bonanza, Lawman, Perry Mason, Maverick, Wanted Dead or Alive, The Virginian, Alfred Hitchcock Presents, Wagon Train, Mannix, Trackdown, Make Room for Daddy, Philip Marlowe, Mr. Adams and Eve, My Favorite Martian, The Twilight Zone, Hazel, The Addams Family, Bewitched, Kung Fu, The Rockford Files, and My Three Sons.

Gregg played a judge in an episode of This Is the Life, in 1964. In 1978, she played the role of herbal healer Ada Corley in a two-part episode of The Waltons titled "The Ordeal". Years earlier, she appeared as school teacher Miss Parker in the film Spencer's Mountain – an earlier adaptation of the Earl Hamner stories on which The Waltons was based. Gregg may be best remembered for her many appearances in Dragnet. Jack Webb used her in dozens of roles on both the radio and TV versions of the show, as well as in the 1954 film version of Dragnet. In later years, she appeared on other shows produced by Webb's production company, Mark VII Limited (e.g. Adam-12 and Emergency!).

=== Voice acting ===
Gregg was the voice for Riabouchinska, the ventriloquist doll, in the 1956 Alfred Hitchcock Presents TV episode "And So Died Riabouchinska". Gregg supplied the voice of Mrs. Bates in Psycho (1960), as did Jeanette Nolan and Paul Jasmin, all uncredited. Only Gregg did the voice in the sequels Psycho II and Psycho III. She voiced Tarra on the 1967 animated TV series The Herculoids. She reprised that role when the series was revived in 1981 as part of the Space Stars animated series.

== Personal life ==
Gregg married producer Jaime del Valle in 1948 (another source says October 15, 1947, in Las Vegas, Nevada). They had three children, Gregg, Jaime, and Ricardo. They were divorced on December 22, 1959.

Gregg was active with Recording for the Blind, making recordings as a volunteer and serving on the group's board of directors.

== Death ==
Gregg died from lung cancer in Encino, California, on September 15, 1986, aged 70.

== Partial filmography ==
- Notorious (1946) – File Clerk (uncredited)
- Lost Honeymoon (1947) – Mrs. Osborne (uncredited)
- Body and Soul (1947) – Irma (uncredited)
- Gentleman's Agreement (1947) – Third Woman (uncredited)
- Casbah (1948) – Madeline
- The Amazing Mr. X (1948) – Emily
- The Gay Intruders (1948) – Dr. Susan Nash
- Flesh and Fury (1952) – Claire (uncredited)
- Dragnet (1954) – Ethel Starkie
- Love Is a Many-Splendored Thing (1955) – Anne Richards
- I'll Cry Tomorrow (1955) – Ellen
- Alfred Hitchcock Presents (1955) (Season 1 Episode 4: "Don't Come Back Alive") - Mildred Partridge
- Alfred Hitchcock Presents (1955) (Season 1 Episode 12: "Santa Claus and the Tenth Avenue Kid") - Miss Clementine Webster
- Alfred Hitchcock Presents (1956) (Season 1 Episode 20: "And So Died Riabouchinska") - Riabouchinska (voice)
- Terror at Midnight (1956) – Helen Hill
- Crime in the Streets (1956) – Mrs. Dane
- The Fastest Gun Alive (1956) – Rose Tibbs
- Alfred Hitchcock Presents (1957) (Season 2 Episode 16: "Nightmare in 4-D") - Norma Parker
- The D.I. (1957) – Mrs. Charles D. Owens
- Portland Exposé (1957) – Clara Madison
- Twilight for the Gods (1958) – Myra Pringle
- Torpedo Run (1958) – Tokyo Rose (voice, uncredited)
- The Hanging Tree (1959) – Edna Flaunce
- Hound-Dog Man (1959) – Amy Waller
- Operation Petticoat (1959) – Major Edna Heywood RN
- Psycho (1960) – Norma Bates (voice, uncredited)
- All the Fine Young Cannibals (1960) – Ada Davis
- Maverick (1961 episode "The Ice Man") – Abbey
- Man-Trap (1961) – Ruth
- Gorath (1962) – (voice)
- House of Women (1962) – Mrs. Edith Hunter
- Lawman (1962 episode "Clootey Hutter") - Clootey Hutter
- Shoot Out at Big Sag (1962) – Sarah Treadway Hawker
- Spencer's Mountain (1963) – Miss Parker, Clayboy's teacher
- Perry Mason (1963) (Season 6 Episode 22: "The Case of the Velvet Claws" - Mrs. Vickers
- Kiss of the Vampire (1963) – Rosa Stangher (US TV version)
- The Alfred Hitchcock Hour (1963) (Season 2 Episode 1: "A Home Away from Home") - Miss Gibson
- The Alfred Hitchcock Hour (1964) (Season 3 Episode 11: "Consider Her Ways") - 3rd Doctor
- The Twilight Zone (1964) (Season 5 Episode 25: "The Masks") - Emily Harper
- The Virginian (1964) (Season 2 Episode 26: "The Secret of Brynmar Hall) – Mrs. Tyson
- The Alfred Hitchcock Hour (1965) (Season 3 Episode 22: "Thou Still Unravished Bride") - Mrs. Essie Setlin
- Two on a Guillotine (1965) – Dolly Bast
- Joy in the Morning (1965) – Mrs. Lorgan
- A Big Hand for the Little Lady (1966) – Mrs. Drummond
- The Bubble (1966) – Ticket Cashier
- Dragnet (1967–1970) - various roles
- Madigan (1968) – Esther Newman
- Heaven with a Gun (1969) – Mrs. Patterson
- The Great Bank Robbery (1969) – Townswoman (voice, uncredited)
- Quarantined (1970, TV Movie) – Nurse Nelson
- A Walk in the Spring Rain (1970) – Ann Cade
- Adam-12 (1970–1975, several episodes) – various roles
- Airport 1975 (1974) – Lily – Passenger (uncredited)
- No Way Back (1976) – Mildred Pickens
- Goodbye, Franklin High (1978) – Nurse
- S.O.B. (1981) – Funeral Home Owner's Wife
- Heidi's Song (1982) – Aunt Dete (voice)
- Psycho II (1983) – Norma Bates (voice, uncredited)
- Psycho III (1986) – Emma Spool (voice, uncredited) (final film role)
