= Sidney W. Pink =

American film director and producer (1916–2002)

- Born: Sidney William Pink; April 6, 1916; Pittsburgh, Pennsylvania, United States
- Died: October 12, 2002 (aged 86); Pompano Beach, Florida, United States
- Occupations: Film director, producer

Sidney W. Pink (1916–2002) was an American film producer and occasional director. He has been called the father of feature-length 3D movies. He is also noted for producing early Spaghetti Westerns and low-budget science-fiction films, and for his role in actor Dustin Hoffman's transition from stage to screen.

== Early life and education ==
Pink was born in Pittsburgh, Pennsylvania in 1916, the second of Philip and Rose (née Ehrenworth) Pink's two sons. After playing the film producer in his high school's production of Merton of the Movies, he realized this was the profession he would ultimately pursue, calling it his life's ambition. Pink earned a degree in business administration from the University of Pittsburgh.

== Film career ==
Pink first worked as a projectionist in a movie theater owned by his wife's family and worked for years building and managing theatres. Sometimes he presented stage shows in cinemas.

In 1937, Pink moved to Hollywood and was hired by Grand National Pictures as production budget manager for the Tex Ritter singing cowboy series. Pink then moved to Columbia Pictures as a budget manager on Lost Horizon and the Jack Holt action films. At that time, Lost Horizon had a budget of $1.25 million for the film, the largest amount ever allocated to a project at that time.

=== World War II and after career ===
During World War II, he served in the Army Transportation Corps and Special Services. After the war, he imported foreign films and produced burlesque shows in downtown Los Angeles with Lili St. Cyr, Joe DeRita and other performers.

=== 3-D film pioneer ===
In 1952, Pink served as associate producer with Arch Oboler, the producer, writer and director of Bwana Devil. The feature-length color film was the first widely-shown 3D film to use the polarized 3D method rather than the red-and-blue-glasses anaglyph 3D occasionally used for short films. It was made using the Natural Vision system, which employed two separate but interlocked cameras and required two specially modified projectors. The film premiered in late November and started a brief but intense 3D fad that peaked in mid-1953, faltered in the fall, rallied, then faded away almost completely during 1954.

=== Bwana Devil ===
Bwana Devil star Robert Stack said he was proud to have starred in Pink's pioneer 3-D production, shot in Hollywood with two large cameras using polarized lenses, one for the left eye and one for the right. Stack said “There was a line 6 feet from both cameras which you were not supposed to cross, otherwise, you’d wind up with that portion of your anatomy projected over the first 10 rows of the audience”. Stack said no one involved with the film knew how audiences would react to the 3-D technique. “Sidney Pink and Arch Oboler and all of us poor innocents were involved in something that we didn’t even know worked or not,” Stack said. “It was a very expensive process, and it took a lot of guts to even do it”. Stack recalled that everyone had their fingers crossed at the first preview. “Over the titles, they had a train that made a long, circling turn and then came directly to the camera. Well, when it came directly to the camera, people began to scream and jumped out of their seats and ran out of the theater. I remember one of the guys saying, ‘Son of a [gun], it really works.’” Stack said “Bwana Devil” was “enough of an eye catcher” to prompt Jack Warner to come out with his own 3D production at Warner Bros. in 1953, “The House of Wax,” starring Vincent Price. “He (Warner) felt this was the coming thing,” said Stack. “Of course, he was not exactly a rocket scientist, and it wasn’t the coming thing”.

In 1989, Pink spoke fondly, recalling the opening week, starting November 30, 1952 of Bwana Devil at the Hollywood Paramount Theater. "They were lined up around the block". "People would come out of the movie and yell, 'Don't go in, it stinks!' But nobody listened and they went in anyway".

=== CineMagic process ===
In 1959, Pink produced The Angry Red Planet, using a new film processing technique he named CineMagic to create an unreal, otherworldly "Martian" effect in some sequences.

=== Foreign productions ===
In 1959, Pink moved his operation to Denmark. Pink's wife Marian Pink, in a newspaper interview, said "At the time it was very difficult to work in any of the [Hollywood] studios because they had union problems and would not accept an independent producer... at that time, they were called ‘the runaway producers".

In 1960, Pink wrote, directed and produced The Greeneyed Elephant for Saga Studios in Denmark. He also co-produced and co-directed the American version of Saga Studios' Reptilicus, a "giant-monster-on-the-loose" film. Pink also wrote, directed and produced Gateway Gaza, filmed in Cairo, Egypt. All three films were released by American International Pictures.

=== Praised Danish animators ===
Pink returned to Hollywood praising Danish animation, saying "Danish miniature work has surpassed that of Japan, up to generally acknowledged to be the finest in the world. Facilities in Denmark, by Hollywood standards, are notably lacking; but fine craftsmen who put everything together by hand are not concerned with the time it takes, (and) are excellent". Pink also said "the Scandinavian countries have never truly been exploited by Hollywood filmmakers, so the settings have remained unusually fresh ground for motion pictures. Reptilicus at Saga Studios in Copenhagen made “at a cost of $380,000 (equivalent to $4,135,546 in 2025), about a third of what it probably would have cost if made in the U. S.".

=== Later films ===
In 1964, Pink turned down an offer to produce A Fistful of Dollars. Pink said "And can you believe it, I turned down the offer to produce A Fistful of Dollars in Spain with Clint Eastwood? That was not one of my better decisions".

In 1965, Pink co-wrote and directed a spaghetti western Finger on the Trigger (also known as Blue Lightning), starring Rory Calhoun. The movie was filmed in Spain. Victor Mature was set to be the movie's star, but he didn't fulfill his contract and did not appear. Pink later sued Mature for $1.1 million dollars.

In 1966, Pink discovered Dustin Hoffman in an off-Broadway stage production in New York City and cast him in Madigan's Millions as a U.S. Treasury agent sent to Italy to recover money that had been stolen by a murdered gangster played by Cesar Romero. The movie was filmed in Italy and Spain and not released until 1969, two years after Hoffman achieved stardom with his role in the 1967 film The Graduate. All told, Pink produced a total of more than 50 films.

=== Movie theatre owner ===
In the early 1970s, Pink built and owned movie theaters in the southeastern United States, including the Bainbridge Triple Cinemas (now the closed Bainbridge Mall Cinemas) in Bainbridge, Georgia, as well as theatres in Puerto Rico and Florida.

== Death ==
Pink died in 2002 at his home in Pompano Beach, Florida, following a long illness.

== Partial filmography ==
- Bwana Devil (1952, dir. Arch Oboler)
- The Twonky (1953, dir. Arch Oboler)
- Flame Over Vietnam (1957, dir. José María Elorrieta)
- The Angry Red Planet (1959, dir. Ib Melchior)
- The Greeneyed Elephant (1960, dir. Peer Guldbrandsen)
- Reptilicus (1961, dir. Ib Melchior)
- Journey to the Seventh Planet (1962, dir. Sidney W. Pink)
- The Castilian (1963, dir. Javier Setó)
- Pyro... The Thing Without a Face (1964, dir. Julio Coll)
- Finger on the Trigger (1965, dir. Sidney W. Pink)
- La llamada (1965, dir. Javier Setó)
- The Drums of Tabu (1966, dir. Javier Setó)
- Seven Vengeful Women (1966, dir. Rudolf Zehetgruber)
- The Treasure of Makuba (1967, dir. José María Elorrieta)
- A Witch Without a Broom (1967, dir. José María Elorrieta)
- The Fickle Finger of Fate (1967, dir. Richard Rush)
- The Christmas Kid (1967, dir. Sidney W. Pink)
- Operation Delilah (1967, dir. Luis de los Arcos)
- The Vengeance of Pancho Villa (1967, dir. José María Elorrieta)
- Bang Bang Kid (1967, dir. Luciano Lelli)
- Madigan's Millions (1968, dir. Stanley Prager)
- 1001 Nights (1968, dir. José María Elorrieta)
- The Emerald of Artatama (1969, dir. José María Elorrieta)
- A Candidate for a Killing (1969, dir. José María Elorrieta)
- The Man from O.R.G.Y. (1970, dir. James Hill)
