= The Treasure of Makuba =

- Directed by: José María Elorrieta
- Produced by: Sidney W. Pink
- Starring: Cameron Mitchell
- Release date: 1967
- Countries: United States; Spain
- Language: English

The Treasure of Makuba, also known as El tesoro de Makuba, is a 1967 Spanish film directed by José María Elorrieta and starring Cameron Mitchell.

== Cast ==
- Cameron Mitchell as Coogan
- Mara Cruz as Maroa
- Jessie Paradise as Mary
- Todd Martin as Hank
- Al Mulock as Pat
- José Luis Lluch as Tony
- Heriberto Pastor Serrador as Duval
- Felix Noble as Chief Maola
- Walter Zamudio as Ling
