= Brigitte Bond =

Transgender ska singer, actress, vedette

Brigitte Bond, also known as Brigitte St. John (born ca. 1944, fl. 1964–1976), was a ska singer, actress and cabaret performer, whose 1964 photo with Prince Buster inspired the Beat Girl logo of ska band the Beat.

== Life ==
Press often described her as either French (from Marseille) or Maltese; in one interview Brigitte claimed she had an Italian mother, French father and had been born in Malta. In 1964 the 19-year-old Brigitte Bond debuted as a singer at The 2i's Coffee Bar, where she was scouted by and signed under Tom Littlewood. She released a 45 rpm single with songs "Blue Beat Baby" and "Oh Yeah Baby" with a backing band named the Bluebeats. On 25 February 1964, Brigitte with other fans was at the Heathrow Airport to welcome Prince Buster to England, and the famous photo of the two dancing the twist was taken. In April she performed at The Flamingo Club. In May she met Sir John Waller, who instantly proposed to her and quickly announced the engagement in the press. The arrangement was soon called off when Waller learned that as a trans woman Brigitte could not bear him an heir (required for him to access his full inheritance). Brigitte continued with her career, performing at the Astor Club and switching management to Arthur Lowe Agency. After a short tour of Africa (Kenya and Rhodesia) Brigitte performed at the Pelican Club in Soho, until it was raided for nude dancers (Brigitte being described in the press as "the worst" offender). In 1965 Bond made another African tour (South Africa and Rhodesia), and then moved to Francoist Spain for a residency in Madrid.

On 17 June 1965 Brigitte caused a commotion during Billy Graham's visit in Soho by climbing on a car and protesting his teachings on sinfulness of miniskirts. This earned her a spot on The Sunday Mirror front page.

Around 1967 she took up acting under the name Brigitte St. John. She claimed that she was in the 1967 Casino Royale; however, she is not credited there. She played a dancer role in Herostratus the same year, and after moving to Spain starred in two more films in 1968 and 1969.

In Spain Brigitte focused on cabaret performances, becoming a supervedette. She performed with Coccinelle in June 1968, and in 1974 with Paco España at Gay Club, Madrid's first LGBT club.

In an April 1976 interview in the Spanish press, Bond revealed that she was married and living in Italian Campania, and that her real name was Giovanna. After that date she has not made any public appearances and her further life is unknown.

== Legacy ==
Melody Maker included the 1964 photograph of Bond and Prince Buster in a 1979 article on the history of ska. When ska band the Beat requested a band logo from Hunt Emerson for their first album, he created the character of The Beat Girl referencing this photograph.

== Discography ==
- Brigitte Bond and the Bluebeats. "Blue Beat Baby"/"Oh Yeah Baby" single, 1964, Blue Beat Records

== Filmography ==
- Herostratus. With Brigitte St. John as dancer. UK, 1967.
- 1001 Nights. With Brigitte St. John as dancer. Spain & Italy, 1968.
- The Emerald of Artatama. With Brigitte St. John as Brigitte. Spain, 1969.

== Sources ==
- Wallace, Joanna (2022-09-03). "Blue Beat Baby: The Untold Story of Brigitte". YouTube.
- “The King and Queen of Blue Beat meet”. Daily Mirror, 26 February 1964: 26.
- David Hunn. “Brigitte Bond: She has a built-in licence to thrill”. Tit-Bits, 9 May 1964: 13.
- “I’ll be Lady Waller in 4 Months says Brigitte”. The Evening Standard, 21 May 1964.
- “Where Boys Were”. Madera Tribune, 73,20, 10 June 1964, p3. Online
- “The Stripper who cried for shame”. Daily Mirror, November 14, 1964: 3.
- Brigitte St John. “Sin and Mini Skirts”. Sunday Mirror,June 19, 1966 p1.
- “The Story of Ska”. Melody Maker, May 19, 1979.
