= John Acheson =

John Acheson may refer to:

- John Acheson (actor) (1934–1997), British actor
- John Acheson (goldsmith) (fl. 1560–1581), Scottish goldsmith
