= Esperanza Roy =

Spanish actress

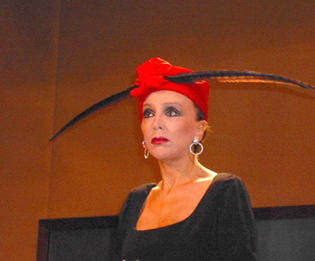
- Roy in 2001
- Born: Esperanza Fuentes Roy; November 22, 1935 (age 90); Madrid, Spain
- Occupation: Actress
- Years active: 1953–2010

Esperanza Fuentes Roy (born 22 November 1935) is a Spanish actress.

== Career ==
Roy began acting with revue shows before she debuted in film in 1962. Prior to acting, Roy had trained professionals as a dancer. In the 1970s, Roy would appear in several horror films, including Jesús Franco's thriller X-312: Flight to Hell (1971), A Candle for the Devil (1973) opposite Aurora Bautista and Judy Geeson, the zombie film Return of the Blind Dead (1973) and erotic movie La Zorrita en Bikini (1976), directed by Ignacio F. Iquino.

== Personal life ==
Her husband is the Basque film director Javier Aguirre Fernández.

== Filmography ==
- El comisario (2008) TV
- Corazón en sombras (2008)
- Vete de mí (2006)
- Medea 2 (2006)
- X (2002)
- Zero/infinito (2002) (voice)
- Paraíso (2001) TV
- Ella no está sola (1998)
- La novia de medianoche (1997)
- Perdona bonita, pero Lucas me quería a mí (1997)
- Casa para dos (1995) TV
- Chechu y familia (1992)
- El Quijote de Miguel de Cervantes (1991) TV
- El amor sí tiene cura (1991)
- Divinas palabras (1987)
- El edén (1987) TV
- La monja alférez (1987)
- La voz humana (1986) TV
- Por la calle de Alcalá (1986) TV
- La comedia musical española (1985) TV
- A la pálida luz de la luna (1985)
- La comedia (1984) TV
- La zorra y el escorpión (1984)
- El jardín de Venus (1983) TV
- Vida/Perra (1982)
- Bésame, tonta (1982)
- Puente aéreo (1981)
- El lobo negro (1981)
- Duelo a muerte (1981)
- El alcalde y la política (1980)
- Memorias de Leticia Valle (1980)
- Tú estás loco Briones (1980)
- Compañero de viaje (1979)
- Tigre (1979)
- Mi adúltero esposo (1979)
- El hotel de las mil y una estrellas (1979) TV
- El sacerdote (1978)
- La classe (1978)
- Carne apaleada (1978)
- Gusanos de seda (1977)
- Ellas los prefieren...locas (1977)
- Caperucita y Roja (1977)
- El libro del buen amor II (1976)
- La zorrita en bikini (1976)
- La hora de... (1975) TV
- Sergeant Berry (1975) TV
- Ligeramente viudas (1975)
- Noche de teatro (1974) TV
- Dormir y ligar: todo es empezar (1974)
- Una mujer prohibida (1974)
- Mi hijo no es lo que parece (1974)
- El insólito embarazo de los Martínez (1974)
- Las señoritas de mala compañía (1973)
- Un casto varón español (1973)
- Return of the Blind Dead (1973) aka Return of the Evil Dead
- A Candle for the Devil (1973)
- Guapo heredero busca esposa (1972)
- La garbanza negra, que en paz descanse... (1972)
- Secuestro a la española (1972)
- Los novios de mi mujer (1972)
- Blanca por fuera y Rosa por dentro (1971)
- X312 - Flight to Hell (1971)
- El sobre verde (1971)
- El jardín de las delicias (1970)
- El cronicón (1970)
- Las siete vidas del gato (1970)
- Estudio amueblado 2.P. (1969)
- ¿Por qué te engaña tu marido? (1969)
- The Emerald of Artatama (1969)
- Por qué pecamos a los cuarenta (1969)
- Cuentos y leyendas (1968) TV
- Si volvemos a vernos (1968)
- Pecados conyugales (1968)
- A Witch Without a Broom (1967)
- ¿Qué hacemos con los hijos? (1967)
- El cálido verano del Sr. Rodríguez (1965)
- Destino: Barajas (1965)
- Dos chicas locas, locas (1965)
- Relevo para un pistolero (1964)
- Bella, la salvaje (1953)
