= The Fickle Finger of Fate =

1967 American film

- DVD cover
- Directed by: Richard Rush
- Written by: Jim Henaghan; Aurelio López Monis
- Produced by: Sidney W. Pink
- Starring: Tab Hunter; Pedro Marí Sanchez; Luis Prendes; Gustavo Rojo; Elsa Skolinstad
- Cinematography: Antonio Macasoli
- Edited by: John Horvath
- Music by: Gregorio García Segura
- Distributed by: Producer's Releasing Corporation
- Release date: 1967
- Running time: 90 minutes
- Countries: Spain; United States
- Languages: Spanish; English

The Fickle Finger of Fate (also known as El Dedo del destino and The Cup of St. Sebastian) is a 1967 comedy film directed by Richard Rush, produced by Sidney W. Pink, and starring Tab Hunter. Hunter stars as a clumsy businessman who accidentally gets wrapped up in a plot of intrigue while on a trip to Spain.

== Cast ==
- Tab Hunter as Jerry
- Luis Prendes as Winkle
- Gustavo Rojo as Estrala
- Fernando Hilbeck as Fuentes
- Ralph Brown as Jaffe
- Pedro Marí Sanchez as Paco
- Elsa Skolinstad as Inger
- Patty Shepard as Pilar

== Release ==
The film was distributed on DVD in America by Troma Entertainment.

== See also ==
- List of American films of 1967
