= Salih Güney =

Turkish actor

Salih Güney (born January 1, 1945) is a Turkish film actor.

== Biography ==
Salih Güney was born in Adana in 1945. His father was a Circassian. Güney graduated in theatre from the republican conservatory of Ankara. He made his film debut in Haldun Dormen's Bozuk Düzen. He has gone on to act in over 150 films and series.

He started acting professionally on stage and in movies when he was only 19 years old. He is considered the 'James Dean' of Turkey, a rebellious and attractive star of the Turkish movies. In 1969, at age 25, he stopped acting on stage, not because he wanted to, but because the producers said that with all his work on the stage, he would not get a great part in movies.

In that same year, he starred in the 1970 Columbia Pictures movie, You Can't Win 'Em All with Tony Curtis, Charles Bronson and Michèle Mercier. After this production he went to Sweden and England to develop his skills behind the camera. He moved to the United States and became a US citizen.

He now lives in Europe and still appears on TV regularly. Besides acting, he avidly pursues his hobby of archeology. He strongly supports the idea that archeological artifacts from Turkey stay in Turkey and fought for bringing back the stolen sculpture of Heracles, which appeared in a private collection in the USA.

He has two daughters.

== Filmography ==
- 1965: Kelepçeli bilekler
- 1965: Korkusuz yaşayanlar
- 1965: Şehvetin esiriyiz
- 1965: Yasak sokaklar
- 1965: Yıldız Tepe
- 1966: Çıtkırıldım
- 1966: İntikam Fırtınası
- 1966: Bozuk düzen
- 1966: Çılgın gençlik
- 1966: Dört Kurşun
- 1966: Fedailer
- 1966: Garibim Çalıkuşu
- 1966: Günah çocuğu
- 1966: İbrahim Ethem ilahi davet
- 1966: Kanunsuz dağlar
- 1966: Karacaoğlan
- 1966: O kadın
- 1966: Yiğitler ölmezmiş
- 1967: Ağlayan Kadın
- 1967: Bir şoförün gizli defteri
- 1967: Çıldırtan Arzu
- 1967: Efenin İntikamı
- 1967: Hırçın Kadın
- 1967: İmamın Gazabı
- 1967: Mühür Gözlüm
- 1967: Nemli Gözler
- 1967: Söyleyin genç kızlara
- 1967: Utanç Kapıları
- 1967: Zalimler de sever
- 1967: Demir Kapı
- 1968: Ağlayan bir ömür
- 1968: Aşk eski bir yalan
- 1968: Funda
- 1968: Karanlık Yollar
- 1968: İstanbul'da Cümbüş Var
- 1969: Sevgili Babam
- 1969: İki yetime
- 1969: Mısır'dan gelen gelin
- 1969: Ölümsüzler
- 1969: Tatlı Sevgilim
- 1969: Sevgili Babam
- 1970: Aşktan da Üstün
- 1970: You Can't Win 'Em All
- 1970: Ah Müjgan Ah
- 1970: Ayşecik - Sana tapıyorum
- 1970: Birleşen Yollar
- 1970: Ceylan Emine
- 1970: Firari Aşıklar
- 1970: Güller ve Dikenler
- 1970: Ölünceye Kadar
- 1970: Pamuk Prenses ve 7 cüceler
- 1970: Talihsiz Baba
- 1971: Altın prens devler ülkesinde
- 1971: Aşk Hikâyesi
- 1971: Binbir gece masalları
- 1971: Bir genç kızın romanı
- 1971: İki ruhlu kadın
- 1971: Korkusuz Kaptan Swing - (Kaptan Swing)
- 1971: Saraylar Meleği
- 1971: Seks Fırtınası
- 1971: Yedi Kocalı Hürmüz
- 1971: Ölümsüzler
- 1972: Acı Pirinç
- 1972: Ah koca dünya
- 1972: Asi Gençler
- 1972: Benimle sevişir misin?
- 1972: Dinmeyen Sızı
- 1972: Kanun Adamı
- 1972: Suya düşen hayal
- 1973: Aşk Mahkûmu
- 1973: Gülerken Ağlayanlar
- 1974: Arap Abdo
- 1974: Sen Aşk Nedir Bilirisin
- 1974: Niyet
- 1974: Kahramanlar
- 1974: Sayılı Kabadayılar
- 1974: Göç
- 1974: Sabıkalı
- 1975: Şaşkın Damat
- 1975: Çirkef
- 1975: Hasan Almaz Basan Alır
- 1975: Kahramanlar
- 1976: Öleyise Sevmek
- 1976: Aman Karım Duymasın
- 1976: Deli Gibi Sevdim
- 1977: Aşk Dediğin Laftır
- 1977: İkimizde Sevdik
- 1977: Enayiler Kralı
- 1977: Öl Seve Seve
- 1977: On Çok Çok İyi
- 1978: Sen Aşk Nedir Bilir Misin
- 1978: Kanlı Hayat
- 1978: Vahşi ve Tatlı
- 1978: Kendin Pişir Kendin Ye
- 1978: Güneşten de Sıcak
- 1978: Antika Karyola
- 1979: Onsuz Olamam
- 1979: Can Hatice
- 1979: Ali Baba'nın Çiftliği
- 1979: Beni Mahvettiler
- 1983: Zifaf
- 1983: Çelik Mezar
- 1983: Haram
- 1983: Çelik Mezar
- 1984: Zifaf
- 1984: Günahkar
- 1984: Kızgın Güneş
- 1984: Yangın
- 1984: Darbe
- 1986: Al Dudaklım
- 1986: Sıcak Geceler
- 1987: Afrodit
- 1989: Arkadaşım ve Ben
- 1990: Haciz Kararı
- 1993: Gecem ve Gündüzüm
- 1994: Günah Tohumu
- 1996: Otostop
- 2006: Beyza'nın Kadınları
- 2011: Takım: Vatan Sana Canım Feda
- 2020: Yalancı Sevgilim
- 2023: Aferez

=== Series ===
- 1975: Aşk-ı Memnu
- 1987: Mesela Muzaffer
- 1996: Kaldırım Çiçeği
- 2002: Kardelen
- 2003: Serseri Aşıklar
- 2003: Tatlı Hayat
- 2004: Dönme Dolap
- 2005: Belalı Baldız
- 2009: Altın Kızlar
- 2009: Bu Kalp Seni Unutur mu?
- 2009: Kül ve Ateş
- 2014: Aramızda Kalsın
