= Two Crosses at Danger Pass =

1967 film by Rafael Romero Marchent

- Spanish: Dos cruces en Danger Pass
- Italian: Due croci a Danger Pass
- Directed by: Rafael Romero Marchent
- Screenplay by: Enzo Battaglia; Eduardo Manzanos
- Story by: Enzo Battaglia
- Produced by: Fulvio Lucisano; Eduardo Manzanos Brochero
- Cinematography: Emilio Foriscot; Sergio Martinelli
- Edited by: Antonio Jimeno
- Music by: Francesco De Masi
- Production companies: Copercines, Cooperativa Cinematográfica; United Pictures
- Distributed by: Paradise Film Exchange; Sánchez Ramade; Wild East Productions
- Release date: 28 March 1967
- Running time: 92 min
- Country: Spain

Two Crosses at Danger Pass (Spanish: Dos cruces en Danger Pass and Italian: Due croci a Danger Pass) is a 1967 Spanish western film directed by Rafael Romero Marchent. It is produced by Eduardo Manzanos Brochero, written by Enzo Battaglia, Eduardo Manzanos and Gianlorenzo Battaglia, and starring Pietro Martellanza, Mario Novelli and Mara Cruz. It is scored by Francesco De Masi.

== Cast ==
- Pietro Martellanza as Alex Mitchell
- Mara Cruz as Judy Mitchell
- Luis Gaspar as Mark
- Anthony Freeman as Charlie Moran
- Miguel S. del Castillo as Powell
- Emilio Rodríguez as Johnny Miller
- Dianik as Gloria Moran
- Eduardo Coutelenq
- Nuccia Cardinali as Edith
- Antonio Pica as Sheriff Doug
- Cris Huertas as Loud Drunk
- Xan das Bolas as Bartender
- Jesús Puente as Sheriff T. Mitchell
- Armando Calvo as Old Moran
- July Ray as Saloon Singer
