= The University Chorus =

- Directed by: José María Elorrieta
- Written by: José Luis Navarro; Juan Antonio Verdugo; José María Elorrieta; José Manuel Iglesias
- Produced by: Elena Espejo
- Cinematography: Alfonso Nieva
- Edited by: Antonio Gimeno
- Music by: Martínez Llorente
- Production company: Espejo Films
- Distributed by: Cire Films
- Release date: 16 May 1960
- Running time: 97 minutes
- Country: Spain
- Language: Spanish

The University Chorus (Spanish: Pasa la tuna) is a 1960 Spanish musical film directed by José María Elorrieta.

== Cast ==
- Mara Cruz as María
- José Luis
- Celia Conde
- Manolo Gómez Bur as Tristán Villasante
- Ángel de Andrés as Tomás González
- José María Tasso as Pacífico
- María Esperanza Navarro
- Antonio Almorós
- Ignacio de Paúl
- Beni Deus
- Rafael Corés
- Mario Moreno
- Alfonso Rojas
- José Villasante
- José Riesgo
- Gonzalo Medel
- Rafael Puerta

== Bibliography ==
- Bentley, Bernard. A Companion to Spanish Cinema. Boydell & Brewer, 2008.
