= You Can't Win 'Em All =

1970 war film directed by Peter Collinson

- Theatrical release poster by Frank McCarthy
- Directed by: Peter Collinson
- Written by: Leo V. Gordon
- Produced by: Gene Corman
- Starring: Tony Curtis; Charles Bronson; Michèle Mercier; Patrick Magee
- Cinematography: Kenneth Higgins
- Edited by: Raymond Poulton
- Music by: Bert Kaempfert
- Production company: S.R.O. Company Inc.
- Distributed by: Columbia Pictures
- Release date: 24 July 1970
- Running time: 100 minutes
- Countries: United Kingdom; United States
- Language: English

You Can't Win 'Em All is a 1970 British-American war film, written by Leo Gordon (also an actor who appears in the film) and directed by Peter Collinson. It stars Tony Curtis, Charles Bronson and Michèle Mercier. The film is set at the end of the Greco-Turkish War (1919–1922). Two American mercenaries are forced to serve an Ottoman governor, who wants them to escort his daughters to Cairo. He also wants them to safeguard a treasure.

== Plot ==
The end of the Ottoman Empire is near. Two American soldiers of fortune – Adam and Josh – team up in 1922 Turkey with separate missions. Josh and his men are interested in profiting from the turmoil prevailing as the Ottoman Empire collapses. Adam, the surviving heir to a shipping company, hopes to reclaim a ship seized by the Germans during World War I and interned in a Turkish port. Before they can achieve their goals, they are captured by the forces of Osman Bey, an Ottoman governor.

Osman Bey is impressed by the Americans' firepower – which includes Thompson submachine guns – and enlists them in a mission to escort his daughters, seemingly to Mecca, but really to Cairo. Because of the war, Turkish ports are blockaded by the British. Knowing that an American ship is not subject to the blockade, Adam suggests using the one held by the Turks, once they have returned it to him.

With Osman Bey's consent, the group sets off for the coast with Osman Bey's daughters, and also their guardian, the beautiful and formidable Aila. Along the way, they must contend with the dangers of the terrain, the war, the machinations of Osman Bey's opportunistic colonel and also each other's greed. They also begin to realize that the Bey was not open with them about the real object of their mission, to safeguard a priceless treasure from the empire's enemies.

During one desperate battle, Aila convinces Josh to abandon his men and Adam, and flee with her and a suitcase full of jewels. Adam and a few of the other mercenaries survive and reach the port of Smyrna, where they find Josh, Aila and Adam's ship. However, before Adam and Josh can come to blows over Josh's betrayal, panicked Ottoman soldiers board the ship, seeking to escape the nationalists. In the firefight, the ship catches fire. Josh and Adam are captured by the victorious nationalists and brought before their general, who offers them their freedom in exchange for the jewels. Aila shows up, and Josh and Adam realize that she is a nationalist spy. She has persuaded the general to let them go since he has the real treasure, an ancient Koran hidden in the suitcase. The mercenaries suspect Aila stole the jewels herself.

== Cast ==
- Tony Curtis as Adam Dyer
- Charles Bronson as Josh Corey
- Michèle Mercier as Aila
- Patrick Magee as The General (based on Kemal Atatürk)
- Fikret Hakan as Colonel Elçi
- Grégoire Aslan as Osman Bey
- Leo Gordon as Bolek
- John Alderson as US Marine Major
- Tony Bonner as Reese
- Horst Janson as Wollen
- John Acheson as Davis
- Howard Goorney
- Salih Güney as Captain Enver
- Yüksel Gözen as Papadopoulos
- Erol Keskin
- Ken Buckle
- Gonia Halil as Madam
- Terry York
- Mümtaz Alpaslan
- Manny Michael

Uncredited (in order of appearance)
Nosher Powell	Horse rider
Paul Stassino	Gunner major
Reed De Rouen	U.S. Navy CPO

Uncredited voice actors:

- David de Keyser
- Roger Delgado
- Robert Rietty

== Production ==
The film was originally known as Dubious Patriots.

"The country, the people, were fabulous", said Tony Curtis shortly after filming ended. "The thing that did us in was the very shoddy British production set up. They promised certain things on location and didn't provide them. There were inadequate sanitary conditions: people got sick. The director, Peter Collinson? I have no comment about Mr Collinson. Some day I'll tell you about him."

Aircraft sequences were flown and coordinated by Charles Boddington and Lewis Benjamin. The aircraft were owned by ex-RCAF pilot Lynn Garrison who shipped several of his S.E.5 replicas from Ireland to Turkey for the production. They were previously featured in The Blue Max and Darling Lili and would go on to star in Von Richthofen and Brown, Zeppelin, The Great Waldo Pepper, and numerous TV commercials.

== See also ==
- Vera Cruz, a 1954 film with a similar plot set in the Mexican Revolution.
- P.O.W. The Escape, a 1986 film with a similar plot set in the Vietnam War.
