= Miraculous Journey =

1948 film by Sam Newfield

- DVD cover art
- Directed by: Sam Newfield (as Peter Stewart)
- Screenplay by: Fred K. Myton
- Produced by: Sigmund Neufeld
- Starring: Rory Calhoun; Virginia Grey
- Cinematography: John H. Greenhalgh, Jr.
- Edited by: Holbrook N. Todd
- Music by: Leo Erdody
- Production company: Columbia Pictures
- Distributed by: Film Classics, Inc.
- Release date: September 1, 1948
- Running time: 83 minutes
- Country: United States
- Language: English

Miraculous Journey is a 1948 film about seven airplane passengers who find themselves stranded in an African jungle after their plane crashes. It was directed by Sam Newfield, under the pseudonym of Peter Stewart. The film stars Rory Calhoun and Virginia Grey.

== Plot ==
A group of seven people - an actress, a blind girl, a financier, a gangster, an heiress, a hostess, and a pilot - survive an airplane crash to find themselves deserted in an African jungle. The group come across an old hermit who has been living on the island for a while. The hermit teaches them how to survive in the jungle, though the unrepentant gangster is eaten by a crocodile. Eventually, a member of the group named Larry uses a canoe to get off the island. Larry locates a helicopter and flies back to the island, where he picks up the rest of the group. Although they offer the hermit a ride, he declines the offer, feeling he has become too attached to the jungle.

== Cast ==
- Rory Calhoun as Larry Burke
- Audrey Long as Mary
- Virginia Grey as Patricia
- June Storey as Rene
- George Cleveland as the Hermit

== Production ==
Miraculous Journey was directed by Sam Newfield, credited under the pseudonym of Peter Stewart. His brother Sigmund Neufeld produced the film. Rory Calhoun, Virginia Grey, Audrey Long, George Cleveland, Jim Bannon, June Storey, Thurston Hall, Carole Donne, and Andrew Long appear in the film, as does dog actor "Flame." Fred K. Myton wrote the screenplay, with John H. Greenhalgh, Jr., handling the cinematography and Holbrook Todd doing the editing. Leo Erdody scored Miraculous Journey; it would be his final film credit. The film's production took place from late March to mid-April 1948.

== Release and reception ==
The film was distributed by Film Classics, Inc., and premiered on September 1, 1948. Alpha Video released Miraculous Journey on DVD in 2012.

Film critic Leonard Maltin gave Miraculous Journey one star and a half, feeling that it was "substandard". TV Guide gave the film two stars out of four, noting that while the film had potential, the film lost its effect "because of the filmmakers' inability to decide whether the story should concentrate on the moral aspects or the action."
