= Richard Evans (actor) =

American actor (1935–2021)

- Born: January 23, 1935; Kansas City, Missouri, U.S.
- Died: October 2, 2021 (aged 86)
- Occupation: Actor
- Years active: 1958–2007

Richard Rodell Evans (January 23, 1935 – October 2, 2021) was an American film and television actor. He guest starred in numerous television series such as Wagon Train, Alfred Hitchcock Presents, Sea Hunt, Cheyenne, The Rifleman, Bonanza,The Fugitive, Perry Mason, Gunsmoke, Iron Horse, The Men from Shiloh, Star Trek (episode, "Patterns of Force"), and The High Chaparral.

== Life and career ==
Richard Rodell Evans was born in Kansas City, Missouri on January 23, 1935.

In 1960 he appeared on The Rifleman in S2, E20 "Sins of the Father" as Shep Coleman. On April 15, 1962, Evans was cast as a young cutthroat, Billy Deal, in the episode "Sunday" of the ABC-WB western series, Lawman. He also was in a 1969 Lassie episode, "No Margin for Error" (Season 16). Evans also played secondary roles in several B-films. Evans is best remembered for his portrayal of college English professor Paul Hanley in the ABC soap opera Peyton Place, a role which he played in 1965.

Evans died from cancer on October 2, 2021, at the age of 86.

== Filmography ==
1962	The Rifleman	Bruce	Season 4 Episode 19: "Young Man's Fancy"
1959	Alfred Hitchcock Presents	Harry	Season 4 Episode 23: "I'll Take Care of You"
1960	Kidnapped	Ransome, the cabin boy	Uncredited
1960	Too Soon to Love	Jim Mills	
1965	Synanon	Hopper	
1965	The Return of Mr. Moto	Chief Inspector Marlow	
1968	Star Trek	Isak	Season 2 Episode 21: "Patterns of Force"
1969	The Virginian	Tom Kabe	Season 8 Episode 2: "A Flash of Darkness"
1970	Macho Callahan	Mulvey	
1972	Dirty Little Billy	Goldie	
1974	The Nickel Ride	Bobby	
1977	Islands in the Stream	Willy	
1991	Going Under	Shipyard Worker	
2007	Shadow of Rain	Angelo	
2015	Emperor of Time	Eadweard Muybridge	
