= A Witch Without a Broom =

- Spanish: Una bruja sin escoba
- Directed by: José María Elorrieta
- Screenplay by: José María Elorrieta
- Story by: José Luis Navarro; José María Elorrieta
- Produced by: Sidney W. Pink; Félix Sánchez; Stan Torchia
- Starring: Jeffrey Hunter; Maria Perschy
- Cinematography: Alfonso Nieva
- Edited by: John F. Hovarth; Juan Pisón
- Music by: Fernando García Morcillo
- Production companies: Cinemagic Inc.; L.M. Films; Lacy Internacional Films; Westside International Films
- Distributed by: Castilla Films; Producers Releasing Organization
- Release date: 12 February 1968 (Spain)
- Running time: 88 min

A Witch Without a Broom is a 1967 Spanish film starring Jeffrey Hunter. It was directed by José María Elorrieta.

== Plot ==
Professor Logan, who suffers from a slight detachment from reality, teaches at the University of Madrid. He is beamed to the 15th century by the witch Marianna, who is in love with him. Returning home is only possible with the help of her father, Wurlitz, a Toledo sorcerer, who is away at a conference. So the two attempt to follow him using a time-space experiment, but end up in prehistory, in 1st-century Rome, where they are enslaved and win a horse race, and in 1999, where the only female survivors of a war want to found a new race with Logan. Marianna manages to locate her father and has herself and Logan transported to the 20th century for eternity.

Logan wakes up in a hospital bed, where he appears to have hallucinated. His nurse is Marianna.

== Cast ==
- Jeffrey Hunter as Garver Logan (as Jeff Hunter)
- Maria Perschy as Mariana
- Perla Cristal as Octavia
- Gustavo Rojo as Cayo
- Félix Dafauce as Necio
- Alfonso de la Vega
- Esperanza Roy as Valeria (as Esperanza Roig)
- Doris Kent
- John Clark as Chariot master
- Jesús Jiménez
- Reginal Guilliams as Don Ignacio
- Francisco Braña as Captain of the Guard
- Luis Gordon
- Katherine Ellison as Yolanda
- Al Mulock as Wurlitz the Wizard
- Paloma Cela as Future Woman
- Elena Rubí
- Cristina Muñoz Laguna
- Julio Pérez Tabernero
- Marisol Ayuso as Elisa
- Ángel Menéndez as Doctor
- Pilar Laguna
- Laura Jimeno
- Juan Antonio Peral
- Carl Rapp as Proprietor
