= The Greeneyed Elephant =

1960 film

- VHS cover for 'The Green Eyed Elephant'
- Directed by: Peer Guldbrandsen
- Written by: Peer Guldbrandsen; Sidney W. Pink
- Produced by: Hans Barfod
- Starring: Naura Hayden, Delphi Lawrence, Dirch Passer
- Cinematography: Aage Wiltrup
- Edited by: Edith Nisted Nielsen
- Music by: Sven Gyldmark
- Distributed by: Troma Entertainment
- Release date: 15 August 1960
- Running time: 76 minutes
- Country: Denmark
- Language: Danish

The Greeneyed Elephant (Danish: Elefanter på loftet) is a 1960 Danish body-swap comedy directed by Peter Guildbrassen and Sidney W. Pink. It stars Naura Hayden and Delphi Lawrence, and includes Dirch Passer playing a smaller role though top-billed in the marketing.

== Premise ==
Two aspiring actresses accidentally use an ancient Aztec elephant sculpture to switch bodies, thus combining their inner and outer talents, making it possible for one of them to land a coveted role. Based on the novel Turnabout (1931) by Thorne Smith.

== Cast ==
- Dirch Passer - Dennis
- Naura Hayden - Sally Fitzpatrik
- Delphi Lawrence - Lisa
- Ove Sprogøe - Tolderen
- Bjørn Watt-Boolsen - Tom
- Kirsten Passer - Mrs. Kelly
- Phil Baker - Arthur Croft
- Avi Sagild - Sekretær
- Grethe Sønck - Sangerinde
- Peer Guldbrandsen - Instruktøren / fortælleren (voice) (uncredited)
- Gitte Müller - Scriptgirl (uncredited)

== Production ==
The film is in fact a TV pilot that became a feature film.

== Reception ==
The film is seen as the Danish example of the trope that is body swapping. As the other two films made by Pink in Denmark, The Green-Eyed Elephant offers no erotic content and was very poorly received by Danish critics

== See also ==
- Reptilicus, another film written by Pink and starring Passer
