= The Warrior and the Slave Girl =

- Directed by: Vittorio Cottafavi
- Written by: Gian Paolo Callegari; Ennio De Concini; Francesco De Feo; Gianfranco Parolini; Giovanni Simonelli; Francesco Thellung; Natividad Zaro
- Starring: Ettore Manni
- Cinematography: Mario Pacheco
- Edited by: Julio Peña
- Music by: Roberto Nicolosi
- Production companies: Alexandra Produzioni Cinematografiche; Atenea Films
- Distributed by: Columbia Pictures (US)
- Release dates: October 12, 1958 (Italy); November 1959 (United States)
- Running time: 88 minutes
- Country: Italy
- Language: Italian

The Warrior and the Slave Girl (Italian: La rivolta dei gladiatori, Spanish: La rebelión de los gladiadores, French: La révolte des gladiateurs) is a 1958 Italian-Spanish-French historical adventure film in Supercinescope and Eastman Color directed by Vittorio Cottafavi.

== Premise ==
A cruel Armenian princess craves the throne of the young king Osroé, while a popular uprising led by Asclepius breaks out.

== Cast ==
- Ettore Manni as Marcus Numidius
- Gianna Maria Canale as Amira
- Mara Cruz as Zahar
- Georges Marchal as Asclepius
- Rafael Luis Calvo as Lucano
- Fidel Martín as Osroé
- Jesús Tordesillas as Governor Crisipius
- Rafael Durán as Burkala
- Nando Tamberlani as Senator Lucilius
- Valeria Moriconi as Servant
