= Today's Melodies =

1960 film

- Directed by: José María Elorrieta
- Written by: José María Elorrieta; José Manuel Iglesias; José Luis Navarro; Juan Antonio Verdugo
- Cinematography: Alejandro Ulloa
- Music by: Augusto Algueró; José Torregrosa
- Production company: Tyris Films
- Distributed by: Cire Films
- Release date: 1960
- Running time: 80 minutes
- Country: Spain
- Language: Spanish

Today's Melodies (Spanish: Melodías de hoy) is a 1960 Spanish musical film directed by José María Elorrieta.

== Cast ==
- Elder Barber
- Alberto Berco
- Francisco Bernal
- Celia Conde
- José Luis
- Katia Loritz
- Matilde Muñoz Sampedro
- Juan Antonio Riquelme
- José María Tasso

== Bibliography ==
- Pascual Cebollada & Luis Rubio Gil. Enciclopedia del cine español: cronología. Ediciones del Serbal, 1996.
