= Fear in the Night (1972 film) =

1972 British film by Jimmy Sangster

- Theatrical release poster
- Directed by: Jimmy Sangster
- Written by: Jimmy Sangster; Michael Syson
- Produced by: Jimmy Sangster
- Starring: Judy Geeson; Joan Collins; Peter Cushing; Ralph Bates
- Cinematography: Arthur Grant
- Edited by: Peter Weatherley
- Music by: John McCabe
- Production company: Hammer Film Productions
- Distributed by: MGM-EMI Distributors
- Release date: 2 July 1972
- Running time: 94 minutes
- Country: United Kingdom
- Language: English
- Budget: £141,000
- Box office: £835,000

Fear in the Night (Note: The film was also released under the alternate titles Dynasty of Fear and Honeymoon of Fear) is a 1972 British psychological horror film directed, produced, and co-written by Jimmy Sangster, produced by Hammer Film Productions, and starring Judy Geeson, Joan Collins, Peter Cushing, and Ralph Bates. It focuses on a psychologically fragile woman who, upon relocating to a rural boarding school where her husband has taken a job, finds herself being tormented by a mysterious figure with a prosthetic arm.

Like many horror films of its era, Fear in the Night has been noted for its usage of female hysteria as a central narrative motif, and was released as a double bill in the United Kingdom with Straight on Till Morning, another Hammer film featuring similar themes. In the United States, the film was released as part of a double bill with Demons of the Mind.

== Plot ==
Peggy, an unassuming twenty-two-year-old caregiver, has recently married Robert Heller and is scheduled to move with him to a secluded boys' boarding school south of London for his work. The night before she is to meet Robert to leave the city, she is attacked in her home by a one-armed man with a prosthetic hand and falls unconscious. Rattled by the attack, she leaves with Robert the following morning to the boarding school, which is run by headmaster Michael Carmichael.

Robert and Peggy arrive at the school and settle into their chalet across the road from the main school building. They make plans to meet the Carmichaels for dinner that evening. The next day, Robert leaves for work. Peggy explores the empty school; she hears the voices of boys chatting but finds the classrooms to be mysteriously empty. She encounters the headmaster Michael, who shows her around the building; she leaves him in the school and returns to her cottage. Shortly after entering her house, she is again attacked. Robert returns and is very concerned about Peggy's mental state; although Peggy insists that she was attacked, he doesn't believe her. He cancels the dinner appointment with the Carmichaels.

Later, Peggy and Robert go for a drive around the sprawling property, where they meet the headmaster's wife, Molly, who is rabbit hunting. Peggy finds Molly stand-offish toward her. That evening, Robert leaves for a meeting in London, and Peggy believes an intruder has come into the chalet; she arms herself with a shotgun. She descends the staircase and sees Michael entering the front door; she notices that he has a prosthetic arm. Panicked, she shoots him and flees the chalet, but he continues to pursue her. She runs into the school, where she hears a chorus of racket and boys' voices echoing through the halls. Michael corners her in an upstairs dormitory, and she shoots at him again, but he is unresponsive to the gunfire. He approaches her, and she faints.

The following day, Robert returns, finding Peggy in a nearly catatonic state inside the school and a pool of blood in the hallway. Michael is nowhere to be found. He questions her about what happened, but she says she cannot remember. Robert explains to Peggy that he had met Michael when he was working in a hospital as a medical student; the boarding school had nearly burned to the ground in an accident years prior, and, devastated, Michael returned to the property, setting up recordings of boys' laughter and classroom lectures over the building's intercoms to re-create the feeling of the school's former glory days.

That night, Robert meets with Molly in the school; it is revealed that the two are having an affair and that Robert married the mentally fragile Peggy in order to coax her into murdering Michael out of fear for her life. Robert brings in Peggy, and Molly demands she reveal where Michael's body is. Molly goes to search for him, and shortly after, the sound of bells echoes throughout the school. Robert binds Peggy's arms and brings her into the main hall of the school, where Michael's voice comes over the intercom. He reveals that he was aware of Robert and Molly's plot to have him killed and that he had loaded the shotgun in the chalet with blanks. Robert loads the shotgun with bullets and shoots at what he believes to be Michael hiding under a sheet covering a couch. When he lifts the sheet, however, he reveals Molly's dead body, bound and gagged.

Robert storms out of the school with Peggy and attempts to hang her from the tree outside in a staged suicide but is suddenly grabbed in a strangle grip by Michael. The next morning, two policemen arrive, saying they received a call from Michael. Peggy tells them he's inside the school and that a new term is beginning. One of the police officers tells her that the school has been shut down for years, when a recording of a boys' choir begins emanating from the building. In the tree behind the school, Robert's dead body hangs from the noose.

== Cast ==
- Judy Geeson as Peggy Heller
- Joan Collins as Molly Carmichael
- Peter Cushing as Michael Carmichael
- Ralph Bates as Robert Heller
- James Cossins as The Doctor
- Gillian Lind as Mrs. Beamish
- John Bown as 1st Policeman
- Brian Grellis as 2nd Policeman

== Production ==
=== Development ===
Fear in the Night derived from a script written by Jimmy Sangster called Brainstorm that was originally developed for Universal Pictures in 1963. The film had been scheduled to go into production several times: first in autumn 1964, then "tentatively" in 1965. In 1967, he retitled the film The Claw. It was not until 1971 that the script was altered by Sangster and co-writer Michael Syson and turned into Fear in the Night.

The film was financed from EMI Films."

=== Filming ===
The film was shot on location in Aldenham, Hertfordshire. Principal photography began on 15 November 1971, and was completed by 17 December. The scenes featuring the lakeshore (including the scene where Judy Geeson's character encounters Joan Collins') were shot at Aldenham Country Park around the Aldenham Reservoir. Bhaktivedanta Manor was used for the location of the boys' school. Additional filming took place at Elstree Studios in Hertfordshire.

== Release ==
Fear in the Night was released in the United Kingdom at select on cinemas on 2 July 1972, expanding the following week on 9 July 1972. It was shown as a double bill with Straight on Till Morning, another Hammer film with similar themes. The films were shown in cinemas as a double feature titled "Women in Fear." Executive Michael Carreras at Hammer studios conceived the pairing as a marketing tool, stating: "My original concept was to have two properties by the same author on a central theme, being made into two films both directed by the same person."

The film later premiered as a double bill with the Hammer film Demons of the Mind in the United States on 18 October 1972, in conjunction with the Halloween season.

=== Home media ===
The film was released on VHS in the United States by Thorn EMI home video, later receiving a VHS release through Republic Pictures in 1998. It was released for the first time on DVD in North America on 8 October 2002 by Anchor Bay Entertainment as part of their "Hammer Collection" series. It was later released in the United Kingdom on DVD by Studio Canal on 15 January 2007.

On 30 October 2017, StudioCanal released a Blu-ray edition in the United Kingdom. Scream Factory announced in 2019 that they will be releasing a Blu-ray edition in North America on 27 August 2019.

In 2026, Severin Films announced a forthcoming 4K UHD Blu-ray release of the film as part of a box set of Sangster-directed Hammer films.

== Reception ==
=== Critical response ===
Time Out called the film "one of those neatly constructed but slightly mechanical psycho-thrillers which make you feel as if someone is pushing buttons connected to electrodes in your brain", but that "Hammer fans will soon recognise the plot as a thinly disguised reworking of A Taste of Fear (sic)". Graeme Clark of The Spinning Image retrospectively rated the film 6 out of 10 stars, saying: "Fear in the Night did nothing to improve [Hammer Films]'s fortunes, but it received fair reviews and those who did see it found it satisfying, if a shade modest."

Dave Sindelar of SciFilm.org praised the film's performances, but criticized elements of its script, saying: "Unfortunately, it's at the service of one of the most predictable scripts I've encountered in some time, and this is one of those stories that should be anything but predictable", comparing the film to Gaslight (1944) and Diabolique (1955). Popcorn Pictures gave the film a middling review, calling it "a brave attempt by Hammer to go in a new direction but ultimately fails because even in 1972, the plot twists weren’t new or original in the slightest. It's entertaining enough if you want to stick it out but it will never be regarded as one of Hammer’s better films."

=== Analysis and themes ===
Literary critic John Kenneth Muir has noted Fear in the Night as a mood piece, as well as an example of the gendered fictional representations of "damsels in distress," a motif that was recurrent in horror films of the era, including amongst Hammer Studios' films itself— Straight on Till Morning, which Fear in the Night was paired with upon its British theatrical release, contains similar themes of female hysteria. Muir likens the film to the 1971 American horror film Let's Scare Jessica to Death, in which a psychologically-fragile female figure, also displaced in a new and strange environment, is tormented by events and visions which may or may not be occurring in reality. "Despite such threadbare material," Muir says, "there is an interesting sexual undercurrent to the film."

Commenting on the film's establishing cinematography, Muir further states:

Fear in the Night starts with a pan across a field, as leaves blow across it. We then see the abandoned school that is the film's central setting, and experience a feeling of isolation and foreboding. Then the soundtrack broadcasts eerie singsongy young voices lifted in song, as the camera probes the gym, the dining room, the bunk room... It's a strange tour of a seemingly haunted or perhaps cursed place, and the (effective) punctuation of the montage is a view of a hanging corpse. It's an artistic, interesting way to set the scene for the story proper, but the film never again recovers from the icy, morbid impression of its opening.

David Huckvale, author of Hammer Films' Psychological Thrillers, 1950-1972, compared the film's treatment of flashback and time to Parsifal, and claims that the film operates as a "series of essays on nostalgia"— "The plot of Fear in the Night depends on Peggy's vulnerability caused by [...] trauma, and much of the film's dramatic tension is built upon her anxiety that the past is not over and done with."

Huckvale also draws comparisons on the character of Molly Carmichael (Joan Collins) as a catalyst to Peggy's purported hysteria, likening her to the unnamed wife of Maximilian de Winter in Daphne du Maurier's Rebecca. "[The character] of Peggy marries a man she knows little about and then finds herself transplanted into a grand house with its own intimidating rituals, but with the major difference that the Rebecca figure is still there in the form of Joan Collins' Molly Carmichael," Huckvale says. "Peggy sees the heartless Molly shoot a cute little rabbit. Molly is a brutal, catlike character, and her superficial smile collapses when Peggy and Robert leave."

Huckvale's interpretation of the scene between Peggy (Judy Geeson) and Headmaster Carmichael (Peter Cushing), during which he removes her hair-tie, as a metaphor for sexual violation, echoing John David Muir's claim of the film's sexual undercurrents:

Just as the Biblical Samson's hair signified his virility, so too does Mélisande's hair stand for her sexual allure. Thus, when Carmichael unties Peggy's hair band, we are intended to interpret the act as a form of sublimated rape— at least that is the implication at this stage in the plot. It also gives Sangster an opportunity to reveal Carmichael's prosthetic arm, which he threateningly clicks into position to hold one end of the ribbon while he unties the knot with his other hand. Carmichael does indeed seem to be the man who attacked Peggy in London, but things are never so obvious in a Sangster script.

== See also ==
- List of Hammer films
- Gender in speculative fiction

== Sources ==
- Hearn, Marcus; Barnes, Alan (September 2007). "Taste of Fear". The Hammer Story: The Authorised History of Hammer Films (Limited ed.). London, England: Titan Books. ISBN 978-1-84576-185-1. OCLC 717437688.
- Huckvale, David (2014). Hammer Films' Psychological Thrillers, 1950-1972. Jefferson, North Carolina: McFarland. pp. 160–166. ISBN 978-0-786-47471-4. OCLC 900304798.
- Johnson, Tom; Del Vecchio, Deborah (2012). Hammer Films: An Exhaustive Filmography (reprint ed.). Jefferson, North Carolina: McFarland. ISBN 978-0-786-46922-2. OCLC 753637279.
- McFarlane, Brian (2005). The Cinema of Britain and Ireland. London: Wallflower Press. ISBN 978-1-904-76438-0. OCLC 475238692.
- Muir, John Kenneth (2007). Horror Films of the 1970s (reprint ed.). Jefferson, North Carolina: McFarland. ISBN 978-0-786-43104-5. OCLC 182862677.
- Neame, Christopher (2003). Rungs on a Ladder: Hammer Films Seen Through a Soft Gauze. The Scarecrow Filmmakers Series. Vol. 1. Lanham, Marlynd: Scarecrow Press. ISBN 978-0-810-84735-4. OCLC 936926103.
- Pykett, Derek (2008). British Horror Film Locations. Jefferson, North Carolina: McFarland. pp. 147–148. ISBN 978-0-786-43329-2. OCLC 173241118.
- Sangster, Jimmy (2001). Inside Hammer. London, England: Reynolds & Hearn. ISBN 978-1-903-11120-8. OCLC 47356101.
- Smith, Gary A. (2006). Uneasy Dreams: The Golden Age of British Horror Films, 1956-1976. Jefferson, North Carolina: McFarland. ISBN 978-0-786-42661-4. OCLC 718521460.
