= 1001 Nights (1968 film) =

- Directed by: José María Elorrieta
- Written by: José María Elorrieta; José Luis Navarro
- Produced by: Sidney W. Pink
- Starring: Jeff Cooper; Raf Vallone; Luciana Paluzzi; Paul Naschy
- Release date: 1968
- Running time: 92 minutes
- Countries: Spain; Italy
- Languages: English; Italian; Spanish

1001 Nights, also known as Sharaz or La esclava del paraíso, is a 1968 Spanish-Italian film directed by José María Elorrieta and starring Raf Vallone and Luciana Paluzzi.
