= Madigan's Millions =

1968 film by Stanley Prager

- English-language poster
- Directed by: Stanley Prager (Giorgio Gentili)
- Written by: José Luis Bayonas
- Produced by: Sidney W. Pink
- Starring: Dustin Hoffman; Elsa Martinelli; Cesar Romero
- Cinematography: Manuel Rojas
- Distributed by: Altamira Films (Spain) (theatrical); American International Pictures (USA) (theatrical); Troma Entertainment (Home Video)
- Release date: 1968
- Running time: 86 minutes 93 minutes (Spain)
- Countries: Italy; Spain; United States
- Language: English

Madigan's Millions (Italian: Un dollaro per 7 vigliacchi, Spanish: El Millón de Madigan) is a 1968 Italian-Spanish comedy crime film directed by Giorgio Gentili as Stanley Prager and produced by Sidney W. Pink.

The movie was shot in 1966, but was not released for two years. The film is in the lowbrow comedy genre, with comic stop-action chase scenes, as well as many scenes involving spaghetti Western-style gunplay on the streets of Rome. Hoffman's Fister is a naive and mild-mannered bureaucrat with a sense for sniffing out phonies.

The interiors of the film were shot largely in Spain, with exteriors in Rome.

The movie titles say Madigan’s Million, not Millions.

== Plot ==
It stars Dustin Hoffman in his first movie role, as Jason Fister, a young U.S. Treasury Dept. official sent to Rome to recover a large sum of money owed to the United States government by a deceased mobster.

== Cast ==
- Dustin Hoffman – Jason Fister
- Elsa Martinelli – Vic Shaw
- Cesar Romero – Mike Madigan
- Gustavo Rojo – Lt. Arco
- Fernando Hilbeck – Burke
- Riccardo Garrone – Cirini
- Franco Fabrizi – Caronda
- Umberto Raho – Photographer
- Gérard Tichy – J. P. Ogilvie

== Release ==
The film was released in the United States by American International Pictures in 1969, after Hoffman's success in The Graduate and Midnight Cowboy.

== See also ==
- Who's Minding the Mint? (1967)
