= Our Men in Bagdad =

- Directed by: Paolo Bianchini
- Written by: Paolo Bianchini; Robert Velher; Augusto Caminito; Maurizio Lucci; Mauro Severino
- Produced by: Ray Ventura
- Starring: Rory Calhoun; Roger Hanin
- Cinematography: Giovanni Raffaldi
- Music by: Roberto Pregadio; Walter Rizzati
- Release date: 1966
- Language: Italian

Our Men in Bagdad (Italian: Il gioco delle spie, French: Bagarre à Bagdad pour X-27) is a 1966 Italian-French Eurospy film starring Rory Calhoun. It was the directorial debut of Paolo Bianchini after about 60 films as assistant director. It was shot in Algeria, Rome and Civitavecchia.

== Plot ==
Four secret agents working for the Soviets come into possession of a briefcase containing sensitive files that document an agreement between the American government and an emirate to supply weapons in exchange for oil.

== Cast ==
- Rory Calhoun as Alex
- Roger Hanin as Sadov
- Evi Marandi as Sonja
- Ralph Baldwin as Dimitri
- Jean Gaven as General Yuri Fiodorenko
- Lea Padovani as Fiodorenko's partner
- Tino Carraro as The Professor
- John Karlsen as Botschafter
