= Utah Blaine =

1957 film by Fred F. Sears

- Directed by: Fred F. Sears
- Screenplay by: Robert E. Kent; James B. Gordon
- Based on: novel by Louis L'Amour
- Produced by: Sam Katzman
- Starring: Rory Calhoun
- Cinematography: Benjamin H. Kline
- Edited by: Charles Nelson
- Color process: Black and white
- Production company: Clover Productions
- Distributed by: Columbia Pictures
- Release date: February 1, 1957 (United States)
- Running time: 75 minutes
- Country: United States
- Language: English

Utah Blaine is a 1957 American Western film directed by Fred F. Sears and starring Rory Calhoun. It was based on a novel by Louis L'Amour.

== Plot ==
After saving a rancher from hanging, cowboy Mike "Utah" Blaine learns that his enemy Rink Witter is now a hired gun working for wealthy Russ Nevers, who is out to own every piece of land in the territory.

Utah teams up with Angie Kinyon, another murdered landowner's daughter, and rancher Mary Blake to maintain lawful ownership of their properties. He has a fistfight with Gus Ortmann, a large and popular fellow in town who misunderstands Utah's purpose. Witter then pulls a gun on Blaine, but Utah's old pal Rip Coker arrives to protect Blaine.

Witter threatens Angie while trying to find Utah. When Gus tries to defend her while hiding in the cellar, Witter shoots him. Utah and Rip shoot some of the vigilantes but Witter and the rest escape. The townspeople rally to Utah's side so that when Nevers and Witter confront him, dozens of guns end up aimed at them. In the final shootout, Nevers is the first one killed and Utah eventually kills Witter. Utah ends up with a ranch of his own and with Angie as well. Rink Witter had tracked down and murdered Joe Neal, but Neal's will made Blaine half owner of the ranch, giving Blaine even more reason to stay in the fight.

== Cast ==
- Rory Calhoun as Utah Blaine
- Susan Cummings as Angie Kinyon
- Angela Stevens as Mary Blake
- Max Baer as Gus Ortmann
- Ray Teal as Russ Nevers
- Paul Langton as Rip Coker
- Ken Christy as Joe Neal
- George Keymas as Rink Witter
- Gene Roth as Tom Cory, Blacksmith
