= A Candidate for a Killing =

- Directed by: José María Elorrieta
- Produced by: Sidney W. Pink
- Starring: John Richardson; Anita Ekberg
- Release date: 1969
- Countries: Italy; Spain
- Language: English

A Candidate for a Killing is a 1969 Italian film. It starred John Richardson and Anita Ekberg.

It was an early film credit for composer Bill Conti.
