= Avi Sagild =

Danish actress

- Born: 22 February 1933; Pittsburgh, Pennsylvania, United States
- Died: 19 September 1995 (aged 62); Denmark
- Occupation: Actress
- Years active: 1958–1993

Avi Sagild (22 February 1933 – 19 September 1995) was a Danish film actress. She appeared in 21 films between 1958 and 1993. She was born in Pittsburgh, Pennsylvania, United States and died in Denmark.

== Selected filmography ==
- The Greeneyed Elephant (1960)
- Venus fra Vestø (1962)
- Don Olsen kommer til byen (1964)
