= A Candle for the Devil =

- Theatrical release poster
- Spanish: Una vela para el diablo
- Literally: A Candle for the Devil
- Directed by: Eugenio Martín
- Written by: Antonio Fos; Eugenio Martín
- Produced by: José López Moreno
- Starring: Aurora Bautista; Judy Geeson; Esperanza Roy
- Cinematography: José F. Aguayo
- Edited by: Pablo G. del Amo
- Music by: Antonio Pérez Olea
- Distributed by: Paramount Pictures
- Release date: 1 February 1973
- Running time: 83 minutes
- Country: Spain
- Language: Spanish

A Candle for the Devil (lit. Spanish: Una vela para el diablo), also released as It Happened at Nightmare Inn, is a 1973 Spanish horror film directed by Eugenio Martín and starring Aurora Bautista and Judy Geeson. Its plot follows two sisters in Spain, both suffering from extreme repression and religious paranoia, who murder a British guest at their inn just before her sister arrives to meet with her.

== Plot ==
Middle-aged sisters Marta and Verónica run an inn in a Spanish village for travelers. May, a British guest, sunbathes topless on the terrace, and is confronted by the sisters, whose religious convictions forbid such behavior. The three get into an argument, and May is pushed down a staircase and smashes through a glass window, which slashes her to death. As Marta and Verónica scramble to hide her body, her sister Laura arrives at the inn. Marta tells Laura that May checked out and paid her bill earlier that day. Laura decides to take a room until she can find May.

Helen Miller, an indecent woman by the sisters' standards, checks in to the inn the following day, after which Verónica goes to visit Luis, with whom she is having an affair, and the two have sex. After, she confesses to Luis that Marta has discovered money missing, which she had given to Luis. Meanwhile, while strolling, Marta spies on several young men skinny-dipping. Later, when Helen returns to the inn late at night, she gets into an argument with Marta, who has forbidden that guests arrive back later than 11pm. Helen taunts Marta, who then stabs her to death.

The next morning, an American woman, Norma, arrives to stay at the inn with her infant child. Bothered by Helen's disappearance, Laura checks out of the inn and goes to stay in a different hotel. She goes to meet with a local police chief to tell him of her suspicions, and he reveals that Marta's fiancé had disappeared on their wedding day years before. Upon returning to the inn later that night after a brief meeting with Laura, Norma finds Marta and Verónica in the kitchen with her baby. Marta chastises Norma for being a single unmarried mother. Marta and Norma begin fighting, and Norma slaps her in the face several times; as Norma attempts to retrieve her baby from Verónica, Marta stabs her in the back, killing her. In Norma's belongings, Verónica discovers a letter from Norma to her husband about their pending divorce, revealing that Norma was in fact married. This leaves Verónica riddled with guilt, but Marta is unmoved.

Laura breaks into the inn that night to search for evidence implicating the sisters in the disappearances, and investigates large wine vats in the basement, but flees when the sisters hear her. The next day, Laura returns to the inn with a local man, Eduardo, posing as her husband who has just arrived, and rents a room. Marta is suspicious, believing she has seen the man before in town. Meanwhile, during a meal at the inn's restaurant, a woman falls violently ill with food poisoning; her husband notices an odd piece of meat on her plate, and he wraps it in a napkin to give to police. Late that night, Eduardo goes to investigate the inn's basement. In one of the vats, he finds pieces of flesh and bones floating in red wine, along with Norma's severed head. As he steps away from the vat, Marta stabs him to death.

Meanwhile, at the local police station, it is determined that the piece of meat is in fact a chunk of flesh with an eyeball attached; the body part had been stirred up after Laura's earlier attempt to probe the contents of the vats. While the police and a band of villagers head to the inn, Laura goes to search for Eduardo, and finds him dead in the sisters' bedroom. There, she is confronted by the two women, who bind and gag her. Laura flees downstairs with her hands tied, and attempts to find an unlocked door. The sisters corner a helpless Laura against a window. She opens the drapes, however, revealing the police and villagers who witness the scene.

== Cast ==
- Aurora Bautista as Marta
- Judy Geeson as Laura Barkley
- Esperanza Roy as Verónica
- Víctor Barrera as Eduardo (as Vic Winner)
- Lone Fleming as Helen Miller
- Blanca Estrada as Norma (as Blanche Estrada)
- Carlos Piñeiro as Luis (as Charley Piñeiro)
- Loreta Tovar as May
- Montserrat Julió as Beatriz
- Fernando Villena as Médico
- Fernando Hilbeck as Alcalde

== Release ==
The film received theatrical distribution through Paramount Pictures in Spain, and was released in the United States under the title It Happened at Nightmare Inn.

=== Home media ===
In 2015, the film received a Blu-ray release through Scorpion Releasing that was limited to 1,000 copies. Vinegar Syndrome reissued the film in 4K UHD Blu-ray format on 30 December 2025.

== See also ==
- List of Spanish films of 1973

== Sources ==
- Schlegel, Nicholas G. (2015). Sex, Sadism, Spain, and Cinema: The Spanish Horror Film. Rowman & Littlefield. ISBN 978-1-442-25116-8.
