= Seven Vengeful Women =

1966 film

- Directed by: Rudolf Zehetgruber; Sidney W. Pink
- Written by: Mike Ashley; Theo Maria Werner
- Produced by: Zeljko Kunkera; Marcello Luchetti; José López Moreno; Robert Russ
- Starring: Anne Baxter; Maria Perschy; Gustavo Rojo
- Cinematography: Marcello Gatti; Alvaro Lanzoni
- Edited by: Antonio Ramírez de Loaysa
- Music by: Gerhard Froboess; Gregorio García Segura; Carlo Savina
- Production companies: Danny Films; L.M. Films; Danubia Films; Eurofilms
- Release date: 26 September 1966
- Running time: 101 minutes
- Countries: Spain; Italy; Austria; Liechtenstein
- Languages: English; Spanish

Seven Vengeful Women (Spanish: Las siete magníficas, Italian: 7 donne per una strage) is a 1966 western film directed by Rudolf Zehetgruber and Sidney W. Pink. It stars Anne Baxter, Maria Perschy and Gustavo Rojo. It was a co-production between Spain, Italy, Austria and Liechtenstein and was part of a string of Eurowesterns made during the decade.

It is also known by the alternative title Tall Women. In 1967 it was released in the United States by Allied Artists, after being dubbed into English.

== Synopsis ==
Following an Apache attack on a wagon train, seven female survivors who had sheltered in a cave try to make their way to safety. They are joined by a cavalry scout who is the lone survivor of an ambush of an army patrol in the area.

== Cast ==
- Anne Baxter as Mary Ann
- Maria Perschy as Ursula
- Gustavo Rojo as Gus Macintosh
- Rossella Como as Katy Grimaldi
- Adriana Ambesi as Betty Grimaldi
- Christa Linder as Bridget
- Luis Prendes as Pope
- Mara Cruz as Blanche
- Perla Cristal as Pilar
- María Mahor as Dorothy
- John Clark as Col. Howard
- Dorit Dom
- Fernando Hilbeck as White Cloud
- Renate Lanz
- Valentino Macchi
- Franco Mariotti
- Alejandra Nilo as White Cloud's squaw
- George Rigaud
- Mila Stanic

== Bibliography ==
- Thomas Weisser. Spaghetti Westerns: the Good, the Bad and the Violent. McFarland, 2005.
