= Thunder in Carolina =

1960 film

- Directed by: Paul Helmick
- Written by: Alexander Richards
- Produced by: J. Francis White
- Starring: Rory Calhoun; Alan Hale, Jr.; Connie Hines
- Cinematography: Joseph C. Brun
- Edited by: Rex Lipton
- Music by: Walter Greene
- Production company: Darlington
- Distributed by: Howco International Pictures
- Release date: June 7, 1960 (South Carolina)
- Running time: 92 minutes
- Country: United States
- Language: English

Thunder in Carolina is a 1960 stock car racing film directed by Paul Helmick and starring Rory Calhoun, Alan Hale, Jr., and Connie Hines. Written by Alexander Richards, it contains 1959-vintage stock car race footage.

Filmed at a number of small dirt ovals in the South, the film is set in the 1959 edition of NASCAR's Southern 500 at Darlington Raceway in Darlington, South Carolina.

== Plot ==
A stock-car veteran (Rory Calhoun) teaches a grease monkey to race in the Southern 500 in Darlington, S.C.

== Cast ==
- Rory Calhoun as Mitch Cooper
- Alan Hale, Jr. as Buddy Schaeffer
- Connie Hines as Rene York
- Race Gentry as Les York (billed as John Gentry)
- Ed McGrath as Reichert
- Troyanne Ross as Kay Hill
- Helen Downey as Eve Mason
- Van Casey as "Stoogie"
- Tripplie Wisecup as Myrtle Webb
- Carey Loftin as Tommy Webb
- Billie Langston as "Peaches"
- Ann Stevens as Singer
- George Rembert, Jr. as Junior Thorsen
- Olwen Roney as Motel Manager
- Richard Taylor as Higgins
- George Fordham as Waiter

== Production ==
All filming was done during 1959 with much of the footage taken during the actual event. A film car was entered to capture on-track sequences and Rory Calhoun actually ran some laps during the race. Calhoun drives a two-tone 1957 Chevrolet, with a blue body and white top, while his friend-turned-competitor "Les York" is in a 1959 Oldsmobile.

The film is a "B" grade production in terms of budget but Thunder in Carolina managed to capture much of the sound and fury of the era.

== Release ==
The film had its opening engagements on June 7, 1960, in Darlington, Florence and Hartsville, South Carolina.

The film was later marketed on home video as Hard Drivin' with a freeze-frame title spliced into the opening.

== Reception ==
It grossed $271,847 in its first week in a 100 theater saturation release in the Carolinas. The film was released nationally on July 15, 1960. Quentin Tarantino is a fan of the film.

== See also ==
- List of American films of 1960
