= Left Handed Johnny West =

1965 film

- Directed by: Gianfranco Parolini
- Written by: José Luis Jerez Aloza
- Story by: Gianfranco Parolini
- Starring: Mimmo Palmara
- Cinematography: Francesco Izzarelli
- Music by: Angelo Francesco Lavagnino
- Release date: 1965
- Running time: 109 minutes
- Country: Italy
- Language: Italian

Left Handed Johnny West (Italian: Johnny West il mancino, also known just as Johnny West) is a 1965 Italian Spaghetti Western film directed by Gianfranco Parolini.

== Plot ==
Johnny West is a half-breed and a dreaded shooter. In the village where he comes, two brothers spread fear and terror with a group of unscrupulous men. So they have a goldmine owner in their power and try to become heir of his assets. Even with Johnny West they are doing a bad game, so that he is put in jail instead of them for bank robbery. However, he can break out and decimate the bandits with the help of two dealers. Then he captures the two brothers, shoots them and returns the stolen money to the owners. He then rides on new adventures.

== Cast ==
- Mimmo Palmara as Jonny West (as Dick Palmer)
- Adriano Micantoni as Jefferson (as Mike Anthony)
- Roger Delaporte as Don Trent
- André Bollet as Brad McCoy
- Mara Cruz as Anne Rose
- Dada Gallotti as Ginger (as Diana Garsón)
- Barta Barri
- Roberto Camardiel as Dusty
- Bob Felton as Jimmy
