= The Vengeance of Pancho Villa =

1967 film

- Film poster
- Spanish: Los 7 de Pancho Villa
- Directed by: José María Elorrieta
- Screenplay by: Manuel Sebares Caso
- Produced by: Sidney W. Pink; Félix Sánchez; Ricardo Vázquez
- Starring: John Ericson; Mara Cruz; Nuria Torray; Gustavo Rojo
- Cinematography: Alfonso Nieva
- Edited by: Antonio Ramírez de Loaysa
- Music by: Federico Contreras
- Production companies: Lacy Internacional Films; Cinemagic Inc.
- Distributed by: Cooperativa Cinematográfica de Distribución; Ring-Film-Verleih; D.C. Films
- Release date: 12 September 1967 (Spain)
- Running time: 91 minutes
- Country: Spain
- Language: Spanish

The Vengeance of Pancho Villa (Spanish: Los 7 de Pancho Villa or Los siete de Pancho Villa) is a 1967 Spanish Western film directed by José María Elorrieta, scored by Federico Contreras and starred by John Ericson, Nuria Torray and Gustavo Rojo.

== Cast ==
- Nuria Torray as María
- John Ericson as Don Diego Alvarado/Diego Owens
- Mara Cruz as Vera Stevens
- Gustavo Rojo as General Urbina
- Juan Antonio Peral as Juárez
- Fernando Curiel as Chaves
- Reginal Guilliams as Salas
- Guillermo Méndez as Camacho
- José Luis Lluch as Mudo
- Regina de Julián as Juana
- Rosa Girón as Rosita
- Mario Losier
- Beatriz Savón as a Cantina Girl
- Pastor Serrador as Manuel Sierra
- Antonio Jiménez Escribano as Colonel Hidalgo
- James Philbrook as Sheriff of Cerezo
- Ricardo Palacios as Pancho Villa
