= Kirsten Passer =

Danish actress (1930–2012)

- Born: 13 March 1930; Nårup, Assens Municipality, Denmark
- Died: 22 March 2012 (aged 82); Copenhagen, Denmark
- Occupation: Actress
- Years active: 1955–1976

Kirsten Passer (13 March 1930 – 22 March 2012) was a Danish film actress. She appeared in 29 films between 1955 and 1976. She was born in Nårup, Denmark. She is the sister of Danish actor Dirch Passer.

== Filmography ==
- Brand-Børge rykker ud (1976)
- Der må være en sengekant (1975)
- Romantik på sengekanten (1973)
- Motorvej på sengekanten (1972)
- Rektor på sengekanten (1972)
- Tandlæge på sengekanten (1971)
- Sangen om den røde rubin (1970)
- Far laver sovsen (1967)
- Mig og min lillebror (1967)
- Min kones ferie (1967)
- Flådens friske fyre (1965)
- Passer passer piger (1965)
- Når enden er go' (1964)
- Pigen og pressefotografen (1963)
- Der brænder en ild (1962)
- Far til fire med fuld musik (1961)
- Poeten og Lillemor i forårshumør (1961)
- Mine tossede drenge (1961)
- Elefanter på loftet (1960)
- Far til fire på Bornholm (1959)
- Vagabonderne på Bakkegården (1958)
- Far til fire og ulveungerne (1958)
- Ung kærlighed (1958)
- Far til fire og onkel Sofus (1957)
- Natlogi betalt (1957)
- Far til fire i byen (1956)
- Den kloge mand (1956)
- Taxa K 1640 efterlyses (1956)
- Altid ballade (1955)
