= Connie Hines =

American actress (1931–2009)

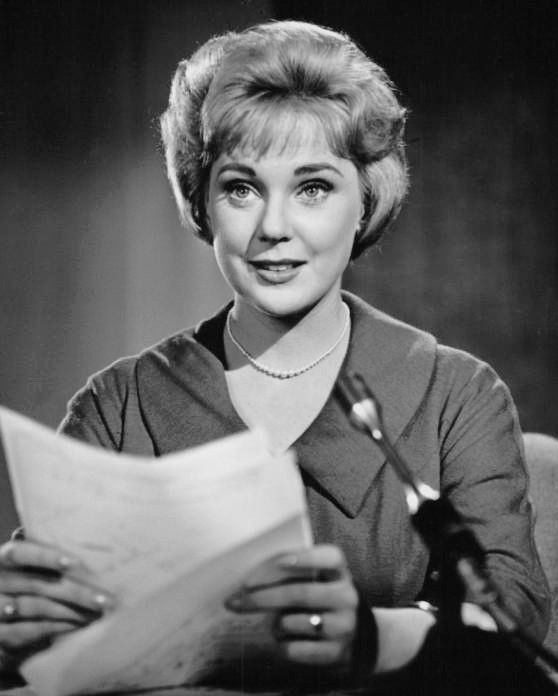
- publicity photograph for Mister Ed (1961)
- Born: March 24, 1931; Dedham, Massachusetts, U.S.
- Died: December 18, 2009 (aged 78); Beverly Hills, California, U.S.
- Occupation: Actress
- Years active: 1959–1971
- Spouse(s): Arthur Higgs (m. 1951; div. 1956) Lee Savin (m. 1970; died 1995)

Connie Hines (March 24, 1931 – December 18, 2009) was an American actress best known for co-starring on the 1960s sitcom Mister Ed.

== Life and career ==
Hines was one of four children born in Dedham in Norfolk County, Massachusetts, to an actress mother and a Boston-based teacher/acting coach father. As a child, she appeared in many of her father's stock-company plays. A member of the class of 1948 at Dedham High School, she was voted the most popular girl in her class. She tried out unsuccessfully for a part in the senior class play.

After her father's death, Hines married an insurance agent and moved to Jacksonville, Florida. She worked as a model and as a radio and stage actress there, with her own programs on WMBR-TV, and joined a stock company in Miami. By the time she was divorced, Hines traveled to New York City to study with the Helen Hayes Equity Group. When she came to Hollywood, she began acting with a role on an episode of the syndicated television series Whirlybirds. Hines' first film role was in 1960's Thunder in Carolina. She also appeared in 1960 episodes of Sea Hunt and M Squad.

Hines made a guest appearance on the CBS western series Johnny Ringo as Lily in the episode "The Assassins." She also guested on an episode of Bachelor Father and made two guest appearances on Perry Mason. In 1960 she played defendant Lucy Stevens in "The Case of the Singular Double," then later played Sandra Dalgran, the wife of a murder victim, in a 1962 episode, "The Case of the Counterfeit Crank."

Hines was cast as Lucy Bridges in the 1960 episode "Chicota Landing" of the Darren McGavin NBC western series Riverboat, along with Richard Chamberlain as a United States Army lieutenant.

=== Mister Ed ===
Hines auditioned for and won the role of Wilbur Post's wife Carol on Mister Ed, which was her best-known character. According to Alan Young, who portrayed Wilbur, Hines' role was "a tough chore," as the storylines focused more on the relationship of Wilbur and Mister Ed (the talking horse) than her. Around the same time, she took some acting, dancing and music classes. She continued on Mister Ed until the series ended in 1966, then took guest parts on television shows such as Love, American Style; Bonanza; and The Mod Squad before she retired in 1971.

Young and Hines performed together in 1996 in Irvine, California, in the two-person play Love Letters, which deals with the correspondence of a man and woman over fifty years.

== Personal life ==
Hines' first marriage was to insurance agent Arthur "Byrl" Higgs, which ended in divorce in the 1950s after the couple had relocated to Florida. Following the divorce, she moved to New York City to pursue acting. In 1970, she married Lee Savin, an entertainment lawyer and producer. They remained together until Savin's death in 1995.

In July 1961, she returned with great fanfare to her hometown of Dedham. She rode into Dedham Square in a convertible with a Dedham Police Department escort. The red carpet was rolled out for her in front of Memorial Hall. Town officials gave her a Key to the Town and Ralph Eaton, her principal at Dedham High School, presented her with a bouquet of roses. She later hosted a reception at Hotel 128 for her high school classmates.

== Death ==
Hines died from heart problems on December 18, 2009, at her home in Beverly Hills, California.
