= Too Soon to Love =

- Theatrical poster
- Directed by: Richard Rush
- Screenplay by: László Görög; Richard Rush
- Story by: László Görög; Richard Rush; Francis Ford Coppola
- Produced by: Mark Lipsky; Richard Rush
- Starring: Jennifer West; Richard Evans
- Cinematography: William C. Thompson
- Edited by: Stefan Arnsten
- Music by: Ronald Stein
- Production company: Dynasty
- Distributed by: Universal Pictures
- Release date: February 1960
- Running time: 85 minutes
- Country: United States
- Language: English
- Budget: $50,000

Too Soon to Love, also known as High School Honeymoon and Teenage Lovers, is a 1960 American exploitation film directed by Richard Rush and starring Richard Evans, Jennifer West and Jack Nicholson.

The film was considered by some critics as among the first of the American "new wave" of filmmaking.

== Premise ==
The film is about the romantic relationship between a woman and a man, barely out of their teens, and another man named Buddy (Nicholson) who tries to steal her away from him.

== Cast ==
- Jennifer West as Cathy Taylor
- Richard Evans as Jim Mills
- Warren Parker as Mr. Taylor
- Ralph Manza as Hughie Wineman
- Jack Nicholson as Buddy
- Billie Bird as Mrs. Jefferson

== Production ==
The film was made for $50,000. It was Francis Ford Coppola's first writing assignment and director Richard Rush said "he had more youth than discipline."

Jack Nicholson was cast off the back of his appearance in The Cry Baby Killer. He would make two more films with Rush.

The film was sold to Universal for $250,000.
