= Gustavo Rojo =

Mexican actor (1923–2017)

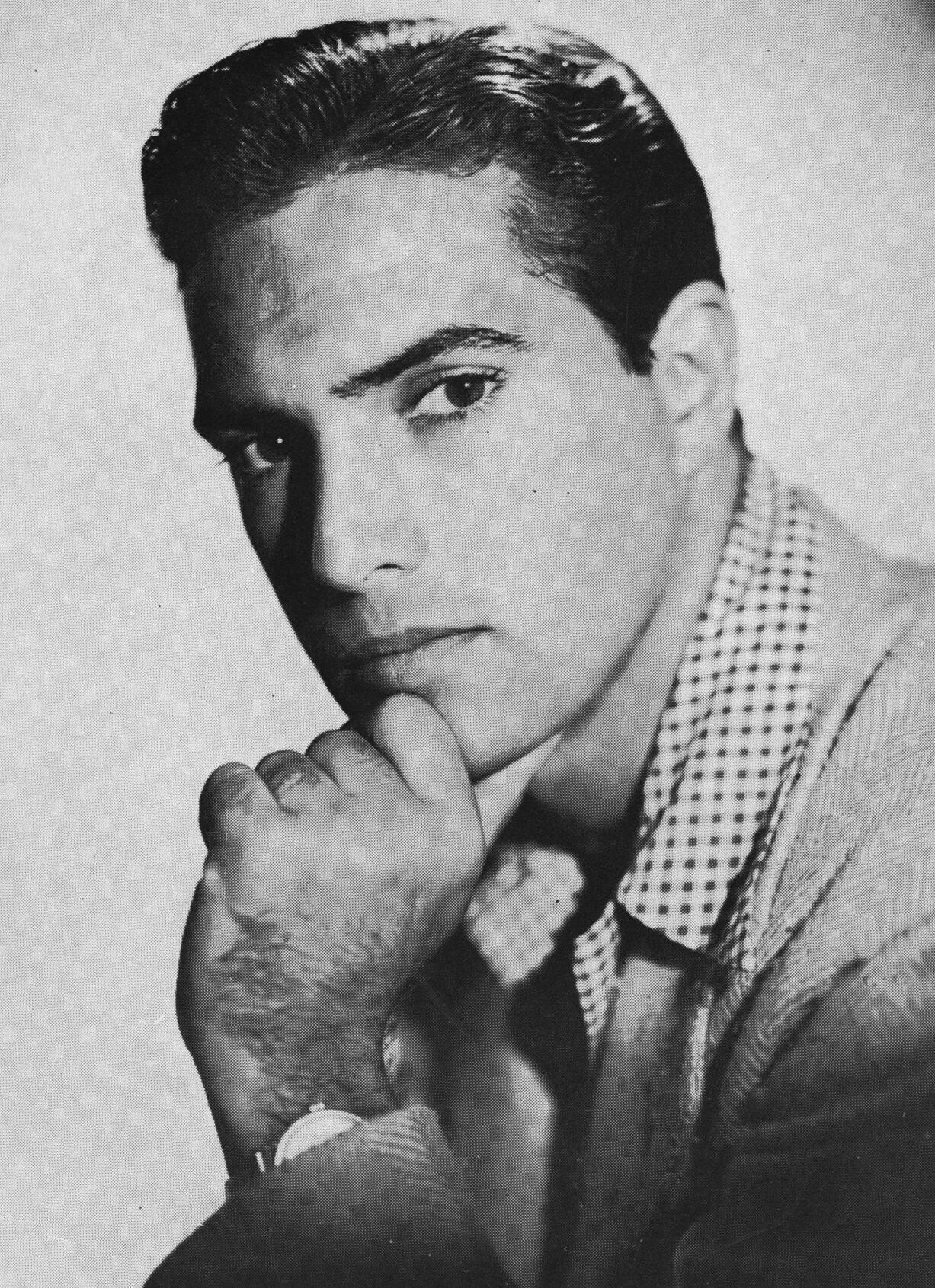
- Rojo in 1954
- Born: Gustavo Rojo Pinto; 5 September 1923; Atlantic Ocean
- Died: 22 April 2017 (aged 93); Mexico City, Mexico
- Occupations: Actor; Film producer
- Years active: 1938–2017
- Spouses: Mercedes Castellanos (m. 1943; died 1954) Erika Remberg (m. 1959; div. 1967) Carmela Stein (m. 1975)
- Children: Alejandra, Enrique, Juan Carlos; Ana Patricia Rojo

Gustavo Rojo Pinto (5 September 1923 – 22 April 2017) was a Mexican actor.

== Life and career ==
Gustavo Rojo was born on 5 September 1923 on a German ship in the middle of the Atlantic Ocean. His mother was the prominent Spanish author Mercedes Pinto, who emigrated to Uruguay for political reasons. His two older siblings, Pituka de Foronda and Ruben Rojo, also became actors. In the late 1920s, Mercedes wrote a play and Gustavo made his theater debut. Gustavo's screen debut came as a child actor in the 1938 Cuban film Ahora seremos felices, in which his older sister Pituka had a starring role. In the 1940s, the family moved to Mexico, where Rojo worked steadily throughout the 1940s.

In 1947, he made his Hollywood debut in the film Tarzan and the Mermaids, which starred Johnny Weissmuller and Brenda Joyce.

Rojo was engaged to Austrian actress Erika Remberg in 1958. He died on 22 April 2017 at the age of 93.

== Selected filmography ==
=== Film ===
- Ahora seremos felices (1938) as Radio Station boy #1 (uncredited)
- Mis hijos (1944) as Luis
- Murallas de pasión (1944)
- Amok (1944)
- Una canción en la noche (1945)
- Corazones de México (1945)
- Mamá Inés (1946)
- Las colegialas (1946) as Gabriel Solórzano
- El último amor de Goya (1946)
- A Insaciável (1947) as Mario
- Todo un caballero (1947) as Carlos Alcalde
- Tarzan and the Mermaids (1948) as Tiko
- Courtesan (1948)
- Barrio de pasiones (1948)
- Una mujer con pasado (1949) as Federico de Medina
- Cuando los padres se quedan solos (1949) as Fernando
- Eterna agonía (1949) as Humberto
- Cuando baja la marea (1949)
- Café de chinos (1949) as Enrique
- The Great Madcap (1949) as Eduardo de la Mata
- La virgen desnuda (1950)
- Un grito en la noche (1950)
- El sol sale para todos (1950)
- Te besaré en la boca (1950)
- Yo quiero ser tonta (1950) as Juan
- La reina del mambo (1951) as Luis
- The Cry of the Flesh (1951) as Roberto
- Doña Clarines (1951) as Miguel Castañeda / Luis
- Red Fury (1951) as Ramón Stevens
- Stronghold (1951)
- Cerca del cielo (1951)
- The Evil Forest (1951) as Parsifal
- From Madrid to Heaven (1952) as Pablo Iriarte
- Younger Brother (1953)
- Los que no deben nacer (1953)
- Under the Sky of Spain (1953)
- Borrasca en las almas (1954) as Rogelio del Moral
- La sobrina del señor cura (1954) as Bernabé
- Tehuantepec (1954)
- The Island Princess (1954) as Bentejui
- Angels of the Street (1954)
- La lupa (1955) as Carlos Iriarte
- La mujer ajena (1955)
- Alexander the Great (1956) as Cleitus the Black
- Engaged to Death (1957) as Pietro
- Action of the Tiger (1957) as Henri Malvoisie
- La guerra empieza en Cuba (1957) as Capitán Javier Romero
- Desnúdate, Lucrecia (1958) as Nicolás de la Fuente
- Secretaria peligrosa (1958)
- Il romanzo di un giovane povero (1958) as Massimo
- La tirana (1958) as Vizconde de Acarí / Conde de San Esteban del Río
- Parque de Madrid (1959)
- It Started with a Kiss (1959) as Antonio Soriano
- María de la O (1959) as Don Luís Suárez
- S.O.S., abuelita (1959)
- The Miracle (1959) as Cordoba
- Juicio final (1960)
- Schön ist die Liebe am Königssee (1961) as Ronald Twiss
- La grande vallata (1961)
- El amor empieza en sábado (1961) as Mr. White
- Schlagerrevue 1962 (1961) as Ferdinand Sander
- Julius Caesar Against the Pirates (1962) as Julius Caesar
- Il capitano di ferro (1962) as Furio
- Murder in Rio (1963) as Dumont
- The Secret of Dr. Mabuse (1964) as Mario Monta
- No Survivors, Please (1964) as Armand de Guedez
- Old Shatterhand (1964) as Corporal Bush
- The Treasure of the Aztecs (1965) as Teniente Potoca
- Genghis Khan (1965) as Altan
- The Pyramid of the Sun God (1965) as Teniente Potoca
- Wild Kurdistan (1965) as Ahmed El Corda
- El marqués (1965) as Director of the Casino
- Kingdom of the Silver Lion (1965) as Ahmed El Corda
- Come to the Blue Adriatic (1966) as Sr. Hernandez
- Europa canta (1966) as Chief Big Vulture
- Seven Vengeful Women (1966) as Gus Macintosh
- Django Does Not Forgive (1966)
- Kitosh: The Man Who Came From The North (1967) as José
- A Witch Without a Broom (1967) as Caius
- The Fickle Finger of Fate (1967) as Estrala
- The Christmas Kid (1967) as Mayor Louis Carillo
- Spy Today, Die Tomorrow (1967) as Peppino
- The Vengeance of Pancho Villa (1967) as General Urbina
- Ragan (1968) as Velludo
- Madigan's Millions (1968) as Lt. Arco
- Battle of the Last Panzer (1969)
- The Valley of Gwangi (1969) as Carlos dos Orsos
- A Bullet for Sandoval (1969) as Guadalupano
- El niño y el potro (Más allá de río Miño) (1969) as Andrés
- Land Raiders (1970) as Juantez
- El Condor (1970) as Colonel Anguinaldo
- El último día de la guerra (1970) as Pvt. Hawk
- El hombre que vino del odio (1971)
- Natacha (1971) as Raúl
- Gracia y el forastero (1974)
- Hermanos de sangre (1974)
- Divorcio a la andaluza (1975)
- El compadre más padre (1976)
- El látigo (1978)
- Cuando tejen las arañas (1979) as Padre de Laura
- Reventon en Acapulco (1982)
- La golfa del barrio (1982)
- Corrupción (1984) as Dr. Antonio Arenas
- De puro relajo (1986)
- Solicito marido para engañar (1988) as Ángel
- Sabor a mí (1988)
- Venganza juvenil (1988)
- El cornudo soy yo (1989)
- Fuera de la ley (1998)

=== Telenovelas ===
- No creo en los hombres (1969) as Roberto
- Natacha (1970-1971) (Perú) as Raúl Pereyra
- El amor tiene cara de mujer (1971) as Cristián
- ¿Quién? (1973)
- Muñeca (1974) as Padre Félix
- Mundo de juguete (1974-1977) as Carlos
- La tierra (1974-1975)
- Marcha nupcial (1977) as Esteban
- Una mujer (1978) as Manuel
- La divina Sarah (1980) as Richepin
- Lágrimas de amor (1980) as Germán
- Secreto de confesión (1980) as Jorge
- Una limosna de amor (1981) as Rolando
- Mañana es primavera (1982) as Alfredo Serrano
- Sí, mi amor (1984) as Sr. Edward Williams
- Pobre señorita Limantour (1987)
- Rosa salvaje (1987-1988) as Padre Manuel de la Huerta
- María Mercedes (1992-1993) as Dr. Pérez
- Si Dios me quita la vida (1995) as Don Jesús Sánchez Amaro
- Confidente de secundaria (1996) as Miramontes
- Mi querida Isabel (1996-1997) as Joaquín
- Esmeralda (1997) as Bernardo Pérez-Montalvo
- Sin ti (1997-1998) as Don Nicolás Rubio-Castillo
- Salud, dinero y amor (1997) as Federico Montiel
- Soñadoras (1998-1999) as Don Alfredo Guzmán
- Alma rebelde (1999) as Octavio Fuentes Cano
- Cuento de Navidad (1999) as Mariano
- Carita de ángel (2000-2001) as Padre Cosme
- Por un beso (2000) as Lic. Carlos Guillén
- La intrusa (2001) as Víctor Rivadeneyra
- Cómplices al rescate (2002) as Dr. Federico Rueda
- Apuesta por un amor (2004-2005) as Lic. Leonardo de la Rosa
- Destilando amor (2007) as Néstor Videgaray
- Al diablo con los guapos (2007-2008) as Ernesto Robledo
- Mañana es para siempre (2008-2009) as Obispo
- Corazón salvaje (2009-2010) as Alberto Villarreal
- Triunfo del amor (2010-2011) as Padre Jerónimo
- Abismo de pasión (2012) as Obispo
- Qué pobres tan ricos (2013-2014) as Aureliano Ruizpalacios
- Un camino hacia el destino (2016) as Don Fernando

=== Television series ===
- Straightaway, episode "The Racer and the Lady" as Salamanca (1961)
