= Flame Over Vietnam =

1957 film by José María Elorrieta

- Spanish: Una cruz en el infierno
- Directed by: José María Elorrieta
- Written by: John Davis Hart
- Screenplay by: Rafael J. Salvia
- Story by: José María Elorrieta
- Produced by: Sidney W. Pink
- Starring: José Nieto; Elena Barrios; Manolo Morán; María Martín
- Cinematography: Miguel Fernández Mila
- Edited by: Félix Suárez Inclán
- Music by: Fernando García Morcillo
- Production companies: Universitas Films; Universum Film; Westside International Films
- Distributed by: Producers Releasing Organization; Aparicio
- Release date: 29 July 1957
- Running time: 95 min
- Country: Spain

Flame Over Vietnam, Original title: Una cruz en el infierno, is a 1957 Spanish film directed by José María Elorrieta.

== Plot ==
A nun arrives at a religious mission in the middle of the First Indochina War and soon becomes friends with refugee children. One day, a trafficker is injured and taken to the mission, where he falls in love with the nun.

== Cast ==
- Elena Barrios as Hermana Esperanza
- José Nieto as Laszlo
- Manolo Morán as Hermano Bartolomé
- Nicolás D. Perchicot as Padre Elías
- Vicente Ávila as Hart
- Félix Dafauce as Ericson
- Rosita Palomares as Selma
- María Martín as Mariela
- Miguel Ángel Reina
- Francisco Vilay
- Severo Somontes
- Rubén Bantú
- José Luis Rico
- Manuel Rojas
- Conchita as child
- Nicasio as child
- Bienvenido Antonio as child
- Expedito Claravall as child
- María Mayor as child
- Conchita Muller as child
