= John Acheson (actor) =

British actor (1934–1997)

John Acheson Naylor
- Born: John Acheson Naylor; 31 March 1934; Nottingham, Nottinghamshire, England
- Died: 15 September 1997 (aged 63); London, England
- Occupation: Actor

John Acheson Naylor (31 March 1934 – 15 September 1997) was a British actor whose screen career extended from 1970 to 1976. He appeared on television and in the 1970 film You Can't Win 'Em All. He is known for playing Major Beresford in the 1976 Doctor Who story The Seeds of Doom.

After acting, Acheson became a public relations officer for a London travel agent.

== Boxing ==
A former Army boxing champion, Acheson fought petrol chain owner and businessman Kevin Reardon in 1979. The two had a disagreement over the price of the actor's eight-bedroom 17th century home and seven acres of land in the Sussex village of Whatlington. The actor was asking for £85,000 while the businessman wanted to pay £75,000. Therefore, the two men settled it out in a boxing match within a makeshift ring on the lawn of the garden (the home having formerly belonged to Acheson's father, who was Dean of Battle). During the fight, Acheson was floored 16 times. By the end of the second right and after four minutes of fighting, Reardon asked for a draw, which his opponent agreed to. In the end, the two men settled on a price of £80,000. The match was done in good fun, attracting the locals with the local garage dealer acting as referee, an estate agent acting as timekeeper and a doctor on hand.

== Filmography ==
Year	Title	Role	Notes	Ref.
1969	A Candidate for a Killing			
1969	Department S	Captain of Aircraft	Episode: "The Bones of Byrom Blain"	
1970	The Persuaders!	Triver	Episode: "Overture"	
1970	You Can't Win 'Em All	Davis	Feature film	
1976	Doctor Who	Major Beresford	Serial: The Seeds of Doom (parts 5 & 6)	
