= The Emerald of Artatama =

- VHS cover
- Directed by: José María Elorrieta
- Written by: José María Elorrieta; Manuel Martínez Remís; Rafael Moreno Alba; Alejandro Vera
- Produced by: Sidney W. Pink; Félix Sánchez
- Starring: Rory Calhoun; Nuria Torray; James Philbrook; Bridgette Saint John; Esperanza Roy
- Cinematography: Alfonso Nieva
- Edited by: Antonio Ramírez de Loaysa
- Music by: Federico Contreras
- Distributed by: Troma Entertainment
- Release date: 1969
- Running time: 89 minutes
- Country: Spain
- Language: Spanish

The Emerald of Artatama (also known as La Muchacha del Nilo and The Girl of the Nile) is a 1969 adventure film directed by José María Elorrieta and distributed by Troma Entertainment.

The film stars Rory Calhoun as a con man searching after the Tomb of Artatama, rumoured to be home of a legendary emerald.

In a 1986 VHS release by Applause Production Inc. it was mistakenly titled The Emerald of Aratama.

== Cast ==
- Nuria Torray as Aysha
- Rory Calhoun as Jack Cooper
- Pilar Arenas as Mary Stevenson
- Esperanza Roy as Isabel
- James Philbrook as James
- Nacho Pidal as Omar
- Francisco Braña as Terry
- José A. Peral as Fedor
- Antonio Jiménez Escribano as Jeque Ibrahim
- Ramón Centenero as Hombre de Fedor
- Guillermo Méndez as Petersen
- Manuel Ruiz
- Ramón Lillo as Hombre de Alfieri
- José Luis Lluch as Max
- Charles Fawcett as Marco Alfieri
- Mona Ibrahin as Dancer
- Brigitte St. John as Brigitte
- Seramis as Dancer
