= Richard Rush (director) =

American film director (1929–2021)

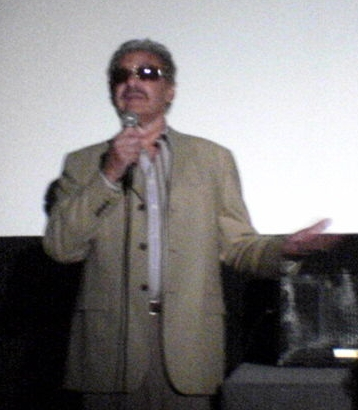
- Richard Rush
- Born: April 15, 1929; New York City, U.S.
- Died: April 8, 2021 (aged 91); Los Angeles, California, U.S.
- Occupations: Film director, producer, screenwriter
- Years active: 1960–2001

Richard Rush (April 15, 1929 – April 8, 2021) was an American film director, scriptwriter, and producer. He is known for directing the 1980 black comedy film The Stunt Man, for which he received a nomination for the Academy Award for Best Director.

Starting his directing career in 1960, he also directed Freebie and the Bean (1974), a police buddy comedy/drama starring Alan Arkin and James Caan. His 1994 erotic thriller film, Color of Night, won a Golden Raspberry Award as the worst film of 1994, but Maxim magazine also singled the film out as having the best sex scene in film history. He co-wrote the screenplay for the 1990 film Air America.

== Biography ==
=== Early life ===
Rush was born on April 15, 1929. According to his widow, his parents were Russian immigrants, and were known as Ray and Nina Rush. His father owned bookstores in New York and Los Angeles, where Rush grew up.

After graduation, Rush worked in the filmmaking unit for the United States Air Force showcasing the nation's involvement in the Korean War, which he once labeled as "propaganda". When his military-related work was finished, Rush went to the University of California, Los Angeles. He opened a production company to produce commercials and industrial films.

=== Early features ===
In his thirties, Rush got inspired by the neo-realism of French director François Truffaut's The 400 Blows, selling his production business to finance his first feature Too Soon to Love (1960), which he produced on a shoestring budget of $50,000 and sold to Universal Pictures for distribution for $250,000. It featured an early film appearance by Jack Nicholson (who starred in two later Rush films, Hells Angels on Wheels and Psych-Out).

Rush wanted to follow it with an adaptation of Whatever Happened to Baby Jane? but did not end up making the film. He was also attached to Kitten with a Whip early on. Rush then directed Of Love and Desire (1963) with Merle Oberon.

=== Exploitation films ===
Rush's third movie, A Man Called Dagger (1966), was a spy picture and his first collaboration with cinematographer László Kovács. Rush directed a car racing film for American International Pictures, Thunder Alley (1967), starring Fabian Forte and Annette Funicello. He did The Fickle Finger of Fate (1967) for Sidney W. Pink starring Tab Hunter, then did a biker movie for Joe Solomon, Hells Angels on Wheels (1967), starring Nicholson.

Rush was signed by Dick Clark to make two more films for AIP: Psych-Out (1968), a film about the counter culture starring Nicholson and Susan Strasberg, and a biker movie, The Savage Seven (1968).

=== Studio films ===
Rush signed a deal with Columbia Pictures. His first studio effort was 1970's Getting Straight, starring Elliott Gould and Candice Bergen. The film did well commercially and was deemed by Swedish director Ingmar Bergman to be the "best American film of the decade."

Rush's next 1974 movie, Freebie and the Bean, was for the most part critically panned; however, it was enormously popular with audiences, grossing $12.5 million at the box office on a $3 million budget in the two years following its release.

Rush was hired to direct One Flew Over the Cuckoo's Nest (1975) after its original director Miloš Forman was placed under increasing censorship and StB surveillance by the normalization-era Communist Party government of Czechoslovakia. However, he was replaced by Hal Ashby after he was unable to secure studio funding, and Ashby was later replaced by Forman after he fled to the United States.

=== The Stunt Man ===
In 1981, Truffaut was asked "Who is your favorite American director?" He answered, "I don't know his name, but I saw his film last night and it was called The Stunt Man." The film was a slapstick comedy, a thriller, a romance, an action-adventure, and a commentary on America's dismissal of veterans, as well as a deconstruction of Hollywood cinema. The film also features Rush's typical protagonist, an emotionally traumatized male who has escaped the traditional frameworks of society only to find his new world (biker gangs in Hells Angels on Wheels, hippies in Psych-Out) corrupted by the same influences. The Stunt Man won Rush Oscar nominations for best director and best script (co-nominated with Lawrence B. Marcus).

=== Later career ===
Rush originally wanted to direct the horror comedy Love at First Bite (1979) as his first film after The Stunt Man, but was replaced by Stan Dragoti. In 1985, Rush was hired by Carolco Pictures to direct Air America (1990) with Sean Connery and Kevin Costner starring. When the film was delayed to avoid competition with Good Morning, Vietnam (1987) and when Connery and Costner's salaries became too expensive, Rush was paid full salary to walk away from the project by Daniel Melnick. This allowed the studio to cast Mel Gibson and Robert Downey Jr. and turn the film into a success, grossing nearly double its budget.

Rush did not direct another film for four years, until Color of Night. Conflicts with Andrew G. Vajna over the final cut were so turbulent that Rush suffered a near-fatal heart attack. Eventually they compromised, where Vajna's suggestions for the film were released onto theaters while Rush's "director's cut" (which was 18 minutes longer) would be released onto home video. The film was a financial failure with audiences, but it found a second life on video; the film also won "Best Sex Scene in film history" award from Maxim magazine; Rush was very proud of the award, and he kept the award in his bathroom.

Afterward, Rush retreated from the world of commercial cinema. As Kenneth Turan of Los Angeles Times wrote, Rush's career seems to be "followed by the kind of miserable luck that never seems to afflict the untalented." His last project was a DVD documentary on the making of The Stunt Man entitled The Sinister Saga of Making The Stunt Man (2001).

He resided in Bel Air with his wife Claudia. He had an older brother, Dr. Stephen Rush, who also resided in Los Angeles. On April 8, 2021, Rush died a week shy of his 92nd birthday at his Los Angeles home after long-term health problems.

== Filmography ==
Year	Title	Director	Writer	Producer
1960	Too Soon to Love	Yes	Yes	Yes
1963	Of Love and Desire	Yes	Yes	No
1967	Thunder Alley	Yes	No	No
1967	Hells Angels on Wheels	Yes	No	No
1967	The Fickle Finger of Fate	Yes	No	No
1968	Psych-Out	Yes	No	No
1968	The Savage Seven	Yes	No	No
1968	A Man Called Dagger	Yes	No	No
1970	Getting Straight	Yes	No	Yes
1974	Freebie and the Bean	Yes	No	Yes
1980	The Stunt Man	Yes	Yes	Yes
1990	Air America	No	Yes	No
1994	Color of Night	Yes	No	No
2000	The Sinister Saga of Making "The Stunt Man"	Yes	Yes	Yes
