= X (2002 film) =

- Theatrical release poster
- Directed by: Luis Marías
- Screenplay by: Luis Marías
- Starring: Antonio Resines; Esperanza Roy; María Adánez; Manuel Galiana; Pere Arquillué; Antonio Dechent; Marta Belaustegui
- Cinematography: Federico Ribes
- Edited by: Fidel Collados
- Music by: Paco Musulén; Luis Elices
- Production company: BocaBoca
- Distributed by: Columbia TriStar Films de España
- Release date: 14 June 2002
- Country: Spain
- Language: Spanish

X is a 2002 Spanish mystery thriller film directed and written by Luis Marías which stars Antonio Resines, Esperanza Roy, and María Adánez.

== Plot ==
Failing to remember events after a drunken night and awakening in an unknown bed with blackmailer Natalia, cop Javier goes through his own personal hell as he becomes the prime suspect behind the killing of a young homosexual man, meeting up with the deceased's lame and resentful sister Alicia.

== Cast ==
- Antonio Resines as Javier
- Esperanza Roy as Natalia
- María Adánez as Alicia
- Manuel Galiana as Fernando
- Pere Arquillué
- Antonio Dechent
- Marta Belaustegui as Beatriz

== Production ==
The film is a BocaBoca production. It was shot in the Summer of 2000.

== Release ==
Distributed by Columbia TriStar Spain, the film was released theatrically in Spain on 14 June 2002.

== Reception ==
Casimiro Torreiro of El País deemed the film to be "a more than stimulating first work", "with an inspiration that is not abundant in the scripts of criminal films [in Spanish cinema], actors adjusted to their rather thankless roles and a plot that locks its protagonist in a suffocating incriminating circle".

Jonathan Holland of Variety deemed the film to be "efficient and well-played, with sharp and silly plot twists in equal measure", but featuring "little else to generate enthusiasm in what is basically another riff on the battered cop theme".

== See also ==
- List of Spanish films of 2002
