= The Saga of Hemp Brown =

1958 film by Richard Carlson

- Film poster
- Directed by: Richard Carlson
- Screenplay by: Robert Creighton Williams (as Bob Williams)
- Story by: Bernard Girard
- Produced by: Gordon Kay
- Starring: Rory Calhoun; Beverly Garland
- Cinematography: Philip H. Lathrop
- Edited by: Tony Martinelli
- Color process: Eastmancolor
- Production company: Universal International Pictures
- Distributed by: Universal Pictures
- Release dates: June 26, 1958 (Los Angeles-Premiere); October 1, 1958 (United States)
- Running time: 80 minutes
- Country: United States
- Language: English

The Saga of Hemp Brown is a 1958 American CinemaScope Western film directed by Richard Carlson and starring Rory Calhoun and Beverly Garland.

== Plot ==
A U.S. cavalry officer, Hemp Brown (Rory Calhoun), runs into some serious trouble when the party of civilians and troops he's bringing to a nearby Army fort is ambushed. A woman is killed during the gunfight, and money is stolen by the bandits. The leader of the gang, Jed Givens (John Larch), is an acquaintance of Brown, who implicates the fugitive during the subsequent trial. But Brown is court-martialed and booted from the Army. Brown tracks down Givens to restore honor to his name.

== Cast ==
- Rory Calhoun as Hemp Brown
- Beverly Garland as Mona Langley
- John Larch aa Jed Givens
- Russell Johnson as Hook
- Fortunio Bonanova as Serge Bolanos
- Trevor Bardette as Judge Rawlins
- Morris Ankrum as Bo Slauter
- Addison Richards as Col. Ford
- Tom London as Floyd Leacock (uncredited)

== See also ==
- List of American films of 1958
