= The Yellow Tomahawk =

1954 film by Lesley Selander

- Theatrical release poster
- Directed by: Lesley Selander
- Screenplay by: Richard Alan Simmons
- Story by: Harold Jack Bloom
- Produced by: Howard W. Koch
- Starring: Rory Calhoun; Peggie Castle; Noah Beery, Jr. Warner Anderson; Peter Graves; Lee Van Cleef; Rita Moreno
- Cinematography: Gordon Avil
- Edited by: John F. Schreyer
- Music by: Les Baxter
- Production company: Bel-Air Productions
- Distributed by: United Artists
- Release date: May 1954
- Running time: 82 minutes
- Country: United States
- Language: English

The Yellow Tomahawk is a 1954 American Western film directed by Lesley Selander and written by Richard Alan Simmons. The film stars Rory Calhoun, Peggie Castle, Noah Beery, Jr., Warner Anderson, Peter Graves, Lee Van Cleef, and Rita Moreno. The film was released in May 1954, by United Artists.

== Plot ==
Scout and tracker Adam Reed is handed a yellow tomahawk by Cheyenne warrior Fire Knife to deliver to a U.S. Army fort commanded by Major Ives as a proclamation of war, a warning to evacuate women and children before the attack.

Ives is known as "the Butcher" for having given Cheyenne women and children no such warning during previous bloodshed. Ives scoffs at the tomahawk, and Adam decides the major's superior officers at another fort must be notified of his actions.

The only woman who heeds Adam's warning to leave is Kate Bohlen, sweetheart of Lt. Bascom, who misses her native Boston. An attack is mounted before Kate can safely get away. Adam is knocked unconscious, but Fire Knife makes sure his life is spared. Bascom and many others are killed.

Extending the bow as a gesture of peace, Adam appeals to Fire Knife to let the major's fate be left up to the Army's justice. Fire Knife's thirst for vengeance is too great, so he prepares to kill Ives, who in desperation reveals that he is actually of Cheyenne descent himself. Adam cannot allow Ives to be killed in cold blood, so he kills his Indian friend.

Riding off toward the next fort to report what has happened, Adam leaves with Kate as a humiliated Ives pleads with him not to reveal his secret.

== Cast ==
- Rory Calhoun as Adam
- Peggie Castle as Katherine
- Noah Beery, Jr. as Tonio
- Warner Anderson as Major Ives
- Peter Graves as Sawyer
- Lee Van Cleef as Fire Knife
- Rita Moreno as Honey Bear
- Dan Riss as Sgt. Bandini
- Walter Reed as Keats
- Patrick Sexton as Lt. Bascomb
- Robert Bray as Lieutenant Banion
- Adam Williams as Cpl. Maddock
- James Best as Private Bliss
- Ned Glass as Willy

== Production ==
Parts of the film were shot in Strawberry Valley, Kanab movie fort, Kanab Creek, Kanab Canyon, and Three Lakes in Utah.
