= Lágrimas de amor =

Mexican telenovela

- Genre: Telenovela
- Created by: Fernanda Villeli
- Written by: María Bandrich
- Directed by: Manuel Ruiz Esparza
- Starring: Alicia Rodríguez; Gustavo Rojo
- Country of origin: Mexico
- Original language: Spanish
- No. of episodes: 20

Production
- Executive producer: Irene Sabido
- Cinematography: Xavier Rojas
- Running time: 30 minutes

Original release
- Network: Canal de las Estrellas
- Release: 1980

Lágrimas de amor (English title: Tears of love) is a Mexican telenovela produced by Irene Sabido for Televisa in 1980.

== Cast ==
- Alicia Rodríguez as Camila
- Gustavo Rojo as German
- Virginia Manzano as Lidia
- Silvia Mariscal as Cecilia
- Fabian Lavalle as Raul
- Martha Roth as Luz
- Carlos Amador as Chucho
- Antonio Henaine as Gustavo
- Agustín López Zavala as Dr.Lazcano
- Leonor Llausas as Soledad
- Paloma Woolrich
