= Rory Calhoun =

American actor (1922–1999)

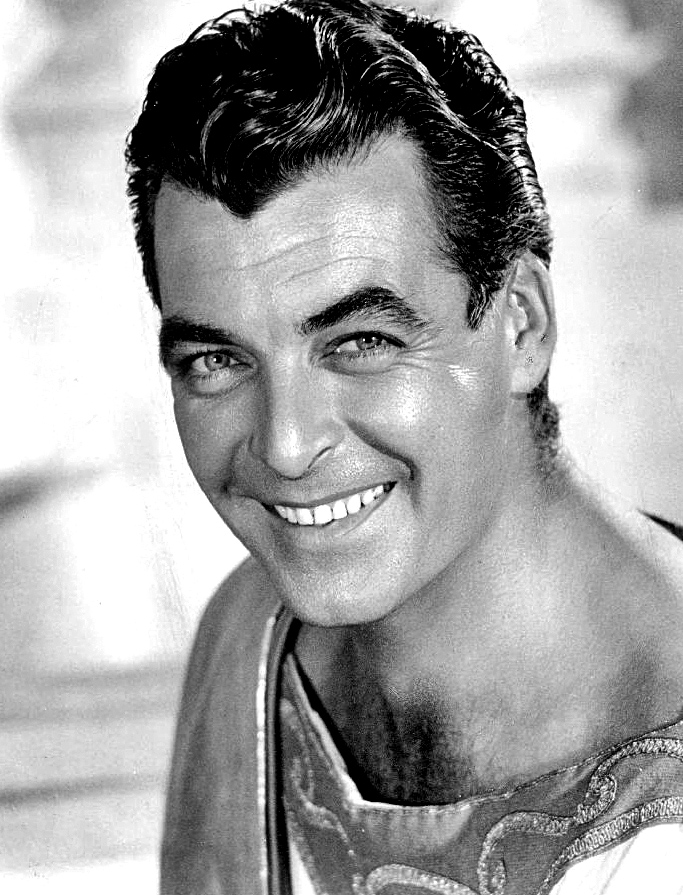
- Calhoun in 1961
- Born: Francis Timothy McCown; August 8, 1922; Los Angeles, California
- Died: April 28, 1999 (aged 76); Burbank, California, U.S.
- Other name: Smoke
- Occupation: Actor
- Years active: 1941–1993
- Known for: How to Marry a Millionaire; Motel Hell; Pure Country; Angel; River of No Return
- Spouse(s): Lita Baron (m. 1948; div. 1970) Sue Rhodes (m. 1971; div. 1979; m. 1982)
- Children: 5
- Awards: Hollywood Walk of Fame

Rory Calhoun (born Francis Timothy McCown, August 8, 1922 – April 28, 1999) was an American film and television actor. He starred in numerous Westerns in the 1950s and 1960s and appeared in supporting roles in films such as How to Marry a Millionaire (1953) and Motel Hell (1980).

== Life and career ==
=== 1922–1943: Troubled early life ===
Francis Timothy McCown was born in Los Angeles, California, the son of Elizabeth Cuthbert (1904–1968) and Floyd Conley McCown (1900–1985), a professional gambler. He spent his early years in Santa Cruz, California. He was of Irish ancestry. At age 13, he stole a revolver, for which he was sent to the California Youth Authority's Preston School of Industry reformatory at Ione, California. He escaped while in the adjustment center (jail within the jail).

He left home at 17 to escape beatings from his stepfather and began hot-wiring cars.

After robbing several jewelry stores, he stole a car and drove it across state lines. This was a federal offense, so when he was recaptured, he was sentenced to three years in prison. He served his sentence at the United States Medical Center for Federal Prisoners in Springfield, Missouri. He remained there until he was paroled shortly before his 21st birthday.

Calhoun worked at a number of odd jobs, including as a mechanic, logger in California's redwoods, hard-rock miner in Nevada, cowboy in Arizona, fisherman, truck driver, crane operator, and forest firefighter.

=== 1944–1945: Early acting credits as Frank McCown ===
In January 1944, he met actor Alan Ladd while riding horseback in the Hollywood Hills. Impressed with Calhoun's physique, Ladd introduced him to his wife Sue Carol, who was a talent agent. She arranged for him to have a screen test at 20th Century Fox, and he was cast in uncredited roles for Something for the Boys (1944) and Sunday Dinner for a Soldier (1944). He had a one-line role in a Laurel and Hardy comedy, The Bullfighters (1945), credited under the name Frank McCown.

He also appeared in Where Do We Go from Here? (1945), The Great John L. (1945) (as Gentleman Jim Corbett), and Nob Hill (1945).

"I liked the money it brought in," said Calhoun. "And I felt it would be nice to go back to forestry with a neat bank roll when these fellows found me out. I never had any feeling I'd make good."

=== 1945–1949: Change to Rory Calhoun and partnership with David O. Selznick ===
Shortly afterward, the Ladds hosted a party attended by David O. Selznick employee Henry Willson, an agent who was known for representing young actors. Willson signed McCown to a contract with Selznick's company Vanguard and his name was soon changed to Rory Calhoun. According to Calhoun, Selznick told him his first name should be "Rory... because you're a Leo, Leos are lions and lions roar." Selznick suggested either Donahue, Calhoun, or Callahan as a surname, and he picked Calhoun. (In another account of the story, Selznick named him "Rory" because he helped put out roaring fire blazes when a firefighter and "Calhoun" because it sounded Irish.)

Calhoun was under contract with Selznick's company Vanguard, being used to do screen tests and make public appearances. His first public appearance in the film capital was as Lana Turner's escort to the premiere of Alfred Hitchcock's Spellbound (1945), a Selznick production. The glamorous blonde and her handsome companion attracted the paparazzi, and photos appeared in newspapers and fan magazines.

In 1945, Calhoun returned to prison after punching a detective.

Calhoun did not appear in a film for a year before being lent to producer Sol Lesser for The Red House (1947) with Edward G. Robinson. He was then loaned to Paramount's Pine-Thomas second feature studio to play the lead in Adventure Island (1947) with fellow Selznick contractee Rhonda Fleming.

Calhoun was announced for a film called Jet Pilot with Fleming, Guy Madison, and other Selznick contract players, but it was not made. Instead, he was third lead in That Hagen Girl (1947) with Ronald Reagan and Shirley Temple.

Sam Newfield, who used Calhoun in Adventure Island, cast him again in Miraculous Journey (1948). For Monogram, Guy Madison and he were in Massacre River (1949). At Fox, Calhoun played a second lead in Sand (1949)

In February 1949, Selznick did a deal with Warner Bros., lending them seven of his stars, including Calhoun; they took over half his pictures for the rest of his contract with Selznick. He played the villain in Return of the Frontiersman (1950) and was hero of Monogram's County Fair (1950).

=== 1950–1954: 20th Century Fox and stardom ===
In August 1950, Calhoun signed a seven-year contract with 20th Century Fox. He had made no films for Selznick. "I didn't worry about it because it was like a long vacation with pay", he said later.

During Calhoun's contract with 20th Century Fox, he was in A Ticket to Tomahawk (1950) and was second male lead in I'd Climb the Highest Mountain (1951) with Susan Hayward and Meet Me After the Show (1951) with Betty Grable.

He went to Ventura to star in a Western, Rogue River (1951).

He was promoted to co-star for With a Song in My Heart (1952) with Hayward and Way of a Gaucho (1952) with Gene Tierney, directed by Jacques Tourneur.

Calhoun was promoted to star in the Westerns The Silver Whip (1953) with Dale Robertson and Robert Wagner and Powder River (1953) with Corinne Calvet. He was in How to Marry a Millionaire (1953) as Betty Grable's love interest, then was back to second male leads in River of No Return (1954) as Marilyn Monroe's boyfriend, who loses her to Robert Mitchum. Both films were big hits. Calhoun then left Fox.

=== 1954–1956: Freelancing and Universal Studios ===
Calhoun starred in a Western, The Yellow Tomahawk (1954). He went to Columbia for A Bullet Is Waiting (1954).

Calhoun went to Universal for which he made a Western, Four Guns to the Border (1954). He stayed there to star in the musical Ain't Misbehavin' (1955). Also in 1955, Calhoun and Julie Adams co-starred in the film The Looters. He then co-starred with Jeff Chandler in The Spoilers (1955). While filming The Spoilers, Calhoun's conviction history became public when his mugshot appeared on the May 1955 cover of Confidential magazine. When the news came out, he received an offer to play The Champion on Climax! and RKO asked him to be in The Treasure of Pancho Villa (1955). Ultimately, the disclosure had no negative effect on Calhoun's career and only served to solidify his "bad boy" image.

In 1956, he appeared on the TV show Zane Grey Theatre. At Universal, he was in Red Sundown (1956) and Raw Edge (1956). He wrote the story for the film Shotgun (1955) made by Allied Artists and tried to star in it, but Universal would not lend him. In late 1956, he arranged to pull out of his contract with Universal and said his fee was $75,000 per film.

=== 1957–1959: Producer and The Texan ===
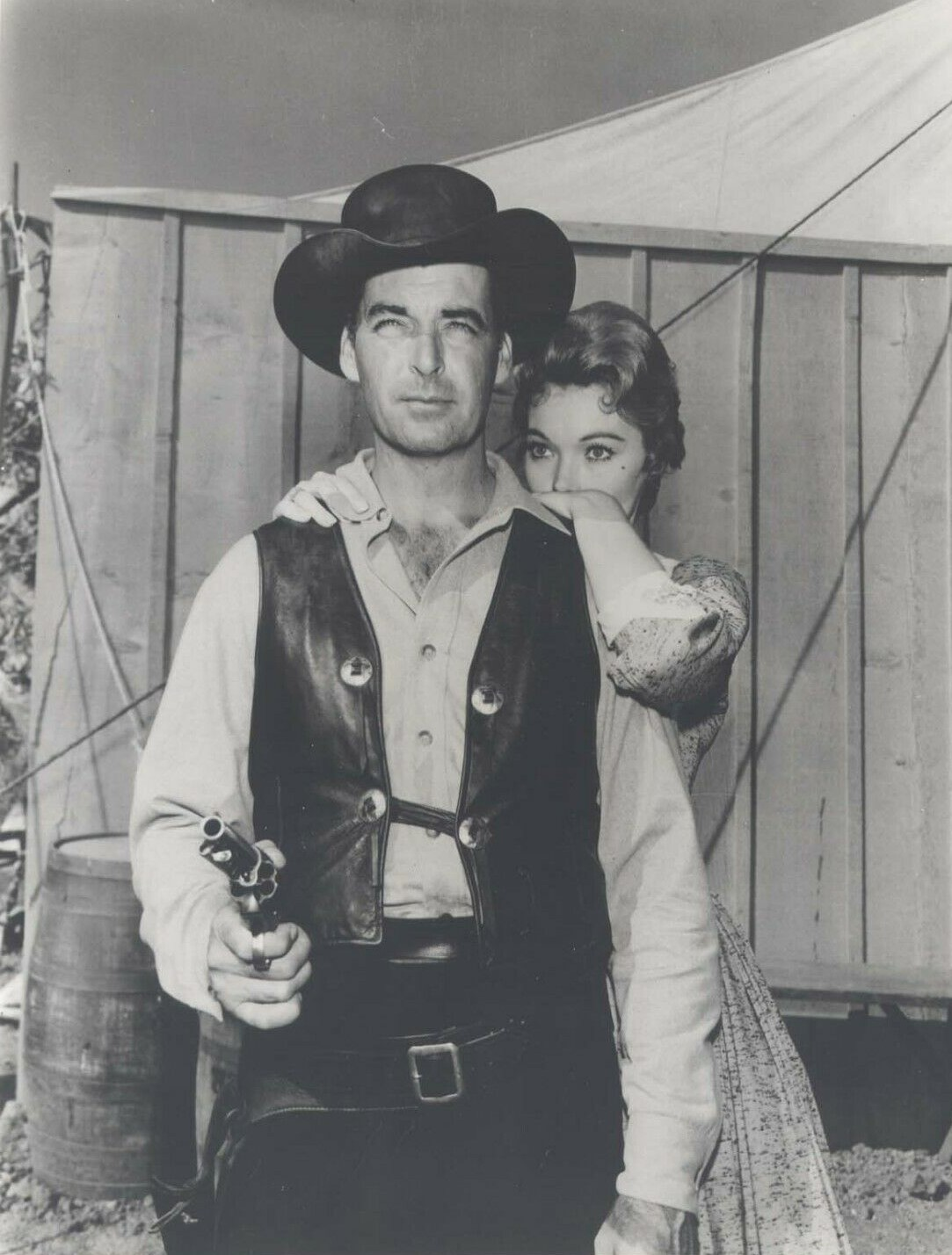
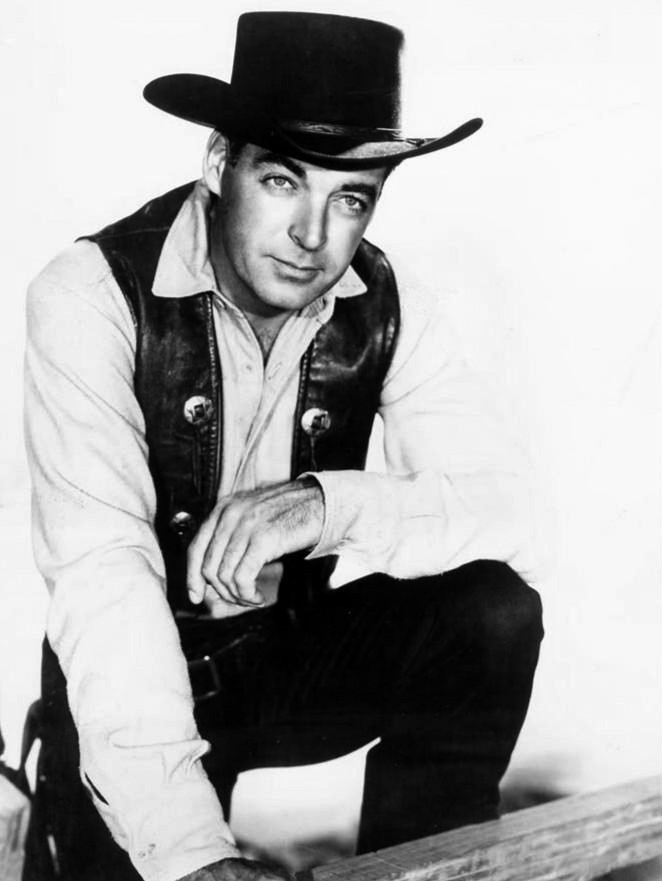
As Bill Longley in The Texan

In 1957, Calhoun formed Rorvic Productions, a production company, with his partner, Victor Orsatti.

He helped produce and starred in Flight to Hong Kong (1956), The Hired Gun (1957), Domino Kid (1957), and Apache Territory (1958).

He made Utah Blaine (1957) for Sam Katzman and The Big Caper (1957) for Pine-Thomas. For Kirk Douglas' company, he appeared in Ride Out for Revenge (1958), and he returned to Universal for The Saga of Hemp Brown (1958).

In 1958, on the recommendation of studio boss Desi Arnaz, Calhoun co-produced and starred in the television series The Texan, which aired on Monday evenings until 1960. He said in a 1959 article that the only two good films he made were With a Song in My Heart and How to Marry a Millionaire, with the rest being "terrible".

Calhoun produced and wrote screenplays throughout his career. The Texan could have filmed a third year, but Calhoun wanted to concentrate on films. On March 26, 1959, he appeared as himself in the episode "Rory Calhoun, The Texan" on the sitcom December Bride, starring Spring Byington.

=== 1960s ===
After The Texan ended, Calhoun starred in Thunder in Carolina (1960). He appeared on TV shows such as Gunsmoke, Death Valley Days, and Bonanza.

Calhoun went to Spain for The Colossus of Rhodes (1961) directed by Sergio Leone. (He was robbed during filming.) He did The Treasure of Monte Cristo (1961) in Britain, then did Marco Polo (1962) in Italy.

He returned to the U.S. to make several films for producer A.C. Lyles, such as The Young and The Brave (1963), Young Fury (1965), and Apache Uprising (1965), as well as other films such as Face in the Rain (1963).

Calhoun was considered for the lead of James West in the 1965–1969 CBS series The Wild Wild West, but the producers were not impressed with his screen test and instead chose Robert Conrad. He returned to Europe to make Our Men in Bagdad (1966) and The Emerald of Artatama (1969).

=== Later career ===
Calhoun continued to appear in both television and film throughout the 1970s and 1980s, including Thunder in Carolina, Rawhide, Gilligan's Island, Hawaii Five-O, Alias Smith and Jones and Starsky and Hutch. He also wrote the novels The Man From Padera (1979) and Cerrado (1980).

In 1982, Calhoun had a regular role on the soap opera Capitol, having been persuaded to accept the role by his family after his regret over turning down a part on CBS's Dallas. He stayed with the series until 1987.

Calhoun became known to a new generation for several roles in cult films such as Night of the Lepus (1972), Motel Hell (1980), Angel (1984), and its sequel Avenging Angel (1985), as well as Hell Comes to Frogtown (1987).

His final role was that of grizzled family patriarch and rancher Ernest Tucker in the film Pure Country (1992).

== Personal life ==
Calhoun was married three times: once to his first wife Lita Baron (1948–1970) and twice to his second wife Sue Rhodes (1971–1979 then again in 1982). He had three daughters with Baron. When Baron sued Calhoun for divorce, she named Betty Grable as one of 79 women with whom he had adulterous relationships. Calhoun replied to her charge: "Heck, she didn't even include half of them". He had one daughter with actress Vitina Marcus. He had one daughter with second wife journalist Sue Rhodes.

=== Political views ===
Calhoun supported Barry Goldwater in the 1964 United States presidential election.

=== Death ===
Calhoun died on April 28, 1999, at Providence Saint Joseph Medical Center in Burbank, California, of emphysema and diabetes. He was aged 76.

== Legacy ==
For his contributions to the film and television industries, Calhoun was inducted into the Hollywood Walk of Fame with two stars in 1960. His motion-picture star is located at 7007 Hollywood Boulevard, and his television star is at 1752 Vine Street.

In The Simpsons episode "Two Dozen and One Greyhounds", Calhoun is mentioned in an apparent non sequitur when greyhound puppies are said by Mr. Burns to resemble Calhoun as someone who would stand up and walk, so Burns cannot harm them. Speaking of the inclusion, writer Josh Weinstein advised this was because writers believed "Rory Calhoun" to be a "perfect name for a '50s heartthrob". Rifftrax made a reference to this Simpsons reference in their commentary to Night of the Lepus, which starred Calhoun.

== Filmography ==
- Something for the Boys (1944) as Soldier (uncredited)
- Sunday Dinner for a Soldier (1944) as Soldier in Truck (uncredited)
- The Bullfighters (1945, billed as Frank McCown) as El Brillante – Disgusted Matador (uncredited)
- Where Do We Go From Here? (1945) as Soldier Leaving Canteen (uncredited)
- The Great John L. (1945) as James J. "Gentleman Jim" Corbett
- Nob Hill (1945) as Jose – Boxer Sparring with Tony (uncredited)
- The Red House (1947) as Teller
- Adventure Island (1947) as Mr. Herrick
- That Hagen Girl (1947) as Ken Freneau
- Miraculous Journey (1948) as Larry Burke
- Massacre River (1949) as Phil Acton
- Sand (1949) as Chick Palmer
- A Ticket to Tomahawk (1950) as Dakota
- Return of the Frontiersman (1950) as Larrabee
- County Fair (1950) as Peter Brennan
- Rogue River (1951) as Ownie Rogers
- I'd Climb the Highest Mountain (1951) as Jack Stark
- Meet Me After the Show (1951) as David Hemingway
- With a Song in My Heart (1952) as John Burn
- Way of a Gaucho (1952) as Martin Penalosa
- The Silver Whip (1953) as Sheriff Tom Davisson
- Powder River (1953) as Chino Bullock
- How to Marry a Millionaire (1953) as Eben
- River of No Return (1954) as Harry Weston
- The Yellow Tomahawk (1954) as Adam Reed
- Dawn at Socorro (1954) as Brett Wade
- A Bullet Is Waiting (1954) as Ed Stone
- Four Guns to the Border (1954) as Cully
- Ain't Misbehavin' (1955) as Jesse Hill
- The Looters (1955) as Kenneth Post
- The Treasure of Pancho Villa (1955) as Tom Bryan
- The Spoilers (1955) as Alex McNamara
- Red Sundown (1956) as Alec Longmire
- Raw Edge (1956) as Tex Kirby
- Flight to Hong Kong (1956) as Tony Dumont
- Utah Blaine (1957) as Utah Blaine
- The Big Caper (1957) as Frank Harper
- The Hired Gun (1957) as Gil McCord
- Domino Kid (1957) as Domino
- Ride Out for Revenge (1957) as Tate
- The Saga of Hemp Brown (1958) as Hemp Brown
- Apache Territory (1958) as Logan Cates
- Thunder in Carolina (1960) as Mitch Cooper
- The Colossus of Rhodes (1961) as Dario
- The Treasure of Monte Cristo (1961) as Captain Adam Corbett
- Marco Polo (1962) as Marco Polo
- The Young and The Brave (1963) as MSgt. Ed Brent (escaped POW)
- The Gun Hawk (1963) as Blaine Madden
- A Face in the Rain (1963) as Rand
- Young Fury (1964) as Clint McCoy
- Finger on the Trigger (1965) as Larry Winton
- Black Spurs (1965) as Santee
- Apache Uprising (1966) as Jim Walker
- Our Men in Bagdad (1966) as Alex
- Operation Delilah (1967) as Rory
- Operation Cross Eagles (1968) as Sgt. Sean McAfee
- The Emerald of Artatama (1969) as Jack Cooper
- Las Virgenes de la nueva ola (1969)
- Night of the Lepus (1972) as Cole Hillman
- Won Ton Ton, the Dog Who Saved Hollywood (1976) as Philip Hart
- Mission to Glory: A True Story (1977) as Capt. Juan Monje
- Love and the Midnight Auto Supply (1977) as Len Thompson
- Mule Feathers (1977) as Bonaparte Shelby
- Flatbed Annie and Sweetie Pie: Lady Truckers (1979) as Farmer
- Revenge of Bigfoot (1979) as Bob Spence
- The Rebels (1979) as Breen
- Bitter Heritage (1979) as Manuel
- Runnin' Hot (1980)
- Motel Hell (1980) as Vincent Smith
- Smokey and the Judge (1980) as Matt Polsky
- Angel (1984) as Kit Carson
- Avenging Angel (1985) as Kit Carson
- Hell Comes to Frogtown (1988) as Looney Tunes
- Roller Blade Warriors: Taken by Force (1989) as Old Turkel
- Bad Jim (1990) as Sam Harper
- Pure Country (1992) as Ernest Tucker

== Television ==
- Wagon Train (2 episodes), (1961) as Artie Matthewson, (1965 S8 E26) as Jarbo Pierce
- Death Valley Days (2 episodes, 1963, as the Arizona Ranger Burt Mossman, who captures the notorious outlaw Augustine Chacon, played by Michael Pate; 1966, as William A. Richardson a pioneer entrepreneur of the future San Francisco, California) as William Richardson / Capt. Burt Mossman
- The Texan (78 episodes, 1958–1960) as Bill Longley
- Bonanza (Episode: "Thanks for Everything, Friend", 1964) as Tom Wilson
- The Virginian (Episode: "A Father for Toby", 1964) as Jim Shea / Jim Hansen
- Gunsmoke (1 episode, 1965) as Ben Stack
- Rawhide (1 episode, 1965) as Joseph Denner
- I Spy (1 episode, 1966) as Dimitri
- Gilligan's Island (1 episode, 1967) as Jonathan Kincaid
- Custer (1 episode, 1967) as Zebediah Jackson
- Lancer (1 episode, 1970) as Buck Addison
- The Doris Day Show (1 episode, 1972) as Matt Lawrence
- Owen Marshall: Counselor at Law (1 episode, 1972) as Bwana Bill
- Hec Ramsey (1 episode, 1973) as Jim Patton
- Circle of Fear (1973, TV series )1 episode, DEATH'S HEAD as Larry
- Police Story (1 episode, 1973) as Pete Eastman
- Petrocelli (1 episode, 1974) as Edgar Richardson
- Police Woman (1 episode, 1974) as Lou Gerard
- Movin' On (1 episode, 1975) as J.C. Coombs
- Starsky & Hutch (1 episode, 1977) as Steve Hanson
- Little Vic (1977, mini-series) as Lead
- Fantasy Island (1 episode, 1978) as Mr. Watson
- The Misadventures of Sheriff Lobo (1 episode, 1981) as Mr. Hobbes
- Hart to Hart (1 episode, 1982) as Jim Bailey
- The Blue and the Gray (miniseries, 1982) as Gen. George Meade
- Capitol (1982-1987) Judge Judson Tyler
- Family Feud (2 episodes, 1985) as Himself
- Alfred Hitchcock Presents (1 episode, 1988) as Jimmie Thurson
- Tales from the Crypt (1 episode, 1993) as Spider (final appearance)

== Producer ==
- The Hired Gun (1957)
- Domino Kid (1957)
- Apache Territory (1958)
- The Texan
- Fists of Steel (1991)

== Writer ==
- Shotgun (1955)
- Domino Kid (1957)
