= Mara Cruz =

Spanish film actress

- Born: María Isabel Palomo González; March 24, 1941 (age 85); Madrid, Spain
- Occupation: Actress
- Years active: 1957–1976

Mara Cruz (Madrid, Spain; March 24, 1941) is a Spanish film actress.

== Selected filmography ==
- The Warrior and the Slave Girl (1958)
- The Italians They Are Crazy (1958)
- The University Chorus (1960)
- Left Handed Johnny West (1965)
- Tall Women (1966)
- Los siete de Pancho Villa (1967)
- Dos cruces en Danger Pass (1967)

== Bibliography ==
- Weisser, Thomas (August 22, 2005). Spaghetti Westerns: the Good, the Bad and the Violent: A Comprehensive, Illustrated Filmography of 558 Eurowesterns and Their Personnel, 1961-1977. McFarland & Company. p. 498. ISBN 9780786424429.
