= Judy Geeson =

English actress (born 1948)

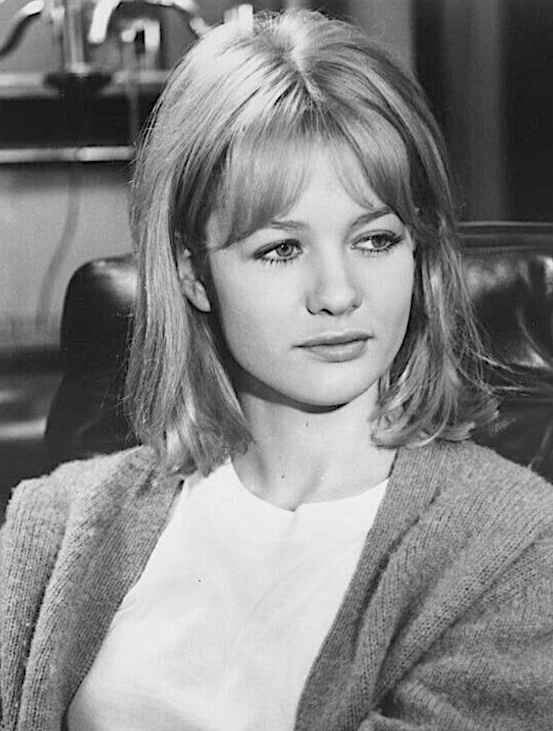
- Geeson in 1971
- Born: 10 September 1948 (age 78); Arundel, Sussex, England
- Education: Corona Stage Academy
- Occupation: Actress
- Years active: 1962–present
- Spouse: Kristoffer Tabori (m. 1984; div. 1989)
- Partner: Sean Kenny (1969–1973)
- Relatives: Sally Geeson (sister)

Judith Amanda Geeson (/dʒiːsʌn/ JEE-son; born 10 September 1948) is an English film, stage, and television actress. She began her career primarily working on British television series, with a leading role on The Newcomers from 1965 to 1967, before making her major film debut in To Sir, with Love (1967). She starred in a range of films throughout the 1970s, from crime pictures to thriller and horror films, including The Executioner (1970), 10 Rillington Place (1970), Fear in the Night (1972), Brannigan (1975), and The Eagle Has Landed (1976). She played heiress Caroline Penvenen from 1975-1977 in the BBC series Poldark.

Geeson appeared in several stage productions in the 1980s, including two for the Royal Shakespeare Company, as well as an Off-Broadway production of The Common Pursuit (1986). After relocating to the United States she returned to television, playing the recurring character of Maggie Conway in the American series Mad About You from 1992 until 1999, as well as a recurring role on Gilmore Girls in 2002. In 2012 and 2016, she appeared in Rob Zombie's The Lords of Salem and 31, respectively.

== Early life ==
Judy Geeson was born in Arundel, Sussex on 10 September 1948. Her father was an editor for the National Coal Board magazine. Her sister Sally Geeson, also an actress, is known for her roles in British television sitcoms of the 1970s. Geeson attended Corona Stage Academy and made her stage debut in 1957.

== Career ==
Geeson's professional acting career started in July 1962, with an appearance in an episode of the television series The Probation Officer. Her first major film appearances came in 1967, with roles in To Sir, with Love and Berserk!. She followed these films with the comedy Here We Go Round the Mulberry Bush (1968). Geeson became well known as a result of a regular role in the BBC early-evening soap opera The Newcomers. She also had a major role in the mid-1970s costume drama Poldark as Caroline Penvenen (later Caroline Enys).

Geeson's other films include Prudence and the Pill (1968), Three into Two Won't Go (1969), 10 Rillington Place (1970), Doomwatch (1972), Brannigan (1975), starring John Wayne, and The Eagle Has Landed (1976). In the TV series Danger UXB (1979) she played the female lead, Susan Mount, opposite Anthony Andrews. She also had the lead role of Fulvia in the science fiction series Star Maidens (1976).

In addition to her film and television work during this time, Geeson also performed in theatrical productions for the Royal Shakespeare Company as Lavinia in Titus Andronicus and as Viven 532 in Section Nine (both 1973). She also had roles in stage productions of Next Time I'll Sing to You (1980) and The Real Thing (1985), both in London, before making her Off-Broadway debut in The Common Pursuit in 1987.

Geeson relocated from London to Los Angeles in 1984; there she began appearing in American television, including a role as a series regular in the sitcom Mad About You, playing the hostile neighbour, Maggie Conway, from 1992 to 1999. She also played the role of Sandrine in the Star Trek: Voyager episodes "The Cloud" and "Twisted".

Having appeared in a number of horror films during the 1970s and 1980s, including Fear in the Night (1972), A Candle for the Devil (1973), Dominique (1978) and Inseminoid (1981), Geeson returned to the horror genre in The Lords of Salem (2012), directed by Rob Zombie. The film marked her return to acting following a nine-year absence. She portrayed Sister Dragon in Rob Zombie's slasher film 31 which was released in 2015.

== Personal life ==
In the 1970s, Geeson lived with set designer Sean Kenny until his death in 1973. She was married to actor Kristoffer Tabori from 1985 until their divorce in 1989. In a 2015 interview, Geeson stated that she had resided in Los Angeles, California, for the past 30 years.

== Filmography ==
=== Film ===
Year	Title	Role	Notes
1963	Wings of Mystery	Jane	
1967	To Sir, With Love	Pamela Dare	
1967	Berserk!	Angela Rivers	
1968	Here We Go Round the Mulberry Bush	Mary Gloucester	
1968	Prudence and the Pill	Geraldine Hardcastle	
1968	Hammerhead	Sue Trenton	
1969	Three into Two Won't Go	Ella Patterson	
1969	Two Gentlemen Sharing	Jane	
1970	The Executioner	Polly Bendel	
1970	Goodbye Gemini	Jacki	
1971	10 Rillington Place	Beryl Evans (Note: 10 Rillington Place has been cited as one of Geeson's favourite films. She owns a first edition of the journalistic investigation by Ludovic Kennedy, on which the film is based; see 10 Days In LA: Interview With Judy Geeson (2005) Archived 9 June 2011 at the Wayback Machine, Tvo.org.)	
1971	Who Killed the Mysterious Mr. Foster?	Jody Kenyon	Television film
1971	One of Those Things	Susanne Strauss	
1972	Doomwatch	Victoria Brown	
1972	Fear in the Night	Peggy Heller	
1973	A Candle for the Devil	Laura Barkley	
1974	Percy's Progress	Doctor Fairweather	
1975	Brannigan	Detective Sergeant Jennifer Thatcher	
1975	Diagnosis Murder	Helen	
1976	Adventures of a Taxi Driver	Nikki	
1976	Short Ends	Claudine	Short film
1976	Carry On England	Sergeant Tilly Willing	
1976	The Eagle Has Landed	Pamela Verecker	
1978	Dominique	Marjorie Craven	
1980	Towards the Morning		Short film
1981	Inseminoid	Sandy	
1982	The Plague Dogs	Pekingese	Voice role
1987	The Price of Life	Anthea	Short film
1988	The Secret Life of Kathy McCormick	Babs	Television film
1993	Young Goodman Brown	Bridget Bishop	
1996	To Sir, with Love II	Pamela Dare	Television film
1998	Houdini	Lady Doyle	Television film
1999	The Duke	Lady Fautblossom	
2000	Alien Fury: Countdown to Invasion	Alien	Television film; voice role
2000	Everything Put Together	Angie's Mother	
2003	Spanish Fly	Miss England	
2012	The Lords of Salem	Lacy Doyle	
2015	Grandma	Francesca	
2016	31	Sister Dragon	
2019	The Wrong Husband	Madame Briggs	
2021	Let Us In	Nana Edie	
2021	Last Call in the Dog House	Lilly	
2022	Waking Up Dead	Lila	
2023	Finding Hannah	Hannah	

=== Television ===
Year	Title	Role	Notes
1961–64	Dixon of Dock Green	Jenny Fenton / Dawn Pearce	2 episodes
1962	Probation Officer	Gwen Thomas	1 episode
1962	Emergency Ward 10	Joanne Phipps	3 episodes
1964	Malatesta	Vanella	1 episode
1964	Television Club	Shirley Brent	18 episodes
1965	Alexander Graham Bell	Berta Hubbard	3 episodes
1965	The Flying Swan	Sonia Dale	1 episode
1965	Cluff	Joan Cluff	1 episode
1965	Blackmail	Sarah	1 episode
1965	Danger Man	Helen Cazalet	1 episode
1965–67	The Newcomers	Maria Cooper	51 episodes
1966	Mrs Thursday	Brenda Scott	1 episode
1967	Mickey Dunne	Sasha Newman	1 episode
1967	Mr. Rose	Shirley	1 episode
1967	Man in a Suitcase	Sue Mandel	1 episode
1972	Lady Windermere's Fan (Play of the Month)	Lady Windermere	BBC taped drama
1973	A Room with a View (Play of the Month)	Lucy Honeychurch	BBC taped drama
1973	The Rivals of Sherlock Holmes, "The Mysterious Death on the Underground Railway"	Polly Burton	Thames Television taped drama
1974	The Skin Game (Play of the Month)	Chloe	BBC taped drama
1975	Space: 1999	Regina Kesslann	1 episode
1975–77	Poldark	Caroline Enys (née Penvenen)	19 episodes
1975	Thriller	Helen Marlow	Episode: "Night is the Time for Killing"
1976	Star Maidens	Fulvia	8 episodes
1977	Seven Faces of Woman	Carol	1 episode
1978	Return of the Saint	Selma Morrell	1 episode
1978	The Newcomers	Maria Cooper	2 episodes
1979	Danger UXB	Susan Mount	9 episodes
1980	Breakaway	Becky Royce	6 episodes
1980–83	Tales of the Unexpected	Mary / Sandra	2 episodes
1985–86	Murder, She Wrote	Sister Ruth Fargo / Elaine McComber	2 episodes
1986	The A-Team	Marlena Strasser	1 episode
1986	Hotel	Pat Magnuson	1 episode
1988	MacGyver	Liane Auber	1 episode
1990	Monsters	Anna	Episode: "Refugee"
1992–99	Mad About You	Maggie Conway	33 episodes
1995	Star Trek: Voyager	Sandrine	2 episodes
1996–99	Tracey Takes On...	Elsie Ayliss / Dorothy Appleton / Guest	3 episodes
1998	NewsRadio	Auctioneer	1 episode
2000	Touched by an Angel	Pookie Longfellow-Smith	1 episode
2000	Charmed	Ruth Cobb	1 episode
2000	Love & Money	Emma	1 episode
2001–02	Gilmore Girls	Natalie Swope	3 episodes

== Stage credits ==
Year	Title	Role	Venue	Ref.
1972	Othello	Desdemona	The Space, London	
1973	Titus Andronicus	Lavinia	Aldwych Theatre, London	
1973	Section Nine	Viven 532	The Place, Stratford-upon-Avon	
1980	Next Time I'll Sing to You	Lizzie	Greenwich Theatre, London	
1985	The Real Thing		Novello Theatre, London	
1986	The Common Pursuit	Marigold Watson	Promenade Theatre, New York City	
1987	Aunt Dan and Lemon	Lemon's mother	Mark Taper Forum, Los Angeles	
1987	Henceforward...	Zoe	Alley Theatre, Houston	
2002	Under the Blue Sky	Anne	Geffen Playhouse, Los Angeles	

== Sources ==
- Cotter, Robert Michael (2013). The Women of Hammer Horror: A Biographical Dictionary and Filmography. Jefferson, North Carolina: McFarland. ISBN 978-1-476-60201-1.
- Gifford, Dennis (1978). The Illustrated Who's Who in British Films. London, England: Batsford. ISBN 978-0-713-41434-9.
- Maxford, Howard (2019). Hammer Complete: The Films, the Personnel, the Company. Jefferson, North Carolina: McFarland. ISBN 978-1-476-62914-8.
