= Operation Delilah =

Operation Delilah is a 1967 Spanish comedy film starring Rory Calhoun.
