= José María Elorrieta =

Spanish film director and screenwriter

- Born: 1 February 1921; Madrid, Spain
- Died: 22 February 1974 (aged 53); Madrid, Spain
- Other name: José María Elorrieta de Lacy
- Occupations: Writer, Director
- Years active: 1945-1974 (film)

José María Elorrieta (1921–1974) was a Spanish screenwriter and film director. He wrote or directed a number of Spaghetti Westerns.

== Selected filmography ==
=== Director ===
- María Dolores (1953)
- Flame Over Vietnam (1957)
- The Fan (1958)
- The Showgirl (1960)
- Today's Melodies (1960)
- The University Chorus (1960)
- You Have the Eyes of a Deadly Woman (1962)
- Apache Fury (1964)
- Fuerte perdido (1965)
- The Treasure of Makuba (1967) - as Joe Lacy
- A Witch Without a Broom (1967) - as Joe Lacy
- The Vengeance of Pancho Villa (1967)
- The Emerald of Artatama (1969)

=== Screenwriter ===
- Devil's Roundup (1952)
- Curra Veleta (1956)

== Bibliography ==
- Thomas Weisser. Spaghetti Westerns--the Good, the Bad and the Violent: A Comprehensive, Illustrated Filmography of 558 Eurowesterns and Their Personnel, 1961-1977. McFarland, 2005.
