= Orsatti =

Orsatti is a surname. Notable people with the surname include:

- Andrew Orsatti (born 1975), Communications Director and Spokesman for football's international players' union FIFPro
- Ernie Orsatti (1902–1968), American baseball player
- Ken Orsatti (1932–2010), American film director
- Victor Orsatti (1905–1984), American talent agent and film producer
