= Ken Orsatti =

American director (1932–2010)

Ken Orsatti (January 31, 1932 – August 31, 2010) was an American director. Orsatti was the national executive director of the Screen Actors Guild from 1981 to 2000.

Orsatti was born Alfred Kendall Orsatti in Los Angeles in 1932. His father and two uncles were talent agents, who owned and operated a leading talent agency, the Orsatti Agency. He received a bachelor's degree in business administration from the University of Southern California in 1956. Following graduation, Orsatti became a production assistant at Rorvic Productions, which was owned by his uncle, Victor Orsatti, and the actor Rory Calhoun.

Orsatti became a business representative at the American Federation of Television and Radio Artists (AFTRA) in 1960. He left AFTRA in 1961 and joined the Screen Actors Guild (SAG). He became the SAG's Western regional director in 1966. He was promoted to SAG's Hollywood executive secretary in 1971, a position he held until 1981.

Orsatti, became the executive director of the Screen Actors Guild in 1981. He negotiated and brokered more than 20 union contracts as SAG's chief negotiator during his nineteen-year tenure.

In 1994, Orsatti told the Los Angeles Business Journal, "Someone once said that the perfect negotiation is one where both sides are unhappy. There's some truth to that." He retired from the Screen Actors Guild in 2000.

== Death ==
Orsatti died on August 31, 2010, of pulmonary disease at West Hills Hospital in West Hills, Los Angeles, aged 78.
