= Domino Kid =

1957 film by Ray Nazarro

- Theatrical release poster
- Directed by: Ray Nazarro
- Screenplay by: Kenneth Gamet; Hal Biller
- Produced by: Rory Calhoun; Victor Orsatti
- Starring: Rory Calhoun; Kristine Miller; Andrew Duggan; Yvette Dugay; Peter Whitney; Eugene Iglesias
- Cinematography: Irving Lippman
- Edited by: Gene Havlick
- Production companies: Calhoun-Orsatti Enterprises; Rorvic Productions
- Distributed by: Columbia Pictures
- Release date: October 1957
- Running time: 74 minutes
- Country: United States
- Language: English

Domino Kid is a 1957 American Western film directed by Ray Nazarro and written by Kenneth Gamet and Hal Biller. The film stars Rory Calhoun, Kristine Miller, Andrew Duggan, Yvette Dugay, Peter Whitney and Eugene Iglesias. The film was released in October 1957, by Columbia Pictures.

== Plot ==
Domino (Rory Calhoun) returns from the Civil War to find his ranch in ruins and his father murdered. Five men were responsible and four were identified. One by one Domino outdraws the four that were known, all being outlaws. There is only one left now. Domino does not know his identity but that man probably knows of Domino and his mission.

== Cast ==
- Rory Calhoun as Cort Garand aka Domino Kid
- Kristine Miller as Barbara Ellison
- Andrew Duggan as Wade Harrington, Land Office Manager
- Yvette Dugay as Rosita, owner, dancer at The Cantina La Rosita
- Peter Whitney as Lafe Prentiss, outlaw gunman, fifth and last victim of Domino Kid
- Eugene Iglesias as Juan Cortez, guitarist at The Cantina La Rosita
- Robert Burton as Sheriff Travers
- Tom London as Davis - Rancher (uncredited)
- Roy Barcroft as Ed Sandlin, saloon owner, victim of Domino Kid (uncredited)
- James Griffith as Sam Beal, gunman, victim of Domino Kid (uncredited)
- Denver Pyle as Bill Dreger (uncredited)
- Duane Grey as Bob Trancas, gunman, victim of Domino Kid (uncredited)
- Fred Graham as Domino Kid's 1st victim, Haimes in the opening scene (uncredited)
