= Kipp Hamilton =

American actress (1934–1981)

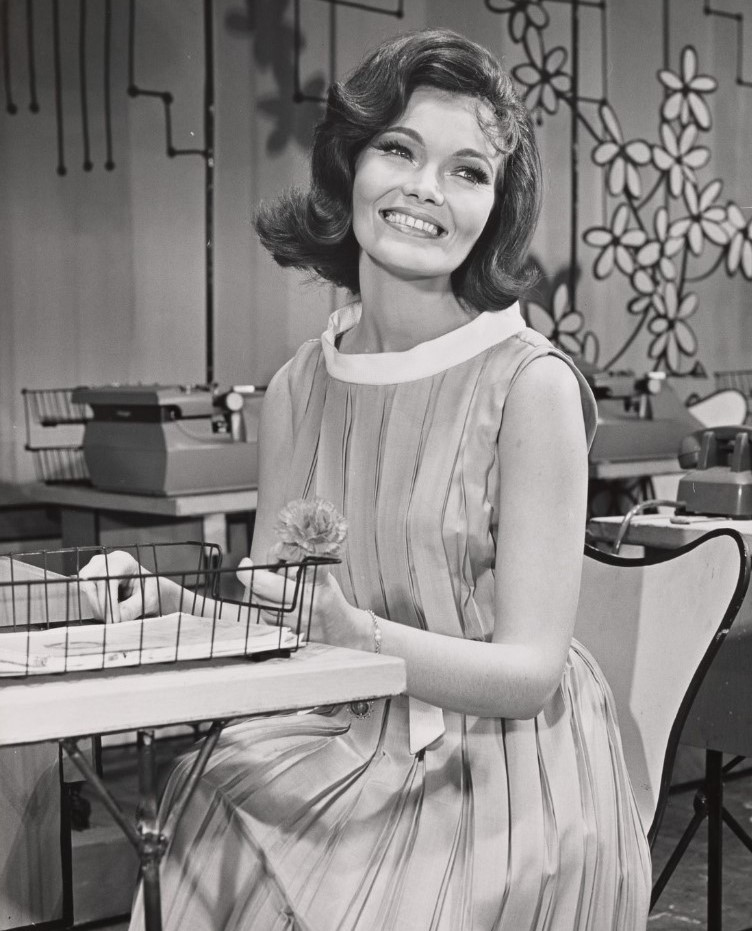
- Hamilton in the musical How to Succeed in Business Without Really Trying (1964)
- Born: Rita Marie Hamilton; August 16, 1934; Los Angeles, California, U.S.
- Died: January 29, 1981 (aged 46); Los Angeles, California, U.S.
- Resting place: Holy Cross Cemetery, Culver City
- Other name: Rita Rosenfeld
- Occupation: Actress
- Years active: 1953–1967
- Spouses: David Geisel (m. 1963; div. 1965) Donald Thorman Rosenfeld (m. 1968)
- Children: 2
- Relatives: Joe Hamilton (brother); Carrie Hamilton (niece); Erin Hamilton (niece)

Rita Marie "Kipp" Hamilton (August 16, 1934 – January 29, 1981) was an American actress. She was the younger sister of producer Joe Hamilton and the sister-in-law of Carol Burnett.

== Early life and family ==
She was born Rita Marie Hamilton on August 16, 1934, in Los Angeles, California, the youngest of six children of Joseph and Marie Hamilton. Her brother Joe Hamilton was an actor and producer who later married actress, comedian and producer Carol Burnett.

== Career ==
Hamilton made her film debut in a supporting role in the RKO Radio Pictures drama On Our Very Own (1950). In March 1953, she was named "Miss Optometry" by the New York State Association of Optometrists. In mid-1955, Hamilton signed a seven-year contract with 20th Century Fox. Shortly after signing with Fox, Hamilton (along with nine other up-and-coming actresses, including Anita Ekberg and Lori Nelson) was named a "Deb Star of 1955". That same year, Hamilton was cast in her first major role in the drama Good Morning, Miss Dove, playing Jincey Baker.

The following year, Hamilton asked to be released from her contract with Fox. Throughout the remainder of the 1950s, Hamilton appeared in guest roles on Perry Mason, Meet McGraw, Richard Diamond, Private Detective, The Life and Legend of Wyatt Earp, The Texan, and 77 Sunset Strip. In 1959, Hamilton appeared in a supporting role in Never So Few. Later that same year, she signed with Hecht Hill Lancaster (the production company partially owned by actor Burt Lancaster) and was cast in the Western The Unforgiven (1960). She also had a nightclub act that she performed at Lou Black's Living Room, a club in Montreal, Quebec, Canada. This followed with a starring role in Finian's Rainbow at the Cocoanut Grove.

In November 1963, Hamilton began touring in the road production of the musical How to Succeed in Business Without Really Trying. She remained with the production until mid-1964. In 1965, she returned to television with the guest-starring role on the Bewitched episode "Pleasure O'Reilly" as the title character. The following year, Henry G. Saperstein cast Hamilton in what was her final film role, a singer in The War of the Gargantuas, a Japanese kaiju movie. Billed as a "special guest star", Hamilton performs the song "The Words Get Stuck in My Throat", which later was covered by Devo. Hamilton's final onscreen role was in a 1967 episode of The Virginian.

== Personal life ==
In 1958, Hamilton dated and later became engaged to film mogul Adolph Zukor's grandson Adolph Zukor II, a worker in the publicity and foreign departments at Paramount Pictures. Hamilton called off the engagement in March 1959 while she was filming The Unforgiven in Durango, Mexico.

In February 1962, Hamilton married director Dave Geisel, whom she had met on the set of The Garry Moore Show, which her brother Joe produced. They had a daughter, Marie, in 1963 and separated the following year. They were divorced in June 1965. Geisel died in 1969.

== Later years and death ==
After retiring from acting, Hamilton married Beverly Hills lawyer Donald Thorman Rosenfeld in February 1968. They had a daughter, Dana, in October 1968. She continued to act in regional theater until her death from breast cancer on January 29, 1981, aged 46. She is buried in Holy Cross Cemetery in Culver City, California. In July 2022, Kipp was profiled in Classic Images, in which her daughters and co-stars discussed her onscreen career.

== Filmography ==
Film
Year	Title	Role	Notes
1950	Our Very Own	Gwendolyn	Credited as Rita Hamilton
1955	Good Morning, Miss Dove	Virginia "Jincey" Baker	
1956	Bigger Than Life	Pat Wade	
1959	Never So Few	Margaret Fitch	Alternative title: Campaign Burma
1960	The Unforgiven	Georgia Rawlins	
1965	Harlow	Marie Tanner	
1966	The War of the Gargantuas	Singer	

Television
Year	Title	Role	Notes
1955–1957	The 20th Century Fox Hour	Susie Hagget; Christina Bradley	Episodes: "Christopher Bean" "The Marriage Broker"
1958	Perry Mason	Elaine Barton	Episode: "The Case of the Cautious Coquette"
1958	Mickey Spillane's Mike Hammer	Katie O'Donnell	Episode: "Dead Men Don't Dream"
1958	Meet McGraw	Helen Maddon	Episode: "The Setup"
1958	Richard Diamond, Private Detective	Yvette Greener	Episode: "One Foot in the Grave"
1959	The Lineup		Episode: "The Murdered Blonde Case"
1959	77 Sunset Strip	Lili	Episode: "Vacation with Pay"
1959	The Life and Legend of Wyatt Earp	Miss Doreen	Episode: "Dodge Is Civilized"
1959–1960	The Texan	Steve	5 episodes
1960	Rawhide	Shezoe	Episode: "Incident of the Dancing Death"
1961	Westinghouse Playhouse	Sylvia Morrow	Episode: "I Seen the Saw"
1965	Bewitched	Priscilla "Pleasure" O'Reilly	Episode: "Pleasure O'Reilly"
1965	The Man from U.N.C.L.E.	Lavinia Brown	Episode: "The Girls of Nazarone Affair"
1965	Burke's Law	Silkie	Episode: "Steam Heat"
1965	The Wild Wild West	Cluny Ormont	Episode: "The Night of the Glowing Corpse"
1965	The Smothers Brothers Show	Danielle	Episode: "Boys Will Be Playboys"
1966	My Three Sons	Maxine	Episode: "Call Her Max"
1967	Family Affair	Meg	Episode: "Fancy Free"
1967	The Pruitts of Southampton	Greta	Episode: "Goddess of Love"
1967	Dragnet	Jana Altman	Episode: "The Bank Jobs"
1967	The Virginian	Gloria	Episode: "The Fortress", (final appearance)
