= List of 77 Sunset Strip episodes =

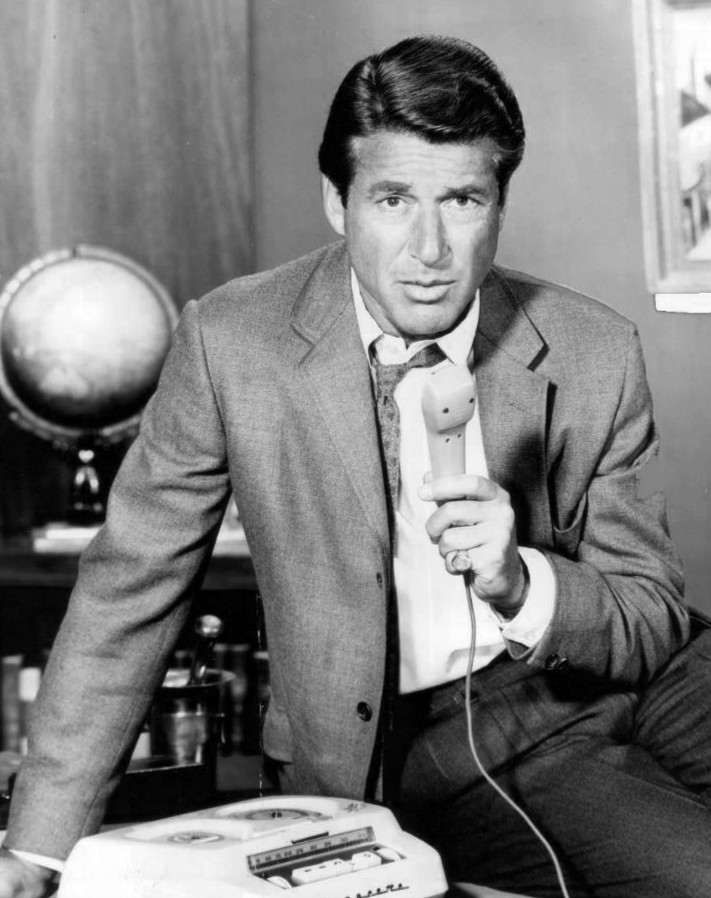
Efrem Zimbalist Jr. as Stuart Bailey

77 Sunset Strip is a 1958-1964 American television private detective drama series created by Roy Huggins and starring Efrem Zimbalist Jr., Roger Smith, Richard Long (from 1960 to 1961) and Edd Byrnes (billed as Edward Byrnes). The character of detective Stuart Bailey, portrayed in the series by Zimbalist, was first used by writer Huggins in his 1946 novel The Double Take, later adapted into the 1948 film I Love Trouble which was also written by Huggins.

== Series overview ==
Season	Episodes	Premiered:	Ended:
1	34	October 10, 1958	May 29, 1959
2	36	October 2, 1959	June 10, 1960
3	39	September 16, 1960	June 30, 1961
4	41	September 22, 1961	June 29, 1962
5	36	October 12, 1962	June 14, 1963
6	20	September 20, 1963	February 7, 1964

== Episodes ==
=== Season 1: 1958–59 ===
No. overall	No. in season	Title	Directed by	Written by	Original release date
1	1	"Girl on the Run"	Richard L. Bare	Story by : Roy Huggins; Screenplay by : Marion Hargrove	October 10, 1958
Pilot (initially briefly shown as a "feature film" in one Caribbean theatre in order for the studio to cheat Roy Huggins of television series creator rights, according to Huggins' Archive of American Television interview) and premiere episode of the series. Stuart is hired to find a singer who witnessed a murder. Of the show's eventual regular characters, only Stuart (Efrem Zimbalist, Jr.) and Suzanne (Jacqueline Beer) are seen. Edd Byrnes plays a contract killer in this episode, but beginning in the very next episode he became a series regular in the role of Gerald Lloyd "Kookie" Kookson III, parking valet at Dino's Club, the nightclub next door to the agency.
2	2	"Lovely Lady, Pity Me"	Douglas Heyes	Teleplay by : James O'Hanlon and Douglas Heyes; Based on the novel by : Roy Huggins	October 17, 1958
Stuart becomes enamored of a mysterious potential client (Kathleen Crowley), who refuses to divulge her name or why she wants to hire a private detective. Debut of Roger Smith as Jeff Spencer, Stuart's partner. Jeff is said to be in San Francisco at the beginning of the episode, and plays only a minor role here.
3	3	"A Nice Social Evening"	Stuart Heisler	Story by : Howie Horwitz; Teleplay by : Frederic Brady	October 24, 1958
Stuart is hired to keep his eye out for trouble when a wealthy Latin American playboy (Ray Danton) is warned that he is in danger of being killed.
4	4	"Casualty"	Richard L. Bare	Story by : Aubrey Wisberg and Jack Pollexfen; Teleplay by : Gene Levitt; From a screenplay by : Winston Miller	October 31, 1958
Jeff is hired by a widow who insists she has recently seen her husband, although he died several years ago. With Dolores Donlon, Sam Buffington and Nancy Kulp. Louis Quinn debuts as Roscoe.
5	5	"The Bouncing Chip"	Leslie H. Martinson	Leonard Lee	November 7, 1958
A Las Vegas casino hires Stuart to find out who is manufacturing counterfeit chips, causing tens of thousands of dollars in losses. With Ruta Lee.
6	6	"Two and Two Make Six"	James V. Kern	Frank Gruber	November 14, 1958
A man (Adam West) who Jeff had once sent to prison seems to be targeted for death, so his wife hires Jeff to track down the would-be murderer.
7	7	"All Our Yesterdays"	Richard L. Bare	Frederic Brady	November 21, 1958
Stuart is approached by a former silent film star (Doris Kenyon) who wants him to track down her old film co-stars and crew. With Francis X. Bushman and John Carradine.
8	8	"The Well-Selected Frame"	Boris Sagal	Story by : Gerald Drayson Adams; Teleplay by : Charles Hoffman	November 28, 1958
Jeff is hired by a woman who believes her husband is trying to kill her.
9	9	"Iron Curtain Caper"	Richard L. Bare	Fenton Earnshaw	December 5, 1958
When a journalist is kidnapped in East Berlin, his newspaper bosses hire Stuart to find him and free him. With Jacqueline Scott.
10	10	"Vicious Circle"	Leslie H. Martinson	Story by : Jack Emanuel and Jim Barnett; Teleplay by : Richard Brady Macaulay and Frederic Brady	December 12, 1958
Kookie witnesses a kidnapping, but the police won't investigate as no missing persons report has been filed. With Harold J. Stone and Bert Convy; Byron Keith debuts as Lt. Gilmore.
11	11	"One False Step"	James V. Kern	Teleplay by : George & Gertrude Fass and Howard Browne; From a screenplay by : Raymond Chandler and Czenzi Ormonde; Adaptation by : Whitfield Cook; Novel by : Patricia Highsmith	December 19, 1958
Jeff and Stuart are hired by a politician who was approached to 'exchange' murders in this adaptation of Strangers on a Train. With Richard Long as Mark Harrington, and Connie Stevens as Pat Forsythe.
12	12	"The Court Martial of Johnny Murdo"	Lee Sholem	William L. Stuart	December 26, 1958
Jeff is hired by a wealthy family to investigate the theft of funds from a military academy, after the family's son Johnny (Peter Miles) is court-martialed for the theft and expelled.
13	13	"Hit and Run"	Leslie H. Martinson	Story by : John and Ward Hawkins; Teleplay by : John Hawkins and James Gunn	January 2, 1959
Kookie, having borrowed Stu's car, drives by a hit and run accident that killed two people – then a mysterious blonde repeatedly tries to run him off Sunset Boulevard. When the police finger Kookie as the hit and run driver, Stu tries to untangle the web that's ensnared him too. With Sue Randall.
14	14	"Not an Enemy in the World"	Alan Crosland Jr.	Story by : Barry Trivers; Teleplay by : Leonard Lee	January 9, 1959
Suzanne's brother Marcel is missing, and with business slow at the agency, Jeff agrees to take on the case for free.
15	15	"The Secret of Adam Cain"	Montgomery Pittman	Montgomery Pittman	January 16, 1959
Stu is hired by an eccentric British brother and sister to retrieve an inexpensive vase with apparent great sentimental value – and finds himself immediately up to his neck in dangerous characters. With Don Gordon.
16	16	"The Girl Who Couldn't Remember"	George Waggner	Story by : Howard J. Green and Al Martin; Teleplay by : Leonard Lee	January 23, 1959
Sandra Carter (Nancy Gates) has amnesia and hires Jeff to help her discover who she is, and why her purse contains $10,000. Mitch Abercrombie (John Vivyan) is determined to steal the money from her.
17	17	"Dark Vengeance"	Richard L. Bare	Frederic Brady	January 30, 1959
A journalist friend of Stu's is attacked and blinded, after trying to expose the illegal narcotics trade. Stu takes up the case and is soon marked for murder. With Adele Mara and Jonathan Haze.
18	18	"Conspiracy of Silence"	Charles F. Haas	Story by : Frederic Brady and Anna Perrelli; Teleplay by : Frederic Brady	February 6, 1959
Jeff goes undercover as a college student to protect a young woman who is the target of a death threat, and to try to solve a months-old campus murder. With Gerald Mohr and Pat Crowley.
19	19	"Eyewitness"	David Lowell Rich	Story by : Jack Emanuel; Teleplay by : Peter R. Brooke	February 13, 1959
A young boy (Jay North) is rescued by Stu after he falls off a roof – but the boy had witnessed a murder just before he fell. With Patricia Barry.
20	20	"Lovely Alibi"	George Waggner	William L. Stuart	February 20, 1959
An old OSS buddy of Stu's is now a police officer with a drinking problem, who also happens to have a girlfriend mixed up in a mobster murder case. While suspended from the force, he asks for Stu's help in uncovering the truth about what happened. With Claude Akins.
21	21	"In Memoriam"	Richard L. Bare	Irwin Winehouse and A. Sanford Wolf	February 27, 1959
A book publisher reads his own obituary in the newspaper. Interpreting it as a death threat from someone who wants to stop him from publishing, he hires Stu to investigate. With Dolores Donlon and Ellen Corby.
22	22	"The Fifth Stair"	Vincent Sherman	Teleplay by : Lowell Barrington; From the play by : Frederick Knott	March 6, 1959
A man is convinced his wife is having an affair with Jeff, and so hires a hit man to kill him. This is a direct (credited) adaptation of Dial M for Murder, even going so far as to retain some of the same character names. Featuring Richard Long as Tony Wendice, and Julie Adams as Margot Wendice. Note that when Kookie does a brief Bugs Bunny impression, the voice is provided by an uncredited Mel Blanc.
23	23	"The Pasadena Caper"	Montgomery Pittman	N.B. Stone, Jr.	May 13, 1959
Stu, investigating a long-missing person, finds him drowned – and also finds the circumstances might point to the guilt of his doddering, elderly female clients.
24	24	"Hong Kong Caper"	George Waggner	Story by : George Waggner; Teleplay by : Steve Fisher	March 20, 1959
The son of an old OSS friend of Stu's is killed in Hong Kong. With Stu tied up with other work, Jeff heads there to investigate. With Karen Steele, Neil Hamilton and Kathleen Freeman.
25	25	"A Check Will Do Nicely"	Ida Lupino	Story by : Alan Caillou; Teleplay by : Dwight Taylor	March 27, 1959
Stu travels to Europe to track down and rescue the victim of a kidnapping. With Edward Platt.
26	26	"The Grandma Caper"	David Butler	Story by : Maurita Pittman; Teleplay by : Frederic Brady	April 3, 1959
Jeff is hired to keep an eye on a wealthy eccentric (Frances Bavier) who routinely shoplifts from her own stores. With Jerome Cowan.
27	27	"Honey from the Bee"	George Waggner	Story by : Michael Forrestier; Teleplay by : Charles Hoffman	April 10, 1959
Stu and Kookie try to sort things out when a series of murders seems to be connected to a seemingly worthless Russian tapestry. With Ruta Lee, Connie Stevens, Jay Novello, Celia Lovsky and (in an uncredited cameo) Dimitri Tiomkin.
28	28	"Abra-Cadaver"	Mark Sandrich Jr.	Story by : Christopher Monig; Teleplay by : Talbot Jennings	April 17, 1959
Jeff works undercover to break up a ring of con artists who use are using false identities and dead bodies to run an insurance scam. With Fay Spain and Pernell Roberts.
29	29	"A Bargain in Tombs"	Reginald LeBorg	Teleplay by : Charles Hoffman; From the novel by : Aaron Marc Stein	April 24, 1959
While in Paris, Stu is hired to track down a young woman who is missing and was last seen in Rome. Arriving in Rome, he runs into an old OSS pal and an art smuggling ring. With Louise Fletcher, Ray Danton and Bart Braverman.
30	30	"The Widow Wouldn't Weep"	Arthur Lubin	Story by : Howard Browne; Teleplay by : Frederic Brady	May 1, 1959
Jeff, assisted by Kookie, works to prove a client's philandering husband was killed, rather than committed suicide.
31	31	"Downbeat"	Montgomery Pittman	Story by : Maurita Pittman; Teleplay by : Montgomery Pittman	May 8, 1959
Stuart is tried for sedition when he allows important government documents to be photographed. Though he's acquitted, he loses his P.I. licence, quits the firm, and spirals into alcoholism. Then some of his old espionage contacts resurface, urging him to return to his old life – but working for which side? With John Van Dreelen, Dorothy Provine, and (in a brief cameo as himself) James Garner. A sequel to this episode (called "Upbeat") aired towards the end of season 4.
32	32	"Canine Caper"	George Waggner	Fenton Earnshaw	May 15, 1959
Kookie falls for a French actress, and tries to clear her name when she's accused of being part of a diamond smuggling ring that Jeff is investigating. With Roxane Berard and Julie Adams.
33	33	"Mr. Paradise"	Arthur Lubin	Story by : Frederic Brady and Richard Kebbon; Teleplay by : Frederic Brady	May 22, 1959
Stu is hired to investigate a religious cult run by the charismatic but sinister Mr. Paradise (Andrew Duggan).
34	34	"Strange Girl in Town"	George Waggner	Story by : Howard Browne; Teleplay by : Frederic Brady	May 29, 1959
A friend of Suzanne's witnesses a murder at a club Jeff had recommended to her. Guilt-stricken, Jeff and Roscoe work to keep her safe while trying to solve the crime. With Sue Randall, Alan Baxter and Carol Ohmart.

=== Season 2: 1959–60 ===
No. overall	No. in season	Title	Directed by	Written by	Original release date
35	1	"Only Zeroes Count"	George Waggner	Story by : Howard Browne; Teleplay by : William L. Stuart and Howard Browne	October 2, 1959
Stuart Bailey witnesses a crime while vacationing in Hawaii. There he encounters taxi driver Kim Quisado (Poncie Ponce) and Hawaiian Eye detective Tom Lopaka (Robert Conrad)
36	2	"The Kookie Caper"	Montgomery Pittman	Maurita Pittman	October 9, 1959
Man fleeing a murder scene is unaware a pretty runaway is hiding in his backseat. When they arrive at 77 Sunset Strip, Kookie avidly takes in the teenager to protect her from the killers. But the ginchy Carrie doesn't want to hide, she's come to Hollywood to crash the movies and meet Sugarfoot. Bailey & Spencer's sleazy rival, Shamus Legs Carson weasels in on the case when he hears there's a big reward for finding the starstruck teen. Guest star: Sherry Jackson (who is the daughter of writer Maurita Pittman, and the stepdaughter of director Montgomery Pittman)
37	3	"Six Superior Skirts"	André De Toth	Story by : Richard Wormser; Teleplay by : William L. Stuart	October 16, 1959
A charity benefit with debutantes of 6 American cities; each is wearing jewelry from a prized collection. A diamond replaced with a fake. Bailey, Kookie, and others are present to protect the jewelry. Miss Augusta (GA) likes Kookie.
38	4	"Clay Pigeon"	Arthur Lubin	Story by : Jim Barnett; Teleplay by : Leonard Lee	October 23, 1959
Stu is hired by talent agent Mildred De Witt (Paula Raymond), allegedly on behalf of antagonistic talk show host Sam Gurney (Dan Tobin). When Gurney tells Stu he did not hire him, both wonder what Mildred is really up to. Mildred, in turn, claims she is as baffled as they are.
39	5	"Thanks for Tomorrow"	Mark Sandrich Jr.	W.R. Burnett	October 30, 1959
Crime syndicate hires a gambler to layoff racetrack bets to out-of-state bookies to keep the odds from diving. The go-between Lonnie Drew is an old pal of Jeff Spencer, whose help is needed when Drew suspects that he's going to be set up with a briefcase full of hot semolians. It's a boat race scheme, i.e. the other horses' owners are paid to lose to the long-shots backed by the Syndicate. Guest star: Mary Tyler Moore
40	6	"Sing Something Simple"	George Waggner	Fenton Earnshaw	November 6, 1959
An opera diva is almost sandbagged on stage, but she doesn't want any gendarmes involved, so her manager hires opera-loving Stu to investigate. Posing as her new paramour, Stu flushes her torch-bearing ex-husband and a hot-tempered tenor out of the scenery as suspects. Kookie almost ankles from his square, undercover assignment as a spear-carrier, but a blonde ingénue from the Bronx keeps him on task.
41	7	"The Treehouse Caper"	George Waggner	Joel Kane & Jack Lloyd	November 13, 1959
Spencer, the police, the insurance company and the daughter of a thief are all looking for $250,000 of buried jewelry.
42	8	"Out of the Past"	Charles F. Haas	Stephen Kandel	November 20, 1959
Nov.1959: Bailey makes a difficult choice when the government asks him to go to Germany for an assignment involving a traitor spy.
43	9	"The Widow and the Web"	George Waggner	Leonard Lee	November 27, 1959
Seductive widow suspected of offing her husband via an industrial accident, when she goes after PI Jeff Spencer and almost every available (& unavailable) man at her husband's plant. When an anonymous note alleges the worker was murdered, the factory's insurance company hires Jeff to investigate.
44	10	"Secret Island"	George Waggner	Leonard Lee	December 4, 1959
When flying from the Philippines, Stu, his prisoner, and four other survivors of a plane crash reach an isolated island, only to discover that it’s the target of an h-bomb test. Guest stars: Pierre D'Albert (Jacques Bergerac), Carol Miller (Kathleen Crowley), Barrie Connell (Tuesday Weld), Amanda Connell (Catherine McLeod), Dave Connell (Grant Sullivan)
45	11	"The Texas Doll"	André De Toth	Story by : Jo Pagano; Teleplay by : Jerry Davis	December 11, 1959
Jeff Spencer investigates a mob-backed fortune hunter on the prowl for a rich widow or her step-daughter. Guest star: Sherry Jackson
46	12	"Vacation with Pay"	James V. Kern	Herman Epstein	December 18, 1959
Stu and Kookie chaperone the 23 and 18 year-old daughters of a wealthy businessman on a trip to Paris.
47	13	"The Jukebox Caper"	Ida Lupino	Fenton Earnshaw	December 25, 1959
Jeff and Kookie infiltrate a crooked music business to prove one of its singers didn't commit suicide.
48	14	"Created He Them"	George Waggner	Story by : George Waggner; Teleplay by : George Waggner and Howie Horwitz	January 1, 1960
Stu is hired to find who killed Dr. Adams handicapped husband otherwise she will have to plead it was a mercy killing.
49	15	"Collector's Item"	William J. Hole Jr.	Leo Townsend	January 8, 1960
Jeff's new client is Countess Maruska who hires him in regards to her art collection. What seems like a simple case has Jeff roughed up and kidnapped. Kookie decides to be a music impresario.
50	16	"Switchburg"	Montgomery Pittman	Montgomery Pittman	January 15, 1960
Art Moomey hires Stuart Bailey to look into an old hotel he wants to buy in a small town named Switchburg in the Nevada desert. Stuart finds a hotel that has been boarded up and out of use for years and a town much the same. There are only a handful of residents left and his questions raise suspicions. And there's the matter of the mysterious light people see coming from the hotel at night.
51	17	"The One That Got Away"	Everett Sloane	Story by : Leonard Lee & Don Tait; Teleplay by : Jerry Davis	January 22, 1960
Though he would still receive billing in the opening credits, this is Edward Byrne's last episode until May. He would miss 16 consecutive episodes, as he held out for a more substantial on-screen role, and better pay.
52	18	"Ten Cents a Death"	George Waggner	Story by : Leonard Lee & Don Tait; Teleplay by : Peter R. Brooke	January 29, 1960
Two employees of a dance hall are murdered so the agency goes under cover there to investigate.
53	19	"Who Killed Cock Robin"	Montgomery Pittman	Story by : Arthur & Irwin Porges; Teleplay by : N.B. Stone, Jr. and Montgomery Pittman	February 5, 1960
Jeff, along with Suzanne, accompany a blind man James to an out of town reading of a will. The gathering consists of Hollywood types who stand to inherit one million dollars if they complete a puzzle but a murder interferes with the game. Guest stars John Holland as Robin Wells. Fay Wray, Don "Red" Barry, Neil Hamilton, Myrna Fahey
54	20	"Condor's Lair"	George Waggner	Gloria Elmore	February 12, 1960
Stu's case is author and party girl Kitten after an attempt is made on her life. With help from Star he provides protection while discovering she's being blackmailed while dallying with married man Stacy. An unexpected murder changes things. Guest stars Troy Donahue, Tuesday Weld
55	21	"The Starlet"	André De Toth	Story by : Sig Herzig; Teleplay by : Sig Herzig and Ed Jurist	February 26, 1960
Jeff is hired to look into attempts on actress Kay Donnelly's life but her sudden suicide leaves him with questions. The rooming house where she lived seems to be full of suspects except for the wisecracking Marge. A secret marriage points to a killer. Guest stars Diane McBain, Joanie Sommers, Linda Watkins, Paul Lukather
56	22	"Safari"	George Waggner	Bernard C. Schoenfeld	March 4, 1960
Stu is hired to protect belligerent business mogul Simon Galbraith on an African hunting trip. The rude man brings along a number of people who wish him ill, foremost wife Miriam. Stu does his job despite a distaste for his client and his actions. Guest stars: Simon Galbraith (Arch Johnson), Miriam Galbraith (Julie Adams), Kurt Heller (Kurt Kreuger)
57	23	"Blackout"	Herbert L. Strock	Story by : Don Tait & Larry Menkin; Teleplay by : Leonard Lee	March 11, 1960
When Suzanne is kidnapped by escaping jewel thieves, Jeff and the police must find a way of catching up with them before it is too late for Suzanne.
58	24	"Return to San Dede (The Desert Story) Part One"	Montgomery Pittman	Montgomery Pittman	March 18, 1960
Rúben De Leon (George J. Lewis) hires Bailey as a bodyguard for Roxanna Ferrales (Andra Martin) on a train to her home country, the fictional San Dede in Latin America. (Lewis played Zorro's father Don Alejandro in the 1950s Disney television series Zorro)
59	25	"Return to San Dede (Capital City) Part Two"	Montgomery Pittman	Montgomery Pittman	March 25, 1960
After Bailey is shot, Jeff Spencer investigates.
60	26	"Publicity Brat"	Leslie H. Martinson	Story by : Jerry Davis; Teleplay by : Richard DeRoy	April 1, 1960
Stu is hired by Paula Conway, mother of a spoiled child star Angel, when a valuable jewel goes missing. What seems like a simple case although one populated by unlikable characters turns serious when a murder occurs endangering Angel. Guest star: Billie Burke as Mavis Matthews Conway, Evelyn Rudie as her publicity-seeking actress grandchild Angel Conway. Pamela Britton as Angel's mother Paula Conway. Beau Gentry as the murder victim Nick Devlin.
61	27	"The Fix"	Robert B. Sinclair	Steven Ritch	April 8, 1960
Spencer is nearly killed while investigating a boxer's death in a fixed fight. Guest star: Mary Tyler Moore
62	28	"Legend of Crystal Dart"	Montgomery Pittman	Gloria Elmore	April 15, 1960
Bailey is hired by Crystal Dart a famous entertainer who became famous in Paris after the war. He is to deliver papers to her soon-to-be ex-husband who has taken residence in her rundown ski lodge. She wants him out. Ken Dexter is helping Crystal write her autobiography and he tries to warn Bailey off. Bailey doesn't scare and he and Crystal along with Dexter drive into the mountains to serve the papers. Kurt, Dart's husband, is in a cast from a skiing accident and he is being cared for by Marie, a local nurse. Dexter's wife Janice also soon shows up and informs them that the snow has covered the road and they are all stranded. Tempers flare in the claustrophobic lodge and soon one of the party winds up dead. Marilyn Maxwell, as former Parisian Folies Bergère star Crystal Dart, sings "As Time Goes By" for Stu. Kurt Kreuger appears as her estranged Swiss national ski instructor husband Kurt Weibel. Crystal alludes to Kurt having a shady past.
63	29	"Stranger Than Fiction"	George Waggner	Story by : Herman Epstein; Teleplay by : Herman Epstein and Ed Jurist	April 22, 1960
Jeff is hired by a wealthy middle-aged man who wants his missing young wife found. The client refuses to believe she has left him for a younger man but Jeff thinks otherwise. With Roscoe's help, she is quickly spotted but, before her husband can be contacted, a new situation has developed - she is being held for ransom.
64	30	"Genesis of Treason"	George Waggner	Charles Sinclair	April 29, 1960
Stuart is asked by the United States military to investigate whether classified documents were passed on to a foreign country. Bailey becomes close to Marta, a friend of the suspected spy Hollister creating conflict. Dianne Foster as Marta Wentworth
65	31	"Fraternity of Fear"	Robert B. Sinclair	Story by : Richard Stenger; Teleplay by : Richard Stenger and W. Hermanos	May 6, 1960
Jeff is hired by the Connors, parents of a student who died in an apparent hazing incident. Jeff poses as a student, living in the fraternity where he learns of rampant cheating by the football team which may be tied to the death. Note: "W. Hermanos" does not exist. During a Writers Guild strike, Warner Brothers Television continued to shoot new episodes of their various series by slightly rewriting the scripts of old TV episodes. The nom de plume put on these "new" scripts was "W. Hermanos" ("Hermanos" being Spanish for "Brothers").
66	32	"Spark of Freedom"	Charles F. Haas	Story by : Richard Grey; Teleplay by : W. Hermanos	May 13, 1960
Stu travels to Budapest to free a political prisoner, donning various disguises in the process.
67	33	"Perfect Setup"	Montgomery Pittman	Story by : Roy Huggins; Teleplay by : W. Hermanos	May 20, 1960
Jeff goes to capture a thief sneaking back via a remote corner of the Islands. PI Jeff poses as a wandering gigolo, signing on as a guitar-strumming lounge act to attract lonely women to a struggling resort. Cricket Blake chirps along with him, but the new competition brings out the worst in a scheming philanderer and a torch-bearing local police chief. Guest stars: Mel Dixon (Warren Stevens), Victor King (Skip Ward), Jessica King (Joyce Meadows), Carol Irwin (Myrna Hansen), Ed Sudano (Paul Bryar), Philip Van Zandt (Tyler McVey)
68	34	"Sierra"	George Waggner	Story by : Steve Frazee; Teleplay by : W. Hermanos	May 27, 1960
Man-eating cat stalks the Sierras, making Stu's inquiry about a friend's daughter a low priority with frazzled mountain residents. Stu's old buddy suspects his daughter is rebelling against his strict single-parenting by getting mixed-up with shady characters. A mild-mannered geology professor boarding at the buddy's house, packing heat on his wilderness sabbatical makes Stu wary too. Guest stars: Sherry Jackson, Anthony George. Edd Brynes returns as 'Kookie' as of this episode.
69	35	"The Silent Caper"	George Waggner	Roger Smith	June 3, 1960
Stripper Jingle Bells, key witness in a mob trial, is kidnapped to keep her from testifying. Jeff spots her being held in an apartment, then identifies her when he finds one of her trademark "jingle bell" earrings on the sidewalk. Jeff pursues when the kidnapper moves her to a mountain ranch off Route 66. Written by series regular Roger Smith. There is no spoken dialogue of any kind in the episode.
70	36	"Family Skeleton"	Reginald LeBorg	Story by : Jonathan Haze; Teleplay by : Jonathan Haze and James Gunn	June 10, 1960
When an old friend of Stu is kidnapped, he's asked to deliver the ransom money. He soon begins to wonder if his friend's wife, a former singer with mob connections, his spoiled young sister, or the secretary who's in love with him, had anything to do with the kidnapping.

=== Season 3: 1960–61 ===
No. overall	No. in season	Title	Directed by	Written by	Original release date
71	1	"Attic"	Montgomery Pittman	Joseph Manson	September 16, 1960
Jeff Spencer is trapped in a farmhouse attic. Guest cast: John Dehner, Kathleen Crowley, Robert Colbert, Lee Van Cleef, Gary Vinson, Manning Ross, Jack Mather, Rickey Kelman, Rusty Stevens, Robert Pittman, Mickey Simpson, Cynthia Pepper
72	2	"The Fanatics"	William J. Hole Jr.	Story by : Seeleg Lester; Teleplay by : Allen Chasen	September 23, 1960
Stu Bailey is protecting a diplomat attempting to negotiate a Middle Eastern peace treaty. Guest cast: Bert Convy, Joe DeSantis, Marcel Dalio, Margaret Thomas, Tris Coffin, Oliver McGowan, Paul Dubov, Jan Arvan, Victor Buono, V. J. Ardwin, Joseph Abdullah, Jeff DeBenning
73	3	"The President's Daughter"	James V. Kern	Lee Stanley	September 30, 1960
Jeff Spencer and Rex Randolph go undercover as peasants in a Latin American island nation to protect the daughter of the country's president. Richard Long (seen previously as different characters in two episodes in season 1) debuts as Rex Randolph. Guest cast: George Tobias, Rodolfo Hoyos, Lisa Montell, Jacqueline Ravell, Leonard Strong, Miguel Landa, John Verros, Albert Carrier, Carolyn Comant
74	4	"The Office Caper"	William J. Hole Jr.	Montgomery Pittman	October 7, 1960
A mobster plot to kill Stu Bailey entraps Jeff Spencer. Guest cast: Sherry Jackson, Richard Jaeckel, Bruce Gordon, Robert McQueeney, J. Edward McKinley
75	5	"The Widescreen Caper"	George Waggner	Story by : Monica Morrow; Teleplay by : Daniel Ward	October 14, 1960
Following predictions of misfortune, a Hollywood film festival hires all four of the firm's detectives (Stu Bailey, Jeff Spencer, Rex Randolph and Gerald Lloyd "Kookie" Kookson III) to oversee safety. Guest cast: Sharon Hugueny, Paula Raymond, Ruta Lee, Judy Dan, Beatrice Kay, Walter Reed, Lili Kardell, Jim Millhollin, David Cross, Buddy Lester, Frankie Ortega Trio
76	6	"The Negotiable Blonde"	Mark Sandrich Jr.	Story by : Gene Levitt; Teleplay by : Alice B. Thomas	October 21, 1960
Jeff Spencer goes to Acapulco in search of funds missing from a company's treasury. Guest cast: Karen Steele, Rhodes Reason, Jay Novello, Henry Corden, Marianna Hill, Saundra Edwards, Barbara Baxter
77	7	"The Laurel Canyon Caper"	George Waggner	Dean Riesner	October 28, 1960
A singing film star (Jock Mahoney) is suspected of murder and Rex Randolph is hired to find the actual killer. Guest cast: Jock Mahoney, Kaye Elhardt, Fredd Wayne, Peter Leeds, Roxanne Arlen, John Hubbard, Gary Conway, Gayla Graves, Lewis Charles, Paul Lukather
78	8	"Double Trouble"	George Waggner	Leonard Lee	November 4, 1960
Stu Bailey pretends to be a hitman in order to gather evidence against mob boss Silk Cipriano (Bruce Cabot). Guest cast: Bruce Cabot, Dolores Donlon, John Dennis, Frank Nechero, William Forrest, Max Baer, Bert Freed (unbilled)
79	9	"Trouble in the Middle East"	Montgomery Pittman	Montgomery Pittman	November 11, 1960
Vacationing in a Middle Eastern country, Jeff Spencer rescues the president's beautiful daughter (Sherry Jackson) from rebels. Guest cast: Sherry Jackson, George Lewis, Mario Alcalde, Henry Brandon, Paul Dubov, Ted Wedderspoon, Katherine Henryk, Jay Adler, Ken Tilles, Paul Marco, Vic Tayback
80	10	"The Duncan Shrine"	Irving J. Moore	Gloria Elmore	November 18, 1960
Rex Randolph devotes time to solving the mystery of Rose Durkee (Meg Wyllie), a veiled woman who continues visiting a long-gone iconic cowboy movie star's tomb. Guest cast: Donald Woods, Richard Deacon, Barbara Gates, Judith Rawlins, Marjorie Bennett, Sally Todd, Fern Barry, Frankie Ortega (unbilled)
81	11	"The Double Death of Benny Markham"	Robert B. Sinclair	Leonard Lee	November 25, 1960
Jeff Spencer helps on old ally, retired safecracker Benny Markham. Guest cast: Walter Burke, Gale Garnett, Tudor Owen, Lester Matthews, Jennifer Raine, Fredrick Ledebur, Jacqueline Squire, Kendrick Huxham, Diana Crawford, Peter Forster; Note: Peter Forster and Jennifer Raine were married from 1959 to 1966.
82	12	"The Antwerp Caper"	George Waggner	Story by : George Waggner; Teleplay by : Catherine Kuttner and George Waggner	December 2, 1960
Stu Bailey is hired by a wealthy couple to investigate whether a young woman in Belgium is really their daughter who was lost during World War II. Guest cast: Karen Steele, John van Dreelen, John Banner, Penny Santon, Roger Til, Dale Van Sickel
83	13	"The Affairs of Adam Gallante"	Irving J. Moore	Gloria Elmore	December 9, 1960
Jeff Spencer, Kookie, and Roscoe trace the whereabouts of missing bridegroom Adam Gallante who had been intimately connected with numerous attractive women. Guest cast: Alvy Moore, Sue Randall, Carol Ohmart, Carmen Phillips, Marianne Gaba, Norma Varden, Robert Quarry, Alana Ladd, Frankie Ortega Trio
84	14	"The Valley Caper"	Robert Douglas	Douglas Morrow	December 16, 1960
Rex Randolph is hired to protect an up and coming actress Abigail Allen (Kathleen Crowley) pretending to be a fellow performer. He gets emotionally involved as he learns an ex-con is a suspect but it's the woman's secrets that put her in the most danger. Guest cast: Tristram Coffin, Ken Mayer, Dennis Holmes, Reedy Talton, David Alpert, William A. Forester
85	15	"The Dresden Doll"	William J. Hole Jr.	Story by : Howard Lee; Teleplay by : Emily Bronson	December 13, 1960
Roscoe recognizes Dolly Stewart (Myrna Fahey) when she hires Spencer as her bodyguard, whose much older husband (Raymond Bailey) is in the hospital. Dolly flirts with Roscoe, who tells Spencer the only reason she would do that, is to seduce someone into murdering her husband. Her ex-boyfriend Jerry Brent (H. M. Wynant) is suspiciously lurking around.
86	16	"The Rice Estate"	Robert Douglas	Montgomery Pittman	December 30, 1960
Stu Bailey is hired on credit to represent widowed heiress Eunice Rice (Peggy McCay). She is receiving anonymous telephone calls attempting to blackmail her, but has no cash on hand to pay anyone. She showed the blackmail letters to the police, who are in doubt as to whether or not the blackmail is credible. A virtual recluse since her widowhood, Stu is one person she feels she can trust. He invites all the partners and employees of the detective agency, and a few other friends, for a costume party in the Rice house. Guest cast: Colton Rice Jr. (Gary Conway), Russian (Montgomery Pittman), Girl (Cecile Rogers,) Bobby (Charles Hicks), Will (Jean Paul King)
87	17	"The Hamlet Caper"	Irving J. Moore	Story by : Everett Sloane; Teleplay by : Ed Jurist and Everett Sloane	January 6, 1961
An egocentric actor has a series of "accidents" causing the nervous producer of the show the actor is in to hire Rex to solve who is trying to off the pompous actor. Lots of suspects, but thanks to a poisoned canteen the killer is found. Guest cast: Andrew Duggan, Nina Shipman, Faith Domergue, Neil Hamilton, Richard Garland, John Wengraf, Michael Harris
88	18	"The Man in the Mirror"	Paton Price	Henry Slesar	January 13, 1961
A man with split personality hires Bailey and Spencer to protect him from his would-be murderer--his own alter ego. Guest cast: Karl Swenson, Robert Colbert, Tris Coffin, Connie Davis, Gayla Graves, Vana Leslie, George Werier, Charles Seel
89	19	"The College Caper"	Robert Douglas	Douglas Morrow	January 20, 1961
Stu Bailey and Gerald "Kookie" Kookson are hired to protect a mobster's son who is a college football star. Bailey goes undercover as a professor and Kookie pretends to be a student. Guest cast: Chad Everett, Alan Baxter, Marian McKnight, Claudia Barrett, Steve Mitchell, Karl Lukas, William Forrest, Karen Parker, Julie Van Zandt
90	20	"Mr. Goldilocks"	Andrew McCullough	Montgomery Pittman & Roger Smith	January 27, 1961
Spencer is stalked through the desert by husband and wife jewel thieves who want to kill him. Guest cast: Sue Ane Langdon, Mike Road, Will Wright, Adam Williams
91	21	"The Corsican Caper"	Leslie H. Martinson	Gloria Elmore	February 3, 1961
Everyone at the detective agency helps to protect Suzanne when the swindler who took her money is murdered. Supporting cast: Vana Leslie, Douglas Dick, Max Baer, Marjorie Stapp, Dawn Wells, Joseph Holland
92	22	"Once Upon a Caper"	George Waggner	Roger Smith	February 10, 1961
A comic variation on Rashomon: Jeff and Stu each tell Rex the story of how their partnership started, with both investigators working different ends of a car-theft ring investigation which ensnares a pal of Kookie's. However, the details of the story -- especially with regard to who the hero of the tale is -- vary significantly with each teller. And Kookie's version of the story is even more unlikely! Guest cast: John Hubbard, Carolyn Komant, Brad Weston, Lennie Bremen, Mike London, Joan Staley, Jack Daly
93	23	"Strange Bedfellows"	Paton Price	Sonya Roberts	February 17, 1961
Jeff is hired by Maritza, a much married socialite to steal her jewels in an insurance scam. When he turns her down she frames him for theft. But it's her missing love letters that have several Hollywood lotharios on edge. Guest cast: Kathleen Crowley, Lee Patrick, Oscar Beregi, John Gabriel, Fay Baker, Richard Rust, Paul Dubov, Herb Vigran, Ty Hardin. Note: Ty Hardin was the star of Warners' Western series Bronco, which ran on ABC from 1958 to 1962. This episode was seen three days before the Bronco episode "The Buckbrier Trail." Crowley's character of German actress Maritza Vector is an impersonation of Hungarian actress Zsa Zsa Gabor.
94	24	"Face in the Window"	Robert Douglas	Charles B. Smith	February 24, 1961
Rex Randolph has to solve the suspicious killing of a young actress' stalker. Guest cast: Merry Anders, Paula Raymond, Joe DeSantis, Dee Carroll, Peter Breck (who would later co-star with Richard Long on The Big Valley)
95	25	"Tiger by the Tail"	Sutton Roley	Fenton Earnshaw	March 3, 1961
Stu Bailey and Gerald "Kookie" Kookson see to it that a Middle Eastern potentate is safe from harm and, during the assignment, Kookie falls in love with the ruler's daughter. Guest cast: John van Dreelen, Sharon Hugueny, Merry Anders, Theodore Marcuse, Peter Humphreys, Lucienne Auclair, John Baer, Herman Rudin, Keith Richards and Roger Moore. Note: Roger Moore was the fourth season co-star of Warners' Western series Maverick, which ran on ABC from 1957 to 1962. This episode was seen two days before the Maverick episode "Red Dog," the final episode starring Moore as cousin Beau Maverick. (Maverick would continue without Moore.)
96	26	"The Space Caper"	George Waggner	Fenton Earnshaw	March 10, 1961
Jeff enters the world of espionage when he is asked to impersonate a brilliant scientist. He must keep up the subterfuge as he tries to ferret out who might be passing on intelligence to the nation's enemies. Guest cast: Arthur Franz, Coleen Gray, Kasey Rogers, Tod Andrews, Jean Porter, Otto Waldis, Jack Livesey, Harry Holcombe, Bill Halop
97	27	"Open and Close in One"	Jeffrey Hayden	Gloria Elmore	March 17, 1961
Baxter Kellogg, a former star, is attempting a comeback but loses his luck charm at a party. Stu is hired to locate it but finds instead a secretive wife, a resentful nephew, an unemployed starlet plus a blackmailer who meets misfortune. Guest cast: Julie Adams, Buddy Ebsen, Joel Grey, Carol Ohmart, Dawn Wells, Wallace Rooney, Gayla Graves, Keith Richards
98	28	"The Legend of Leckonby"	Robert Douglas	Robert C. Dennis	March 24, 1961
Jeff is asked by Lt. Gilmore to look into the disappearance of $85,000 hidden by gambler Stanley, recently out of prison. Jeff gets nowhere as his fiancée Francie and friends claim ignorance. But a murder changes the investigation's course. Guest cast: Rochelle Hudson, Richard Carlyle, Jean Allison, Robert Foulk, Victor Buono, Ed Prentiss
99	29	"Old Card Sharps Never Die"	Robert Sparr	Story by : Leonard Brown; Teleplay by : William Bruckner	March 31, 1961
Rex heads to an old mining town, hired by the local boss Henning. After he turns down the job he's prevented from leaving. He becomes involved with Notch who holds the deed to a valuable claim that several of the locals want their hands on. Guest cast: Lisa Gaye, Robert Lowery, Robert Colbert, William Fawcett, Richard Garland, Walter Reed, George Wallace, Maurice Manson, Jack Halliday
100	30	"Vamp 'til Ready"	George Waggner	Gloria Elmore	April 7, 1961
Stu is hired to find a missing husband, David Todd a once well known pianist who left the spotlight. Stu finds him playing at out of the way club where David insists his wife wants him back to murder him. Events unfold that the investigator must untangle. Guest cast: Janet Lake, Bert Convy, Kaye Elhardt, Brad Weston, Art Tenen, John van Dreelen
101	31	"The Common Denominator"	Paton Price	Montgomery Pittman & Roger Smith	April 14, 1961
Lt. Gilmore enlists Jeff when he's perplexed by a series of unrelated murders. Spencer's work reveals all had a connection to boats plus spoke French. Jeff enlists Suzanne's help but an encounter with a surly marina owner puts her at risk. Guest cast: Phillip Terry, Connie Davis, Paul Birch, Frank Gerstle, Gil Stuart, Michele Montau, John Damler
102	32	"The 6 Out of 8 Caper"	Andrew McCullough	Robert Vincent Wright	April 21, 1961
Wealthy horse racing enthusiast Barbara Wentworth hires Stu Bailey to find out how bookkeeper Wilmer Zaleski keeps picking winners at the track. Guest cast: Patrice Wymore, Jay Novello, Gordon Jones, Robert Hutton, William Kendis, Nelson Olmsted
103	33	"The Celluloid Cowboy"	Jeffrey Hayden	Gloria Elmore	April 28, 1961
Jeff is hired by Fay Dakota to protect her estranged husband Flint on the set of his comeback western. A series of mishaps have plagued the film plus Flint's interest in starlet Rhonda creates complications as Jeff and Roscoe work as extras. Guest cast: Donna Douglas, Kent Taylor, Hal Baylor, Christine Nelson, Andrew Duggan, Peggy McCay. Note: Andrew Duggan and Peggy McCay, who were not married to each other, have a brief scene in this episode as Mr. and Mrs. Dakota. Nine months later (January 27, 1962) was the premiere of their Warners' domestic sitcom Room for One More. Between 1957 and 1984, they appeared together in episodes of at least 20 other TV series, most of which cast them as a married couple.
104	34	"The Eyes of Love"	Robert Douglas	Gloria Elmore	May 5, 1961
When Stu's pilot friend Hal is fired for reporting a dead body that disappears Stu decides to help. A vehicle search reveals the involvement of advice columnist Amanda Strong and her gigolo husband Bowman that raises suspicions. Guest cast: Dorothy Green, Donald Buka, Richard Crane, Judy Lewis, Jess Kirkpatrick, Judith Rawlins
105	35	"Designing Eye"	Michael O'Herlihy	Leonard Lee	May 12, 1961
Jeff is hired by a high end swimwear company to discover why their new designs appear first at their primary competition. Jeff places Suzanne as a model at the firm that unravels a complicated series of deceptions. Guest cast: Rebecca Welles, Robert H. Harris, Carol Ohmart, Tony Travis, Richard Webb, Marianne Gaba
106	36	"Caper in E Flat"	Jeffrey Hayden	Robert J. Shaw	May 19, 1961
Morton Franklin hires Rex to find out who is trying to kill his client, singer Billy Boy Baines. Guest cast: Cloris Leachman, Carolyn Komant, Robert Logan, Harry Harvey, Sr., Barbara Luddy, Murray Alper, John Dehner, Evan McCord
107	37	"Hot Tamale Caper: Part I"	George Waggner	Fenton Earnshaw	May 26, 1961
Rex Randolph takes an assignment in South America, but news comes that his plane has exploded. Stu Bailey and Jeff Spencer suspect that he is still alive and has been taken prisoner. Guest cast: Donna Martell, Joseph De Santis, Carlos Romero, George J. Lewis, Sharon Landa, Harlan Warde, John Damler, John Verros, Jorge Moreno. Troy Donahue and Van Williams appear in their Surfside 6 roles as Sandy Winfield II and Ken Madison.
108	38	"Hot Tamale Caper: Part II"	George Waggner	Fenton Earnshaw	June 2, 1961
Rex Randolph has been drugged and kidnapped by corrupt South American government factions. Guest cast: Donna Martell, Joseph De Santis, Lisa Montell, Carlos Romero, George J. Lewis, Sharon Landa, Ric Roman, Jorge Moreno
109	39	"The Positive Negative"	Irving J. Moore	Charles Sinclair & Bill Finger	June 9, 1961
Rex Randolph's assignment to safeguard a very valuable tiara goes awry when the artifact is stolen. Final episode of Richard Long as Rex Randolph; Long would return as a guest in other roles in seasons 5 and 6. Guest cast: John Conte, Leslie Parrish, Mari Blanchard, Kurt Kreuger, Robin Hughes, Joseph Ruskin, Karen Parker, David Cross, Murray Kamelhar, David Janti, Frankie Ortega Trio

=== Season 4: 1961–62 ===
No. overall	No. in season	Title	Directed by	Written by	Original release date
110	1	"The Rival Eye Caper"	Jeffrey Hayden	Story by : William Pugsley and Sonya Roberts; Teleplay by : Sonya Roberts	September 22, 1961
Stu and Jeff run into a private eye business that is solving their jewel robbery cases instantly. They find it is a fence for receiving insurance money from the robberies. Guest cast: Chad Everett, Dawn Wells
111	2	"The Desert Spa Caper"	Robert Douglas	Charles Sinclair & William Finger	September 29, 1961
Suzanne goes undercover at females-only El Rancho Aphrodite when an actor dies suspiciously and a boozy actress is suspected of being involved. A studio hires Bailey & Spencer to help the bombshell make it through rehab, but someone sabotages her riding saddle and plants hooch in her drawer. Spa goers include a gossip columnist, a rival starlet, and others connected with the dead actor, such as a Waco riding instructor.
112	3	"The Man in the Crowd"	George Waggner	Montgomery Pittman & Roger Smith	October 6, 1961
A mysterious party calling himself "R.E. Venge" is out to kill Jeff, for reasons unknown. With Robert Colbert. Robert Logan debuts as J.R. Hale, though he's not yet the parking lot attendant -- he works at a gas station. (Though the character is listed in the credits as "Bob" he is very clearly and distinctly addressed only as "J.R." on multiple occasions.) Richard Long as Rex Randolph is seen in the opening credits, but does not appear in the episode.
113	4	"The Inverness Cape Caper"	Richard Bartlett	Howard Browne	October 13, 1961
Stu is used by an organized crime syndicate to find a lawyer that is to be murdered. When Stu emerges from unconsciousness, his job now is to find the men responsible. Guest cast: Jay Novello, Dawn Wells, Elisha Cook. As of this episode, Kookie is a full partner in the firm, taking over Rex's office in 104. Rex's absence is unexplained, although he is mentioned one further time later in the season (during the episode "Upbeat"). J.R., seen in the previous episode, is now the parking lot attendant at Dino's, taking over Kookie's old job.
114	5	"The Lady Has the Answers"	Richard Bartlett	Story by : Louis M. Heyward; Teleplay by : Whitman Chambers	October 20, 1961
An overly functional family spins Jeff's head like a Lazy Susan, over a murder/jewel heist where nothing makes sense. A precocious grandchild with a pet ocelot bedevils Roscoe, one daughter's missing, and sister Lally's draped all over Jeff. Narcotics, somnambulism, an asylum visit, an elusive psychiatrist, and a mother who makes as much sense as Gracie Allen challenge the Bailey & Spencer firm's patience and resources, as everyone feeds Lt. Gilmore straight lines.
115	6	"The Unremembered"	George Waggner	Frederic Brady	October 27, 1961
Stuart investigates the case of a cat burglar who wears costumes from old films. He suspects Roland Dumont, an unemployed actor who has not made a film in 20 years, and rents Dumont's estate to get close to the suspect.
116	7	"Big Boy Blue"	Jeffrey Hayden	Dean Riesner	November 3, 1961
Trumpet player Buddy Blue (Biff Elliot) is certain someone wants him dead
117	8	"The Cold Cash Caper"	Leslie Goodwins	Berne Giler	November 10, 1961
Hired to investigate a robbery, Bailey has one baffling lead: the theft was perfectly timed - almost like a wartime commando raid.
118	9	"The Missing Daddy Caper"	Michael O'Herlihy	Story by : Don C. Richman; Teleplay by : Laszlo Gorog	November 17, 1961
New father, Chet Willis, is happy about the state of his life until his sordid past begins to catch up with him.
119	10	"The Turning Point"	Jeffrey Hayden	Leonard Lee	November 24, 1961
An army buddy of Stu's asks him to be responsible for delinquent Speed Minton. Stu and his friends make progress straightening out the troubled youth but his ex-con brother Nate shows up and tries to draw him back into a criminal life.
120	11	"The Deadly Solo"	Leslie Goodwins	Robert C. Dennis	December 1, 1961
A popular musician Gandy Waters is believed to be the target when a member of his band is murdered. Jeff goes on the road to protect Gandy plus find the killer. He stumbles onto a case of blackmail and a very unhappy wife.
121	12	"Reserved for Mr. Bailey"	Montgomery Pittman	Story by : Charles Sinclair & William Finger; Teleplay by : Montgomery Pittman	December 8, 1961
Stuart Bailey is alone in a ghost town where he is plagued by a ghostly voice that promises him a terrible death. He is the only person on-screen for the entire episode. Note: Bill Finger, one of the three co-writers of the episode, was a joint creator, with Bob Kane, of Batman, whose adventures were the subject of the lampoon action-comedy which premiered almost four years later. Kathleen Crowley is the voice of Melody who is never seen. Likewise, Robert Douglas is the voice of Walter Van Nuys.
122	13	"The Navy Caper"	Robert Sparr	Richard Newhafer	December 15, 1961
Jeff is asked by old naval buddy Captain Ivers to do undercover work at a nearby military base. He brings in Suzanne, Roscoe and Kookie as a yeoman to help protect a top secret computer project. Kookie helps out a lovelorn Harold.
123	14	"Bullets for Santa"	George Waggner	James O'Hanlon	December 22, 1961
Pauline Grant (Marilyn Maxwell) was the intended target of a sniper attack while she was riding in a holiday parade. Instead of her, it looks as if the sniper killed "Santa", with Roscoe (Louis Quinn ) as an eye witness. The assassin later targets her as she appears in the Tournament of Roses parade. Spencer investigates, and finds the incidents were fakes, set up by her manager Artie Henneghan (Gerald Mohr), just as she is about to renew her studio contract. Yvonne Craig appears as Pauline's daughter Kristan Royal.
124	15	"The Chrome Coffin"	Robert Douglas	Frederic Brady	December 29, 1961
Stu is hired by Montaigne, uncle and guardian to Drake, a wealthy youngster interested in drag racing. Threats have been made against Drake's life unless $100,000 is paid. Stu uses JR and Kookie's car expertise in solving the case. Max Baer Jr. guest stars as Billy Blackston; Charles Robinson as Drake Evans
125	16	"The Down Under Caper"	Michael O'Herlihy	Roger Smith	January 5, 1962
Jeff travels to Sydney, Australia to file papers on a case, and finds himself caught up in a range war over land claims. Shot in Burbank, but with Australians Michael Pate and Victoria Shaw in the cast. Shaw was at the time the wife of episode writer and 77SS leading man Roger Smith.
126	17	"Mr. Bailey's Honeymoon"	Jeffrey Hayden	Roger Smith & Montgomery Pittman	January 12, 1962
Stu finds himself in Boler, Oklahoma, with no memory of how he got there, and no memory of who he is. For some reason, Stu had no identifying credentials on himself.
127	18	"Penthouse on Skid Row"	George Waggner	Warren Douglas	January 19, 1962
Stu investigates victimization of old people. Cuddles McGee is played by Mae Questel, the original cartoon voices of Betty Boop and Popeye's girlfriend Olive Oyl
128	19	"The Diplomatic Caper"	Sidney Salkow	Catherine Kuttner	January 26, 1962
Dr. Feld is casting the deciding vote at a European conference. Friend Stu is called in to protect his daughter Michelle from consequences and Kookie helps out. But her undercover identity is threatened by Ross who has misguided ideals.
129	20	"The Bridal Trail Caper"	Gene Reynolds	John K. Butler & Budd Lesser	February 2, 1962
Newlywed Kathy (Dyan Cannon) is stalked and harassed by her old boyfriend (and ex-rodeo champ) Monte Robbins (Don Wilbanks). During a struggle, Monte is shot and believed killed. Jeff and J.R. are hired to protect Kathy and to solve the murder case. When she takes them to recover the body, it's gone, leading them to believe Monte is still alive. She later receives a telephone call from a man claiming to be the killer, and to have moved the body. Frank Sully (Don "Red" Barry) is a blackmailer who claims to know who the real killer is. Dick Arnador (Jack Cassidy) claims to have the gun.
130	21	"Brass Ring Caper"	Paton Price	Robert C. Dennis	February 9, 1962
Hitchhiker Danny Belmont (Robert Ivers) is framed by Brad Kalem (Simon Scott) who had given him a ride, for the murder of Arlene Glascoe (Marjorie Bennett), wife of strip-club owner Walter Glascoe (Milton Frome). Kookie had befriended Danny, and now works to clear his name. Dolores Carlysle (Joan Tabor) Tina (Zeme North), Lt. Roy Gilmore (Byron Keith), Bobbie the photographer (Susan Hart), Vernon (John Zaremba)
131	22	"The Bel Air Hermit"	George Waggner	Mae Malotte	February 16, 1962
Stu is called upon to investigate why Laurie Cameron is wastingly speculating the family inheritance. He finds that whoever is advising her, however, is an expert, as the stocks soar. However, it is also learned why the Bel Air Hermit is such: he is trying to hide from an organized crime mob.
132	23	"The Parallel Caper"	Leslie H. Martinson	Richard Newhafer	February 23, 1962
Nefarious doings at the San Pedro docks. John Gabriel appears as Dennis Winston
133	24	"Twice Dead"	Richard Bartlett	Lee Loeb	March 2, 1962
Tom Lansing (Karl Swenson) is paroled from prison after serving time for the murder of his wife Connie (Margaret Hayes). He hires Stu to assist him to reconnect with his daughter Jean (Sharon Hugueny) who is not interested in connecting with Tom. Stu uncovers evidence that Connie is alive. As Tom and Jean try to connect with each other, Connie is found dead.
134	25	"Jennifer"	Marc Lawrence	Robert C. Dennis	March 9, 1962
Both the father and husband of Jennifer Grey (Claire Griswold) are recently deceased, and she now resides in France. Jeff Spencer is dispatched to France to check on her well-being.
135	26	"Baker Street Caper"	Robert Douglas	Brevarde & Leonard Lee	March 16, 1962
Stu, accompanied by Roscoe, just wrapped up a case in England and is relaxing. But a major heist gets their attention and the London police ask for their expertise. It also gives Roscoe a chance to put his Sherlock Holmes knowledge to use. Brookfield (Maurice Dallimore), Tom Riordan (Walter Burke), Inspector MacGregor (Tudor Owen (actor)), Steve Stevens (Richard Peel), Mr. Craythrope (Lester Matthews), Jackson (Richard Lupino), Newton (George Pelling), Albert (Gilchrist Stuart), Insp. Eric Sommers (Andrew Duggan)
136	27	"The Long Shot Caper"	Charles R. Rondeau	Whitman Chambers	March 23, 1962
Roscoe is caught in the middle of a mafia hit. James Best and Hope Summers guest star. Christine Nelson, real-life wife of Louis Quinn (Roscoe), appears as his girlfriend in this episode.
137	28	"Violence for Your Furs"	Al Rafkin	Story by : Gloria Elmore; Teleplay by : A. I. Bezzerides and Gloria Elmore	March 30, 1962
Roscoe investigates a truck hijacking. Philip Carey and Frank Ferguson guest star.
138	29	"The Pet Shop Caper"	George Waggner	George Waggner	April 6, 1962
Stu Bailey re-opens a six-year-old robbery case when the leading suspect re-enters the country disguised as his own lookalike.
139	30	"The Steerer"	Francis Lederer	Robert C. Dennis	April 13, 1962
A crooked poker game and murder. Tom Gilson as Harmie Sinclair, Pamela Austin as Betsy Howard
140	31	"Ghost of a Memory"	Charles R. Rondeau	Paul Schneider	April 20, 1962
Kathie Browne as Barbara Main, who keeps getting telephone calls from someone claiming to be her deceased movie star husband Johnny. Jeff Spencer and colleagues are brought in to investigate. Chick Chandler as talent manager Eddie Carlisle. Peter Leeds appears as Phil Kneighler.
141	32	"The Disappearance"	Sidney Salkow	Story by : Frederic Brady; Teleplay by : Lawrence Kimble	April 27, 1962
Kidnapping of an national leader for $1,000,000 in ransom
142	33	"The Lovely American"	Michael O'Herlihy	Story by : Richard DeRoy and William P. D'Angelo; Teleplay by : Richard DeRoy	May 4, 1962
Jeff flies to Italy with a financial bequest to the residents. Police officer Lorenzo Ferrante (Nico Minardos) takes nefarious steps to get his hands on the money.
143	34	"The Gemmologist Caper"	Robert Sparr	Story by : Lawrence Kimble and Fred Roy Schiller; Teleplay by : Lawrence Kimble	May 11, 1962
The sleuths get a lesson in intrigue from a notorious international jewel thief who snatches a fortune in gems as they blithely look on.
144	35	"Flight from Escondido"	Robert Douglas	Paul Savage	May 18, 1962
En-route to Los Angeles, Jeff Spencer is aboard a flight hijacked by Latin American revolutionaries. Guest stars: Joe De Santis (General Gutierrez), Rico Alaniz (Colonel Luna), Philip Carey (Captain Glen Shore), William Schallert (Steve Alexander), Philip Carey (airline pilot Captain Glen Shore)
145	36	"Dress Rehearsal"	Jeffrey Hayden	Brevarde & Leonard Lee	May 25, 1962
Kookie's is now an investigative partner of 77 Sunnet Strip. His first case involves a kidnapped dog. The Fraser family: Diane Jergens (Debbie Fraser), Natalie Schafer (Ellie Fraser), Julie Van Zandt (Kitty Fraser), Robert Christopher (Kirk Fraser) Richard Carlyle (Wayne Fraser) The Lawrence family: Lisabeth Hush (Audrey Lawrence), Douglas Henderson (Dr. Robert Lawrence) Others: Majel Barrett (Ilsa Grosch), John Astin (Martin Grosch), Hanley Stafford (Adm. Thomas Kyle)
146	37	"Framework for a Badge"	George Waggner	Ken Pettus	June 1, 1962
A killers ability to keep one step ahead of lieutenant Gilmore is having its effect on the policeman's reputation, until Spencer steps in. Guest stars: Irene Hervey (Ellen Gilmore), Byron Keith (Lt. Roy Gilmore), Richard Devon (Norm Leach), Tom Drake (Owen Harris), Gregg Palmer (Murph Brady), Harry Holcombe (Captain Reynolds), Allison Daniell (Sheri Morgan)
147	38	"Pattern for a Bomb"	Sidney Salkow	Lawrence Kimble	June 8, 1962
Jeff Spencer and Kookie investigate a series of bombings carried out to extort money from merchants. Joan Marshall, Larry Ward appear as Vicky and Paul Landers. Frank de Kova as Jack Bent the mastermind behind the crimes.
148	39	"Upbeat"	Montgomery Pittman	Montgomery & Maurita Pittman	June 15, 1962
J.R. is lured into a trap, designed by an old nemesis to eventually bring down Stu. A sequel to season 1's "Downbeat", with John Van Dreelen and Dorothy Provine reprising their roles from that episode. Also on hand is the character of Cal Calhoun (played by Andrew Duggan) from the two-years cancelled Bourbon Street Beat; Cal has given up P.I. work and returned to the New Orleans police force.
149	40	"Nightmare"	Robert Douglas	Robert C. Dennis	June 22, 1962
Spencer is retained by Mark Wade (Peter Breck), an artist believes his dreams of murder with become reality. Anna-Lisa appears as Dr. Abby Ryner
150	41	"The Gang's All Here"	James Komack	James Komack	June 29, 1962
Timmy Ellison (Peter Brown), the son of a police officer Lt. Ellison (Dick Foran), has fallen in with a criminal gang of pool sharks headed by Kid Pepper (Sammy Davis Jr.). Kookie is sent undercover to infiltrate the gang and rescue Timmy, who would much rather be a part of the gang. Roy Glenn appears as Kid Pepper's father Big John Pepper.

=== Season 5: 1962–63 ===
No. overall	No. in season	Title	Directed by	Written by	Original release date
151	1	"The Reluctant Spy"	Paul Landres	Robert C. Dennis	October 12, 1962
Stuart Bailey (Efrerm Zimbalist) travels to France with Lucy Norton (Randy Stuart) to investigate the hit and run death of her husband Scott, who was also Bailey's best friend. Jay Novello appears as Rudolf Weisner who offers to help. Stu is given a key found in the deceased's pocket, which is the key to the apartment of Fereka Andrassy (Chana Eden), believed to be Norton's mistress. It is revealed that Norton was helping Sasha Baranov (Christopher Dark) and Andrassy defect to America.
152	2	"Leap, My Lovely"	Irving J. Moore	Lawrence Kimble	October 19, 1962
Actress Nita Maran (Diane McBain) is hypnotized by blackmailing actor Ferini (Robert Ellenstein)
153	3	"Terror in a Small Town"	Richard C. Sarafian	Paul Savage	October 26, 1962
A prank on J.R., pulled off by Kookie and Jeff, goes awry. Kookie is later in a small town, accused of rape. Only J.R can save him, but J.R. thinks it's just another one of Kookie's pranks.
154	4	"The Raiders"	Robert Sparr	Story by : Lawrence Kimble and Fred Roy Schiller; Teleplay by : Lawrence Kimble	November 2, 1962
Stu Bailey goes undercover to help a small town chief of police nail the kingpin of a gambling syndicate. Dutch Howard (Jacques Aubuchon), Fran Duncan (Virginia Gregg), Stacey Duncan (Kathie Browne), Bert Lovell (Lee Bowman), Janet Lovell (Frances Helm), Thayer (John Archer), Sergeant Mays (Kem Dibbs), Dr. Austin (Henry Hunter)
155	5	"The Floating Man"	Irving J. Moore	Robert C. Dennis	November 9, 1962
Gideon Harte (Henry Daniell) demonstrates self-levitation, which Jeff Spencer (Roger Smith) is certain is nothing but a platform magic trick. After Judge Mellon (Edmon Ryan) is murdered, a witness says she saw a man float through the air from one building to another, and Harte confesses to the murder. Police Lt. Roy Gilmore (Byron Keith) is skeptical of the confession. When Spencer discovers Judge Mellon's stash of bribery, housekeeper Mrs. Elster (Penny Santon) attempts to kill Spencer to get the money.
156	6	"The Catspaw Caper"	Paul Landres	John K. Butler & Lou Huston	November 16, 1962
After Anna Kalmar (Valerie Varda) escapes Communist Hungary, she hires Stuart Bailey to help her find her mother Maria Kalmer (Iphigenie Castiglioni) who already fled Hungary and is hiding under an assumed identity. Bailey discovers that both he and Anna are being followed by Communists who want to hunt down her mother. David White and Theo Marcuse guest star.
157	7	"Wolf! Cried the Blonde"	Robert Douglas	Sonya Roberts	November 23, 1962
Celebrity Dagne Stuart (Jo Morrow) is hounded by her former husband Claude (Opie) Price (Peter Breck) who wants money to get out of her life. Jeff Spencer (Roger Smith) is hired to protect her. A murder is committed, and it falls to Jeff to solve it.
158	8	"The Dark Wood"	Richard C. Sarafian	Story by : A. I. Bezzerides; Teleplay by : A. I. Bezzerides and Lawrence Kimble	November 30, 1962
Stuart Bailey learns his friend Randy Phelps has died from what is officially ruled by Sheriff Joe Goodson (House Peters Jr.) as an accidentally self-inflicted gun shot wound. His widow Willa (Diane Brewster) has sold her property and wants to start a new life elsewhere. Daughter Annette "Netsie" Phelps (Susan Gordon) believes her father was murdered. Bailey suspects local trouble maker Ben Miles (Walter Sande) of having been involved in the death of Phelps.
159	9	"Shadow on Your Shoulder"	Leslie H. Martinson	Lawrence Kimble	December 7, 1962
Cloris Leachman appears as Eve Winters, and Dayton Lummis as Guy Winters
160	10	"Adventure in San Dede"	Leslie H. Martinson	Montgomery Pittman	December 14, 1962
Jeff Spencer (Roger Smith) and J.R. Hale (Robert Logan Jr.) make an important delivery in the fictional country of San Dede. J.R. handcuffs himself to the briefcase that contains their delivery, but accidentally leaves the briefcase key back in Los Angeles. Joe De Santis appears as Hidalgo; Mario Alcalde as Jose Barbosa
161	11	"The Odds on Odette"	Charles R. Rondeau	Robert C. Dennis	December 21, 1962
Jeff is hired by astrologer "Odette" Bayard Parmenter (James Millhollin) to investigate threats. His assistant Mary O'Neil (Merry Anders) is the recorded telephone voice of Odette. Someone later tries to run her down with an automobile registered to Silas Hay (Henry Daniell), who never drives his own car, but loans it out to his nephew Andy Lamont (Eddie Fontaine). Lt. Roy Gilmore (Byron Keith) announces Hay fell downstairs and died, leaving $100,000 to astrologer Odette, and specifies Mary O'Neil is the real Odette. Jeff put the pieces together to prove the threats were all part of a larger scheme crafted by O'Neill to inherit the fortune.
162	12	"The Snow Job Caper"	Sidney Salkow	John O'Dea & Sidney Salkow	December 28, 1962
Jeff and an insurance adjuster try to find a lost shipment. Much to the exasperation of Steve Moran (Bill Williams), his wife Katie (Ruta Lee) and her boyfriend Tony Dante (Fabrizio Mioni) have already absconded with the money. Meanwhile, her old jilted boyfriend Chuck Lynch (Adam Williams) threatens her unless she turns the stash over to him.
163	13	"Falling Stars"	Paul Landres	James & George O'Hanlon	January 4, 1963
Paul Winchell guest stars as television comedian Skeets Riley, who hires Stu Bailey to find out who is making threats on his life. It appears Riley may be faking everything for publicity, causing Bailey to drop him as a client. Riley is hospitalized after being shot, and Bailey resumes his investigation. Byron Keith as police Lt. Roy Gilmore. Linda Watkins as the widow Thelma King.
164	14	"The Tarnished Idol"	Paul Landres	Story by : Robert Jacks; Teleplay by : Robert C. Dennis	January 11, 1963
Suzanne goes under cover to catch swindlers. Guest stars: Joyce Meadows, Alan Hale Jr., Van Williams
165	15	"Scream Softly, Dear"	Jeffrey Hayden	Donn Mullally	January 18, 1963
Auto mechanic Charles Bell (Peter Marshall) comes under scrutiny when the wife of Hank Stone (Rhodes Reason) borrows a car from Beth Collins (Joan Taylor) . The car goes over a cliff, killing the driver. Beth suspects her husband Warren (Simon Scott), who is having an affair with Laura Holt (Elinor Donahue), might be the killer. Kookie investigates and finds Charles Bell is also a blackmailer who targets women. Warren believes the killer is Beth's alleged boyfriend . Hank, on the other hand, believes Beth is the murderer.
166	16	"Terror in Silence"	Robert Sparr	Robert C. Dennis	January 25, 1963
Stuart Bailey comes to the aid of a hearing-impaired librarian. Strother Martin appears as Charles Sloane
167	17	"Crash Out!"	Paul Landres	Jerry Davis	February 1, 1963
Undercover and on the trail of a missing $500,000, Roscoe and Jeff Spencer share a cell with suspect Eddie Marco (Michael Parks)
168	18	"The Night Was Six Years Long"	George Waggner	Lawrence Kimble	February 8, 1963
The agency's old secretary Janie Maynor Benton (Myrna Fahey) shows up for work, unaware that she's not worked there for six years. She tells them she murdered a man in self defense the night before. While everyone is confused about her appearance, Stu wonders who has been paying her bills for the previous six years. Her apartment building manager Mr. Armstrong (George Kennedy) claims not to know her, yet it becomes clear that he does. Chris Benton (Philip Carey) claims to be her husband and the father of her children.
169	19	"Six Feet Under"	Paul Landres	Lawrence Kimble	February 15, 1963
Mob boss Marco Deederman (Malachi Throne) is believed to have been killed during a robbery. Acting as an inspector for a jewel company, Jeff Spencer visits the cemetery where Deederman is supposedly buried, and introduces himself to a woman claiming to be Deederman's daughter Nancy (Karen Sharpe). After Kookie informs Jeff of the robbery of a wholesale jewelry company, Jeff begins to believe the funeral was a ruse to cover up that Deederman is still alive.
170	20	"Escape to Freedom"	George Waggner	Paul Savage	February 22, 1963
Stu is in East Berlin to free his old acquaintance Dr. Marie Harben (Ursula Thiess), a scientist who has been told her son is being held hostage by political forces. Werner Klemperer guest stars as Major Schtiekel
171	21	"Dial 'S' for Spencer"	Robert Sparr	James & George O'Hanlon	March 1, 1963
Mike Keene (Tom Drake) is supposedly due for an inheritance. His sister Sandra Keene (Ellen Burstyn) worries that someone will prevent him from getting the money, and asks Jeff Spencer for help. Keene says Sandra is his wife, not his sister. The police say Keene is already dead and in a morgue.
172	22	"Nine to Five"	Murray Golden	Stanley Niss	March 8, 1963
Bailey's old friend Dick Lynwood (Richard Long) has to resolve issues with both his business and his wife Lu-Ann Lynwood (Diane McBain)
173	23	"Stranger from the Sea"	George Waggner	John K. Butler & Lou Huston	March 15, 1963
Kookie gets involved when his Japanese friend Ito Nakayama (Mako) searches for his missing uncle. Beulah Quo as Ito's mother.
174	24	"The Man Who Wasn't There"	Paul Landres	Robert C. Dennis	March 22, 1963
Jeff is hired by Pete Rix (Don Dubbins) who claims that his wife Nona (Grace Raynor) and Dr. Woodrow (Byron Kane) put him under psychiatric care when he said he saw his old war buddy Harry Tiburon (Forrest Compton), in spite of Tiburon having been executed by an enemy firing squad during the Korean War. Tiburon's uncle Lawrence (Hardie Albright), as well as eyewitnesses to the execution, all confirm that Harry Tiburon is dead. Spencer tells Nona that it would have been more practical for the Koreans to have turned Harry over to the Chinese to be reprogrammed as a Conmmunist sleeper agent.
175	25	"Flight 307"	Charles R. Rondeau	Story by : Boris Ingster; Teleplay by : Boris Ingster & Ardel Wray	March 29, 1963
Stu's flight to Hawaii is delayed by assorted issues. Movie star Barbara Adams (Gena Rowlands) believes she's engaged to Larry Knight (Tony Young), only to find out he already has a wife (Madlyn Rhue). Before she's taken to the hospital by ambulance, she pours out her insecurities to grounded pilot Charles 'Brick' Garrett (Philip Carey). Max Eames (Jack Warden) is her agent. Thief Banks Miller (William Phipps) is fleeing to Mexico with his latest booty grab. Fellow con artist Willie Malach (Lewis Charles) demands hush money, but his body is later found in the men's restroom. Miller uses Barbara Adams as a hostage, until airport honcho Henry Cook (Bill Williams) helps him escape. During he attempted escape, Stu Bailey recognizes him and stops the escape. Mark Dempsey as 'Tuck' Turner, Russ Conway as Dutch Schroeder, Dan Tobin as Paul DeWitt, Tommy Farrell as Lindstrom
176	26	"Target Island"	George Waggner	Gloria Elmore	April 5, 1963
J.R. Hale (Robert Logan Jr.) helps his date Taffy Gaylor (Jenny Maxwell) search for her brother Barney (Gordon Wescourt) who is considered a deserter by the military. He was last seen with his girlfriend Marie (Pamela Duncan). Jeff Spencer rescues Barney on an island used by the Navy for target practice.
177	27	"Reunion at Balboa"	Leslie H. Martinson	Don Tait	April 12, 1963
J.R. and Kookie are hired to keep an eye on Marilyn Sterling (Pamela Austin) while she's on Balboa Island with her friend Agnes Hoyt (Rachel Ames). In spite of their efforts, Toby McGill (Anthony D. Call) and his friend steal Marylin's car, running over her in the process. John Dehner appears as Toby's father Robert McGill, who lies to the police and says Toby was with him when the incident happened.
178	28	"Walk Among Tigers"	Robert Sparr	Paul Savage	April 19, 1963
Stu uncovers a trap, when he searches a train crash for a client's belongings. Warren Stevens as Smits, Kaye Elhardt as Martha Emerson, Allan Jones as Endicott Fellows.
179	29	"The Left Field Caper"	George Waggner	Joel Rogosin	April 26, 1963
Little League coach J.R. calls Jeff in for help; one of his team members has an ex-con father who is being targeted for death by a former criminal associate. Though Roger Smith would remain in the cast until the end of the season, this is the final episode to focus on a Jeff Spencer caper. With Ronnie Dapo, Diane Ladd, Kathleen Freeman, Grace Lee Whitney and Bo Belinsky (as himself).
180	30	"The Heartbeat Caper"	Paul Landres	Jason Wingreen	May 3, 1963
Professor Charles B. Alderson (Andrew Duggan) has engaged Stu as a guest lecturer, during which student/football hero George Remsen (Sandy McPeak) is killed. Student Paul Atwell (Carl Reindel) becomes the main suspect after he proved in a classroom demonstration that he can beat a lie detector test. Bailey solves the murder while proving how a lie detector can return a false reading.
181	31	"To Catch a Mink"	Robert M. Leeds	Lawrence Kimble	May 10, 1963
Pop Bateman (Robert Armstrong) invites the detectives and their associates to a charity auction being run by Jacqueline Duncan (Linda Marshall). While there, Stu Bailey reconnects with his old girlfriend Connie Beck (Dianne Foster) who plans to steal the charity proceeds. J.R. Hale (Robert Logan Jr.) is in charge of parking cars, and tries to alert the detectives that he's been instructed to park a couple of the cars in a position to make a fast getaway. Both Stu and Jeff Spencer brush off J. R.'s warning.
182	32	"Lady in the Sun"	Robert Sparr	Teleplay by : Dean Riesner; From a Story by : Thomas Ahearn & Morton Grant	May 17, 1963
Stu pursues a dangerous female thief. With Karen Sharpe (Paula Michaels), Yvonne Craig (Willie Miller) and Bernie Kopell (Andy Lewin).
183	33	"Our Man in Switzerland"	Richard C. Sarafian	Story by : Robert Musel; Teleplay by : Robert Hamner	May 24, 1963
When a million dollars in securities are stolen from the agency's custody, Stu embarks on a trip to Switzerland to chase down the money and the culprits. With Kurt Kreuger as Paul Van Dehn, and Maria Machado as Adrianne Monet.
184	34	"Your Fortune for a Penny"	Robert Sparr	Robert C. Dennis	May 31, 1963
Stu tries to solve a very cold case, and gets mixed up with the very hot blonde Kristine Seaver (Susan Oliver) and Bill Quinn as her father Eugene Seaver. Olan Soule as the station agent.
185	35	"The Checkmate Caper"	George Waggner	Robert J. Shaw	June 7, 1963
Stu is hired by the heir to a criminal family's fortune. With William Windom and Nancy Kulp. Final episode for Jeff, Roscoe, Suzanne, J.R., and Lt. Gilmore.
186	36	"Never to Have Loved"	William Conrad	Story by : Robert J. Shaw; Teleplay by : Harold Jack Bloom	June 14, 1963
Stu and Kookie are hired to protect actress Margrit Strom (Patricia Rainier) from her husband Toller Vengrin (Albert Paulsen). The marriage was bigamous, as she did not divorce her first husband. Margrit's maid Greta Haggman (Virginia Christine ) was hired by the husband after they were married. Her husband is found shot to death by Margrit's gun, which he gave to her. Final episode for Edward Brynes as Kookie. Jack Webb and William Conrad take over behind the scenes beginning with this episode. Guest star: Robert Knapp

=== Season 6: 1963–64 ===
This season was approached in a film noir style, and it was essentially a different show, with no connection to the original series. Season 6 featured a private investigator named Stuart Bailey who was still played by Efrem Zimbalist, but he had a different personality and background. Bailey's office was located in a different building than before, although the show name was still 77 Sunset Strip. The theme music was changed as well. The show was canceled midway through the 1963/64 season; summer repeats shown during the summer of 1964 were all from earlier seasons.

No. overall	No. in season	Title	Directed by	Written by	Original release date
187	1	"5: Part 1"	William Conrad	Teleplay by : Harry Essex	September 20, 1963
Stuart Bailey, now operating a one-man detective agency, is summoned to New York by Vincent Marion. Marion wants Bailey to buy his late younger brother Andy's way to heaven -- by making amends to those who Andy has wronged during a wasted life. Bailey must contend with a hostile New York City police detective and various characters whose motives are unclear. Bailey has $9,000 that Andy Marion left. But Andy's debts likely far outweigh the money. One mystery is Carla Stevens, who is following the detective. As the first part ends, Bailey lies in the basement of an apartment building after having been attacked by a thug.
188	2	"5: Part 2"	William Conrad	Teleplay by : Harry Essex	September 27, 1963
Stuart Bailey recovers from a beating and presses forward with his case, tracking down people who knew the late Andy Marion and attempt to make right the pain Andy had caused. Bailey encounters a series of eccentric characters who hold pieces of the puzzle. He also tracks down Carla Stevens, Andy's former girlfriend. Meanwhile, Andy's wife of one week turns up dead and New York City Lt. Butter looks to Bailey as the prime suspect. Bailey turns up a photograph of a large key and has a duplicate made. As the episode ends, Bailey has been fired by Victor Marion, the dead man's brother.The detective knows he has seen the lock the key must open -- and figures he must find it fast.
189	3	"5: Part 3"	William Conrad	Teleplay by : Harry Essex	October 4, 1963
As Stuart Bailey digs deeper into the life the late Andy Marion, he discovers the dead man was dealing in art treasurers stolen by the Nazis in World War II. Vincent Marion, the dead man's brother, agrees to provide additional funds for Bailey to follow a lead to Italy. But Bailey doesn't know that Vincent Marion, an art dealer, is playing a deadly double cross.
190	4	"5: Part 4"	William Conrad	Teleplay by : Harry Essex	October 11, 1963
Stuart Bailey crisscrosses Europe trying to solve the mystery of art objects stolen by the Nazis. The detective discovers the codename of Ajax. But other leads turn out to be literal dead ends. Bailey is also under observation by the U.S. Army unit charged with recovering priceless artworks stolen by the Nazis during World War II. Bailey gets a lead that calls for him to fly to Israel. But before he can make a flight to Israel, he's about to be attacked by thugs in Paris.
191	5	"5: The Conclusion"	William Conrad	Teleplay by : Harry Essex	October 18, 1963
Stuart Bailey fights off attackers in Paris then managers to check out of his hotel and catch a flight to Tel Aviv. Once there, he encounters a World War II veteran who provides valuable knowledge about how a half-billion dollars in artworks stolen by the Nazis were, in turn, stolen again. Vincent Marion, who originally hired Bailey, was behind the theft. He had his brother Andy killed after the younger Marion had tried to go into business for himself. After Marion commits suicide, Bailey moves to solve the marathon case.
192	6	"White Lie"	Paul Nickell	Boris Ingster & Ardel Wray	October 25, 1963
Stu Bailey investigates the title for a piece of land in Oklahoma that could yield a fortune in oil. But the owner is afraid to reveal that she has Negro blood, a revelation that would ruin her standing in the White world.
193	7	"88 Bars"	Abner Biberman	Tony Barrett	November 1, 1963
Stu Bailey is hired by one of the richest women in the world to investigate a series of attempts on the life of her brother. The highlights of Bailey's investigation include a quick trip to Las Vegas and discovering an intruder breaking into his office. The private investigator discovers the brother is hiding something -- something that could mean the end of Bailey.
194	8	"Don't Wait for Me"	Abner Biberman	Robert C. Dennis	November 8, 1963
Stu Bailey is hired by wealthy Mrs. Patterson to find out who shot her daughter Sharon in the park. She suspects the boy from the poor side of town and pays Stu when Marco is arrested. He proves what she thinks happened is not the truth.
195	9	"By His Own Verdict"	Lawrence Dobkin	Franklin Barton	November 15, 1963
Bailey is hired to investigate an accused murderer, who has already admitted to committing the crime. Joseph Cotten (Arnold Buhler), Nick Adams (Max Dent), Barbara Bain (Rachel Dent)
196	10	"Deposit with Caution"	Byron Paul	Robert Leslie Bellem	November 29, 1963
A police officer is framed for taking a payoff.
197	11	"The Toy Jungle"	Lawrence Dobkin	Story by : Tony Barrett; Teleplay by : Tony Barrett & Louis Vittes	December 6, 1963
An investigation of a wife's double-life leads to a drug ring. Joan Staley debuts as Hannah in this episode. Up to this point in the season, Hannah had been a frequently referenced but unseen, unheard offstage character.
198	12	"The Fumble"	Lawrence Dobkin	Tony Barrett	December 13, 1963
A drunk, that Stu is supposed to keep an eye on, is framed for murder.
199	13	"Bonus Baby"	Leo Penn	Story by : Edwin Blum; Teleplay by : Robert Leslie Bellem	December 20, 1963
Stu works on a paternity case that involves a son abandoned by his father years before.
200	14	"Paper Chase"	Byron Paul	Story by : Roland Wolpert; Teleplay by : Robert Leslie Bellem & Roland Wolpert	December 27, 1963
Stu confronts murder and blackmail when he is hired by a paper company. Cast: Med Flory (Paul Keddy), Lisa Gaye (Laura Keddy), Elena Verdugo (Karen Keddy), Harlan Warde (Lawrence Keddy), David White (Jasper Clinton), Jean Willes (Francie Vollmer)
201	15	"Lovers' Lane"	Lawrence Dobkin	Boris Ingster & Ardel Wray	January 3, 1964 (Note: Originally scheduled for November 22, 1963, but delayed due to the assassination of John F. Kennedy)
A young man is on Death Row, convicted of rape and murder. Stu is hired to prove his innocence. Bruce Dern (Ralph Wheeler), Kenneth MacDonald (Chief of Police), Charles McGraw (Lt. Jack Starkey), Preston Foster (Boss Gates), Hampton Fancher (Chuck Gates Jr.), Beverly Washburn (Dorrie Lang), Than Wyenn (John Lang), Yvonne Craig (Tina Nichols), Tom Holland (Al Killian), Bill Quinn (Petey Peterson), James Seay (Tom Nolan), Paula Winslowe (Miss Garner)
202	16	"Alimony League"	Lawrence Dobkin	Robert Leslie Bellem	January 10, 1964
Stu gets involved in alimony re-negotiations. Diana Millay (Francie O'Hara), Joan Staley (Hannah), Ben Wright (John Folsom), Betty Lou Gerson (Nelly Folsom), Roxane Berard (Denise Kenzie), Julie Adams (Anne Kenzie), Kathie Browne (Betty Kenzie), Natalie Trundy (Charlotte Kenzie), Lloyd Corrigan (Jerry Kenzie), Art Koulias (The Clerk)
203	17	"Not Such a Simple Knot"	Lawrence Dobkin	Tony Barrett	January 17, 1964
Stu babysits for a math genius in Las Vegas; the boy may be able to break the casino. Pat Cardi (Skip Barnes), Kaye Elhardt (Paula Barnes), Ruta Lee (Vicki), Joan Staley (Hannah), Rhys Williams (Uncle Molnar), Roy Roberts (Driscoll), Sheldon Allman (Nick Mester), January Jones (Doreen), Edgar Barrier (Arthur LaMond), Joan Swift (Laurette), Dan Tobin (Les Cook)
204	18	"The Target"	Lawrence Dobkin	Tony Barrett	January 24, 1964
The author of a true crime book finds himself the target of an assassin. Actor-producer Jack Webb has an uncredited cameo as a bystander. Keith Andes (Frank Cassel), Jeanne Cooper (Gina Cassel), Joan Staley (Hannah), Lyle Talbot (Tatum), Les Tremayne (Warden), Forrest Lewis (Zimmy), Shirley Mitchell (Landlady), Suzi Carnell (Sharon Carnovan), Ray Montgomery (Eddie Stone), Hal Baylor (Lenny Britt), Lawrence Dobkin (Landers), Jimmy Lydon (Charlie), Tony Barrett (Carnovan), William Conrad (Al Maestrian)
205	19	"Dead as in 'Dude'"	Abner Biberman	Louis Vittes	January 31, 1964
Stu investigates a suicide at a dude ranch, when the widow rejects the cause of death. Diane Brewster (Gloria Townsend), Jo Morrow (Ventura Brown), Robert Colbert (McHenry), Joan Staley (Hannah), William Bramley (Grover Bridges), John Hudson (Mark Rawlins), Phillip Terry (Peter Fleming), Lester Matthews (Pillsbury), Cathie Merchant (Dolores), Sarah Marshall (Harriet Hillbrook), Reginald Gardiner (Mr. Maudlin)
206	20	"Queen of the Cats"	Lawrence Dobkin	Louis Vittes	February 7, 1964
An heiress from Philadelphia hires Stu to locate her long-lost mother. Virginia Gregg (Helen Johnson), Joan Staley (Hannah), Jena Engstrom (Marian Armstrong), Paula Raymond (Robbie), Parley Baer (Charlie Cornwall), Steve Ihnat (Vince), Dick Wessel (Stan), Irwin Charone (Eddie)
