= Irving Lippman =

American film and television cinematographer

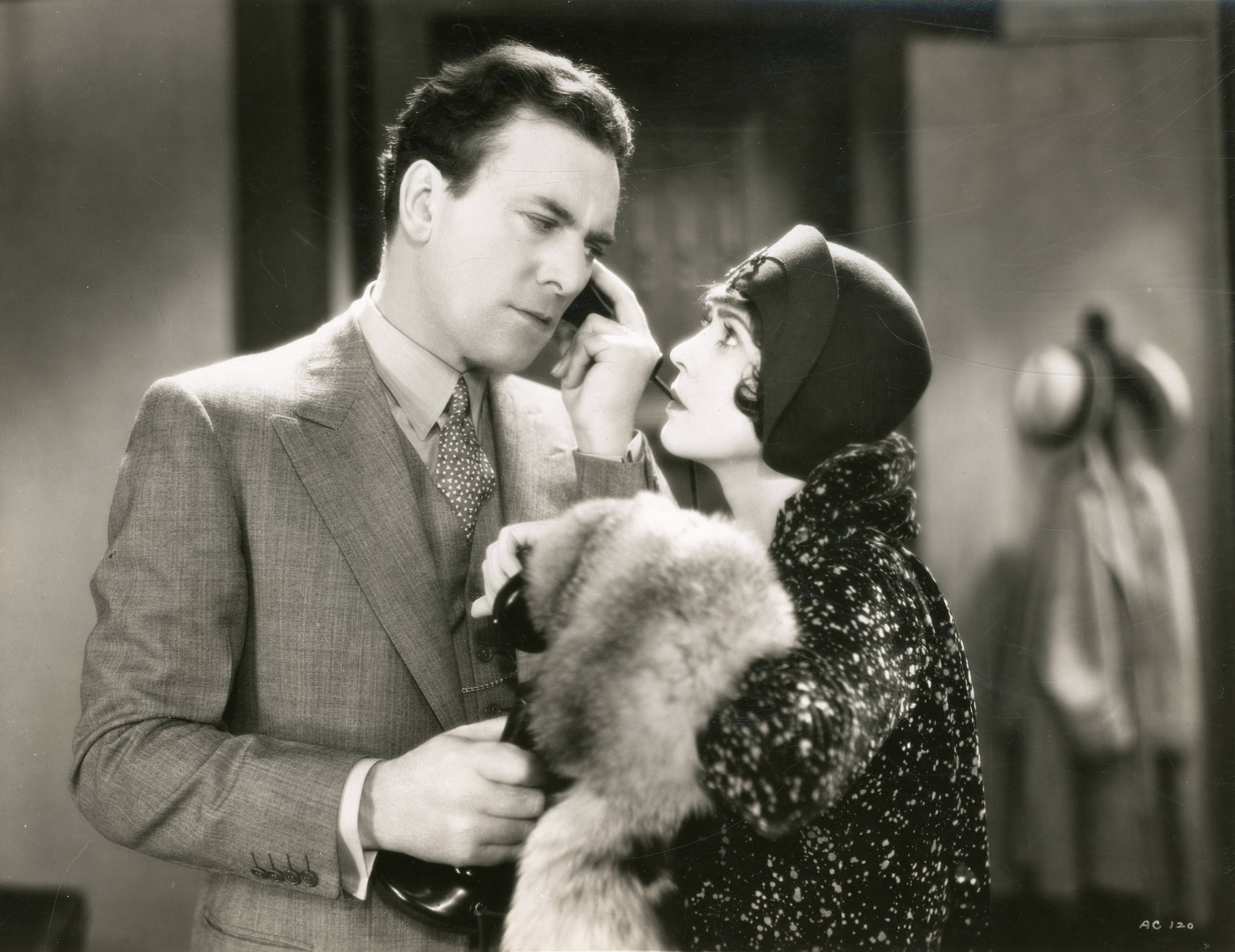
- Lippman still for the lost 1929 film The Argyle Case, starring Thomas Meighan and Lila Lee
- Born: Irving Isadore Lippman; November 8, 1906; Edendale, California, U.S.
- Died: November 15, 2006 (aged 100); Woodland Hills, California, U.S.
- Occupations: Cinematographer and photographer

Irving Isadore Lippman (November 8, 1906 – November 15, 2006) was an American cinematographer and photographer.

Lippman was born in Edendale, California. He began his career in 1922 as an assistant cameraman for a Fatty Arbuckle comedy. His work as a photographer included photographing celebrities.

Lippman worked on films and television programs including Route 66, The Great Sioux Massacre, Here Comes the Brides, Apache Territory, Columbo, The Partridge Family, Death Valley Days, The Monkees, 20 Million Miles to Earth, The Wild Wild West, Tarzan and the Valley of Gold, The Outlaws Is Coming, 77 Sunset Strip, Bridget Loves Bernie, The Three Stooges Go Around the World in a Daze and The Adventures of Rin Tin Tin. His last cinematography credits were for Fantasy Island and The Love Boat.

Lippman died on November 15, 2006 at the Motion Picture & Television Fund cottages in Woodland Hills, California, at the age of 100.
