= The Hired Gun (1957 film) =

1957 film by Ray Nazarro

- Directed by: Ray Nazarro
- Screenplay by: David Lang; Buckley Angell
- Based on: Buckley Angell
- Produced by: Rory Calhoun; Victor Orsatti
- Starring: Rory Calhoun; Anne Francis
- Cinematography: Harold J. Marzorati
- Edited by: Frank Santillo
- Music by: Albert Glasser
- Production company: Rorvic Productions
- Distributed by: Metro-Goldwyn-Mayer
- Release date: September 20, 1957
- Running time: 64 minutes
- Country: United States
- Language: English
- Budget: $323,000
- Box office: $845,000

The Hired Gun is a 1957 American CinemaScope Western film directed by Ray Nazarro and starring Rory Calhoun and Anne Francis.

== Plot ==
In the Old West, Ellen Beldon is about to be hanged in Texas for the cold-blooded murder of her husband. Her uncle’s ranch foreman, Judd Farrow, masquerading as a priest, breaks her out of jail and escorts Ellen to a safe hideout at her uncle’s ranch in New Mexico. Her uncle has enough influence to block extradition of Ellen back to Texas.

Her father-in-law, Mace Beldon, determined to avenge the killing of his son, hires gunman Gil McCord for $5,000 to track down Ellen and bring her back to Texas. Gil hires on as a cowhand and then kidnaps Ellen and they head back to Texas. On the way, Farrow intercepts them and is killed by Gil. The pair also survive an ambush by Indians. Ellen explains to Gil that her husband was murdered by his step-brother, Kell Beldon, who wants to be sole heir to their father's money and land; and, a man named Elby Kirby witnessed the killing. Gil tracks down Kirby and forces him to admit what he knows. Kell confronts Gil and is killed in a shootout. Gil and Ellen ride out of town together.

== Cast ==
- Rory Calhoun as Gil McCord
- Anne Francis as Ellen Beldon
- Vince Edwards as Kell Beldon
- John Litel as Mace Beldon
- Chuck Connors as Judd Farrow
- Robert Burton as Nathan Conroy
- Salvadore Baques as Domingo Ortega
- Guinn Williams as Elby Kirby
- Regis Parton as Cliff Beldon

== Reception ==
According to MGM records the movie earned $395,000 in the US and Canada and $450,000 elsewhere, making a profit to the studio of $169,000.

== See also ==
- List of American films of 1957
