= Rorvic Productions =

American production company

Rorvic Productions was a movie production company formed in 1956 by Rory Calhoun and Victor Orsatti. The name derives from the combination of the founders names, Rory and Victor.

Rorvic Productions produced the television series The Texan, three feature films, and two television films, all starring Calhoun.

The Hired Gun, released in 1957, was the first film produced by Rorvic Productions. Rorvic also produced Domino Kid (1957) and Apache Territory (1958).

== Filmography ==
Year	Title	Medium
1956	Flight to Hong Kong	Featured Film
1957	The Hired Gun	Featured Film
1957	Domino Kid	Featured Film
1958	Apache Territory	Featured Film
1958-1960	The Texan	Television Series
