= Flight to Hong Kong =

1956 film by Joseph M. Newman

- Theatrical release poster
- Directed by: Joseph M. Newman
- Screenplay by: Leo Townsend; George Callahan (as Edward G. O'Callaghan)
- Story by: George Callahan (as Edward G. O'Callaghan); Gustave Field
- Produced by: Joseph M. Newman
- Starring: Rory Calhoun; Barbara Rush; Dolores Donlon
- Cinematography: Ellis W. Carter
- Edited by: William W. Moore; George C. Shrader
- Music by: Albert Glasser
- Production companies: Rorvic Productions; Sabre Production
- Distributed by: United Artists
- Release date: October 8, 1956
- Running time: 89 minutes
- Country: United States
- Language: English

Flight to Hong Kong is a 1956 American crime film noir directed by Joseph M. Newman and starring Rory Calhoun, Barbara Rush, Dolores Donlon. The film was co-produced by Newman's Sabre Productions and was the first of Rory Calhoun's Rorvic Productions. It was the feature film debut of Werner Klemperer.

== Plot ==
Tony Dumont is aboard a plane to the Crown Colony of Hong Kong carrying a shipment of industrial diamonds. It is hijacked by men who flee with the gems, leaving Tony and other passengers, including famed novelist Pamela Vincent, at a remote airstrip. After they are rescued and taken to Hong Kong, Tony does not get to say goodbye because Pamela is mobbed by the press.

Tony returns home to Macau, where he is actually the head of local operations for an international crime syndicate and had plotted the heist. Quisto, Tony's childhood friend and head of the syndicate's Bangkok operations, calls to tell Tony about a freighter hijacked for the syndicate that will need to be unloaded offshore.

Tony takes his girlfriend Jean to a nightclub run by Mama Lin, who raised Tony as an orphan. There that night is Tony's old friend Lobero, who refuses to sell his own smuggling operation in San Francisco to the syndicate. Pamela is among the club's customers that night, so they renew their acquaintance. Syndicate boss Bendesh calls to warn Tony that a rival operation is planning to steal the cargo from the hijacked freighter. Tony and his lieutenants, ambitious Nicco and longtime friend Boris, go to the freighter in a speedboat and supervise the transfer of the stolen cargo onto junks. When other junks with armed thieves arrive to try to intercept, they use their greater speed. maneuverability and hand grenades to prevail.

Jean is angered by Tony abandoning her at the club. Bendesh tells Tony that Quisto was behind the attempt to steal the cargo and orders Tony to kill him. Quisto appears at Tony's door and begs for help. Tony tries to help him escape to Hong Kong, but when confronted by Nicco, has no choice but to send his friend to his death, dropped into a net behind a junk and dragged through the harbor. Upset by Tony being forced to kill Quisto, their mutual friend, Boris decides he no longer wants to be in the business and leaves to find honest work on a ship.

Tony becomes romantically involved with Pamela, so Jean leaves him. Lobero contacts Tony with an idea to steal a million dollars' worth of diamonds from a syndicate courier before delivering them to Lobero. Tony fakes his own death, leaving all his property to Jean and Mama Lin in his will. Bribing his way onto a freighter's crew, he arrives in San Francisco after a year-long trip to evade the syndicate, who suspects he is not dead. He tries to call Lobero, but Lobero is out of town, so he goes to find Pamela, only to find she has written a new novel with a character based on him and is now romantically involved with a professional tennis player. Afterward, he tries to visit Lobero, only to find him murdered by a syndicate gunman. When syndicate men spot him and give chase, he flees to the piers, where Boris finally finds him. Boris gets him on a ship to eventually return to Hong Kong.

Tony contacts Mama Lin and Jean, who are happy he is still alive. He arranges to meet them, but they are followed by syndicate men, so they split up at Tony's urging. Mama Lin asks for assistance from a police officer, who arrests one of the men, alerting the police to the possible presence of Nicco, who had taken Tony's place as the syndicate's Macau chief. Mama Lin meets Tony at the Botanical Gardens and takes a taxi to Victoria Gap, where they pick up Jean, but they are immediately pursued by Nicco and his henchmen. Tony and the women continue to the Star Ferry, with Nicco not far behind. As the women board the ferry, Tony tries to give the diamonds back, but Nicco says it's too late to save his life. As they escort Tony to a syndicate car, the police arrive and swarm the car, arresting them all, leaving the women by themselves, wondering what's to become of Tony.

== Cast ==
- Rory Calhoun as Tony Dumont
- Barbara Rush as Pamela Vincent
- Dolores Donlon as Jean Blake
- Soo Yong as Mama Lin
- Pat Conway as Nicco
- Werner Klemperer as Bendesh
- Mel Welles as Boris
- Paul Picerni as Michael Quisto
- Aram Katcher as Lobero
- Bob Hopkins as Cappy
- Booth Colman as Maxler
- Timothy Carey as Lagarto (as Tim Carey)
- Noel Cravat as Bob Gantz

== See also ==
- List of American films of 1956
