= Apache Territory =

1958 film by Ray Nazarro

- Film poster
- Directed by: Ray Nazarro
- Screenplay by: Charles R. Marion; George W. George
- Adaptation by: Frank Moss
- Based on: Last Stand at Papago Wells by Louis L'Amour
- Produced by: Rory Calhoun; Victor M. Orsatti
- Starring: Rory Calhoun
- Cinematography: Irving Lippman
- Edited by: Al Clark
- Color process: Eastmancolor
- Production company: Rorvic Productions
- Distributed by: Columbia Pictures
- Release date: September 1, 1958
- Running time: 71 minutes
- Country: United States
- Language: English

Apache Territory is a 1958 American Western film directed by Ray Nazarro and produced by and starring Rory Calhoun. It was released by Columbia Pictures. The story is based on the 1957 novel Last Stand at Papago Wells by Louis L'Amour.

Shot on location at Red Rock Canyon in California, this production was Calhoun's last film before moving to television as The Texan on CBS. It was also the final film in the career of co-star Barbara Bates.

== Plot ==
Drifter Logan Cates (Rory Calhoun) spies the desert at a watering hole when he sees Apache Indians about to attack three cowboys. He fires warning shots into the air, allowing the cowboys to flee. Sometime later, Cates encounters a young woman whose parents have been tortured and murdered by Apache Indians.

Sensing the presence of Apaches, Logan brings the girl to a small box canyon that is not only defensible but has a supply of water. He meets up with 19-year-old Lonnie Foreman, who was the only survivor of the group that Cates warned before. The location attracts a variety of people escaping the Apaches including a small band of cavalrymen, Logan's former girlfriend, Jennifer Fair, and her fiancée, Grant Kimbrough. On the first night in the canyon, a Pima Indian named Lugo sneaks in looking for water. Though he is wanted for murder by the United States for killing an officer who wanted Lugo's gold, Cates allows him to stay due to his hatred towards the Apache. Lonnie and Junie Hatchett, the girl who Cates rescued earlier, quickly grow attached to one another.

They are besieged by Apache, where Logan the loner gradually discovers that he can not escape the responsibility of leadership of the group through his knowledge of Indian fighting and the local territory as well as his ability to knock sense into their heads when they engage in unhelpful behaviour. The numbers of the cavalrymen slowly dwindle, with initial attacks killing off one soldier as well as the sergeant. One of the cavalrymen, Zimmerman, hatches a plan to escape with Kimbrough, though Jennifer doesn't agree with the plan. Zimmerman is killed when he steals Lugo's gold and runs into the desert, where he is quickly shot. Lugo, however, hid his gold supply and Zimmerman only stole rocks.

As their food supplies dwindle, Cates risks his life by invading the Apache camp for food. Shortly thereafter, their water supplies begin to dwindle as well. Cates motions to ration off the water. More Apache attacks cause the deaths of more cavalrymen, until only Webb and Conley are left. A fellow officer's death leaves Webb enraged, and he runs blindly into the Apache camp, where he is wounded and taken. That night, the sound of his tortured cries torments the survivors. Cates leaves and it is implied that he ends the horror by shooting Webb.

As the wind picks up, Cates decides to put a plan into action: under the cover of a sandstorm, they will fill empty water bottles with black powder and small stones to make grenades and scatter the Apache across the desert. As they prepare to leave, Kimbrough disagrees with Cates' plan to leave Lugo with the women, and though he journeys out with the other men, he quickly returns so he can flee. Jennifer realizes Kimbrough is nothing but a coward and breaks off their engagement. Kimbrough tries to leave but is stopped by Lugo. Kimbrough attempts to draw his gun but Lugo shoots him dead.

Elsewhere, Cates, Conley and Lonnie find the Apache horde. Cates and Lonnie light and throw their grenades successfully, but Conley simply runs into the Apache camp and detonates his grenade at point blank range. The two return to the Box Canyon, where Jennifer reveals the fate of Kimbrough. After the storm passes, Lugo reveals he hid his gold in Cates' saddlebags, and gives a share of his gold to Lonnie so he and Junie can move to California. Lugo, Lonnie and Junie leave, with only Cates and Jennifer remaining. Jennifer leaves, with Cates catching up to her and the two riding off into the distance.

== Cast ==
- Rory Calhoun as Logan Cates
- Barbara Bates as Jennifer Fair
- John Dehner as Grant Kimbrough
- Carolyn Craig as Junie Hatchett
- Tom Pittman as Lonnie Foreman (as Thomas Pittman)
- Leo Gordon as Zimmerman
- Myron Healey as Webb
- Francis De Sales as Sgt. Sheehan (ad Francis DeSales)
- Frank DeKova as Lugo (as Frank deKova)
- Regis Parton as Conley (as Reg Parton)

== Other ==
Seven years prior to this film, Calhoun and Bates portrayed a young couple desperately in love in I'd Climb the Highest Mountain (1951), and Bates played a character named Jenny.
