= Mario Alcalde =

American film and television actor

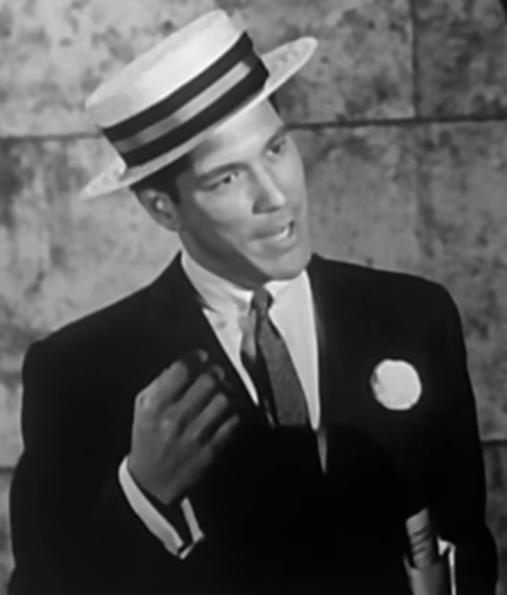
- Alcalde in Man with a Camera, 1958
- Born: September 6, 1926; Key West, Florida, U.S.
- Died: April 22, 1971 (aged 44); Glendale, California, U.S.
- Occupations: Film and television actor
- Spouse: Nancy Alcalde
- Children: 3

Mario Alcalde (September 6, 1926 – April 22, 1971) was an American film and television actor.

Alcalde was born in Key West, Florida, the son of Armando and Amelia Alcalde. Alcalde attended the American Theatre Wing. He began his screen career in 1954, appearing in the television drama series Robert Montgomery Presents. Alcalde then made an appearance in the 1956 film Crowded Paradise, which starred Hume Cronyn and Nancy Kelly. He played as Juan Figueroa. In the early 1950s he had also acted on stage, appearing in an Off-Broadway production of the play Bullfight.

Alcalde later guest-starred in television programs including Gunsmoke, Bonanza, Daniel Boone, Voyage to the Bottom of the Sea, 77 Sunset Strip, Dr. Kildare, The Man from U.N.C.L.E., Man with a Camera, The Virginian and The Wild Wild West. He played the recurring role of Yellow Hawk in the western television series The Texan. Alcalde also played therapist Chuck Atwell in the television soap opera Peyton Place.

Alcalde appeared in films including All the Young Men (1960), Dead Ringer (1964), and Hail, Hero! (1969). His final credit was from the 1971 film Clay Pigeon. He had two screenwriting credits, for the medical drama television series The Nurses and the crime drama television series The Fugitive.

Alcalde died on April 22, 1971 in Glendale, California, at the age of 44.
