= Victor Orsatti =

American film producer (1905-1984)

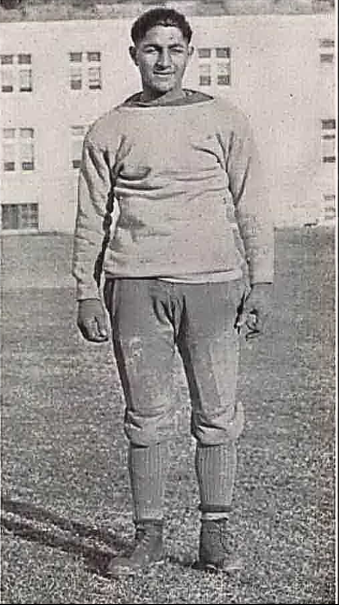
- Orsatti as a high school football player in 1923
- Born: November 25, 1905; Los Angeles, California, US
- Died: June 9, 1984 (aged 78); Orange County, California, US
- Resting place: Pacific View Memorial Park, Corona del Mar, California
- Education: Manual Arts High School
- Alma mater: University of Southern California
- Occupations: Producer; Talent agent
- Spouse(s): June Lang; Marie McDonald; Dolores Donlon; Arla Turner Orsatti
- Relatives: Ernie Orsatti (brother)

Victor Manuel Orsatti (November 25, 1905 – June 9, 1984) was an American talent agent and film producer. As an agent, he represented some of the biggest stars of the 1930s and 1940s, including Judy Garland, Betty Grable, and Edward G. Robinson, as well as directors Frank Capra and George Stevens. He was credited with persuading figure skating champion Sonja Henie to move to Hollywood and become an actress after the 1936 Winter Olympics. He later became a motion picture and television producer, whose works include Flight to Hong Kong and the television series The Texan. He was also married to actress June Lang, singer/actress Marie "The Body" McDonald, and model/actress Dolores Donlon.

== Early years ==
Orsatti was born in Los Angeles, California, the son of Morris Orsatti and Mary Manse, both born in Italy. He had six siblings, including stuntman and baseball player for the St. Louis Cardinals Ernie Orsatti.

Orsatti attended Los Angeles Manual Arts High School. He was recognized in 1923 as the best all-around high school athlete in Los Angeles. He played third base for the baseball team. In 1923, he won a bat with which Babe Ruth had hit the first home run in Yankee Stadium. The bat was the prize given by the Los Angeles Evening Herald for a high school home run hitting contest they sponsored. The bat, which was inscribed to Orsatti, sold in 2004 for $1.2 million.

Orsatti subsequently attended the University of Southern California (USC) where he played quarterback on Howard Jones's 1925 and 1926 USC Trojans football teams, wearing number 5. He also played baseball and ran track and field at USC.

== Hollywood agent and producer ==
Orsatti became a Hollywood talent agent in the 1930s. Along with his brothers Frank, Al and Ernie (a former minor-league baseball player), he was a principal in the Orsatti Talent Agency. He was known as "one of the industry's sharpest agents," and his clients included some of Hollywood's biggest stars, such as Sonja Henie, Judy Garland, Betty Grable, Edward G. Robinson, Frank Capra, George Stevens, Margaret O'Brien, and Alice Faye. His accomplishments as a talent agent include: Orsatti was credited with persuading Sonja Henie to move to Hollywood and become an actress after she won her third gold medal in figure skating at the 1936 Winter Olympics. Henie went on to become one of the highest paid stars in Hollywood. In 1939, syndicated columnist Louella Parsons reported that the romantic relationship between Henie and Orsatti was the talk of Hollywood. Orsatti negotiated the contract for Judy Garland to play the role of Dorothy in The Wizard of Oz. He was also credited with discovering Alexis Smith while she was a student at Los Angeles City College and offering her a screen test.

Orsatti also formed a production company in the 1950s called Saber Productions. The company produced 14 films including Flight to Hong Kong.

Orsatti formed a television production company, Rorvic Productions, in partnership with actor Rory Calhoun. Rorvic produced the CBS television series The Texan.

== Motion picture credits ==
- Flight to Hong Kong (1956) associate producer
- Domino Kid (1957) producer
- The Hired Gun (1957) producer
- Ride Out for Revenge (1957) associate producer
- Apache Territory (1958) producer
- Face in the Rain (1963) executive producer

== Marriages ==
Orsatti was married four times. He was married to film actress June Lang in 1937. Their June 1937 wedding was attended by a guest list like a "Hollywood Who's Who" and was reported as "the biggest movie wedding in years." The breakup of their marriage after only six weeks was also covered in the Hollywood press.

Orsatti was next married in 1943 to singer and actress, Marie McDonald, who was known as "The Body Beautiful" and later nicknamed "The Body". Orsatti was working at the time as a test pilot for Lockheed. McDonald had previously been Bugsy Siegel's girlfriend, and author Tim Adler in his book, "Hollywood and the Mob," described Orsatti as a "gangster-cum-agent" and claimed that his brother Frank Orsatti was "a bootlegger and gangster" who got into the movie business by supplying Louis B. Mayer with alcohol and women and later had a reputation for "handling all of MGM's 'dirty work'." Orsatti and McDonald remained married until 1947. Even after their divorce, McDonald continued to use Orsatti as her agent, noting, "Husbands are much easier to find than good agents."

Orsatti's third marriage was to actress and Playboy Playmate Dolores Donlon. He was married to Donlon from 1949 to 1960.

His fourth wife was Arla Turner Orsatti. They remained married at the time of Orsatti's death in 1984.
