= Ernie Orsatti =

American baseball player (1902–1968)

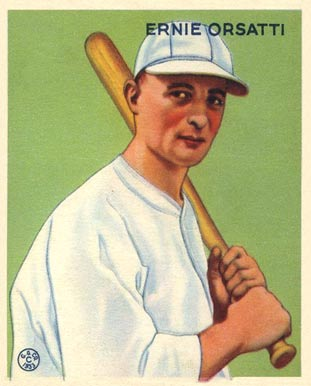
- Ernie Orsatti 1933 Goudey baseball card
- Outfielder
- Born: September 8, 1902; Los Angeles, California, U.S.
- Died: September 4, 1968 (aged 65); Canoga Park, California, U.S.
- Batted: Left Threw: Left

MLB debut
- September 4, 1927, for the St. Louis Cardinals

Last MLB appearance
- September 28, 1935, for the St. Louis Cardinals

MLB statistics
- Batting average: .306
- Home runs: 10
- Runs batted in: 237
- Stats at Baseball Reference

Teams
- St. Louis Cardinals (1927–1935)

Career highlights and awards
- 2× World Series champion (1931, 1934)

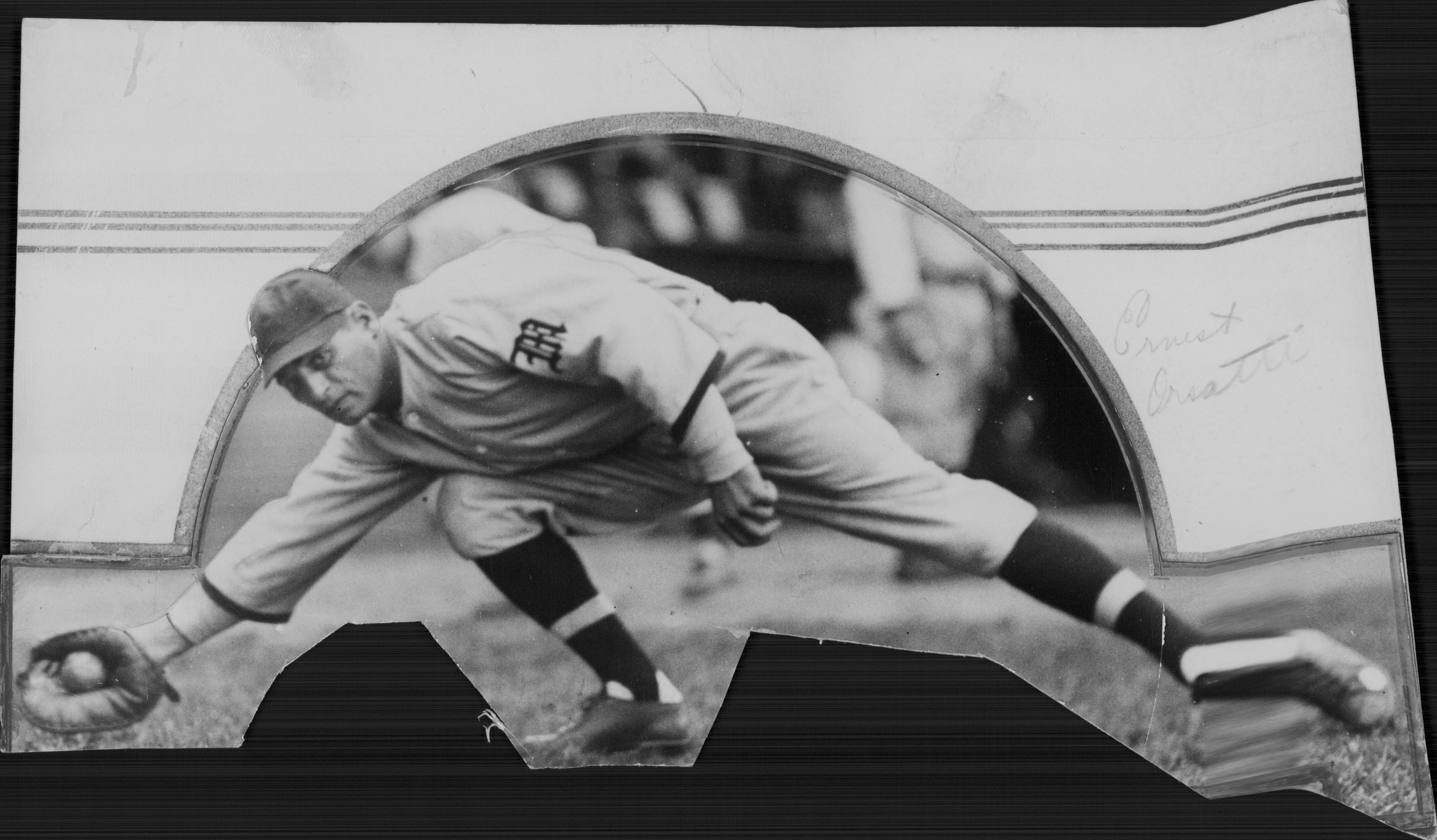
Orsatti on the Minneapolis Millers

Ernest Ralph Orsatti (September 8, 1902 – September 4, 1968) was an American professional baseball player who was an outfielder and first base for the St. Louis Cardinals from 1927 to 1935. Orsatti appeared in four World Series, two of which the Cardinals won. Orsatti's brother Victor was a film producer and talent agent, and Orsatti, who prior to baseball had also worked on movie sets, joined his family's talent agency upon his retirement from baseball.

== Early life ==
Orsatti was born in Los Angeles, California. He was the son of Morris Orsatti and Mary Manse, both born in Italy. He had six siblings. He attended Manual Arts High School in Los Angeles.

== Career ==
In the early 1920s, Orsatti was an assistant prop man who also doubled for Buster Keaton on several of his films. He also played first base and captained Keaton’s stellar amateur baseball team. According to author James Curtis, “Orsatti was so good that one day in 1925 he arrived at work and found a new set of luggage and a check…and was told he was fired. Keaton handed him a contract to play for the Vernon Tigers, in which he retained an interest.” Orsatti would play only six games for the Tigers before quickly moving up to play—batting and throwing left-handed—for the Cedar Rapids Bunnies, with whom he batted .347 and hit 6 home runs. Orsatti later played for the Syracuse team in the International League in 1926 before splitting the1 next season between the Houston Buffaloes of the Texas League and the St. Louis Cardinals. In 1928, he spent most of the season with the Minneapolis Millers of the American Association, and he hit .381 (sixth-highest in the league) over 123 games; he played 27 games for the Cardinals and appeared in his first World Series.

A Cardinals' regular after that point through 1935, Orsatti appeared in three more World Series (1930, 1931 and 1934). He played in 13 World Series games over those four seasons, hitting .273 in those series but only registering two RBIs, both in 1934. The Cardinals won two of those series (1931 and 1934).

After Orsatti had a mediocre season in 1935, the Cardinals were prepared to relegate him to their minor-league club in Rochester. In response, Orsatti wired from California that he was retiring from baseball. He made a brief return to the minor leagues in 1939 before retiring from baseball for good.

In 701 games played, Orsatti posted a .306 batting average (663-2165) with 306 runs scored, 10 home runs, 237 RBI, an on-base percentage of .360 and a slugging percentage of .416 in nine seasons. His career fielding percentage was .979.

== Personal life ==
Orsatti married opera singer Inez Gorman and had three children. One of his children, Ernie F. Orsatti, became a famous stunt man and actor, best known for his free fall into a skylight in The Poseidon Adventure (1972) and as a hero firefighter hanging on to a scenic elevator in The Towering Inferno (1974). One of his brothers was talent agent and producer Victor Orsatti. He joined his brothers in the Orsatti Talent Agency after retiring from baseball. In 1946, the agency was said to be "third from the top where movie actors' agents get together." He also owned a floral and oddity shop with his brothers-in-law and received royalties on the sales of candy bars in Southern California movie theaters.

Orsatti died in 1968 in Canoga Park, California four days shy of his 66th birthday.
