= Dolores Donlon =

American actress and model (1920-2012)

- Born: Patricia Vaniver; September 19, 1920; Philadelphia, Pennsylvania, U.S.
- Died: November 30, 2012 (aged 92); Philadelphia, Pennsylvania, U.S.
- Other names: Delores Donlon, Pat Van Iver
- Occupations: Actress, model
- Years active: 1944-1962
- Spouse(s): Victor Orsatti (m. 1949; div. 1960) Robert dePasquale (m. 1962; div. 19??); Fernando Mendez (m. 1974; div. 19??)

Dolores Donlon (born Patricia Vaniver; September 19, 1920 – November 30, 2012) was an American model and actress.

== Career ==
Born in 1920 in Philadelphia and raised in Upper Darby Township, Pennsylvania, Donlon attended a convent school in Tarrytown, New York. She later trimmed a few years off her age by claiming 1926 was her year of birth when she began modeling in the mid-1940s under the name Pat Van Iver. for the Walter Thornton Model Agency. She began acting in 1948 with uncredited walk-on parts in movies including Dough Girls and Easter Parade.

In 1946, she was elected Queen of the Ball by the New York Press Photographers Association. By 1954, she was playing credited roles in movies such as The Long Wait and Security Risk, and appearing in television series. Her television credits include roles in Have Gun - Will Travel, The Texan, Richard Diamond, Private Detective, Maverick, Perry Mason, The Jack Benny Program, 77 Sunset Strip and I Love Lucy.

In 1957, Donlon was Playboy's August Playmate of the Month.

She starred in Italian director Franco Rossi's 1961 film Nude Odyssey.

== Marriages ==
Donlon married to Hollywood talent agent Victor Orsatti in 1949; they separated in 1958 and were divorced in 1960. She retired from acting in 1962, after marrying New York Philharmonic violinist Robert dePasquale. She later divorced dePasquale and married Fernando Mendez. That union also ended in divorce. All three marriages were childless.

== Death ==
Donlon died in her native Philadelphia, Pennsylvania, on November 30, 2012, aged 92.

== Filmography ==
- 1959 Perry Mason as Dawn Manning, episode: "The Case of the Calendar Girl"

June Blair	Sally Todd	Saundra Edwards	Gloria Windsor	Dawn Richard	Carrie Radison
Jean Jani	Dolores Donlon	Jacquelyn Prescott	Colleen Farrington	Marlene Callahan	Linda Vargas
