= The Texan (TV series) =

American Western television series (1958–1960)

- Genre: Western
- Written by: Curtis Kenyon; Harry Kronman; Edmund Morris
- Directed by: George Archainbaud; Felix E. Feist; Robert Gordon; Erle C. Kenton; Hollingsworth Morse; Edward Ludwig
- Starring: Rory Calhoun; Mario Alcalde; Duncan Lamont
- Country of origin: United States
- Original language: English
- No. of seasons: 2
- No. of episodes: 78 (list of episodes)

Production
- Executive producers: Desi Arnaz; Rory Calhoun; Victor M. Orsatti
- Producer: Jerry Stagg
- Running time: 30 mins.
- Production company: Desilu Productions

Original release
- Network: CBS
- Release: September 29, 1958 – September 19, 1960

The Texan is an American Western television series starring film and television actor Rory Calhoun, which aired on the CBS television network from 1958 to 1960.

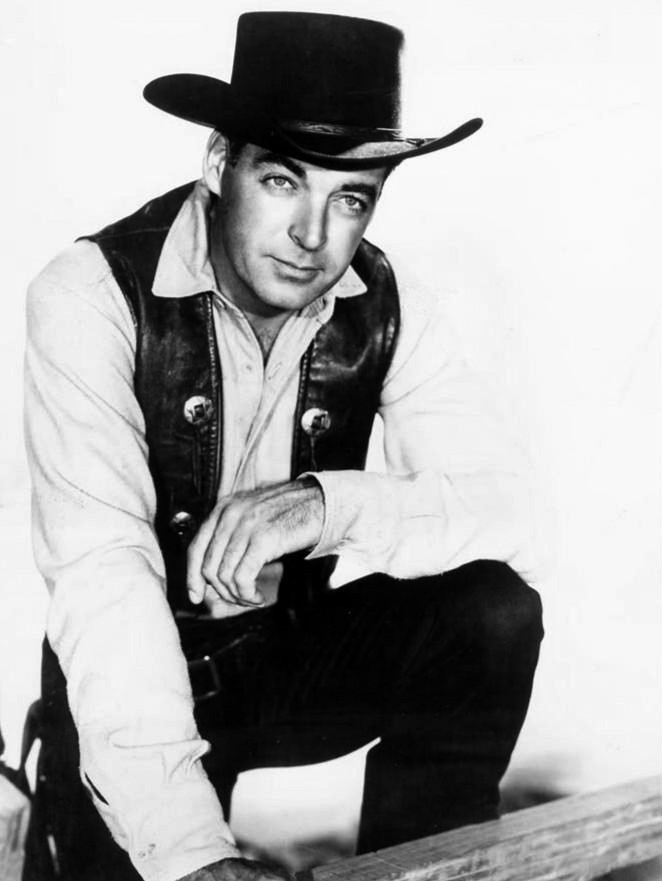
Calhoun as Bill Longley (circa 1960)

== Synopsis ==
Rory Calhoun plays gunman Bill Longley, "The Texan," who travels across Texas from town to town in the wake of the Civil War. His reputation as a gunfighter precedes him and often brings trouble wherever he ends up next. Mario Alcalde played as Yellow Hawk from 1959. Duncan Lamont played as David MacMorris in its final season. His character was known as Mac.

== Episodes ==
=== Series overview ===
Season	Episodes	Originally released		Rank	Average viewership (in millions)
Season	Episodes	First released	Last released	Rank	Average viewership (in millions)
1	37	September 29, 1958	June 15, 1959	15	12.4
2	41	September 14, 1959	September 5, 1960	Not in top 30	TBA

=== Season 1 (1958–59) ===
No. overall	No. in season	Title	Directed by	Written by	Original release date
1	1	"Texan in Town" "Law of the Gun"	Erle C. Kenton	Harry Kronman	September 29, 1958
Featuring Neville Brand, John Larch and Karl Swenson.
2	2	"The Man with the Solid Gold Star"	Hollingsworth Morse	Robert Hardy Andrews	October 6, 1958
Featuring Thomas Gomez and Robert Burton.
3	3	"The Troubled Town"	Hollingsworth Morse	Samuel A. Peeples	October 13, 1958
Featuring James Drury, Pat Conway, Harry Dean Stanton and Walter Sande.
4	4	"The First Notch"	Hollingsworth Morse	Herbert Little, Jr. & David Victor	October 20, 1958
Featuring J. Carrol Naish and Peggie Castle.
5	5	"The Edge of the Cliff"	Allen H. Miner	Paul Franklin	October 27, 1958
Featuring Mike Connors.
6	6	"Jail for the Innocents"	Erle C. Kenton	Story by : Harry Landers; Teleplay by : Jack Roberts & Laszlo Vadnay	November 3, 1958
Featuring Vaughn Taylor.
7	7	"A Tree for Planting"	Robert Florey	Harry Kronman	November 10, 1958
Featuring James Westerfield, Martin Garralaga and Paul Fix.
8	8	"The Hemp Tree"	Erle C. Kenton	Paul Franklin	November 17, 1958
Featuring Michael Landon and Stuart Randall.
9	9	"The Widow of Paradise"	Robert B. Sinclair	Phil Shuken & John L. Greene	November 24, 1958
Featuring Russell Thorson.
10	10	"Desert Passage"	Erle C. Kenton	Martin Berkeley & Clarke E. Reynolds	December 1, 1958
Featuring R.G. Armstrong.
11	11	"No Tears for the Dead"	Erle C. Kenton	Harry Kronman	December 8, 1958
Featuring Michael Pate, Beverly Washburn and Ray Teal.
12	12	"The Easterner"	Erle C. Kenton	Jack Roberts & Tom Monroe	December 15, 1958
Featuring Fay Spain and Jack Elam.
13	13	"A Time of the Year"	Robert Florey	Harry Kronman	December 22, 1958
Featuring George Macready.
14	14	"The Lord Will Provide"	Erle C. Kenton	Phil Shuken & John L. Greene	December 29, 1958
Featuring Milton Frome, Ellen Corby, Ross Elliott and Francis McDonald.
15	15	"The Duchess of Denver"	Erle C. Kenton	Joseph Landon	January 5, 1959
Featuring Dolores Donlon and Gerald Mohr.
16	16	"A Quart of Law"	Robert Gordon	Harry Kronman	January 12, 1959
Featuring Edgar Stehli.
17	17	"Outpost"	Erle C. Kenton	Martin Berkeley & Clark Reynolds	January 19, 1959
Featuring Les Tremayne and Patrick McVey.
18	18	"The Peddler"	Robert Gordon	Laszlo Vadnay	January 26, 1959
Featuring Lou Jacobi.
19	19	"Return to Friendly"	Erle C. Kenton	Harry Kronman	February 2, 1959
Featuring James Philbrook and Mary Webster.
20	20	"The Man Behind the Star"	Alvin Ganzer	Martin Berkeley & Clark Reynolds	February 9, 1959
Featuring Richard Jaeckel, Jean Willes and Brian Donlevy.
21	21	"The Ringer"	Erle C. Kenton	George F. Slavin	February 16, 1959
22	22	"The Eyes of Captain Wylie"	Unknown	Unknown	February 23, 1959
Featuring Chill Wills.
23	23	"The Marshal of Yellow Jacket"	Robert Gordon	Story by : Louis L'Amour; Teleplay by : Harry Kronman	March 2, 1959
Featuring Robert J. Wilke, Kathryn Card and Kenneth MacDonald.
24	24	"No Love Wasted"	Robert Florey	Harry Kronman	March 9, 1959
Featuring Lon Chaney Jr.
25	25	"A Race for Life"	Erle C. Kenton	Barney Slater	March 16, 1959
Featuring Frank Ferguson and Ralph Moody.
26	26	"Letter of the Law"	George Archainbaud	Story by : Irving Wallace; Teleplay by : Irving Wallace & Jack Roberts	March 23, 1959
Featuring R. G. Armstrong, Trevor Bardette, Stuart Randall and Norman Alden.
27	27	"Private Account"	Robert Gordon	Harry Kronman	April 6, 1959
Featuring Jesse White and Karen Sharpe.
28	28	"Caballero"	Robert Gordon	Barney Slater	April 13, 1959
Featuring Cesar Romero, Mari Blanchard and Whit Bissell.
29	29	"Blood Money"	Leslie Goodwins	Dean Riesner	April 20, 1959
Featuring Ralph Meeker, Dorothy Provine and Robert J. Wilke.
30	30	"No Place to Stop"	Erle C. Kenton	Louis L'Amour	April 27, 1959
Featuring Denver Pyle and Strother Martin.
31	31	"Reunion"	Robert Gordon	Harry Kronman	May 4, 1959
32	32	"Badlands"	Leslie Goodwins	Martin Berkeley & Clark Reynolds	May 11, 1959
Featuring Stephen McNally and Myron Healey.
33	33	"South of the Border"	Joe Parker	Don Martin	May 18, 1959
Featuring Jack Elam, John Doucette and Joyce Meadows.
34	34	"The Smiling Loser"	Robert Gordon	Jerry D. Lewis	May 25, 1959
Featuring Eddie Quillan and Harry Lauter.
35	35	"The Sheriff of Boot Hill"	Erle C. Kenton	Sid Harris	June 1, 1959
Featuring Reed Hadley and Denver Pyle.
36	36	"The Gunfighter"	Erle C. Kenton	Story by : Joel Kane & Lee Karson; Teleplay by : Donald S. Sanford	June 8, 1959
37	37	"The Man Hater"	Robert Gordon	David Evans	June 15, 1959
Featuring Lori Nelson, William Tannen and Charles Horvath.

=== Season 2 (1959–60) ===
No. overall	No. in season	Title	Directed by	Written by	Original release date
38	1	"No Way Out"	Erle C. Kenton	Barney Slater	September 14, 1959
Featuring Joe Turkel.
39	2	"Image of Guilt"	Erle C. Kenton	John R. Roberts & Joe Conway	September 21, 1959
Featuring Chris Alcaide and Don Haggerty.
40	3	"Cattle Drive"	Edward Ludwig	Gerald Drayson Adams	September 28, 1959
Featuring Claude Akins and Whitney Blake.
41	4	"The Dishonest Posse"	Robert Florey	Martin Berkeley	October 5, 1959
Featuring Peter Whitney, Bill Erwin, Henry Rowland, Bing Russell and Nestor Paiva.
42	5	"Blue Norther"	Robert Florey	Paul Leslie Peil	October 12, 1959
43	6	"Traildust"	Edward Ludwig	John L. Greene & Phillip Shuken	October 19, 1959
Featuring Brian Donlevy, Addison Richards and Nan Peterson.
44	7	"The Telegraph Story"	Edward Ludwig	Edmund Morris	October 26, 1959
45	8	"Stampede"	Erle C. Kenton	Samuel A. Peeples	November 2, 1959
Part 1. Featuring Michael Dante, Mario Alcalde, Pedro Gonzalez Gonzalez and Shirley Knight.
46	9	"Showdown at Abilene"	Erle C. Kenton	Samuel A. Peeples	November 9, 1959
Part 2. Featuring BarBara Luna, Roy Barcroft and Charles Horvath.
47	10	"The Reluctant Bridegroom"	Unknown	Unknown	November 16, 1959
Part 3. Featuring Ralph Moody.
48	11	"Trouble on the Trail"	Erle C. Kenton	Samuel A. Peeples	November 23, 1959
Part 4. Featuring Michael Dante, Mario Alcalde, Pedro Gonzalez Gonzalez and Kay E. Kuter.
49	12	"Cowards Don't Die"	Edward Ludwig	Harry Kronman	November 30, 1959
Featuring Karl Swenson, Robert J. Wilke and Bern Hoffman.
50	13	"Border Incident"	Edward Ludwig	Gerald Drayson Adams	December 7, 1959
Featuring Claude Akins, Whitney Blake and Rodolfo Hoyos Jr.
51	14	"Dangerous Ground"	Edward Ludwig	Harry Kronman	December 14, 1959
Part 1. Featuring Alan Hale Jr. and Kipp Hamilton.
52	15	"End of Track"	Edward Ludwig	Harry Kronman	December 21, 1959
Part 2.
53	16	"Rough Track to Payday"	Unknown	Unknown	December 28, 1959
Featuring Myrna Dell, Gregg Barton and Neely Edwards.
54	17	"Friend of the Family"	Edward Ludwig	Harry Kronman	January 4, 1960
Featuring John Dehner and James Coburn.
55	18	"The Taming of Rio Nada"	Edward Ludwig	Samuel A. Peeples	January 11, 1960
Part 1. Featuring Barbara Stuart.
56	19	"Sixgun Street"	Erle C. Kenton	Samuel A. Peeples	January 18, 1960
Part 2.
57	20	"The Terrified Town"	Erle C. Kenton	Samuel A. Peeples	January 25, 1960
Part 3.
58	21	"Thirty Hours to Kill"	Robert Florey	Story by : Paul Gangelin & John R. Roberts; Teleplay by : John R. Roberts	February 1, 1960
Featuring Mort Mills and Katherine Squire. Actor Morris Ankrum is credited as the sheriff but actor Stacy Keach Sr. (uncredited) actually appears as the character.
59	22	"Quarantine"	Edward Ludwig	Milton Raison	February 8, 1960
Part 1. Featuring Lita Baron, Duncan Lamont, Frank Ferguson, Don Beddoe and Douglas Kennedy.
60	23	"Buried Treasure"	Edward Ludwig	Milton Raison	February 15, 1960
Part 2. Featuring Alan Hale Jr.
61	24	"Captive Crew"	Erle C. Kenton	Story by : Milton M. Raison; Teleplay by : Erle C. Kenton	February 22, 1960
Part 3. Featuring Kipp Hamilton, Michael Pate and Mike Mazurki.
62	25	"Showdown"	Erle C. Kenton	Harry Kronman	February 29, 1960
Part 4. Featuring Alan Hale Jr., Duncan Lamont, Anthony Caruso, Hugh Sanders and Ron Hayes.
63	26	"Borrowed Time"	Harry Harris	Harry Harris	March 7, 1960
Featuring Ann Robinson, Russ Conway and Raymond Greenleaf.
64	27	"The Governor's Lady"	Edward Ludwig	Harry Kronman	March 14, 1960
Featuring Lita Baron and Myron Healey.
65	28	"Town Divided"	Edward Ludwig	Robert Leslie Bellem	March 21, 1960
Featuring Morgan Woodward, June Blair and Walter Coy.
66	29	"The Guilty and the Innocent"	Jerry A. Baerwitz	Story by : Jerry Baerwitz; Teleplay by : John Grey	March 28, 1960
Featuring Robert F. Simon, Percy Helton and Denver Pyle.
67	30	"Presentation Gun"	Jerry A. Baerwitz	Robert Leslie Bellem	April 4, 1960
Featuring Stafford Repp and Robert Brubaker.
68	31	"Ruthless Woman"	Harry Harris	Story by : Buckley Angell; Teleplay by : Victor Orsatti & Buckley Angell	April 11, 1960
69	32	"The Nomad"	Jerry A. Baerwitz	Rory Calhoun	April 18, 1960
70	33	"Killer's Road"	Edward Ludwig	Ben Lewis & Edward Ludwig	April 25, 1960
Featuring Robert J. Wilke, James Best and Lane Bradford.
71	34	"Lady Tenderfoot"	Harry Harris	Erle C. Kenton	May 9, 1960
Featuring Claire Kelly, Jack Elam and Emory Parnell.
72	35	"The Invisible Noose"	Edward Ludwig	Jack Roberts	May 16, 1960
Featuring Charles Maxwell and Bill Erwin.
73	36	"The Mountain Man"	Louis King	Kathleen Hite, James Gunn, & Christopher Knopf	May 23, 1960
Featuring Peter Palmer, Ben Wright and Harry Shannon. Rory Calhoun does not appear in this episode; this was a pilot episode for a series starring Palmer, but was not picked up.
74	37	"Johnny Tuvo"	Edward Ludwig	Frank Chase	May 30, 1960
Featuring Ron Hagerthy, Frank Wilcox, Myron Healey and Mary Webster.
75	38	"The Accuser"	Erle C. Kenton	Story by : Frank Moss; Teleplay by : Erle C. Kenton	June 6, 1960
Featuring Don Haggerty and Kristine Miller.
76	39	"Mission to Monterrey"	Erle C. Kenton	Erle C. Kenton & Will Gould	June 13, 1960
Featuring Eduardo Noriega.
77	40	"Badman"	Erle C. Kenton	Erle C. Kenton	June 20, 1960
Featuring Celia Lovsky.
78	41	"24 Hours to Live"	Robert Florey	Story by : George Callahan & Crane Wilbur; Teleplay by : George Callahan	September 5, 1960
Featuring Paul Birch and Wendell Holmes.

== Production ==
Operating on a budget of $40,000 per episode, two episodes per week were filmed on stage 11 at Desilu. Location shooting was completed at Pearl Flats.

== Release ==
=== Broadcast ===
The original broadcast of The Texan aired 8:00–8:30 Monday evenings from September 1958 to September 1960 on CBS. ABC aired reruns of the program during its weekday lineup from October 1960 to March 1962, and then as part of its Saturday morning lineup from February to May 1962.

=== Home media ===
Timeless Media Group released 70 episodes of the series on DVD.

== Reception ==
The show was #15 in the 1958–59 season with an average viewership of 12.4 million, but it failed to rank in the top 30 the following season.

== Media information ==
Like many of the television Westerns of the 1950s, The Texan was adapted to a comic by Dan Spiegle in 1960.
