= List of adventure films of the 1960s =

A list of adventure films released in the 1960s.

== 1960 ==
Title	Director	Cast	Country	Subgenre/Notes
The 3 Worlds of Gulliver	Jack Sher	Kerwin Mathews	United States	Family-oriented adventure, fantasy adventure
12 to the Moon	David Bradley	Ken Clark, Michi Kobi, Tom Conway, Anna-Lisa	United States	Space adventure
The Adventures of Huckleberry Finn	Michael Curtiz	Eddie Hodges, Archie Moore, Tony Randall, Neville Brand	United States	
L'Avventura	Michelangelo Antonioni	Gabriele Ferzetti, Monica Vitti, Lea Massari	Italy; France	Adventure drama
Os Bandeirantes	Marcel Camus	Raymond Loyer, Léa Garcia, Elga Andersen, Almiro do Esperito Santo, Lourdes de Oliveira	Brazil; France; Italy	
The Boy and the Pirates	Bert I. Gordon	Charles Herbert, Susan Gordon, Murvyn Vye	United States	Pirate film, family-oriented adventure, fantasy adventure
Burning Sands	Raphael Nussbaum	Daliah Lavi	Israel; West Germany	
Le Capitan	André Hunebelle	Jean Marais, Bourvil, Elsa Martinelli	France; Italy	
Cavalcata selvaggia	Piero Pierotti	Massimo Girotti	Italy	
Colossus and the Amazon Queen	Vittorio Sala	Rod Taylor, Ed Fury, Dorian Gray, Gianna Maria Canale	Italy	Adventure comedy
The Conqueror of the Orient	Tanio Boccia	Gianna Maria Canale, Rik Battaglia	Italy	
The Cossacks	Victor Tourjansky	Edmund Purdom, John Drew Barrymore, Giorgia Moll, Pierre Brice	Italy; France	
The Dam on the Yellow River	Renzo Merusi	Anita Ekberg, Georges Marchal	Italy; France	
David and Goliath	Ferdinando Baldi, Richard Pottier	Orson Welles, Ivica Pajer, Hilton Edwards	Italy	
Dinosaurus!	Irvin Yeaworth	Ward Ramsey, Paul Lukather, Kristina Hanson	United States	Science fiction adventure
The Fenouillard Family	Yves Robert	Sophie Desmarets, Jean Richard	France	Adventure comedy
Flitterwochen in der Hölle	Johannes Kai	Christiane Nielsen, Jan Hendriks, Erwin Strahl	West Germany	
Fury of the Pagans	Guido Malatesta	Edmund Purdom, Rossana Podestà	Italy	
Gustav Adolf's Page	Rolf Hansen	Curd Jürgens, Liselotte Pulver	West Germany	
Hatifa	Siegfried Hartmann	Gisela Büttner, Harry Hindemith, Fred Düren	East Germany	
Heldinnen	Dietrich Haugk	Marianne Koch, Johanna von Koczian, Paul Hubschmid	West Germany	Adventure comedy, musical
Horrors of Spider Island	Fritz Böttger	Alexander D'Arcy, Barbara Valentin, Rainer Brandt, Harald Maresch	West Germany	Horror adventure
The Huns	Sergio Grieco	Chelo Alonso, Jacques Sernas, Folco Lulli	Italy; France	
Island of the Amazons	Otto Meyer	Ann Smyrner, Adrian Hoven, Jan Hendriks	West Germany	Sea adventure
Juanito	Fernando Palacios	Pablito Calvo, Georg Thomalla, Sabine Bethmann, Hans von Borsody	Spain; West Germany; Argentina	Western
Kidnapped	Robert Stevenson	Peter Finch, James MacArthur, Bernard Lee	United Kingdom; United States	
Knight of 100 Faces	Pino Mercanti	Lex Barker, Liana Orfei, Gérard Landry	Italy	
Knights of the Teutonic Order	Aleksander Ford	Andrzej Szalawski, Grażyna Staniszewska, Mieczysław Kalenik	Poland	
The Last Voyage	Andrew L. Stone	Robert Stack, Dorothy Malone, George Sanders, Edmond O'Brien	United States	Sea adventure
Letter Never Sent	Mikhail Kalatozov	Tatiana Samoilova, Innokenty Smoktunovsky, Vasily Livanov, Yevgeni Urbansky	Soviet Union	
The Lost World	Irwin Allen	Claude Rains, Michael Rennie, Jill St. John	United States	Fantasy adventure
Macumba Love	Douglas Fowley	Walter Reed, Ziva Rodann, William Wellman Jr., June Wilkinson, Ruth de Souza	United States; Brazil	
Mistress of the World	William Dieterle	Martha Hyer, Carlos Thompson, Micheline Presle, Sabu, Gino Cervi, Lino Ventura, Wolfgang Preiss, Valéry Inkijinoff	West Germany; France; Italy	
Moment of Danger	László Benedek	Trevor Howard, Dorothy Dandridge, Edmund Purdom	United Kingdom	
Morgan, the Pirate	Andre DeToth	Steve Reeves, Valérie Lagrange, Chelo Alonso	Italy; France	Pirate film
A Morte Comanda o Cangaço	Carlos Coimbra, Walter Guimarães Motta	Alberto Ruschel, Aurora Duarte, Milton Ribeiro	Brazil	
North to Alaska	Henry Hathaway	John Wayne, Stewart Granger, Capucine	United States	Western, adventure comedy
Passport to China	Michael Carreras	Richard Basehart	United Kingdom	
Pirates of the Coast	Domenico Paolella	Lex Barker	Italy; France	
The Prince in Chains	Luis Lucia	Javier Escrivá, António Vilar, María Mahor, Luis Prendes, Paul Naschy	Spain; Italy	Adventure drama
Queen of the Pirates	Mario Costa	Gianna Maria Canale, Massimo Serato, Scilla Gabel	Italy; West Germany	Pirate film
Revak the Rebel	Rudolph Maté	Jack Palance, Milly Vitale	Italy; United States	
Revenge of the Barbarians	Giuseppe Vari	Anthony Steel, Daniela Rocca, Robert Alda	Italy	
Road of the Giants	Guido Malatesta	Don Megowan, Chelo Alonso, Hildegard Knef	Italy	
Robin Hood and the Pirates	Giorgio Simonelli	Lex Barker, Walter Barnes	Italy	
Sands of the Desert	John Paddy Carstairs	Charlie Drake, Peter Arne, Sarah Branch, Raymond Huntley	United Kingdom	Adventure comedy
The Secret of the Purple Reef	William Witney	Jeff Richards, Margia Dean, Peter Falk, Richard Chamberlain	United States	Sea adventure
September Storm	Byron Haskin	Joanne Dru, Mark Stevens	United States	Sea adventure
Sergeant X	Bernard Borderie	Christian Marquand, Noëlle Adam, Paul Guers	France	
Seven in the Sun	Sergio Bergonzelli	Frank Latimore, Gianna Maria Canale, John Kitzmiller	Italy	
Siege of Syracuse	Pietro Francisci	Rossano Brazzi, Tina Louise, Sylva Koscina, Enrico Maria Salerno, Gino Cervi	Italy	
Son of Samson	Carlo Campogalliani	Mark Forest, Chelo Alonso	Italy; France; Yugoslavia	
Space-Men	Antonio Margheriti	Rik Van Nutter	Italy	Space adventure
Spartacus	Stanley Kubrick	Kirk Douglas, Laurence Olivier, Jean Simmons, Charles Laughton, Peter Ustinov, Tony Curtis	United States	
Stowaway in the Sky	Albert Lamorisse	Pascal Lamorisse, André Gille	France	Family-oriented adventure
The Sundowners	Fred Zinnemann	Deborah Kerr, Robert Mitchum, Peter Ustinov, Glynis Johns	United Kingdom; Australia	
Swiss Family Robinson	Ken Annakin	John Mills, Dorothy McGuire, James MacArthur	United States; United Kingdom	Sea adventure, family-oriented adventure
Sword of Sherwood Forest	Terence Fisher	Richard Greene, Peter Cushing, Nigel Green, Oliver Reed	United Kingdom	
Tarzan the Magnificent	Robert Day	Gordon Scott, Jock Mahoney, John Carradine, Alexandra Stewart	United States	
Ten Who Dared	William Beaudine	Brian Keith	United States	Western
Terror of the Red Mask	Luigi Capuano	Lex Barker, Chelo Alonso, Liana Orfei	Italy	
The Time Machine	George Pal	Rod Taylor, Alan Young, Yvette Mimieux, Sebastian Cabot	United States	Fantasy adventure
Under Ten Flags	Duilio Coletti	Van Heflin, Charles Laughton, Mylène Demongeot, Folco Lulli	Italy; United States	War adventure, sea adventure
The Warrior Empress	Pietro Francisci	Tina Louise, Kerwin Mathews, Enrico Maria Salerno	Italy; France	
Weit ist der Weg	Wolfgang Schleif	Freddy Quinn, Ingeborg Schöner, Leon Askin	West Germany	Musical
William Tell	Michel Dickoff	Robert Freitag, Wolfgang Rottsieper	Switzerland	

== 1961 ==
Title	Director	Cast	Country	Subgenre/Notes
Amazons of Rome	Carlo Ludovico Bragaglia, Vittorio Cottafavi	Louis Jourdan, Sylvia Syms, Nicole Courcel	Italy; France	
Atlantis, the Lost Continent	George Pal	Sal Ponti, Joyce Taylor	United States	Fantasy adventure
Atlas in the Land of the Cyclops	Antonio Leonviola	Gordon Mitchell, Chelo Alonso	Italy	Fantasy adventure
Barabbas	Richard Fleischer	Anthony Quinn, Arthur Kennedy, Silvana Mangano, Ernest Borgnine, Jack Palance, Katy Jurado, Vittorio Gassman, Valentina Cortese	United States; Italy	
The Best of Enemies	Guy Hamilton	David Niven, Alberto Sordi, Michael Wilding, Harry Andrews, Amedeo Nazzari	Italy; United Kingdom	War adventure, adventure comedy
The Big Gamble	Richard Fleischer	Stephen Boyd, Juliette Gréco	United States	
Captain Fracasse	Pierre Gaspard-Huit	Jean Marais, Gérard Barray, Geneviève Grad, Louis de Funès	France; Italy	
Capitani di ventura	Angelo Dorigo	Mario Petri, Gérard Landry, Paul Muller	Italy	
El Cid	Anthony Mann	Charlton Heston, Sophia Loren, Raf Vallone, Geneviève Page, Herbert Lom	United States; Italy	
The Colossus of Rhodes	Sergio Leone	Rory Calhoun, Lea Massari, Georges Marchal	Italy; France; Spain	
Il conquistatore di Maracaibo	Eugenio Martín	Hans von Borsody, Luisella Boni	Italy; Spain	Pirate film
The Corsican Brothers	Anton Giulio Majano	Geoffrey Horne, Valérie Lagrange, Gérard Barray, Jean Servais, Amedeo Nazzari	Italy; France	
The Count of Monte Cristo	Claude Autant-Lara	Louis Jourdan, Yvonne Furneaux, Pierre Mondy	France; Italy	
Creature from the Haunted Sea	Roger Corman	Antony Carbone, Betsy Jones-Moreland, Edward Wain	United States	Horror adventure, sea adventure, adventure comedy
The Devil at 4 O'Clock	Mervyn LeRoy	Spencer Tracy, Frank Sinatra, Kerwin Mathews, Jean-Pierre Aumont, Grégoire Aslan, Marcel Dalio	United States	
Erik the Conqueror	Mario Bava	Cameron Mitchell, George Ardisson, Kessler Twins, Andrea Checchi, Folco Lulli	Italy; France	Sea adventure
The Fabulous Baron Munchausen	Karel Zeman	Miloš Kopecký, Jana Brejchová	Czechoslovakia	Live-action/animated film, fantasy adventure, family-oriented adventure
The Fiercest Heart	George Sherman	Stuart Whitman, Juliet Prowse, Geraldine Fitzgerald, Raymond Massey	United States	
Flight of the Lost Balloon	Nathan H. Juran	Mala Powers, Marshall Thompson, James Lanphier, Douglas Kennedy	United States	Romantic adventure
Fury at Smugglers' Bay	John Gilling	Peter Cushing, Bernard Lee, Michèle Mercier, John Fraser	United Kingdom	
Gold of the Seven Saints	Gordon Douglas	Clint Walker, Roger Moore	United States	Western
Goliath Against the Giants	Guido Malatesta	Brad Harris, Gloria Milland, Fernando Rey, Fernando Sancho	Italy; Spain	Fantasy adventure
Le Goût de la violence	Robert Hossein	Robert Hossein, Giovanna Ralli, Mario Adorf	France; Italy; West Germany	
The Guns of Navarone	J. Lee Thompson	Gregory Peck, David Niven, Anthony Quinn, Irene Papas, Stanley Baker	United States; United Kingdom	War adventure
Guns of the Black Witch	Domenico Paolella	Don Megowan, Silvana Pampanini	Italy; France	Pirate film
The Hellfire Club	Robert S. Baker, Monty Berman	Keith Michell, Adrienne Corri, Peter Cushing, Peter Arne, Kai Fischer	United Kingdom	
The Hellions	Ken Annakin	Richard Todd	United Kingdom; South Africa	Western
Hercules and the Conquest of Atlantis	Vittorio Cottafavi	Reg Park, Fay Spain, Ettore Manni, Luciano Marin, Laura Efrikian	Italy; France	Fantasy adventure
Hercules in the Haunted World	Mario Bava	Reg Park, Christopher Lee	Italy	
Journey Beneath the Desert	Edgar G. Ulmer	Haya Harareet, Jean-Louis Trintignant, Amedeo Nazzari, Georges Rivière, Gian Maria Volonté	France; Italy	
Juana Gallo	Miguel Zacarías	María Félix, Jorge Mistral	Mexico	Western
La Fayette	Jean Dréville	Michel Le Royer, Orson Welles, Jack Hawkins, Vittorio De Sica, Rosanna Schiaffino, Liselotte Pulver, Folco Lulli, Wolfgang Preiss, Edmund Purdom, Georges Rivière	France; Italy	
The Last of the Vikings	Giacomo Gentilomo	Cameron Mitchell, Edmund Purdom, Isabelle Corey, George Ardisson	Italy; France	Sea adventure
Maciste alla corte del Gran Khan	Riccardo Freda	Gordon Scott, Yoko Tani	Italy; France	
Marco Polo	Piero Pierotti, Hugo Fregonese	Rory Calhoun, Yoko Tani	Italy; France	
Master of the World	William Witney	Vincent Price, Charles Bronson, Henry Hull	United States	Fantasy adventure
Le Miracle des loups	André Hunebelle	Jean Marais, Rosanna Schiaffino, Jean-Louis Barrault, Roger Hanin	France; Italy	
The Mongols	Andre DeToth, Leopoldo Savona	Jack Palance, Anita Ekberg	Italy; France	
The Musketeers	Annelise Hovmand	Jens Østerholm, Dirch Passer, Birgitte Federspiel	Denmark	
Mysterious Island	Cy Endfield	Michael Craig, Joan Greenwood, Michael Callan, Herbert Lom	United Kingdom; United States	Fantasy adventure
Odissea nuda	Franco Rossi	Enrico Maria Salerno, Dolores Donlon	Italy; France	
One Hundred and One Dalmatians	Wolfgang Reitherman, Hamilton Luske, Clyde Geronimi	Rod Taylor (voice), Cate Bauer (voice), Betty Lou Gerson (voice)	United States	Animated film, family-oriented adventure
Our House in Cameroon	Alfred Vohrer	Götz George, Johanna von Koczian, Horst Frank, Hans Söhnker	West Germany	
The Phantom Planet	William Marshall	Dean Fredericks, Dolores Faith, Francis X. Bushman, Coleen Gray, Anthony Dexter	United States	Space adventure
Pirates of Tortuga	Robert D. Webb	Ken Scott, Letícia Román, Dave King, John Richardson, Rafer Johnson, Robert Stephens	United States	Pirate film
Queen of the Seas	Umberto Lenzi	Lisa Gastoni, Jerome Courtland, Walter Barnes	Italy; France	Pirate film
The Rage of the Buccaneers	Mario Costa	Ricardo Montalbán, Vincent Price	Italy	Pirate film, romantic adventure
Revenge of the Conquered	Luigi Capuano	Burt Nelson, Wandisa Guida, Walter Barnes	Italy	
The Romance of a Gaucho	Rubén W. Cavallotti	Walter Vidarte, Julia Sandoval	Argentina	Romantic adventure
Rome 1585	Mario Bonnard	Debra Paget, Antonio Cifariello, Folco Lulli	Italy	
Romolo e Remo	Sergio Corbucci	Steve Reeves, Gordon Scott, Virna Lisi, Massimo Girotti, Jacques Sernas	Italy; France	
Romulus and the Sabines	Richard Pottier	Roger Moore, Mylène Demongeot, Jean Marais, Rosanna Schiaffino, Folco Lulli	France; Italy; Yugoslavia	Adventure comedy
The Sahara Is Burning	Michel Gast	Jean Servais, Paul Guers, Jess Hahn, Magali Noël	France	
The Secret of the Black Falcon	Domenico Paolella	Lex Barker, Walter Barnes	Italy	
The Seven Revenges	Primo Zeglio	Ed Fury, Elaine Stewart, Bella Cortez	Italy; Yugoslavia	
La spada della vendetta	Luigi Latini De Marchi	Frank Latimore	Italy; France	
Suleiman the Conqueror	Vatroslav Mimica, Mario Tota	Edmund Purdom, Giorgia Moll, Alberto Farnese	Italy; Yugoslavia	
Sword in the Shadows	Luigi Capuano	Tamara Lees, Livio Lorenzon	Italy	
Sword of the Conqueror	Carlo Campogalliani	Jack Palance, Eleonora Rossi Drago	Italy	
The Tartars	Richard Thorpe, Ferdinando Baldi	Victor Mature, Orson Welles	Italy; Yugoslavia	
Taxi for Tobruk	Denys de La Patellière	Hardy Krüger, Lino Ventura, Charles Aznavour	France	War adventure
The Thief of Baghdad	Arthur Lubin	Steve Reeves, Giorgia Moll	Italy; United States; France	
The Three Musketeers	Bernard Borderie	Gérard Barray, Mylène Demongeot	France; Italy	
Tintin and the Golden Fleece	Jean-Jacques Vierne	Jean-Pierre Talbot, Georges Wilson, Charles Vanel	France	Family-oriented adventure
The Treasure of Monte Cristo	Monty Berman, Robert S. Baker	Rory Calhoun, Gianna Maria Canale	United Kingdom	
Le Trésor des hommes bleus	Edmond Agabra	Lex Barker, Marpessa Dawn, Odile Versois	France; Spain	
Le Triomphe de Michel Strogoff	Victor Tourjansky	Curd Jürgens, Capucine	Italy; France	
The Trojan Horse	Giorgio Ferroni	Steve Reeves, Juliette Mayniel, John Drew Barrymore, Edy Vessel	Italy; France; Yugoslavia	
Ursus and the Tartar Princess	Remigio Del Grosso	Yoko Tani, Akim Tamiroff, Joe Robinson, Ettore Manni	Italy; France	
Valley of the Dragons	Edward Bernds	Cesare Danova, Sean McClory, Joan Staley	United States	Fantasy adventure
Voyage to the Bottom of the Sea	Irwin Allen	Walter Pidgeon, Joan Fontaine, Barbara Eden, Peter Lorre, Frankie Avalon	United States	Sea adventure, adventure drama
White Slave Ship	Silvio Amadio	Pier Angeli, Edmund Purdom, Ivan Desny, Armand Mestral, Michèle Girardon	Italy; France	Sea adventure
Wings of Chance	Eddie Dew	James Brown, Frances Rafferty	Canada; United States	
The Wizard of Baghdad	George Sherman	Dick Shawn, Diane Baker	United States	Adventure comedy, fantasy adventure
The Wonders of Aladdin	Henry Levin, Mario Bava	Donald O'Connor, Vittorio De Sica, Michèle Mercier	Italy; France; United States	Adventure comedy, fantasy adventure
Yojimbo	Akira Kurosawa	Toshirō Mifune, Eijirō Tōno, Tatsuya Nakadai	Japan	

== 1962 ==
Title	Director	Cast	Country	Subgenre/Notes
The 300 Spartans	Rudolph Maté	Richard Egan, Ralph Richardson, David Farrar, Diane Baker	United States	
Adventures of Nils Holgersson	Kenne Fant	Sven Lundberg, Max von Sydow	Sweden	Family-oriented adventure, fantasy adventure
Amphibian Man	Vladimir Chebotaryov, Gennadi Kazansky	Vladimir Korenev, Anastasiya Vertinskaya, Mikhail Kozakov	Soviet Union	Romantic adventure, sea adventure
Attack of the Normans	Giuseppe Vari	Cameron Mitchell, Geneviève Grad, Ettore Manni, Philippe Hersent	Italy	
The Avenger	Giorgio Venturini	Steve Reeves	Italy; France; Yugoslavia	
Avenger of the Seven Seas	Domenico Paolella	Richard Harrison, Michèle Mercier, Walter Barnes	Italy; France	
The Bandit and the Princess	Franz Antel	Helmuth Lohner, Georg Thomalla, Paul Hörbiger	Austria	Adventure comedy
Between Shanghai and St. Pauli	Wolfgang Schleif	Joachim Hansen, Karin Baal, Horst Frank, Bill Ramsey	West Germany; Italy	Sea adventure
Black Gold	Leslie H. Martinson	Philip Carey, Diane McBain, James Best, Claude Akins	United States	
Brushfire	Jack Warner Jr.	John Ireland, Everett Sloane, Carl Esmond, Jo Morrow	United States	
Il capitano di ferro	Sergio Grieco	Gustavo Rojo, Barbara Steele	Italy; Yugoslavia	
Captain Clegg	Peter Graham Scott	Peter Cushing	United Kingdom	
Carry On Jack	Gerald Thomas	Kenneth Williams, Bernard Cribbins, Juliet Mills, Charles Hawtrey, Donald Houston, Cecil Parker	United Kingdom	Adventure comedy, sea adventure
Cartouche	Philippe de Broca	Jean-Paul Belmondo, Claudia Cardinale, Jean Rochefort, Jess Hahn, Marcel Dalio, Odile Versois	France; Italy	Romantic adventure
Charge of the Black Lancers	Giacomo Gentilomo	Mel Ferrer, Yvonne Furneaux, Letícia Román	Italy; France	
Le Chevalier de Pardaillan	Bernard Borderie	Gérard Barray, Gianna Maria Canale, Philippe Lemaire	France; Italy	
Commando	Frank Wisbar	Stewart Granger, Dorian Gray	Italy; West Germany; Spain	War adventure
Confessions of an Opium Eater	Albert Zugsmith	Vincent Price	United States	
Congo vivo	Giuseppe Bennati	Jean Seberg, Gabriele Ferzetti, Carla Bizzari	France; Italy	
Damon and Pythias	Curtis Bernhardt	Guy Williams, Don Burnett, Arnoldo Foà	United States; Italy	
Dangerous Charter	Robert Gottschalk	Chris Warfield, Sally Fraser, Peter Forster	United States	Sea adventure
Daughter of the Sun God	Kenneth Herts	William Holmes, Lisa Montell	United States	
Dr. No	Terence Young	Sean Connery, Ursula Andress, Joseph Wiseman, Jack Lord	United Kingdom	Spy film, first theatrical adaptation of the James Bond film series
I due della legione	Lucio Fulci	Franco and Ciccio	Italy	Adventure comedy
Duel of Fire	Umberto Lenzi	Fernando Lamas, Liana Orfei, Lisa Gastoni	Italy	
Escape from Zahrain	Ronald Neame	Yul Brynner, Sal Mineo	United States	
Five Weeks in a Balloon	Irwin Allen	Red Buttons, Fabian, Barbara Eden, Cedric Hardwicke, Peter Lorre	United States	
Flight from Singapore	Dudley Birch	Patrick Allen, Patrick Holt, William Abney	United Kingdom	
Freddy and the Song of the South Pacific	Werner Jacobs	Freddy Quinn, Jacqueline Sassard, Ralf Wolter, Albert Lieven	United States	Sea adventure, musical
The Girls of La Rochelle	Bernard Deflandre	Geneviève Cluny, Philippe Lemaire	France	
The Golden Arrow	Antonio Margheriti	Tab Hunter, Rossana Podestà	Italy	
Guns of Darkness	Anthony Asquith	Leslie Caron, David Niven	United Kingdom	
H.M.S. Defiant	Lewis Gilbert	Alec Guinness, Dirk Bogarde, Anthony Quayle	United Kingdom	Adventure drama, sea adventure
Hatari!	Howard Hawks	John Wayne, Hardy Krüger, Elsa Martinelli, Red Buttons, Gérard Blain, Michèle Girardon, Bruce Cabot	United States	Romantic adventure, adventure comedy
Hawk of the Caribbean	Piero Regnoli	Johnny Desmond, Yvonne Monlaur	Italy	Pirate film
Hemingway's Adventures of a Young Man	Martin Ritt	Richard Beymer, Susan Strasberg, Diane Baker, Eli Wallach, Ricardo Montalbán, Paul Newman	United States	
Hero's Island	Leslie Stevens	James Mason, Neville Brand, Kate Manx	United States	
His Best Friend	Luis Trenker	Toni Sailer, Dietmar Schönherr	West Germany	Mountaineering adventure
Hussar Ballad	Eldar Ryazanov	Larisa Golubkina, Yury Yakovlev	Soviet Union	Adventure comedy, musical
In Search of the Castaways	Robert Stevenson	Maurice Chevalier, Hayley Mills, George Sanders, Wilfrid Hyde-White	United Kingdom; United States	Family-oriented adventure, sea adventure
Invasion 1700	Fernando Cerchio	Jeanne Crain, Pierre Brice, John Drew Barrymore, Akim Tamiroff, Gordon Mitchell	Italy; France	
The Italian Brigands	Mario Camerini	Ernest Borgnine, Vittorio Gassman, Rosanna Schiaffino, Katy Jurado, Bernard Blier, Micheline Presle, Akim Tamiroff, Philippe Leroy	Italy; France	
Jack the Giant Killer	Nathan H. Juran	Kerwin Mathews, Judi Meredith, Torin Thatcher	United States	Fantasy adventure
Journey to the Seventh Planet	Sidney W. Pink	John Agar, Ann Smyrner	United States; Denmark	Space adventure
Kerim, Son of the Sheik	Mario Costa	Gordon Scott, Cristina Gaioni, Moira Orfei, Gordon Mitchell	Italy; France	
Konga Yo	Yves Allégret	Nicole Courcel, Jean Lefebvre, Roger Pigaut	France	
Lawrence of Arabia	David Lean	Peter O'Toole, Omar Sharif, Alec Guinness, Anthony Quinn, Jack Hawkins, José Ferrer, Claude Rains, Arthur Kennedy	United Kingdom; United States	
La leggenda di Fra Diavolo	Leopoldo Savona	Tony Russel, Haya Harareet, Mario Adorf, Amedeo Nazzari	Italy	
Lonely Are the Brave	David Miller	Kirk Douglas, Gena Rowlands, Walter Matthau, George Kennedy	United States	Western
The Magic Sword	Bert I. Gordon	Gary Lockwood, Basil Rathbone, Estelle Winwood	United States	Fantasy adventure
Mandrin	Jean-Paul Le Chanois	Georges Rivière, Dany Robin	France; Italy	
Le Masque de fer	Henri Decoin	Jean Marais, Claudine Auger, Jean-François Poron, Sylva Koscina, Jean Rochefort	France; Italy	
Musketeers of the Sea	Steno	Pier Angeli, Channing Pollock, Aldo Ray, Philippe Clay, Robert Alda	Italy; France	Sea adventure
Mutiny on the Bounty	Lewis Milestone	Marlon Brando, Trevor Howard, Richard Harris, Tarita	United States	Sea adventure, adventure drama
My Son, the Hero	Duccio Tessari	Pedro Armendáriz, Giuliano Gemma, Antonella Lualdi, Jacqueline Sassard	Italy; France	Fantasy adventure, adventure comedy
The Mysteries of Paris	André Hunebelle	Jean Marais, Dany Robin, Raymond Pellegrin, Jill Haworth	France; Italy	
Odio mortale	Franco Montemurro	Amedeo Nazzari, Danielle De Metz	Italy	
The Pirates of Blood River	John Gilling	Kerwin Mathews, Glenn Corbett, Christopher Lee	United Kingdom	Pirate film
Planeta Bur	Pavel Klushantsev	Vladimir Yemelyanov, Georgiy Zhzhonov	Soviet Union	Space adventure
The Prisoner of the Iron Mask	Francesco De Feo	Michel Lemoine, Wandisa Guida, Andrea Bosic	Italy; France	
Le Reflux	Paul Gégauff	Roger Vadim, Franco Fabrizi, Serge Marquand, Michel Subor	France	
The Road to Hong Kong	Norman Panama	Bob Hope, Bing Crosby, Joan Collins, Robert Morley, Dorothy Lamour	United Kingdom	Adventure comedy
La Salamandre d'or	Maurice Régamey	Jean-Claude Pascal, Valérie Lagrange, Madeleine Robinson, Scilla Gabel	France; Italy	
Samar	George Montgomery	George Montgomery, Gilbert Roland	United States; Philippines	
The Sand Runs Red	Ernst R. von Theumer	Hellmut Lange, Thomas Alder, Christiane Nielsen, Ellen Schwiers	West Germany	
Il sangue e la sfida	Nick Nostro	Gérard Landry, José Greci, Andrea Bosic	Italy; Spain	
Sanjuro	Akira Kurosawa	Toshirō Mifune, Yūzō Kayama, Tatsuya Nakadai	Japan	
Lo sceicco rosso	Fernando Cerchio	Channing Pollock, Mel Welles	Italy; France	
The Secret Mark of D'Artagnan	Siro Marcellini	George Nader, Magali Noël, Georges Marchal	Italy; France	
Seven Seas to Calais	Rudolph Maté	Rod Taylor, Keith Michell, Irene Worth, Edy Vessel, Mario Girotti	Italy	Sea adventure
The Seven Tasks of Ali Baba	Emimmo Salvi	Rod Flash, Bella Cortez	Italy	Fantasy adventure
The Seventh Sword	Riccardo Freda	Brett Halsey	Italy; France	
The Son of Captain Blood	Tulio Demicheli	Sean Flynn, Alessandra Panaro, John Kitzmiller, Fernando Sancho, Ann Todd	Italy; Spain; United States	Pirate film
Il Sorpasso	Dino Risi	Vittorio Gassman, Jean-Louis Trintignant, Catherine Spaak	Italy	
The Spanish Sword	Ernest Morris	Ronald Howard, June Thorburn, Nigel Green	United Kingdom	
The Spiral Road	Robert Mulligan	Rock Hudson, Burl Ives, Gena Rowlands	United States	Adventure drama
Station Six-Sahara	Seth Holt	Carroll Baker, Peter van Eyck, Hansjörg Felmy, Ian Bannen, Denholm Elliott, Mario Adorf	United Kingdom; West Germany	
Swordsman of Siena	Étienne Périer	Stewart Granger, Sylva Koscina, Christine Kaufmann	Italy; France	
The Tale of Zatoichi	Kenji Misumi	Shintaro Katsu, Masayo Banri, Ryuzo Shimada	Japan	
Taras Bulba	J. Lee Thompson	Yul Brynner, Tony Curtis, Christine Kaufmann	United States	
Tarzan Goes to India	John Guillermin	Jock Mahoney, Leo Gordon	United States; United Kingdom; Switzerland	
Terror of the Bloodhunters	Jerry Warren	Robert Clarke	United States	
Tharus Son of Attila	Roberto Bianchi Montero	Jerome Courtland, Lisa Gastoni	Italy	
Tiger of the Seven Seas	Luigi Capuano	Gianna Maria Canale, Anthony Steel, John Kitzmiller	Italy; France	Pirate film
The Triumph of Robin Hood	Umberto Lenzi	Don Burnett, Gia Scala	Italy	
I tromboni di Fra' Diavolo	Giorgio Simonelli	Francisco Rabal, Ugo Tognazzi, Raimondo Vianello	Italy; Spain	
War Gods of Babylon	Silvio Amadio	Howard Duff	Italy	
Women of Devil's Island	Domenico Paolella	Michèle Mercier, Guy Madison	Italy; France	
Zorro alla corte di Spagna	Luigi Capuano	George Ardisson	Italy	

== 1963 ==
Title	Director	Cast	Country	Subgenre/Notes
55 Days at Peking	Nicholas Ray	Charlton Heston, Ava Gardner, David Niven	United States	
The Adventures of Scaramouche	Antonio Isasi-Isasmendi	Gérard Barray, Michèle Girardon, Gianna Maria Canale	France; Spain; Italy	
Alone Across the Pacific	Kon Ichikawa	Yujiro Ishihara, Masayuki Mori, Kinuyo Tanaka, Ruriko Asaoka	Japan	Sea adventure
Atragon	Ishirō Honda	Tadao Takashima, Jun Tazaki	Japan	Science fiction adventure, sea adventure
The Bay of St Michel	John Ainsworth	Keenan Wynn, Mai Zetterling	United Kingdom	
The Beast of Babylon Against the Son of Hercules	Siro Marcellini	Gordon Scott, Geneviève Grad	Italy; France	
The Black Duke	Pino Mercanti	Cameron Mitchell	Italy; Spain	
The Black Panther of Ratana	Jürgen Roland	Heinz Drache, Marianne Koch, Horst Frank, Brad Harris, Chris Howland	West Germany; Italy; Thailand	
Brennus, Enemy of Rome	Giacomo Gentilomo	Gordon Mitchell, Massimo Serato, Tony Kendall	Italy	
Call Me Bwana	Gordon Douglas	Bob Hope, Anita Ekberg	United Kingdom	Adventure comedy
Captain Sindbad	Byron Haskin	Guy Williams, Heidi Brühl, Pedro Armendáriz	United States; West Germany	Fantasy adventure, sea adventure
The Castilian	Javier Setó	Espartaco Santoni, Broderick Crawford, Cesar Romero, Frankie Avalon, Fernando Rey, Alida Valli	Spain; United States	
La cieca di Sorrento	Nick Nostro	Diana Martín, Anthony Steffen	Italy; Spain	
Los conquistadores del Pacífico	José María Elorrieta	Frank Latimore	Spain	Sea adventure
Daggers Drawn	Charles Gérard	Françoise Arnoul, Petula Clark, Marcel Dalio, Pierre Mondy	France	Sea adventure
Death Drums Along the River	Lawrence Huntington	Richard Todd, Marianne Koch, Albert Lieven, Walter Rilla, Vivi Bach	United Kingdom; West Germany; South Africa	
I diavoli di Spartivento	Leopoldo Savona	John Drew Barrymore, Scilla Gabel	Italy	
Donovan's Reef	John Ford	John Wayne, Lee Marvin, Elizabeth Allen, Jack Warden, Cesar Romero, Dorothy Lamour	United States	
Dronningens vagtmester	Johan Jacobsen	Poul Reichhardt, Jens Østerholm, Birgitte Federspiel, Vivi Bach, Ghita Nørby	Denmark	
Drums of Africa	James B. Clark	Frankie Avalon, Mariette Hartley, Lloyd Bochner	United States	
Duel at the Rio Grande	Mario Caiano	Sean Flynn, Folco Lulli	Italy; Spain; France	Western
Escape from Hell Island	Mark Stevens	Mark Stevens, Jack Donner, Linda Gaye Scott	United States	Sea adventure
The Executioner of Venice	Luigi Capuano	Lex Barker, Guy Madison	Italy	
Flipper	James B. Clark	Chuck Connors, Luke Halpin, Kathleen Maguire	United States	Sea adventure, Family-oriented adventure
The Four Musketeers	Carlo Ludovico Bragaglia	Aldo Fabrizi, Peppino De Filippo, Lisa Gastoni, Georges Rivière	Italy; France	Adventure comedy
From Russia with Love	Terence Young	Sean Connery, Daniela Bianchi, Robert Shaw, Lotte Lenya	United Kingdom	Spy film
Gladiators Seven	Alberto De Martino, Pedro Lazaga	Richard Harrison, Loredana Nusciak, Livio Lorenzon	Italy; Spain	
Gold for the Caesars	Andre DeToth	Jeffrey Hunter, Mylène Demongeot	Italy; France	
The Great Escape	John Sturges	Steve McQueen, James Garner, Richard Attenborough, Charles Bronson, James Coburn, James Donald, Donald Pleasence	United States	War adventure
Harbor Lights	Maury Dexter	Kent Taylor, Míriam Colón, Jeff Morrow	United States	Sea adventure
Hercules Against the Mongols	Domenico Paolella	Mark Forest, Ken Clark	Italy	
The Incredible Journey	Fletcher Markle	Émile Genest, John Drainie, Tommy Tweed	United States	Family-oriented adventure
The Invincible Masked Rider	Umberto Lenzi	Pierre Brice, Hélène Chanel, Daniele Vargas	Italy; France	
It's a Mad, Mad, Mad, Mad World	Stanley Kramer	Spencer Tracy, Edie Adams, Milton Berle, Sid Caesar, Jimmy Durante, Buddy Hackett, Ethel Merman, Dorothy Provine, Mickey Rooney, Dick Shawn, Phil Silvers, Terry-Thomas, Jonathan Winters	United States	Adventure comedy
Jason and the Argonauts	Don Chaffey	Todd Armstrong, Nancy Kovack, Gary Raymond, Nigel Green, Honor Blackman	United Kingdom; United States	Fantasy adventure, sea adventure
Kali Yug: Goddess of Vengeance	Mario Camerini	Paul Guers, Lex Barker, Senta Berger, Klaus Kinski, Claudine Auger	Italy; West Germany; France	
Kings of the Sun	J. Lee Thompson	Yul Brynner, George Chakiris, Shirley Anne Field, Richard Basehart	United States	
Knights of Terror	Mario Costa	Tony Russel, Scilla Gabel	Italy; France; Spain	
Lancelot and Guinevere	Cornel Wilde	Cornel Wilde, Jean Wallace, Brian Aherne	United Kingdom; United States	Romantic adventure
The Lion of St. Mark	Luigi Capuano	Gordon Scott, Gianna Maria Canale, Rik Battaglia	Italy	
Lord of the Flies	Peter Brook	James Aubrey, Tom Chapin, Hugh Edwards	United Kingdom	Adventure drama
The Lost World of Sinbad	Senkichi Taniguchi	Toshiro Mifune, Mie Hama, Akiko Wakabayashi	Japan	Sea adventure
Magnet of Doom	Jean-Pierre Melville	Jean-Paul Belmondo, Charles Vanel, Michèle Mercier, Stefania Sandrelli	France; Italy	
The Magnificent Adventurer	Riccardo Freda	Brett Halsey, Françoise Fabian, Claudia Mori, Bernard Blier	Italy; France; Spain	
Mathias Sandorf	Georges Lampin	Louis Jourdan, Francisco Rabal, Serena Vergano, Bernard Blier	France; Spain; Italy	
The Mystery of the Indian Temple	Mario Camerini	Paul Guers, Lex Barker, Senta Berger, Klaus Kinski, Claudine Auger	Italy; West Germany; France	
The Pink Panther	Blake Edwards	David Niven, Peter Sellers, Robert Wagner	United States	
Il pirata del diavolo	Roberto Mauri	Richard Harrison	Italy; Yugoslavia	
Rampage	Phil Karlson	Robert Mitchum, Jack Hawkins, Elsa Martinelli, Sabu	United States	
Rat Trap	Jean-Gabriel Albicocco	Charles Aznavour, Marie Laforêt	France; Italy	
River of Evil	Helmuth M. Backhaus, Franz Eichhorn	Barbara Rütting, Harald Leipnitz	West Germany; Brazil	
Rocambole	Bernard Borderie	Channing Pollock, Edy Vessel, Nadia Gray, Rik Battaglia	France; Italy	
Saladin the Victorious	Youssef Chahine	Ahmed Mazhar, Hamdi Geiss, Leila Fawzi, Nadia Lutfi, Salah Zulfikar, Tewfik El Dekn, Omar El-Hariri, Mahmoud el-Meliguy	Egypt	
Sammy Going South	Alexander Mackendrick	Fergus McClelland, Edward G. Robinson	United Kingdom	
Sandokan the Great	Umberto Lenzi	Steve Reeves	Italy; France; Spain	
Savage Sam	Norman Tokar	Brian Keith, Tommy Kirk, Dewey Martin	United States	Adventure drama
The Scarecrow of Romney Marsh	James Neilson	Patrick McGoohan	United States	
The Scarlet Blade	John Gilling	Jack Hedley, Lionel Jeffries, Oliver Reed	United Kingdom	
Shéhérazade	Pierre Gaspard-Huit	Anna Karina, Gérard Barray, Giuliano Gemma	France; Italy; Spain	
The Sign of the Coyote	Mario Caiano	Fernando Casanova	Italy; Spain	Western
Siege of the Saxons	Nathan H. Juran	Janette Scott, Ronald Lewis	United Kingdom	
Slave Queen of Babylon	Primo Zeglio	Yvonne Furneaux, John Ericson, Renzo Ricci	Italy	
South of Tana River	Bent Christensen, Sven Methling, Henry Geddes	Charlotte Ernst, Axel Strøbye, Poul Reichhardt	Denmark	
Storm Over Ceylon	Gerd Oswald	Lex Barker, Maurice Ronet, Magali Noël, Eleonora Rossi Drago, Ann Smyrner	West Germany; Italy; France	
The Sword in the Stone	Wolfgang Reitherman		United States	Animated film, family-oriented adventure, fantasy adventure
Tarzan's Three Challenges	Robert Day	Jock Mahoney, Woody Strode	United States; United Kingdom	
Thunder Island	Jack Leewood	Gene Nelson, Fay Spain, Brian Kelly	United States	Sea adventure
Tom Jones	Tony Richardson	Albert Finney, Susannah York, Hugh Griffith, Edith Evans, Joan Greenwood, Diane Cilento, Joyce Redman	United Kingdom	
Le tre spade di Zorro	Ricardo Blasco	Guy Stockwell	Italy; Spain	Western
The Tyrant of Castile	Ferdinando Baldi	Mark Damon	Italy; Spain	
Voyage to the End of the Universe	Jindrich Polák	Zdeněk Štěpánek, František Smolík, Dana Medřická	Czechoslovakia	Space adventure
Zorro and the Three Musketeers	Luigi Capuano	Gordon Scott	Italy	
Zorro contro Maciste	Umberto Lenzi	Pierre Brice, Alan Steel, Moira Orfei, Maria Grazia Spina	Italy	

== 1964 ==
Title	Director	Cast	Country	Subgenre/Notes
3 Avengers	Gianfranco Parolini	Alan Steel	Italy	
The 7th Dawn	Lewis Gilbert	William Holden, Capucine, Tetsuro Tamba, Susannah York	United Kingdom	
100 Horsemen	Vittorio Cottafavi	Mark Damon, Antonella Lualdi, Gastone Moschin, Wolfgang Preiss	Italy; Spain; West Germany	
Adventures of the Bengal Lancers	Umberto Lenzi	Richard Harrison	Italy; Spain	
Ali Baba and the Seven Saracens	Emimmo Salvi	Gordon Mitchell, Dan Harrison, Bella Cortez, Carla Calò	Italy	Fantasy adventure
Angélique, Marquise des Anges	Bernard Borderie	Michèle Mercier, Robert Hossein, Jean Rochefort, Giuliano Gemma	France; Italy; West Germany	Romantic adventure
The Avenger of Venice	Carlo Campogalliani, Piero Pierotti	Brett Halsey, Gianna Maria Canale	Italy; Spain; France	
Backfire	Jean Becker	Jean-Paul Belmondo, Jean Seberg, Gert Fröbe, Fernando Rey, Jean-Pierre Marielle, Enrico Maria Salerno, Wolfgang Preiss, Fernando Sancho	France; Spain; Italy; West Germany	
The Black Tulip	Christian-Jaque	Alain Delon, Dawn Addams, Virna Lisi, Akim Tamiroff	France; Italy; Spain	
Cyrano et d'Artagnan	Abel Gance, Nelly Kaplan	José Ferrer, Jean-Pierre Cassel, Sylva Koscina, Daliah Lavi, Michel Simon, Philippe Noiret	France; Italy; Spain	Romantic adventure
Desert Raiders	Tanio Boccia	Kirk Morris, Rosalba Neri, Hélène Chanel	Italy	
Devil of the Desert Against the Son of Hercules	Antonio Margheriti	Kirk Morris, Michèle Girardon	Italy	
The Devil-Ship Pirates	Don Sharp	Christopher Lee, John Cairney, Barry Warren, Andrew Keir	United Kingdom	Pirate film
East of Sudan	Nathan H. Juran	Anthony Quayle, Sylvia Syms, Jenny Agutter	United Kingdom	
The Fall of the Roman Empire	Anthony Mann	Sophia Loren, Stephen Boyd, Alec Guinness, James Mason, Christopher Plummer	United States	
Father Goose	Ralph Nelson	Cary Grant, Leslie Caron, Trevor Howard	United States	Adventure comedy, war adventure
First Men in the Moon	Nathan H. Juran	Edward Judd, Martha Hyer, Lionel Jeffries	United Kingdom	Space adventure
Flight from Ashiya	Michael Anderson	Yul Brynner, Richard Widmark, George Chakiris	United States	
Flight to Fury	Monte Hellman	Dewey Martin, Jack Nicholson, Fay Spain, Vic Díaz	United States; Philippines	
Flipper's New Adventure	Leon Benson	Luke Halpin, Pamela Franklin, Helen Cherry	United States	Sea adventure, family-oriented adventure
Follow Me, Scoundrels	Ralf Kirsten	Manfred Krug	East Germany	Adventure comedy
From Hell to Borneo	George Montgomery	George Montgomery	United States	
Gentlemen of the Night	Pino Mercanti	Guy Madison, Lisa Gastoni, Ingrid Schoeller, Gastone Moschin	Italy; France	
Giants of Rome	Antonio Margheriti	Richard Harrison	Italy; France	
Golden Goddess of Rio Beni	Eugenio Martín, Franz Eichhorn	Pierre Brice, Gillian Hills, Harald Juhnke, René Deltgen	West Germany; France; Spain; Brazil	
Goldfinger	Guy Hamilton	Sean Connery, Honor Blackman, Gert Fröbe, Shirley Eaton, Harold Sakata	United Kingdom	Spy film
Goliath and the Sins of Babylon	Michele Lupo	Eleanora Bianchi, Erno Crisa, Mark Forest	Italy	
Greed in the Sun	Henri Verneuil	Jean-Paul Belmondo, Lino Ventura, Reginald Kernan, Gert Fröbe, Bernard Blier, Andréa Parisy	France; Italy	Adventure comedy
Hardi Pardaillan!	Bernard Borderie	Gérard Barray, Valérie Lagrange, Philippe Lemaire	France; Italy	
Hercules Against the Moon Men	Giacomo Gentilomo	Sergio Ciani	Italy; France	
Hercules and the Tyrants of Babylon	Domenico Paolella	Rock Stevens	Italy	
Hey There, It's Yogi Bear!	Joseph Barbera, William Hanna	Daws Butler (voice), Don Messick (voice), Julie Bennett (voice), Mel Blanc (voice)	United States	Animated film, family-oriented adventure
Island of the Blue Dolphins	James B. Clark	Celia Kaye	United States	
A Jester's Tale	Karel Zeman	Petr Kostka, Emília Vášáryová	Czechoslovakia	
Kidnapped to Mystery Island	Luigi Capuano	Guy Madison, Peter van Eyck, Ingeborg Schöner, Ivan Desny	Italy; West Germany	
Lana, Queen of the Amazons	Géza von Cziffra, Cyl Farney	Catherine Schell, Anton Diffring, Michael Hinz, Christian Wolff	West Germany; Brazil	
Last Plane to Baalbek	Marcello Giannini, Hugo Fregonese	Rossana Podestà, Jacques Sernas, George Sanders, Folco Lulli, Yoko Tani	Italy; France; Lebanon	
The Long Ships	Jack Cardiff	Richard Widmark, Sidney Poitier, Rosanna Schiaffino, Russ Tamblyn, Oskar Homolka	United Kingdom; Yugoslavia	Sea adventure
Maciste in King Solomon's Mines	Piero Regnoli	Reg Park, Wandisa Guida	Italy	
The Masked Man Against the Pirates	Vertunnio De Angelis	George Hilton, Tony Kendall	Italy	Pirate film
Mission to Hell	Gianfranco Parolini	Paul Hubschmid, Marianne Hold, Horst Frank, Brad Harris	Italy; West Germany; France	
The Moon-Spinners	James Neilson	Hayley Mills, Peter McEnery, Eli Wallach, Irene Papas, Pola Negri	United States	
Les Parias de la gloire	Henri Decoin	Curd Jürgens, Maurice Ronet, Folco Lulli	France; Italy; Spain	War adventure
Pirates of Malaysia	Umberto Lenzi	Steve Reeves	Italy; France; Spain	
Revenge of the Musketeers	Fulvio Tului	Fernando Lamas, Gloria Milland, Walter Barnes	Italy	
Revolt of the Barbarians	Guido Malatesta	Roland Carey, Maria Grazia Spina	Italy	
Rhino!	Ivan Tors	Harry Guardino, Shirley Eaton, Robert Culp	United States	
Il ribelle di Castelmonte	Vertunnio De Angelis	Gérard Landry, Annie Alberti, John Kitzmiller	Italy	
Robinson Crusoe on Mars	Byron Haskin	Paul Mantee, Victor Lundin, Adam West	United States	Space adventure
Samson vs. the Giant King	Tanio Boccia	Kirk Morris, Massimo Serato	Italy	
Sandokan Against the Leopard of Sarawak	Luigi Capuano	Ray Danton, Guy Madison	Italy; West Germany	
Sandokan to the Rescue	Luigi Capuano	Ray Danton, Guy Madison	Italy; West Germany	
Santa Claus Conquers the Martians	Nicholas Webster	John Call, Leonard Hicks, Vincent Beck	United States	Family-oriented adventure
Der Satan mit den roten Haaren	Alfons Stummer	Helga Sommerfeld, Helmut Schmid, Ellen Schwiers	West Germany	
The Secret of Blood Island	Quentin Lawrence	Jack Hedley, Barbara Shelley, Patrick Wymark, Charles Tingwell	United Kingdom; United States	War adventure
Secret of the Sphinx	Duccio Tessari	Tony Russel, Maria Perschy, Ivan Desny	Italy	
The Shoot	Robert Siodmak	Lex Barker, Marie Versini	West Germany; France; Italy; Yugoslavia	
Temple of the White Elephant	Umberto Lenzi	Sean Flynn, Marie Versini	Italy; France	
Terror of the Steppes	Tanio Boccia	Kirk Morris, Moira Orfei	Italy	
That Man from Rio	Philippe de Broca	Jean-Paul Belmondo, Françoise Dorléac, Jean Servais, Adolfo Celi	France; Italy	Adventure comedy
The Thief of Damascus	Mario Amendola	Tony Russel	Italy	
Tintin and the Blue Oranges	Philippe Condroyer	Jean-Pierre Talbot, Jean Bouise	France	Family-oriented adventure
Topkapi	Jules Dassin	Melina Mercouri, Peter Ustinov, Maximilian Schell, Robert Morley, Akim Tamiroff	United States	
Toto vs. the Black Pirate	Fernando Cerchio	Totò	Italy	Adventure comedy, pirate film
The Train	John Frankenheimer	Burt Lancaster, Paul Scofield, Jeanne Moreau, Michel Simon	United States; France; Italy	War adventure
The Triumph of Hercules	Alberto De Martino	Dan Vadis, Marilù Tolo, Moira Orfei	Italy; France	
The Truth About Spring	Richard Thorpe	Hayley Mills, James MacArthur, John Mills	United States	Sea adventure, romantic adventure
Weeping for a Bandit	Carlos Saura	Francisco Rabal, Lea Massari, Lino Ventura, Philippe Leroy	Spain; France; Italy	Adventure drama
Zorba the Greek	Michael Cacoyannis	Anthony Quinn, Alan Bates, Irene Papas	United States; Greece; United Kingdom	
Zulu	Cy Endfield	Stanley Baker, Michael Caine, Jack Hawkins	United States; United Kingdom	

== 1965 ==
Title	Director	Cast	Country	Subgenre/Notes
13 Days to Die	Manfred R. Köhler	Thomas Alder, Horst Frank, Chitra Ratana, Peter Carsten, Serge Nubret	West Germany; Italy; France	
The Adventurer of Tortuga	Luigi Capuano	Guy Madison, Ingeborg Schöner, Rik Battaglia	Italy; West Germany	Pirate film
The Amorous Adventures of Moll Flanders	Terence Young	Kim Novak, Richard Johnson, Angela Lansbury	United Kingdom	Adventure comedy
Angelique and the King	Bernard Borderie	Michèle Mercier, Robert Hossein, Sami Frey, Jean Rochefort	France; Italy; West Germany	Romantic adventure
The Bedford Incident	James B. Harris	Richard Widmark, Sidney Poitier, James MacArthur, Martin Balsam, Eric Portman, Donald Sutherland	United States	Sea adventure
Behind the Mask of Zorro	Ricardo Blasco	Tony Russel	Spain; Italy	Western
The Brigand of Kandahar	John Gilling	Ronald Lewis, Oliver Reed, Yvonne Romain	United Kingdom	
Captain from Toledo	Eugenio Martín	Stephen Forsyth, Ann Smyrner, Norma Bengell, Ivan Desny, Carl Möhner	Spain; Italy; West Germany	
City Under the Sea	Jacques Tourneur	Vincent Price, Tab Hunter, Susan Hart, David Tomlinson	United Kingdom; United States	Sea adventure, science fiction adventure
Coast of Skeletons	Robert Lynn	Richard Todd, Marianne Koch, Dale Robertson, Heinz Drache, Elga Andersen, Dietmar Schönherr	United Kingdom; South Africa	Sea adventure
Curse of Simba	Lindsay Shonteff	Bryant Haliday, Dennis Price, Lisa Daniely	United Kingdom	Horror adventure
The Desert Renegades	Paolo Heusch, Antonio Santillán	Robert Hoffmann, Marilù Tolo	Italy; Spain; Egypt	
Diamond Walkers	Paul Martin	Harald Leipnitz, Joachim Hansen, Marisa Mell, Ann Smyrner	South Africa; West Germany	
The Dictator's Guns	Claude Sautet	Lino Ventura, Sylva Koscina, Leo Gordon	France	Sea adventure
Doctor Zhivago	David Lean	Omar Sharif, Julie Christie, Geraldine Chaplin, Rod Steiger, Alec Guinness, Tom Courtenay, Rita Tushingham, Siobhán McKenna, Ralph Richardson	United States; Italy; United Kingdom	Romantic adventure, adventure drama
Erik, the Viking	Mario Caiano	Giuliano Gemma, Gordon Mitchell	Italy	Sea adventure
The Flight of the Phoenix	Robert Aldrich	James Stewart, Hardy Krüger, Richard Attenborough, Peter Finch, Ernest Borgnine	United States	Adventure drama
Genghis Khan	Henry Levin	Omar Sharif, Stephen Boyd, James Mason, Eli Wallach, Françoise Dorléac, Telly Savalas, Robert Morley, Woody Strode, Yvonne Mitchell, Michael Hordern	United Kingdom; Yugoslavia	
Goliath at the Conquest of Damascus	Domenico Paolella	Rock Stevens	Italy	
The Great Race	Blake Edwards	Tony Curtis, Jack Lemmon, Natalie Wood, Peter Falk	United States	Adventure comedy
Här kommer bärsärkarna	Arne Mattsson	Carl-Gustaf Lindstedt, Dirch Passer, Loredana Nusciak, Walter Chiari	Sweden	Adventure comedy
Harum Scarum	Gene Nelson	Elvis Presley	United States	Musical
Help!	Richard Lester	The Beatles	United Kingdom	Musical, adventure comedy
The Heroes of Telemark	Anthony Mann	Kirk Douglas, Richard Harris, Ulla Jacobsson, Michael Redgrave	United Kingdom	War adventure
A High Wind in Jamaica	Alexander Mackendrick	Anthony Quinn, James Coburn, Dennis Price	United Kingdom; United States	Pirate film, adventure drama
Jungle Adventurer	Umberto Lenzi	Richard Harrison	Italy	
Kingdom of the Silver Lion	Franz Josef Gottlieb	Lex Barker, Marie Versini	West Germany; Spain	
The Lace Wars	René Clair	Jean-Pierre Cassel, Marie Dubois	France	
Lady L	Peter Ustinov	Sophia Loren, Paul Newman, David Niven, Claude Dauphin, Philippe Noiret, Michel Piccoli, Marcel Dalio, Cecil Parker, Peter Ustinov	United Kingdom; France; Italy	
Legacy of the Incas	Georg Marischka	Guy Madison, Fernando Rey, Francisco Rabal, Heinz Erhardt	West Germany; Bulgaria; Spain; Italy	Western
Die letzten Drei der Albatros	Wolfgang Becker	Joachim Hansen, Harald Juhnke, Horst Frank	West Germany	Sea adventure, war adventure
Lord Jim	Richard Brooks	Peter O'Toole, James Mason, Curd Jürgens, Eli Wallach, Daliah Lavi, Jack Hawkins, Paul Lukas, Akim Tamiroff	United Kingdom; United States	Adventure drama, sea adventure
La magnifica sfida	Miguel Lluch	Kirk Morris	Italy; Spain	
Man from Cocody	Christian-Jaque	Jean Marais, Liselotte Pulver	France	
Mara of the Wilderness	Frank McDonald	Lori Saunders, Adam West	United States	
Marco the Magnificent	Denys de La Patellière	Horst Buchholz, Anthony Quinn, Omar Sharif, Orson Welles, Elsa Martinelli, Akim Tamiroff, Robert Hossein, Massimo Girotti, Folco Lulli, Bruno Cremer	Italy; France	
Marvelous Angelique	Bernard Borderie	Michèle Mercier, Jean-Louis Trintignant, Jean Rochefort, Giuliano Gemma	France; Italy; West Germany	Romantic adventure
Masquerade	Basil Dearden	Cliff Robertson, Jack Hawkins, Marisa Mell, Michel Piccoli	United Kingdom	
Mister Moses	Ronald Neame	Robert Mitchum, Carroll Baker	United States	
Mozambique	Robert Lynn	Steve Cochran, Hildegard Knef, Paul Hubschmid, Vivi Bach, Dietmar Schönherr	United Kingdom	
The Naked Prey	Cornel Wilde	Cornel Wilde	United States	
Neamul Șoimăreștilor	Mircea Drăgan	Ștefan Ciubotărașu, Colea Răutu, Dina Cocea	Romania	
Pinocchio in Outer Space	Ray Goossens		Belgium; United States	Animated film, family-oriented adventure, space adventure
Planet of the Vampires	Mario Bava	Barry Sullivan, Norma Bengell, Ángel Aranda	Italy; Spain	Space adventure, horror
I predoni del Sahara	Guido Malatesta	George Mikell, Pamela Tudor	Italy	
The Pyramid of the Sun God	Robert Siodmak	Lex Barker, Michèle Girardon, Gérard Barray, Hans Nielsen, Rik Battaglia, Gustavo Rojo, Ralf Wolter	West Germany; France; Italy	Western
The Revenge of Ivanhoe	Tanio Boccia	Clyde Rogers	Italy	
The Reward	Serge Bourguignon	Max von Sydow, Yvette Mimieux, Efrem Zimbalist Jr., Gilbert Roland, Henry Silva, Emilio Fernández	United States	Western
Ride the High Wind	David Millin	Darren McGavin, Maria Perschy, Albert Lieven	South Africa	
Sands of the Kalahari	Cy Endfield	Stuart Whitman, Stanley Baker, Susannah York	United Kingdom	
The Saragossa Manuscript	Wojciech Jerzy Has	Zbigniew Cybulski	Poland	Fantasy adventure
She	Robert Day	Ursula Andress, Peter Cushing, John Richardson, Christopher Lee	United Kingdom	
That Man in Istanbul	Antonio Isasi-Isasmendi	Horst Buchholz, Sylva Koscina, Mario Adorf, Klaus Kinski	Spain; Italy; France	
Those Magnificent Men in their Flying Machines	Ken Annakin	Stuart Whitman, Sarah Miles, James Fox, Terry-Thomas, Robert Morley, Gert Fröbe, Alberto Sordi, Jean-Pierre Cassel	United States; United Kingdom	Romantic adventure, adventure comedy
Thunderball	Terence Young	Sean Connery, Claudine Auger, Adolfo Celi, Luciana Paluzzi	United Kingdom	Spy film, sea adventure
The Treasure of the Aztecs	Robert Siodmak	Lex Barker, Michèle Girardon, Gérard Barray, Hans Nielsen, Rik Battaglia, Gustavo Rojo, Ralf Wolter	West Germany; France; Italy	Western
Up to His Ears	Philippe de Broca	Jean-Paul Belmondo, Ursula Andress, Jean Rochefort	France; Italy	Adventure comedy, romantic adventure
The Vine Bridge	Sven Nykvist	Harriet Andersson, Jack Fjeldstad, Folke Sundquist, Mai Zetterling	Sweden	
Viva Maria!	Louis Malle	Brigitte Bardot, Jeanne Moreau, George Hamilton	France; Italy	Adventure comedy, western
Von Ryan's Express	Mark Robson	Frank Sinatra, Trevor Howard	United States	War adventure
Voyage to the Prehistoric Planet	John Sebastian	Basil Rathbone, Faith Domergue	United States	Space adventure
The War Lord	Franklin J. Schaffner	Charlton Heston, Rosemary Forsyth, Richard Boone, Guy Stockwell	United States	
Where the Spies Are	Val Guest	David Niven, Françoise Dorléac, John Le Mesurier, Cyril Cusack	United Kingdom	
Wild Kurdistan	Franz Josef Gottlieb	Lex Barker, Marie Versini	West Germany; Spain	

== 1966 ==
Title	Director	Cast	Country	Subgenre/Notes
7 Women	John Ford	Anne Bancroft, Sue Lyon, Margaret Leighton, Flora Robson, Mildred Dunnock, Betty Field, Anna Lee	United States	
L'armata Brancaleone	Mario Monicelli	Vittorio Gassman, Catherine Spaak, Gian Maria Volonté	Italy; France	Adventure comedy
Ambush Bay	Ron Winston	Hugh O'Brian, Mickey Rooney, James Mitchum	United States	War adventure
Arabesque	Stanley Donen	Gregory Peck, Sophia Loren, Alan Badel	United States	Thriller
Around the World Under the Sea	Andrew Marton	Lloyd Bridges, Shirley Eaton, Brian Kelly, David McCallum	United States	Sea adventure
Assault on a Queen	Jack Donohue	Frank Sinatra, Virna Lisi, Anthony Franciosa, Alf Kjellin, Richard Conte	United States	Sea adventure
Batman	Leslie H. Martinson	Adam West, Burt Ward, Lee Meriwether, Cesar Romero, Burgess Meredith, Frank Gorshin	United States	Superhero comedy
Beau Geste	Douglas Heyes	Guy Stockwell, Doug McClure, Telly Savalas	United States	
Black Sun	Denys de La Patellière	Michèle Mercier, Daniel Gélin, Valentina Cortese	France; Italy	Adventure drama
The Blue Max	John Guillermin	George Peppard, James Mason, Ursula Andress, Jeremy Kemp, Karl Michael Vogler, Anton Diffring	United Kingdom	War adventure
Born Free	James Hill	Virginia McKenna, Bill Travers	United Kingdom	Family-oriented adventure
Davy Jones' Locker	Frederic Goode	Anthony Bate	United Kingdom	Sea adventure, family-oriented adventure
Don't Lose Your Head	Gerald Thomas	Sid James, Kenneth Williams, Dany Robin, Jim Dale, Charles Hawtrey, Joan Sims	United Kingdom	Adventure comedy
The Drums of Tabu	Javier Setó	James Philbrook, Seyna Seyn	Spain; Italy	Sea adventure
I due sanculotti	Giorgio Simonelli	Franco and Ciccio	Italy	Adventure comedy
Fantastic Voyage	Richard Fleischer	Stephen Boyd, Raquel Welch, Donald Pleasence, Edmond O'Brien	United States	Science fiction adventure
The Fighting Prince of Donegal	Michael O'Herlihy	Peter McEnery, Susan Hampshire	United States	
La Grande Vadrouille	Gérard Oury	Bourvil, Louis de Funès, Terry-Thomas	France; United Kingdom	Adventure comedy, war adventure
Haiducii	Dinu Cocea	Ion Besoiu, Marga Barbu, Amza Pellea	Romania	
Hawaii	George Roy Hill	Julie Andrews, Max von Sydow, Richard Harris, Gene Hackman, Carroll O'Connor	United States	
Khartoum	Basil Dearden	Charlton Heston, Laurence Olivier, Richard Johnson, Ralph Richardson	United Kingdom	
Knives of the Avenger	Mario Bava	Cameron Mitchell	Italy; France	
Lost Command	Mark Robson	Anthony Quinn, Alain Delon, Claudia Cardinale, George Segal, Michèle Morgan, Maurice Ronet, Jean Servais	United States	War adventure
Lt. Robin Crusoe, U.S.N.	Byron Paul	Dick Van Dyke, Nancy Kwan, Akim Tamiroff	United States	Adventure comedy
Madamigella di Maupin	Mauro Bolognini	Catherine Spaak, Robert Hossein, Tomas Milian	France; Italy; Spain	
The Man Who Laughs	Sergio Corbucci	Jean Sorel, Lisa Gastoni, Edmund Purdom	Italy; France	
Maya	John Berry	Clint Walker, Jay North, Sajid Khan	United States	Family-oriented adventure
Missione sabbie roventi	Alfonso Brescia	Howard Ross	Italy; Spain	
Namu, the Killer Whale	László Benedek	Robert Lansing	United States	Family-oriented adventure, sea adventure
Die Nibelungen	Harald Reinl	Uwe Beyer, Karin Dor, Herbert Lom, Maria Marlow, Siegfried Wischnewski, Rolf Henniger, Mario Girotti, Hans von Borsody	West Germany	Fantasy adventure
The Night of the Grizzly	Joseph Pevney	Clint Walker, Martha Hyer, Keenan Wynn, Nancy Kulp	United States	Western
One Million Years B.C.	Don Chaffey	Raquel Welch, John Richardson, Percy Herbert	United Kingdom; United States	
Our Man in Marrakesh	Don Sharp	Tony Randall, Senta Berger, Herbert Lom, Klaus Kinski, Terry-Thomas	United Kingdom	Spy film, adventure comedy
The Professionals	Richard Brooks	Burt Lancaster, Lee Marvin, Claudia Cardinale, Jack Palance, Woody Strode, Robert Ryan	United States	Western
Proud Little Ship	Viktor Bordzilovsky	Nikolay Litvinov (narrator)	Soviet Union	
Rose rosse per Angelica	Steno	Jacques Perrin, Michèle Girardon, Raffaella Carrà	Italy; France	
The Sand Pebbles	Robert Wise	Steve McQueen, Richard Attenborough, Candice Bergen, Richard Crenna	United States	Romantic adventure, war adventure
Savage Pampas	Hugo Fregonese	Robert Taylor, Ron Randell, Marc Lawrence, Ty Hardin, Rosenda Monteros	Argentina; United States; Spain	
The Sea Pirate	Sergio Bergonzelli, Roy Rowland	Gérard Barray, Antonella Lualdi	France; Italy; Spain	Sea adventure
The Stolen Airship	Karel Zeman	Míša Pospíšil, Hanuš Bor, Jan Čížek	Czechoslovakia	Family-oriented adventure
Tarzan and the Valley of Gold	Robert Day	Mike Henry	United States	
Tender Scoundrel	Jean Becker	Jean-Paul Belmondo, Stefania Sandrelli, Nadja Tiller, Mylène Demongeot, Geneviève Page, Michèle Girardon, Robert Morley, Philippe Noiret, Jean-Pierre Marielle, Marcel Dalio, Ivan Desny	France; Italy	Adventure comedy
That Man George	Jacques Deray	George Hamilton, Claudine Auger	France; Italy; Spain	
Thunderbirds Are Go	David Lane, Gerry Anderson	Sylvia Anderson (voice), Ray Barrett (voice), Alexander Davion (voice)	United Kingdom	Marionette film, space adventure, family-oriented adventure
Tonnerre sur l'océan Indien	Sergio Bergonzelli, Roy Rowland	Gérard Barray, Antonella Lualdi	France; Italy; Spain	Sea adventure
The Tough One	Joaquín Luis Romero Marchent	John Richardson, Fernando Sancho	Spain; Italy	Western
The Trap	Sidney Hayers	Oliver Reed, Rita Tushingham	United Kingdom; Canada	Adventure drama, western
Voyage to the Planet of Prehistoric Women	Derek Thomas	Mamie Van Doren, Mary Mark, Paige Lee	United States	Space adventure
War Between the Planets	Antonio Margheriti	Giacomo Rossi Stuart, Ombretta Colli	United States	Space adventure
War of the Planets	Antonio Margheriti	Tony Russel, Lisa Gastoni, Franco Nero	Italy; United States	Space adventure
Wild, Wild Planet	Antonio Margheriti	Tony Russel, Lisa Gastoni, Massimo Serato, Franco Nero	Italy; United States	Space adventure
Women of the Prehistoric Planet	Arthur C. Pierce	Wendell Corey, Keith Larsen, John Agar	United States	Space adventure
Zorro il ribelle	Piero Pierotti	Howard Ross	Italy	Western

== 1967 ==
Title	Director	Cast	Country	Subgenre/Notes
A Ghentar si muore facile	León Klimovsky	George Hilton	Italy; Spain	
Africa Texas Style	Andrew Marton	Hugh O'Brian, John Mills, Nigel Green	United Kingdom; United States	
Aladdin and His Magic Lamp	Boris Rytsarev	Boris Bystrov, Dodo Chogovadze, Andrey Fayt	Soviet Union	Family-oriented adventure, fantasy adventure
Bikini Paradise	Gregg G. Tallas	Janette Scott, Kieron Moore, John Baer	United States	Adventure comedy
Camelot	Joshua Logan	Richard Harris, Vanessa Redgrave, Franco Nero, David Hemmings	United States	Musical
Le Canard en fer blanc	Jacques Poitrenaud	Roger Hanin	France; Spain	
Caxambu!	W. Lee Wilder	John Ireland	United States; Brazil	
Cervantes	Vincent Sherman	Horst Buchholz, Gina Lollobrigida, José Ferrer, Francisco Rabal, Louis Jourdan, Fernando Rey	Italy; France; Spain	Sea adventure
A Challenge for Robin Hood	C. M. Pennington-Richards	Barrie Ingham	United Kingdom	
Charlie, the Lonesome Cougar	Rex Allen, Winston Hibler	Ron Brown, Bryan Russell, Linda Brown, Jim Wilson	United States	Family-oriented adventure
Chingachgook, die große Schlange	Richard Groschopp	Gojko Mitić, Rolf Römer, Helmut Schreiber	East Germany	Adventure drama, western
The Comedians	Peter Glenville	Richard Burton, Elizabeth Taylor, Alec Guinness, Peter Ustinov, James Earl Jones, Raymond St. Jacques, Cicely Tyson, Lillian Gish	United States; France	
Danger Route	Seth Holt	Richard Johnson, Carol Lynley, Barbara Bouchet	United Kingdom	Spy film, sea adventure
Desert Commandos	Umberto Lenzi	Ken Clark, Horst Frank, Jeanne Valérie	Italy; France; West Germany	War adventure
The Desperate Ones	Alexander Ramati	Maximilian Schell, Raf Vallone, Irene Papas, Fernando Rey, Maria Perschy	United States; Spain	
The Dirty Dozen	Robert Aldrich	Lee Marvin, Charles Bronson, Jim Brown, John Cassavetes, Ernest Borgnine, Telly Savalas, Donald Sutherland	United Kingdom; United States	War adventure
Dirty Heroes	Alberto De Martino	Frederick Stafford, Daniela Bianchi, Curd Jürgens, Adolfo Celi, Michel Constantin, John Ireland	Italy; France; West Germany	War adventure
Doctor Dolittle	Richard Fleischer	Rex Harrison, Samantha Eggar	United States	Family-oriented adventure, musical
Easy Come, Easy Go	John Rich	Elvis Presley	United States	Sea adventure, musical
Fathom	Leslie H. Martinson	Raquel Welch, Anthony Franciosa	United Kingdom	
Follow That Camel	Gerald Thomas	Phil Silvers, Kenneth Williams, Jim Dale, Charles Hawtrey, Joan Sims, Angela Douglas	United Kingdom	Adventure comedy
Frau Venus und ihr Teufel	Ralf Kirsten	Manfred Krug	East Germany	Adventure comedy, fantasy adventure
The Girl and the General	Pasquale Festa Campanile	Rod Steiger, Virna Lisi, Umberto Orsini	Italy	War adventure
The Glass Sphinx	Luigi Scattini	Robert Taylor, Anita Ekberg	Italy	
Grand Slam	Giuliano Montaldo	Janet Leigh, Edward G. Robinson, Klaus Kinski, Robert Hoffmann, Adolfo Celi	Italy; Spain; West Germany	
Gungala la vergine della giungla	Romano Ferrara	Kitty Swan	Italy	
El halcón de Castilla	José María Elorrieta	Germán Cobos, Nuria Torray	Spain	
L'Homme qui valait des milliards	Michel Boisrond	Frederick Stafford, Raymond Pellegrin, Peter van Eyck, Anny Duperey	France	
Island of the Lost	John Florea	Richard Greene, Luke Halpin	United States	Family-oriented adventure
The Jackals	Robert D. Webb	Vincent Price	South Africa; United States	Western
Jules Verne's Rocket to the Moon	Don Sharp	Burl Ives, Gert Fröbe, Terry-Thomas, Daliah Lavi, Troy Donahue, Hermione Gingold, Lionel Jeffries, Dennis Price	United Kingdom	Adventure comedy, science fiction adventure
The Jungle Book	Wolfgang Reitherman	Bruce Reitherman (voice), Phil Harris (voice), George Sanders (voice)	United States	Animated film, family-oriented adventure
Kill a Dragon	Michael D. Moore	Jack Palance, Fernando Lamas, Aldo Ray	United States	
The King's Pirate	Don Weis	Doug McClure, Jill St. John, Guy Stockwell	United States	Pirate film
The Last Adventure	Robert Enrico	Alain Delon, Lino Ventura, Joanna Shimkus, Serge Reggiani	France; Italy	
The Last Safari	Henry Hathaway	Stewart Granger	United Kingdom	
The Long Duel	Ken Annakin	Yul Brynner, Trevor Howard, Charlotte Rampling	United Kingdom	
The Longest Hundred Miles	Don Weis	Doug McClure, Katharine Ross, Ricardo Montalbán	United States	War adventure
The Looters	Jacques Besnard	Jean Seberg, Frederick Stafford, Serge Gainsbourg	France; Italy	
Maroc 7	Gerry O'Hara	Elsa Martinelli, Cyd Charisse, Gene Barry, Alexandra Stewart	United Kingdom	
Massacre in the Black Forest	Ferdinando Baldi, Rudolf Nussgruber	Cameron Mitchell, Antonella Lualdi, Hans von Borsody	West Germany; Italy; Yugoslavia	Historical drama
More Than a Miracle	Francesco Rosi	Omar Sharif, Sophia Loren, Dolores del Río, Georges Wilson	Italy; France	
The Mummy's Shroud	John Gilling	André Morell, John Phillips, Elizabeth Sellars	United Kingdom	Horror adventure
On My Way to the Crusades, I Met a Girl Who...	Pasquale Festa Campanile	Tony Curtis, Monica Vitti	Italy	Adventure comedy
The Partisan of Villa	Miguel Morayta	Carmen Sevilla	Mexico; Spain	Musical
The Peking Medallion	James Hill	Robert Stack, Elke Sommer, Nancy Kwan	West Germany; Italy; France	
The Perils of Pauline	Herbert B. Leonard, Joshua Shelley	Pamela Austin, Pat Boone, Terry-Thomas, Edward Everett Horton	United States	Adventure comedy, romantic adventure
Prehistoric Women	Michael Carreras	Martine Beswick	United Kingdom	
The Reluctant Astronaut	Edward Montagne	Don Knotts, Leslie Nielsen, Joan Freeman, Jesse White	United States	Space adventure, adventure comedy
The Rover	Terence Young	Anthony Quinn, Rosanna Schiaffino, Rita Hayworth, Richard Johnson	Italy	Sea adventure
Sept hommes et une garce	Bernard Borderie	Jean Marais, Marilù Tolo	France; Italy	
Snow Devils	Antonio Margheriti	Giacomo Rossi Stuart, Ombretta Colli	Italy; United States	Space adventure
Sullivan's Empire	Harvey Hart, Thomas Carr	Martin Milner, Clu Gulager, Karen Jensen	United States	
Tarzan and the Great River	Robert Day	Mike Henry	United States	
The Testament of Aga Koppanyi	Eva Zsurzs	Ferenc Bessenyei, Klári Tolnay, Péter Benko, István Iglódi	Hungary	
Les Têtes brûlées	Willy Rozier	Lang Jeffries, Estella Blain	France; Spain	
They Came from Beyond Space	Freddie Francis	Robert Hutton, Jennifer Jayne, Zia Mohyeddin	United Kingdom	Space adventure
Tobruk	Arthur Hiller	Rock Hudson, George Peppard, Nigel Green, Guy Stockwell	United States	War adventure
The Treasure of Makuba	José María Elorrieta	Cameron Mitchell	Spain; United States	
Untamable Angelique	Bernard Borderie	Michèle Mercier, Robert Hossein, Roger Pigaut	France; Italy; West Germany	Romantic adventure
Valley of Mystery	Józef Lejtes	Richard Egan, Peter Graves, Julie Adams	United States	
The Viking Queen	Don Chaffey	Don Murray, Carita, Donald Houston	United States; United Kingdom	
The Wild Eye	Paolo Cavara	Philippe Leroy, Delia Boccardo, Gabriele Tinti	Italy	
You Only Live Twice	Lewis Gilbert	Sean Connery, Akiko Wakabayashi, Mie Hama, Karin Dor, Donald Pleasence, Tetsurō Tamba	United Kingdom	Spy film

== 1968 ==
Title	Director	Cast	Country	Subgenre/Notes
1001 Nights	José María Elorrieta	Luciana Paluzzi, Jeff Cooper, Raf Vallone	Spain; Italy	
2001: A Space Odyssey	Stanley Kubrick	Keir Dullea, Gary Lockwood, William Sylvester	United Kingdom; United States	Space adventure
Angelique and the Sultan	Bernard Borderie	Michèle Mercier, Robert Hossein, Jean-Claude Pascal	France; West Germany; Italy	Romantic adventure
Asterix and Cleopatra	René Goscinny, Albert Uderzo		France; Belgium	Animated film, adventure comedy
The Bamboo Saucer	Frank Telford	Dan Duryea, John Ericson, Lois Nettleton	United States	
Barbarella	Roger Vadim	Jane Fonda, John Phillip Law, Anita Pallenberg	France; Italy	Space adventure
The Blood of Fu Manchu	Jesús Franco	Christopher Lee, Richard Greene, Howard Marion-Crawford, Götz George	United Kingdom	
Captain Singrid	Jean Leduc	Elga Andersen, Robert Woods	France	
Carry On Up the Khyber	Gerald Thomas	Sid James, Kenneth Williams, Charles Hawtrey, Roy Castle, Joan Sims, Terry Scott, Angela Douglas	United Kingdom	Adventure comedy
El "Che" Guevara	Paolo Heusch	Francisco Rabal, John Ireland	Italy	
Chitty Chitty Bang Bang	Ken Hughes	Dick Van Dyke, Sally Ann Howes, Lionel Jeffries, James Robertson Justice, Robert Helpmann, Gert Fröbe	United Kingdom	Musical, family-oriented adventure
Dark of the Sun	Jack Cardiff	Rod Taylor, Jim Brown, Yvette Mimieux	United Kingdom; United States	War adventure
Darling Caroline	Denys de La Patellière	France Anglade, Vittorio De Sica, Bernard Blier, Charles Aznavour, Gert Fröbe, Jean-Claude Brialy, Karin Dor	France; Italy; West Germany	
Duffy	Robert Parrish	James Coburn, James Mason, James Fox, Susannah York	United Kingdom; United States	Adventure comedy
Eve	Jeremy Summers	Celeste Yarnall, Christopher Lee, Herbert Lom, Robert Walker	United Kingdom	
The Golden Claws of the Cat Girl	Édouard Logereau	Danielle Gaubert, Michel Duchaussoy, Julien Guiomar	France; Italy	
Gungala la pantera nuda	Ruggero Deodato	Kitty Swan	Italy	
Guns for San Sebastian	Henri Verneuil	Anthony Quinn, Charles Bronson	France; Mexico; Italy	Western
Hauptmann Florian von der Mühle	Werner W. Wallroth	Manfred Krug	East Germany	Adventure comedy
Hell in the Pacific	John Boorman	Lee Marvin, Toshiro Mifune	United States	War adventure
The Hell with Heroes	Joseph Sargent	Rod Taylor, Claudia Cardinale, Harry Guardino	United States	
Hellfighters	Andrew V. McLaglen	John Wayne, Katharine Ross, Jim Hutton, Vera Miles	United States	
Ice Station Zebra	John Sturges	Rock Hudson, Ernest Borgnine, Patrick McGoohan, Jim Brown	United States	Arctic adventure, sea adventure, thriller
King of Africa	Sandy Howard, Nino Scolaro	Ty Hardin, Pier Angeli, George Sanders, Rossano Brazzi	Italy; Spain; South Africa	
Kong Island	Roberto Mauri	Brad Harris, Esmeralda Barros, Marc Lawrence	Italy	
The Last Mercenary	Mel Welles	Ray Danton, Pascale Petit, Carl Möhner	Italy; Spain; West Germany	
The Last Roman	Robert Siodmak	Laurence Harvey, Orson Welles, Sylva Koscina, Michael Dunn, Honor Blackman, Robert Hoffmann, Harriet Andersson, Friedrich von Ledebur	West Germany; Italy; Romania	
The Lost Continent	Michael Carreras	Eric Porter, Hildegard Knef, Suzanna Leigh	United Kingdom	Sea adventure
Luana, la figlia della foresta vergine	Roberto Infascelli	Mei Chen, Glenn Saxson, Evi Marandi	Italy; West Germany	
Lucrezia	Osvaldo Civirani	Olga Schoberová, Lou Castel, Gianni Garko	Italy; Austria	
Martín Fierro	Leopoldo Torre Nilsson	Alfredo Alcón	Argentina	
The Mercenary	Sergio Corbucci	Franco Nero, Tony Musante, Jack Palance, Giovanna Ralli, Eduardo Fajardo	Italy; Spain	Western
My Side of the Mountain	James B. Clark	Teddy Eccles, Theodore Bikel	Canada	
The Pink Jungle	Delbert Mann	James Garner, George Kennedy, Eva Renzi	United States	
Planet of the Apes	Franklin J. Schaffner	Charlton Heston, Roddy McDowall, Maurice Evans, Kim Hunter	United States	Science fiction adventure
Radhapura – Endstation der Verdammten	Hans Albin	George Nader, Gordon Mitchell, Carl Möhner, Femi Benussi	West Germany; Italy	
Ragan	José Briz Méndez, Luciano Lelli	Ty Hardin, Antonella Lualdi	Spain; Italy	
Le Rapace	José Giovanni	Lino Ventura	France; Mexico	
Răpirea fecioarelor	Dinu Cocea	Emanoil Petruț, Marga Barbu, George Constantin	Romania	
The Ruthless Four	Giorgio Capitani	Van Heflin, Gilbert Roland, Klaus Kinski, George Hilton	Italy; West Germany	Western
Samoa, Queen of the Jungle	Guido Malatesta	Edwige Fenech, Roger Browne, Femi Benussi	Italy	
The Son of Black Eagle	Guido Malatesta	Mimmo Palmara, Edwige Fenech	Italy	
Stars of Eger	Zoltán Várkonyi	Imre Sinkovits, György Bárdy, István Kovács, Tibor Bitskey, Gábor Agárdy, Vera Venczel, Éva Ruttkai	Hungary	
The Syndicate	Frederic Goode	William Sylvester, June Ritchie, Robert Urquhart, Christian Doermer	United Kingdom	
Tarzan and the Jungle Boy	Robert Gordon	Mike Henry	United States	Last film of the Tarzan series
Thunderbird 6	David Lane		United Kingdom	Marionette film, space adventure, family-oriented adventure
Tower of Screaming Virgins	Franz Antel	Teri Tordai, Jean Piat, Uschi Glas, Jacques Herlin, Rudolf Forster	West Germany; France; Italy	
A Twist of Sand	Don Chaffey	Richard Johnson, Honor Blackman, Jeremy Kemp	United Kingdom	
The Two Crusaders	Giuseppe Orlandini	Franco and Ciccio, Janet Ågren	Italy	Adventure comedy
Villa Rides	Buzz Kulik	Robert Mitchum, Yul Brynner, Charles Bronson, Maria Grazia Buccella, Herbert Lom, Fernando Rey	United States	Western
Where Eagles Dare	Brian G. Hutton	Richard Burton, Clint Eastwood, Mary Ure	United Kingdom; United States	War adventure
Will Our Heroes Be Able to Find Their Friend Who Has Mysteriously Disappeared in Africa?	Ettore Scola	Alberto Sordi, Nino Manfredi, Bernard Blier	Italy	Adventure comedy
Witchfinder General	Michael Reeves	Vincent Price, Rupert Davies	United Kingdom	Horror adventure
Yellow Submarine	George Dunning		United Kingdom	Animated film, fantasy adventure

== 1969 ==
Title	Director	Cast	Country	Subgenre/Notes
100 Rifles	Tom Gries	Burt Reynolds, Raquel Welch, Jim Brown	United States	Western
2000 Years Later	Bert Tenzer	Terry-Thomas, Edward Everett Horton, Pat Harrington Jr.	United States	Fantasy adventure
Age of Consent	Michael Powell	James Mason, Helen Mirren, Jack MacGowran	Australia	
Alfred the Great	Clive Donner	David Hemmings, Michael York, Prunella Ransome	United Kingdom	
The Assassination Bureau	Basil Dearden	Oliver Reed, Diana Rigg, Telly Savalas, Curd Jürgens, Philippe Noiret	United Kingdom	Adventure comedy
Bootleggers	Alfio Caltabiano	George Eastman, Wayde Preston, Eduardo Fajardo	Italy; Spain	
Burn!	Gillo Pontecorvo	Marlon Brando, Evaristo Márquez	Italy; France	
The Bushbaby	John Trent	Margaret Brooks, Louis Gossett Jr., Donald Houston, Laurence Naismith	United Kingdom	
Butch Cassidy and the Sundance Kid	George Roy Hill	Paul Newman, Robert Redford, Katharine Ross	United States	Western
Captain Nemo and the Underwater City	James Hill	Robert Ryan, Chuck Connors	United Kingdom	Science fiction adventure, sea adventure
Catherine, il suffit d'un amour	Bernard Borderie	Olga Georges-Picot, Francine Bergé, Roger Van Hool, Claude Brasseur, Horst Frank, André Pousse, Roger Pigaut	France; Italy; West Germany	Romantic adventure
Che!	Richard Fleischer	Omar Sharif, Jack Palance, Cesare Danova, Robert Loggia, Woody Strode	United States	
Colonel Wolodyjowski	Jerzy Hoffman	Tadeusz Łomnicki, Magdalena Zawadzka, Mieczysław Pawlikowski, Jan Nowicki, Daniel Olbrychski	Poland	
Easy Rider	Dennis Hopper	Dennis Hopper, Peter Fonda, Jack Nicholson	United States	Adventure drama
The Emerald of Artatama	José María Elorrieta	Rory Calhoun	Spain; United States	
Les Étrangers	Jean-Pierre Desagnat	Senta Berger, Michel Constantin, Julián Mateos, Hans Meyer	France; West Germany; Spain; Italy	Thriller
The Extraordinary Seaman	John Frankenheimer	David Niven, Faye Dunaway, Alan Alda, Mickey Rooney	United States	Sea adventure, war adventure, adventure comedy
The Five Man Army	Don Taylor	Peter Graves, Bud Spencer, Tetsurō Tamba, James Daly, Nino Castelnuovo	Italy	Western
Franco, Ciccio e il pirata Barbanera	Mario Amendola	Franco and Ciccio, Fernando Sancho	Italy	Adventure comedy, pirate film
Gallos de pelea	Rafael Moreno Alba	Simón Andreu	Spain	
Hannibal Brooks	Michael Winner	Oliver Reed, Michael J. Pollard, Wolfgang Preiss	United Kingdom	War adventure
Impasse	Richard Benedict	Burt Reynolds, Anne Francis	United States	Action adventure, romantic adventure
Justine	George Cukor	Anouk Aimée, Michael York, Dirk Bogarde, Robert Forster, Anna Karina, Philippe Noiret, John Vernon, Marcel Dalio	United States	
Kenner	Steve Sekely	Jim Brown, Madlyn Rhue, Robert Coote	United States	
Krakatoa, East of Java	Bernard L. Kowalski	Maximilian Schell, Diane Baker, Brian Keith, Sal Mineo, Rossano Brazzi	United States	Sea adventure
Latitude Zero	Ishirō Honda	Joseph Cotten, Cesar Romero, Akira Takarada, Masumi Okada, Richard Jaeckel, Patricia Medina	Japan; United States	Science fiction adventure, sea adventure
Lost in the Desert	Jamie Uys	Wynand Uys	South Africa	
Mackenna's Gold	J. Lee Thompson	Gregory Peck, Omar Sharif, Telly Savalas, Edward G. Robinson, Eli Wallach	United States	Western
Man on Horseback	Volker Schlöndorff	David Warner, Anna Karina	West Germany	
Monte Carlo or Bust!	Ken Annakin	Tony Curtis, Terry-Thomas, Mireille Darc, Bourvil, Gert Fröbe	United States; France; Italy; United Kingdom	Adventure comedy
Ms. Stiletto	Bruno Corbucci	Brigitte Skay	Italy	
On Her Majesty's Secret Service	Peter Hunt	George Lazenby, Diana Rigg, Telly Savalas, Gabriele Ferzetti	United Kingdom	Spy film, romantic adventure
Play Dirty	Andre DeToth	Michael Caine, Nigel Davenport, Nigel Green, Harry Andrews	United Kingdom	War adventure
The Pleasure Pit	André Cayatte	Renaud Verley, Jane Birkin, Elsa Martinelli, Serge Gainsbourg	France; Italy	
The Red Tent	Mikhail Kalatozov	Peter Finch, Sean Connery, Claudia Cardinale, Hardy Krüger, Mario Adorf	Soviet Union; Italy	Arctic adventure
The Royal Hunt of the Sun	Irving Lerner	Robert Shaw, Christopher Plummer	United Kingdom; United States	
Safari 5000	Koreyoshi Kurahara	Toshiro Mifune, Emmanuelle Riva, Yujiro Ishihara, Ruriko Asaoka, Jean-Claude Drouot	Japan	
Sam Whiskey	Arnold Laven	Burt Reynolds, Angie Dickinson, Clint Walker, Ossie Davis	United States	Western
Samurai Banners	Hiroshi Inagaki	Toshirō Mifune, Yujiro Ishihara, Kan'emon Nakamura	Japan	Adventure drama, romantic adventure
The Seven Red Berets	Mario Siciliano	Ivan Rassimov, Sieghardt Rupp, Kirk Morris, Arthur Brauss	Italy; West Germany	War adventure
Shark!	Samuel Fuller	Burt Reynolds	United States	Sea adventure
Simón Bolívar	Alessandro Blasetti	Maximilian Schell, Rosanna Schiaffino, Francisco Rabal, Fernando Sancho	Spain; Italy; Venezuela	
Sinful Davey	John Huston	John Hurt, Pamela Franklin, Nigel Davenport, Robert Morley	United Kingdom	
The Southern Star	Sidney Hayers	George Segal, Ursula Andress, Orson Welles	France; United Kingdom	Adventure comedy
Target: Harry	Roger Corman	Vic Morrow, Suzanne Pleshette, Michael Ansara, Victor Buono, Cesar Romero, Charlotte Rampling, Stanley Holloway	United States	
Tarkan	Tunç Başaran	Kartal Tibet	Turkey	
Tarzana, the Wild Girl	Guido Malatesta	Femi Benussi, Ken Clark, Beryl Cunningham	Italy	
Tintin and the Temple of the Sun	Eddie Lateste		France; Belgium	Animated film, family-oriented adventure
Under the Sign of Scorpio	Paolo and Vittorio Taviani	Gian Maria Volonté, Lucia Bosè	Italy	
A Walk with Love and Death	John Huston	Anjelica Huston, Assi Dayan	United States	Adventure drama
Where's Jack?	James Clavell	Tommy Steele, Stanley Baker, Fiona Lewis	United Kingdom	
The Wild Bunch	Sam Peckinpah	William Holden, Ernest Borgnine, Robert Ryan, Warren Oates, Ben Johnson, Emilio Fernández	United States	Western
Zenabel	Ruggero Deodato	Lucretia Love, John Ireland, Lionel Stander	Italy	Adventure comedy
Zorro il dominatore	José Luis Merino	Carlos Quiney	Spain; Italy	
Zorro in the Court of England	Franco Montemurro	Spiros Focás	Italy	
Zorro marchese di Navarra	Franco Montemurro	Nadir Moretti, Malisa Longo	Italy	
