= Edmund Hashim =

American actor (1933–74)

- Born: June 2, 1933; Haverhill, Massachusetts, U.S.
- Died: July 2, 1974 (aged 41); New York, U.S.
- Other name: Ed Hashim
- Occupation: Actor
- Years active: 1955–1971

Edmund Hashim (June 2, 1933 – July 2, 1974) was an American actor. He was known for Hellfighters (1968), The Green Hornet (1967), several different roles in Gunsmoke (1966-1969), Giacobbe ed Esau (1963), Alfred Hitchcock Presents (1961), Brave Eagle (1955–1956), and many other roles between 1955 and 1971.

== Filmography ==
Films and television appearances follow.

=== Films ===
- Shaft (1971) as Lee
- Hellfighters (1968) as Colonel Valdez
- And Now Miguel (1966) as Eli
- The Last Ride to Santa Cruz (1964) as Sheriff
- Giacobbe ed Esau (1963)
- The Outsider (1961) as Jay Morago
- I Passed for White (1960) as Club Patron
- The Miracle (1959) as Soldier (uncredited)
- Omar Khayyam (1957) as Turkoman (uncredited)
- The Helen Morgan Story (1957) as Henchman (uncredited)
- Ghost Town (1956) as Stone Knife
- Quincannon, Frontier Scout (1956) as Iron Wolf
- The Ten Commandments (1956) as Captain of the Guards, Officer, and Captain of Trumpeters (uncredited)
- Kismet (1955) as Nobleman (uncredited)

=== Television ===
- Dark Shadows (1970) (Season 1 Episode 1003) as Wilfred Block
- Another World (1969) (3 episodes) as Wayne Addison
- Gunsmoke (1966-1969)
  - (Season 15 Episode 7: "Charlie Noon") (1969) as Lone Wolf
  - (Season 14 Episode 16: "Time of the Jackals") (1969) as Tim Jackson
  - (Season 13 Episode 16: "The Victim") (1968) as Brock
  - (Season 13 Episode 1: "The Wreckers") (1967) as Monk Wiley
  - (Season 12 Episode 15: "The Hanging") (1966) as Saline
  - (Season 11 Episode 25: "The Brothers") (1966) as Durgen
  - (Season 11 Episode 18: "The Raid: Part 1") (1966) as Johnny Barnes
- The Outsider (1969) (Season 1 Episode 21: "Handle with Care") as Phil Campos
- The Flying Nun (1968) (Season 2 Episode 3: "The Rabbi and the Nun") as Alfredo Acquilar
- Mission: Impossible (1968) (Season 2 Episode 24: "Trial by Fury") as Valesquez
- Run for Your Life (1966-1967)
  - (Season 3 Episode 13: "The Mustafa Embrace") (1967) as Ahmed Mustafa
  - (Season 2 Episode 7: "Edge of the Volcano") (1966) as Colonel Sientos
- The Wild Wild West (1967) (Season 3 Episode 8: "The Night of Montezuma's Hordes") as Colonel Pedro Sanchez
- I Spy (1967) (Season 3 Episode 4: "The Medarra Block") as Sharp
- The Green Hornet (1967) (Season 1 Episode 21: "Trouble for Prince Charming") as Prince Rafil
- Get Smart (1966) (Season 2 Episode 4: "The Only Way to Die") as Carioca
- Perry Mason (1966) (Season 9 Episode 25: "The Case of the Unwelcome Well") as Prince Ben Ali Bhudeem
- The Man from U.N.C.L.E. (1966) (Season 2 Episode 22: "The Foreign Legion Affair") as Ali Tchard
- The Magical World of Disney (1964) as Duke
  - (Season 10 Episode 12: "The Ballad of Hector the Stowaway Dog: Where the Heck is Hector?")
  - (Season 10 Episode 13: "The Ballad of Hector the Stowaway Dog: Who the Heck is Hector?")
- The New Loretta Young Show (1963) (Season 1 Episode 24: "Interesting Jeopardy") as Sheik Ahmed
- Shotgun Slade (1961) (Season 2 Episode 17: "Misplaced Genius") as Damian
- Alfred Hitchcock Presents (1961)
  - (Season 6 Episode 28: "Gratitude") as Masotti
  - (Season 7 Episode 3: "Maria") as El Magnifico
  - (Season 7 Episode 5: "Keep Me Company") as Marco Reddy / Harry Miland
- Miami Undercover (1961) (Season 1 Episode 20: "Cukie Dog") as Marty Blake
- Tales of Wells Fargo (1957-1961)
  - (Season 5 Episode 33: "Rifles for Red Hand") (1961) as Wing
  - (Season 3 Episode 3: "White Indian") (1958) as Indian
  - (Season 2 Episode 1: "Belle Star") (1957) as Jim July
- The Detectives (1961) (Season 2 Episode 32: "Other Cheek") as Max Williams
- The Brothers Brannagan (1961) (Season 1 Episode 24: "Wheel of Fortune") as Eric Sandoval
- Checkmate (1961) (Season 1 Episode 20: "A Matter of Conscience") as Steve Krell
- Hong Kong (1961) (Season 1 Episode 16: "The Survivor") as Father Serano
- Tombstone Territory (1960) (Season 3 Episode 35: "The Iron Coach") as Manatou's Lieutenant
- The Untouchables (1960) (Season 1 Episode 19: "The Big Squeeze") as Matty Church
- Mackenzie's Raiders (1959) (Season 1 Episode 39: "Devil Trap") as Corporal Kill Eagle
- Richard Diamond, Private Detective (1959) (Season 3 Episode 18: "Design for Murder") as Carl Otero
- Wagon Train (1959) (Season 2 Episode 27: "The Swift Cloud Story") as Wamsutta
- The Third Man (1959) (Season 1 Episode 13: "The Indispensable Man") as Marcel
- Sky King (1959) (Season 4 Episode 7: "Terror Cruise") as Sal
- Tales of the Texas Rangers (1958) (Season 3 Episode 2: "Warpath") as Black Eagle
- The Restless Gun (1958) (Season 1 Episode 19: "Hang and Be Damned") as Indian Renegade Leader
- M Squad (1957) (Season 1 Episode 12: "The Specialists") as Nick Arnold
- The Thin Man (1957) (Season 1 Episode 10: "Ring Around Rosie") as Luigi Midelli
- The Sheriff of Cochise (1957) (Season 2 Episode 4: "Hold Up") as George
- The Lone Ranger (1956)
  - (Season 5 Episode 16: "Ghost Canyon") (1956) as Bright Eagle
  - (Season 5 Episode 6: "White Hawk's Decision") (1956) as Little Hawk
- Matinee Theatre (1956) (Season 2 Episode 63: "Captain Brasshound's Conversion")
- The Man Called X (1956) (Season 1 Episode 9: "Provocateur") as Provocateur
- Brave Eagle (1955-1956)
  - (Season 1 Episode 25: "Trouble at Medicine Creek") (1956)
  - (Season 1 Episode 18: "The Gentle Warrior") (1956)
  - (Season 1 Episode 13: "The Challenge") (1955)
  - (Season 1 Episode 7: "Mask of Manitou") (1955)
  - (Season 1 Episode 1: "Blood Brother") (1955)
- TV Reader's Digest (1956) (Season 2 Episode 16: "Cochise, Greatest of the Apaches") as Geronimo
- Lassie (1955) (Season 2 Episode 15: "The Gypsies") as Bakka
- Jungle Jim (1955) (Season 1 Episode 3: "Treasure of the Amazon") as Madiero
- Passport to Danger (1955) (Episode: "Teheran") as Thug
- The Adventures of Rin Tin Tin (1955) (Season 1 Episode 20: "Rusty Resigns from the Army") as Tumacori
