= Jacob and Esau (film) =

- Directed by: Mario Landi
- Written by: Mario Landi; Moraldo Rossi
- Produced by: Domenico Seymandi
- Starring: Edmund Hashim; Ken Clark; Wandisa Guida; Rossana Mace; Fosco Giachetti; Massimo Serato; Elisa Cegani
- Cinematography: Anchise Brizzi
- Music by: Carlo Savina
- Distributed by: Variety Distribution
- Release date: 1963
- Country: Italy
- Language: Italian

Jacob and Esau (Italian: Giacobbe ed Esaù) is a 1963 Italian religious epic drama film written and directed by Mario Landi and starring Edmund Hashim and Ken Clark in the title roles.

== Plot ==
Esau was born before Jacob, giving Esau the birthright. Jacob tricks Esau into giving him the birthright.

== Cast ==
- Edmund Hashim as Jacob
- Ken Clark as Adult Esau
- Fosco Giachetti as Isaac
- Elisa Cegani as Rebekah
- Massimo Serato as Ishmael
- Ennio Girolami as Young Esau
- Wandisa Guida as Judith
- Aldo Silvani
