= Gli eroi del doppio gioco =

1962 film directed by Camillo Mastrocinque

- Directed by: Camillo Mastrocinque
- Written by: Fulvio Palmieri
- Produced by: Fortunato Misiano
- Cinematography: Augusto Tiezzi
- Music by: Gianni Ferrio
- Release date: 1962
- Language: Italian

Gli eroi del doppio gioco (Italian for "Heroes of the double play") is a 1962 Italian comedy film directed by Camillo Mastrocinque.

== Plot ==
The film tells the successful attempts of two families of cancelling the traces of their involvement with Fascism after the Second World War.

== Cast ==
- Mario Carotenuto as Romolo Rossi
- Aroldo Tieri as Primo Rossi
- Carlo Croccolo as Secondo Rossi
- Gabriele Antonini as Benito Rossi
- Gianrico Tedeschi as Pietro Malaguti
- Wandisa Guida as Luciana Riccio
- Carlo D'Angelo as Yerarch Riccio
- Gino Bramieri as Vincenzo Barbara
