= Robert Gottschalk =

American cinematographer and inventor

- Born: Robert Edward Gottschalk; March 12, 1918; Chicago, Illinois, US
- Died: June 3, 1982 (aged 64); Bel Air, California, US
- Cause of death: Homicide
- Education: Carleton College
- Occupations: Camera technician, inventor
- Organization: Panavision
- Notable work: Dangerous Charter (producer)
- Awards: Academy Award for Scientific Engineering. Academy Award of Merit

Robert Gottschalk (March 12, 1918 – June 3, 1982) was an American camera technician, inventor, and co-founder of Panavision.

== Early life ==
Born to Gustav and Anna Gottschalk in Chicago, Illinois. His father was an architect who built several hotels in the city. Gustav's success left the family well-off financially and influenced Gottschalk's interest in film. In 1939, Gottschalk graduated with a degree in theater and arts from Carleton College in Minnesota. He then moved to California to open a camera shop with a long-term goal of becoming a filmmaker.

== Panavision ==
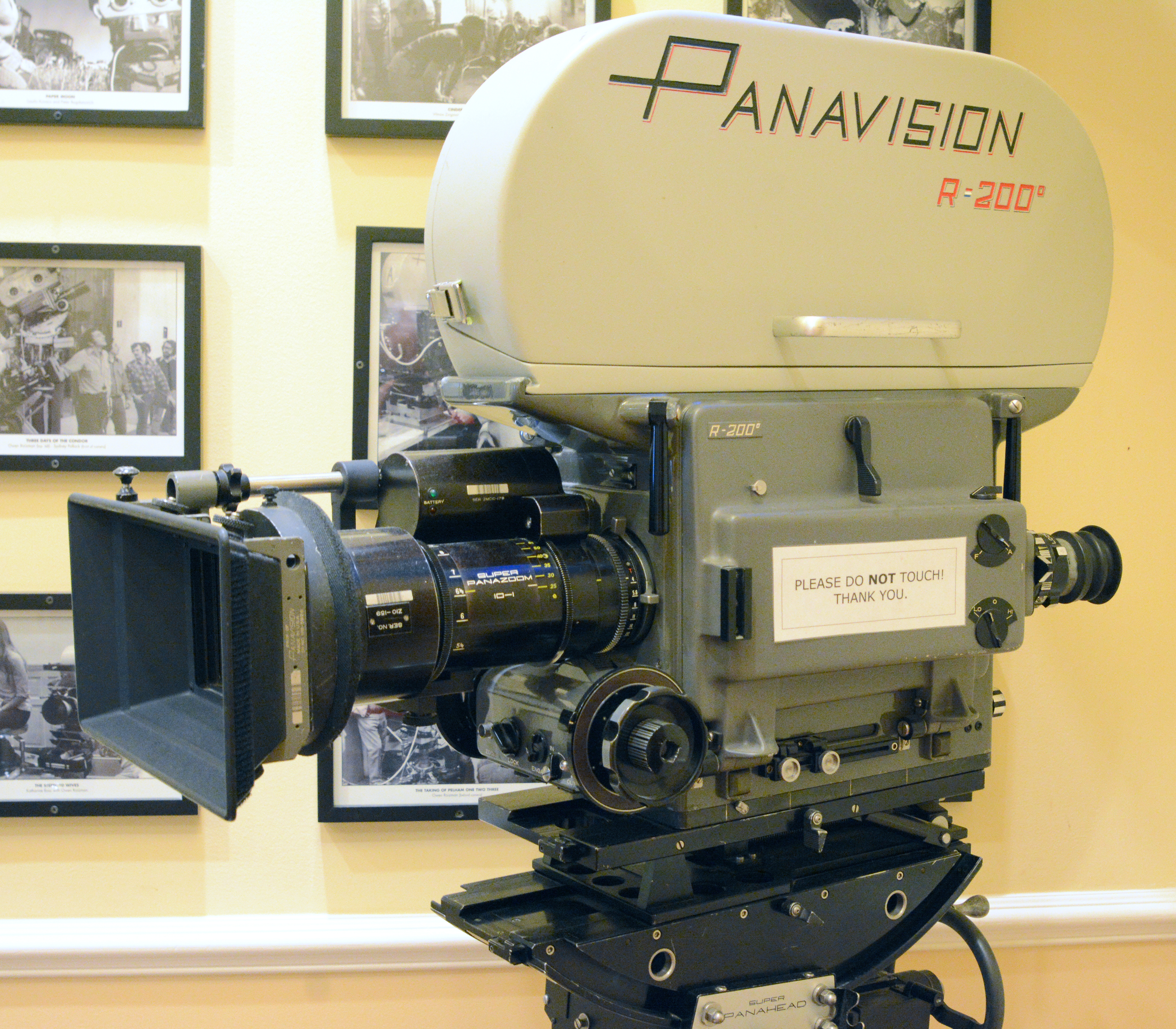
Panavision movie camera

He bought an interest in a camera shop in Westwood area of Los Angeles where he would later hire Richard Moore as a clerk.

In 1951, at the request of the U.S. Aqua-Lung distributor, Gottschalk began working on developing an underwater camera. This would lead to Gottschalk's first purchase of two anamorphic lens attachments made by the C. P. Goerz Company.

Equipment restrictions at the time made wide-angle filming difficult. Gottschalk and Moore would set up a makeshift workshop on the balcony of the store, and began designing, modifying, and experimenting with anamorphic lens equipment patented by Henri Chrétien. In 1953, the CinemaScope process, based on Chrétien's patents, was purchased and named by 20th Century Studios.

While the camera lenses were now available, the process required projection lenses as well. Gottschalk teamed up with several colleagues and began offering projection lenses under the name Panavision, which used prismatic rather than cylindrical optics. This led to a successful expansion into lenses for cameras, which are still widely used.

== Awards and achievements ==
Gottschalk was a two-time Academy Award winner. His first was a Special Technical Oscar, awarded in 1960, for the development of the MGM Camera 65 wide-screen photographic system. He shared the Oscar with MGM executive Douglas Shearer and Panavision co-founder Richard Moore. He also received an Academy Award of Merit in 1978 for developing the Panaflex camera.

Under Gottschalk's leadership and enginuity, Panavision received eleven Academy Scientific and Technical Awards from 1958 to 1978. The first was bestowed at the 31st Academy Awards, for the development of the Auto Panatar anamorphic lens, with Gottschalk accepting on behalf of the company.

From 1977 to his death, Gottschalk received 14 patents for his lenses and other camera equipment, including body-mounted support apparatuses, vibration dampeners, and camera harnesses. Six additional patents would be granted after his death, the last coming in May 1986. All but three of his inventions are assigned to Panavision.

== Death ==
On June 3, 1982 at 9 a.m., police received a phone call from Gottschalk's partner of 2 years, Laos "Ronnie" Chuman. Police would find Gottschalk's badly beaten body sprawled out in the master bedroom of his Bel-Air mansion. Chuman, after making conflicting statements during police questioning, admitted to the killing but claimed self-defense, alleging that he [Chuman] was trying to end the relationship against Gottschalk's wishes when the fight broke out. The LA coroner would later testify in pre-trial hearings that Gottschalk suffered at least five blows to the head and 19 stab wounds to the back and chest, while Chuman had only a bruised hand.

Chuman was ordered to stand trial in November 1982, and was convicted of murder in July 1983. He was sentenced to 26 years to life in prison. During sentencing, Judge Laurence J. Rittenband of the Santa Monica Superior Court noted Gottschalk had "signed his own death warrant" after discovery was made that his will had been amended 3 weeks prior to his death, leaving 10% of his estate to Chuman.
