= Dangerous Charter =

- Film poster
- Directed by: Robert Gottschalk
- Screenplay by: Paul Strait
- Story by: Robert Gottschalk
- Produced by: Robert Gottschalk; Richard Moore
- Starring: Chris Warfield; Sally Fraser; Chick Chandler
- Cinematography: Meredith M. Nicholson
- Edited by: George White
- Music by: Ted Dale
- Distributed by: Crown International Pictures
- Release date: September 19, 1962
- Running time: 76 minutes
- Country: United States
- Language: English

Dangerous Charter is a 1962 seagoing adventure film shot in five days in 1958 on and around Santa Catalina Island. California, with no studio shooting. It was directed, co-produced and co-written by Robert Gottschalk as a showcase for his Panavision process. The film was distributed by Crown International Pictures.

== Plot ==
Three struggling deep sea fisherman discover a luxury yacht named the Medusa that is abandoned, with the exception of a dead body found near the mast flying a flag of distress. The trio sail the Medusa into port where they hope to gain a large monetary reward under the law of salvage. The mystery deepens when it is discovered that there are no records on the Medusa and serial numbers have been removed from the ship making identification impossible.

The trio receive ownership of the Medusa and together with Marty's wife and Kick's daughter Sally hire it out as a bareboat charter to take a passenger to Baja California and the crew into danger.

== Cast ==
- Chris Warfield as Marty
- Sally Fraser as June
- Chick Chandler as Kick
- Dick Foote as Dick
- Peter Forster as Monet
- Wright King as Joe
- Carl Milletaire as Goon
- Steve Conte as Goon
- John Zaremba as FBI Special Agent
- John Pickard as Police Detective
- Alex Montoya as Harbor Master
