= List of fantasy films of the 1960s =

A list of fantasy films released in the 1960s.

== List ==
Title	Director	Cast	Country	Notes
1960
The Devil's Eye	Ingmar Bergman	Bibi Andersson, Jarl Kulle, Nils Poppe	Sweden	
The Thief of Baghdad	Arthur Lubin, Bruno Vailati	Steve Reeves, Giorgia Moll, Edy Vessel	France; Italy	
The Three Worlds of Gulliver	Jack Sher	Kerwin Mathews, June Thorburn, Basil Sydney, Sherry Alberoni	United States	
1961
Atlantis, the Lost Continent	George Pal	Anthony Hall, Joyce Taylor, Frank de Kova	United States	
Babes in Toyland	Jack Donohue	Ray Bolger, Tommy Sands, Annette Funicello	United States	
The Night Before Christmas	Aleksandr Rou	Alexander Khvylya, Sergei Martinson	Soviet Union	
Hercules in the Haunted World	Mario Bava	Reg Park	Italy	
Mysterious Island	Cy Endfield	Michael Craig, Joan Greenwood, Michael Callan	United Kingdom; United States	
The Absent-Minded Professor	Robert Stevenson	Fred MacMurray, Nancy Olson, Keenan Wynn	United States	
1962
Jack the Giant Killer	Nathan H. Juran	Kerwin Mathews, Judi Meredith, Torin Thatcher	United States	
The Magic Sword	Bert I. Gordon	Basil Rathbone, Estelle Winwood, Gary Lockwood	United States	
The Wonderful World of the Brothers Grimm	Henry Levin, George Pal	Laurence Harvey, Claire Bloom, Walter Slezak	United States	
Zotz!	William Castle, Ray Russell	Tom Poston, Julia Meade, Jim Backus	United States	
1963
Jason and the Argonauts	Don Chaffey	Todd Armstrong, Nancy Kovack, Gary Raymond	United Kingdom; United States	
Captain Sindbad	Byron Haskin	Guy Williams, Heidi Bruhl, Pedro Armendáriz	United States; Germany	
The Sword in the Stone	Wolfgang Reitherman		United States	Animated film
The Three Lives of Thomasina	Don Chaffey	Patrick McGoohan, Susan Hampshire, Karen Dotrice	United Kingdom; United States	
1964
7 Faces of Dr. Lao	George Pal	Barbara Eden, Arthur O'Connell, John Ericson	United States	
Father Frost (US Title: Jack Frost)	Aleksandr Rou	Alexander Khvylya, Natalya Sedykh, Eduard Izotov	Soviet Union	
The Incredible Mr. Limpet	Arthur Lubin	Don Knotts, Carole Cook, Jack Weston	United States	
Kingdom of Crooked Mirrors	Aleksandr Rou	Olga Yukina, Tatyana Yukina, Andrei Fajt	Soviet Union	
Kwaidan	Masaki Kobayashi	Rentarō Mikuni, Michiyo Aratama, Misako Watanabe, Tetsuro Tamba	Japan	
Mary Poppins	Robert Stevenson	Julie Andrews, Dick Van Dyke, David Tomlinson	United States	
An Ordinary Miracle	Erast Garin	Oleg Vidov, Erast Garin	Soviet Union	
1965
Circus Angel	Albert Lamorisse	Philippe Avron, Mireille Negre, Henri Lambert, Michel de Ré	France	
If I Were Harap Alb	Ion Popescu-Gopo	Florin Piersic, Cristea Avram, Lica Gheorghiu, Irina Petrescu, Eugenia Popovici	Romania	
She	Robert Day	Ursula Andress, Peter Cushing, Bernard Cribbins	United Kingdom	
1966
Batman	Leslie Martinson	Adam West, Burt Ward, Lee Meriwether, Cesar Romero	United States	
Come Drink with Me	King Hu	Chen Hung-Lieh, Cheng Pei-pei, Chung Shen Lao	Hong Kong	
Daimajin	Kimiyoshi Yasuda	Miwa Takada, Yoshihiko Aoyama, Jun Fujimaki	Japan	
The Ghost in the Invisible Bikini	Don Weis	Deborah Walley, Tommy Kirk, Basil Rathbone	United States	
How the Grinch Stole Christmas!	Chuck Jones		United States	Television film, animated film
Journey to the Beginning of Time	Karel Zeman	Josef Lukas, Jimmie Lucas, Charles Goldsmith	Czechoslovakia	
One Million Years B.C.	Don Chaffey	Raquel Welch, John Richardson, Percy Herbert	United Kingdom; United States	
1967
Asterix the Gaul	Ray Goossens		France; Belgium	Animated
Doctor Dolittle	Richard Fleischer, Leslie Bricusse	Rex Harrison, Samantha Eggar, Anthony Newley	United States	
Viy	Konstantin Yershov, Georgi Kropachov	Leonid Kuravlev, Natalya Varley	Soviet Union	Fantasy horror
1968
Asterix and Cleopatra	René Goscinny, Albert Uderzo		France; Belgium	Animated
Barbarella	Dino De Laurentis	Jane Fonda	Italy	
Blackbeard's Ghost	Robert Stevenson	Peter Ustinov, Dean Jones, Suzanne Pleshette	United States	
Chitty Chitty Bang Bang	Ken Hughes	Dick Van Dyke, Sally Ann Howes, Lionel Jeffries	United Kingdom; United States	
Fire, Water, and Brass Pipes	Aleksandr Rou	Natalya Sedykh, Georgy Millyar	Soviet Union	
The Lost Continent	Michael Carreras	Eric Porter, Suzanna Leigh, Tony Beckley	United Kingdom	
The Vengeance of She	Cliff Owen	John Richardson, Olinka Berova, Edward Judd	United Kingdom	
Yellow Submarine	George Dunning, Dick Emery		United Kingdom	Animated film
1969
Kingdom in the Clouds	Elisabeta Bostan	Mircea Breazu, Carmen Stănescu, Emanoil Petruț, Nicolae Secăreanu	Romania, Soviet Union	
