= Giants of Rome =

- Directed by: Anthony Dawson
- Screenplay by: Ernesto Gastaldi; Luciano Martino
- Produced by: Mino Loy; Luciano Martino
- Starring: Richard Harrison; Wandisa Guida; Ettore Manni; Philippe Hersent; Ralph Hudson
- Cinematography: Fausto Zuccoli
- Edited by: Romana Fortini
- Music by: Carlo Rustichelli
- Production companies: Devon Film; N.C.; Radius Productions
- Release dates: 10 September 1964 (Italy); 22 December 1965 (France)
- Running time: 95 minutes
- Countries: Italy; France

Giants of Rome (Italian: I giganti di Roma) is a 1964 international co-production sword and sandal set in the Gallic Wars. It was directed by Anthony Dawson and starred Richard Harrison and Wandisa Guida. The film involves a handpicked group of expert soldiers who infiltrate the enemy's stronghold to locate and destroy a secret weapon prior to the Battle of Alesia.

The film is a co-production between Italy's Devon Film and N.C. and France's Radius Productions. Ralph Hudson's only other credited film role was the lead in Tarzak contro gli uomini leopardo/Ape Man of the Jungle also released in 1964.

== Plot ==
In 52 B.C. Julius Caesar is planning to conquer Vercingetorix and Gaul. Prior to the invasion Caesar orders the four "bravest and strongest soldiers in the army" to be sent on an undercover reconnaissance and raiding mission to locate and destroy an unknown but feared secret weapon of the Druids in three days time as Caesar will attack on the dawn of the fourth day.

Centurion Claudius Marcellus leads three other men, Germanicus the strong man, Varus an expert knife thrower and Castor an experienced and highly competent soldier. The party infiltrates the enemy's lines through the sacrifice of their escort party who launch a suicidal attack on the Druids to attract their attention away from Marcellus' party. Joining the four commandoes is young Valerius; a boy who ran away from a wealthy Roman home to become a Legionary but only became a Gunga Din type labourer.

The party is captured where they are placed next to Livilla, a captured Roman patrician noblewoman and her last surviving member of her Roman Army escort Drusus who has lost his courage and military discipline through constant torture. Called before Vercingetorix, Claudius Marcellus the leader of the group is threatened with torture by heated iron bars but he astounds Vercingetorix by grabbing a hot piece of iron and laying it on his own chest telling the Grand Druid not to waste his time. Taken back to his cell as Vercingetorix schemes better torture, strongman Germanicus is able to bend the bars of the cell so the party can enter the adjoining cell of Livilla and Drusus that makes an escape possible.

Though the Romans now number seven, nearly half their party are not competent soldiers. Livilla and Valerius have no experience whatsoever, and Drusus is an unknown asset; he has lost all desire to be a Roman soldier and only wishes to return home rather than participate in a suicide mission but during their escape he proves himself highly proficient with a captured bow and quiver of arrows against the enemy.

The group faces further tribulations when Valerius is captured and tortured by the enemy to reveal the mission, location and composition of the party as well as the plans of the main body of Caesar's troops. The Roman party attacks a group of Druids and are burdened with two prisoners; one is a woman who Castor falls in love with.

On the early morning of the day of Caesar's attack, the Romans discovers the secret weapon guarding the mountain pass where Caesar's forces will come through. The weapon is a catapult that fires flaming pitch into the attack force igniting the terrain and the attacking soldiers.

== Cast ==
- Richard Harrison as Claudius Marcellus
- Wandisa Guida as Livilla
- Ralph Hudson as Germanicus
- Ettore Manni as Castor
- Goffredo Unger as Varus
- Philippe Hersent as Drusus
- Alberto Dell'Acqua as Valerius
- Nicole Tessier as Edua
- Renato Baldini as Vercingetorix
- Piero Lulli as Pompeus
- Alessandro Sperli as Julius Caesar

== Release ==
Giants of Rome was released in Italy on 10 September 1964. It was released in France on 22 December 1965.
