= Peter Forster (actor) =

English actor (1920–1982)

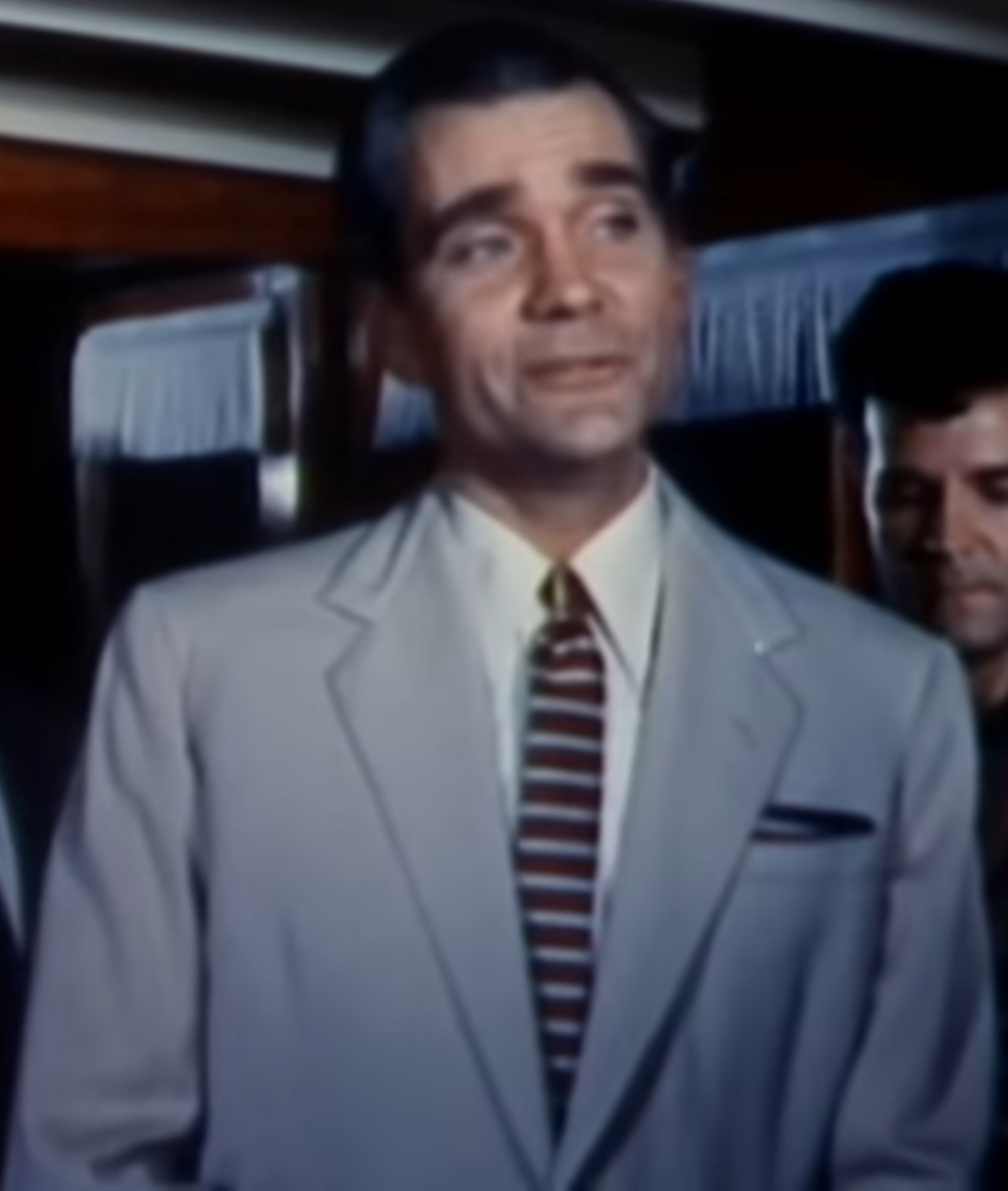
- Peter Forster in Dangerous Charter (1962)
- Born: Peter Cochrane Forster; 29 June 1920; London, UK
- Died: 16 November 1982 (aged 62); Brentwood, Los Angeles, California, U.S.
- Occupation: Actor
- Years active: 1951–1982
- Spouse: Jennifer Raine Forster (1959–1966)
- Children: Brian Forster

Peter Cochrane Forster (29 June 1920 – 16 November 1982) was an English film and television actor. He was born and raised in London, England, where he trained to become an actor before moving to Los Angeles. He married actress Jennifer Raine; the couple's son, Brian Forster, was born in 1960.

Forster's appearances in film include Dangerous Charter, The Three Stooges Go Around the World in a Daze, and Escape from the Planet of the Apes. He appeared on television in shows including The Untouchables, Hazel. Forster died of a heart attack in 1982.

== Filmography ==
| Year | Title | Role | Notes |
|---|---|---|---|
| 1951 | The Desert Fox: The Story of Rommel | Commando | Uncredited |
| 1957 | Träume von der Südsee | Freddy | |
| 1961 | Sea Hunt | Dr. Alan Clark | TV series, 1 episode |
| 1962 | Dangerous Charter | Monet | Shot in 1958 |
| 1963 | Cleopatra | 2nd Officer | Uncredited |
| 1963 | The Three Stooges Go Around the World in a Daze | Vickers Cavendish | |
| 1964 | Father Goose | Chaplain | Uncredited |
| 1966 | Batman | Mr. Percy | Uncredited |
| 1971 | Escape from the Planet of the Apes | Cardinal | |
| 1972 | 1776 | Oliver Wolcott (CT) | Uncredited |
