= Revenge of the Conquered =

- Directed by: Luigi Capuano
- Written by: Nino Stresa; Italo De Tuddo; Roberto Gianviti
- Produced by: Felice Felicioni
- Starring: Burt Nelson; Wandisa Guida; Mario Petri
- Cinematography: Sergio Pesce
- Music by: Carlo Innocenzi
- Release date: 1961
- Language: Italian

Revenge of the Conquered (Italian: Drakut il vendicatore, literally "Drakut the Avenger") is a 1961 Italian epic adventure film directed by Luigi Capuano and starring Burt Nelson and Wandisa Guida. It grossed 244 million lire at the Italian box office.

== Plot ==
This action packed romantic thriller begins as Drakut encounters and saves a pretty young gypsy on his return home from war. Drakut is not aware that the gypsy girl is actually Princess Irina, and she is not aware that Drakut is the son of the gypsy queen. Princess Irina's father, Nicholas, is the fair ruler of the local kingdom, however, is often influenced by the evil Grand Duke, Atanas. Chaos ensues when Atanas has Drakut's mother burned at the stake after speculation that she is a witch. None-the-wiser to Atanas' evil motives Drakut blames Irina for his mother's death. Atanas then has Nicholas killed and blames it on Drakut. When Drakut eventually learns the true identity of the gypsy girl as Princess Irina, he rescues her from an arranged marriage to Atanas. In return, the Princess names Drakut a Prince, making him eligible to marry her.

== Cast ==
- Burt Nelson as Drakut
- Wandisa Guida as Irina
- Mario Petri as Atanas
- Moira Orfei as Edmea
- Walter Barnes
- Franco Fantasia
- Carla Calò
- Maria Grazia Spina
- Rosalia Maggio
- Ugo Sasso
- Elio Crovetto
