= Wandisa Guida =

Italian actress (born 1935)

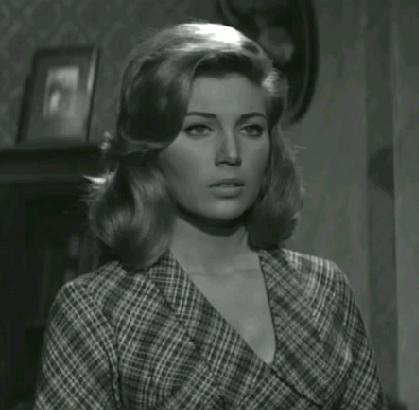
- Guida in the movie Gli eroi del doppio gioco (1962)
- Born: 21 April 1935 (age 91); Trani, Kingdom of Italy
- Other name: Wandisa Leigh
- Occupation: Actress

Wandisa Guida (born 21 April 1935) is an Italian former film, stage and television actress. She was sometimes credited as Wandisa Leigh.

Born in Trani, Italy, Guida took part in the Miss Italia beauty contest in 1954, winning the title of Miss Cinema. She then moved to Rome to attend the Centro Sperimentale di Cinematografia, and after the graduation she appeared in dozens of genre films, sometimes starring in the main roles.

== Filmography ==
Feature films:

- Incatenata dal destino (1956) - Letizia grande
- I colpevoli (1957)
- I Vampiri (1957) - Laurette Robert
- C'è un sentiero nel cielo (1957) - Marisa
- Serenate per 16 bionde (1957) - Christine
- La canzone più bella (1957) - Elena Serventi
- Dinanzi a noi il cielo (1957)
- La trovatella di Pompei (1957) - Luisa
- Toto and Marcellino (1958) - La maestra
- Il Conte di Matera (1958) - Gisella Bressi, sorella di Paolo
- Quando gli angeli piangono (1958)
- I prepotenti (1958) - Marcella Pinelli
- Carosello di canzoni (1958)
- Mia Italida stin Ellada (1958) - Wandisa Vanzi
- Knight Without a Country (1959)
- Il padrone delle ferriere (1959) - Athenaïs de Moulinet
- I mafiosi (1959) - Odette
- Goliath and the Dragon (1960) - Alcinoe
- The Revolt of the Slaves (1960) - Agnese
- Cavalcata selvaggia (1960)
- Capitani di ventura (1961) - Duchess Belinda
- The Prisoner of the Iron Mask (1961) - Christina
- Revenge of the Conquered (1961) - Princess Irina
- The Vengeance of Ursus (1961) - Sira
- Gladiator of Rome (1962) - Nisa
- Gli eroi del doppio gioco (1962) - Luciana Riccio
- Jacob and Esau (1963) - Guiditta - Judith
- Hercules Against Rome (1964) - Ulpia
- Maciste in King Solomon's Mines (1964) - Fazira
- Giants of Rome (1964) - Livilla
- Adventures of the Bengal Lancers (1964) - Mary Stark
- Secret Agent Fireball (1965) - Elena
- Bob Fleming... Mission Casablanca (1966) - Terry Coleman
- Lightning Bolt (1966) - Kary
- The Scorpion with Two Tails (1982) - Heather Hull
