= Peyton Place (novel) =

1956 novel by Grace Metalious

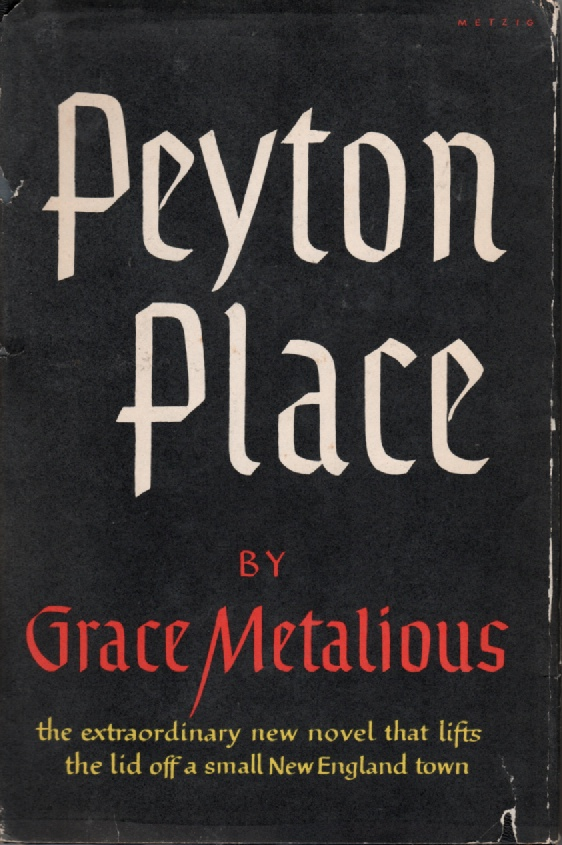
- First edition
- Author: Grace Metalious
- Language: English
- Publisher: Julian Messner, Inc. (hardcover); Dell Publishing (paperback)
- Publication date: September 24, 1956
- Publication place: United States of America
- Media type: Print, e-book
- Pages: 372
- OCLC: 289487
- LC Class: PS3525.E77 P4 1956
- Followed by: Return to Peyton Place
- Text: Peyton Place online

Peyton Place is a 1956 novel by American author Grace Metalious. Set in New England before and after World War II, the novel tells the story of three women who are forced to come to terms with their identity, both as women and as sexual beings, in a small, conservative, gossipy town. Metalious included recurring themes of hypocrisy, social inequities and class privilege in a tale that also includes incest, abortion, adultery, lust and murder. The novel sold 60,000 copies within the first ten days of its release, and it remained on The New York Times best seller list for 59 weeks.

The novel spawned a franchise that would run through four decades. 20th Century-Fox adapted it as a movie in 1957, and Metalious wrote a follow-up novel that was published in 1959, titled Return to Peyton Place, which became a film in 1961 using the same name. The original 1956 novel was adapted again in 1964, in what became a prime time television series for 20th Century Fox Television that ran until 1969, and the term "Peyton Place" entered the American lexicon describing any small town or group that holds scandalous secrets.

A daytime soap opera titled Return to Peyton Place ran from 1972 to 1974, and the franchise had two made-for-television movies: Murder in Peyton Place and Peyton Place: The Next Generation in 1977 and 1985 respectively.

== Background ==
Grace Metalious and her husband George first considered Potter Place, the name of a real community near Andover, New Hampshire. (Note: Potter Place is named after Richard Potter (1783–1835), an African-American magician.) Realizing their town should have a fictional name, they looked through an atlas and discovered the community of Payton, Texas. They combined that with Place and changed the "a" to an "e". Thus, Peyton Place was created, prompting her comment, "Wonderful—that's it, George. Peyton Place. Peyton Place, New Hampshire. Peyton Place, New England. Peyton Place, USA. Truly a composite of all small towns where ugliness rears its head, and where the people try to hide all the skeletons in their closets." Novelist Barbara Delinsky, author of the fictional Looking for Peyton Place (2006), noted that, "The town is a character itself, a seductively beautiful facade that hides a plethora of ills..."

Several characters and events were drawn from events in nearby towns and people that Metalious actually knew. Selena Cross was based on Barbara Roberts, a 20-year-old girl from the village of Gilmanton Ironworks, who murdered her father Sylvester after years of sexual abuse and buried his body under a sheep pen. In the novel, Selena kills her stepfather because incest was considered too taboo for readers at the time. Metalious' editor Kitty Messner made the change, much to the author's dismay and disapproval.

== Plot ==
The story starts in 1937 and continues through the years following World War II.

Lonely and repressed, Constance MacKenzie leaves Peyton Place for New York City at a young age, and meets a man in the fabrics business named Allison MacKenzie, who already is married with children. Constance becomes pregnant with MacKenzie's child. MacKenzie dies a few years after his daughter, also named Allison, is born. Constance and her daughter adopt Allison's last name before returning to Peyton Place as a "widow" and child, and Constance alters her daughter's birth date to make her appear legitimate. With the money she's saved as well as what she received from her late lover's will, she opens up an apparel store called the Thrifty Corner. Allison grows up lonely and isolated, idealizing the father she never had and dreaming of a future as a published author.

The poorer side of Peyton Place is represented by the Cross family, Nellie and Lucas Cross and their daughter Selena, who is Nellie's biological daughter, but not Lucas's. Paul, Lucas's son and Selena's stepbrother, left Peyton Place after accusing Lucas of stealing his money. Nellie and Lucas later have a child together: Joey, who lives with the couple and Selena in "the shacks", a poor section of town being targeted for redevelopment. Selena and Allison become friends, but the drastic difference in their socioeconomic situations ensures the friendship does not last long.

While Allison wants Selena to share her love of bucolic little spots like Road's End, Selena wants only to spend time at Allison's mother's dress shop and, increasingly, to talk with boys. Moreover, when Allison finally gets a look inside the shack where Selena lives, she is horrified by the squalor and the violence she sees in Lucas. Eventually, Allison and Selena grow distant because of Selena's closeness with Ted Carter.

When Selena turns 14 years old, Lucas begins to abuse her, impregnating her and leaving local doctor Matthew Swain in a troublesome situation in which he decides to perform an abortion. The doctor makes Lucas leave town, and after she discovers this, Nellie commits suicide by hanging.

Other storylines follow Leslie Harrington, owner of the local woolen mills, whose son Rodney dies in a car accident, as well as newspaper man Seth Buswell.

== Adaptations and character portrayals ==
Peyton Place was first adapted as a film in 1957 and entirely recast for its 1961 sequel Return to Peyton Place. It was followed by the soap operas Peyton Place (1964–1969) and Return to Peyton Place (1972–1974), and the made-for-television movies Murder in Peyton Place (1977) and Peyton Place: The Next Generation (1985).

| Character | Peyton Place (1957) | Return to Peyton Place (1961) | Peyton Place (1964–1969) | Return to Peyton Place (1972–1974) | Murder in Peyton Place (1977) | Peyton Place: The Next Generation (1985) |
|---|---|---|---|---|---|---|
| Constance MacKenzie | Lana Turner | Eleanor Parker | Dorothy Malone Lola Albright | Bettye Ackerman Susan Brown | Dorothy Malone | Dorothy Malone |
| Allison MacKenzie | Diane Varsi | Carol Lynley | Mia Farrow | Katherine Glass Pamela Susan Shoop | Mentioned | Mentioned |
| Michael Rossi | Lee Philips | Robert Sterling | Ed Nelson | Guy Stockwell | Ed Nelson | Ed Nelson |
| Selena Cross | Hope Lange | Tuesday Weld | | Margaret Mason | | |
| Matthew Swain | Lloyd Nolan | | Warner Anderson | | | |
| Rodney Harrington | Barry Coe | | Ryan O'Neal | Lawrence P. Casey Yale Summers | Mentioned | Mentioned |
| Betty Anderson | Terry Moore | | Barbara Parkins | Julie Parrish Lynn Loring | Janet Margolin | Barbara Parkins |
| Leslie Harrington | Leon Ames | | Paul Langton | Stacy Harris Frank Maxwell | | |
| Norman Harrington (Note: Character is originally known as Norman Page in Peyton Place (1957), before being written into the Harrington family in subsequent adaptations.) | Russ Tamblyn | | Christopher Connelly | Ron Russell | Christopher Connelly | Christopher Connelly |
| Eli Carson | | | Frank Ferguson | Frank Ferguson | | |
| Elliot Carson | | | Tim O'Connor | Warren Stevens | Tim O'Connor | Tim O'Connor |
| Ada Jacks | | | Evelyn Scott | Evelyn Scott | | Evelyn Scott |
| Rita Jacks | | | Patricia Morrow | Patricia Morrow | | Patricia Morrow |
| Steven Cord | | | James Douglas | Joseph Gallison | David Hedison | James Douglas |
| Hannah Cord | | | Ruth Warrick | Mary K. Wells | | Ruth Warrick |
| Stella Chernak | | | Lee Grant | | Stella Stevens | |
| Jill Smith | | | Joyce Jillson | | Joyce Jillson | |

== Cultural references ==
- In the 1968 single "Harper Valley PTA", performed by Jeannie C. Riley, the central character, the widowed Mrs. Johnson, exposes the various scandals of the members of the titular PTA, then describes the PTA as "just a little Peyton Place."
- The novel and series are mentioned in the 1975 novel 'Salem's Lot and its foreword by Stephen King. The novel is also mentioned in King's book 11/22/63 and the novella The Library Policeman.
- In the 1989 single "We Didn't Start the Fire" by Billy Joel, Peyton Place was mentioned as a significant event of 1956.

== See also ==
- Illegitimacy in fiction
