= Return to Peyton Place (TV series) =

- Original cast of Return to Peyton Place; Front row: Ben Andrews, Ron Russell, Pat Morrow, Larry Casey, Julie Parrish, Warren Stevens, Kathy Glass, John Levin, Bettye Ackerman, Evelyn Scott, Guy Stockwell; Back row: Stacy Harris, Frank Ferguson, Joe Gallison, Mary K. Wells
- Country of origin: United States
- No. of seasons: 3
- No. of episodes: 425 + 1 primetime special

Production
- Running time: 30 minutes
- Production companies: 20th Century Fox Television; FMC Productions

Original release
- Network: NBC
- Release: April 3, 1972 – January 4, 1974

Return to Peyton Place is an American daytime serial that aired on NBC from April 3, 1972 to January 4, 1974. The series was a spin-off of the prime time drama series Peyton Place, and not an adaptation of the 1959 novel by Grace Metalious or the 1961 film of the same name.

While the show continued storylines from Peyton Place, nearly all characters were recast with new actors, with the exception of Frank Ferguson, Evelyn Scott and Patricia Morrow, who reprised their roles as Eli Carson, Ada Jacks and Rita Jacks Harrington respectively.

Selena Cross, who was a major character in the original novel and films Peyton Place and Return to Peyton Place, was added to the show halfway through its first year. She was not included in the original primetime series as her storyline (where she was raped by her stepfather) was considered too risqué for television at the time.

== Plot ==
=== Benny & Jason Tate ===
The original main focuses of the show were Betty Anderson, Rodney Harrington, Constance MacKenzie, Elliot Carson, Allison MacKenzie, and Leslie Harrington. In the beginning, Michael Rossi was revealed not to be guilty for the murder he was on trial for at the end of Peyton Place. Allison returned to town following an absence of three years, during which time she had seen life. A mysterious figure, Benny Tate, follows her and they marry. Benny, however, was suffering from a terminal disease and told his brother Jason about this, explaining he could no longer be with Allison. Instead of helping his brother, Jason followed Benny to town and took Benny's identity. Unlike Benny, Jason was very tough and treated Allison very badly. The constant beating led Allison to a drug addiction, which she eventually kicked. Nevertheless, she retained her vulnerability. She started working for the town newspaper and was involved in an ecology project.

One day, Allison decided she had had enough and tried to run from Jason, who she still thought was Benny. He decided to take revenge by kidnapping her, taking Allison to a cabin by the lake. There, Allison took LSD, and during a psychedelic experience, she took Elliot's gun and shot at Benny. Afterwards, she escaped from the cabin and looked for help nearby. Sometime later, she found out the cabin was burned down, with a body still inside. Allison admitted she shot Benny and was charged with second degree murder.

To avoid Allison being sentenced, Rodney went back to the village where the cabin was situated. He met Benny and Jason's mother Zoe, who knew that Allison had actually been living with Jason, but thought that Allison was aware of this. Benny eventually confessed to the murder of his brother, explaining he found out about Jason's scheme shortly after Allison's arrival at the cabin. He traveled to the cabin to confront his brother, and following a fight, shot Jason to death. Shortly after admitting the truth, Benny died from his disease and Allison was released from prison.

=== Connie, Michael & Selena love triangle ===
Warren Stevens, Bettye Ackerman, and Guy Stockwell as Elliot, Connie, and Michael

By the time Allison was still serving a prison sentence, Elliot wanted to confess to the murder so his daughter would be released from prison. However, Connie would not let her husband do so, thereby creating a wedge between them. Elliot became very unloving to his wife and he started an affair with D. B. Bentley. D. B. turned out using Elliot in favor of her company and lost interest in him when she achieved her goal. Elliot and Connie were estranged from each other and Elliot temporarily left town, with Connie staying behind.

A July 1973 article reported that Selena was about to marry Michael. In late 1973, Michael and Selena married each other. The night before Michael and Selena married, Michael spent the night with Connie. Selena confronted Connie with this rumor, which was actually the truth, and following a heated argument, Selena pushed Connie off the stairs, causing Connie to be hospitalized. Connie later covered for Selena, not wanting to ruin her reputation. Connie later turned out to be pregnant and told Michael he was the father. Partly because the baby was injured during Connie's fall, they agreed to a secret abortion. Shortly after this incident, Elliot returned from Paris to Peyton Place and expressed his interest in a reconciliation. Despite Connie and Matthew's issues with abandonment, Elliot was eventually welcomed back into his home.

Meanwhile, Michael still was in love with Connie and told her he was willing to divorce Selena to marry her. Selena realized her husband was in love with Connie and tried to distract his attention to her by planning a vacation. However, Michael made up tons of excuses not to leave town. Realizing her son is in desperate need of attention from Elliot, Connie told Michael they could never be together. Afterwards, Michael and Selena left town for St. Croix.

=== Life on the wharf ===
In mid-1973, Rita took over her mother Ada's bar near the wharf and hired student waitress Monica Bell, with whom she soon started competing. Rita was jealous of Monica, who was able to combine her studies with being a waitress. Rita started spending most of her time at the bar, turning it into a nightspot which appealed to students. This was much to Norman's upset, who felt he was becoming estranged from his wife.

A sub-plot involved Tom Dana, a mysterious doctor. He admitted to Monica he accidentally caused a car accident a year earlier, which injured and later killed his girlfriend Ellen, who was D. B.'s cousin. He was accused of having killed Ellen, because he put her in such a position after the accident, which prohibited her from breathing. A trial followed, during which Tom was charged with murder, the motive being not wanting to become a father, considering Ellen was pregnant at the time. He was found guilty of manslaughter but the medical board soon acquitted him. Monica tried to help him land a job at the local hospital, but Dr. Rossi and Allison were reluctant to hire him, because of the news reports on his past. This angered Monica, who felt they should have believed in Tom's innocence. Monica eventually went out to investigate the incident herself and proved Tom's innocence. With his name finally cleared, Tom was able to focus on his personal life and he planned on marrying Monica.

In the end of the series, Rita became pregnant and, although she was diagnosed with anemia, gave birth to a healthy boy. Norman feared the health of his wife and was overjoyed with happiness following the labor.

=== Betty, Rodney & Steven love triangle ===
Meanwhile, Betty was still married to Rodney, but they grew estranged from each other. This was much to the anger of Martin Peyton, Rodney's very powerful grandfather who staged his own death a few years earlier. Only few people were aware of Martin Peyton's situation, including Betty and Hannah. Betty has had a son, Peyton, by Steven, but refused to let him see him. She let everyone believe that Peyton was Rodney's son and when Steven found out about this, he threatened to reveal the true parentage of Peyton. Hannah discouraged her son from doing so, explaining Peyton would lose the family fortune if it turned out he was not Rodney's son. By keeping quiet, Steven was allowed to scheme Rodney out of his company so he could take over, thereby becoming the leader of Martin Peyton's company.

Rodney and Betty eventually divorced so Rodney could marry Allison, who had accepted his proposal. Rodney had accepted his inheritance only to have money to bail out Allison, who was at this time still in jail for Benny Tate's murder. In the meantime, Betty fell in love with Steven, which was boosted by his recently acquired power and wealth. Steven and Betty planned on marrying each other, which worried D. B. Bentley, who thought the quick marriage could hurt Steven's career. Despite Betty's claim that D. B. was only discouraging Steven from the marriage because she wanted him for herself, Steven followed D. B.'s advice. D. B. indeed attempted to seduce Steven, but Steven noticed D. B. was only doing this to use him for her company, and pretended to fall for her to use her for his company instead. Steven was also occupied ruining Rodney's career most of the time.

Near the end of the series, D. B. was still trying to break up Steven and Betty. Steven realized he could lose Betty if he continued on meeting D. B. and broke contact. He and Betty wanted to leave for the Caribbean to marry. This gladdened Rodney and Allison, who felt they could not plan a wedding until Steven and Betty left. However, before all of this could happen, Martin Peyton announced he was finally returning to town to prohibit the marriages from taking place. With this announcement, the soap opera ended its run.

== Cast ==
=== Original cast members ===
Constance MacKenzie Carson (Bettye Ackerman, April 3 – November 1972; Susan Brown, November 18, 1972 – January 4, 1974)
The owner of the town bookstore. She is the wife of Elliot Carson, and mother of Allison MacKenzie and Matthew Carson. Previously played by Dorothy Malone and Lola Albright in Peyton Place.
Elliot Carson (Warren Stevens, April 3, 1972 – January 4, 1974, entire run)
The editor-publisher of the Peyton Place Clarion. He is the husband of Constance, and father of Matthew Carson. Previously played by Tim O'Connor in Peyton Place.
Allison MacKenzie Tate (Katherine Glass, April 3, 1972 – March 1973; Pamela Susan Shoop, March 13, 1973 – January 4, 1974)
The illegitimate daughter of Constance and Elliot. She has returned to Peyton Place after three years, having run away after discovering her father's real identity. Previously played by Mia Farrow in Peyton Place.
Eli Carson (Frank Ferguson, April 3, 1972 – January 4, 1974, entire run)
The owner of the town's general store, and father of Elliot, who offers fatherly advice to the townspeople.
Rodney Harrington (Lawrence P. Casey, April 3 – May 1972; Yale Summers June 8, 1972 – January 4, 1974)
The nephew of Martin Peyton, the town founder, who inherited his fortune but refused to accept it. He is married to Betty Anderson for the second time. Previously played by Ryan O'Neal in Peyton Place.
Norman Harrington (Ron Russell, April 3, 1972 – January 4, 1974, entire run)
Rodney's brother and co-owner of their fishing boat business. He is the husband of Rita Jacks, they share a three-year-old daughter, Laurie. Previously played by Christopher Connelly in Peyton Place.
Betty Anderson Harrington (Julie Parrish, April 3, 1972 – December 1973; Lynn Loring, December 1973 – January 4, 1974)
Rodney's wife, who was once married to Steven Cord. She is unhappy with the simple life, and she and Rodney have recently separated. Previously played by Barbara Parkins in Peyton Place.
Rita Jacks Harrington (Patricia Morrow, April 3, 1972 – January 4, 1974, entire run)
Norman's wife, and mother of Laurie. She lives to please her husband and is always by his side. She takes over her mother Ada's bar after she leaves.
Leslie Harrington (Stacy Harris, April 3, 1972 – March 1973; Frank Maxwell, March 28, 1973 – January 1974)
Norman and Rodney's father, who was once powerful and wealthy. He has been alienated by his sons, but hopes by persuading Rodney to accept his inheritance, he will gain power again. Previously played by Paul Langton in Peyton Place.
Ada Jacks (Evelyn Scott, April 3, 1972 – June 1973)
Rita's mother, and owner of Ada Jack's Tavern, a bar by the waterfront.
Dr. Michael Rossi (Guy Stockwell, April 3, 1972 – January 4, 1974, entire run)
The town doctor and confidante who has been involved with several women. Previously played by Ed Nelson in Peyton Place.
Steven Cord (Joseph Gallison, April 3, 1972 – January 4, 1974, entire run)
The illegitimate son of Martin Peyton's daughter, raised as the son of Hannah Cord. Once married to Betty, he is now a lawyer for the Peyton estate. Previously played by James Douglas in Peyton Place.
Hannah Cord (Mary K. Wells, April 3, 1972 – January 4, 1974, entire run)
One time mistress and housekeeper for Martin Peyton, she raised Steven Cord as her own son. Previously played by Ruth Warrick in Peyton Place.
Matthew Carson (John Levin, April 24, 1972 – January 4, 1974)
Three-year-old son of Constance and Elliot Carson. Previously played by child actors Derek Camp and Derek Schultz in Peyton Place.
Benny Tate (Ben Andrews, April 25, 1972 – 1973)
A mysterious, menacing figure from Allison's three-year disappearance, who claims to be her husband. Andrews also plays Jason Tate, his villainous brother.

=== Later additions ===
Martin Peyton (John Hoyt, May 1972 – January 4, 1974)
The powerful and intimidating grandfather of Rodney and Norman Harrington and Steven Cord. Presumed dead in the original series, it turns out he has staged his own death. Previously played by George Macready and Wilfrid Hyde-White in Peyton Place.
Selena Cross Rossi (Margaret Mason, November 18, 1972 – January 4, 1974)
A young woman with a troubled past, she marries Michael Rossi.
Gino Panzini (Dino Fantini, November 1972 – April 1973)
A friend of Benny Tate.
Dr. Wells (Alex Nicol, 1972 – 1973)
Ed Ryker (Chuck Daniel, 1972 – 1973)
Monica Bell (Betty Ann Carr, May 1973 – January 4, 1974)
A college student who starts working at Ada's Tavern, now owned by Rita. Rita soon grows jealous of Monica's charm.
D. B. Bentley (Mary Frann, 1973 – January 4, 1974)
The chief executive of an international oil complex, D. B. uses her looks and sex appeal for her own favor. During her stay in Peyton Place, she charmed several men, including Elliot and Steven.
Bob Whitmore (Rudy Solari, 1973)
A young man who is in love with Allison. This love, however, remains unrequited.
Tom Dana (Charles Sailor, 1973 – January 4, 1974)
A mysterious doctor who previously caused a car accident, killing his girlfriend Ellen. He was charged with murder, but he was soon released from prison.
Nell Abernathy (Mary Jackson, 1973–1974)
Mr. Blake (James Doohan, summer 1973)

== Production ==
=== Development ===
The daytime version of Peyton Place was initially limited to 15 regular cast members, with producers concerned that the primetime version eventually failed due to its large cast, which could confuse new viewers. Its launch was highly publicised, with thousands of actors testing for the role of Allison MacKenzie, previously played by Mia Farrow. Following a long search, Kathy Glass was cast, with scriptwriter James Lipton calling her "one of the most gifted actors I've ever worked with. She has incredible flexibility; there's almost nothing she can't do. She has an emotional suppleness you encounter very rarely in an actress of any age. To find this in an actress is like finding a treasure." Glass eventually asked to be released from her contract and was replaced by Pamela Susan Shoop, who made her first appearance on March 13, 1973.

Patricia Morrow, who also appeared in the primetime version, initially declined the role, saying she could not combine working five days a week on the show with law school. However, she accepted a contract of two working days a week which she motivated her return: "I really can't turn down money. I have to use what earning power I have right now. Actress Julie Parrish, who played Betty and was named by the media as one of the most promising actresses of the soap, recalled working on the show was very tough, and she admitted she had a breakdown one day on the set.

In August 1972, Gail Kobe took over as the executive producer of the show. On November 18, 1972, Susan Brown replaced Ackerman as Constance MacKenzie, and Margaret Mason first appeared as Selena Cross. Mary Frann and Charles Sailor joined the cast full-time in June 1973, after Frann made her first appearance on May 18, 1973.

=== Prime-time special ===
A prime-time special recapping the climax of the apparent murder of Benny Tate aired on Sunday, January 21, 1973 after Columbo. This was the first time a daytime soap opera reran an episode in the evening slot, and ranked 58th with a 12.9 rating.

=== Ratings ===
Return to Peyton Place replaced Bright Promise on NBC's schedule at 3:30 pm (2:30 central time), following Another World, which was winning its timeslot. While the series performed much better than its predecessor against ABC's One Life to Live or CBS's The Edge of Night, it still landed third in the time slot ratings-wise.

By July 1973, CBS debuted Match Game 73 in the 3:30 pm slot, due to The Edge of Night moving to 2:30 pm one hour earlier because the shows owner P&G wanted a daily marathon of its soaps this also effected the timeslot its other soap Guiding Light moving to 2pm. Match Game 73 would become daytime's top-rated program. In response, NBC announced the cancellation of Return to Peyton Place in November 1973, in favor of How to Survive a Marriage, which proved less successful then its predecessors Return to Peyton Place and Bright Promise. That show was cancelled fifteen months later after a move to 1:30 pm accommodating Another World the first soap to expand to an hour in length. Actor Ron Russell, who portrayed Norman Harrington, claimed this was due to the show's initial pacing issues, describing the first year and half of the show "the slowest-moving daytime drama in history."

=== Peyton Place '79 pilot ===
Years after the show's cancellation and the 1977 television movie Murder in Peyton Place, Fox commissioned a one-hour pilot for syndication titled Peyton Place '79, written by Don Wallace and produced by David Lawrence under his Castle Combe Productions banner. Cast members included Adam West, Don Matheson and Elaine Princi. Jean Bruce Scott, who went on to appear as a stand-in for Mia Farrow's character Allison MacKenzie in Peyton Place: The Next Generation, played the character of Spring MacKenzie, who has an incestuous desire for her brother, played by Morgan Stevens, and steals her mother's boyfriend, played by Mark Pinter. However, ultimately the pilot was not picked up.
