= Peyton Place: The Next Generation =

- Title screenshot
- Genre: Drama; Romance
- Written by: Rita Lakin
- Directed by: Larry Elikann
- Starring: Christopher Connelly; James Douglas; Dorothy Malone; Patricia Morrow; Ed Nelson; Tim O'Connor; Barbara Parkins; Evelyn Scott; Ruth Warrick
- Music by: Jerrold Immel
- Country of origin: United States
- Original language: English

Production
- Executive producer: Michael Filerman
- Producer: Terry Morse Jr.
- Production location: Waxahachie, Texas
- Cinematography: Neil Roach
- Editors: Stanford Tischler; Stuart Bass
- Running time: 100 minutes
- Production company: 20th Century Fox Television

Original release
- Network: NBC
- Release: May 13, 1985

Related
- Peyton Place; Murder in Peyton Place

Peyton Place: The Next Generation is a 1985 American made-for-television drama film directed by Larry Elikann. The film premiered on NBC on May 13, 1985. The film is based on the 1964–1969 television series Peyton Place and the plot is set twenty years after the original series. The film contains many of the original cast members, and there were hopes of it inspiring a television series, but such a program was never made.

== Plot ==
A young, blonde woman, very much resembling Allison MacKenzie - who had disappeared years ago - arrives in town, and startles Allison's mother Constance (Dorothy Malone). She identifies herself as Megan MacKenzie (Marguerite Hickey), Allison's long-lost daughter who believes that she was conceived during a night when Allison was raped, severely beaten and left for dead in a ditch. Megan is immediately taken in by Constance and Elliot Carson (Tim O'Connor), and she tells them that Allison has been in a Boston mental institution for 20 years now. She has not spoken a word since she entered the institution till Megan her visited recently. That was when Allison uttered, "Peyton Place".

Megan becomes involved with Dana Harrington (Bruce Greenwood), the son of Betty Anderson (Barbara Parkins) and the late Rodney Harrington - who died in 1980. Much to Dana's dissatisfaction, Betty is now engaged to Dorian Blake (John Beck), and together they live in the mansion that once belonged to Rodney's grandfather Martin Peyton, with Peyton's loyal housekeeper Hannah Cord (Ruth Warrick), with whom Betty does not get along. Dana's connection with Megan affects his relationship with Kelly Carson (Deborah Goodrich), who lives with Constance and Elliot and is less than happy with Megan's arrival.

Some residents, including Norman (Christopher Connelly), Rita (Patricia Morrow) and Ada (Evelyn Scott) suspect that Rodney was Megan's father. Norman and Rita's son Joey (Tony Quinn) overhears this, and soon everyone knows. Believing that they are half brother and sister, Megan and Dana immediately end their relationship. Kelly is overjoyed when she finds out, but Dana wants nothing to do with her anymore, and they get into a quarrel, which leads to a car accident. Dana is arrested for speeding, and Dorian, fed up with his behavior, forces him to work in the mill, where Dana is bullied by the co-workers because of his background. Kelly realizes that she has no future with Dana and reluctantly elopes with Joey.

Meanwhile, Allison is relocated to the Peyton Hospital, where her parents try to have contact with her. One night, she is strangled to death by someone, and the next day she is found hanging. The police overrule her death as a suicide, but lawyer Steven Cord (James Douglas) believes that she could never hang herself and suspects that she was murdered. He travels to the farm where she was found in a ditch 21 years earlier, and the owner (Lou Hancock) tells him that around the same time, a Boston University student was working for her. He disappeared shortly after the rape, and was never questioned by the police.

Steven believes that this man has raped Allison, and through Elliot's newspaper archive, he finds out that the man is Dorian. At the same time, Dorian harasses Megan. Scared, she calls Dana for help, and afterwards goes outside, where Dorian attempts to run over her with his car. Afterwards, Dorian returns home, where he finds out through the news that Megan is still alive, but in critical condition. He calls the hospital for further details on Megan's condition, which confuses Betty, who tries to understand why her husband is so taken with the girl. When Dorian admits to having raped Allison, Betty tries to run away into the woods, but he catches her and almost pushes her off a cliff.

However, Steven arrives around the same time at the cliff, and after a struggle, Dorian is pushed off and falls to his death. Steven takes Betty back home, where she reveals that he is Dana's biological father. She explains that she kept this a secret to assure that Dana would inherit Peyton's estate. Steven is initially upset with Betty, but he later forgives her, and then bonds with his son. Dana next goes to the hospital, where he tells Megan that they are not related, after which they kiss.

== Cast ==
Starring

- Christopher Connelly as Norman Harrington, Rita's husband and Joey's father.
- James Douglas as Steven Cord, a lawyer at law, who since breaking up with Betty, has become the town drunk. Eventually revealed to be Dana's father.
- Dorothy Malone as Constance MacKenzie, Elliot's wife who has long been searching for her missing daughter Allison. She now takes care of Kelly, and also offers Megan a home.
- Pat Morrow as Rita Harrington, Norman's wife and Joey's mother.
- Ed Nelson as Michael Rossi, a doctor at the Peyton Hospital, who is keeping a secret that affects Dana.
- Tim O'Connor as Elliot Carson, Constance's husband who works for the local newspaper.
- Barbara Parkins as Betty Anderson, Dana's mother who has recently become engaged with Dorian. She carries a secret about Dana's father.
- Evelyn Scott as Ada Jacks, Rita's mother and the owner of a local tavern.
- Ruth Warrick as Hannah Cord, the housekeeper of the Peyton mansion and caretaker of Dana. Later her son, Steven is revealed to be the boy's father.

"The Next Generation"

- Deborah Goodrich as Kelly Carson, Dana's vicious and spoiled girlfriend. She is Constance and Elliot's daughter & Allison's sister. She struggles with the burden of standing in Allison's shadow.
- Bruce Greenwood as Dana Harrington, Betty's rebellious son with a wealthy background. He has a relationship with Kelly, but falls in love with Megan. His father is revealed to be Steven Cord.
- Marguerite Hickey as Megan MacKenzie, Allison's 20-year-old daughter who becomes the love interest of Dana. Despite her tough childhood - growing up mostly in orphanages - she is described as sweet and caring.
- Tony Quinn as Joey Harrington, Norman and Rita's teenage son who is in love with Kelly.
- John Beck as Dorian Blake, Betty's strict and demanding fiance, who does not get along with Dana.

== Production ==
In June 1984, it was reported that executive producer Michael Filerman was in charge of the TV film Peyton Place: The Next Generation, and that writer Rita Lakin was penning the script. Filerman revealed that Barbara Parkins, Ed Nelson, Ruth Warrick and James Douglas had already showed interest in reprising their role. Furthermore, Lana Turner was approached to play the same role that she enacted in the original 1957 film, but the part eventually went to Dorothy Malone, who portrayed Constance MacKenzie in the soap opera. Malone was "overjoyed at the prospect of rejoining her old friends and stepping back into her past."

In December 1984, it was announced that production was set to begin in February 1985, with a cast including Parkins, Leslie Nielsen, Nelson and Warrick. Whereas Parkins refused to appear in the show's precedent TV film Murder in Peyton Place (1977), she "was quick to agree to the reunion show." She admitted that she did not like the first script, until several rewrites were made in December 1984. Furthermore, Nelson exclaimed that he was "thrilled" to return. His real life son was set to play his son in the film, but he ultimately did not appear in the film. Shooting was set to commence in either Dallas or Vancouver. Nielsen did not appear in the film. The producers hoped to inspire a TV series with this movie, and therefore it was also promoted as a television pilot.

Filerman believed that they were "going to capture a big audience that fondly remembers the series and the excitement it created at the time." He also explained that there were too many actors in the original series to bring back in the film. As with Murder in Peyton Place, Mia Farrow and Ryan O'Neal were not approached to reprise their roles, because the crew thought that they would not be interested and that they "would've cost too much."

Actor Christopher Connelly, who had a large role in Murder in Peyton Place, had only little to do in this film, to which Connelly publicly has exclaimed his disappointment. Most of the attention went to 'the new generation', which included Deborah Goodrich, Bruce Greenwood and Marguerite Hickey. Parkins recalled that filming with her former colleagues was "strange", and said that it was "hard work in a strange atmosphere."

== Reception ==
One reviewer wrote that "it all seems confusing at first, especially if you didn't see the original Peyton Place series. But by the time it's half over, you can easily predict how most of the dilemmas will be solved. [...] Despite nostalgia and raunchiness, this program doesn't work."

Other critics complained that this TV movie only held appeal for viewers who had watched the original series, and that it was tame compared to contemporary nighttime soaps such as Dallas and Dynasty.
