= Return to Peyton Place (film) =

1961 film by José Ferrer

- Theatrical release half-sheet display poster
- Directed by: José Ferrer
- Written by: Ronald Alexander
- Based on: Return to Peyton Place by Grace Metalious
- Produced by: Jerry Wald
- Starring: Carol Lynley; Tuesday Weld; Jeff Chandler; Eleanor Parker; Mary Astor; Robert Sterling
- Cinematography: Charles G. Clarke
- Edited by: David Bretherton
- Music by: Franz Waxman
- Distributed by: 20th Century Fox
- Release date: May 5, 1961
- Running time: 123 minutes
- Country: United States
- Language: English
- Budget: $1,785,000
- Box office: $9,996,178 or $4.5 million

Return to Peyton Place is a 1961 American drama film in color by De Luxe and CinemaScope, produced by Jerry Wald, directed by José Ferrer, and starring Carol Lynley, Tuesday Weld, Jeff Chandler, Eleanor Parker, Mary Astor, and Robert Sterling. The screenplay by Ronald Alexander is based on the 1959 novel Return to Peyton Place by Grace Metalious. The film was distributed by 20th Century Fox and is a sequel to their earlier film Peyton Place (1957).

The film's storyline centers on the life and loves of bestselling author Allison MacKenzie. She has followed in the footsteps of her mother Constance by having an affair with a married man, her publisher Lewis Jackman (Chandler). She goes on to publish a tell-all novel that fictionalizes the scandal, homicide, suicide, incest, and moral hypocrisy that belies the tranquil façade of her hometown. She is quickly criticized by friends, family, and neighbors as a result.

== Plot ==
The film takes place some eight to ten years after the events of the original film.

Allison MacKenzie receives a phone call from publisher Lewis Jackman, who shows interest in publishing her book, promising to turn her into a household name whose books are exclusively bestsellers. Allison is ecstatic after hearing the news. Her best friend Selena Cross, however, continues to receive a lot of criticism from the townspeople for her "shameful" past.

Among these criticizing her is Mrs. Roberta Carter, an old-fashioned, domineering woman who is unhappy that her son Ted has a close bond with Selena. Later that day, Mrs. Carter is visited by her son, who is in town while visiting from Boston. He surprises her with the shocking news of his having impulsively married a former Italian fashion model, Raffaella. Mrs. Carter looks down on the foreigner and contacts Selena with the couple's news, with the hope that Selena will drive the couple apart. Selena sees through Mrs. Carter's scheme and refuses, angrily leaving and getting herself involved in a car accident. At the accident scene, young ski instructor Nils Larsen helps Selena, and although she initially treats him coldly, she feels attracted to him.

Meanwhile, Constance reluctantly allows her daughter to visit New York for a meeting with her publisher, Lewis. Allison is unhappy when she finds out that he wants to make changes to her book, but she finally agrees to cooperate. Constance calls the next morning and discovers that Allison and Lewis have been working together all night, so she immediately suspects the worst.

Back in Peyton Place, Raffaella threatens to ban Ted's mother from their life, if she continues to treat her horribly. Raffaella and Ted go skiing later that day, and Ted is surprised to see Selena with Nils. Selena finally agreed to date him after bumping into him several more times following the accident.

During the following weeks, Allison spends her time promoting her book, doing TV talk shows and radio show interviews. She is slowly turned into a celebrity, and she is continually with Lewis. She is angry after their time together to discover that he is married, but after she receives the first copy of her book, she kisses him. The book soon becomes a commercial success due to its scandalous contents.

In Peyton Place the book is heavily criticized by its townspeople. Constance is soon disappointed with Allison for allowing so many changes to be made during the book's editing process. Selena is disgusted by the way she is portrayed in the book. She loses her mind, as a result, and strikes Nils with a fireplace poker, having flashed back to her past trauma and confusing him with Luke, her abuser.

Meanwhile, Mike Rossi, principal of the local high school, husband of Constance and the only defender of Allison's book, risks being discharged by the head of the school board, Mrs. Carter, for refusing to remove Allison's book from the school library. At the Carter home, Ted confronts Raffaella about her quarrel with his mother. Realizing that Ted will never stand up to his mother, Raffaella reveals she is pregnant, before angrily leaving him. Determined, now, to terminate her pregnancy, she purposely causes a skiing accident to end it.

When Allison finds out Mike has been fired, she decides to face the wrath of Peyton Place's residents. They are still incensed by their barely disguised fictional counterparts and her book's revelations of the town's many secrets. She is immediately confronted by her mother for having sold her decency and self-respect for success and money. Despite the quarrel with her mother, Allison decides to support Mike, who has taken his case of being fired directly to Peyton Place's town hall.

Among the people defending Mike are Lewis, Nils, and Ted. Nils points out that the bigoted townspeople have now driven away Selena, who is nowhere to be found, revealing his hope to marry her if she ever returns to Peyton Place. Selena returns and blames the small-minded townspeople for making her feel ashamed, while thanking Allison for having written the truth about their hypocrisy. In the end Roberta is denounced and Mike is given back his job after Constance publicly points out that the older, bigoted townspeople have been manipulating the lives of their children for far too long.

Afterwards, Allison, having emotionally matured and become an adult, breaks off her affair with Lewis, explaining that she does not want to ruin his marriage. She decides to leave Peyton Place to start a new life elsewhere.

== Cast ==
- Carol Lynley as Allison MacKenzie, a stubborn young writer who agrees to turn her book into a controversial, tell-all novel in order to become famous and successful.
- Jeff Chandler as Lewis Jackman, a married editor and publisher, who helps Allison become a celebrity, while they have a romantic affair.
- Eleanor Parker as Constance Rossi, Allison's overprotective mother and wife of Mike, who is upset about her daughter's novel. She changes her mind, however, and later defends her daughter.
- Mary Astor as Mrs. Roberta Carter, a snobbish, domineering woman who is reluctant to allow her son to lead his own life and is among the people boycotting Allison's novel.
- Robert Sterling as Mike Rossi, the high school principal and husband of Constance, and one of the few locals supporting Allison's novel.
- Luciana Paluzzi as Raffaella Carter, a former Italian fashion model and the current pregnant wife of Ted, who deals with the constant judgment and criticism of her mother-in-law.
- Brett Halsey as Theodore "Ted" Carter, the son of Roberta, who is afraid to stand up to his mother's dominant behavior.
- Gunnar Hellström as Nils Larsen, a ski instructor who constantly bumps into Selena, resulting in a romantic relationship.
- Tuesday Weld as Selena Cross, Allison's best friend, a former rape victim by her stepfather, who is still looked down upon by various judgemental townspeople because of her past.

== Production ==
=== Development ===
The 1957 screen adaptation of Metalious' first novel had been a critical and commercial success, ranking second at the box office and garnering nine Academy Award nominations. Film rights to the sequel were sold to Fox for $500,000 before a word of the novel had been written. This amount also meant Fox owned the film rights to Metalious' second novel, The Tight White Collar. This was part of a long range plan: Buddy Adler, head of production at Fox, was paying authors in advance to write novels that he could turn into films.

=== Casting ===
Fox wanted Diane Varsi to reprise her role of Allison MacKenzie. However, in March 1959, Varsi announced she was walking out on Hollywood, despite being only two years into a seven-year contract with the studio. "Acting is destructive to me", she said. "I don't see any reason to be made miserable just because other people say I should go on with my career".

In June 1959, Hedda Hopper announced that Margaret Leighton would play a woman who tries to kill her daughter-in-law. Producer Jerry Wald was hopeful that Varsi would play Allison but said Diane Baker was a possible back up. Lana Turner had already passed the role of Constance MacKenzie, which was then offered to Joan Crawford.

In August 1959, Wald announced Varsi was not reprising her role, and that he was planning on replacing her with Anna Maria Alberghetti, with production slated to begin in November 1959. By that time, producer Buddy Adler had already cast Robert Evans as Nils Larsen. Both Alberghetti and Evans were eventually replaced.

While shooting Hound-Dog Man in the fall of 1959, Wald met Carol Lynley. With no announcement of Baker's withdrawal, Wald announced in September 1959 that Lynley was set to star as Allison MacKenzie. Despite rumors that Varsi changed her mind and was signed on after all, Lynley eventually was cast. When Wald was later asked about a possible return of Varsi, he responded: "Ridiculous. She hasn't been back to Hollywood since she left here, and I doubt that she'll ever make another movie again". Brett Halsey was revealed to be among the co-stars in the film. It is doubted if he was cast as Ted, the role he eventually played, because a February 1960 news article reported Dean Stockwell was cast in the role. Later that month, it was reported he was in talks for playing the ski instructor.

In October 1959, Wald announced Hope Lange would return as Selena. By November she had pulled out.

In January 1960, Wald said Stephen Boyd would play Lewis. That month, Joan Crawford was set to play Roberta and he was hoping for Norma Shearer as Constance, with Carol Lynley as Crawford's daughter-in-law and Diane Baker as Allison.

In February 1960, it was reported that Trevor Howard would play a doctor who marries young bride "Stephanie", played by Suzy Parker. By June, Parker's role had been cut from the script; Wald announced that none of the original cast were returning.

The production was stalled in early 1960 through the following summer because of a Hollywood writer's strike. It allowed Wald in June 1960 to travel to the East in order to offer a role in the film to Mary Ure, a stage actress. He announced he was planning to delay production until September 1960 "to avoid the influx of tourists".

When Norma Shearer declined the role of Constance, Bette Davis was offered the part in October 1960, but she had to turn it down due to previous Broadway commitments. At one point in late 1960, Gene Tierney and Lee Remick were cast in the starring roles, but it was reported in November 1960 that both withdrew due to pregnancy.

Eventually in November 1960, Eleanor Parker was cast as Constance. Parker said she would "probably do it differently" than Turner. Lynley was cast as her daughter.

In December 1960, Tuesday Weld replaced Lois Smith as Selena Cross at the last minute, while Luciana Paluzzi took over Barbara Steele's role as Ted's wife. By this time, Crawford also pulled out as Mrs. Roberta Carter, saying she did not want to work over the Christmas holiday and be away from her family, and Davis was unsuccessfully approached as her replacement. Mary Astor was cast in the role.

=== Script ===
In August 1959, Irene Kamp was reportedly working on the script. In September, Walter Reisch was working on it.

The novel came out in November 1959. The New York Times called it "so labored, so repetitious of its predecessor (both literally and in terms of more of the same) that it can scarcely reward even the thrill seeker".

=== Shooting ===
The film was shot in CinemaScope on location in Fitchburg, Massachusetts. Shooting began in the Winter of 1960. However, some of Astor's scenes were cut before the final release. After failing to have Michael Rossi discharged, she goes home and burns her house down in order to kill Ted and his wife. In the trailer for the film we see the fire, but not in the film itself. There is even a reference to a fire, exactly as one character refers to it.

Return to Peyton Place was the last Fox film to shoot on what was known as "the permanent garden set". This had been built in 1935 and was sold off in 1961 for real estate development.

=== Music ===
The film's theme, "The Wonderful Season of Love," was written by Paul Francis Webster and Franz Waxman and performed by Ferrer's then-wife Rosemary Clooney. The soundtrack was later released on CD by Varèse Sarabande, and the film is available on DVD.

== Reception ==
=== Critical reception ===
Variety described the film as "a high-class soap opera" and added, "José Ferrer's direction of this material is deliberate, but restrained and perceptive... The lovely Lynley does a thoroughly capable job, although a shade more animation would have been desirable. But it is the veteran Astor who walks off with the picture". Bosley Crowther of The New York Times praised Mary Astor, but wrote, "... the script of Ronald Alexander is simply shallow and diffuse, and the direction of José Ferrer does very little to improve on those qualities".

TV Guide said, "the story and its themes tend to evolve to a predictable ending. Astor is marvelous in her role as the overbearing mother... and Weld, virtually unknown at the time, starred in a role that displayed her natural sex appeal".

Robert Firsching of AllMovie said the film was "sillier than the original, adding to its problems by completely recasting all the roles, combining several of them into existing characters". Calling it "overwrought and overblown", he said "the film is still a treat for fans of campy 'suburban sin' melodramas".

=== Box office ===
The film grossed $9,996,178 in the US, far less than the $25,600,000 earned by its predecessor, but still a profit-earner for Fox. It was the 15th highest-grossing movie of the year.

== See also ==
- List of American films of 1961
