= The Stripper (film) =

1963 film by Franklin J. Schaffner

- Theatrical release poster
- Directed by: Franklin J. Schaffner
- Screenplay by: Meade Roberts
- Based on: A Loss of Roses (1959 play) by William Inge
- Produced by: Jerry Wald
- Starring: Joanne Woodward; Richard Beymer; Claire Trevor; Carol Lynley
- Cinematography: Ellsworth Fredericks
- Edited by: Robert L. Simpson
- Music by: Jerry Goldsmith
- Production company: Jerry Wald Productions
- Distributed by: 20th Century-Fox
- Release date: June 19, 1963 (New York City)
- Running time: 95 minutes
- Country: United States
- Language: English
- Budget: $2,175,000 or $2.5 million
- Box office: $1,500,000 (US/ Canada)

The Stripper is a 1963 American drama film about a struggling, aging actress-turned-stripper, played by Joanne Woodward, and the people she knows. It is based on the play A Loss of Roses by William Inge.

This was the feature film debut of director Franklin J. Schaffner, and co-starred Carol Lynley, Robert Webber, and Richard Beymer. Also appearing as Madame Olga was real-life stripper Gypsy Rose Lee. It was the first Schaffner film to feature a score by prolific composer Jerry Goldsmith, who later worked with Schaffner on Planet of the Apes, Patton, Papillon, and The Boys from Brazil.

William Travilla was nominated for the Academy Award for Best Costume Design, Black-and-White.

== Plot ==
Lila Green dreamed of a career in the movies, but has found little success. She joins a group of traveling entertainers and is abandoned near her Kansas hometown by manager and boyfriend Ricky Powers. Old friend Helen Baird takes her into her home, where Helen's young son Kenny becomes infatuated with Lila. Somewhat delusional, she at first sees a future for their relationship, until coming to her senses. Ricky returns and offers Lila a job doing a striptease. In need of money, she accepts. Kenny witnesses her show, and he realizes she is not the dream girl he loved.

== Cast ==
- Joanne Woodward as Lila Green
- Richard Beymer as Kenny Baird
- Claire Trevor as Helen Baird
- Carol Lynley as Miriam Caswell
- Robert Webber as Ricky Powers
- Louis Nye as Ronnie Cavendish
- Gypsy Rose Lee as Madame Olga
- Michael J. Pollard as Jelly
- Sondra Kerr as Edwina
- Susan Brown as Mrs. Mulvaney
- Marlene De Lamater as Sandra Mulvaney
- Ralph Lee as Sonny
- Gary Pagett as Dizzy
- Bing Russell as Mr. Mulvaney

== Production ==
The film was based on a play by William Inge, A Loss of Roses. Inge's first three plays had been turned into success movies - Come Back Little Sheba, Picnic and Bus Stop - and film rights to A Loss of Roses were sold to Buddy Adler of 20th Century Fox before the play was produced for a reported $200,000. The play was a flop despite introducing Warren Beatty in the role of Kenny.

In August 1960 Fox's head of production, Bob Goldstein - who replaced Buddy Adler - assigned the project to Jerry Wald. Alfred Hayes wrote a script and the title was changed to Celebration. Marilyn Monroe and Pat Boone were sought as leads.

Eventually Jose Ferrer was chosen to direct, with Joanne Woodward and Richard Beymer to star (both actors were under contract to Fox). However Ferrer left the project, causing it to be delayed. The job of directing went to Franklin Schaffner, who had worked in television. Schaffner was allowed to develop his own script with Meade Roberts.

Curtis Harrington worked on the movie as associate producer, under Jerry Wald. Harrington later wrote " I had little regard for Beymer, since I found him bland and uninteresting and not a very good actor. But I was thrilled to be able to work with the great Claire Trevor... I was also delighted to be working with Joanne Woodward."

Harrington admired Franklin Schaffner but called screenwriter Meade Robers "the most intensely neurotic writer I had ever met... He had so many nervous tics and mannerisms that I wanted to scream after every meeting with him, but we finally managed to hammer out an acceptable screenplay."

Robert Webber and Michael J Pollard reprised their performances from the original stage play. Carol Lynley's part was referred to in the stage play but not seen.

Filming started 28 May 1962 under the title A Woman in July. Jerry Wald died of a heart attack during the shoot on 13 July 1962

According to Curtis Harrington, Schaffner's original cut included several musical sequences. These were cut out at the behest of Daryl F. Zanuck. Zanuck also insisted on the removal of a scene where Woodward's character tries to commit suicide. " It was a disturbing, brilliantly acted scene, absolutely the dramatic high point of the film," wrote Harrington. "Without it, the attitude of the characters at the end of the film made no sense." Other Zanuck changes included re-instating scenes with Carol Lynley and Richard Beymer that Schaffner had cut.

== Reception ==
Sight and Sound wrote "Meade Roberts’ screenplay, with its stagy dialogue and near-absence of any outside world, shows no particular sense of cinema, and Jerry Goldsmith’s score relentlessly plugs the cliches. Yet despite all this, the film is consistently interesting to look at, and even reveals something of a heart."

Pauline Kael felt the movie "has the dreary, liberal Freudian Sunday School neatness of second-rate serious drama: it’s necessary for the characters to be shallow so that the audience can see them learning their little life’s lessons and changing. Still, Joanne Woodward is at the center of this picture, and everything she does here is worth watching."

== Notes ==
- Kim, Erwin (1985). Franklin J. Schaffner. Scarecrow Press.
- Harrington, Curtis (2007). Nice Guys Don't Work in Hollywood: The Adventures of an Aesthete in the Movie Business. Drag City. ISBN 978-1-937112-07-3.
