= North Haven High School =

Public high school in Connecticut, United States

Location
- 221 Elm Street; North Haven, Connecticut 06473; United States
- Coordinates: 41°22′23″N 72°51′47″W

Information
- Type: Public
- School district: North Haven Public Schools
- Superintendent: Patrick A. Stirk
- CEEB code: 070570
- Principal: Russell Dallai
- Staff: 85.00 (FTE)
- Grades: 9 to 12
- Gender: Co-ed
- Enrollment: 957 (2023–2024)
- Student to teacher ratio: 11.26
- Colors: Maroon and white
- Athletics conference: Southern Connecticut Conference
- Mascot: Nighthawks
- Newspaper: The Phoenix
- Website: nhhs.northhavenschools.org

North Haven High School is a public high school located at 221 Elm Street in North Haven, Connecticut. It has an enrollment of approximately 921 students in grades 9 through 12.

== Notable alumni ==
- Dan Fegan, NBA agent
- Katherine Glass, actress known for Return to Peyton Place, The Doctors, One Life to Live, The Best of Everything
- Paul Householder, MLB player
- Robert Kagan, American historian, author, columnist, and foreign-policy commentator
- Paul Marcarelli, actor known for his commercials at Verizon and T-Mobile
- Tiffany Weimer, soccer player with FC Nordsjælland

== Notable faculty ==
- Rand Pecknold, history teacher and NCAA head hockey coach
