= Ben Andrews =

Ben Andrews may refer to:

- Ben Andrews (actor) (1942–1981), American television actor
- Ben Andrews (mathematician), Australian mathematician
