= Margaret Mason =

American actress

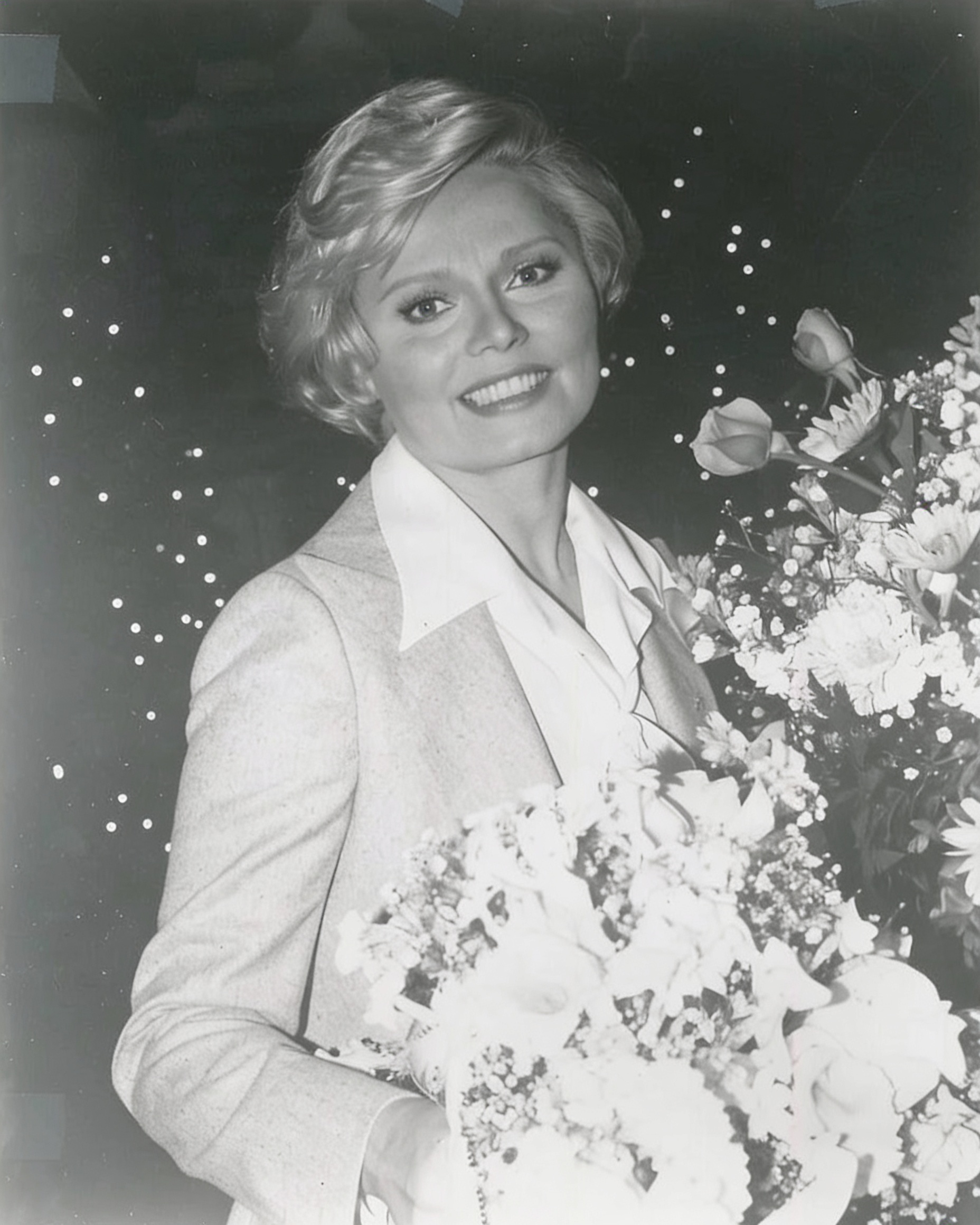
- Born: December 31, 1940; Phoenixville, Pennsylvania, US
- Died: March 26, 1999 (aged 58); Silverdale, Washington, US
- Years active: 1959–1993
- Spouse: E. Nick Alexander (m. 1970)

Margaret Mason (December 31, 1940 – March 26, 1999) was an American actress known for her work on soap operas in the 1970s and 1980s.

== Early life and career ==
Born and raised in Phoenixville, Pennsylvania, Mason was of Polish-Czechoslovak descent. As a child, she went to a convent boarding school. In 1958, she graduated from Saint Cyral's Girls Academy in Danville, Pennsylvania.

In 1962, Mason moved from Iowa to Hollywood. In an interview, she mentioned it was tough to get acting jobs, having to take other part-time jobs and acting lessons while looking for roles. In 1963, sponsored by Rock Hudson, she was a 'Deb Star' of Universal Studios. She appeared in The Manchurian Candidate (1962) and guest starred in several television shows. Meanwhile, her husband E. Nick Alexander wrote a script No More Trees, which starred Mason. The film was never made.

Following an extended break due to health issues, Mason returned to acting in 1970. Although advised to keep her health conditions a secret, she was open about them, and became more successful than in the 1960s. She first landed the role of Linda Patterson in Days of Our Lives, which she played for a year and a half until December 1971. Concerning her role, she told the press in a 1978 interview: "It's always been a love-hate relationship between Linda and the viewers. I'm the misunderstood bad lady." She played Linda as "a well-meaning troublemaker who wants to help others, only to see her efforts boomerang."

From late 1972 until its cancellation in 1974, Mason portrayed main character Selena Cross in the daytime soap opera Return to Peyton Place. In an interview, she said she "just loves working on R.T.P.P." She returned to Days of Our Lives in 1975, and remained on the soap opera until 1980, returning once more in 1982. During the late 1970s, Linda became one of the few female business executives on daytime, taking over Anderson Manufacturing while her husband Bob was recovering from a heart attack. Afterwards, she starred as the devious Eve Howard, Victor Newman's former secretary and lover on The Young and the Restless on and off from 1980 to 1984, and briefly in 1993. Eve notoriously tried to kill Nikki on her wedding day to Victor Newman (after trying to poison Victor the year before), then snuck into their trunk before they decided not to leave on their honeymoon. Her 1993 return saw a less calculating version of Eve, more concerned about the fact that her son Cole might be in love with his own sister, Victoria. In between, she appeared briefly on General Hospital as a relationship consultant who was really a secret madame.

== Personal life ==
Mason was a devout Catholic, and once considered becoming a nun. In 1968, she had double pneumonia, cancer surgery, a heart attack and heart surgery. According to the actress, surviving these setbacks changed her personality, from being a "panicky, fussing" woman who became "excited about nothing and being upset about small things" to one who was "unhurried, calm, pausing to savor life". It took her a year and a half to rehabilitate, and although she frequently felt over-tired in her later life, she insisted she fully recovered, saying, "I feel much better than I did before the operation. I can now ride and swim, and I play golf with Nick. Now, I enjoy life as it is, every day, every moment!"

In the 1960s, Mason met actor-writer E. Nick Alexander, whom she married on November 17, 1970. She was a close friend of Mary K. Wells, her Return to Peyton Place co-star. She raised his daughter Lisa Howard from an earlier marriage. In 1999, Mason died of a heart attack at age 58. She was survived by her husband Alexander, a daughter, her mother and her sister.

== Filmography ==
Film
Year	Film	Role	Notes
1959	Night of the Ghouls	Martha	
1962	The Manchurian Candidate		uncredited
1963	Beach Party		uncredited
1964	Honeymoon Hotel	Mrs. Miller	uncredited
1965	I'll Take Sweden	Aggressive blonde	uncredited
Television
Year	Title	Role	Notes
1963	Burke's Law	Model #1	1 episode
1964	Perry Mason	Receptionist	1 episode
1964	Burke's Law	Amanda's Granddaughter / Dona	2 episodes
1964	The Baileys of Balboa	Penny	1 episode
1964	Death Valley Days		1 episode
1965	No Time for Sergeants	Nancy Gordon	1 episode
1965	The Rogues	Avis	1 episode
1965	Hank	Diana	1 episode
1967	The Wild Wild West	Lola	1 episode uncredited
1967	Get Smart	Natasha	1 episode
1969	Adam-12	Margaret	1 episode
1970–1971	Days of Our Lives	Linda Patterson #2	Daytime soap opera
1972–1974	Return to Peyton Place	Selena Cross	Daytime soap opera
1975–1980	Days of Our Lives	Linda Patterson #2	Daytime soap opera
1981	Play for Today	Trevor Preston Duo member	1 episode
1980–1984	The Young and the Restless	Eve Howard	Daytime soap opera
1982	Days of Our Lives	Linda Patterson #2	Daytime soap opera
1990	General Hospital	Gloria #1	Daytime soap opera
1991	Northern Exposure	Proprietor	1 episode
1993	The Young and the Restless	Eve Howard	Daytime soap opera
