= Marion Partridge =

Marion Partridge (née Saltmarsh) is a fictional character in the novel Peyton Place and in the subsequent film adaptation. In the film, Marion was played by actress Peg Hillias.

Marion Saltmarsh was born an unknown seaside community in New Hampshire, and met her future husband, Charles Partridge, fresh from law school, when he visited her father's Baptist church. They married, and eventually moved to the community of Peyton Place, where he became the town's most prominent lawyer. After her marriage, she deserted the Baptists, whom she had been affiliated with since she was a little girl and joined the congregationalists, for she thought that they were the best church in town.

As she became part of the Peyton Place Community, she became more interested in possessing things, rather than cherishing what she had. She and Roberta Carter, although the latter didn't live on Chestnut Street, which was the most desirable street in Peyton Place, became best friends. Marion was well known for being extremely judgmental towards people who didn't meet up to her extremely high standards.

She had a lot of animosity towards people she didn't necessarily like, most notably Constance MacKenzie and her daughter, Allison. Marion always believed that she was the paragon of morals and virtue, but in reality, she was extremely cruel to those she didn't like; also she was more than a little bit selfish.

One of her most frequent enemies was Dr. Matthew Swain, Peyton Place's doctor, who incidentally was one of her husband's closest friends. She had no liking for his way of telling her the truth. When he told her something she didn't want to hear, (That she had menopause, and that she was over forty) she demanded that he would no longer be consulted on by her. Instead, she would rather go to Dr. John Bixby in the nearby town of White River, where she would be told exactly what she wanted to hear.

Later on, she would viciously gossip about Selena Cross, who had killed her incestuous stepfather, and she was angered that Charles didn't want to prosecute Selena, because she had killed him in self-defense. (He had raped her and would have done so again, had she not killed him) She was one of the few people in Peyton Place who was so angry that Selena was acquitted and she was instrumental in spreading all the talk about her. To some degree, she was Lucas Cross' only ally, because, characteristically, she selfishly thought of what he had done for her (he had built their kitchen shelves) and not that Selena would have been traumatized again.

Her role was expanded in the sequel Return to Peyton Place. She was instrumental in the vicious firing of Michael Rossi from his job as principal of the Peyton Place Schools, due to his unqualified support of Allison for writing her book, "Samuel's Castle". (The book offended her sensibilities) Although at first, she worked in concert with Roberta Carter to remove Mr. Rossi, Roberta eventually reversed her decision and rehired him to his position; angering Marion in the end; and this ended their friendship.

After that, Roberta had been killed by her vicious daughter in-law, Jennifer Burbank Carter, when she pushed her down a flight of stairs, breaking her neck. Obviously, Marion didn't attend her funeral, unless she felt that she had to, as a part of the community. Again, this kept true to her very selfish nature.

In the 1957 movie, Marion was a member of the school board, and was known for her pettiness; gossiping, and, like the book, was very selfish. She supposedly saw Allison and her friend Norman Page, swimming in the nude (It had really been Rodney Harrington and Betty Anderson; Allison and Norman were wearing swimming attire) and she had called Constance and Evelyn (Allison and Norman's mothers, respectively) to spread the news.
