= Bad Georgia Road =

1977 film by John Broderick

- Film poster
- Directed by: John C. Broderick
- Written by: John C. Broderick; Jeffrey Bernini
- Produced by: John C. Broderick
- Starring: Gary Lockwood; Carol Lynley; Royal Dano; John Wheeler; Cliff Emmich
- Cinematography: Tak Fujimoto
- Edited by: Keith Olson
- Music by: Don Peake
- Production company: Dimension Pictures
- Distributed by: Dimension Pictures
- Release date: 1977
- Running time: 86 minutes
- Country: United States
- Language: English

Bad Georgia Road is a 1977 American action comedy film produced, co-written and directed by John C. Broderick and starring Gary Lockwood, Carol Lynley and Royal Dano.

== Synopsis ==
A New York City woman inherits a moonshine farm in the Southern United States.

== Cast ==
- Gary Lockwood - Leroy Hastings
- Carol Lynley - Molly Golden
- Royal Dano - Arthur Pennyrich
- John Wheeler - Dub Douchette
- John Kerry - Larch
- Cliff Emmich - Earl DePue
- Tom Kibbe - Darryl
- Glynn Rubin - Laura Jean

== Production ==
The film was shot in the Lake Piru area in Ventura County, California. It had the working title Molly.

== Release ==
The film was initially set to be released by Golden Films International, which eventually passed on it; it was then acquired by Dimension Pictures in April 1977, which initially released a limited release only in Georgia, where it grossed a respectable $102,000 in its first week, and slowly expanded, being mainly screened in the southern United States. In 1978, it was re-released as the second feature in a double bill, paired with either The Great Smokey Roadblock or Hi-Riders.
