= Carol Lynley =

American actress (1942–2019)

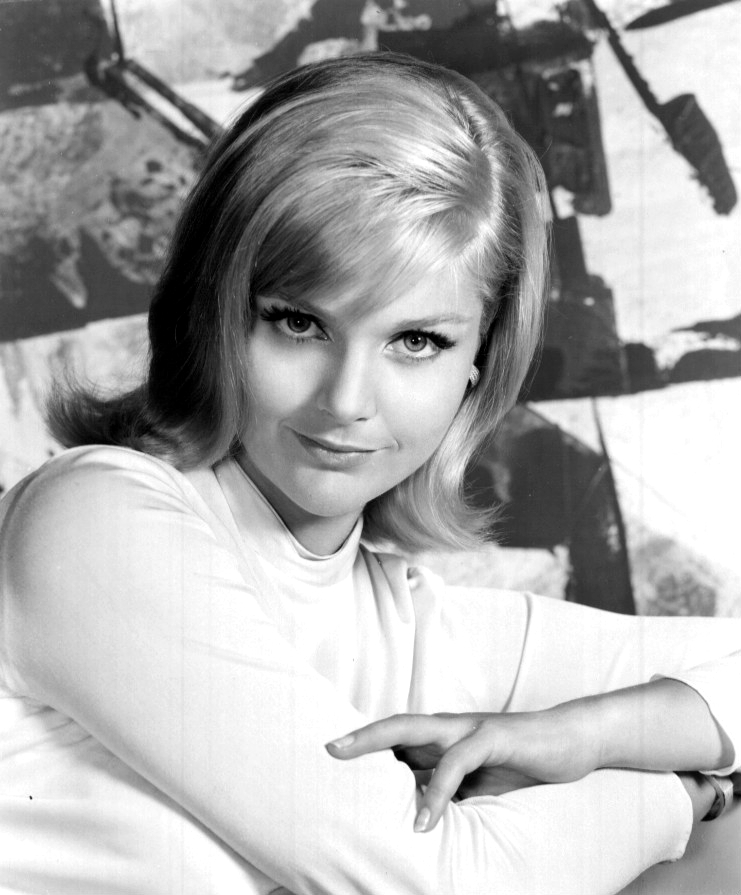
- Lynley in 1965
- Born: Carole Ann Jones; February 13, 1942; New York City, New York, US
- Died: September 3, 2019 (aged 77); Los Angeles, California, US
- Other name: Carolyn Lee
- Occupations: Actress; model
- Years active: 1955–2006
- Known for: The Potting Shed; Blue Denim; The Poseidon Adventure; The Light in the Forest; Return to Peyton Place; The Cardinal; Under the Yum Yum Tree; Bunny Lake Is Missing
- Spouse: Michael Selsman (m. 1960; div. 1964)
- Children: 1

Carol Lynley (born Carole Ann Jones; February 13, 1942 – September 3, 2019) was an American actress known for her roles in the films Blue Denim (1959) and The Poseidon Adventure (1972).

Lynley began her career as a child model before taking up acting. She won the Theatre World Award as "one of the most promising personalities for 1956–57" for her performance in The Potting Shed. Lynley started her film career in 1958 with the Disney film The Light in the Forest, followed by Holiday for Lovers (1959) and Blue Denim (1959). In 1959, she was nominated for the Golden Globe Award for Most Promising Newcomer – Female for the film The Light in the Forest. A year later, she was again nominated for the same award for the film Blue Denim.

== Early life ==
Lynley was born Carole Ann Jones in Manhattan, New York City, the daughter of Frances (née Felch) and Cyril Jones. Her father was Irish and her mother, a native of New England, was of English, Scottish, Welsh and German ancestry. She studied dance in her childhood. Her parents divorced when she was a child, and her mother worked as a waitress until Lynley's income from modeling was enough to sustain the family.

Lynley had first appeared on a local television show and at the age of 14 she was signed as a child model. She then appeared on live TV shows, the Goodyear Television Playhouse, Alfred Hitchcock Presents and Danger Route.

She began her career as a child model under the name Carolyn Lee. When she started acting, she discovered that child actress Carolyn Lee (born Carolyn Copp, 1935) had already registered the name in the Actors' Equity Association. She modified it by using the final syllable of Carolyn and fusing it with Lee to make Lynley. She appeared on the April 22, 1957, cover of Life identified as "Carol Lynley, 15, Busy Career Girl" at age 15.

In her teenage years, Lynley appeared in several Clairol and Pepsodent advertisements that were publicized across the country.

== Career ==
=== Early career ===
In 1955, Lynley made her first stage appearance in Moss Hart's Broadway stage hit Anniversary Waltz. At the age of 15, she played the role of Dame Sybil Thorndyke's granddaughter in the Broadway play The Potting Shed (1957).

Early on, Lynley distinguished herself on both the Broadway stage and in Hollywood screen versions of the controversial drama Blue Denim (1959), in which the teenaged characters played by Lynley and co-star Brandon deWilde had to deal with an unwanted pregnancy and (then-illegal) abortion. She won the Theatre World Award as "one of the most promising personalities for 1956–57" for her performance in The Potting Shed. This recognition helped her get a seven-year contract with 20th Century Fox.

=== Film career ===
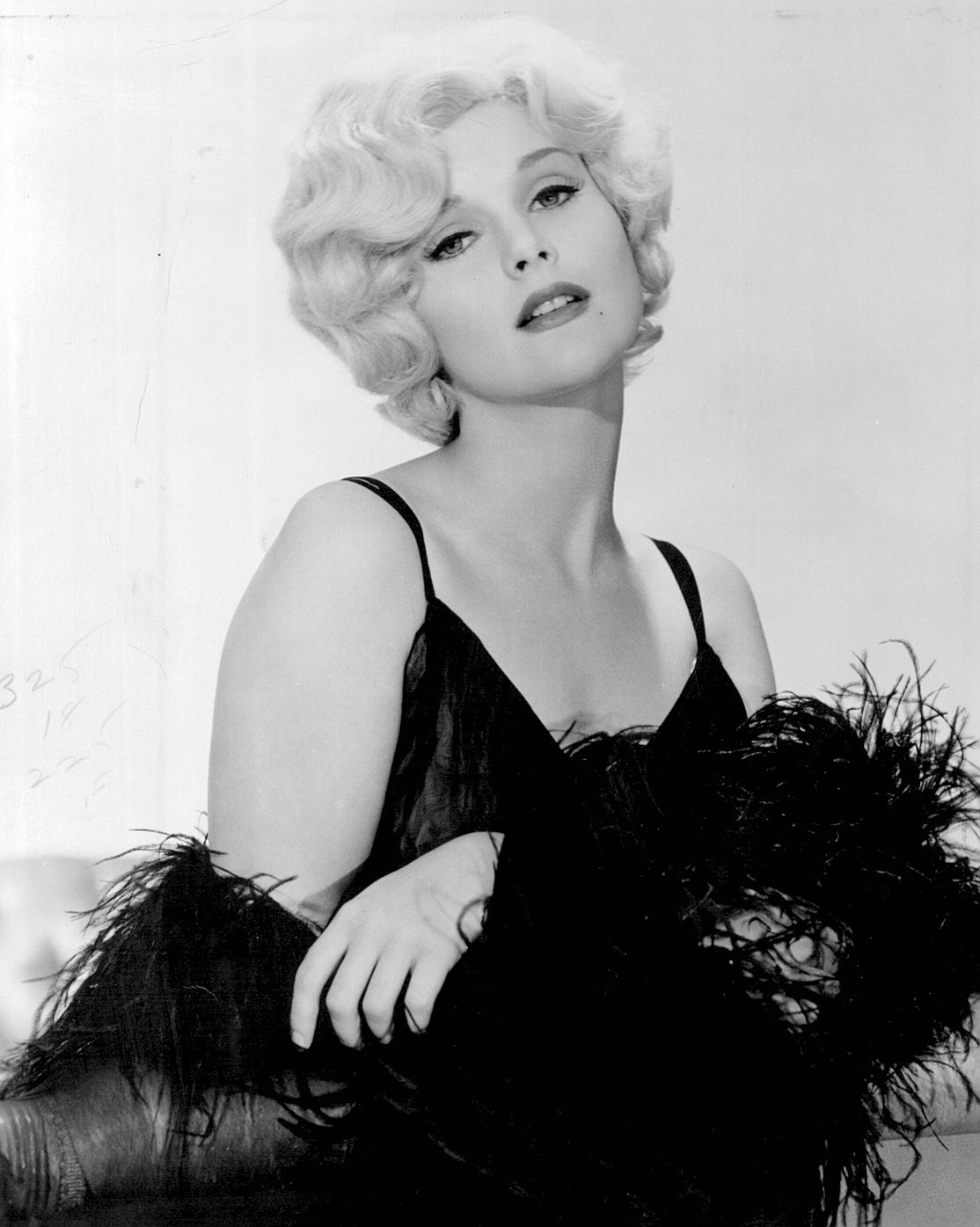
Lynley as Jean Harlow in 1965's Harlow

Lynley started her film career in 1958 with the Disney film The Light in the Forest followed by Holiday for Lovers (1959). In 1959, she was nominated for the Golden Globe Award for Most Promising Newcomer – Female. In 1960, she was again nominated for the Golden Globe Award for Most Promising Newcomer – Female for the film Blue Denim.

She acted in 20th Century Fox productions Holiday for Lovers, Blue Denim, Hound-Dog Man (all in 1959), Return to Peyton Place (1961) and The Stripper (1963). The Stripper was based on the play A Loss of Roses written by William Inge.

Lynley appeared in many films, often portraying the blonde-girl-next-door gone bad. She is best known for her film roles in Return to Peyton Place (1961), the sex comedy Under the Yum Yum Tree (1963), the drama The Cardinal (1963), the romantic drama The Pleasure Seekers (1964), the thriller Bunny Lake Is Missing (1965) and The Poseidon Adventure (1972), in which she lip-synced the Oscar-winning song "The Morning After" (her singing voice was dubbed by studio singer Renee Armand).

The Hollywood Reporter reported that Lynley was on the peak of her career in the year 1965. She posed nude at age 22 for the March 1965 edition of Playboy magazine. She starred in the Otto Preminger directed thriller Bunny Lake Is Missing (1965). Lynley played Jean Harlow in the biopic Harlow (1965), co-starring Ginger Rogers, but the film failed at the box office.

The decline in her career started in the late 1960s. In 1967, Lynley had major roles in the horror film The Shuttered Room and the British spy caper Danger Route, but the films were not successful. She did smaller roles, guest appearances and appeared in low-budget productions like Once You Kiss a Stranger (1969), The Maltese Bippy (1969), Norwood (1970) and the Larry Hagman directed horror spoof Son of the Blob (1972). In 1972, she made a brief comeback when she had supporting roles in The Night Stalker, a made-for-television film which drew top ratings, and The Poseidon Adventure, which was one of the top-grossing films of the year. However, she was unable to maintain her career momentum. She then appeared in The Four Deuces (1975), The Washington Affair (1977) and Bad Georgia Road (1977). In 1992, she acted in a low-budget thriller Spirits, as a nun. She acted in Flypaper (1997), followed by the low-budget film Drowning on Dry Land (1999). Many of the low-budget movies she acted in during the later part of her career were direct-to-video.

She appeared in the pilot television movies for Kolchak: The Night Stalker and Fantasy Island. Her many other series appearances include The Big Valley, Mannix, It Takes a Thief, Night Gallery, The Invaders, Kojak, Hawaii Five-O, Tales of the Unexpected, Hart to Hart and Charlie's Angels. Lynley appeared in the fourth season of The Man from U.N.C.L.E. in the two-part episode "The Prince of Darkness Affair".

In 2000, in an interview with the San Francisco Chronicle, Lynley discussed the difficulty faced by middle-aged actresses in finding roles. She predicted she'd have a comeback in old age, stating, "I don't mean to sound conceited, but I am a very talented actress, and I have my head screwed on right." And she added "I'm not going to drug clinics, I look good, and I've got all my marbles. So I really believe I'll be back."

In 2006, she appeared in a 30-minute film, Vic, co-written and directed by Sage Stallone, the son of Sylvester Stallone.

== Personal life and death ==
In 1960, Lynley married publicist Michael Selsman. The marriage produced one child, Jill Selsman (a director of short films), and ended in divorce in 1964. She also had an 18-year intermittent affair with English broadcaster and writer David Frost.

Lynley died aged 77 of a heart attack on September 3, 2019, at her home in Pacific Palisades, California. She was cremated; her ashes were scattered at sea off the Southern California coast.

== Selected filmography ==
=== Film ===
Year	Title	Role	Notes
1958	The Light in the Forest	Shenandoe	
1959	Holiday for Lovers	Betsy Dean	
1959	Blue Denim	Janet Willard	
1959	Hound-Dog Man	Dony Wallace	
1961	Return to Peyton Place	Allison	
1961	The Last Sunset	Melissa 'Missy' Breckenridge	
1963	The Stripper	Miriam Caswell	
1963	Under the Yum Yum Tree	Robin Austin	
1963	The Cardinal	Mona / Regina Fermoyle	
1964	The Pleasure Seekers	Maggie Williams	
1965	Harlow	Jean Harlow	
1965	Bunny Lake Is Missing	Ann Lake	
1967	Danger Route	Jocelyn	
1967	The Shuttered Room	Susannah Kelton	
1969	The Maltese Bippy	Robin Sherwood	
1969	Once You Kiss a Stranger	Diana	
1969	The Immortal	Sylvia Cartwright	TV movie (pilot for TV series)
1970	Norwood	Yvonne Phillips	
1972	Beware! The Blob	Leslie	
1972	The Night Stalker	Gail Foster	TV movie
1972	The Poseidon Adventure	Nonnie Parry	
1975	The Four Deuces	Wendy Rittenhouse	
1976	Flood!	Abbie Adams	TV movie
1977	The Washington Affair	Barbara Nicholson	TV movie
1977	Bad Georgia Road	Molly Golden	
1978	The Cat and The Canary	Annabel West	
1982	Vigilante	Assistant D.A. Mary Fletcher	
1983	Balboa	Erin Blakely	
1988	Blackout	Esther Boyle	
1989	Dark Tower	Tilly Ambrose	
1990	Spirits	Sister Jillian	
1991	Howling VI: The Freaks	Miss Eddington	
1999	Flypaper		
1999	Drowning on Dry Land	Marge	
2003	A Light in the Forest	Gramma Irene	(No connection with the 1958 movie)
2006	Vic	Carrie Lee	Short film

=== Television ===
Year	Title	Roles	Episode
1956	Goodyear Television Playhouse		"Grow Up"
1957	Alfred Hitchcock Presents	Janice	Season 3 Episode 9: "The Young One"
1962	The Virginian	Judith Morrow	"Man from the Sea"
1962	The Alfred Hitchcock Hour	Sister Pamela Wiley	Season 1 Episode 6: "Final Vow"
1967	The Man from U.N.C.L.E.	Annie Justin	"The Prince of Darkness" (parts 1 and 2)
1967	The Invaders	Elyse Reynolds	"The Believers"
1968	The Big Valley	Dilly Shanks	"Hell Hath No Fury"
1968	Journey to the Unknown	Eve	"Eve"
1969	It Takes a Thief	Michelle	"Boom at the Top"
1970–1971	The Immortal	Sylvia Cartwright	TV series
1971	Mannix	Dorothy Kinman	"Voice in the Dark"
1972	Night Gallery	Jenny Tarraday	"The Waiting Room/Last Rites for a Dead Druid"
1974	The Evil Touch	Guest role	"Dear Cora, I'm Going to Kill You"
1975	Thriller	Suzy Martin	"It it's a man - Hang Up!"
1976	Quincy M.E.	Lynn Dressler	"Who's Who in Neverland"
1976	Police Woman	Nina Daniels	"Trial by Prejudice"
1977	Kojak	Polly Ames	"Kiss It All Goodbye"
1977–1984	Fantasy Island	various characters	TV series, 11 episodes
1978	Hawaii Five-O	Karen Baker/Valerie Bates	"Angel in Blue"
1979	The Love Boat	Carol Gilmore	S2 E18 "Best of Friends/Aftermath/Dream Boat"
1980	Charlie's Angels	Lisa Gallo	"Island Angels"
1980	The Littlest Hobo	June Wilson	"Mystery At The Zoo"
1983	The Fall Guy	Ivy	"Pleasure Isle"
1984	Hammer House of Mystery and Suspense	Sylvia Daly	"In Possession"

== Awards and nominations ==
Year	Organization	Category	Work	Result	Ref.
1957	Theatre World Award	—N/a	The Potting Shed	Won	
1959	Golden Globe Awards	New Star of the Year – Actress	The Light in the Forest	Nominated	
1960	Golden Globe Awards	New Star of the Year – Actress	Blue Denim	Nominated	
