= Marguerite Hickey =

American actress

Marguerite Hickey (Rochester, New York, United States) is an American actress. She played Karin in the TV movie "Mirrors" in 1985, and was the second Flame Beaufort on NBC's soap opera Santa Barbara in 1991.

Prior to joining Santa Barbara, Marguerite also had a short role as Sherri Masterson on the NBC soap Another World. She played Megan in Peyton Place: The Next Generation.
