= Katherine Glass =

American actress

- Glass in a promotional photo for Return to Peyton Place in 1972
- Born: January 11, 1947 (age 79); New Haven, Connecticut, U.S.
- Education: Yale School of Drama
- Occupation: Actress
- Years active: 1970–present
- Known for: Return to Peyton Place; The Doctors; One Life to Live; The Best of Everything
- Spouse: Ted Harris

Katherine Glass (born January 11, 1947) is an American actress best remembered for her television work in the 1970s.

== Early life ==
"It's grueling work. If you're in four scripts a week, you rehearse each one two hours the night before, then from 11 a.m. to 5:45 p.m. the next day and tape at 6. It's the closest thing to live performances there is on television, because you simply don't re-tape unless someone's tongue gets so twisted a dirty word comes out."

— Glass on the soap opera industry.

Glass was raised as a Roman Catholic in New Haven, Connecticut. Before appearing on television, Glass played in several stock company productions, including Red, White and Maddox and as Trina in Forty Carats. Glass graduated from North Haven High School in North Haven, Connecticut. Furthermore, after graduating high school, she studied at the Yale School of Drama between 1964 and 1965.

== Career ==
In 1970, she debuted on television, playing the role of black-haired Kim Jordan on the short-lived day-time soap opera The Best of Everything. On the role, Glass commented: "Everything happened to me on that series. I played a very intense young woman and I lost my boyfriend to another woman. I even got stabbed ... it happened on a Friday and I was left for dead. I went home that weekend feeling very strange." The actress told the press in another interview she would get into her role too much, saying: "I was so much into the part, that I would be standing on the sidelines watching the actor playing my boyfriend kiss the other woman and I would actually get jealous. The actor was a nice guy but I never thought of him romantically off the set. But when I play a character for a while, I begin to think and feel like that character."

She appeared as Allison MacKenzie in Return to Peyton Place between 1972 and 1973. In an interview, she recalled being surprised to get the role, saying: "I don't know how they saw me as Allison in the first place because when they did auditions, my hair was brown." Despite rumours she got the role because of her looks, she told the press she was cast due to her experience in a soap opera. She insisted she did not analyze the acting of Mia Farrow, who originated the role of Allison, explaining she wanted to portray Allison in her own way. She played the role until 1973, and then asked to be released from her contract because she did not want to live in California any longer. Pamela Susan Shoop replaced her.

She was best remembered for appearing as missionary nun Jenny Wolek in the soap opera One Life to Live from 1975 to October 1978. During this period, she became a popular actress and set the record for receiving the most teenage mail of any character on the soap opera. She left the series in 1978 due to contract issues and "irreconciable difference" with producers. Furthermore, she claimed she left because she unsuccessfully requested time off to shoot a commercial. Glass next appeared in the soap opera The Doctors until 1981. In an interview, she expressed her content with her stint on The Doctors over One Life to Live, saying the half-hour format instead of the one-hour format allowed her to spend more time with her family.

Glass left The Doctors in November 1981. Her role on the show as the naive cousin of Carolee Aldrich (Jada Rowland) and nurse Mary Jane "MJ" Match Carroll was replaced by Amy Ingersoll. The character was written out in March 1982 after the character decided not to marry Dr. Matt Powers (James Pritchett) only nine months before the show ended.

== Personal life ==
Shortly before her work on Return to Peyton Place, Glass, who was living in New York, was attacked by a man with a knife. Nevertheless, in a later interview, she recalled missing the city, saying: "I accept the danger as part of life in a big city ... like dodging taxi cabs and crowded restaurants. But there's nothing like the excitement of New York."

In 1976, Glass secretly married stage manager Ted Harris at her New York home. They adopted a girl somewhere between late 1977 and early 1978.

== Filmography ==
Television
Year	Title	Role	Notes
1970	The Best of Everything	Kim Jordan	Daytime soap opera Unknown episodes
1972–1973	Return to Peyton Place	Allison MacKenzie #1	Daytime soap opera Unknown episodes
1973	Griff	Sharon	1 episode
1974	Owen Marshall: Counselor at Law	Pattie	1 episode
1976	The American Woman: Portraits of Courage	Sybil Lexington	TV movie
1975–1978	One Life to Live	Jenny Wolek #1	Daytime soap opera Unknown episodes
1978–1981	The Doctors	Mary Jane 'M. J.' Match #3	Daytime soap opera Unknown episodes
