= Return to Peyton Place =

Book by Grace Metalious

- First edition
- Author: Grace Metalious
- Language: English
- Publisher: Julian Messner, Inc.
- Publication date: 1959
- Publication place: United States
- Pages: 256
- LC Class: PS3525.E77 1959
- Preceded by: Peyton Place
- Followed by: The Tight White Collar

Return to Peyton Place is a 1959 novel by Grace Metalious, a sequel to her best-selling 1956 novel Peyton Place.

== Plot summary ==
After the phenomenal success of her first novel, Metalious hastily penned a sequel centering on the life and loves of bestselling author Allison MacKenzie, who follows in the footsteps of her mother by having an affair with a married man, her publisher Lewis Jackman. The similarity of their situations bond Allison and her mother.

When she returns to her hometown following the publication of her first novel, Samuel's Castle, she is forced to face the wrath of most of its residents, who are incensed by their barely disguised counterparts and the revelation of town secrets in the book. Despite that, certain members of the community stood by the MacKenzies, most notably, Seth Buswell, the newspaper editor; and his oldest friend, Dr. Matthew Swain. In fact, whenever anyone came into Dr. Swain's office and complained about Allison's book, he would roar them down and after a harsh tongue-lashing from him about some of the things that person had done, he or she would never complain about Allison's novel after that.

However, Roberta Carter, a member of the school board (working in concert with the town attorney's wife Marion Partridge), makes it her mission to ban the book from the high school library.

She punishes Allison by firing her stepfather, Michael Rossi (a decision which she eventually reverses, to the anger of Marion); while at the same time trying to dissolve her son Ted's marriage to his snobbish bride, a Boston blue-blood named Jennifer Burbank.

Another union in trouble is that of Allison's mother Constance, who is shocked by her daughter's exposé, but nonetheless stands by her, and stepfather Michael Rossi, the school principal and one of the novel's defenders.

Betty Anderson returns from New York, after giving birth to Roddy, the child she had by Rodney Harrington and, along with her cohort and Roddy's babysitter, Agnes Carlisle, moves to Peyton Place, so she can allow Leslie, Roddy's grandfather to know him.

Selena Cross, who had been acquitted of murder in the previous novel, was trying to make a life for herself and her brother, Joey. She is manager of the Thrifty Corner Apparel Shoppe, and is a success. In this book, Selena and Allison had rebonded as friends, and Allison's New York roommate, Stephanie Wallace, was also part of their circle.

== Reception ==
Return to Peyton Place received harsh reviews; Edmund Fuller in the New York Times wrote, "This sequel to 'Peyton Place' has no interest as a novel... [I]t is foolish writing, cynical publishing and bad reading." Time magazine said, "[T]he sequel bears all the marks of a book whacked together on a long weekend... Return has little more scene-setting than a limerick, and the characterization is negligible."

Metalious herself held the work in poor esteem, believing herself pressured by Hollywood producer Jerry Wald to write the sequel. In a press conference she held in New York in December 1959, she said "This isn't a novel; it's a Hollywood treatment... It was never intended to be anything else. It was a foul, rotten trick. They made a hell of a lot on Peyton Place, and they wanted to ride the gravy train."

Sales of the sequel did not approach those of the original book: While Peyton Place remained on the New York Times best seller list for 76 weeks, Return to Peyton Place spent just three (non-consecutive) weeks on the list, peaking at #13. According to Metalious biographer Emily Toth, the paperback edition sold four million copies, which was half of what the first novel sold.

== Adaptations ==
A 1961 film adaptation was directed by José Ferrer.

A daytime drama entitled Return to Peyton Place aired on NBC from April 3, 1972, to January 4, 1974, but the soap opera was a continuation of the primetime television series Peyton Place rather than an adaptation of the book.
