= Matthew Swain =

Fictional Character in Peyton Place

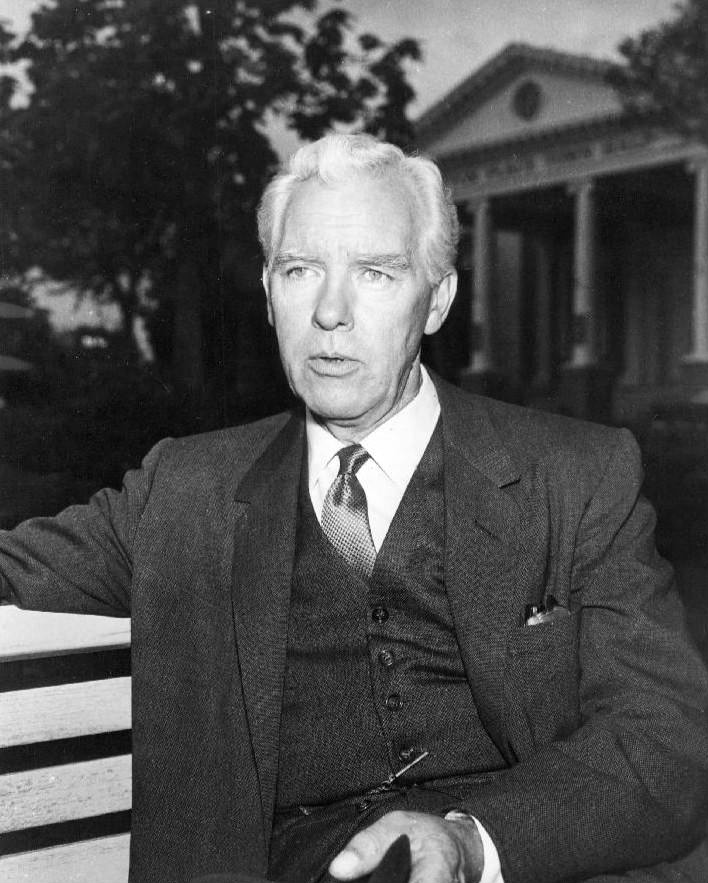
Warner Anderson as Matthew Swain.

Matthew Swain, M.D. is a fictional character in the novel Peyton Place, as well as the movie and TV series of the same name. In the movie, he was played by actor Lloyd Nolan and in the television series, he was played by actor Warner Anderson.

== History ==
Matthew Swain was the long time physician in the New Hampshire community of Peyton Place. He had grown up in the community, having done his internship at Mary Hitchcock Hospital in Hanover, New Hampshire. Dr. Swain was a widower, his wife Emily having died some years before the book began, and had been Peyton Place's doctor for some 30 years. The word "Specialist" was anathema to him, having once wrathfully told a specialist in ears eyes nose and throats, that "he specialized in sick people!" He also loved to send birthday cards to every child he delivered. In the novel, he was a friend and ally to the community's school teacher, Miss Elsie Thornton.

After his internship at Hanover, he was to go into partnership with one Dr. Jerrald Quimby, who had been the community's leading physician; until Harmon Carter, in concert with his girlfriend, and Dr. Quimby's then wife, Roberta, turned him away from his house. Furious, he hung his shingle at his parents' house on Chestnut Street and had not regretted doing so. The town had laughed at Dr. Quimby, who had married the much younger Roberta Welch, and sick people started seeing Dr. Swain, after the town found him senile and considered him a "Damned Old Fool". Later on, Dr. Quimby killed himself.

Dr. Swain was close friends with his neighbors on Chestnut Street; however his best friend was Seth Buswell, the editor of the town's newspaper, the Peyton Place Times. He was best known for helping Selena Cross during her unwanted pregnancy, the product of a rape committed by her sexually abusive stepfather, Lucas Cross. He performed an abortion (which at that time was illegal) and confronted Lucas about what he did. He eventually drove Lucas out of Peyton Place.

Later on, after Selena killed Lucas in self-defense, Dr. Swain testified about what Lucas had done and why Selena had killed him, imperiling his medical license. With his help, she was acquitted.

His only real enemies in town were Marion Partridge, who didn't like his bluntness, and Evelyn Page, the mother of Norman Page, after he told her that "there was nothing wrong with her but selfishness and bad temper." These two women proceeded to go to the nearby town of White River and consulted that community's doctor, Dr. John Bixby, who was more than willing to tell them what they wanted to hear.

In the movie, he also helped Selena by testifying about what had happened (Lucas's molestation, and why Selena had a miscarriage). Dr. Swain also delivered a solemn rebuke to the townspeople about being prisoners of each other's gossip, mildly rebuking the community of not being there for Selena when she needed someone. The only person she could turn to was him and that was because she needed medical treatment. He reminded Peyton Place about how everyone went to church, but didn't practice what the churches preached; their school, which most take for granted; a wonderful newspaper which most use to wrap garbage; and how young people, like Allison and Norman, would leave and donate their minds to another community because they felt stifled in their hometown.

In the television series, Matthew Swain was the editor of the town's newspaper (this time, called the Peyton Place Clarion) after the doctor became Michael Rossi, the former high school principal. He was also the uncle of Allison MacKenzie. In the television series, the character of Matthew Swain left Peyton Place midway through the first season.
