= Susan Brown (American actress) =

American actress (1932–2018)

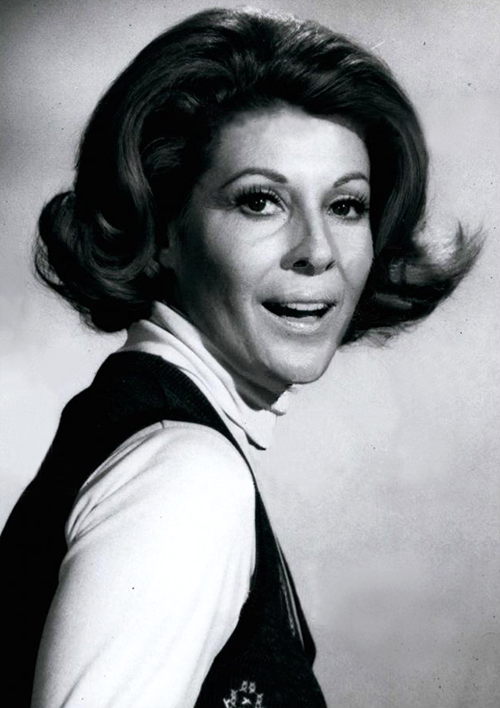
- Brown in 1975
- Born: May 4, 1932; San Francisco, California, U.S.
- Died: August 31, 2018 (aged 86); Los Angeles, California, U.S.
- Education: University of Southern California
- Occupations: Actress, interior designer
- Years active: 1955–2004

Susan Brown (May 4, 1932 – August 31, 2018) was an American television and film actress and interior designer. She was best known for her roles on daytime soap operas, particularly General Hospital; in 1979, she was nominated for a Daytime Emmy Award for her role on the show.

== Early life ==
Brown was born in San Francisco, California. She graduated from the University of Southern California, majoring in drama and later attended the American Theatre Wing in New York City.

== Career ==
Brown's first soap role was on From These Roots in 1959, taking over temporarily from leading actress Ann Flood. Afterwards, she also subbed for Flood on numerous occasions in the role of Nancy Karr on The Edge of Night. She later had regular roles on the short-lived soaps The Young Marrieds, Bright Promise and Return to Peyton Place, playing Constance MacKenzie.

In 1977, Brown joined the cast of General Hospital as Dr. Gail Adamson Baldwin, Monica Webber's foster mother who married widowed attorney Lee Baldwin (Peter Hansen). In 1979, Brown was nominated for a Daytime Emmy Award for Outstanding Supporting Actress. She left the series on December 12, 1985, and made occasional appearances from 1989 to 1990 before returning on September 30, 1992, on a recurring status.

In between stints, Brown played Victoria Lane's mother, Janet, on Santa Barbara and businesswoman Adelaide Fitzgibbons (who was romantically involved with the much younger Kirk Anderson (Tom Wiggin) on As the World Turns).

Brown, however, continued to be seen on occasion for special events on both shows. Along with Peter Hansen, she made her final appearance in 2004 in an episode honoring the late Anna Lee, who played Lila Quartermaine, whose character was also killed off.

Along with her soap career, Brown performed on Broadway, primetime television, and films. She guest starred on Death Valley Days, Kojak, Marcus Welby, M.D., Doc Elliot, Barney Miller, Hotel, Beverly Hills, 90210, and Frasier. She was a regular cast member on the short-lived ABC legal drama, Mariah in 1987.

Brown also appeared in a number of films; in 1971, she appeared in a science fiction feature film, The Andromeda Strain as Mrs Allison Stone. In addition, Brown appeared in made-for-TV movies, including playing Nancy Reagan in Without Warning: the James Brady Story and Pat Nixon in The Final Days.

== Personal life and death ==
Brown owned an interior design firm and assisted various soap stars and television friends with her decorating services. She died on August 31, 2018, in Los Angeles from undisclosed causes at the age of 86. She had been suffering from Alzheimer's disease. She never married nor had any children.

She was a staunch Republican who actively supported conservative politics and political campaigns. Throughout her life, she dedicated time to volunteering and campaigning for the presidential administrations of Richard Nixon, Gerald Ford, Ronald Reagan, George H.W. Bush, and George W. Bush. Her dedication to the party also included active membership in local political organizations, most notably the Bel-Air Republican Women's Group. She was also a Presbyterian who was an active parishoner of the Bel Air Presbyterian Church.

== Soap appearances ==
- From These Roots as Liz Fraser Allen (1958-1961)
- The Edge of Night as Nancy Pollock Karr (temporary replacement, 1962, 1964)
- The Young Marrieds as Ann Reynolds (1964–66)
- Bright Promise as Martha Ferguson (1969–72)
- Return to Peyton Place as Constance MacKenzie Carson (1972–1974)
- The Young and the Restless as Fran Whitaker (1975)
- General Hospital as Dr. Gail Adamson Baldwin (1977–85, 1989–90, 1992–2002, 2004)
- Santa Barbara as Janet Lane (1986)
- As the World Turns as Adelaide Fitzgibbon (1988)
- Port Charles as Dr. Gail Adamson Baldwin (1997–2001)

== Selected filmography ==
- Alfred Hitchcock Presents (1961) (Season 6 Episode 36: "Final Arrangements") as Secretary
- Alfred Hitchcock Presents (1961) (Season 7 Episode 4: "Cop for a Day") as Receptionist
