= Evelyn Scott (actress) =

American actress

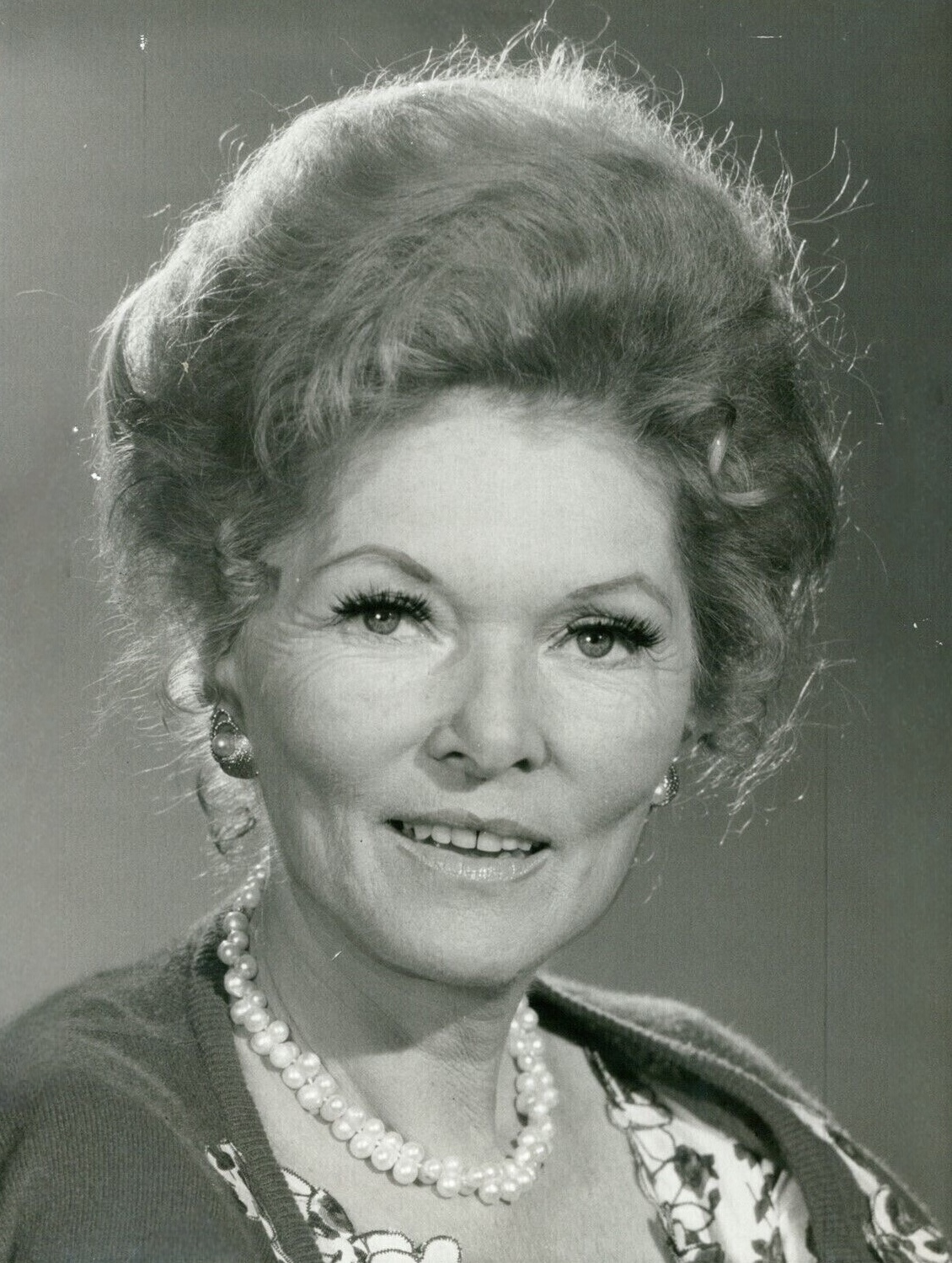
- Scott in Return to Peyton Place, 1972
- Born: April 20, 1915; Brockton, Massachusetts, U.S.
- Died: January 31, 2002 (aged 86); Los Angeles, California, U.S.
- Occupation: Actress
- Years active: 1952–1985
- Spouse: Urban S. Hirsch Jr. (m. 1961)

Evelyn Scott (April 20, 1915 – January 31, 2002) was an American film and television actress.

== Biography ==
Born in Brockton, Massachusetts, Scott began her career as a disc jockey for KMPC, the first female DJ at that Los Angeles radio station.

Her work as an actress began on radio on the 1940s, guest starring on such series as Let George Do It. Scott transitioned to television in 1952, guest starring in several shows, including Schlitz Playhouse, Gunsmoke, The Danny Thomas Show, Dragnet, Perry Mason, The Untouchables, and Bonanza. In the 1950s, Scott also played several supporting roles in movies.

From 1960 to 1962, Scott had a recurring role as Adelaide Mitchell in the John Forsythe television comedy Bachelor Father.

In 1965, Scott landed the recurring role of Ada Jacks in the television series Peyton Place. She played that role until the series' cancellation in 1969. She reprised the role in the daytime soap opera Return to Peyton Place, from 1972–1974. Her final appearance would be in 1985, yet again as Ada Jacks, in the television movie Peyton Place: The Next Generation.

Scott was also active as a board member of Portals House Inc., a center helping people with mental dysfunctions. She married Urban S. Hirsch Jr. in 1961 and stayed married to him until her death in 2002.

== Filmography ==
| Year | Film | Role | Notes |
|---|---|---|---|
| 1953 | Wicked Woman | Dora Bannister | |
| 1957 | Back From the Dead | Molly Prentiss | |
| 1957 | The Green-Eyed Blonde | Helen | Uncredited |
| 1958 | I Want to Live! | Personal effects clerk | Uncredited |
| 1985 | Peyton Place: The Next Generation | Ada Jacks | Television movie |
