= Constance MacKenzie =

Fictional character

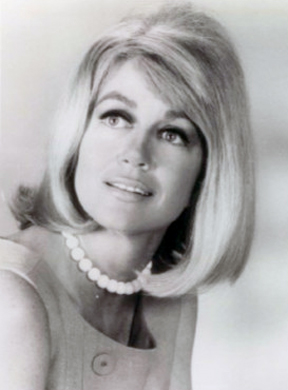
Dorothy Malone as Constance MacKenzie.

Constance MacKenzie (née Standish) is a fictional character in the 1956 novel Peyton Place by Grace Metalious.

Lana Turner portrayed Constance in the 1957 film adaptation, and Eleanor Parker played the character in the 1961 sequel film, Return to Peyton Place. The character was portrayed by Dorothy Malone (and briefly by Lola Albright) in the 1960s TV series, and in the short-lived 1970s daytime soap opera Return to Peyton Place, she was played by Bettye Ackerman and later Susan Brown.

== Character background ==
Constance Standish was born and bred in the small New Hampshire community of Peyton Place; living with her widowed mother, Elizabeth Standish. Like most people in that community, she was repressed. She met, acquired a job with, and eventually fell in love with a man named Allison MacKenzie, who ran an exotic fabric shop in New York City.

They had an extramarital affair (he was married and had two children and a wife in Scarsdale, New York), and from that affair, her daughter, Allison MacKenzie, his namesake, was born. (Allison, according to the book, was a year older than she really was, because Constance and her mother doctored the birth certificate.) After the birth of Allison, Mr. MacKenzie died, and left her some money in a discreet bank account. With this money and what she had saved while her former lover was alive, she opened a clothing store in her hometown.

In the novel, it was named, the Thrifty Corner Apparel Shoppe; in the movie, it was simply called, The Tweed Shop; and in the television series, she didn't own a clothing store, but operated the town's book store.

Constance and Allison had a strained relationship, especially with dealing with her daughter's moods and feelings and choices of her work. Constance didn't approve of Allison's friendship with the much poorer Selena Cross, but eventually, she saw something good in her, and offered her a job at the Thrifty Corner; later on, she became manager. She met the new school principal, Michael Rossi (named Tomas Makris in the novel's initial printing), and they fell in love, and eventually married.

Before they married, Constance, in a fit of rage, called Allison a bastard. This shocked Allison, as she found out about her birth, and that her mother had never been married. This stemmed from her and neighbor Evelyn Page, falsely accusing both Allison and Norman Page (Evelyn's son) of having sex. (They had been on an innocent picnic, but both mothers believed the worst.) Adding to the tension was the suicide of Selena's mother, Nellie. These events only added to the estrangement between Allison and Constance, and led up to Allison leaving Peyton Place for good to move to New York.

In the movie, Constance and Michael were a couple, but were not married. It wasn't until the sequel, Return to Peyton Place, that Constance and Michael married. In the sequel, Allison's book was published, and was met with scathing reviews by the more hypocritical people in Peyton Place, namely Marion Partridge and Roberta Carter.

Also, the fact that Allison, ironically, also had an affair with a married man, much like Constance herself did, helped the two bond once more. In fact, Constance assured Allison that life went on, and although her daughter didn't have a child to live for, as Constance had, she reminded her that living for Lewis meant her returning to her work writing, which Allison did.
