= Ben Andrews (actor) =

American actor

- Born: May 16, 1942; Cleveland, Ohio U.S.
- Died: May 13, 1981 (aged 38); Los Angeles, California, U.S.
- Occupation: Actor

Ben Andrews (May 16, 1942 – May 13, 1981) was an American actor.

== Career ==
Making his first television appearance in the late 1960s, Andrews was best known for portraying the prominent character Benny and Jason Tate in the daytime soap opera Return to Peyton Place between 1972 and 1973. Afterwards, he played Detective Perry on the soap opera Days of Our Lives, and he was attached to General Hospital.

Besides appearing in soap operas, Andrews also guest starred in several TV series, including Planet of the Apes, The Streets of San Francisco, Mannix, The Six Million Dollar Man, The Rockford Files and The Waltons.

== Death ==
Andrews died on May 13, 1981, at the age of 38.
