= Selena Cross =

Fictional character

Selena Cross is a fictional character in the novel Peyton Place, as well as its sequel, Return to Peyton Place and the films based on the novels.

== In the novel ==
Selena was born on the wrong side of the tracks; the more respectable people in Peyton Place consider her a "shack dweller". Her biological father, Curtis Chamberlain, was killed in a lumber mill accident; and her mother, Nellie Cross, a housekeeper, had married a man named Lucas Cross. Lucas and Nellie had a younger son, Joey, of whom, Selena was very protective.

She was best friends with Allison MacKenzie, which often distressed her extremely proper mother, Constance MacKenzie. However, Constance eventually saw something good in Selena, and she hired her to assist her at the Thrifty Corner Apparel Shoppe, the store that she owned. However, Selena hid a tragic secret: Lucas physically and sexually abused her.

When she went in for a check-up with Dr. Matthew Swain, Peyton Place's local physician, she was told that she was pregnant. Dr. Swain pressed her for the father's name, and she revealed through tears that it was Lucas. Later, he performed an illegal (at that time) abortion to end Selena's suffering.

Then Dr. Swain angrily confronted Lucas about the situation. Lucas vehemently denied it at first, thinking he had done nothing wrong, to his mind. (He paid his bills and minded his own business, to him, that expiated all other sins, including beating his wife and abusing his children). He eventually confessed that he did molest Selena since she was aged fourteen. Dr. Swain, so sickened by the recitation of Lucas, forced Lucas to sign a confession and then ordered him to leave Peyton Place and never come back, which he did.

Upon discovery of Lucas' crime, Nellie suicided by hanging herself in Allison's bedroom closet. This set off a religious skirmish in Peyton Place, when the Catholic priest, Father O'Brien, refused to bury Nellie in the Catholic Cemetery's consecrated ground; then the supposedly "Congregational" minister, Reverend Francis Joseph Fitzgerald refused to bury Nellie. This led to his resignation from the church, and his wife, Margaret, leaving him to return to her family in the nearby town of White River. Eventually, her mother was buried by a man named Oliver Rank who headed a Pentecostal church in town.

Years passed, and Selena had long become manager of the Thrifty Corner, (Constance had a lot of faith and trust in her, because she ran the store just as well as she herself had done) and she and Joey had scraped together a decent life for themselves, (Joey's loyalty to his half-sister was unmatched and equal to a son's loyalty to his mother and the two were close) until Lucas, (who had mysteriously enlisted in the Navy) showed up at Christmas. When he tried to molest and rape Selena again, as he had done in years past, she hit him with a pair of fireplace tongs and killed him instantly. She and Joey buried him in the adjoining sheep pen. Later on Selena breaks down and tells Connie that she killed Lucas, who reports her to the police.

Eventually Selena was placed on trial. Allison and Norman return for the trial to comfort her. The truth about Selena killing Lucas in self-defense, his physical and sexual abuse, and Dr. Swain's false medical report all come to light to acquit her. Only one person in town had no liking of Selena, and that person was Marion Partridge, the wife of Charles Partridge, who viciously spread the gossip about her, and helped the community humiliate Selena.

At that time, Selena was in love with Ted Carter, the son of Harmon and Roberta Carter, whose scandals were much worse than Selena's was. (In the movie, Ted and Selena remained a couple)

Among her crimes, Roberta Carter (born Roberta "Bobbie" Welch), in concert with her soon-to-be husband, Harmon, made life miserable for one Dr. Jerrald Quimby, who had been the only doctor in Peyton Place until Matt Swain came home to practice. To the shock and the utter bemusement of Peyton Place, Roberta began to work for and then married Dr. Quimby, and she, in cahoots with Harmon, cruelly turned Dr. Swain away from the house he would have practiced in; the furious Dr. Swain eventually moved into his parents "Southern Looking" house on ritzy Chestnut Street, and did not have cause to regret it.

Dr. Quimby eventually rewrote his will to favor his new wife, Roberta; and then later on, the town made life miserable for him (calling him a "Damned Old Fool" among other epithets), and laughed at him, after everyone thought him senile enough that they went to see Dr. Swain for medical services instead of him; The town eventually laughed him to death. He put a gun to his mouth and killed himself, two weeks shy of his first marriage anniversary. The town viciously condemned both Harmon and Roberta for this terrible behavior.

However, Ted, who turned out to be no better than his morally bankrupt parents, felt that being married to a murderess would not work in his plan. So, in the sequel, Return to Peyton Place, Selena lived her life as a single woman; continued to work at the Thrifty Corner (she was the store's manager), and did her best to singlehandedly take care of Joey. (Ted had married a snobby blueblood named Jennifer Burbank who eventually killed her mother in-law)

She later became involved with itinerant actor, Tim Randlett, but her memories of Lucas almost wrecked the relationship. It later turned out that Stephanie Wallace, a friend of Allison and Selena's from New York, had known and worked with him, and, in her words, he was a royal pain. Selena and Allison's friendship had taken some turns and stops, during the two novels courses, but in the end, they remained friends. She finally found happiness with her lawyer Peter Drake, whom she eventually married.

== In other media ==
In the film adaptation of the novel, she was played by actress Hope Lange; in the sequel, she was played by Tuesday Weld. In the short-lived 1974 daytime serial Return to Peyton Place (she was not in the 1960s television series, Peyton Place), she was played by actress Margaret Mason.

In the 1972 television serial, based on the 1960s series, Selena married Dr. Michael Rossi. (Due to the controversy of the original incest story in the novel, the whole Cross family, who were major players in the novels and the movies, were not shown on TV, and it would not be until 1972 that Selena would finally appear on television.)
