= Michael Rossi (Peyton Place) =

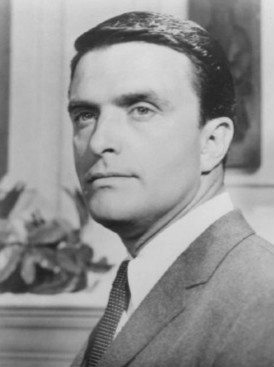
Ed Nelson as Michael Rossi

Michael Rossi is a fictional character in the novel Peyton Place by Grace Metalious. Michael Rossi is a teacher and high school principal who had replaced Abner Firth, the preceding teacher and principal who had died of a heart attack. He becomes the love interest of Constance MacKenzie, a woman with a hidden past.

The character of Rossi originally was called Tomas Makris, bearing the name and description of a Laconia resident and co-worker of Metalious's school teacher husband. However, Makris sued for libel, winning an out-of-court settlement for $60,000. Makris was renamed Michael Rossi in later printings, and in the film and TV series which derived from the novel. In editions published in the United Kingdom, he was called Michael Kyros; in Return to Peyton Place, he was named Michael Rossi.

In the 1957 movie Peyton Place, Michael Rossi is played by Lee Philips.

In the TV series Peyton Place, which ran from 1964 to 1969, the character of Dr. Rossi was played by Ed Nelson. Rossi's profession was changed from high school principal to doctor. The former doctor, Matthew Swain, becomes the editor of the Peyton Place Clarion.

In the 1972–1974 daytime series Return to Peyton Place, the role of Dr. Rossi was played by Guy Stockwell.
