= Patricia Morrow =

American actress

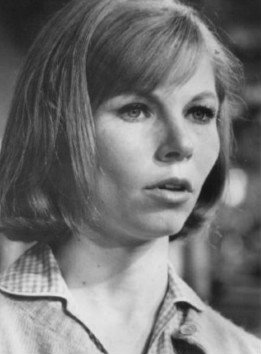
- Morrow as Rita Jacks on Peyton Place.
- Years active: 1953-1985
- Spouse: Carl Lance Brisson (1975-1982)

Patricia Morrow is a former actress, best known for her portrayal of waif-like Rita Jacks in the primetime soap opera Peyton Place from 1965 to 1969.

== Career ==
=== Acting career ===
Morrow usually appeared on television and made her debut in 1953, when she got the role of Constance Philbrick in I Led 3 Lives. She also played bit parts in several films, including Ma and Pa Kettle at Home (1954), Artists and Models (1955), The Bad Seed (1956), and The Wrong Man (1956).

Morrow later got supporting roles in films and started guest starring in several series in the 1960s, including Leave It to Beaver, My Three Sons and Perry Mason. In 1964, she got her first and only lead role in a film, a musical called Surf Party. She got more recognition when she landed the role of Rita Jacks in the soap opera Peyton Place. Despite only being contracted for a few episodes, she played the role for four years, between 1965 and 1969. During the show's run, Morrow became highly popular among the crowd.

Morrow reprised the role from 1972 to 1974 in Return to Peyton Place. She initially declined the role, saying she could not combine working five days a week on the show with law school. However, she accepted a contract of two working days a week and she motivated her return by saying: "I really can't turn down money. I have to use what earning power I have right now.

Morrow made her final screen appearance in 1985, playing Rita Jacks yet again in the made for television film Peyton Place: The Next Generation.

=== Post-acting career ===
Following the demise of Peyton Place, Morrow, inspired by visits to Vietnam, immersed in volunteer work with kids on probation in a ghetto in Los Angeles. On her motivation, she commented: "Those kids need a model. Somebody to say, 'You can do what you want, be what you want.' Most of them don't think they can do anything. It is only through agencies like the Legal Aid Society, that youngsters learn of outlets — where to go and how to get there."

During her volunteer work, Morrow became interested in political and legal leverage. She enrolled in Glendale University College of Law, from which she graduated during her run on Return to Peyton Place. On her political contribution, Morrow commented: "I want to see if the democratic process works. I want to see if it can be done. I think a lot of our difficulties are perpetuated by untrained office holders, and I resent the fact most politicians don't know a darned thing about local problems."

She also earned a BA in political science at California State University, Northridge.

== Personal life ==
During the run of Peyton Place, Morrow had a relationship with her onscreen husband Christopher Connelly. Morrow later married Carl Lance Brisson, the son of Rosalind Russell, in 1975. Shortly after their divorce in 1982, Morrow adopted a baby girl she named Marielle Margaret Morrow. Patricia's father was Robert (Bob) Morrow, a Los Angeles attorney, and she was raised in the Toluca Lake area.

== Filmography ==
Film
Year	Film	Role	Notes
1944	Marriage Is a Private Affair	Baby	uncredited
1954	Ma and Pa Kettle at Home	Susie Kettle	uncredited
1955	Artists and Models	Zuba Girl	uncredited
1956	The Kettles in the Ozarks	Sally	uncredited
1956	The Bad Seed	Ginny	uncredited
1956	The Wrong Man	Young Girl	uncredited
1957	The Kettles on Old MacDonald's Farm	Bertha	as Pat Morrow
1964	Surf Party	Terry Wells	
Television
Year	Title	Role	Notes
1953–1956	I Led Three Lives	Constance Philbrick	
1954	Mayor of the Town	Nancy	2 episodes
1956	Dr. Christian	-	1 episode
1956	Carolyn	Elizabeth	Failed pilot
1957	General Electric Theater	Nancy	"A New Girl in His Life"
1957	Annie Get Your Gun	Jessie Oakley	TV movie based on Irving Berlin's stage musical
1963	Going My Way	Jo Ann Stevens	"My Son the Social Worker"
1963	Leave It to Beaver	Girl #1	1 episode as Pat Morrow
1964	The Virginian	Ellie Marden	Episode "Smile of a Dragon"
1964	Mr. Novak	Different characters	4 episodes
1964	My Three Sons	Nancy/Lissa Stratmeyer	2 episodes
1964	Perry Mason	Marla Carol	"The Case of the Bullied Bowler"
1965	Dr. Kildare	young nurse	uncredited
1965–1969	Peyton Place	Rita Jacks	Primetime soap opera
1970	The Virginian	Ellie Yost	1 episode
1970	Gunsmoke	Stella Felton	1 episode
1972–1974	Return to Peyton Place	Rita Jacks Harrington	Daytime soap opera
1974	Run, Joe, Run	Missionary 1	Episode: "Missionary"
1976	Emergency!	Gymnastics Coach Jenny Carter	1 episode
1985	Peyton Place: The Next Generation	Rita Harrington	TV movie as Pat Morrow
