= Peyton Place (film) =

1957 film by Mark Robson

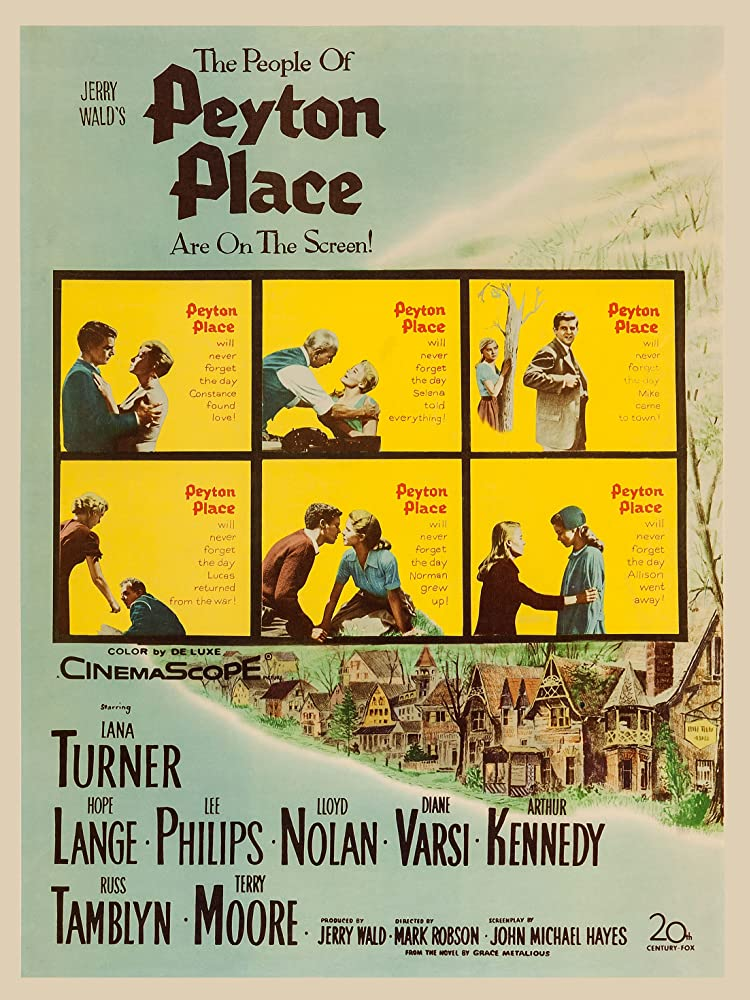
- Theatrical release poster
- Directed by: Mark Robson
- Screenplay by: John Michael Hayes
- Based on: Peyton Place by Grace Metalious
- Produced by: Jerry Wald
- Starring: Lana Turner; Hope Lange; Lee Philips; Lloyd Nolan; Diane Varsi; Arthur Kennedy; Russ Tamblyn; Terry Moore
- Cinematography: William C. Mellor
- Edited by: David Bretherton
- Music by: Franz Waxman
- Production company: Jerry Wald Productions
- Distributed by: 20th Century Fox
- Release dates: December 11, 1957 (Camden, Maine); December 12, 1957 (United States)
- Running time: 157 minutes
- Country: United States
- Language: English
- Budget: $1.8–$2.2 million or $3 million
- Box office: $25.6 million

Peyton Place is a 1957 American drama film starring Lana Turner, Hope Lange, Lee Philips, Lloyd Nolan, Diane Varsi, Arthur Kennedy, Russ Tamblyn, and Terry Moore. Directed by Mark Robson, it follows the residents of a small fictional New England mill town in the years surrounding World War II, where scandal, homicide, suicide, incest, and moral hypocrisy belie its tranquil façade. It is based on Grace Metalious's bestselling 1956 novel of the same name.

Released in December 1957, Peyton Place was a major box-office success, though its omission of the novel's sexually explicit material was widely criticized. The film was nominated for nine Academy Awards, including Best Picture. It won none, tying the then-record set by The Little Foxes for most nominations with no wins.

== Plot ==
In the New England town of Peyton Place, Paul Cross, fed up with his alcoholic stepfather, Lucas Cross, for his stealing, leaves town. Lucas is the school custodian and his downtrodden wife, Nellie, works as housekeeper for Constance "Connie" MacKenzie, a widow who owns a clothing shop. The daughters of both families, Allison MacKenzie and Selena Cross, are best friends and about to graduate from high school. While the MacKenzies live a comfortable life, the Cross family lives in poverty.

At Peyton Place High School, town newcomer Michael Rossi has been hired as the new principal by school board president Leslie Harrington; the students had favored veteran teacher Elsie Thornton. Rossi wins Ms. Thornton over by offering to work with her.

Connie allows Allison to have an unchaperoned birthday party. She invites her classmates, including the overtly sexual Betty Anderson and her boyfriend, Rodney Harrington. Connie is horrified to arrive home and find the teens, including Allison, making out. The next morning, Allison goes to meet Selena for church. She witnesses and then intervenes during an altercation between Lucas and Selena.

Allison is named class valedictorian, and Rossi asks Connie to help chaperone the graduation dance; the two gradually develop a romantic relationship. Meanwhile, Harrington disapproves of his son, Rodney, dating Betty. Rodney then invites Allison to the dance, though she likes Norman Page, a shy, bookish boy raised by an emotionally abusive mother. During the dance, Rodney takes Betty to his car and tries to make out with her, but she remains angry that Rodney broke up with her. Rossi asks Ms. Thornton to give a short speech and lead the song "Auld Lang Syne". This annoys Marion Partridge, a member of the school board and a malicious gossip.

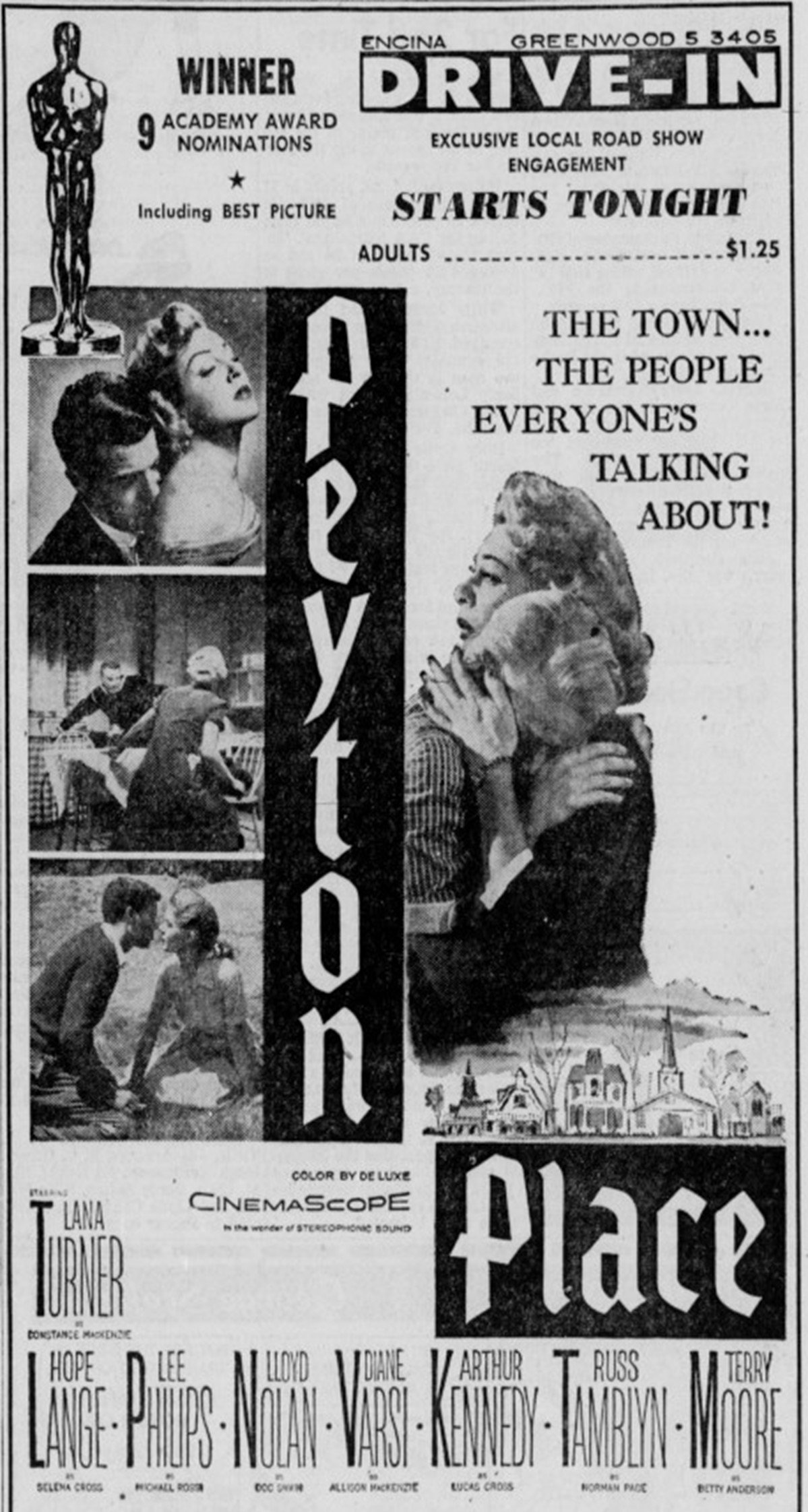
Drive-in advertisement from 1958

Shortly after, Lucas rapes and impregnates Selena. She goes to Dr. Matthew Swain. He assumes Selena's boyfriend, Ted, is the father, but Selena breaks down and admits Lucas raped her. Furious, Dr. Swain forces Lucas to sign a confession that he will keep secret if Lucas permanently leaves town. Unknown to either, Nellie overhears their conversation. A vengeful Lucas chases Selena when she returns home. Selena escapes but falls, starting a miscarriage. Dr. Swain records it as an appendectomy to protect Selena from scandal.

At the Labor Day parade, Rodney and Betty make up and go skinny dipping; nearby, Allison and Norman are also swimming, wearing bathing suits. When Marion and Charles Partridge see a naked couple, they believe it is Allison and Norman and tell Connie. During an ensuing argument with Allison, Connie angrily blurts out that Allison is illegitimate, the result of an affair she had with Allison's still living and already-married father. Upset, Allison runs upstairs, only to find that Nellie, distraught over Lucas, has committed suicide. Some time later, Rodney and Betty elope, infuriating Rodney's father, who nevertheless offers his son a job at the mill. Bitter at her mother, Allison leaves home for New York City.

When World War II breaks out, many of Peyton Place's young men enlist. When Rodney is killed in action, his bereaved father finally accepts Betty as family after she explains she only acted racy to attract Rodney. During Christmas 1942, Connie visits Rossi and admits her affair. Rossi still wants to marry her.

A drunken Lucas returns to town and attempts to rape Selena again. She bludgeons him to death in self-defense, then she and her younger brother, Joey, hide the body. After Easter 1943, Selena breaks down and tells Connie that she killed Lucas. After Connie reports Selena to the police, Selena is arrested and tried. Allison returns for the trial, as does Norman. The truth about Selena killing Lucas in self-defense, his physical and sexual abuse, and Dr. Swain's false medical report all come to light. Dr. Swain openly berates the townspeople for their constant vicious gossip and rumors. Selena is acquitted and the town sympathetically reaches out to her; she and Ted are free to marry. Allison approaches Connie, wanting to reconcile; Norman is welcomed into the house.

== Cast ==
- Lana Turner as Constance MacKenzie
- Diane Varsi as Allison MacKenzie
- Hope Lange as Selena Cross
- Lee Philips as Michael Rossi
- Arthur Kennedy as Lucas Cross
- Lloyd Nolan as Dr. Matthew Swain
- Russ Tamblyn as Norman Page
- Terry Moore as Betty Anderson
- David Nelson as Ted Carter
- Barry Coe as Rodney Harrington
- Betty Field as Nellie Cross
- Mildred Dunnock as Miss Elsie Thornton
- Leon Ames as Leslie Harrington
- Lorne Greene as District Attorney
- Staats Cotsworth as Charles Partridge
- Peg Hillias as Marion Partridge
- Robert H. Harris as Seth Bushwell
- Tami Conner as Margie (a classmate of Selena and Allison)
- Erin O'Brien-Moore as Mrs. Evelyn Page
- Scotty Morrow as Joey Cross (uncredited)
- William Lundmark as Paul Cross (uncredited)
- Edwin Jerome as Cory Hyde (uncredited)
- Edith Clair as Miss Colton (uncredited)

Cast notes

- Both Diane Varsi and Lee Philips made their film debuts in Peyton Place. Varsi's role had been offered to Susan Strasberg who turned it down.
- The film marked the first time that David Nelson had appeared separately from his family, Ozzie, Harriet, and Ricky.
- Erin O'Brien-Moore, who played Mrs. Evelyn Page, played Nurse Esther Choate in the 1960s Peyton Place TV series.

== Production ==
=== Development ===
Less than a month after the novel's release in October 1956, producer Jerry Wald bought the rights from author Grace Metalious for $250,000 and hired her as a story consultant on the film, though he had no intention of allowing her to contribute anything to the production. Her presence in Hollywood ensured the project additional publicity, but Metalious soon felt out of place there. "I regarded the men who made Peyton Place as workers in a gigantic flesh factory," she recalled, "and they looked upon me as a nut who should go back to the farm."

The screenplay, by John Michael Hayes, omits many of the novel's sexually explicit moments, because Hayes was working under the Hays Code, which restricted depictions of content the U.S. Motion Picture Production Code deemed explicit.

Mark Robson said the script "went through at least eleven drafts. The first one I read was about two hundred and sixty pages. While it was imperfect, and structurally wrong, still one could see that it was possible—with hard work—to pull it together. Jerry was tireless, and John Michael Hayes worked extremely hard; on a weekend he would rewrite a whole script. The final screenplay was written on the stage as the film was actually being made."

John Michael Hayes said "I tried to tell the story of the difficulty adolescents have passing through that invisible pane of glass as they become adults. I examined the turmoil they go through, especially in the town of Peyton Place. I was sympathetic to these young people. The first draft was nearly three hundred pages, and it took eight drafts to finally boil it down."

Metalious was horrified by what she deemed a sanitized version of her novel, and was also displeased with the thought of the casting of Pat Boone as Norman Page (the role was eventually given to Russ Tamblyn). She returned to her home in Gilmanton, New Hampshire, and publicly derided the film, though she eventually earned a total of $400,000 in exhibition profits from it.

Hayes said "everybody had read the book, so we couldn't disappoint them—without offending the censors and without offending the other countries in which it would be seen. Getting the Catholic Church's Legion of Decency seal was probably the most difficult thing. People felt it was a book that couldn't be made into a picture. We had to make it acceptable but entertaining and good. And the Legion didn't change a line."

=== Filming ===
It was difficult to find a state that was willing to allow itself be used as a location. Eventually Governor Muskie allowed filming in Maine.

Principal photography of Peyton Place began on June 4, 1957. The film's exterior sequences were shot primarily in mid-coastal Maine, mostly in Camden, Maine, with additional exteriors filmed in Belfast, Maine; Rockland, Maine; Thomaston, Maine; and Lake Placid, New York. Additional interior photography was completed on film sets in Los Angeles. All of Turner's scenes were shot in California.

=== Musical score ===
The film's score is by Franz Waxman, and was recorded by the Royal Scottish National Orchestra. The score was released on CD for the first time in 1999. In 2016, journalist Graydon Carter praised the score as "haunting" and "instantly recognizable even today". In 2005, the American Film Institute recognized the score in its 100 Years of Film Scores, for which it received a nomination.

Track listing

All tracks are written by Waxman.

No.	Title	Length
1.	"Main Title"	3:55
2.	"Entering Peyton Place"	1:37
3.	"Going to School"	1:25
4.	"After School"	3:40
5.	"Hilltop Scene"	6:49
6.	"Rossi's Visit"	3:02
7.	"After the Dance"	2:31
8.	"The Rape"	2:10
9.	"Summer Montage"	1:21
10.	"Chase in the Woods"	2:31
11.	"Swimming Scene"	5:40
12.	"Constance's Story"	1:58
13.	"Allison's Decision"	2:12
14.	"Leaving for New York"	1:48
15.	"Peyton Place Draftees"	3:22
16.	"Honor Roll"	2:21
17.	"Love Me, Michael / End Title"	2:01
18.	"End Credits"	1:42
Total length:		50:05

== Release ==
=== Box office ===
The film premiered in Camden one day before opening in 24 cities across the U.S. on December 12, 1957.

Peyton Place was the second highest-grossing film released in the United States in 1957, and received significant public interest in April 1958, after Lana Turner's daughter, Cheryl, killed Turner's abusive boyfriend, Johnny Stompanato, during a domestic struggle. Though Cheryl was acquitted on the grounds of justifiable homicide, the press coverage boosted ticket sales for Peyton Place by 32% in April 1958. The film ultimately earned $11 million in domestic rentals (equivalent to $126,095,972 in 2025).

In October 1958 Variety estimated the film made $30 million worldwide.

=== Critical reception ===
Peyton Place was a commercial hit, but many critics noted that the most salacious elements of Metalious's novel had been whitewashed or excised completely. In The New York Times, Bosley Crowther wrote, "There is no sense of massive corruption here", but he did like the film overall, praising Hope Lange's "gentle and sensitive performance" and finding Lloyd Nolan "excellent." Variety wrote that the film was "impressively acted by an excellent cast" but noted that "in leaning backwards not to offend, Wald and Hayes have gone acrobatic ... On the screen is not the unpleasant sex-secret little town against which Grace Metalious set her story. These aren't the gossiping, spiteful, immoral people she portrayed. There are hints of this in the film, but only hints." Richard L. Coe of The Washington Post wrote, "While the four-letter words of the Grace Metalious novel have been adroitly erased, it's easy for one of the apparent few who didn't read the book to see why so many did. There are several strong stories and the characters are sharply drawn. Without these two characteristics the best written novels remain unread." Edwin Schallert of the Los Angeles Times called the film "probably the most powerful small-town picture ever produced" and Harrison's Reports praised it as "an absorbing adult drama" that "grips one's attention the whole time it is on the screen, thanks to the sensitive direction and the effective acting of the capable cast." Stanley Kauffmann of The New Republic wrote, "The film is better than the book."

John McCarten of The New Yorker wrote that the film "makes no attempt to exploit the sensational aspects of the tale it has to tell; on the contrary, it is woefully diffuse, and before it's over—roughly, three hours—boredom has set in like the grippe." The Monthly Film Bulletin wrote, "Slick and passionless, the film is an expensive and heavily bowdlerised adaptation of Grace Metalious' best-seller", adding that "the film never quite makes up its mind whether to extol small-town America or castigate it." TV Guide wrote, "This is the kind of hypertensive trash that gives melodrama a bad name, cynically tempering its naughty bits with smug moralizing. The fact that the film won an 'A' rating from the Catholic Legion of Decency, meaning it was deemed 'acceptable to all', is a dead giveaway." (In fact, it was given an "A-III" rating, meaning appropriate only for adults.)

In the years since its release, critics have continued to comment on the film's sterilized screenplay, though Graydon Carter wrote in 2016, "Despite the movie's almost picture-postcard tone of whimsy, it did manage to retain some of Grace's finger-pointing—most notably in a stunning montage of duplicitous citizens filing into a myriad of churches, all dressed in their Sunday best."

Stephen Vagg in FilmInk felt Tamblyn gave the best performance in the film, "giving off this sort of twisted, sick vibe, full of tormented pain and suffering – you know that character has been through a lot, even if he is considerably less messed up in the film than the book."

=== Accolades ===
The film received nine Academy Award nominations and no wins, tying a record set by The Little Foxes. This was later surpassed by The Turning Point and The Color Purple, both of which received 11 nominations and no wins.

Award	Category	Nominee(s)	Result	Ref.
Academy Awards	Best Motion Picture	Jerry Wald	Nominated	
Academy Awards	Best Director	Mark Robson	Nominated	
Academy Awards	Best Actress	Lana Turner	Nominated	
Academy Awards	Best Supporting Actor	Arthur Kennedy	Nominated	
Academy Awards	Best Supporting Actor	Russ Tamblyn	Nominated	
Academy Awards	Best Supporting Actress	Hope Lange	Nominated	
Academy Awards	Best Supporting Actress	Diane Varsi	Nominated	
Academy Awards	Best Screenplay – Based on Material from Another Medium	John Michael Hayes	Nominated	
Academy Awards	Best Cinematography	William C. Mellor	Nominated	
Directors Guild of America Awards	Outstanding Directorial Achievement in Motion Pictures	Mark Robson	Nominated	
Golden Globe Awards	Best Supporting Actress – Motion Picture	Mildred Dunnock	Nominated	
Golden Globe Awards	Best Supporting Actress – Motion Picture	Hope Lange	Nominated	
Golden Globe Awards	Most Promising Newcomer – Female	Diane Varsi	Won	
Laurel Awards	Top Drama		Won	
Laurel Awards	Top Female Dramatic Performance	Lana Turner	Nominated	
Laurel Awards	Top Male Supporting Performance	Arthur Kennedy	Nominated	
Laurel Awards	Top Female Supporting Performance	Betty Field	Nominated	
Laurel Awards	Top Female Supporting Performance	Diane Varsi	Nominated	
Writers Guild of America Awards	Best Written American Drama	John Michael Hayes	Nominated	

=== Home media ===
20th Century Fox Home Entertainment released Peyton Place on DVD in 2004, featuring an audio commentary by Terry Moore and Russ Tamblyn, an AMC-produced documentary on the film, and vintage newsreel footage. The film had its debut on Blu-ray in 2017 by Twilight Time, in an edition limited to 3,000 copies. The Blu-ray repurposes the bonus materials from the 20th Century Fox DVD, and adds a new commentary by filmmaker and historian Willard Carroll.

== Sequels, spin-offs, and legacy ==
Peyton Place was followed up with a movie sequel, Return to Peyton Place in 1961, then a TV series in 1964. A follow-up TV series, Return to Peyton Place, was broadcast in 1972 but this was a follow-up to the earlier TV series and only loosely connected to the two movies.

Both the film and the series were significant sources of inspiration for David Lynch and Mark Frost's Twin Peaks, which first aired in 1990. The series has been widely acclaimed and is often listed among the greatest television series of all time.

== See also ==
- List of American films of 1957
- Illegitimacy in fiction
