= Julian Messner =

Former American publishing house

Julian Messner, Inc.
- Parent company: Simon & Schuster (1966–1998)
- Status: Defunct (1999)
- Founded: 1933
- Founder: Julian and Kathryn Messner
- Successor: Pearson Education
- Country of origin: United States
- Headquarters location: New York City

Julian Messner, Inc. was an American publishing house founded in 1933. Its best-selling books included 1956's Peyton Place. In the 1960s it became a division of Simon & Schuster, and continued as a children's imprint into the 1990s.

== History ==
Julian Messner, previously an executive with Boni & Liveright, and his wife Kathryn founded the firm in 1933, opening an office on West 40th Street in Manhattan, and planning to publish juvenile books along with a small offering of adult books. They published four books in their first year, including Senator Marlowe's Daughter by Frances Parkinson Keyes.

When Julian Messner died in 1948, Kathryn (they divorced in 1944) became president. At first the idea of a woman president caused concern, and the board appointed a vice-president in charge of the president, an anomaly which soon became clear was not needed. She served as president until her death in August 1964; the company was sold by the end of the year to Pocket Books. Pocket was then acquired by Simon & Schuster in 1966, during the 1960s wave of consolidation in the publishing industry.

"Julian Messner" continued as a children's imprint under Simon & Schuster (S&S). The imprint later fell under Macmillan Library Reference (S&S had acquired Macmillan, Inc., in 1994, and Pearson acquired the educational, professional, and reference businesses of S&S in 1998), and shut down six children's imprints including Julian Messner in 1999.

In 1958, the company published a fictionalized biography of baseball player Warren Spahn for young readers, which was full of incorrect information and even positive false claims (such as claiming that Spahn had won a Bronze Star, which was untrue). Spahn prevailed in a lawsuit against Messner, which is a leading case in the concept of false light, a claim related to defamation.
