= Mary K. Wells =

American television writer (1920–2000)

Mary K. Wells (December 1, 1920 – August 14, 2000) was an American television writer and actress. She acted on Return to Peyton Place, The Secret Storm, The Brighter Day, As the World Turns, The Searching Wind, George Abbott's Three Men on a Horse, Any Wednesday (with Sandy Dennis), Edward Albee's Everything in the Garden, The Edge of Night (as Louise Grimsley Capice), Big Town (as Lorelei Kilbourne), and Love of Life. She wrote for All My Children from 1973 to 1993. She was nominated for 14 Daytime Emmys and won twice (1985 & 1988).
