= Grace Metalious =

American-French writer (1924–1964)

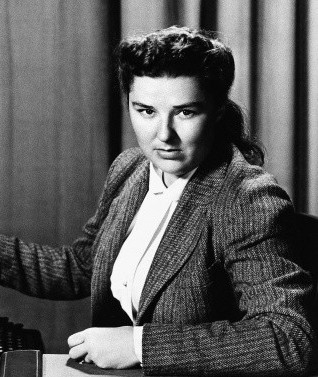
- Metalious in 1957
- Born: Marie Grace DeRepentigny; September 8, 1924; Manchester, New Hampshire, U.S.
- Died: February 25, 1964 (aged 39); Boston, Massachusetts, U.S.
- Occupation: Novelist
- Spouse(s): George Metalious (1943-1958; div. remarried 1960-1963. separated); T.J. Martin (1958-1960; div.)
- Children: 3
- Writing career
- Notable work: Peyton Place

Marie Grace Metalious (Née DeRepentigny; September 8, 1924 – February 25, 1964) was an American author known for her novel Peyton Place, one of the best selling works in publishing history.

== Early life ==
Marie Grace DeRepentigny was born into poverty and a broken home in the mill town of Manchester, New Hampshire. Writing from an early age, at Manchester Central High School, she acted in school plays. After graduation, she married George Metalious in a Catholic church in Manchester in 1943, and became a housewife and mother. The couple lived in near squalor, but she continued to write. With one child, the couple moved to Durham, New Hampshire, where George attended the University of New Hampshire. In Durham, Grace Metalious began writing seriously. When George graduated, he took a position as principal at a school in Gilmanton, New Hampshire.

== Peyton Place ==
In the fall of 1954, at age 30, Metalious began work on a manuscript about the dark secrets of a small New England town. The novel had the working title The Tree and the Blossom. By the spring of 1955, she had finished the first draft. By her husband's account, both Metaliouses regarded The Tree and the Blossom as an unwieldy title and decided to give the town a name that could be the book's title. They first considered "Potter Place" (the name of a real community near Andover, New Hampshire). Realizing their town should have a fictional name, they looked through an atlas and found "Payton" (a town in Texas). They combined this with Place and changed the "a" to an "e". Thus Peyton Place was born, prompting her comment, "Wonderful—that's it, George. Peyton Place. Peyton Place, New Hampshire. Peyton Place, New England. Peyton Place, USA. Truly a composite of all small towns where ugliness rears its head, and where the people try to hide all the skeletons in their closets." Other accounts say her publishers changed the name.

Metalious found an agent, M. Jacques Chambrun, who submitted the draft manuscript to three major publishers. In the summer of 1955, Leona Nevler, a freelance manuscript reader, read it for Lippincott and liked it, but knew it was too steamy for a major publisher to accept. She showed it to Kathryn G. ("Kitty") Messner, president and editor-in-chief of the small firm Julian Messner. Messner immediately acquired the novel and asked Nevler to step in as a freelance editor for final polishing before publication.

== Publishing phenomenon ==
In the summer of 1956, the Metalious family moved into a new hilltop house, and a publicity campaign was launched for the book, published on September 24, 1956. Dismissed by most critics, it nevertheless remained on The New York Times bestseller list for more than a year and became an international phenomenon.

The town of Peyton Place was a combination of several New Hampshire towns: Gilmanton, where Metalious lived (and which resented the notoriety); Laconia, the only nearby town of comparable size to Peyton Place and site of Metalious's favorite bar; and the neighboring towns of Alton and Belmont. The village of Gilmanton Ironworks is where in December 1946, a daughter had murdered her sexually abusive father (upon which incident the book is partly based). The sheriff of Belknap County, Homer Crockett, and members of the New Hampshire State Police investigated the murder. Hollywood lost no time in cashing in on the book's success—a year after its publication, the heavily sanitized movie Peyton Place was a major box-office hit. The movie's premiere was held at the Colonial Theatre in Laconia, New Hampshire. A prime-time television series that began airing the fall after Metalious's death (on ABC-TV, from 1964 to 1969) was a ratings success as well.

Metalious's publisher promoted her in a photo captioned "Pandora in Blue Jeans". Commenting on her critics, she observed, "If I'm a lousy writer, then an awful lot of people have lousy taste". Of her work's frankness, she said, "Even Tom Sawyer had a girlfriend, and to talk about adults without talking about their sex drives is like talking about a window without glass."

== Later works ==
Metalious's other novels sold well but not as well as her first. Return to Peyton Place (Nov. 24, 1959) was followed by The Tight White Collar (Sept. 24, 1960) and No Adam in Eden (Sept. 24, 1963). Three of her four novels were published on September 24.

== Death ==
Suffering from cirrhosis of the liver from years of heavy drinking, Metalious died on February 25, 1964, at age 39. "If I had to do it over again", she once said, "it would be easier to be poor. Before I was successful, I was as happy as anyone gets." She is buried in Smith Meeting House Cemetery in Gilmanton.

Hours before her death, Metalious was convinced by her final lover, John Rees, to sign a will leaving him her entire estate, with the understanding that he would take care of her children. Her family was able to invalidate the will, but to little avail, as her estate proved to be insolvent from years of lavish living, generosity to "friends", and embezzlement by an agent. At the time of her death, she had bank accounts totaling $41,174 and debts of more than $200,000.

== Legacy ==
After Metalious's death, Peyton Place resurfaced as the setting for nine novels by Don Tracy (1905–1976), writing as Roger Fuller, including Evils of Peyton Place (1969) and Temptations of Peyton Place (1970), but this series had only modest sales.

In 1968, songwriter Tom T. Hall compared his fictional small town of Harper Valley, also a cauldron of scandal bubbling under the surface, to Peyton Place. His song "Harper Valley PTA" became a number one hit for Jeannie C. Riley, who also recorded a song called "Satan Place".

In 2005, novelist Barbara Delinsky used Metalious and Peyton Place as a springboard for Looking for Peyton Place, her novel about the impact of Metalious's book on a small New Hampshire town, Middle River, where residents believe Peyton Place is about their community.

In 2006, it was announced that Sandra Bullock was slated to star in and co-produce a biopic of Metalious's life, but the film was never made.

In 2007, the Manchester Historic Association and the University of New Hampshire at Manchester honored Metalious with an in-depth examination of her life and most famous book. The celebration, which included lectures, readings of her work, and screenings of the 1957 film, marked the area's first public acknowledgment of its native daughter.

== See also ==
- Illegitimacy in fiction
