= Murder in Peyton Place =

- Genre: Mystery
- Based on: Peyton Place by Grace Metalious
- Screenplay by: Richard De Roy
- Directed by: Bruce Kessler
- Starring: Dorothy Malone; Ed Nelson; Tim O'Connor; Joyce Jillson; Christopher Connelly; Janet Margolin; Marj Dusay; James Booth; David Hedison; Stella Stevens; Charles Siebert
- Theme music composer: Laurence Rosenthal

Production
- Executive producer: Paul Monash
- Producer: Peter Katz
- Cinematography: Gert Andersen
- Editor: Bud S. Isaacs
- Running time: 100 minutes
- Production companies: 20th Century Fox Television; Peter Katz Productions

Original release
- Network: NBC
- Release: October 3, 1977

Related
- Peyton Place; Peyton Place: The Next Generation

Murder in Peyton Place is a 1977 American made-for-television mystery-drama film directed by Bruce Kessler. The film is based on the 1964–1969 TV series Peyton Place and it was billed as a reunion movie. It first aired on NBC Monday Night at the Movies on October 3, 1977. It focuses on the mysterious deaths of Rodney Harrington and Allison MacKenzie, as well as a diabolical plot of a powerful person to ruin the community.

== Plot ==
Stella Chernak (Stella Stevens) arrives at the Peyton Tower Hotel in Peyton Place after an absence of numerous years. She has returned to destroy the small town, and is able to use her power through Jay Kamens (Norman Burton), the president of the Peyton Mills and her trustee. Another former citizen returning to Peyton Place is Betty Anderson (Janet Margolin). Although she is now married to David Roerick (Edward Bell), she agreed to a secret meeting with her ex-husband Rodney Harrington near Peyton Place. Her friend Denise Haley (Charlotte Stewart) offers her a roof, despite her husband Stan Haley's (Jonathan Goldsmith) objections about her presence.

Another resident dissatisfied with Betty's arrival is Constance MacKenzie (Dorothy Malone), who fears that Betty will interfere with Rodney's relationship with her daughter Allison MacKenzie. Betty sneaks out of the Haley house at night to meet with Rodney somewhere near Peyton Place, but witnesses the Winnebago crashing and exploding in which Rodney and Allison are driving. The town is in deep sorrow when it is revealed that Rodney and Allison have died. Rodney's brother Norman Harrington (Christopher Connelly), now married to Jill (Joyce Jillson), refuses to accept that Rodney and Allison have died because of drunk driving, which the police have concluded after finding alcohol in the RV.

Along with Betty and lawyer Steven Cord (David Hedison), Norman starts an investigation to find out what really happened on the night when Rodney and Allison died. He is unaware that Jill's family is somehow involved with the origins of the car accident, and her father Bo Buehler (Royal Dano) even witnessed the car crash. The research endangers both Steven and Betty's marriage; Steven's wife Carla (Linda Gray) suspects that he is somehow involved with Betty after he was out all night, and Betty's husband David does not understand why she is staying in Peyton Place. Betty's marriage is saved; Steven and Carla's fate together remains uncertain. Norman, Betty and Steven eventually conclude that the powerful company New Star Corporation is trying to take over Peyton Place by sabotaging the town's water supply.

In the hospital, Constance and her husband Elliot Carson (Tim O'Connor) are brought in to identify the bodies. Elliot claims that the girl on the table is not Allison, after which doctor Tommy Crimpton (James Booth) is held responsible and gets fired by Ellen Considine (Marj Dusay). Ellen is the secretary and lover of doctor Michael Rossi (Ed Nelson), who has come to town to hide a dark secret from the past involving her teenage son Andy (Christopher S. Nelson). Andy feels attracted to Jill's younger sister Bonnie (Kimberly Beck), who in her turn is blackmailed by lovestruck teen Billie Kaiserman (David Kyle) due to her affair with Stan.

Meanwhile, Norman hires a musician named Springer (Kaz Garas) to find out who is the head of New Star Corporation. Springer breaks in its office, and while going through documents, he finds out that Stella is the boss of New Star Corporation, and that two days before their death, Rodney and Allison went through the same documents. Springer tries to warn Norman about this, but he is shot by Stella's servant Tristan (Robert Deman) before he can. Hereafter, Stella allows Elliot's request for an inquest, because she is certain that some of the medical examiners hired by her will give the court a false death cause. The examiners were able to interfere due to Crimpton blackmailing Ellen with the information that Andy has spent three years in a hospital for the criminally insane for arson. Stella was not aware, though, that Dr. Rossi examined the bodies himself and found out that Rodney and Allison were shot to death. Afterwards, Steven orders a warrant for Stella.

Stella is, along with Crimpton and other accomplices, in the Peyton Tower Hotel, where they are keeping Jill as a hostage. Norman receives a threat note to sabotage the inquest if he wants to see his wife ever again. Instead, he and Michael set out to the Peyton Tower Hotel, where they try to stop Stella. It results in a major fight, during which Stella falls to her death from the balcony.

== Cast ==
Starring

- Dorothy Malone as Constance MacKenzie, the worried mother of the recently killed Allison and the wife of Elliot Carson.
- Ed Nelson as Michael Rossi, a doctor at the Peyton Hospital and a close friend of the Carsons. He has a relationship with Ellen, and becomes involved with the examination of Rodney and Allison's bodies.
- Tim O'Connor as Elliot Carson, the owner of the local newspaper and husband of Constance who turns to anger and investigation when his daughter Allison dies.
- Joyce Jillson as Jill Harrington, a daughter of the Buehler family and the jealous wife of Norman, as well as the mother of Kelly and Leslie. She is later held hostage, and thereby plays a large role in solving the murder mystery.
- Christopher Connelly as Norman Harrington, the brother of recently killed Rodney Harrington, and husband of Jill. The first one to suspect that Rodney and Allison were murdered, Norman leads a private investigation.

Mia Farrow is also included in the opening credits, "as she appeared in her original role". However, her appearance consists solely of archive footage from the original show.

Guest starring

- Janet Margolin as Betty Anderson Roerick, the estranged wife of David Roerick who returns to Peyton Place for a secret meeting with her ex-husband Rodney. She later helps Norman with his investigation.
- Marj Dusay as Ellen Considine, the secretary of Michael Rossi, as well as his lover. She has recently moved to Peyton Place and is keeping a dark secret.
- James Booth as Tommy Crimpton, a doctor at the Peyton Hospital who - as an order of Stella - tries to sabotage the medical examination.
- David Hedison as Steven Cord, a lawyer who teams with Norman to find out how Rodney and Allison have died. He is in a shaky marriage with Carla.

Special guest star

- Stella Stevens as Stella Chernak, the film's antagonist; Stella has returned to Peyton Place with the intention of destroying it, to avenge her brother's death.

Also starring

- Jonathan Goldsmith as Stan Haley, a security officer who is married to Denise. He has an affair with underage teenager Bonnie..
- Charlotte Stewart as Denise Haley, Stan's wife and a good friend of Betty.
- Kaz Garas as Springer
- Kimberly Beck as Bonnie Buehler, an attractive but promiscuous teenager who has an affair with Stan. She furthermore takes an interest in Andy and Stinger, and wants to leave town to become a stewardess after she starts getting blackmailed.
- Linda Gray as Carla Cord, Steven's distrustful wife who is worried about her husband's secretive and tentative nature.
- Norman Burton as Jay Kamens, the president of the Peyton Mills. A powerful, but scheming man who helps Stella in her mission to destroy Peyton Place.
- Charles Siebert as Kaiserman

Co-starring

- Priscilla Morrill as Mae Buehler, the wife of Bo and mother of Jill and Bonnie. She is the owner of the local trailer park.
- Fred Sadoff as Dr. Jensen
- Royal Dano as Bo Buehler, Jill and Bonnie's father who is usually in a bad mood. Mysterious, he has more information about Allison and Rodney's death.
- Robert Deman as Tristan, the faithful servant of Kamens and Stella, and an accomplice in several illegal activities.
- Ed Bell as David Roerick, Betty's estranged husband who reaches out to her several times during her stay in Peyton Place.
- Christopher Stafford Nelson as Andy Considine, the shy, 16-year-old son of Ellen who has a dark past. He falls in love with Bonnie.
- David Kyle as Billie Kaiserman, a teenager who falls in love with Bonnie. Because she does not respond to his love, he starts blackmailing her.

== Production ==
Based on the prime time soap opera that aired from 1964 to 1969, Murder in Peyton Place brought back original cast members Dorothy Malone, Ed Nelson, Tim O'Connor, Joyce Jillson, and Christopher Connelly. Barbara Parkins declined an offer to reprise her role of Betty Anderson, and Lee Grant (Stella Chernak in the original series) and James Douglas (Steven Cord in the original series) had commitments to other projects. Producer Peter Katz did not approach Mia Farrow and Ryan O'Neal to return as Allison MacKenzie and Rodney Harrington, because he "didn't think they would be interested." Farrow and O'Neal, by the time, had successful film careers, which kept them from making television appearances.

Connelly admitted that he was not enthusiastic on returning as Norman Harrington, but he took the role anyway because otherwise he would be unoccupied:

"It was like going back while everyone else was moving on. Like Ryan and Mia and Lee. It was like going back and doing your first job over again. But I wasn't busy. It can only really do me good, which it has. The really strange thing was sitting around the set with the other original cast members and trying to figure out who was who. Trying to remember what character was married to who, who was the father. It became hysterical."

Connelly recalled that the most positive aspect of the film was that, while filming, he made contacts that landed him the role of Mark Twain in another TV film, Incredible Rocky Mountain Race (1977). He signed on to the film in June 1977 along with Ed Nelson, and shortly after Tim O'Connor and Dorothy Malone were revealed as cast members. Meanwhile, actor Christopher S. Nelson - son of other cast member Ed Nelson - was more positive on the film, which to him "felt like a homecoming." Another cast member more positive about the revisit was Malone, who was glad to show up on the set in Texas.

== Reception ==
Murder in Peyton Place received generally negative reviews, with the reviewer of the Los Angeles Times calling it "dull" and furthermore wrote: "Pretend that you're a network programmer and someone gives you this idea--a really crackerjack notion of how grand it would be to get the gang from Peyton Place together again. You could toss in some hopelessly convoluted, arteriosclerotic plot, have them cry and overact (and generally humble their professional integrity) for two interminable hours and call it Murder in Peyton Place. Bingo!"

Of the entire Peyton Place franchise, Murder in Peyton Place was often called "the most forgettable".
