= George Anderson (Peyton Place) =

- Peyton Place character
- Portrayed by: Henry Beckman
- First appearance: September 24, 1964 (#4)
- Last appearance: April 8, 1965 (#59)
In-universe information
- Occupation: Co-worker in Peyton Mills (onscreen)
- Family: Betty Anderson (daughter); Rodney Harrington (son-in-law); Lois Anderson (sister-in-law)
- Spouse: Julie Anderson

George Anderson is a fictional character on the television drama Peyton Place. He was portrayed by Henry Beckman.

== Character history ==
George is married to Julie Anderson and the father of Betty Anderson. He is a salesman for Leslie Harrington. George was an aggressive man and took his frustrations out on his wife. This was discovered by Dr. Michael Rossi, who threatened to expose him. Julie got afraid of her husband and tried to persuade him to go into therapy.

When his daughter marries Rodney Harrington, George was one of the few who supported it. They get involved in a car accident, and George blames Rodney for it. Betty suffers a miscarriage, but George persuades his daughter to lie about it. Leslie disapproved of Betty as his daughter-in-law. This was the cause for many clashes between him and George.

At one point, George became bad at doing his job. After losing yet another client, he turns to drinking and abuses his wife. Julie protects herself and knocks him unconscious. He is brought to the hospital and Julie runs to Constance MacKenzie. It is there where she announces she is going to leave him.

When Betty leaves town for New York City, George blames Rodney and threatens to kill him if she doesn't return anytime soon. He later loses his mind at his job and locks himself up in the office with a gun. It is his only friend Elliot Carson who is able to break in and calm him down. Dr. Rossi tells Julie that George is manic-depressive and he is taken to a sanitarium.

George has become delusional in this period, but seems to become well after a while. He is allowed to visit Peyton Place and has a drink with Paul Hanley. Paul tells him about Leslie's affairs with several married women, including Julie. He manipulates him into killing Leslie. He breaks into the Harrington house, but shoots Elliot by accident. George is yet again sent to the sanitarium, but this time never returns.
