= Paul Hanley =

Paul Hanley may refer to:

- Paul Hanley (tennis) (born 1977), Australian tennis player
- Paul Hanley (Peyton Place), fictional character
