= Bruce Gordon (American actor) =

American actor (1916–2011)

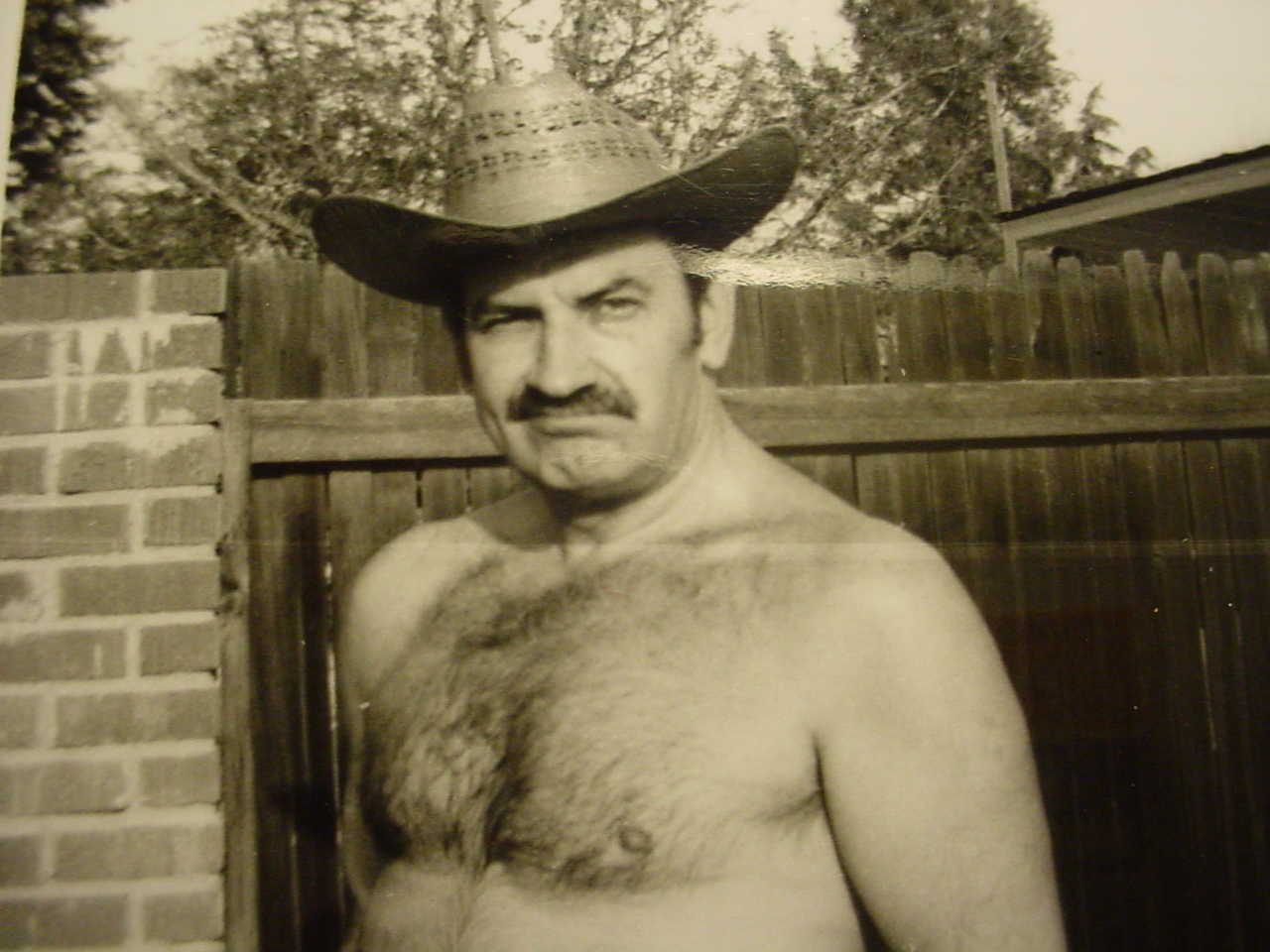
- Gordon in 1970
- Born: February 1, 1916; Fitchburg, Massachusetts, U.S.
- Died: January 20, 2011 (aged 94); Santa Fe, New Mexico, U.S.
- Occupation: Actor
- Years active: 1948–1989
- Spouse: Marla Gordon

Bruce Gordon (February 1, 1916 – January 20, 2011) was an American actor best known for playing gangster Frank Nitti in the ABC television series The Untouchables. His acting career ranged over a half century and included stage, movies, and a varied number of roles on the small screen.

== Early life ==
Gordon was born in Fitchburg, Massachusetts. His first appearance on Broadway was in 1937 in the musical drama The Fireman's Flame. From 1941 to 1945, he played the role of Officer Klein alongside Boris Karloff in the original cast of Arsenic and Old Lace on Broadway. He had an "Introducing" credit in the 1949 Marx Brothers film Love Happy.

== Television ==
On television, he appeared in numerous episodes of such early programs as The Goldbergs, The Nash Airflyte Theater, Studio One, Justice, Kraft Television Theatre, Robert Montgomery Presents, The Californians, Whirlybirds, Colgate Theatre, Tales of Wells Fargo, and the premiere episode of Decoy.

In 1958, Gordon appeared in a memorable bit role as one of Jean Lafitte's pirates in Anthony Quinn's movie spectacle The Buccaneer, alongside a cast including Yul Brynner, Charlton Heston and Claire Bloom. He had a similar role in 1960 as the character Garnett in the episode "Forbidden Island" of the NBC western television series, Riverboat, starring Darren McGavin as the captain of the vessel, the Enterprise. The episode focuses on Cajun outlaws who inhabit a remote island in the Mississippi River. Gordon appeared in the syndicated western series, Man Without a Gun, starring Rex Reason. In 1958, he guest starred on the NBC western Jefferson Drum and on the same network's adventure series Northwest Passage, with co-stars Keith Larsen and Buddy Ebsen. Gordon's role was that of a sadistic prison official. The program was based on Kenneth Roberts' 1937 novel about Major Robert Rogers and his efforts to help the British during the French and Indian War. That same year, Gordon was cast as Myers, the trigger man in the episode "The Stool Pigeon" of the syndicated series U.S. Marshal, starring John Bromfield. Also in 1958, he guest-starred in Season 3, Episode 19 of Gunsmoke ("Kitty Caught") and later in Episode 1 of Season 4, “Matt for Murder." He also appeared in Robert Culp's Western series Trackdown in the episode "The Mistake" as the character Steve Marriner. During the 1958–1959 season he was part of the regular cast of the NBC dramatic series Behind Closed Doors.

Gordon made four guest appearances on Perry Mason. In 1959, he played murder victim Frank Thatcher in "The Case of Paul Drake's Dilemma," for which Mason's private detective Paul Drake was accused of the crime. In 1960, he played murder victim Judson Bailey in "The Case of the Loquacious Liar," and finally in 1964, he played Mr. Winlock in "The Case of the Blonde Bonanza".

Also in 1959, he made three other appearances: the Gene Barry TV western Bat Masterson, playing Bat's nemesis "Jason Medford", who tries to pin a murder rap on the star who is interrupting his protection money racketeering success in the town of St. Joseph, Missouri; an episode of Whirlybirds as an escaped convict who kidnaps his dying wife from her hospital bed; and alongside Pernell Roberts, he also starred as Capt. Emil Tremaine in an episode of ABC's One Step Beyond entitled The Vision.

Gordon appeared twice in 1961 on ABC's Adventures in Paradise, starring Gardner McKay; he was cast as Stevens in "Mr. Flotsam" and as Red Munce in "Adam San". He also appeared as politician Rath Lawson in the episode "The Ice Man", for the western show Maverick.

His subsequent frequent, energetic performances as Capone-era mobster Frank "The Enforcer" Nitti in Desilu Productions' The Untouchables (1959–1963) led to his being typecast as an often darkly humorous 'heavy' for the rest of his career. Often stealing scenes from the stolid, humorless Eliot Ness, as portrayed by Robert Stack, his famous catch-phrases in The Untouchables were "Ya got nothin' on me, Ness. I'm clean!" and (directed at the victims of Nitti's wrath) "You're dead!"

In 1964, Gordon guest-starred in the episode "Between the Rats and the Finks" of CBS's drama series, Mr. Broadway, starring Craig Stevens, with fellow guest stars Larry Hagman and Dyan Cannon.

From 1965 to 1968, Gordon appeared in several episodes of the long-running prime-time soap opera Peyton Place alongside actress Lee Grant as Gus Chernak, the alcoholic and vengeful father of Grant's character Stella Chernak. In 1966, Gordon costarred with trumpet player Jack Sheldon in the 16-segment CBS sitcom, Run, Buddy, Run, about the fictitious Buddy Overstreet who is on the run from the mob after "Buddy" overhears "Mr. D", played by Gordon, plotting the murder of a fellow gangster. In 1966, he and Robert Stack appeared together in an episode of The Lucy Show spoofing their roles from The Untouchables. In 1968, he played the security man in the "Sour Note" episode of It Takes a Thief, starring Robert Wagner, and also appeared, in early 1969, in the Here's Lucy episode "Lucy and the Ex-Con" with Wally Cox. In December 1972, he played a over zealous detective on Adam-12.

== Film ==
His film credits included roles in The Buccaneer (1958), Curse of the Undead (1959), Key Witness (1960), Roger Corman's Tower of London (1962), Hello Down There (1969) and Timerider: The Adventure of Lyle Swann (1982). He also worked with Corman again, playing the nasty Colonel Waxman in the cult classic Piranha (1978), starring alongside Bradford Dillman and Kevin McCarthy.

== Later years ==
Gordon retired from acting after playing himself in the 1989 film Ernest Goes to Splash Mountain, though he was the executive producer of the Australian telefilm Feds: the Betrayal (1996) and producer of the US/Chinese fantasy martial arts film Warriors of Virtue: the Return to Tao in 2002. For a time, he operated a dinner-and-show restaurant in Scottsdale, Arizona, called "Frank Nitti's Place", and in the early 1980s, a pizza restaurant of the same name in Kansas City, Missouri. He greeted patrons at the door in his typical pin stripe suit with a carnation in the lapel.

In 2003, he was reportedly unable to attend the funeral of Untouchables co-star Robert Stack because of poor health. Eight years later, Gordon died after a lengthy illness; he was two weeks shy of his 95th birthday. At the time of his death, Gordon lived in Santa Fe, New Mexico, with his wife Marla.

== Filmography ==
Year	Title	Role	Notes
1948	The Naked City	Cop at Williamsburg Bridge	Uncredited
1948	The Street with No Name	Detective in Raid	Uncredited
1949	Love Happy	Hannibal Zoto	
1958	The Buccaneer	Gramby	
1959	Curse of the Undead	Buffer	
1960	Mission of Danger	Capt. Hugo Martin	Three Northwest Passage TV episodes combined
1960	Key Witness	Arthur Robbins	
1962	Rider on a Dead Horse	Barney Senn	
1962	Tower of London	Earl of Buckingham	
1968	Slow Run		
1969	Hello Down There	Adm. Sheridan	
1971	Machismo: 40 Graves for 40 Guns	Burt	
1978	Piranha	Colonel Waxman	
1982	Timerider: The Adventure of Lyle Swann	Earl	
