= Betty Anderson =

Fictional character in the American 1956 novel Peyton Place

- Peyton Place character
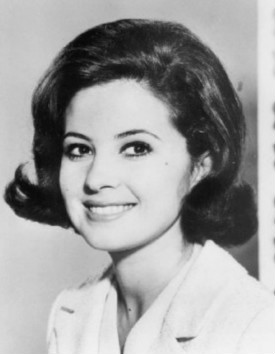
- Portrayed by: Barbara Parkins
- First appearance: September 15, 1964 (#1)
- Last appearance: May 19, 1969 (#512)
- Created by: Grace Metalious
In-universe information
- Occupation: Motorcycle shop co-worker Personal assistant Nurse
- Family: Leslie Harrington (father-in-law); Catherine Harrington (mother-in-law) (deceased); Martin Peyton (grandfather-in-law) (deceased); Norman Harrington (brother-in-law)
- Parents: Julie Anderson (mother); George Anderson (father)
- Aunts and uncles: Lois (aunt)
- First cousins: Tommy (cousin)

Betty Anderson is a fictional character in the novel Peyton Place, written by Grace Metalious, as well as the subsequent films and TV series based on the novel.

Terry Moore portrayed Betty in the 1957 film. The character was played by Barbara Parkins in the 1960s TV series, and in the short-lived 1970s daytime soap opera Return to Peyton Place, she was played by Julie Parrish, and later Lynn Loring. In a later TV movie, Murder in Peyton Place, Janet Margolin performed the role of Betty.

== Peyton Place ==
=== Novel ===
Betty is the daughter of millworker John and Berit Anderson, and lived in the small community of Peyton Place. She is known for her less than moral behavior, and used her sexuality for power over men. In the book, she was described as "having not only the morals but the claws of an alley cat". She had a crush on Rodney Harrington, the son of mill owner, Leslie Harrington. Betty and Rodney had gone on a drive to a nearby lake, and then it was discovered that she was pregnant; some time later, Rodney had died in a car accident. She eventually had a son named Roddy, whom she adored.

For some time, (in the second book, Return to Peyton Place) she lived in New York, where she worked as a waitress; then after Roddy was born, she returned to Peyton Place, with a former neighbor in New York, Agnes Carlisle, who often watched Roddy. The family eventually moved to a house on Laurel Street, and they lived as well as they could.

For a planned but never written third book of Peyton Place, author Grace Metalious considered depicting Betty as the mother of Rodney, Jr., as well as her relationship with her father-in-law. Furthermore, she was supposed to fall in love with a Swede named Karl Gustafson.

=== Film ===
There were only a few differences from Betty's portrayal in the 1956 novel and the 1957 film. In the film, set in the early 1940s, she is the school's most popular girl who is involved with Rodney. Quiet girl Allison MacKenzie looks up to her, but at the same time falls in love with her boyfriend Rodney. She is invited to Allison's birthday party, where she pours alcohol in the drinks, dims all the lights, and starts heavily making out with Rodney. This enrages Allison's mother Constance, who disapproves of Betty and sends her away.

Sometime later, Betty's father starts to demand that she marry Rodney. Rodney's wealthy father Leslie, though, disapproves of Betty because of her middle-class background, and pressures Rodney into taking someone else to the school prom; Allison. At the prom, Rodney dumps Allison to make out with Betty in her car. Just as they are about to have sex, Betty dumps him for not having asked her to the prom. During the summer, Rodney convinces her to give him another chance, and they go skinny dipping at a nearby lake, where they are spotted by a local gossip. Soon after, they elope, which greatly upsets Rodney's family. He leaves Betty behind to join the army, and after a while, she receives notice that he has died. This devastating news allows Betty to make peace with Rodney's father, who until then had never spoken a positive word about her.

=== Soap ===
==== Season 1 ====
In the TV series, Betty was more prominent. She was the daughter of Julie Anderson and George Anderson. Growing up, Betty dealt with the unstable marriage of her parents; her father was an abusive alcoholic. She was in love with Rodney Harrington, who was her boyfriend from an upper-class family that disapproved of her. Life seemed to be fortunate, although she felt the competition between her and Allison MacKenzie, whom Rodney also felt attracted to. Their relationship is furthermore endangered by her mother Julie's affair with Rodney's father Leslie Harrington, which Rodney found difficult to deal with, as did Betty, who despised her mother when finding out. After they had already broken up, Betty found out through Michael Rossi that she was pregnant of Rodney. Instead of coming clean in hope for support, Betty refused to confide this in anyone but Michael and her mother. She was afraid to tell Rodney about her pregnancy, because she feared that he would think that she would be trapping him into a relationship.

Soon after, she told Rodney the truth about her pregnancy, and Rodney, shocked, accidentally caused a car accident, during which Betty suffered a miscarriage. Fearing to lose Rodney, she pretended she was still pregnant to trick him into marrying her. They rushed into a marriage, which angered both the Harrington and Anderson family. Betty felt guilty about lying to Rodney about her fake pregnancy, but George assured her that she was doing it for the best. She is taken into the Harrington house, where she has trouble to become accepted by the family. Leslie asked Dr. Robert Morton to check up on her, and he found out about the miscarriage. He confronted Betty with this, which pressured her into telling the truth to Rodney. They got into a major fight, which led Betty to wanting to leave town for Boston. Instead, she stayed to save her marriage, despite Leslie's attempts to convince Rodney to divorce her. It did not work, though, and after she realized that they were no longer in love with each other, she left town for New York without informing anyone.

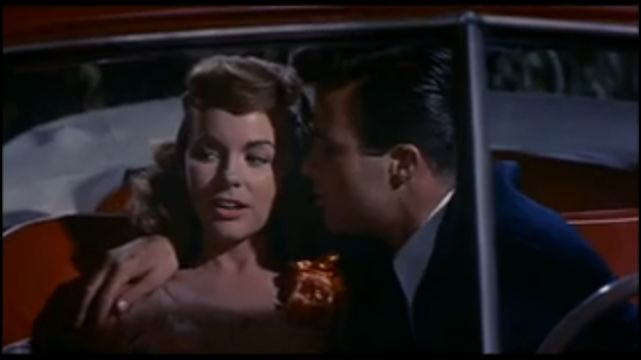
Terry Moore (left) as Betty Anderson

Meanwhile, her parents broke up, for which Betty blamed her mother. In New York, she befriended Sharon Purcell, a wild party girl with a scandalous past. Sharon pressured Betty into going out with a married man, Roy Roberts. Betty was reluctant to do so, and freaked out when he forced himself upon her. After she was informed that her father was taken into a sanatorium, Betty returned to Peyton Place and granted Rodney an annulment on condition that Leslie paid George's medical bills. Drama quickly continued as Betty found out that Leslie had hired a private investigator to spy on her in New York. The contents of the report was a major story throughout the entire show, with conflicts of its reliability as the main issue.

To progress the annulment, Betty was allowed a job as a nurse's aide at the Peyton Place hospital, though she immediately got into conflict with head nurse Choate. Miss Choate felt that Betty was not fit as a nurse's aide due to her personal problems, but Betty was hired nevertheless, and Choate's attempts to scare her away proved unsuccessful. Meanwhile, her father returned home from the sanitarium, but Betty's delight was short lived, because George turned out to have lost his mind and - after an almost fatal confrontation with Martin Peyton and shoot-out with Elliot Carson - he was sent away forever. Despite her father's crime, she believed that he was manipulated by someone and blamed school teacher Paul Hanley. Some stability came back in her life when she met Reverend Jerry Bedford, with whom she became romantically involved. Almost simultaneously, she fell in love with lawyer Steven Cord. Even though Julie wanted her daughter to go out with Jerry, Betty eventually choose Steven to date.

==== Season 2 ====
Quickly, Steven grew jealous of Betty's connection to Rodney. The latter called Betty at the hospital when he accidentally killed Joe Chernak, creating a bond between the two while he went on trial. Steven grew suspicious of an affair, as Betty fought hard to prove Rodney's innocence, which led in turn to a great conflict with Joe's sister Stella Chernak (when Michael started dating Stella, Betty made sure that he knew about her thoughts of Stella). She even broke into hospital paper files to find any sort of information which could help Rodney, though she was caught by Miss Choate and got fired. Hereafter, she spent her time getting to meet Steven's mother Hannah Cord and Martin Peyton. Peyton immediately liked Betty for her outspokenness and was thankful to her for her attempts to help his grandson Rodney. Betty accepted his job offer as his personal assistant, thereby endangering Hannah's position as his maid. Hannah immediately disliked Betty because of this, and they never made up.

Meanwhile, Rodney's trial was still ongoing and Betty was called to testify, because Sgt. Goddard found out that she accompanied Rodney on the night of Joe's death. Betty twisted the truth, which upset Steven, though Rodney was grateful to her and kissed her. Steven, now serving as Rodney's lawyer, suspicions of an affair grew and he threatened to lose the case deliberately if Betty did not stop seeing Rodney. She realized that she was still in love with Rodney, and when he was found guilty of murder due to a false statement by Stella, she made sure that Stella would spoke out the truth. Betty told her mother that she did not carry any romantic feelings for Steven, accepted a marriage proposal nevertheless because she was encouraged to do so by Rodney. After the marriage, they moved into a new house acquired by Hannah.

After a moment of happiness, a new woman in town, Ann Howard, led to a major conflict between Steven and Peyton, and Betty was used as a spy for Steven. Through Rodney, Betty found out that Steven and Ann were related before they knew themselves, and she decided to keep silent. Meanwhile, she grew jealous of Sandy Webber, a new girl in town who constantly flirted with Rodney. Steven caught head of her jealousy and confronted Betty with her vulgarity to scare Sandy away. Hannah encouraged Steven's suspicions, because it kept him from finding out about the truth regarding Ann. Seeing her marriage being torn apart by this secret, Betty wanted to come clean with Steven, but Peyton and Hannah forced her to stay silent. She eventually grew fed up with Steven's accusations of unfaithfulness, and she left him. When Steven filed for divorce, Betty did not fight to save her marriage, feeling that it is a punishment for not having loved him. Though when Steven found out about Ann, he returned to Betty and they were able to save their marriage.

Later on, she remarried Rodney, though the love triangle never disappeared.

== Return to Peyton Place ==
The character Betty appeared in Return to Peyton Place, the follow-up novel to Peyton Place, but not in its 1961 film adaptation. However, she did appear in the daytime soap opera which aired from 1972 to 1974. In this version, she was married to Rodney Harrington, but they soon estranged from each other. Rodney fell in love with Allison MacKenzie, while Betty started an affair with Steven Cord. She was aware that Martin Peyton was still alive, and agreed on keeping it a secret from the other townspeople.

In this soap opera, Betty was the mother of Steven's son Peyton, but, in mid-1973, she refused to let him see him. In late 1973, Betty and Steven planned on marrying each other, but their relationship was constantly put on the test by D. B. Bentley, a wealthy heiress who seduced Steven for business information. Betty gave Steven an ultimatum: choose between her and D. B. Steven initially followed D. B.'s advice not to rush into a wedding with Betty, but he later regrets the decision.

The series ends with Betty, now divorced from Rodney, planning on marrying Steven in the Caribbean. When Martin Peyton finds out about this, he announces he will return to town to prevent this from happening. The soap opera was cancelled before this plot was finished, leaving it unknown to the viewer whether Betty and Steven married.

== TV movies ==
=== Murder in Peyton Place ===
In the first TV movie, Murder in Peyton Place (1977), Betty was married to a man named David Roerick, with whom she lived in another city. She was unfaithful to her husband, secretly arranging a meeting with Rodney in Peyton Place. She was supposed to meet Rodney near the town, and witnessed the car he was driving getting into a crash and explosion. Panicked, she called the police, but did not give her identity. Back in Peyton Place, she moved in with her friend Denise Haley. Denise's husband Stan was suspicious of Betty, and felt that she was keeping secrets. Constance MacKenzie was not glad with her arrival in town, and feared that she was going to seduce Rodney, who by then was in a relationship with her daughter Allison MacKenzie.

When it turned out that Rodney and Allison died in the car crash, Betty extended her stay in Peyton Place, which worried her husband David. Along with a group of old friends, including Norman Harrington and Steven Cord, Betty suspected that the couple was murdered. They started their own investigation, during which Betty spent a lot of time with Steven. This worried his wife Carla, who suspected that Steven was having an affair with Betty. Betty's investigation was cut short when David asked her to move back in with him, after which she left town.

=== Peyton Place: The Next Generation ===
During the second reunion movie, Peyton Place: The Next Generation (1985), Betty was engaged to a man named Dorian Blake, and had a teenage son, Dana, from her marriage with Rodney Harrington. Together with Dorian, she lived in the mansion once owned by Martin Peyton, which she inherited through her son's family connection to Peyton, Dana's great grandfather. A condition of owning the mansion was coping with Peyton's faithful housekeeper Hannah Cord, who Betty greatly disliked. She is now fully occupied with raising her rebellious son, who to her regret, has issues with Dorian.

During a visit to Dr. Michael Rossi, it is revealed that Dana was conceived through a one-night stand with Steven during her marriage to Rodney. She had kept the identity of Dana's father a secret to assure her son of one day inheriting Peyton's estate, which would not happen if it turned out that Dana was not related to Peyton. Michael pressures her to tell this to Dana and Steven, but Betty is too afraid.

One evening, she overhears Dorian calling to the hospital to find out more about Megan MacKenzie, a young woman who was hit by a car earlier that evening. Dorian admits that he hit Megan and also raped Allison - who was recently strangled to death - twenty years earlier. Scared, Betty tries to get away, and runs into the woods near the mansion. Dorian follows her, and although she tries to escape, she is caught. Dorian attempts to push her off a cliff, but she is saved by Steven, who fights with Dorian before pushing him off the same cliff, which kills him instantly.

After having processed the shock, Betty reveals to Steven and Dana that they are father and son. Steven is initially angry at Betty for having lied about this, but later forgives her, as does Dana.

== Production ==
In February 1957, it was announced actress Terry Moore was campaigning for the role in the first film adaptation. She was cast a month later. In the TV series, the character was supposed to be killed during a car accident in the 11th episode. However, the character's portrayer, Barbara Parkins, proved to be so successful, that she stayed on the show for its entire run. In a late 1965 interview, the actress said about her role:

"I'm lucky in the role I have. Mine was the big story when the series started off. I haven't had much to do lately, but when I do have scenes, they are important to the plot, You might say I'm the salt and pepper in the stew."

Parkins was the only female star to remain with the series through its entire run (1964–1969). In 1966, she was nominated for an Emmy Award as Best Actress in a Lead Role in a Dramatic Series, but lost to Barbara Stanwyck for The Big Valley. About losing the award, on her 22nd birthday, Parkins told the press:

"I was hurt, but if I had to lose I was glad it was to Barbara Stanwyck, who is a grand lady and fine actress. I would have hated to lose to Anne Francis. I don't care much for her work. A woman should be feminine and not go around hitting people with judo chops the way she does in that Honey West show."

Eventually shedding her "other side of the tracks" image, Betty endured many of the trials and tribulations of soap opera life. The character achieved such popularity that when the show ended its run, producer Paul Monash developed a spin-off series, The Girl from Peyton Place, for Parkins. However, when co-star Ryan O'Neal, who played her husband, declined to participate, the project was shelved. Nevertheless, Parkins insisted she often felt very insecure on the set, saying

"Sometimes I think I hold myself in too tightly. I would watch Lee Grant do those wild things when she played Stella Chernak and think I should try something like that, but when I did I was pathetic. I'm very critical of what I see of myself, but I did get an Emmy nomination, didn't I?."

In the first reunion film, Parkins was approached to reprise her role, but she declined. Janet Margolin was assigned as her replacement.

== Portrayers ==
- Peyton Place (film) (1957) - Terry Moore
- Peyton Place (TV series) (1964–1969) - Barbara Parkins
- Return to Peyton Place (TV series) (1972–1974) - Julie Parrish (1972–1973) and Lynn Loring (1973–1974)
- Murder in Peyton Place (1977) - Janet Margolin
- Peyton Place: The Next Generation (1985) - Barbara Parkins
