= The Eavesdropper =

- Directed by: Leopoldo Torre Nilsson
- Written by: Beatriz Guido
- Produced by: Paul Heller
- Starring: Stathis Giallelis; Janet Margolin
- Cinematography: Alberto Etchebehere
- Edited by: Jacinto Cascales
- Music by: Ruben López Furst
- Distributed by: Royal Films International
- Release dates: March 1966 (Mar del Plata); 1 September 1966 (Buenos Aires)
- Running time: 102 minute
- Countries: Argentina; United States
- Languages: Spanish; English

The Eavesdropper (Spanish: El ojo que espía), also known as El ojo de la cerradura, is a 1966 film directed by Argentine filmmaker Leopoldo Torre Nilsson. It was financed with the U.S. company Columbia Pictures.

== Cast ==
- Stathis Giallelis as Martin Casals
- Janet Margolin as Inés
- Lautaro Murúa as Hernán Ramallo
- Leonardo Favio as Santos
- Nelly Meden as Lola
- Ignacio de Soroa as Ramón Casal
- Elena Cortesina as Mariquita

== Release ==
The film screened at the 9th Mar del Plata International Film Festival, which was held from 2 to 12 March 1966. The film premiered in Buenos Aires on 1 September 1966. It was released in two versions: an English-language version at Cine Iguazú and a Spanish-language version at other cinemas. The film made its U.S. debut under the title The Eavesdropper at the New York Film Festival on 14 September 1966.

== Reception ==
The film was received well at international film festivals.

== Awards ==
The film won the 1967 Silver Condor Award for Best Director.
