= Henry Beckman =

Canadian actor

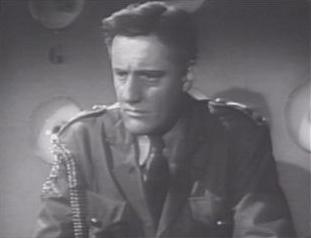
- Henry Beckman as Commander Paul Richards in Flash Gordon
- Born: 26 November 1921; Halifax, Nova Scotia, Canada
- Died: 17 June 2008 (aged 86); Barcelona, Spain
- Occupation: Actor
- Years active: 1951–2002
- Spouse(s): Cheryl Maxwell (1955-98; her death); Hillary Beckman (2001-08; his death)

Henry Beckman (26 November 1921 – 17 June 2008) was a Canadian stage, film and television actor.

== Career ==
Beckman appeared in well over 100 productions in the United States and Canada, including recurring roles as Commander Paul Richards in the 1954 Flash Gordon space opera television series, Bob Mulligan in the ABC sitcom I'm Dickens, He's Fenster, George Anderson in the television adaptation of Peyton Place, Captain Clancey in the Western comedy-drama Here Come the Brides, Harry Mark on Bronk, conniving United States Army Colonel Douglas Harrigan in McHale's Navy, Colonel Platt in the 1965 movie McHale's Navy Joins the Air Force, and as a sheriff in an episode of Rango.

He made four guest appearances on the CBS courtroom drama series Perry Mason, including the role of David in the 1960 episode "The Case of the Flighty Father", as Sydney L. Garth in the 1962 episode "The Case of the Captain's Coins", as Albert King in the 1965 episode "The Case of the Wrongful Writ" and as William March in the 1966 episode "The Case of the Dead Ringer". He made a guest appearance as Cody on Honey West "A Matter of Wife and Death" (episode 4) in 1965.

In the 1980s he appeared in Kane & Abel, played the security guard Alf on the Don Adams sitcom Check It Out!, and was also a non-celebrity contestant on the TV game show Scrabble. He continued to act through his late seventies on shows like The Commish and MacGyver, and a handful of appearances on The X-Files, most notably with "Squeeze".

== Awards/legacy ==
Beckman won two Canadian Film Awards for Best Supporting Actor, in 1975 for Why Rock the Boat? and in 1978 for Blood and Guts. With his first wife, actress Cheryl Maxwell, Beckman founded the Dukes Oak Theater in Cooperstown, New York, and served as the theater company's producer.

== War service ==
He served with the Canadian Army during World War II, including the D-Day Landings at Juno Beach, Normandy, on 6 June 1944.

== Family ==
He is the father of astrophysicist and software engineer Brian Beckman.

== Death ==
Beckman died in Barcelona, Spain on 17 June 2008 with his second wife Hillary at his side.

== Selected filmography ==
| Year | Title | Role | Notes |
|---|---|---|---|
| 1953 | Niagara | Motorcycle Cop (uncredited) | |
| 1953 | The Glory Brigade | Soldier (uncredited) | |
| 1956 | The Wrong Man | Prisoner at Arraignment Hearing (uncredited) | |
| 1957 | So Lovely... So Deadly | Steve Clark | |
| 1960 | The Bramble Bush | Bill Watts (uncredited) | |
| 1961 | Breakfast at Tiffany's | Narcotics Detective Cronberger (uncredited) | |
| 1962 | 13 West Street | Joe Bradford | |
| 1963 | The Man from the Diners' Club | Policeman (uncredited) | |
| 1963 | Twilight of Honor | Man Stirring Up Crowd (uncredited) | |
| 1964 | Dead Ringer | Prosecutor (uncredited) | |
| 1964 | Marnie | First Detective | |
| 1964 | A House Is Not a Home | Croupier (uncredited) | |
| 1964 | Kiss Me, Stupid | Truck Driver | |
| 1965 | The Satan Bug | Dr. Baxter | |
| 1965 | The Glory Guys | Salesman | |
| 1965 | McHale's Navy Joins the Air Force | Col. Platt | |
| 1967 | The Caper of the Golden Bulls | Bendell | |
| 1968 | Madigan | Philip Downes | |
| 1968 | The Stalking Moon | Sgt. Rudabaugh | |
| 1969 | Sweet Charity | Policeman (uncredited) | |
| 1969 | The Undefeated | Thad Benedict | |
| 1972 | The Merry Wives of Tobias Rouke | Tobias Rouke | |
| 1973 | Between Friends | Will | |
| 1974 | Peopletoys | Dr. Brown | |
| 1974 | Why Rock the Boat? | Philip Butcher | |
| 1976 | Silver Streak | Conventioneer | |
| 1978 | Blood and Guts | Red Henkel | |
| 1979 | The Brood | Barton Kelly | |
| 1981 | Death Hunt | Bill Luce | |
| 1986 | Every Dog's Guide to Complete Home Safety | The Boss | |
| 1990 | I Love You to Death | Wendel Carter | |
| 2000 | Epicenter | Pat | |
| 2000 | Lion of Oz | Narrator (voice) | |

== Television ==
| Year | Title | Role | Notes |
|---|---|---|---|
| 1959 | Police Station | Detective Stan Abramson | 2 episodes: s01:e01 and S1:E04 |
| 1962 | Gunsmoke | Duff | 1 episode: s08:e03 "Quint Asper Comes Home" |
| 1965 | The Munsters | “Leadfoot“ Baylor / Ralph, the Husband | 2 episodes: s01:e36 "Hot Rod Herman", s2:e05 "Herman, Coach of the Year" |
| 1967 | The Monkees | D.A. / Manager | 2 episodes: s02:e02 "The Picture Frame", s2e19 "The Monkee's Paw" |
| 1968-1970 | Here Come the Brides | Captain Clancey | Recurring (Season 1) Main Cast (Season 2) |
| 1985 | Check it Out! | Alf Scully | Season 1 |
| 1988 | Family Reunion | Leo | Television film |
