= Ten Blocks on the Camino Real =

- NET Playhouse episode
- Episode no.: Season 1 Episode 1
- Directed by: Jack Landau
- Written by: Tennessee Williams
- Based on: one act play by Tennessee Williams
- Original air date: October 7, 1966
- Running time: 80 mins

Episode chronology
← Previous —	Next → "The Journey of the Fifth Horse"

Ten Blocks on the Camino Real is a 1966 American television film based on a 1946 one-act play by Tennessee Williams of the same name. This play later formed the basis of his play Camino Real.

Jack Landau directed for NET Playhouse.

== Cast ==
- Martin Sheen as Kilroy
- Lotte Lenya
- Tom Aldredge
- Michael Baseleon
- Albert Dekker
- Hurd Hatfield
- Kazimir Kokich
- Janet Margolin
- Patricia Neway
- Carrie Nye
- Jackie Washington
