= Peyton Place (TV series) =

American prime-time soap opera

- Original title card (1964–1966)
- Genre: Soap opera
- Based on: Peyton Place by Grace Metalious
- Developed by: Paul Monash
- Starring: (in premiere episode); Dorothy Malone; Warner Anderson; Ed Nelson; Mia Farrow; Ryan O'Neal; Barbara Parkins and (over the run of the series) a cast of over 200 actors in primary and secondary roles
- Theme music composer: Franz Waxman
- Opening theme: "Theme from Peyton Place"
- Country of origin: United States
- Original language: English
- No. of seasons: 5
- No. of episodes: 514

Production
- Executive producer: Paul Monash
- Producers: Everett Chambers; Richard Goldstone
- Camera setup: Single-camera
- Running time: 22–24 minutes
- Production company: 20th Century-Fox Television

Original release
- Network: ABC
- Release: September 15, 1964 – June 2, 1969

Related
- Return to Peyton Place (film); Return to Peyton Place (TV series)

Peyton Place is an American prime-time soap opera that aired on ABC in half-hour episodes from September 15, 1964, to June 2, 1969.

Loosely based upon the 1956 novel of the same name by Grace Metalious, the series was preceded by a 1957 film adaptation. A total of 514 episodes were broadcast, in black-and-white from 1964 to 1966 and in color from 1966 to 1969. The first color episode is episode #268. At the show's peak, ABC ran three new episodes a week. The program was produced by 20th Century Fox Television. A number of guest stars appeared in the series for extended periods, among them Dan Duryea, Susan Oliver, Leslie Nielsen, Gena Rowlands, and Lee Grant (who won a Primetime Emmy Award for Outstanding Performance by an Actress in a Supporting Role in a Drama for her role of tough-as-nails Stella Chernak). The series served as the springboard for such performers as Mia Farrow, Ryan O'Neal, Barbara Parkins, Christopher Connelly, David Canary, Mariette Hartley, and Lana Wood. Initially it was sponsored by Bristol Myers and Brown & Williamson.

== History ==
With Peyton Place, ABC hoped to bring the success of the British serial Coronation Street to America. Inspired by that serial, it was decided that it should be aired in prime time. Another influence was CBS head James T. Aubrey's great success with salacious programs. Producer Paul Monash wanted to launch a revival of Grace Metalious' novel of the same name. He refused to acknowledge it as a soap opera, calling it a 'high-class anthology drama'. An hour-long pilot was shot in 1962. Originally, the Cross family from the novel was included, but when Irna Phillips was contracted to change the pilot, she decided to scrap it. Various disagreements between the makers ensued, and the official pilot was not aired until September 15, 1964.

When the series premiered in late 1964, it marked the birth of the prime time American soap opera. The early stories were adapted from the 1956 book and 1957 film of the same name, although some principal character names, backstories and occupations were changed or simply eliminated. The time setting was changed from the early 1940s (of the novel and film) to the present day, and the town's location, which had previously been unidentified, was established as being in the commonwealth of Massachusetts in the fourth episode. Some sensational plot lines from the novel (like incest) were replaced with less controversial themes (like teen pregnancy). The series, nevertheless, immediately was criticized for the sexual themes with which it dealt.

Peyton Place was an instant hit; especially in the early years, when it had a loyal following from fans around the world. Originally, it was aired twice a week, but because of its success, it was increased to three airings a week in June 1965. When Dorothy Malone was rushed into emergency surgery, the producers were faced with the dilemma of what to do with her character, Constance MacKenzie, who at that point was too deeply embroiled in the plot line to disappear without reason. Lola Albright was hired to take over the role and continued in the series until Malone returned.

The show's downfall began in September 1966. Ratings dropped after Mia Farrow's departure. Farrow never expected the show to become a success and immediately tried to get out of her contract when the show started its airing. On the urging of her then-husband Frank Sinatra, the producers decided to write her off the show in the summer of 1966. The character Rachel Welles, portrayed by Leigh Taylor-Young, was written into the show as her replacement. The addition of Taylor-Young's character, however, was not successful in increasing the ratings. The show was cut back to two airings a week. By 1968, most of the original characters had been written out of the show, in many cases at their own request. Critics agreed the show had become 'dated' and, because of the constant change in characters, confusing as well. The writers, already beginning work on what would be the final season, announced several new characters would be written into the show. They would deal with 'electrifying subjects, the war, the draft, riots, music, God, and godlessness'. Although several well-known actors were added to the cast, including Ruby Dee, it was cancelled on June 2, 1969.

=== Major changes between the 1956 novel and the series ===
- The book is set in the years surrounding World War II. The series was set in the decade it was produced.
- The entire Cross family, an important family in the novel, does not appear in the television series.
- In the novel, Michael Kyros was a high school teacher and the school principal. In the television series, he becomes Michael Rossi (as indeed he does in the novel Return to Peyton Place) and serves as the town's doctor.
- In the novel, Matthew Swain was the town's doctor. In the television series, he serves as the editor of the local newspaper.
- In the novel Rodney Harrington and Norman Page are unrelated. In the television series, they are brothers, sons of Leslie Harrington.
- In the novel, Betty Anderson is more bad-natured than in the television series.
- In the novel, Constance runs a clothing store; in the television series, she operates a bookstore.

== Plots ==
The series opens with a shot of a church's steeple, and the words "Peyton Place" superimposed, with a tolling of church bells. Announcer Dick Tufeld announces "This is the continuing story of Peyton Place." The scene changes to scenes of the town square, a rolling brook, and a panoramic view of Peyton Place. It dissolves to cast members, the sponsor tag, and then narration of previous episode events by Warner Anderson, who also played Matthew Swain. In 1966 the message was changed to "In color, the continuing story of Peyton Place." Warner Anderson left the series after the first season, but continued as narrator to the series until the final episode.

=== Season 1 (1964–1965) ===
In the first episode, Dr. Michael Rossi (Ed Nelson) arrives from New York City to set up practice in town. Newspaper editor Matthew Swain (Warner Anderson) tells him people usually try to get away from towns like Peyton Place, not move to them. Matthew's third cousin Allison MacKenzie (Mia Farrow), a close friend of classmate Norman Harrington (Christopher Connelly), has begun to fall in love with his older brother, Rodney (Ryan O'Neal); she is smitten as soon as they share their first kiss. At the end of the episode, Allison's mother, Constance (Dorothy Malone), makes it clear she disapproves of her daughter's newfound relationship with Rodney.

Rodney is startled to find his father, Leslie (Paul Langton), in a passionate embrace with his secretary, Julie Anderson (Kasey Rogers), the mother of Rodney's girlfriend, Betty (Barbara Parkins). Both Leslie and Julie are in unhappy marriages, but Leslie can't explain this to his son in the moment. Confused, Rodney tells Betty he cannot date her anymore and begins to see Allison instead. Betty, confused and hurt because he offered no reason for breaking up with her, discovers she is pregnant and tells Rodney. He agrees to marry her, and then, following a car accident, Betty miscarries their child, but she does not tell Rodney until after they are wed—though Dr. Rossi, his nurse Laura, and Betty's parents knew the truth before the marriage. Dr. Rossi and Constance become closer, though she's unnerved by his possible purchase of the Carson beachfront home because of Elizabeth Carson's murder there.

Dr. Rossi also tangles with Dr. Morton (Kent Smith) over emergency surgery for Catherine Peyton Harrington (Mary Anderson), Rodney and Norman's spoiled, sickly, manipulative mother, who suffers a potentially fatal perforated ulcer. Rossi can't save Catherine's life especially when Morton arrives and tries to obstruct him from performing emergency surgery. Betty decides to leave Peyton Place but runs into Allison at the bus depot and changes her mind about leaving. Morton threatens to destroy Rossi over Catherine's death and uses the autopsy process to frame him out of his admitting and operating privileges—until Rossi discovers the pathologist, Dr. Bradford, made a critical error. Allison confesses to her mother that she still loves Rodney, and Betty confesses to Rodney that she miscarried in the auto accident, but after rejecting the idea at first both she and Rodney agree to annul the marriage. Catherine's will includes a surprise codicil returning Leslie's stock in the mill to her father. Pressured by Rossi's relentless effort to clear himself, Bradford confesses he faked Catherine's autopsy report to Morton, who informs Leslie of the truth. Learning of this, Rossi urges Morton not to leave Peyton Place or Doctor's Hospital. Betty shows an interest in nursing and Rossi helps her find a job as a nurse's aide at the hospital to begin. Betty's disturbed father, George Anderson (Henry Beckman), whose frustrations and drinking have driven him to spousal abuse and finally a nervous breakdown, is hospitalized in a sanitarium.

Midway through the first season, another principal character arrives in Peyton Place. Elliot Carson (Tim O'Connor), Allison's birth father, who had been imprisoned for 18 years after being convicted of murdering his wife, Elizabeth, though the actual culprit was Catherine Harrington. The truth about the crime begins to emerge after Elliot's former brother-in-law Paul Hanley, now a college teacher whose students include Allison—and who originally testified against Elliot at the murder trial—discovers Elizabeth's diary and gives it to Elliot. Elliot is also torn between wanting Allison to know he's her real father and, at Constance's urging, not wanting to hurt her with the knowledge. George Anderson is allowed his first home visit during his treatment period. Elliot tries to stop George shooting Leslie and is shot himself; Leslie vows to clear Elliot's name after Elliot undergoes surgery—out of guilt, having hidden the truth about Elizabeth's murder. After Leslie tells the Peyton family attorney (Patrick Whyte) that Catherine committed the murder, the reaction makes him realize that most people will believe that Leslie is the real murderer who is dragging his dead wife's name through the mud, a suspicion that rears its head throughout the run of the show, especially when Catherine's father, the show title town's patriarch, becomes a dominant regular character long after initial references to him as a dying invalid. Elizabeth Carson's affair and murder have been noted by scholars for setting up the town's legacy of transgressive women. Meanwhile, no longer in charge of the Peyton Mill and disillusioned over his alienation from his sons now that they know who killed Elizabeth, Leslie leaves Peyton Place to travel abroad and sort out his life, while Norman struggles to accept the truth about his mother who doted on him.

With his name clear, Elliot eventually marries Constance, but their decision to reveal to Allison that he is her real father, and that her mother hid that fact from her to protect her from association with a convicted murderer, does not go over too well with a daughter who had a firmly established view of the fictionalized father she had been brought up to believe in. Meanwhile, Norman falls in love with working-class girl Rita Jacks (Patricia Morrow), whose mother, Ada (Evelyn Scott), owns the local tavern. They start a relationship, but both are constantly bothered by Rita's aggressive ex-boyfriend Joe Chernak (Don Quine). Steven Cord (James Douglas) arrives in Peyton Place to work with the Peyton/Harrington attorney but slowly reveals an agenda of his own. Claire Morton (Mariette Hartley), the daughter of Dr. Morton and a successful physician in her own right, returns to Peyton Place to end her marriage to a successful but indifferent doctor (Leslie Nielsen) and shows more than a professional interest in Dr. Rossi. Norman and Rita's graduation night is spoiled when Joe tries to assault Rita, who tries to keep it secret. Otherwise, while serving as a co-chaperone, Constance tells Rodney she's changed her mind about him. Elliot is offered the editorship of the Peyton Place Clarion after Matt decides to retire and leave Peyton Place.

Rodney tries to defend Norman, promising to help Rita and get Joe to back off, and winds up in a fight with him on the wharf, during which Joe accidentally falls off the wharf, strikes his head and, after getting up and trying to come at Rodney again, drops forward and dies. All of this is witnessed by Kim Schuster (Kimberly Beck), the six-year-old deaf-mute daughter of David (William Smithers) and Doris (Gail Kobe). She did not want to move from New York City to Peyton Place and, as a result, starts to rebel against her mother. She only bonds with Allison, who serves as her babysitter. The Schusters' marriage is troubled as a result of Kim's rebellion and David's ambivalence about operating the Peyton Mill. Doris eventually discharges Allison and tries to bond with Kim belatedly, but the troubles between the Schusters only deepen—especially when they learn Kim ran off while Allison and Norman were with her at the library and saw the fight between Rodney and Joe.

=== Season 2 (1965–1966) ===
The first half of the second season focused on the Rodney Harrington murder trial and the concurrent struggle of Allison Mackenzie after she was injured in a hit-and-run accident and left in a coma.

Rodney is accused in the death of Joe Chernak, who refused to accept Rita's dumping him and falling for Norman. District Attorney John Fowler (John Kerr), son of the former DA who retired heartsick over learning he got a wrongful conviction against Elliot, is also unaware his wife Marian (Joan Blackman), is the driver who struck Allison. Elliot and Steven suspect the younger Fowler wants to avenge his father via another Harrington, since Leslie's original failure convicted Elliot. Against his family attorney's advice, Rodney gives a statement to the police and the DA. Leslie returns to Peyton Place, and ultimately succeeds in getting Rodney bail. Only Allison truly believes in Rodney's innocence before her accident, which happened after she visited Rodney in jail. Norman is haunted by his wish that Joe were dead because he abused Rita. The return of autocratic patriarch Martin Peyton (George Macready) fascinates and unnerves Peyton Place.

A changing Betty also believes in Rodney's innocence: she answered Rodney's original call for an ambulance after Joe fell. Leslie can't convince Rodney to file for a change-of-venue, fearing his own past will prejudice a local jury. Joe's sister Stella Chernak (Lee Grant), a biochemist, arrives home from California and wants Rodney behind bars though she knows he didn't intend to kill Joe. Her father, Gus Chernak (Bruce Gordon), struggling to overcome alcohol, blames Leslie for his own failures -— Leslie demoted then tried to fire him for drunkenness —- and for his son's death, hoping Rodney pays for Leslie's sins. The Fowlers separate after Marian admits being tempted to an affair with physical therapist Russ Gehring (David Canary). Stella lies at the preliminary hearing, after Michael hires her to help launch his medical research lab. Suspiciously, she is reluctant to submit a complete personnel file. Rodney finally hires Steven as his sole defense attorney.

Stella alienates most of Peyton Place except Michael, with whom she becomes somewhat romantically involved. Rita and Kim have emotional problems over the case, Rita blaming herself but refusing her mother Ada's urge to have them leave town before the trial begins. Betty steals Stella's personnel file knowing Steven needs background help on Stella. To Betty's surprise, stoic, hard-nosed Nurse Choate (Erin O'Brien-Moore) defends her though Michael demands her resignation.

Allison's coma worries her parents and friends. Fowler subpoenas Rita, whom Steven wanted as a defense witness, but her emotional testimony exposes Joe's seedy character. Norman stays by her side and they elope after she testifies. Doris Schuster takes Kim back to New York. Martin moves back into the mansion and David moves to the local inn where Leslie is already staying. Allison emerges from her coma slowly but with no memory of the entire past year. Rodney fears his grandfather is even more manipulative than his father. Betty rejects Leslie's offer to help her find a new job. Stella is at increasing odds with her father over Joe's memory and character. David Schuster subdues Gus after Gus destroys mill equipment, but Gus collapses. Michael determines he's dying of cirrhosis of the liver. Gus dies after walking out of the hospital to confront Martin at the mansion. Stella perjures herself during the trial.

Michael advises Constance not to tell Allison about Elliot again just yet, which angers him. Russ keeps the secret of Marian Fowler hitting Allison after leaving his home. Steven's West Coast detective unearths embarrassing information on Stella, including her theft of lab samples and pinning the rap on a former boyfriend, Richard Jensen (Don Gordon). Steven convinces David to bring Kim back to testify at the trial. The jury convicts Rodney. Steven brings Jensen to Peyton Place, where he sets Stella up in a drug theft from the hospital. This prompts Stella to confess to Michael and then, formally, to Fowler, that she lied about Rodney. Marian also confesses to her husband that she was the driver who hit Allison. Rodney's conviction is overturned with Stella's confession and he's exonerated. Stella leaves Peyton Place quietly, pleasing almost everyone including Michael by this point.

Allison has now re-learned the truth of the previous year. At first she can't deal with it and rebels against her past, even cutting her trademark long hair and denouncing her parents. Michael convinces her to stop acting selfishly and return home, where she gradually accepts her parents again. She also wants to marry Rodney no matter his financial standing, but Rodney wants to build his own equity first. Martin offers Leslie the mill if Rodney agrees to live in the mansion under Martin's guidance. Rodney is outraged by the agreement but stays in the mansion until he buys the Shoreline Garage with his inheritance, needing to work and accomplish on his own without the Peyton/Harrington influence. Betty and Steven marry at the mansion and honeymoon before moving into the home Hannah bought for them.

The second half focuses mostly on a childhood accident involving Chris Webber (Gary Haynes) seventeen years earlier. He fell from a Sailors' Bluff cliff and was blinded in the accident; young Ann Colby was accused of pushing him. Returning to Peyton Place as an adult under her former married name, Ann Howard (Susan Oliver) wants to prove her innocence. Chris' tough brother, Lee (Stephen Oliver), accused Ann, who left town with her father following the accident. Lee now tries to bully her out of town. His wife, Sandy (Lana Wood), suffering under his abusive personality, is pushed toward Rodney, for whom Lee works at the garage and about whom Lee was suspicious before meeting Sandy. Ann also befriends Allison and becomes romantically involved with Michael. Chris arrives to visit, surprising his brother and sister-in-law who expected to drive to Boston to bring him back. Allison continues struggling with her identity after her breakup with Rodney. Leslie's bargain with Martin has severe consequences for Rodney's relationship with Norman.

Hannah Cord (Ruth Warrick), Martin's housekeeper/assistant, wants to make Ann leave town as well. Only Betty is unafraid to challenge Martin. He admires that quality in her and hires her as his second assistant. Hannah, meanwhile, carries a dark secret about son Steven's past. Steven remains suspicious of Betty's feelings for Rodney despite the fact Rodney and Betty were annulled long before he met Betty. After it is established that Steven has spent much of his life living in the Peyton Manor with his "mother", Hannah, and the Peyton-Harringtons, Betty and the Harringtons expect that Martin will reveal he's Steven's father. Steven tells Betty he himself doen’t know; he's always been waiting for someone to tell him. Even though Hannah and Martin obviously know of Steven's expectation to be told of his apparent Peyton and Cord lineage, they allowed him to believe the falsehood.

In time, it is revealed Steven and Ann are twins, the illegitimate children of Brian Cord and Catherine Peyton, who bore them out of wedlock. Rodney discovers the truth by accident when he overhears Martin and Hannah. Ann was sent away with her father, Brian, while Hannah adopted Steven as a punishment to her ex-husband Brian. Only Martin and Hannah know the truth before Betty learns it from Rodney. Martin and Hannah tell Betty the truth will destroy Steven. Her effort to keep silent at first causes Steven to think she's seeing Rodney secretly. The Cords separate until Steven learns Ann really is his twin. Betty's mother Julie reveals she rejected Leslie's marriage proposal and plans to reconcile with her recovering husband, George, away from Peyton Place. Steven and Ann face it together and begin reconciling when Ann dies in an accident off the same bluff where Chris fell and was blinded.

Allison discovers Ann first and calls Elliot, who calls police. In a concurrent confrontation, Lee admits pushing Ann off the bluff to his brother Chris and becomes the main suspect in Ann's death, though Martin and Leslie each suspect Hannah is involved somehow. With Rodney having proposed to Allison only a few hours before, a proposal she rejected, an angry Chris tells her that she is incapable of loving anyone—even Rodney—which strikes a nerve making her realize his statement is true. Allison suffers a breakdown and is hospitalized, but walks out of the hospital, alarming her parents, Michael, and Rodney, among others. The townspeople start to look for Allison but without any luck. Lee is arrested for Ann's murder. He asks a judge to appoint Steven as his attorney. Steven first rejects then reluctantly agrees to the idea, after he begins questioning whether Ann's past drove her to suicide. Chris turns his back on Lee and becomes outraged when he finds out about Steven defending him. Chris tries to convince Steven to withdraw from the case and also tries to push Sandy—abused by her husband yet still trying to love him—to stop protecting Lee. Michael finds Allison near Sailor's Bluff and returns her to the hospital.

Michael is astonished that Steven will defend Lee, while Steven tries to keep Lee on what he calls a "nice and short" leash after getting him bail. Betty thinks Steven's defending Lee out of a desire for vengeance against Martin and Hannah. Steven admits to her he thinks they killed Ann somehow. Allison leaves the hospital again. After taunting Rodney at the garage, Lee taunts Allison into leaving Peyton Place, unaware she's already given up on her hometown where all her previous beliefs were shattered. After looking at Rodney through the garage window one last time, Allison walks slowly down the road out of town to a variation on the show's main title music. (This reflected Mia Farrow leaving the show to accommodate the desire of her then-husband, Frank Sinatra). The townspeople are stunned by Allison's disappearance, but Constance and Elliot are especially stunned. Friends try to keep Constance occupied while Elliot suspects Lee is responsible for Allison's disappearance. So does DA Fowler, who revokes Lee's bail when he learns Lee confronted Allison directly before she left, violating his bail conditions.

(Note: Lola Albright fills in for Dorothy Malone as Constance for several episodes.)

=== Season 3 (1966–1967) ===
The first season in color, Season Three focuses on three things: Constance and Elliot and their newborn son; the preliminary hearing for Lee Webber; and the arrival and troubles of young Rachel Welles (Leigh Taylor-Young).

The season begins with Connie going into premature labor and giving birth to the son she names Matthew [gift from God]. Rita is happy for the Carsons but desires her own baby, but Norman says if she does he'll have to drop out of college to work full-time. Rita abandons the idea and works as Matthew's babysitter as a second job. Baby Matthew is a hit with the townspeople, especially over-doting grandfather Eli. Connie and Elliot balance being doting parents to their new son with continuing concern over Allison's disappearance.

Steven takes heat for serving as Lee's reluctant defense attorney. The hearing's early highlights include troubling testimony and new doubts from Michael over his fiancée Ann's death. Ground down by Lee's abuse, his estranged wife Sandy shows interest in Rodney. Blind brother Chris testifies against Lee, convinced Lee is guilty. Both John and Steven try to outsmart each other—directly as well as in court. Norman and Rita are shocked to find Rachel hiding in an old abandoned cabin—in possession of a bracelet Elliot once gave Allison as a gift. Hannah first tries to slip out of Peyton Place but returns and tries to distance herself from Martin. Betty is aghast when she determines Steven intends to grill his mother on the witness stand if need be. The hearing draws a lot of townspeople's attention, largely because of Hannah's and Martin Peyton's scheduled testimonies.

Steven rebukes Hannah's reconciliation attempt. His hard interrogation provokes Hannah's confession that Catherine Peyton's affair with her husband Brian Cord produced both Steven and Ann, and that Martin tried to hide the scandal by hiring Hannah and letting her claim Steven as her son, while Ann was sent to live with Brian, whom Martin paid off to keep quiet. Staggered over the news of his real lineage, Steven denounces Hannah. Hannah also testifies she saw Lee push Ann off the cliff, provoking Lee to explode that he didn't push her. Hannah's revelation staggers the Harrington men, too, with Norman leaving the courtroom mixed in rage and sorrow. Leslie refuses Martin's apology and confession of his failure at Catherine's graveside. Rodney tells Leslie he won't be a pawn in any more of his father's or his grandfather's "bargains." A lack of concrete evidence and Steven's apparent use of the case to settle family scores gets Lee released on a technicality.

Lee returns home happy but he's not welcomed home, and his claim of vindication is denounced because he wasn't technically proven innocent. Chris steals Ada Jacks's gun, planning to shoot Lee whom he believes a murderer. Lee tricks Steven into going to the Webber house where Chris tries to shoot him thinking he's Lee. The bullet grazes Steven's topcoat. Steven helps Sandy cover for Chris and send him away from Peyton Place to start his life over. In a heated argument with Lee, Steven promises to make him pay for killing Ann. Sandy files for divorce and pursues Rodney, who still needs to learn the truth about Allison until Connie convinces him lovingly to go on with his life.

Rachel turns out a runaway who reacts violently to anyone trying to get to know her at first. Having Allison's bracelet makes Elliott think she knows more about Allison's fate. Rodney gets Rachel to say she found the bracelet on a road. But only Michael is able to get truly close to her, discovering her uncle Jack Chandler (John Kellogg) abused her, and trying to protect her from him. Jack tries to make her return with him, which frightens her. She threatens to tell everyone that she found Allison's bracelet in the floor of his truck if he keeps on harassing her, after which he gives up his legal claim to her custody—but he threatens to harm the Carsons and their newborn son if Rachel ever reveals the truth.

Michael takes a break from Peyton Place. Elliot suspects he's seen Chandler in the past but can't remember where. After initial reluctance, Rachel moves into the Carson home after Rodney urges her to accept people's generosity. She's overjoyed when Michael returns and gives her a puppy as a gift but discouraged when Michael offers only friendship. She soon notices Elliot and Constance quarrel a lot about her. Fearing she might break up their marriage, she leaves the house and tries to end all confusion by trying to prove Chandler was responsible for Allison's disappearance. This leads her to his old farmhouse, where she is attacked by him. She is able to run away and returns to Peyton Place in tears. Elliot comforts her and finally admits that he wants to take care of her, even if she does not reveal any information on Allison.

An unexpected period of peace ends when Rachel is again harassed by Chandler, who sells his farm and moves to Peyton Place, where he strong-arms Leslie into hiring him at the mill and continues harassing Rachel. Elliot seems to get closer to the truth about Chandler. After the preliminary hearing, Martin accuses Steven of leaving the grown-ups to clean up "his" mess yet again. Steven and Betty find the Peyton mansion ablaze, compelling Steven to rescue Martin. Departing Hannah started the fire by torching the oil portrait of Catherine. After hospitalized Martin asks Steven his "price" for saving him, Steven names it—and moves into the mansion with Betty, ostensibly to keep his enemy close. Martin does the same with Lee, whom he hires as his chauffeur, hoping to make him pay eventually for killing Ann. Leslie, meanwhile, is unamused with Steven seeming to have become Peyton's favorite son; Steven, concurrently, is uneasy about Martin trying to maneuver him into a political future. Rodney and Sandy enjoy dates but when Lee tries to strong-arm Sandy physically into returning to her marriage, Rodney surprisingly knocks Lee down with a punch.

Fearing that Martin has now disinherited Rodney and Norman, Leslie blackmails Betty into stealing Martin's will, threatening to reveal a report which falsely claims Betty was dating several men while in New York. Betty is shocked when she reads the changed will—naming her the Peyton heir on condition she marries Rodney within a year of Martin's death. Martin hopes to maneuver Betty and Steven's breakup and Betty's remarriage to Rodney, but Rodney is aghast at the maneuvers and rejects Betty's apparent buying in to the Peyton image. Elliot discovers the odd belt buckle once belonging to Chandler that Rachel has carried was made in a Texas prison, and eventually that Chandler—real name Jack Forrest—served time for deadly assault. Elliot and Chandler get into a fiery argument that ends in violence and Elliot's jailing and Chandler's hospitalization. Elliot is free on bail and Steven as his attorney ramps up investigations into Chandler's past. In the hospital, Chandler vows harm to the Carsons for challenging him and sheltering Rachel. But Chandler subsequently leaves Peyton Place, enraging Steven and Elliot because Chandler never received justice for his crimes against Rachel and others.

Meanwhile, Steven receives the detective report about Betty for his birthday party, investigates it himself, and tells a stunned party he received it from an anonymous coward—though he later confronts Martin and accuses the old man of sending it. Genuinely shocked over learning the conditions in Martin's changed will, Rodney urges suspicious Steven not to believe the detective report's lies. The truth about Leslie blackmailing Betty eventually comes out, and Leslie is denounced, while Betty is forgiven. Chandler returns and Lee reluctantly invites him to stay at his house. Rodney and Sandy break up and Martin offers Sandy money to leave town. Sandy spurns the money but leaves for California, and Lee accuses Martin of driving her out of town. Despite continuing to struggle with his feelings about his family heritage and his father's and grandfather's manipulations, Rodney tries to convince Norman to accept financial help from his grandfather.

Posing as Elliot, now-returned Chandler picks Rachel up at night school, kidnaps her, and forces her away, where we learn Rachel accidentally killed her aunt Lucy, which Allison witnessed, and refused to speak of Allison because it meant admitting involuntary manslaughter. Chandler also tries to pin the death of Rachel's parents in a fire on her. Rachel kidnaps baby Matthew after she's released from the hospital following her own fresh escape from Chandler. Meanwhile, Chandler is arrested by the police and Rachel leaves Matthew at the hospital. Rachel escapes but loses her mind, thinking she's Allison. Michael finally decides to send her to a clinic in Boston. Connie now wants every trace of Allison and Rachel both out of her house. Leslie continues his criminal actions by slipping a gun to Chandler to help Chandler escape jail. Norman sees it and blackmails his father into giving him a job, so he can support Rita, who now is pregnant.

At the end of the season, the town is stirred by the arrival of Adrienne Van Leyden (Gena Rowlands) and Eddie Jacks (Dan Duryea). Adrienne is a widow hired by Martin to break up Steven's and Betty's already unstable marriage. Adrienne seduces Steven into an affair. Michael suspects Adrienne caused her husband's death. Meanwhile, Ada is unamused by the arrival of her estranged husband Eddie, who left her 19 years ago and who once considered Chandler a friend. He insists on getting back in touch with his daughter, and Rita is shocked when she meets him.

=== Season 4 (1967–1968) ===
The primary focus of season four remains Adrienne Van Leyden and Eddie Jacks and the havoc they provoke, until the arrival of young mother Jill Smith and a crisis she provokes for Constance and Elliot Carson, Michael Rossi, and Rev. Tom Winter and his wife, but the season ends with the immediate aftermath of Rodney Harrington's injury in a motorcycle accident.

Adrienne has mixed feelings at first about Martin's manipulations between her and Steven, even as Martin buys her an engagement ring and proclaims their engagement. Steven strains to relieve Betty's suspicions about Adrienne's interest in him, but Adrienne seems to fall in love with Steven. Steven has mixed feelings about Adrienne but gives in to her temptations. Meanwhile, shocking facts about her past come to light, particularly her having driven her husband—a highly respected medical researcher under whom Michael once studied—to suicide, when he found himself too ground down to resist the pressure of her demands after he sacrificed his career for her.

Betty follows Steven and Adrienne to Martin's Boston home and confirms her suspicions. Returning home, she leaves Steven and stays at the Colonial Inn. Rodney, to whom Betty now turns for comfort, can't convince Norman his interest in her is friendship alone. Adrienne visits Betty at the inn but Betty rebuffs her and tells Rod she plans to hire an out-of-town attorney to handle her divorce. Steven confronts Martin and Adrienne about their maneuvers, then storms to the Shoreline Garage and awakens Rod, accusing him of being in on the plot. When Steven accuses Rod of being in on the plot, he angrily turns Rod's bed over with Rod still in it, and Rod knocks him down with a punch.

Adrienne tells Martin she plans to leave Peyton Place. Eddie tries to tell Steven about Adrienne's scandalous past and Martin about Steven's plan to have the old man declared incompetent. Ada wants Eddie to stay away from Rita, who wants to learn more about her father after initial reluctance. Norman and Martin each suspect Eddie intends to profit off Rita's marriage into a wealthy family. As the Cords head toward divorce, Betty and Rod become reluctantly closer. Leslie won't hire Eddie but their secret meetings have Elliot thinking Eddie is connected somehow to Jack Chandler, whom we learned was killed in a confrontation with out-of-town police. Ada reluctantly hires Eddie at the tavern, on Elliot's persuasion. Norman suffers rib injuries when Eddie punches and shoves him during an argument. Betty confronts Adrienne again, this time at the Peyton mansion, the night before Adrienne's wedding to Martin, but Adrienne falls down the long stairs after turning away from Betty and dies when she hits the bottom.

Sneaking into the mansion under a contract from Leslie to kill Martin, Eddie instead finds Adrienne's dead body. Lee calls police accusing Eddie of killing her, and Eddie is jailed. Rita sees him being taken to the jail and staggers running after him, forcing her hospitalization. Steven agrees to defend Eddie reluctantly, hoping to learn the truth—but he learns Betty was the dark-haired girl Eddie saw run from the mansion. Rita forces her husband and mother to tell the truth about Eddie's arrest. For reasons she can barely explain, Connie takes Adrienne's death particularly hard, puzzling Elliot.

Martin visits Eddie in jail and learns Leslie contracted Eddie to kill him. He agrees to pay $50,000 for the signed document, and Eddie insists the money go to Norman and Rita. Martin convinces Lee to kill Leslie in revenge, hoping Leslie and Lee kill each other. Leslie shoots Lee as an intruder at his office. Severely wounded, Lee returns to the mansion crying out against Martin's betrayal, revealing the abusive childhood that turned Lee into an abusive, at-war-with-the-world young man. Steven stops Lee from shooting Martin but the gun discharges during their struggle and kills Lee. Steven knows it discharged accidentally, though Martin suggests he avenged his sister's death. Steven also tries to force Betty into acting like his loving wife by threatening to investigate her in Adrienne's death, but he admits Adrienne's death was an accident.

Martin decides to leave Peyton Place for his health's sake. Eddie decides to leave, too, but Rita collapses when she learns of this. Two surgeries reveal she miscarried. Steven and Betty have a violent argument during which Steven strikes her several times; her bruises enrage Rod, who confronts Steven about it. Jill Smith (Joyce Jillson) comes to town with an infant she claims is Allison Mackenzie's child, provoking battles between the Carsons—to whom Jill gives the baby for care—and Rod, who thinks he may be the baby's father, but who was unaware Allison might have been pregnant when she left Peyton Place after rejecting his marriage proposal. Joe Rossi (Michael Christian), Michael's shady brother, arrives in town hoping Michael will help him get one more chance to fix his life—but Joe turns out to have his own agenda, which Michael sees when Joe sees Jill in the square and freezes a moment at the sight of her. Jill has the same reaction.

Depressed Rita thinks Joe resembles her late, abusive ex-boyfriend Joe Chernak. Rita contacts Reverend Tom Winter (Robert Hogan), unhappily married to alcoholic wife Susan (Diana Hyland), who also serves as emotional support for rebellious teenager Carolyn Russell (Elizabeth Walker). Steven, who's become Jill's attorney, has ulterior motives for wanting to resolve the issue of the baby's paternity—a way to strike back at still confused Rod. Betty tells Rod she'll help care for the baby if she's his but can't love her because she's Allison's. Jill is really scheming with Joe, who hit town following criminal activities gone wrong, trying to avoid his old New York gang. Joe finds Rita, who's been missing an entire day, and tries to convince her he's not Chernak. This sets off a chain reaction of events from Eddie attacking Joe thinking he's Chernak attacking Rita to the revelation that the baby is really Jill's—in New York, she learned enough about Allison to pose as Allison and thus show Allison as the baby's mother. Joe knows and reveals that means he's the baby's father.

The revelation stuns Michael and outrages the Carsons, and Elliot accuses Michael of deceiving the Carsons. Eddie finally leaves Peyton Place, convinced at last that his presence hurts more than helps Rita. Connie—who never stopped hoping, albeit quietly, that daughter Allison might yet return somehow—suffers a breakdown. Rita tells Ada she no longer fears her past. Elliot persuades Connie they should leave Peyton Place with baby son Matthew and start over fresh. Michael and Elliot reconcile before the Carsons leave. Neither Rod, Betty, Michael, nor Eli can persuade them to change their minds. Steven discovers uncomfortably that Susan has more than a casual legal interest in him. Tom's marital problems cause him to doubt his worth as a minister, even as he hires Jill as a temporary secretary at Susan's persuasion.

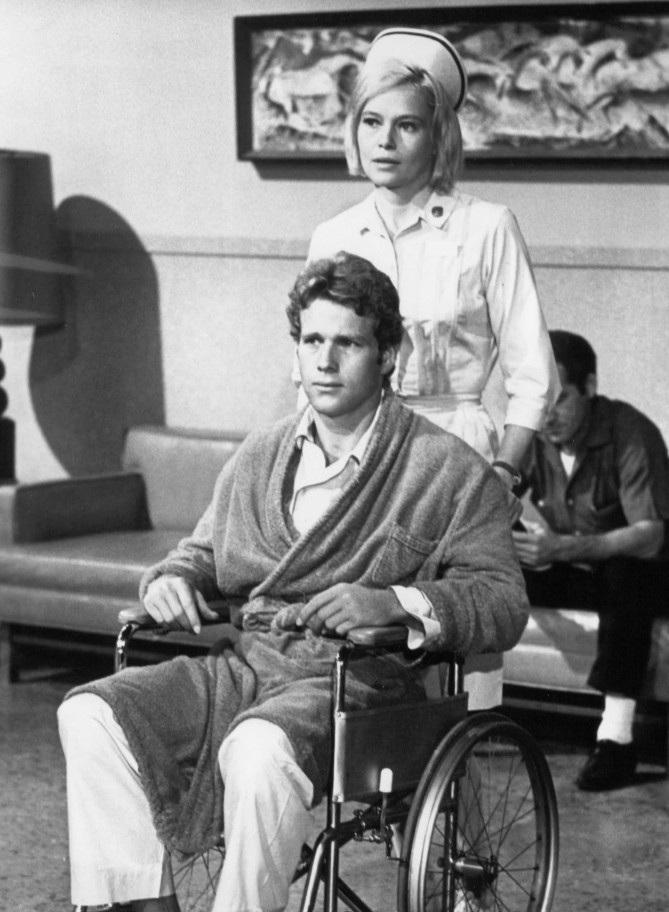
Rodney will struggle to recover from his accident.

Leslie is staggered when the son of Martin's Boston attorney arrives with the news that Peyton Mills has been sold and Leslie is out, news that surprises his sons when he tells them over dinner. Susan encourages Tom to take Jill under his wing—hoping her youth and beauty will entice him out of the ministry to spend more time with his wife. Betty's mother Julie returns for the wedding, but Betty refuses to let her mother drag the past back into her present and future. Uninvited Steven attends Rod and Betty's wedding ceremony anyway and hands them an unexpected gift, which he got from his grandfather by way of a surprise and uncomfortable one-time meeting with Hannah—then vows to Susan that he'll stop at nothing to break them up. Carolyn can't deal with divorcing parents Marsha (Barbara Rush) and Fred (Joe Maross), acting out by flirting with Joe and dating a band musician, behavior that escalates as Marsha begins dating Michael.

The newly remarried Harringtons enjoy a brief honeymoon and begin putting their new house into shape. Ada gives Rita and Norman Eddie's parting gift—the $50,000 Eddie got from Martin, which Eddie insisted be made out to Rita and Norman. Norman persuades reluctant Rod to take him as a garage partner converting it to motorcycle repair and sale. Steven discovers the promissory note Eddie sold to Martin and steals it from Martin's lawyers. Fred tells Marsha and Carolyn he's being transferred out of town, allowing them to make new lives, but Carolyn can't accept it at first. Jill fears her presence in the Winter home may compromise the Winters' marriage, but Tom reminds her she may lose custody of baby Kelly if she leaves. Carolyn finally accepts her parents' divorce and uses it to date whom she pleases. Tom thinks Susan is plotting to break up their marriage by setting him up to be seduced by Jill. Steven confronts Ada with the stolen promissory note but Ada won't help him find its truth.

Norman has persuaded Rod to hire Steven to handle the new motorcycle shop's legal affairs, but Steven still hopes to break up Rod and Betty. After selling a bike to a student, Rod and Norman ride another bike back to the shop but they're inadvertently run off the road by Steven—with Betty in his car—and Rod is seriously injured when he's thrown into a tree. When Rod tells Michael at the hospital he can't feel anything, Michael brings him to critical neck surgery and Rod begins a long, painful recovery from his paralysis. Steven's attempt to comfort Betty is rebuffed angrily when she demands he stay out of their lives once and for all. Uninjured Norman is pounded with guilt over his brother's condition. Tom defends Jill against Susan's accusations. Neurosurgeon Harry Miles fears Michael is delaying further surgery on Rod. Leslie returns to town and accuses Steven of causing Rod's accident deliberately.

Tom admits to Michael that Susan is an alcoholic and Michael recommends a sanitarium. Jill finally leaves the Winters home, and Tom blames Susan. Betty, Norman, and Rita struggle to hide emotions when visiting Rod. Tom searches for Jill unaware she's staying secretly at Ada's, but he eventually finds her and tells her she and he were meant to be together. Leslie leaves town again, but not before telling Betty he doesn't approve of her remarrying Rod. Rod begins regaining some feeling but is aware his full recovery isn't guaranteed. Jill rejects Tom and he tries to leave the ministry, but Jill flees when a social worker tries to take Kelly. Susan is hospitalized after a drunken rage. Rod orders Steven to leave after Steven offers help and asks forgiveness. Tom leaves the ministry and moves out, getting a lobster trapping job and moving into a fishing boat on the wharf. Jill reluctantly surrenders Kelly to child welfare authorities who give her to Norman and Rita temporarily, after Steven tries but fails to convince Judge Chester Jill was a victim of Susan's plot. Rita offers to help Jill regain custody of Kelly. Tom's church overseer refuses to let him leave the ministry.

(During this season, Wilfrid Hyde-White plays Martin Peyton during a brief absence by George Macready.)

=== Season 5 (1968–1969) ===
Ed Nelson remains the show's lead actor following Dorothy Malone's departure near the end of Season Four; Elizabeth Walker (Carolyn) and Barbara Rush (Marsha) are added to the opening credits. The final season revolves largely around Michael Rossi and Marsha Russell, but also around Rodney Harrington's painful try at recovering from paralysis, Jill and Joe, and African-American neurosurgeon Harry Miles (Percy Rodriguez) who is hit with an unexpected family crisis involving his young son.

Michael offers Jill a nursing job while Carolyn becomes more serious with young bandleader Jeff Kramer (John Findlater). Joe objects to Norman and Rita having custody of baby Kelly. Rod isn't comfortable with his therapist. Tom plans to divorce Susan. Norman is concerned about Betty turning to Steven for comfort as Rod's recovery continues painfully. Carolyn learns a truth about her parents' marriage the hard way, when she discovers father Fred is dating a much younger woman, Donna. Betty criticizes Norman for not trusting her. Tom walks out of the ministry and goes to work on a fishing boat. Marsha admits to Carolyn she knew about Fred and Donna before she divorced Fred, but Carolyn blames her mother for the affair. Susan threatens to claim Tom and Jill had an affair if Tom tries divorcing her. Judge Chester reveals Jill leaving the Winter home wasn't the reason he awarded custody of Kelly to Norman and Rita.

Rod fears Betty no longer wants to be with him. Michael persuades reluctant Jill to take a job as a nurse's aide in training to become a full nurse. Fred admits to Carolyn his affair began after the day he feared he no longer loved Marsha. Susan threatens to ruin Tom unless he takes her back. Joe can't admit he still has feelings for Jill—even as he accuses Tom falsely of hiding her and beats him viciously. Marsha tries to convince Carolyn her father is the reason for the divorce. Betty goes to work at the Harrington brothers' motorcycle shop. Harry tries to convince Rod to find his will to use his slowly recovering body again. Joe frets over his relationship with baby Kelly. Marsha tries to break things off with Michael because of Carolyn's disapproval. Michael concurrently fears Rod is now pushing himself too hard to recover. Harry and his wife Alma (Ruby Dee) fear their son, Lew (Glynn Turman) doesn't want to come home, but they soon prepare for his arrival.

Marsha catches Carolyn and Jeff near intimacy, leading to a lecture about sex. Michael convinces Marsha she can't let Carolyn's feelings dictate her life, and they become engaged. Young Lew Miles returns home to his parents. Despite her new job at the hospital, Jill fears she has nothing to offer baby Kelly. Susan drops adultery charges in favor of mental cruelty, then kisses Steven. Carolyn interrogates Michael about his intentions toward her mother, then feels jealous over Jeff's suspected interest in singer Nancy. Rod goes outside on hospital grounds for the first time since his accident, alarming Betty whom he didn't allow to accompany him, with Betty now fearing he wants to punish her. Harry and Alma wonder if Lew has changed radically. Joe tells Jill he wants to marry her, while Carolyn mourns the possible loss of her romance with Jeff.

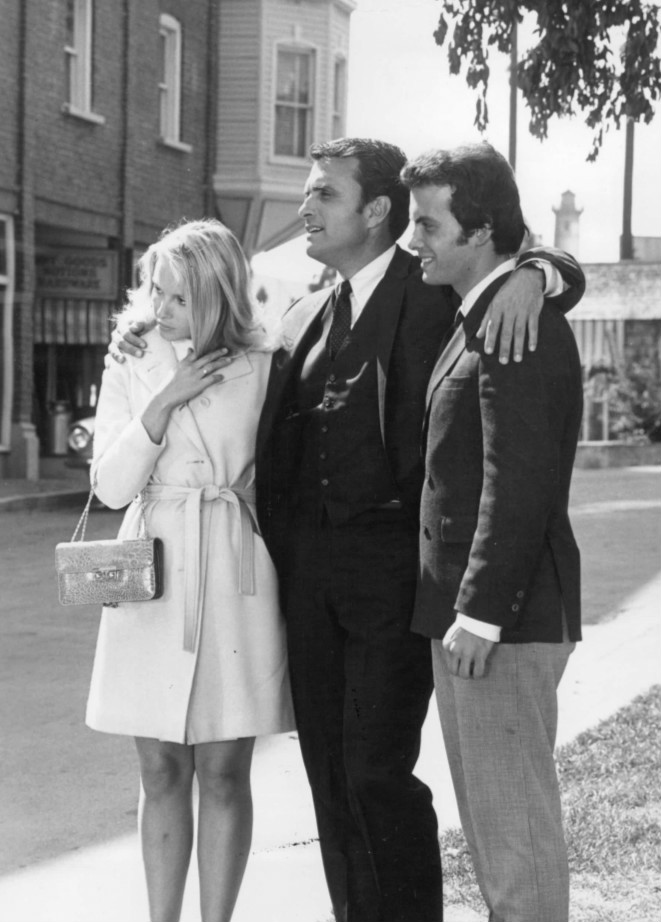
The marriage of Jill and Joe.

Joe seems intent on leaving Peyton Place, causing guilt feelings for brother Michael, until Jill comes to reconcile with him. Harry and Alma discover Lew has been skipping classes. Rod is edgy when he sees Betty and Steven talking. Joe and Jill get married and regain custody of Kelly and leave Peyton Place soon after. Jill says goodbye to Tom, which sinks him even deeper into his emotional struggle, while Susan tries to reach out to him with Jill now gone. Rod ends his therapy, upsetting Michael. Lew admits to his parents he was edgy about how Black people are treated in New York. Steven tries a tough approach with Rod—threatening to try pursuing Betty again unless Rod continues his therapy—but all that does is make Rod reluctant to see Betty. As Betty goes to Tom for advice on her marriage, Steven admits to Susan he still loves Betty, but kisses Susan. A phone call from Hannah Cord interrupts them, with Hannah revealing Martin Peyton's death.

Carolyn and Jeff begin seeing each other again. Steven immediately focuses on Martin's will. Harry fears his son will compromise a future medical career. Michael sees Carolyn follow Jeff into the empty Shoreline, the regular performance venue for Jeff's band. He then advises Marsha not to interfere until Carolyn confirms that she isn't sexually active with Jeff. Betty inherits Martin's money as his will mandated through her marriage to Rod. Lew Miles talks to Michael about his racial identity and struggle with it. Betty urges Rod not to let Steven interfere in their marriage any longer, then shows a little of her new financial power by arranging Martin's funeral over Hannah's and Steven's objections. Lew's constant racial references unsettle Harry, who reminds his son of his own greater struggle in a far less accepting time while going through medical school. Susan wants to conspire with Steven to ruin Betty. Rod begins pushing himself harder to recover, while Steven drops none-too-subtle sly innuendos.

Fred orders Jeff to stay away from Carolyn, then threatens to sue Marsha for custody of their daughter. After Marsha turns to Michael for counsel, Michael formally proposes to Marsha. Norman admits to Rita he thinks Betty isn't the right wife for Rod, but Rita disagrees and after they argue she goes to her mother Ada's to stay awhile. Carolyn tells Fred she wants to live with him until she finds him with another young woman. Norman and Betty argue over the portrait Martin had done of her, while Betty ponders buying the Peyton mansion. Marsha accepts Michael's marriage proposal. Susan tells Betty she intends to live in the Peyton mansion with Steven, while the future Rossis visit the Mileses for dinner. Phone calls between Lew and a woman in New York alarm his parents and cause his girlfriend Joanne Walker (Jeanne Buckley)—the daughter of a Peyton Place police sergeant—to fear he cheated on her there. Fred suggests to Carolyn he wants to reconcile with her mother, but Marsha refuses to consider it.

Betty offers Steven a fat price for the mansion, while Steven orders Susan to tell Rod Betty has been seeing him. Norman and Rita have settled their argument and now try playing matchmaker for widow Maggie Riggs (Florida Friebus), with Eli Carson as the intended match. Marsha persuades Michael to elope. Lew's New York friend, Vickie Fletcher (Judy Pace), arrives in Peyton Place, declares her pregnancy, and attempts to blackmail Lew, threatening to lie about him to police, though she acknowledges to Lew that another young man is the actual father. We learn Lew was involved in a hit-and-run accident in New York that left someone in a coma. Lew surprises his parents by agreeing to marry Vickie. After Steven accepts Betty's offer, Betty follows him to Boston where they both learn Martin changed his will yet again—sending all his money to a foundation, thus also cutting out all his grandsons as well as Betty—and she inherits nothing, for which she blames Steven.

Rod relapses after an argument with Betty and Norman blames her for his condition. Eli and Maggie have a blind date on which everything misfires. Harry tries and fails to buy Vickie out of town. Michael informs Betty that Rod now has serious doubts about their marriage, while Carolyn tries to persuade Marsha her father really does want to reconcile. Rita tries to persuade Norman not to interfere in Rod and Betty's marriage, but after Norman and Rod argue about Betty Rod still decides he wants a separation. Harry begins learning more about his son from the police. Eli begins breaking through Maggie's initial hostility. Betty begins packing the house but Rod's ability to move begins to return. Alma wants Vickie to surrender her baby for adoption. Lew tries to learn what his father and Sergeant William Wilson Walker (Morris Buchanan) talked about and promises Vickie to come clean with his father after Harry returns from New York. Concurrently, Lew's fear of exposing himself alienates Joanne.

Angered over Carolyn's refusal to date him steadily again and over Fred attacking him after seeing an argument between him and Carolyn, Jeff lies to Fred that Carolyn is dating Lew. Betty pleads to Rod that she can't live without him while fearing he may think he can. After Fred confronts Marsha saying he believes Carolyn and Lew are dating, Marsha refuses to believe him but she worries how the town would react to an inter-racial romance between two teens. Carolyn forces Jeff to admit to Fred he lied about her and Lew, though Fred doesn't believe it. Now recovering once again, Rod decides to leave Peyton Place and return to college. Maggie fears she hurt Eli by going on an ice fishing trip. Lew is uncomfortable with Carolyn and wants to stop hanging out with her, fearing their racial differences. Maggie tells Eli sad details about her marriage, including the lack of true togetherness she experienced with her late husband. Rod finally admits he believes he and Betty have a future together. Realising she loves Rod more than anything, including money, Betty goes to Boston with him to help him prepare for and work through college, surprising Steven.

Fred's continued insistence that Lew and Carolyn really are dating has ramifications for Harry, who fears Fred had something to do with a patient refusing Harry's treatment. Carolyn can't convince her father she and Lew are only friends, and Carolyn and Lew's alleged romance is the talk of the high school. When Betty returns to wind up her and Rod's Peyton Place affairs, including selling their home, Martin's longtime nurse Jennifer Ivers reveals Martin had several wills. Jeff now can't convince Fred he lied about their relationship. Fred tries to stop Carolyn and Lew from entering the school, leading to a heated confrontation with Michael. Michael asks Marsha to marry him that night and she agrees. Carolyn apologises to her mother for not trusting her in the past. Eli proposes to Maggie. Jennifer wants Betty's help to keep Hannah from inheriting any Peyton money, but doesn't reveal she's actually conspiring with Hannah. As Marsha prepares to marry Michael Fred attacks and tries to rape her, but she escapes as police she previously called for protection arrive.

Vickie apologizes to Lew for her blackmail attempt. Steven is shocked to discover Hannah still trying to destroy Betty. Marsha and Sgt. Walker find Michael next to an unconscious Fred. Harry determines Fred suffered a severe skull injury. Remembering what happened to Rod when he gave police a statement over Joe Chernak's accidental death on the wharf—and knowing Michael, too, sought only to try once more to talk Fred away from his former wife—Steven warns Michael not to give police any statement. Lew admits his hit-and-run involvement to Alma. While Steven meets with an assistant district attorney who's building a case against Michael, weakened but still-delusional Fred tells Marsha Michael was responsible for his condition. Harry destroys a police report on Lew. Marsha tells Carolyn what happened to her father. Michael tells Marsha and Sgt. Walker of Fred's death, and Michael is booked for his murder.

Michael is denied bail. Maggie agrees to marry Eli. Susan admits to Tom she has misgivings about Steven defending Michael while still obsessed with the Peyton fortune. Carolyn visits Michael in his cell and tells him she believes he's innocent. Betty and Norman argue over the possibility of Steven finally inheriting Martin's estate. Alma invites Vickie to stay in the Miles home more permanently until they can resolve her pregnancy, now that the Miles know Lew isn't the real father. Harry doesn't want to hear his son's confession, while Marsha asks Tom to arrange Fred's funeral. Michael prepares for his preliminary hearing. Harry learns from Sgt. Walker about a man implicating Lew in the New York hit-and-run. Susan breaks down in front of Tom. Steven thinks Fred may really have died at the hands of the husband or boyfriend of one of his before-and-after-divorce dalliances. Visiting Michael in his jail cell, Rita tells him she thinks she may be pregnant. Walker, Marsha, Norman, Rita, Ada, Harry, and a motel proprietor testify at the preliminary hearing.

Michael is bound over for trial. Lew fears his chances at fairness as a Black youth if he surrenders in the hit-and-run, after seeing a popular white doctor accused of murder, but he agrees to surrender rather than run. Susan plans to visit Michael in jail. The series ends with Michael—who once thought he loved Constance MacKenzie, who did love Ann Howard until her murder, and who prepared to marry Marsha Russell when her ex-husband died, leaving him charged with his murder—alone in his cell, pondering his future, leaving viewers to ponder likewise.

== Characters ==
=== Main cast members ===
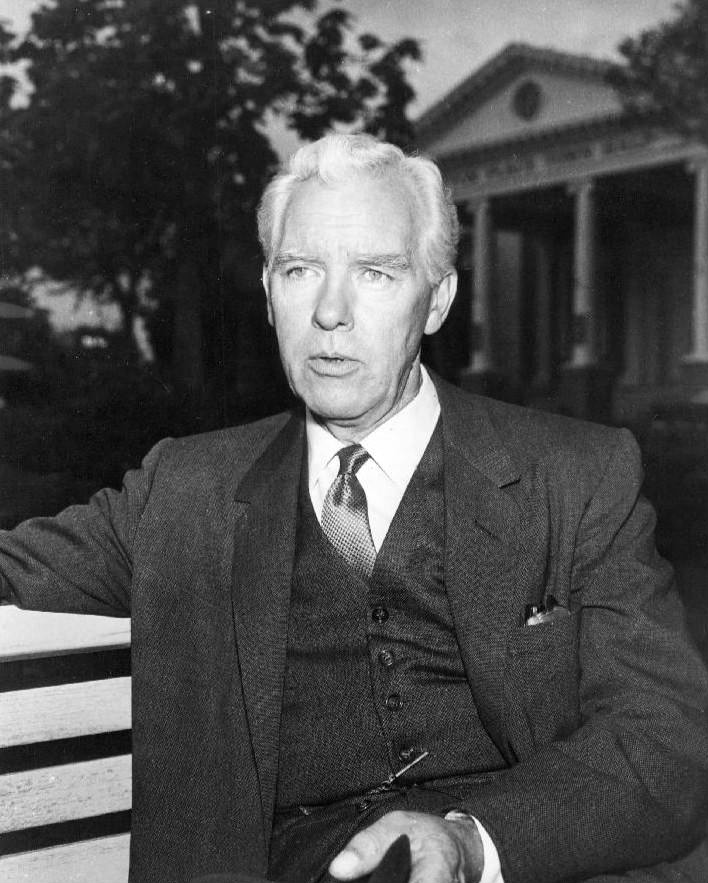
Warner Anderson as Matthew Swain

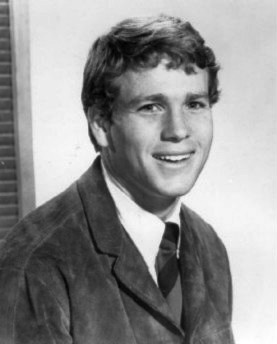
Ryan O'Neal as Rodney Harrington

The following characters appear in the opening credits at some point in the series:

Constance MacKenzie (Dorothy Malone, 1964–1965, 1966–1968, episodes 1–152, 167–445, Lola Albright, 1965–1966, episodes 153–166)
Allison's mother and owner of a local book and gift shop. Although Constance and Allison initially had a good relationship, it was strained after Allison learned that her mother had lied to her about her father's true identity. Constance later marries Allison's father, Elliot Carson, and has a son with him.

Matthew Swain (Warner Anderson, 1964–1965, episodes 1–111)
The editor of the town newspaper. He is the father figure in Allison's life and is a good friend of his second cousin, Constance.

Dr. Michael Rossi (Ed Nelson, 1964–1969, entire run)
A surgeon who moved from New York City to Peyton Place for undeclared reasons. He clashes several times with colleague Dr. Robert Morton but eventually gets accepted in the town. He becomes romantically involved with several people, including Dr. Morton's daughter Claire, until finally falling in love with divorcee Marsha Russell.

Allison MacKenzie (Mia Farrow, 1964–1966, episodes 1–263)
The quiet and smart daughter of Constance, who writes for Matthew's Peyton Place Clarion. She likes to spend her time reading books and usually befriends older people. She also becomes romantically involved with Rodney several times, before an accident leaving her in a temporary coma and re-revelations about Elliot Carson being her real father spur her to re-evaluate her values and leave Peyton Place, without saying goodbye or declaring any plans.

Rodney Harrington (Ryan O'Neal, 1964–1969, episodes 60–501, co-starring episodes 1–59)
The oldest son of Leslie and Catherine Harrington. He is more social and popular than his brother Norman; he is earnest but too prone to wrong place/wrong time events, sometimes instigated by his manipulative elders. He falls for Allison but their relationship never really progresses, first because old girlfriend Betty tries to stop them, later because of Allison's emotional changes following her accident and before her departure. Rodney eventually finds real love with Betty. An interesting fashion note is that the Baracuta G9 jacket that Rodney Harrington often wore, became known as the Harrington jacket and is still sold under that name by Baracuta.

Betty Anderson (Barbara Parkins, 1964–1969, episodes 60–514, co-starring episodes 1–59)
The daughter of George and Julie. She is in love with Rodney and does everything to win him over, although he is in love with Allison. This includes lying about being pregnant and tricking him into marrying her. She later marries Steven Cord but divorces him after discovering his affair, and returns to Rodney, this time without false pretenses, but she has to fight off Steven's obsessive attempts to win her back. Once named a Peyton heiress, she eventually disavows the fortune to make a simpler life with college-returning Rod.

Elliot Carson (Tim O'Connor, 1965–1968, episodes 112–444, co-starring episodes 25–111)
Son of Eli, husband of Connie and father of Allison. He spent 18 years in jail for a false accusation and later became the editor of the local newspaper. He marries Connie and they have a son, Matthew; after several crises draw the couple in deep enough to compromise them, Elliot persuades Connie that they and their son deserve a new better life away from Peyton Place.

Norman Harrington (Christopher Connelly, 1964–1969, episodes 112–514, co-starring episodes 1–111)
The youngest son of Leslie and Catherine and shy younger brother of Rodney. Once in love with Allison, he never had a real chance with her. He later becomes romantically involved with Rita Jacks, despite their social differences. They marry happily but often have to bear the brunt of their loved ones' struggles.

Rita Jacks (Patricia Morrow, 1965–1969, episodes 264–514, co-starring episodes 52–263)
Daughter of Ada and Eddie. She grew up in a poor family but fell in love with wealthy Norman Harrington. Their relationship had its problems, since Rita was constantly bothered by her former boyfriends, but they married happily and weathered several crises together.

Steven Cord (James Douglas, 1965–1969, episodes 268–514, co-starring episodes 77–267)
Believed to be the son of Hannah Cord, but turned out to be the illegitimate son of Catherine Harrington. He starts to work as a lawyer and is involved in a love triangle involving Betty and Rodney while coming to terms with his lineage, later becoming obsessed with claiming his share of the Peyton fortune.

Carolyn Russell (Elizabeth Walker, 1968–1969, episodes 463–514, co-starring episodes 430–462)
The wild daughter of Marsha and Fred who first cannot come to terms with her parents' divorce. After a dangerous flirtation with Joe Rossi, she forges a close friendship with Lew Miles that is compromised when another former boyfriend, Jeff, lashes at her father and tells him she and Lew, who is black, are dating--discomfiting unexpectedly bigoted Fred.

Marsha Russell (Barbara Rush, 1968–1969, episodes 463–514, co-starring 433–462)
The mother of Carolyn and wife of Fred, whose adultery causes her to file for divorce, though the cause seems shielded from their daughter at first. She next falls in love with Michael, and prepared to marry him when her ex-husband died.

Dr. Harry Miles (Percy Rodriguez, 1968–1969, episodes 502–514, co-starring episodes 450–501)
A well-respected surgeon who is married to Alma. He is Lew's father who must come to terms with his son's rejection of the medical career path and his son's involvement in a summer tragedy.

=== Secondary cast members ===
The following characters appear in the closing credits, initially as "featuring", and then as "co-starring" or "also starring":

Leslie Harrington (Paul Langton, 1964–1968, episodes 1–69, 96–436, 452–454)
Husband of Catherine and father of Rodney and Norman. Although Leslie only wanted the best for his family, his manipulative nature made him one of the most hated people of Peyton Place. He covered up the truth about Elizabeth Carson's murder, tried to manipulate his sons against his father-in-law, and eventually left town because of his bad reputation and several more acts bordering on criminal, with one even abetting a murder.

Julie Anderson (Kasey Rogers, 1964–1966, episodes 1–252, 435–436)
Wife of George and mother of Betty. She was introduced as the secretary and secret lover of Leslie. After ending their affair, she became a full-time housewife. Her husband's frustrations and alcoholism compromised their marriage, but when doctors tell her of his improving recovery, she returns to him and starts a new life with him away from Peyton Place.

Catherine Harrington (Mary Anderson, 1964, episodes 2–20)
Daughter of Martin Peyton, wife of Leslie and mother of Rodney and Norman. Despite her death, she remained a character who was recurrently talked about. It was later revealed she was to blame for Elizabeth Carson's murder and was the birth mother of Steven Cord and Ann Howard, a revelation that proves to have dire consequences for both.

Laura Brooks (Patricia Breslin, 1964–1965, episodes 2–36)
Sister of Leslie and widow of Dr. Donald Brooks. After Dr. Rossi arrived in town, she immediately fell in love with him and became his secretary. They never had a relationship. She eventually left town to move to Europe, explaining she could not live in a town with so many problems.

George Anderson (Henry Beckman, 1964–1965, episodes 4–59)
Husband of Julie and father of Betty. Known as the aggressive guy, and a problem drinker, who abused his wife. He eventually loses his mind and is taken to a sanatorium, but his surprising recovery leads to his marriage's revival away from Peyton Place.

Dr. Robert Morton (Kent Smith, 1964–1965, episodes 8–137, 214–240)
Husband of Grace and father of Claire. He was a rival of Dr. Rossi, but they later reconciled. He is a close friend of the Harrington family.

Eli Carson (Frank Ferguson, 1964–1969, episodes 18–507)
Caring father of Elliot Carson. Carson never had a substantial storyline and usually served as a person people went to for advice and a doting grandfather to Elliot and Constance's newborn son Matthew. Married Maggie Riggs during the last months of the series.

Sharon Purcell (Dayna Ceder, 1965, episodes 36–41)
A friend of Betty who lives in New York City. She spends her time seducing older rich men to get what she wants, which causes complications for Betty when a detective mistakes Betty for being the same kind of seducer.

Paul Hanley (Richard Evans, 1965, episodes 38–68)
Brother of Elliot's murdered wife Elizabeth and a professor of English at Peyton College who bonds with Allison when she becomes a student in his Freshman English class. He is an enemy of Elliot, because as a child he gave false testimony which sent Elliot to jail for 18 years.

Calvin Hanley (Whit Bissell, 1965, episodes 38–48)
Father of Elliot's murdererd wife Elizabeth and owner of the drugstore/iced cream parlor. Hates Elliot and was responsible for his son Paul giving testimony against Elliot. Knows more than he lets on about the truth surrounding his daughter's killer.

Theodore "Ted" Dowell (Patrick Whyte, 1964–66, episodes 49–204, uncredited previously)
Leslie Harrington's lawyer and friend, who's also Martin Peyton's lawyer but eventually turns his practise over to Steven Cord.

Claire Morton (Mariette Hartley, 1965, episodes 56–109)
Daughter of Robert and Grace who lived very long in Peru with her husband Vincent. She returned to Peyton Place when her marriage failed, running away from her husband without filing for a divorce. She falls in love with Michael but eventually reconciles with her husband.

Grace Morton (Edith Atwater, 1964–1965, episodes 56–90, uncredited previously)
The mother of Claire Morton and wife of Doctor Robert Morton.

Ada Jacks (Evelyn Scott, 1965–1969, episodes 57–514, uncredited previously)
The mother of Rita and owner of her own Tavern at the wharf. She grew up in the poor side of the town and often feels guilty for not raising Rita the right way when she was a teenager.

Esther Choate (Erin O'Brien-Moore, 1965–1969, episodes 61–507, uncredited previously)
Head Nurse at the hospital, initially antagonistic toward Dr. Rossi and coldly efficient, until she softens as she gets to know both Dr. Rossi and Betty.

David Schuster (William Smithers, 1965–1966, episodes 69–202)
Husband of Doris and father of Kim, who came to town to take over the Peyton Mill from Leslie. He had big marriage problems and was suspected to have feelings for Allison, Kim's babysitter.

Doris Schuster (Gail Kobe, 1965, episodes 69–147, 187–189)
Wife of David and mother of Kim, who is devastated she can not have a close relationship with her daughter, who makes no secret she hates her mother. Because of their different ideas in the raising of Kim, she and David fight a lot.

Kim Schuster (Kimberly Beck, 1965, episodes 69–140, 187–189)
The six-year-old daughter of David and Doris who is deaf. She hates her mother, but is fond of her babysitter, Allison. She suffers a traumatic experience when she witnesses the death of Joe and is forced to testify at Rod Harrington's trial. This upsets her very much, because the events of that night have become very traumatic for her. Doris notices Peyton Place is becoming too much for Kim and decides to leave with her for New York.

Reverend Jerry Bedford (Ted Hartley, 1965–1966, episodes 69–204)
Returns to Peyton Place as the new minister, dates Betty Anderson for a time but loses her to Steven Cord.

Joe Chernak (Don Quine, 1965, episodes 83–113)
The son of Gus and younger brother of Stella who has the reputation for being the bad guy. He is the ex-boyfriend of Rita and is still in love with her. When she starts dating Norman, Joe constantly harasses him and forces the confrontation with Rodney that ended in his accidental death.

Vincent & Kenneth Markham (Leslie Nielsen, 1965, episodes 90–109)
Vincent is the husband of Claire and was left behind in Peru, where he works as a doctor. He also travels to Peyton Place to take his wife back and is eventually visited by his twin brother, Kenneth, who tells him that he is ill and will die if he stays in Peyton Place.

Hannah Cord (Ruth Warrick, 1965–1967, episodes 90–302, 435–436, 476, 480, 505–506)
Believed to be the mother of Steven Cord, but it turns out she adopted him. She works as the loyal housekeeper and confidant of Martin Peyton. When the truth about Steven's true parents comes out, she becomes depressed and leaves Peyton Place—after torching the Peyton mansion—but returns eventually, trying to manipulate the disposal of patriarch Martin Peyton's fortune.

Stella Chernak (Lee Grant, 1965–1966, episodes 104–199)
The daughter of Gus and older sister of Joe, who is hated by almost everyone in town because she is lying to the police, which is the cause of Rodney facing a jail sentence. Only Michael believes in her innocence and hires her as his personal assistant, until she confesses her lies, freeing Rodney before she leaves town for good.

John Fowler (John Kerr, 1965–1966, episodes 117–298)
Lawyer and husband of Marian, who is enraged when he finds out his wife considered having an affair. He is a district attorney who is determined to get Rodney Harrington behind bars. Elliot blames him for being too subjective, because, according to him, John hates the Harrington family because Leslie withholding evidence to clear Elliot caused his father, a previous DA, grief over having prosecuted an innocent man. (Kerr later became a lawyer in real life.)

Gus Chernak (Bruce Gordon, 1965–1966, episodes 117–177)
Alcoholic father of Joe and Stella who makes her daughter perjure herself. He hates the Harrington family ever since his removal from sensitive mill work because of his drinking, he is determined to take revenge on Martin Peyton's family.

Martin Peyton (George Macready, 1965–1968, episodes 133–363, 377–402, Wilfrid Hyde-White, 1967, episodes 364–376)
The father of Catherine Harrington and the most powerful and influential man in Peyton Place. Because of his bitter personality, his too-apparent passion for manipulating people like chess pieces, and his short temper, he is feared by most people. He bonds with Betty and wants her to be Rodney's wife, but his cover-ups for Catherine's immorality and Ann and Steven's true parentage come back to haunt him.

Marian Fowler (Joan Blackman, 1965–1966, episodes 133–191)
Wife of John Fowler, who was tempted to an affair with physical therapist Dr. Russ Gehring. She hit Allison with her car but did not stop to help and keeps the accident a secret instead. She also has marriage problems and eventually admits she has an affair.

Ann Howard (Susan Oliver, 1966, episodes 205–254)
Ann was believed to be the person who blinded Chris Webber. She is determined to prove her innocence and is supported by Michael. She turns out to be Catherine Harrington's daughter, twin sister of Steven, though in the middle of her turmoil she finds love with Michael until her own untimely death.

Lee Webber (Stephen Oliver, 1966–1968, episodes 206–400)
The brother of Chris and a bad seed thanks to boyhood abuse by his alcoholic father. He likes to beat his wife Sandy and regularly fights with Rodney. Ann blames him for having blinded Chris, which he eventually admits, but he was determined to do everything to silence her. After it has determined there is not enough evidence to prosecute him for Ann's death in a fall off the bluff, Lee is hired as Martin Peyton's chauffeur, unaware Peyton plans to hold him to account for Ann's death.

Sandy Webber (Lana Wood, 1966–1967, episodes 209–346, 404)
The wife of Lee who falls in love with Rodney. She is beaten up by her husband several times but does not want to leave him. She becomes a rival of Betty, because she is in love with Rodney as well, but in time she leaves Peyton Place for California.

Chris Webber (Gary Haynes, 1966–1967, episodes 224–312)
The brother of Lee who has been blind since he was a child. Ann tries to convince him she was not the one who blinded him, but Chris initially refuses to believe his own brother was responsible.

Rachel Welles (Leigh Taylor-Young, 1966–1967, episodes 276–354)
A teen who is abused by her uncle, Jack Chandler. She first seeks romantic involvement with Michael and moves in with the Carson family, but she is eventually abducted by her uncle and loses her mind, while her uncle is eventually arrested for other crimes and ultimately killed in a police confrontation.

Jack Chandler (John Kellogg, 1966–1967, episodes 289–357)
The uncle of Rachel who started to sexually abuse her after the death of his wife. He follows her to Peyton Place and, after blackmailing Leslie, abducts her. He is eventually arrested for another crime, escapes with Leslie's help, but dies in a later confrontation with police in another town.

Adrienne Van Leyden (Gena Rowlands, 1967, episodes 355–393)
Introduced as the widow of a prominent blood disease medical researcher, Adrienne becomes involved in Martin's plot to break Steven and Betty's marriage. She succeeds in seducing Steven while alienating most of the townspeople, but a revelation about her involvement in her late husband's suicide precedes her own death in an accidental fall.

Eddie Jacks (Dan Duryea, 1967–1968, episodes 363–429)
Estranged husband of Ada and father of Rita, who left his family behind when Rita was a kid. However, he is now determined to change his life. He re-establishes a relationship with daughter Rita, much to Ada's objection, until he's accused in Adrienne's death. Eventually his innocence in the crime is proven and Eddie eventually leaves town again—but not before helping arrange a shocking surprise for his daughter and son-in-law.

Jill Smith (Joyce Jillson, 1968, episodes 402–473)
The woman who claims to have Allison's child, causing Rodney Harrington to think he's the father. It turns out Jill herself is the mother of the child, with Michael's younger brother being the father.

Joe Rossi (Michael Christian, 1968, episodes 411–473)
The amoral, much-bruised younger brother of Michael who has a romantic history with Jill and agrees to help her with her scheme while wreaking havoc for others in town.

Jeff Kramer (John Findlater, 1968-1969)
Bandleader and keyboardist at The Shoreline. Friend of Lew Miles, and on-off boyfriend of Carolyn Russell. He represents the new generation of youth who is noncommital about romantic relationships.

Tom Winter (Robert Hogan, 1968–1969, episodes 419–514)
The husband of Susan. He works as a minister. He tries to convince his wife to end her alcoholism. When he fails that, and fears he's too ready to surrender to Jill's allure, Tom leaves the ministry to work on a fishing boat off the wharf and try to re-assemble his shattered life.

Susan Winter (Diana Hyland, 1968–1969, episodes 421–514)
The alcoholic wife of Tom. She has marriage problems, because she wants her husband to give up the church and refuses his attempts to end her addiction. After their divorce, Susan finds herself attracted somehow to Steven Cord, who is very wary of her manipulativeness.

Fred Russell (Joe Maross, 1968–1969, episodes 446–514)
Father of Carolyn and husband of Marsha, whose marriage ended over his philandering with younger women. His inability to accept his divorce and his ex-wife's planned new marriage to Michael drives him to desperation, including a brutal attempt to rape Marsha and threats against his former wife, until he is found dead.

Alma Miles (Ruby Dee, 1968–1969, episodes 467–514)
The wife of Harry and mother of Lew, who always has wonderful manners but also a quiet, resolute strength. She eventually becomes the parent in whom Lew confides his part in the tragedy.

Lew Miles (Glynn Turman, 1968–1969, episodes 469–514)
The son of Harry and Alma, who always has good grades in school and comes to wrestle with his racial realities. He is close to Carolyn despite her father's disapproval of his race, but he tries desperately to hide what proves his peripheral involvement in a tragic hit-and-run in New York.

Joanne Walker (Jeanne Buckley, 1968–1969)
Lew's girlfriend, and the daughter of police sergeant William Wilson Walker.

Sgt. William Walker (Morris Buchanan, 1966-1969)
Joanne's father, and Peyton Place police sergeant. He is a key witness in the hearing for Michael Rossi's murder charge.

Vicki Fletcher (Judy Pace, 1968–1969)
Lew's New York City friend. She follows him to Peyton Place to blackmail him into marrying her, in pursuit of socioeconomic upward mobility.

Maggie Riggs (Florida Friebus, 1968–1969)
An independent elderly widow who relocated from her farm to Peyton Place after the death of her husband. She eventually agrees to marry Eli Carson.

=== Minor characters played by recognizable actors ===
Thomas was Martin Peyton's chauffeur, originally portrayed by James Doohan from Star Trek in about a dozen episodes. Just one episode after Thomas leaves town on an errand, another Star Trek actor, Nichelle Nichols turns up for two episodes as Martin Peyton's nurse. Later, Doohan returned for an episode before the character Thomas was taken over by another actor.

Micky Dolenz of The Monkees, appeared in three episodes during the first season as Kitch Brunner, an archetypal teenage bad boy. He drugs Rita Jack's drink, and picks a fight with Norm Harrington.

Other notable guest stars; a recurring policeman character portrayed by Greg Morris, Dabbs Greer plays a member of the parole board who contemplates the release of Eliott Carson, and in the second and third seasons, Fred Crane plays Ralph Courtney, replacing the first season's pharmacist.

A future Academy Award-winning actor who had two brief appearances on the series was Richard Dreyfuss. In one early episode, he is seen dropping stacks of the newspaper The Clarion from the back of a delivery truck. In the episode in which Rodney and Allison are preparing to graduate from high school, he has dialogue as an annoyed student who has been waiting for them as they are the last ones to pick up their caps and gowns.

== Schedules ==
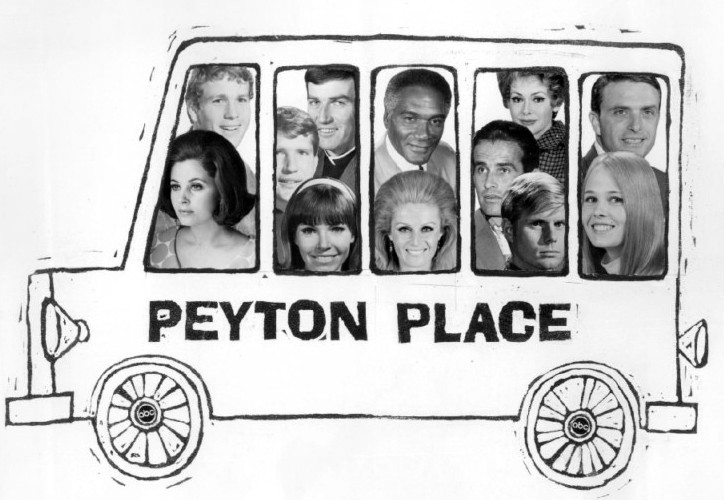
Promotional photo for the series' move to an earlier time slot.

When Peyton Place premiered in 1964, the show aired twice a week. Both installments were Top 20 hits in the Nielsen ratings, and this inspired ABC to air the show three times a week, starting in the summer of 1965. This move caused trouble for viewers who followed the show religiously, and many tuned out. The seasonal ratings for Peyton Place never rose into the Top 30 again and the serial's production reverted to two episodes a week. Beginning February 5, 1969, with it losing viewers with each episode, Peyton Place dropped its Wednesday installment and aired as one installment a week until its final episode on June 2. Its February 5 installment was replaced with a new sketch comedy series, Turn-On, which its writers jokingly dubbed as being "Peyton Replace". But that series would be cancelled after its first and only episode following negative reaction.

The series was one of the first seen on American network television to talk about sex and infidelity in a frank manner. As such, ABC executives would only allow the show to be aired at 9:30 p.m. Eastern/Pacific time, a time at which many children and teenagers were expected to be in bed. With the show in a ratings slump in 1968, it was moved to 8:30 p.m. in order to draw the viewers it once had shunned.

== Sequels ==
The series was revived as a daytime serial from April 3, 1972, to January 4, 1974, as Return to Peyton Place. Three of the actors from the primetime series reprised their roles on the daytime series – Frank Ferguson as Eli Carson, Patricia Morrow as Rita Harrington, and Evelyn Scott as Ada Jacks, while the rest of the characters were recast with new actors.

Two television movies followed, both only vaguely followed the original show's continuity. The first, Murder in Peyton Place was broadcast on NBC in the fall of 1977. Billed as a reunion movie it focused on the mysterious deaths of Rodney Harrington and Allison MacKenzie, as well as a diabolical plot of a powerful person to ruin the community. It reunited original cast members Dorothy Malone, Ed Nelson, Tim O'Connor, Joyce Jillson, and Christopher Connelly, while the rest of the returning characters were recast.

The second, Peyton Place: The Next Generation which aired in the spring of 1985 on NBC, was conceived as a one-shot sequel, that would hopefully revive the popular series and was therefore also promoted as a television pilot. It ignored the events of Murder in Peyton Place. Although a new series of the show never came to fruition, the film did reunite original cast members Dorothy Malone, Ed Nelson, Tim O'Connor, James Douglas, Christopher Connelly, Ruth Warrick and Barbara Parkins, who had declined to appear in Murder in Peyton Place.

=== Cast timeline ===
Color key
Main cast ("Starring" in opening credits)
Secondary cast ("Featuring" or "co-starring" in closing credits)
Guest cast (Guest star)

Role	Actor								
Role	Peyton Place					Return to Peyton Place		Murder in Peyton Place (1977)	Peyton Place: The Next Generation (1985)
Role	1964–65	1965–66	1966–67	1967–68	1968–69	1972	1973–74	Murder in Peyton Place (1977)	Peyton Place: The Next Generation (1985)
Constance MacKenzie	Dorothy Malone	Dorothy Malone	Dorothy Malone	Dorothy Malone		Bettye Ackerman		Dorothy Malone	Dorothy Malone
Constance MacKenzie		Lola Albright				Susan Brown	Susan Brown		
Matthew Swain	Warner Anderson								
Michael Rossi	Ed Nelson	Ed Nelson	Ed Nelson	Ed Nelson	Ed Nelson	Guy Stockwell	Guy Stockwell	Ed Nelson	Ed Nelson
Allison MacKenzie	Mia Farrow	Mia Farrow				Katherine Glass	Katherine Glass	Archive footage	Stand-in
Allison MacKenzie							Pamela Susan Shoop		
Rodney Harrington	Ryan O'Neal	Ryan O'Neal	Ryan O'Neal	Ryan O'Neal	Ryan O'Neal	Lawrence P. Casey		Mentioned	Mentioned
Rodney Harrington						Yale Summers	Yale Summers		
Betty Anderson	Barbara Parkins	Barbara Parkins	Barbara Parkins	Barbara Parkins	Barbara Parkins	Julie Parrish	Julie Parrish	Janet Margolin	Barbara Parkins
Betty Anderson							Lynn Loring		
Elliot Carson	Tim O'Connor	Tim O'Connor	Tim O'Connor	Tim O'Connor		Warren Stevens	Warren Stevens	Tim O'Connor	Tim O'Connor
Norman Harrington	Christopher Connelly	Christopher Connelly	Christopher Connelly	Christopher Connelly	Christopher Connelly	Ron Russell	Ron Russell	Christopher Connelly	Christopher Connelly
Rita Jacks	Patricia Morrow	Patricia Morrow	Patricia Morrow	Patricia Morrow	Patricia Morrow	Patricia Morrow	Patricia Morrow		Pat Morrow
Steven Cord	James Douglas	James Douglas	James Douglas	James Douglas	James Douglas	Joseph Gallison	Joseph Gallison	David Hedison	James Douglas
Carolyn Russell					Elizabeth Walker				
Marsha Russell					Barbara Rush				
Harry Miles					Percy Rodriguez				
Leslie Harrington	Paul Langton	Paul Langton	Paul Langton	Paul Langton		Stacy Harris	Stacy Harris		
Leslie Harrington							Frank Maxwell		
Eli Carson	Frank Ferguson	Frank Ferguson	Frank Ferguson	Frank Ferguson	Frank Ferguson	Frank Ferguson	Frank Ferguson		
Ada Jacks	Evelyn Scott	Evelyn Scott	Evelyn Scott	Evelyn Scott	Evelyn Scott	Evelyn Scott	Evelyn Scott		Evelyn Scott
Hannah Cord	Ruth Warrick	Ruth Warrick	Ruth Warrick	Ruth Warrick	Ruth Warrick	Mary K. Wells	Mary K. Wells		Ruth Warrick
Stella Chernak	Lee Grant	Lee Grant						Stella Stevens	
Jill Smith				Joyce Jillson	Joyce Jillson			Joyce Jillson	
Kelly Carson									Deborah Goodrich
Dana Harrington									Bruce Greenwood
Megan MacKenzie									Marguerite Hickey
Joey Harrington									Tony Quinn
Dorian Blake									John Beck

== Episodes ==
Season	Episodes	Originally released		Viewers (millions)
Season	Episodes	First released	Last released	Viewers (millions)
1	1–114	15 September 1964	10 September 1965	25.5
2	115–267	14 September 1965	7 September 1966	19.5
3	268–369	12 September 1966	7 September 1967	17.7
4	370–462	11 September 1967	11 September 1968	16.1
5	463–514	16 September 1968	2 June 1969	12.3

== Home media ==
The first 164 episodes, consisting of the first season and part of the second season, were released by Shout! Factory. As of 2018, five sets were released: the first two in 2009, and three more in 2018.

DVD name	Ep #	# of discs	Release date
Part 1	31 (1-31)	5	May 19, 2009
Part 2	34 (32–65)	5	July 14, 2009
Part 3	33 (66–98)	5	March 27, 2018
Part 4	33 (99–131)	5	June 26, 2018
Part 5	33 (132–164)	5	September 11, 2018

== Awards and nominations ==
=== Golden Globe Awards ===
Year	Category	Nominee(s)	Result	Ref.
1964	Best Television Star – Female	Dorothy Malone	Nominated	
1965	Best Television Star – Female	Mia Farrow	Nominated	
1965	Best Television Star – Female	Dorothy Malone	Nominated	

=== Primetime Emmy Awards ===
Year	Category	Nominee(s)	Result	Ref.
1966	Outstanding Continued Performance by an Actress in a Leading Role in a Dramatic Series	Barbara Parkins	Nominated	
1966	Outstanding Performance by an Actress in a Supporting Role in a Drama	Lee Grant	Won	
1967	Outstanding Performance by an Actress in a Supporting Role in a Drama	Ruth Warrick	Nominated	
