= Rachel Welles =

- Peyton Place character
- Portrayed by: Leigh Taylor-Young
- First appearance: October 10, 1966 (#276)
- Last appearance: July 18, 1967 (#354)
In-universe information
- Parents: Mr. Welles (deceased); Georgine (deceased)
- Aunts and uncles: Jack Chandler (uncle); Lucy Chandler (aunt)

Rachel Welles is a fictional character on the television drama Peyton Place. She was portrayed by actress Leigh Taylor-Young, between 1966 and 1967.

== Character history ==
Rachel is introduced as a mysterious and wild girl hiding in an abandoned cabin in the woods near Peyton Place. Norman Harrington and Rita Jacks find her and want to talk with her, but she is too afraid and struggles. When they notice that she is wearing a bracelet belonging to Allison MacKenzie, a young woman who has been missing for a while, they take her along to the Doctor's Hospital. There, the doctors soon notice that she reacts violently when people want to talk with her. They are unable to get information from her, which distresses Allison's father Elliot Carson, who is still heavily searching for his daughter.

Dr. Michael Rossi seems to be the only person she trusts. She confides in him that she was named Rachel, after the 'beautiful and well favoured' girl from Genesis 29:16,17. Despite giving him some facts from her life, including the fact that she has no parents and her birth date, she claims she does not remember her last name and her exact age, guessing it is either eighteen or nineteen years old. However, when he forces her to remember where she got Allison's bracelet, she blames him for being just as confrontational as anyone else. Not much later, she fully recovers from the sprained ankle she got during her struggle in the cabin. Dr. Rossi explains she cannot stay at the hospital and will be given over to juvenile authorities unless she tells him where she is from. She refuses to leave the hospital however, and accepts a job as a nurse. Dr. Rossi soon notices she is uncontrollable and therefore unequipped to work there. After being told she will be turned into the authorities, she locks herself into a room. Rita is able to win her trust and with her help, she is allowed to stay.

It is eventually revealed that Rachel's parents died in a fire when she was eight years old, while she at school. She was immediately taken home and witnessed the fire, which traumatized her. She went to live with her mother Georgine's sister Lucy and her new husband Jack Chandler in Hastings Valley. A neighbor visits Peyton Place to warn Dr. Rossi not to send her back to her uncle, claiming that he is abusive. She reveals that Rachel was beaten up by Jack several times.

== Production ==
In the summer of 1966, Mia Farrow was released from her American Broadcasting Company contract. Desperate, Fox, the show's studio, wrote the character of Rachel Welles into the show, who served as her replacement. Only on her third day in Los Angeles, Leigh Taylor-Young was arranged a meeting with producers for the part by her agent. She was asked to come back for an audition, during which she performed a scene of the play The Glass Menagerie by Tennessee Williams.

Shortly after, she was called back for a screen test. Taylor-Young hesitated to take the opportunity, because if she got the part, she would have to sign a seven-year contract. As her original plan was to go into the theatre, she was reluctant to commit herself to a TV series. Taylor-Young's mother finally convinced her to do the screen test, explaining that it would financially secure her and that it would be a good experience. She took the screen test on set during a shooting day, which meant that all the cast members were present when she started acting. The next day, she was given the part. She had a month to prepare and started shooting in August 1966.

Taylor-Young became a nationwide television star. She described that she lost all her anonymity and privacy.

Although having signed a seven-year contract, Taylor-Young left the show in July 1967, when she was seven months pregnant. Just like Farrow, she was abruptly written out of the series.
