= Janet Margolin =

American actress (1943–1993)

- Margolin in 1974
- Born: Janet Natalie Margolin; July 25, 1943; New York City, U.S.
- Died: December 17, 1993 (aged 50); Los Angeles, California, U.S.
- Resting place: Westwood Memorial Park
- Occupation: Actress
- Years active: 1961–1993
- Spouses: Jerry Brandt (m. 1968; div. 1971) Ted Wass (m. 1979)
- Children: 2 (including Julian Wass)

Janet Natalie Margolin (July 25, 1943 – December 17, 1993) was an American theater, television and film actress.

== Early life ==
Margolin was born in New York City to a Jewish family. Her father, Benjamin Margolin, was a Russian Jewish accountant who founded the Nephrosis Foundation, now the Kidney Foundation of New York, and her mother, Annette (née Lief), was a dental assistant. She stated in The Journal Register that she had been sent to a psychiatrist at the age of nine when discussing her role as Lisa Brandt in David and Lisa. Her father had many friends and clients who were associated with theater and would often ask her to audition for roles. Until the late 1950s, Margolin aspired to become a doctor, yet was always interested in acting and decided to give it a try following insistence from her father's friends.

She attended the High School of Performing Arts and, just prior to her graduation, did a screen test for Five Finger Exercise, where she was urged to sign a contract, but declined, instead returning to New York.

== Career ==
Margolin's earliest acting roles were in a commercial for Zest and several installments in the soap opera The Edge of Night. In 1961 at the age of 18, while a prop assistant at the New York Shakespeare Festival, Margolin won a pivotal Broadway stage role as Anna in Morris West's Daughter of Silence, beating 200 other applicants. Despite mixed reaction to the play, critics unanimously praised Margolin's performance and she went on to be nominated for a Tony Award. Her performance as Anna charmed director Frank Perry, Margolin was immediately cast to played her first movie role as the female lead in David and Lisaand traveled to Argentina in 1964 to feature in The Eavesdropper, where upon her return she signed a 1-film-a-year contract with 20th Century Fox. She co-starred with Marlon Brando in 1965's Morituri and with Steve McQueen in the western Nevada Smith.

By 1967, she was considered by the Baltimore Sun one of Hollywood's "brightest new stars," by then having featured in around five films. Numerous film studios made efforts to commit her to a long-term contract. Later that year, she also played Wanda in the movie Enter Laughing, as the love interest of the character David Kolowitz, played by Reni Santoni in his first leading role.

In Take the Money and Run (1969), she played the love interest of the bumbling thief played by Woody Allen, and in Annie Hall (1977), she played the social-climbing wife of Allen's character.

In 1979, Margolin co-starred with Roy Scheider in director Jonathan Demme's thriller Last Embrace.

Margolin's last film appearance was in Ghostbusters II in 1989, and her last television roles were in an episode of Murder, She Wrote ("Deadly Misunderstanding") and in Columbo: Murder in Malibu in 1990.

== Personal life ==
In August 1968, Margolin married Jerry Brandt in Los Angeles; they divorced in October 1971. Commenting on the marriage during a 1979 interview, Brandt said, "...being married to Janet was like being in the intensive care unit. In California she went to a shrink six days a week and I went three days. Finally, I said 'forget it.'"

In the early 1970s, Margolin had a brief relationship with David Geffen.

Margolin worked with Woody Allen in two films as (former) love interests, most notably Annie Hall. In a fake interview, Allen writes of working with Janet, stating in his own words: “ Occasionally I was forced to make love to her to get a decent performance. I did what I had to do in a businesslike way.”

Later that decade in December 1979, she married actor/director Ted Wass and had two children, including Julian Wass.

During the eighties and early nineties before Margolin's death, film role offers became scarcer, preventing continued mainstream success. She managed only small (usually guest) television roles.

Margolin frequently and erroneously has been identified as the sister of actor Stuart Margolin and director Arnold Margolin, though she acted alongside Stuart Margolin in the pilot episode of the TV series Lanigan's Rabbi, where they appeared as husband and wife. She was a friend of producer/actress Jennifer Salt, who had co-starred with Wass in the 1970s sitcom Soap.

== Death ==
Margolin died of ovarian cancer at the age of 50 on December 17, 1993, in her Los Angeles home. She was cremated and her ashes were placed in an urn garden at Westwood Memorial Park in Los Angeles.

== Filmography ==
Film
Year	Title	Role	Notes
1962	David and Lisa	Lisa Brandt	
1965	The Greatest Story Ever Told	Mary of Bethany	
1965	Bus Riley's Back in Town	Judy	
1965	Morituri	Esther	Alternative title: Saboteur: Code Name Morituri
1966	The Eavesdropper	Inés	Alternative title: El ojo que espía
1966	Nevada Smith	Neesa	
1967	Enter Laughing	Wanda	
1968	Buona Sera, Mrs. Campbell	Gia Campbell	
1969	Take the Money and Run	Louise	
1973	Your Three Minutes Are Up	Betty	
1977	Annie Hall	Robin	
1979	Last Embrace	Ellie Fabian	
1988	Distant Thunder	Barbara Lambert	
1989	Ghostbusters II	The Prosecutor	

Television
Year	Title	Role	Notes
1961	The Edge of Night	Betty Morrissey	August 17, 1961 episode
1962	Ben Casey	Illyana Trivas	Episode: "Legacy from a Stranger"
1962	Alcoa Premiere	Barbara	Episode: "The Hands of Danofrio"
1963	East Side/West Side	Doris Arno	Episode: "You Can't Beat the System"
1963	The Defenders	Dinah Caldwell	Episode: "Old Lady Ironsides"
1964	Arrest and Trial	Helen Kazar	Episode: "A Circle of Strangers"
1966	Ten Blocks on the Camino Real	Esmerelda	TV movie
1967	Coronet Blue	Riva	Episode: "The Assassins"
1971	Medical Center	Terri Spencer	Episode: "Web of Darkness"
1971	The Young Lawyers	Celia Bradbury	Episode: "The Bradbury War"
1971	The Interns	Rose	Episode: "The Manly Arts"
1971	The Last Child	Karen Miller	TV movie
1971	Owen Marshall: Counselor at Law	Jan Herron	Episode: "The Forest and the Trees"
1972	The Mod Squad	Cathy	Episode: "Eyes of the Beholder"
1972	Family Flight	Carol Rutledge	TV movie
1973-1975	Police Story	Various	3 episodes
1974	Pray for the Wildcats	Krissie Kincaid	TV movie
1974	Planet Earth	Harper-Smythe	TV movie
1974	Lucas Tanner	Zeta Alexander	Episode: "By the Numbers"
1975	The Wide World of Mystery	Susan Browning	Episode: "Please Call It Murder"
1975	Police Woman	Lisa Tibbett	Episode: "Pattern for Evil"
1975	S.W.A.T.	Emily	Episode: "Vigilante"
1976	Joe Forrester		Episode: "The Promised Land"
1976	Serpico	Helena	Episode: "The Serbian Connection"
1976-1977	Lanigan's Rabbi	Miriam Small	5 episodes
1977	Martinelli, Outside Man	Rosalie	TV movie
1977	Murder in Peyton Place	Betty Anderson Roerick	TV movie
1977	Sharon: Portrait of a Mistress	Carol	TV movie
1977	Starsky and Hutch	Dr. Judith Kaufman	2 episodes
1978	The Eddie Capra Mysteries	Daniella Stephans	Episode: "Nightmare at Pendragon Castle"
1979	The Triangle Factory Fire Scandal	Rose	TV movie
1980	The Plutonium Incident	Judith Longden	TV movie
1987	Tonight's the Night	Chris	TV movie
1990	Murder C.O.D.	Maye Walsh	TV movie
1990	Columbo	Theresa Goren	Episode: "Murder In Malibu"
1990	Murder, She Wrote	Rita Garrison	Episode: "Deadly Misunderstanding" (final appearance)

== Awards and nominations ==
Year	Award	Category	Title of work	Result
1962	Tony Award	Best Featured Actress in a Play	Daughter of Silence	Nominated
1962	Theatre World Award		Daughter of Silence	Won
1962	Venice International Film Festival	Best Actress	David and Lisa	Won
1963	Laurel Award	Top New Female Personality		5th place
1963	Golden Globe	Most Promising Newcomer - Female	David and Lisa	Nominated
1964	BAFTA Film Award	Most Promising Newcomer to Leading Film Roles	David and Lisa	Nominated
