= James Douglas (actor) =

American actor (1929–2016)

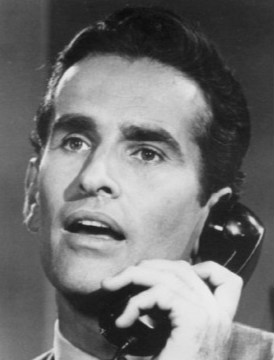
- Douglas as Steven Cord on Peyton Place
- Born: May 20, 1929; Los Angeles, California, U.S.
- Died: March 5, 2016 (aged 86); Bethlehem, Connecticut, U.S.
- Spouse: Dawn Busby Douglas
- Children: 2 daughters, 1 son

James Douglas (May 20, 1929 – March 5, 2016) was an American television actor. He was best known for his role as Grant Colman on As the World Turns.

== Biography ==
Born in Los Angeles, Douglas was the son of Stan Johnson, himself an actor. Johnson later became art director on Peyton Place, in which Douglas starred.

His first major role came in 1964 when he joined the cast of the prime time soap opera Peyton Place, playing the role of Steven Cord. He stayed with the series until it left the air in 1969.

Douglas then turned mainly to daytime roles, appearing as Elliott Carrington on Another World from 1972 to 1974. He then moved to As the World Turns, playing the role of Grant Colman #2. He also appeared on The Doctors, The Edge of Night in 1984 and on One Life to Live as Dr. Marcus Polk (1985–1987).

== Personal life ==
Douglas and his wife, the former Dawn Busby, had a son and two daughters.

== Filmography ==
- Dragnet - The Big Imposter' (1959) as Jay Wade Macken
- G.I. Blues (1960) as Rick
- A Thunder of Drums (1961) as Lt. Thomas Gresham
- Sweet Bird of Youth (1962) as Leroy
