= Stella Chernak =

- Peyton Place character
- Portrayed by: Lee Grant
- First appearance: August 19, 1965 (#104)
- Last appearance: March 28, 1966 (#199)
In-universe information
- Occupation: Biochemist (offscreen); Dr. Rossi's personal assistant (onscreen)
- Family: Gus Chernak (father) (deceased); Anna Chernak (mother); Joe Chernak (brother) (deceased)

Stella Chernak is a fictional character on the television drama Peyton Place. She was portrayed in over 60 episodes by Lee Grant, between 1965 and 1966.

== Character history ==
Stella Chernak grew up in the poor part of Peyton Place and was the favorite child of her alcoholic father, Gus. Although her little brother Joe spent most of his time in juvenile prison, she loved him very much and they were very close. In 1958, she left town and built up a promising career as a biochemist. She initially only comes to Peyton Place for a visit, but agrees to work as the assistant of Dr. Michael Rossi. They become very close to each other and even go out for a while.

When her brother Joe threatens Norman Harrington, his big brother Rodney Harrington visits Stella, looking for Joe. That same night, Joe is found dead at the wharf following a fight with Rodney. Stella is convinced Rodney murdered him and Gus, holding a grudge against the Harrington family, forces her to tell the police Rodney told her he was going to kill Joe. Rodney is soon charged with murder and Stella testifies against him. Rodney is a very popular person in town and almost everyone is convinced she is lying. Because of that, everybody starts to really dislike her. The only person who is still talking to her, is Michael.

After a while, Stella starts to feel guilty about possibly sending someone to jail over a lie and considers telling the truth. Meanwhile, Gus has been fired and tries to kill his boss and Rodney's grandfather Martin Peyton as revenge. However, he dies of a heart attack, before he can. In his final words he pushes Stella to get Rodney behind bars. She promises to make her father's wishes come true and keeps on lying. Rodney's lawyer Steven Cord digs into her past and contacts Richard Jensen, her former boyfriend with whom she stole fabricated documents. They were caught, however, but only he is sent to jail. Richard, out of jail after two years, swears revenge and forces Stella to break into the storage room of the hospital and steal morphine so he can sell it on the black market.

Stella is reluctant to do so, but she is too afraid of him. Right after breaking in, she feels guilty and admits the entire truth to Michael. He convinces her to tell the police her testimony was false. She is arrested, but Michael bails her out and she decides to leave town, swearing to never return.
