= Rodney Harrington =

- Peyton Place character
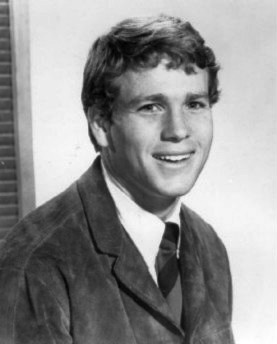
- Portrayed by: Ryan O'Neal
- First appearance: September 15, 1964 (# 1)
- Last appearance: March 3, 1969 (# 501)
In-universe information
- Occupation: Student (ending series)
- Parents: Leslie Harrington; Catherine Peyton (deceased)
- Siblings: Norman Harrington (brother); Rita Jacks (sister-in-law)
- Spouse: Betty Anderson
- Grandparents: Martin Peyton
- Aunts and uncles: Laura Brooks

Rodney "Rod" Harrington is a fictional character in the 1956 Grace Metalious novel Peyton Place, the 1957 film adaptation, and the 1960s television adaptation Peyton Place. He was portrayed by Barry Coe in the film, and by Ryan O'Neal in the TV series.

== Character history ==
=== Film version ===
In the film, Rodney is a popular guy at school who has a fling with Betty Anderson. They go to the 18th birthday party of Allison MacKenzie together. However, Rodney ends up kissing Allison. At the prom night, he wants to go with Betty. Betty's father demands he marry her. He is scared by this idea and decides to dump Betty for Allison.

During the summer, he chooses Betty above Allison. They marry, which angers Rodney's father Leslie Harrington. After the attack on Pearl Harbor, Rod enlists for the army and goes away. Later that month, it is announced Rod has died in the war.

=== Soap version ===
Rodney was introduced as the son of Leslie Harrington and Catherine Peyton and brother of Norman Harrington. He has a relationship with Betty, but he dumps her after he sees his father having an affair with Betty's mother, Julie Anderson. He next starts dating Allison for a short period, which angers Betty.

Betty reveals she's pregnant with Rodney's child. Rodney decides to marry her. They are involved in a car accident, in which Betty suffers a miscarriage. She doesn't tell Rod, as she is afraid he will leave her. When he finds out, he divorces her. He again starts dating Allison, but discovers he still loves Betty.

When his brother Norman starts dating Rita Jacks, her ex-boyfriend Joe Chernak starts stalking them. Rodney decides to help them out and starts a fight with him. Joe accidentally dies and Rod gets the blame. Despite the help of his powerful grandfather Martin Peyton, Rod is charged guilty. It is Stella Chernak who proves his innocence.

After this, Rodney decides to quit college to work in a garage. He ends his relationship with Allison and starts having a sexual relationship with Sandy Webber. He is also secretly in love with Rachel Welles. But Martin decides he should remarry Betty. He manipulates Rod into doing this. After he settled with her, he starts going into business with Norman and Rita.

At one point, Jill Smith enters town and claims she is having Allison's baby. Rodney is convinced he is the father and battles for custody. He eventually gets bored with his life and goes off for college, taking Betty with him.

== Harrington jacket ==
The character was often seen wearing a jacket made by a British company called Baracuta (the model was called the G9). His frequent appearances wearing the jacket resulted in it becoming known as a 'Harrington'; indeed, the style is still to this day manufactured worldwide by many different companies under this name.
