= Don Burgess (cinematographer) =

American cinematographer (born 1956)

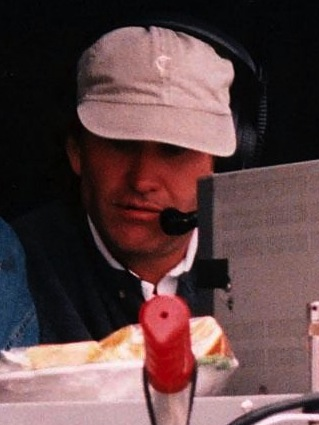
- Burgess on the set of Contact (1997).
- Born: Don Michael Burgess; May 28, 1956 (age 70); Santa Monica, California, U.S.
- Education: ArtCenter College of Design, BFA, Film 1982
- Years active: 1977–present

Don Michael Burgess, ASC (born May 28, 1956) is an American cinematographer, best known for his collaborations with director Robert Zemeckis.

He was nominated for the Academy Award and BAFTA Award for Best Cinematography for Zemeckis' Forrest Gump (1994). In 2024, he received the American Society of Cinematographers' Lifetime Achievement Award.

== Early life and education ==
Burgess comes from a family of builders, and initially wanted to be an architect in his youth.

His introduction to photography came through his father building a dark room for his sister since she was in a high school photography class at the time. When in high school he made ski movies and motorcycle movies.

He attended the ArtCenter College of Design in Pasadena, and cited nature documentarian Mike Hoover as an influence. While attending, he worked as a film loader on William Friedkin's Sorcerer (1977).

== Career ==
Burgess spent the first decade of his career shooting various independent and low-budget films, as well as nature documentaries for the National Geographic Channel. In 1987, he shot the full motion video game Night Trap, which was eventually released in 1992.

He was also a second unit cinematographer on Runaway Train (1985), Cherry 2000 (1986), and Back to the Future Part II (1989) and Part III (1990), which brought him into contact with Robert Zemeckis.

In 1994, Burgess was the main cinematographer on Zemeckis' Forrest Gump, earning Oscar and BAFTA Award nominations for his work. He has subsequently worked with Zemeckis on 10 films, including Contact (1997), Cast Away (2000), and The Polar Express (2004). His work with other directors includes Spider-Man (2002), Enchanted (2007), The Book of Eli (2010), Source Code (2011), The Muppets (2011), 42 (2013), The Conjuring 2 (2016), Aquaman (2018), and Aquaman and the Lost Kingdom (2023).

On March 3, 2024, Burgess received the Lifetime Achievement Award from the American Society of Cinematographers.

== Filmography ==
=== Film ===
Year	Title	Director	Notes
1980	Ruckus	Max Kleven	With Michael A. Jones
1985	Fury to Freedom	Erik Jacobson	
1986	The Night Stalker	Max Kleven	
1987	Summer Camp Nightmare	Bert L. Dragin	
1987	Death Before Dishonor	Terry Leonard	
1988	World Gone Wild	Lee H. Katzin	
1989	Under the Boardwalk	Fritz Kiersch	
1989	Blind Fury	Phillip Noyce	
1992	Mo' Money	Peter MacDonald	
1993	Josh and S.A.M.	Billy Weber	
1994	Forrest Gump	Robert Zemeckis	
1994	Richie Rich	Donald Petrie	
1995	Forget Paris	Billy Crystal	
1996	The Evening Star	Robert Harling	
1997	Contact	Robert Zemeckis	
2000	What Lies Beneath	Robert Zemeckis	
2000	Cast Away	Robert Zemeckis	
2002	Spider-Man	Sam Raimi	
2003	Terminator 3: Rise of the Machines	Jonathan Mostow	
2003	Radio	Michael Tollin	
2004	13 Going on 30	Gary Winick	
2004	The Polar Express	Robert Zemeckis	With Robert Presley
2004	Christmas with the Kranks	Joe Roth	
2006	Eight Below	Frank Marshall	
2006	My Super Ex-Girlfriend	Ivan Reitman	
2006	Alesh al-baher	Hakim Belabbes	With Guillaume Georget
2007	Enchanted	Kevin Lima	
2008	Fool's Gold	Andy Tennant	
2009	Aliens in the Attic	John Schultz	
2010	The Book of Eli	Hughes brothers	
2011	Source Code	Duncan Jones	
2011	Priest	Scott Stewart	
2011	The Muppets	James Bobin	
2012	Flight	Robert Zemeckis	
2013	42	Brian Helgeland	
2014	Muppets Most Wanted	James Bobin	
2016	The Conjuring 2	James Wan	
2016	Allied	Robert Zemeckis	
2016	Monster Trucks	Chris Wedge	
2017	Same Kind of Different as Me	Michael Carney	
2017	Wonder	Stephen Chbosky	
2018	The Christmas Chronicles	Clay Kaytis	
2018	Aquaman	James Wan	
2019	Sextuplets	Michael Tiddes	
2020	The Witches	Robert Zemeckis	
2020	The Christmas Chronicles 2	Chris Columbus	
2022	Pinocchio	Robert Zemeckis	
2023	Aquaman and the Lost Kingdom	James Wan	
2024	A Family Affair	Richard LaGravenese	
2024	Here	Robert Zemeckis	
2025	The Thursday Murder Club	Chris Columbus	

Video game

Year	Title	Director	Notes
1992	Night Trap	James Riley	Filmed in 1987

=== Television ===
TV movies

Year	Title	Director	Notes
1979	Superstunt II	Max Kleven	Documentary film
1988	Too Young the Hero	Buzz Kulik	
1989	Breaking Point	Peter Markle	
1990	The Court-Martial of Jackie Robinson	Larry Peerce	
1992	Two-Fisted Tales	Robert Zemeckis	Segment "Yellow"

TV series

Year	Title	Director	Notes
1982	National Geographic Specials	Aram Boyajian; Nicolas Noxon	Episode "The Sharks"
1988	ABC Afterschool Special	Gabrielle Beaumont	Episode "Tattle: When to Tell on a Friend"
1988	Something Is Out There	Larry Shaw	Episode "In His Own Image"
1991	Tales from the Crypt	Robert Zemeckis	Episode "Yellow"
1993	Space Rangers	Mikael Salomon	Episode "Fort Hope"

== Awards and nominations ==
Year	Award	Category	Title	Result
1990	American Society of Cinematographers	Outstanding Achievement in Cinematography in Motion Picture Made for Television	The Court-Martial of Jackie Robinson	Nominated
1994	Academy Awards	Best Cinematography	Forrest Gump	Nominated
1994	BAFTA Awards	Best Cinematography	Forrest Gump	Nominated
1994	American Society of Cinematographers	Outstanding Achievement in Cinematography	Forrest Gump	Nominated
1997	Satellite Awards	Best Cinematography	Contact	Nominated
2024	American Society of Cinematographers	Lifetime Achievement Award	—N/a	Won
