= The Night Stalker (1987 film) =

- Directed by: Max Kleven
- Written by: John F. Goff; Don Edmonds
- Produced by: Don Edmonds
- Starring: Charles Napier; Michelle Reese; Katherine Kelly Lang; Robert Viharo; Joseph Gian; Robert Z'Dar; Gary Crosby
- Cinematography: Don Burgess
- Edited by: Stanford C. Allen
- Music by: David Kitay; Richard Kosinski; Sam Winans
- Production company: Almi-Chrystie Productions
- Distributed by: Striker Productions
- Release date: 1987
- Running time: 91 minutes
- Country: United States
- Language: English

The Night Stalker is a 1987 American thriller film starring Charles Napier. The story was inspired by serial killer Richard Ramirez also known as "The Night Stalker".

== Plot ==
Sergeant J.J. Striker, a hard-drinking cop, teams up with a hooker to track down a serial killer that kills prostitutes and paints Chinese symbols on his victims.

== Cast ==
- Charles Napier as J.J. Striker
- Michelle Reese as Rene
- Katherine Kelly Lang as Denise
- Robert Viharo as Charlie Garrett
- Joseph Gian as Detective Buddy Brown
- Robert Z'Dar as Chuck Sommers
- Gary Crosby as Vic Gallagher
- Diane Sommerfield as Louise Roberts
- Joan Chen as Mai Wing
- John F. Goff as Captain
- Ola Ray as Sable Fox
- Roy Jenson as Cook
