= Carol Lynley filmography =

American actress filmography

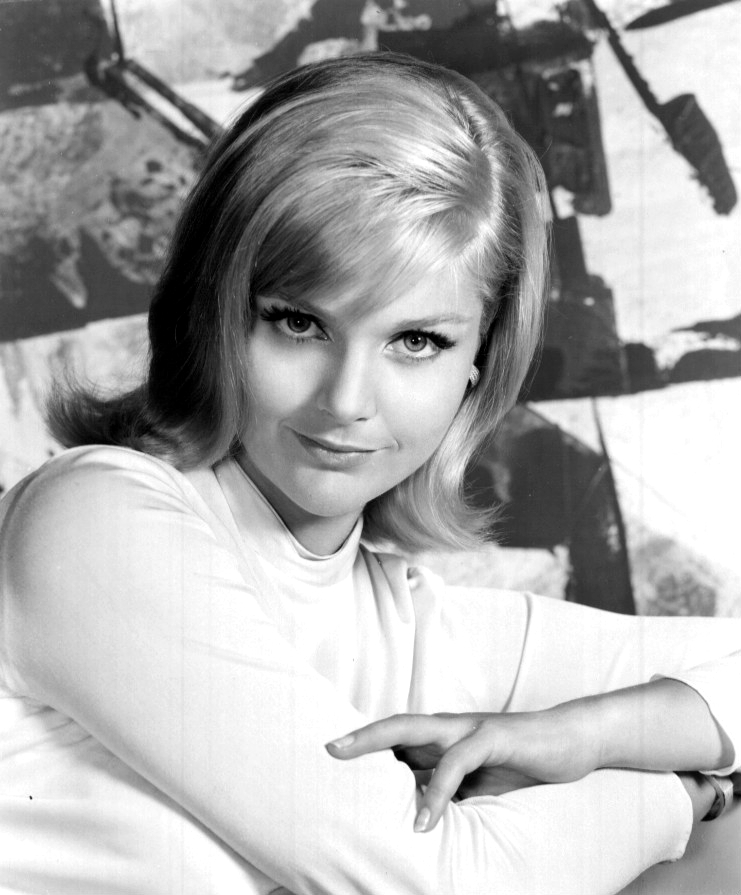
Lynley in 1965

Carol Lynley (born Carole Ann Jones; February 13, 1942 – September 3, 2019) was an American actress and child model. She is known for her roles in the films The Poseidon Adventure (1972) and Blue Denim.

Lynley was born Carole Ann Jones in Manhattan, to an Irish father and New England mother. She began her career at the age of 15 as a child model appearing on the April 22, 1957, cover of Life. She won the Theatre World Award as "one of the most promising personalities for 1956-57" for her performance in The Potting Shed. She started her film career in 1958 with the Disney's film The Light in the Forest followed by Holiday for Lovers (1959) and Blue Denim (1959). In 1959, Lynley was nominated for the Golden Globe Award for Most Promising Newcomer – Female for the film The Light in the Forest. In 1960 she was again nominated for the Golden Globe Award for Most Promising Newcomer – Female for the film Blue Denim.

== Filmography ==
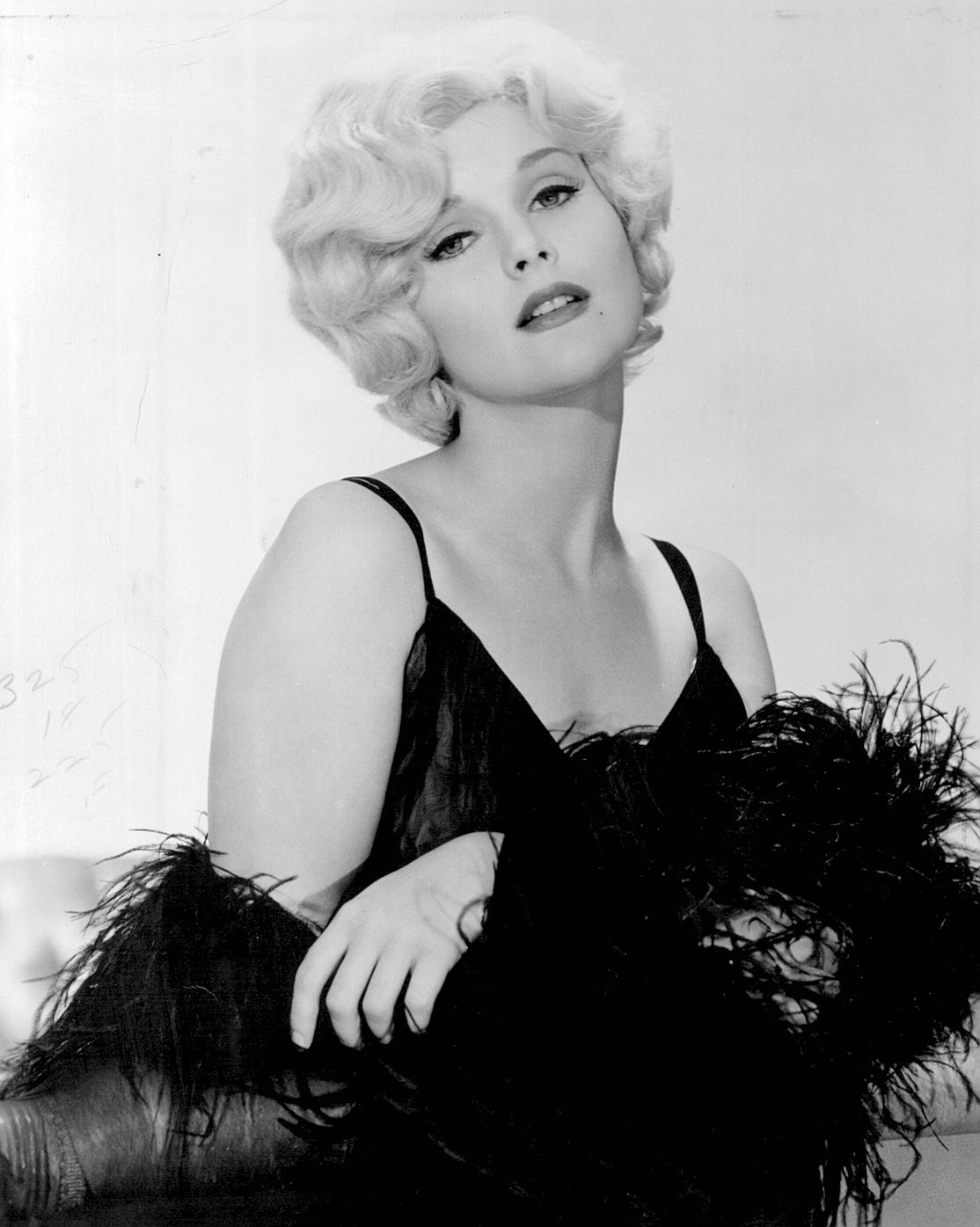
Lynley as Jean Harlow in the film Harlow (1965)

=== Film ===
Year	Title	Role	Notes
1958	The Light in the Forest	Shenandoe	
1959	Holiday for Lovers	Betsy Dean	
1959	Blue Denim	Janet Willard	
1959	Hound-Dog Man	Dony Wallace	
1961	Return to Peyton Place	Allison	
1961	The Last Sunset	Melissa 'Missy' Breckenridge	
1963	The Stripper	Miriam Caswell	
1963	Under the Yum Yum Tree	Robin Austin	
1963	The Cardinal	Mona / Regina Fermoyle	
1964	Shock Treatment	Cynthia Lee Albright	
1964	The Pleasure Seekers	Maggie Williams	
1965	Harlow	Jean Harlow	
1965	Bunny Lake Is Missing	Ann Lake	
1967	The Shuttered Room	Susannah Whately Kelton / Sarah	
1967	Danger Route	Jocelyn	
1968	Shadow on the Land	Abigail 'Abby' Tyler	TV movie
1968	The Smugglers	Jo Hudson	TV movie
1969	The Maltese Bippy	Robin Sherwood	
1969	Once You Kiss a Stranger	Diana	
1970	Norwood	Yvonne Phillips	
1970	Weekend of Terror	Sister Meredith	TV movie
1971	Crosscurrent	Kathy Cooper	TV movie
1972	The Night Stalker	Gail Foster	TV movie
1972	Beware! The Blob	Leslie	
1972	The Poseidon Adventure	Nonnie Parry	
1973	Cotter	Leah	
1974	The Elevator	Irene Turner	TV movie
1975	Death Stalk	Cathy Webster	TV movie
1975	The Four Deuces	Wendy Rittenhouse	
1976	Flood!	Abbie Adams	TV movie
1977	The Washington Affair	Barbara Nicholson	
1977	Bad Georgia Road	Molly Golden	
1977	Having Babies II	Sally Magee	TV movie
1978	Cops and Robin	Dr. Alice Alcott	TV movie
1978	The Beasts Are on the Streets	Dr. Claire McCauley	TV movie
1978	The Cat and the Canary	Annabelle West	
1979	H. G. Wells' The Shape of Things to Come	Nikki	
1980	Willow B: Women in Prison	Claire Hastings	TV movie
1981	Best of Friends	Marge Adams	TV movie
1981	Judgment Day	Harriet Egan	TV movie
1983	Vigilante	Assistant D.A. Mary Fletcher	
1983	Balboa	Erin Blakely	
1987	Dark Tower	Tilly Ambrose	
1988	Blackout	Esther Boyle	
1990	Spirits	Sister Jillian	
1991	Howling VI: The Freaks	Miss Eddington	
1996	Neon Signs	Faith	
1997	Flypaper	Housewife in Kitchen	uncredited
1999	Drowning on Dry Land	Marge	
2003	A Light in the Forest	Gramma Irene	(no connection with the 1958 movie)
2006	Vic	Carrie Lee	short film

=== Television ===
Year	Title	Roles	Episode
1956	Goodyear Television Playhouse		"Grow Up"
1956	The Alcoa Hour	Setsu	"The Big Wave"
1956	The Kaiser Aluminum Hour		"Cracker Money"
1956	General Electric Theatre	Schoolgirl	"The Hat With the Roses", uncredited
1957	Alfred Hitchcock Presents	Janice	"The Young One"
1957	DuPont Show of the Month	Judy Graves	Junior Miss (TV film)
1958	Pursuit	Elaine Hermann	"The Vengeance"
1958	Shirley Temple's Storybook	Rapunzel	"Rapunzel"
1958	General Electric Theatre	Mary Elizabeth Asher	"The Young and Scared"
1959	General Electric Theatre	Barbara Clark	"Deed of Mercy"
1959	General Electric Theatre	Phyllis	"The Last Dance"
1962	The Alfred Hitchcock Hour	Sister Pamela Wiley	"Final Vow"
1962	Alcoa Premiere	Sandy Carter	"Whatever Happened to Miss Illinois?"
1962	The Virginian	Judith Morrow	"The Man from the Sea"
1963	The Dick Powell Show	Elise	"The Rage of Silence"
1963-1973	The Tonight Show Starring Johnny Carson	Herself	7 episodes
1965	Bob Hope Presents the Chrysler Theatre	Irene Ayers	"The Fliers"
1965-1971	The Merv Griffin Show	Herself	2 episodes
1966	Run for Your Life	April Martin	"In Search of April"
1966	Bob Hope Presents the Chrysler Theatre	Miranda Woodland	"Runaway Boy"
1967	The Man from U.N.C.L.E.	Annie Justin	"The Prince of Darkness", (parts 1 and 2)
1967	The Invaders	Elyse Reynolds	"The Believers"
1967	The F.B.I.	Lynn Hallett	"False Witness"
1967-1979	Hollywood Squares	Herself	10 episodes
1968	Journey to the Unknown	Eve	"Eve"
1968	The Big Valley	Dilly Shanks	"Hell Hath No Fury"
1968	The Joey Bishop Show	Herself	1 episode
1969	It Takes a Thief	Michelle	"Boom at the Top"
1969–1970	The Immortal	Sylvia Cartwright	TV series, episodes: "Pilot" (1969) and "Sylvia" (1970)
1970	The Bold Ones: The New Doctors	Judith Walters	"Giants Never Kneel"
1970	The Most Deadly Game	Brooke	"Who Killed Kindness?"
1971	Mannix	Dorothy Kinman	"Voice in the Dark"
1972	Night Gallery	Jenny Tarraday	"The Waiting Room/Last Rites for a Dead Druid"
1972	The Sixth Sense	Gail Sumner	"The House That Cried Murder"
1972-1978	The Mike Douglas Show	Herself	2 episodes
1973	Orson Welles Great Mysteries	Elizabeth Ann Zachary	"Death of an Old-Fashioned Girl"
1974	The Magician	Janet Keegan	"The Illusion of the Curious Counterfeit" (parts 1 and 2)
1974	The Evil Touch	Cora	TV series, episodes: "Death by Drowning" and "Dear Cora I'm Going to Kill You"
1975	Thriller	Suzy Martin	"If It's a Man, Hang Up"
1976	Quincy M.E.	Lynn Dressler	"Who's Who in Neverland"
1976	Police Woman	Nina Daniels	"Trial by Prejudice"
1977	Kojak	Polly Ames	"Kiss It All Goodbye"
1977–1984	Fantasy Island	various characters	TV series, 11 episodes
1978	Hawaii Five-O	Karen Baker/Valerie Bates	"Angel in Blue"
1978	Sword of Justice	Cyndy Rupert	"The Skywayman"
1979	The Love Boat	Carol Gilmore	"Dream Ship/Best of Friends/Aftermath"
1980	The Littlest Hobo	June Wilson	"Mystery at the Zoo"
1980	Charlie's Angels	Lisa Gallo	"Island Angels"
1981	Hart to Hart	Ann Marie Drake	"Hartland Express"
1983	The Fall Guy	Ivy Morris	"Pleasure Isle"
1983	Hotel	Zane Elliott	"Faith, Hope and Charity"
1984	Tales of the Unexpected	Elizabeth	"The Gift of Beauty"
1984	Finder of Lost Loves	Karen Davis	"Forgotten Melodies"
1985	Fox Mystery Theater/A.K.A. Hammer House of Mystery and Suspense	Sylvia Daly	"In Possession"
1987	Night Heat	Grace Barnett	"Grace"
1989	Another World	Judge Martha Dunlay	2 episodes
1990	Monsters	Dr. Elizabeth Porter	"Stressed Environment"
