= Ruckus (film) =

1980 film

- Directed by: Max Kleven
- Written by: Max Kleven
- Produced by: Paul Maslansky
- Starring: Dirk Benedict; Linda Blair; Richard Farnsworth; Matt Clark; Jon Van Ness; Ben Johnson
- Cinematography: Don Burgess; Michael A. Jones
- Edited by: Angelo Bernarducci
- Music by: Tommy Vig
- Distributed by: New World Pictures
- Release date: July 25, 1980
- Running time: 93 minutes
- Country: United States
- Language: English

Ruckus is a 1980 American action thriller film written and directed by Max Kleven, and starring Dirk Benedict and Linda Blair. Its plot follows an unstable Vietnam War veteran who wages war against his oppressors in a Southern small town. It was also released under several alternate titles, including Ruckus in Madoc County, The Loner, and Eat My Smoke.

== Plot ==
In Madoc County, Alabama, Kyle Hanson is an emotionally bruised veteran of the Vietnam War who finds himself unable to rejoin mainstream society and lives as a drifter. While stopping in town to eat, local bullies begin harassing him. This culminates in a violent altercation with redneck Homer, after which Kyle flees.

Relying on his special forces training, he manages to evade pursuing deputies. Kyle spends the night in a barn at the home of Jenny Bellows, a young mother whose husband went missing-in-action in Vietnam and is presumed dead. Jenny resides with her son Bobby and father-in-law Sam Bellows, the wealthiest man in town. In the morning, after Sam leaves on a business trip, Jenny encounters Kyle, who walks into the home uninvited. Having heard of the altercation the day before and the rumor that he is dangerous, Jenny is initially frightened, but she is soon sympathetic to Kyle.

Sheriff Jethro Pough learns that Kyle was previously incarcerated in a military psychiatric hospital during his service and was catatonic for over a year. Several local men plan to hunt Kyle and eject him from the community, led by the imperious Deputy Dave. After evading several townspeople by fleeing into the woods, Kyle rejoins Jenny, and they ride motorcycles together. She invites him into her home and offers to wash his clothes and allow him to bathe. Some townsmen and local law enforcement stalk the house, having trailed Kyle there. Kyle manages to thwart their attempt at capturing him by causing their cars to explode and stealing a truck. Following a high-speed chase, Kyle crashes the truck into a river, but he escapes, leading the townsmen to believe he is dead. However, they are unable to find his body.

Kyle returns to Jenny's home, where she reveals to him that Sheriff Pough has just informed her that the military has confirmed her husband as deceased. Later that night, Kyle accompanies Jenny and Bobby to the local fair, where they spend the evening at the carnival. Cece, a local farmer, spots Kyle with Jenny and calls Deputy Dave. The two men assail him at the carnival and kidnap him while Jenny takes Bobby to the bathroom. The men bring him to Homer's farm, where they hold him hostage in a grain elevator.

Locked in a cage, Kyle suffers posttraumatic stress disorder flashbacks to his time in Vietnam. The following morning, Deputy Dave brings a large gathering of men to the grain elevator to harass and beat Kyle. They attempt to wage a fight with him, but Kyle beats several of the men before leaping from the top of the grain elevator into a river below.

The townsmen attempt to find Kyle in the water, but he hides beneath the surface to evade them. He steals a boat and is swiftly pursued by the men in two boats. Jenny hears gunfire from the river. She picks up Sam and Sheriff Pough from her house to bring them to the scene. Using liquor bottles found in his boat, Kyle fashions molotov cocktails, which he hurls at his attackers from the shore, causing their boats to explode and leaving them stranded on a small island in the river.

Kyle is pursued on the island by the men, though Cece is now fearful of him. Kyle camouflages himself with mud and terrorizes his attackers with a number of traps and makeshift weapons, instilling fear in all of them. Jenny, Sam, and Sheriff Pough arrive as all of Kyle's attackers flee fearfully into the river. Sam, having been informed by Jenny that Kyle is harmless, declares that Kyle may stay on the river island and have it as his own. Jenny looks on fondly as Kyle washes the mud from himself in the water.

== Cast ==
- Dirk Benedict as Kyle Hanson, an emotionally scarred & withdrawn Vietnam veteran who finds himself shunned by society. The protagonist of the film, he finds himself accosted by local bullies in a small town
- Linda Blair as Jenny Bellows, the daughter-in-law of Sam Bellows and mother of Bobby Bellows. Jenny is one of the few people in town who assist Hanson, with Jenny finding herself attracted to him as well
- Richard Farnsworth as Sheriff Jethro Pough, the town sheriff who reluctantly tries to arrest Hanson, both for his own safety and for his supposed "crimes".
- Ben Johnson as Sam Bellows, the richest man in town and Jenny's father-in-law. Bellows lost his son (Jenny's husband) in the war, yet continues to hope that he will return
- Matt Clark as Cece, a local farmer and bully who hunts Kyle
- Jon Van Ness as Deputy Dave, a local deputy who bonds together with the local townsmen to pursue Kyle
- Bobby Hughes as Bobby Bellows

== Release ==
The film was first released in July 1980 under the title Ruckus in Madoc County. The following month, in August 1980, it was released in some U.S. cities under the alternate title The Loner. Other alternate titles included Eat My Smoke.

=== Home media ===
Paragon Home Video released the film under the Ruckus title on VHS in 1983. Anchor Bay Entertainment released it on DVD in 2000, reissuing it with an alternate cover art in 2002.

== Similarities to First Blood ==
Ruckus was released two years before First Blood, but there are numerous similarities between the films. The original rights for David Morell's novel went through 10 years of passing hands before culminating in the 1982 film.
