= Peter Parros =

American actor

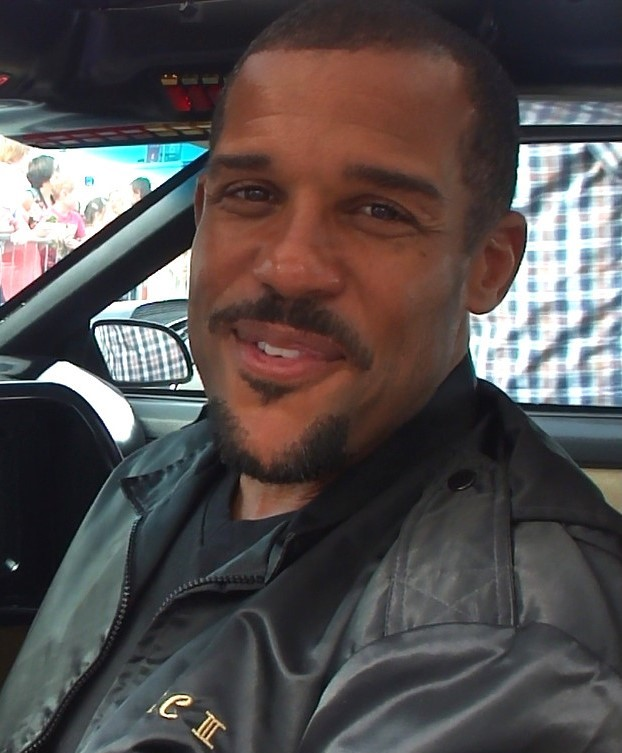
- Parros in 2012
- Born: November 11, 1960 (age 66); Brooklyn, New York, U.S.
- Occupation: Actor
- Years active: 1984–present
- Spouse: Jerri Morgan (m. 1985; div. 2015)
- Children: 2

Peter Parros (born November 11, 1960) is an American television actor and screenwriter. His acting credits include stage, screen and television. Parros portrays Judge David Harrington on Tyler Perry's The Haves and the Have Nots airing on the Oprah Winfrey Network, but he may be most recognized for his nearly decade-long portrayal of Dr. Ben Harris on the CBS soap As the World Turns.

== Biography ==
=== Early life ===
Peter Parros was born in Brooklyn, New York, but grew up in Los Angeles and Salt Lake City. He became interested in acting and the film industry after holding a job with a company that created special effects miniatures. When interviewed, he referred to the initial stages of his acting endeavor as being completely different than what other actors and actresses found. He said, "What drew me in wasn't the Shakespearean quality of acting. I was going to be the Black Arnold Schwarzenegger."

=== Career ===
Initially, Parros acted solely in theater. Eventually, he found minor success on screen. In 1984, Parros landed his first television role as Michael, Tootie's cousin, in The Facts of Life. His first regular series role was on Knight Rider in 1985, playing "RC3", a.k.a. Reginald Cornelius III, the semi truck driver (and sometime partner to Michael Knight) who also worked on KITT; he appeared in the fourth and final season of the series. Knight Rider has appeared in syndication in over 200 countries throughout the world, most notably in Australia, Canada, Germany, and the United Kingdom.

Thereafter, Parros was cast in several popular American soap operas. He appeared on The Young and the Restless in the recurring role of Leo Baines from 1986 to 1987, Santa Barbara in 1992, One Life to Live as the second Dr. Ben Price from 1994 until 1995, and on As the World Turns as Dr. Benjamin "Ben" Robert Harris from 1996 to 2005. Parros also starred in the short-lived The New Adam-12, a spin-off of the 1960s/1970s popular police drama Adam-12, as Officer Gus Grant. In 1990–91, he played the recurring role of firefighter Eddie Cooper on the CBS comedy The Family Man. Parros most recently in Tyler Perry’s The Haves and the Have Nots, a hit show for Oprah Winfrey’s OWN Channel.

Parros has made guest appearances on such TV shows as Charles in Charge, Star Trek: The Next Generation, and New York Undercover.

== Filmography ==
=== Film ===
Year	Title	Role	Notes
1985	Real Genius	Air Force SP at Gate	
1986	A Little Off Mark	Mark	
1987	Death Before Dishonor	James	
2007	The Weekend	Jacob's Dad	
2017	Our Dream Christmas	Marshall Carter	
2019	Rim of the World	Dariush's Dad	
2023	The Final Say	Pastor Terry	

=== Television ===
Year	Title	Role	Notes
1984	The Facts of Life	Michael	Episode: "Crossing the Line"
1985	Anything for Love	2nd Waiter	Unsold pilot
1985–1986	Knight Rider	'RC3' Reginald Cornelius III	21 episodes
1985–1989	Charles in Charge	Eugene / Eddie Dootabuta	2 episodes
1986	The Young and the Restless	Leo Baines	10 episodes
1988	Ladykillers	Zak	Television film
1989	Studio 5-B		Episode: "The Aftermath"
1989	Star Trek: The Next Generation	Tactics Officer	Episode: "A Matter of Honor"
1989	227	Pizza Man	Episode: "The Bet"
1989	1st & Ten		Episode: "Final Bow"
1990-1991	The New Adam-12	Officer Gus Grant	42 episodes
1990	The Court-Martial of Jackie Robinson	Gordon Jones	Television film
1990	The Family Man	Eddie Cooper	3 episodes
1992	Santa Barbara	Dane	9 episodes
1992	Seinfeld	Officer #2	Episode: "The Trip: Part 2"
1993	Hangin' with Mr. Cooper	Troy	Episode: "Unforgettable"
1994	Step by Step	George	Episode: "Pretty Woman"
1994–1995	One Life to Live	Dr. Ben Price	12 episodes
1996	New York Undercover	Stan	Episode: "A Time to Kill"
1996–2005, 2009	As the World Turns	Benjamin "Ben" Robert Harris	41 episodes Nominated—Image Award (2000, 2003); Nominated—Soap Opera Digest Awards (1998)
2005	CSI: Miami	James Johnson	Episode: "Felony Flight"
2007	Bones	Officer at Scene	Episode: "The Man at the Mansion"
2008	Law & Order	Judge Matthew Alden	2 episodes
2009	Sherri	William	Episode: "Lost Weekend"
2010	Royal Pains	Ted Phillips	Episode: "Big Whoop"
2011	Castle	Dr. Rex Colabro	Episode: "The Dead Pool"
2013–2021	The Haves and the Have Nots	David Harrington	113 episodes
2018	Scorpion	Chief Benavidez	Episode: "Nerd, Wind & Fire"
2019	Lethal Weapon	FBI Agent Ross	Episode: "The Spy Who Loved Me"
