= Death Before Dishonor (film) =

1987 film by Terry Leonard

- Theatrical release poster
- Directed by: Terry J. Leonard
- Written by: John Gatliff
- Produced by: Lawrence Kubik
- Starring: Fred Dryer; Brian Keith; Joanna Pacuła; Paul Winfield
- Cinematography: Don Burgess
- Edited by: Steve Mirkovich
- Music by: Brian May
- Distributed by: New World Pictures
- Release date: February 20, 1987
- Running time: 91 minutes
- Country: United States
- Language: English
- Budget: $5 million
- Box office: $4,546,244

Death Before Dishonor is a 1987 American action film directed by Terry J. Leonard.

== Plot ==
Gunnery Sergeant Burns is in charge of the Marine Security Guard detachment at a United States embassy in the Middle East. When terrorists attack the compound, taking hostages, Burns becomes a one-man Marine Corps in an attempt to rescue the hostages and kill the terrorists.

== Cast ==
- Fred Dryer as Gunnery Sergeant Jack Burns
- Brian Keith as Colonel Halloran
- Kasey Walker as Maude
- Joanna Pacula as Elli
- Joseph Gian as Sergeant Manuel Ramirez
- Sasha Mitchell as Ruggieri
- Peter Parros as James
- Paul Winfield as The Ambassador
- Rockne Tarkington as "Jihad"
- Dan Chodos as Amin
- Mohammad Bakri as Gavril
- Chaim Girafi as Zabib
- Tuvia Tavi as Elias
- Yossi Ashdot as Hamed

== Production ==
Death Before Dishonor marked the directorial debut for Terry J. Leonard, who was primarily known for his stunt work, but had also served as a second unit director for several feature films and television shows. The film was originally scheduled to shoot in Yugoslavia, but producer Lawrence Kubik received a telephone call warning him not to come to Yugoslavia, consequently, the location was moved to Israel, where production costs were lower. The film shot in Tel Aviv, Jerusalem and Jaffa.

== Reception ==
Audiences polled by CinemaScore gave the film an average grade of "B-" on an A+ to F scale.

== Novelization ==
A paperback novelization of the film, written by Kevin Randle, was published in 1987.

== Home media ==
The film was released on DVD on April 17, 2001, by Anchor Bay Entertainment.
