= Adam-12 =

American police procedural television series (1968–1975)

- Genre: Police procedural
- Created by: Robert A. Cinader; Jack Webb
- Starring: Martin Milner; Kent McCord
- Composer: Frank Comstock
- Country of origin: United States
- Original language: English
- No. of seasons: 7
- No. of episodes: 174 (list of episodes)

Production
- Executive producer: Jack Webb
- Producers: Robert A. Cinader; Edward K. Dodds
- Running time: 30 minutes
- Production companies: Mark VII Limited; Universal Television

Original release
- Network: NBC
- Release: September 21, 1968 – May 20, 1975

Related
- Adam-12 (1990 TV series)

Adam-12 is an American police procedural crime drama television series created by Robert A. Cinader and Jack Webb and produced by Mark VII Limited and Universal Television. The series follows Los Angeles Police Department (LAPD) officers Pete Malloy and Jim Reed as they patrol Los Angeles in their police cruiser, assigned the call sign "1-Adam-12". Adam-12 stars Martin Milner and Kent McCord, with several recurring co-stars, the most frequent being William Boyett and Gary Crosby. The series ran over seven seasons from September 21, 1968, until May 20, 1975, airing 174 episodes.

Like Webb's other series, Dragnet and Emergency!, Adam-12 was produced in cooperation with the actual department it was based on; in this case, the LAPD. Adam-12 aimed to be realistic in its depiction of policing and helped familiarize the American public with police procedures and jargon. A syndicated revival by The Arthur Company aired from 1990 to 1991 for two seasons, featuring new characters and an updated setting.

== Premise ==
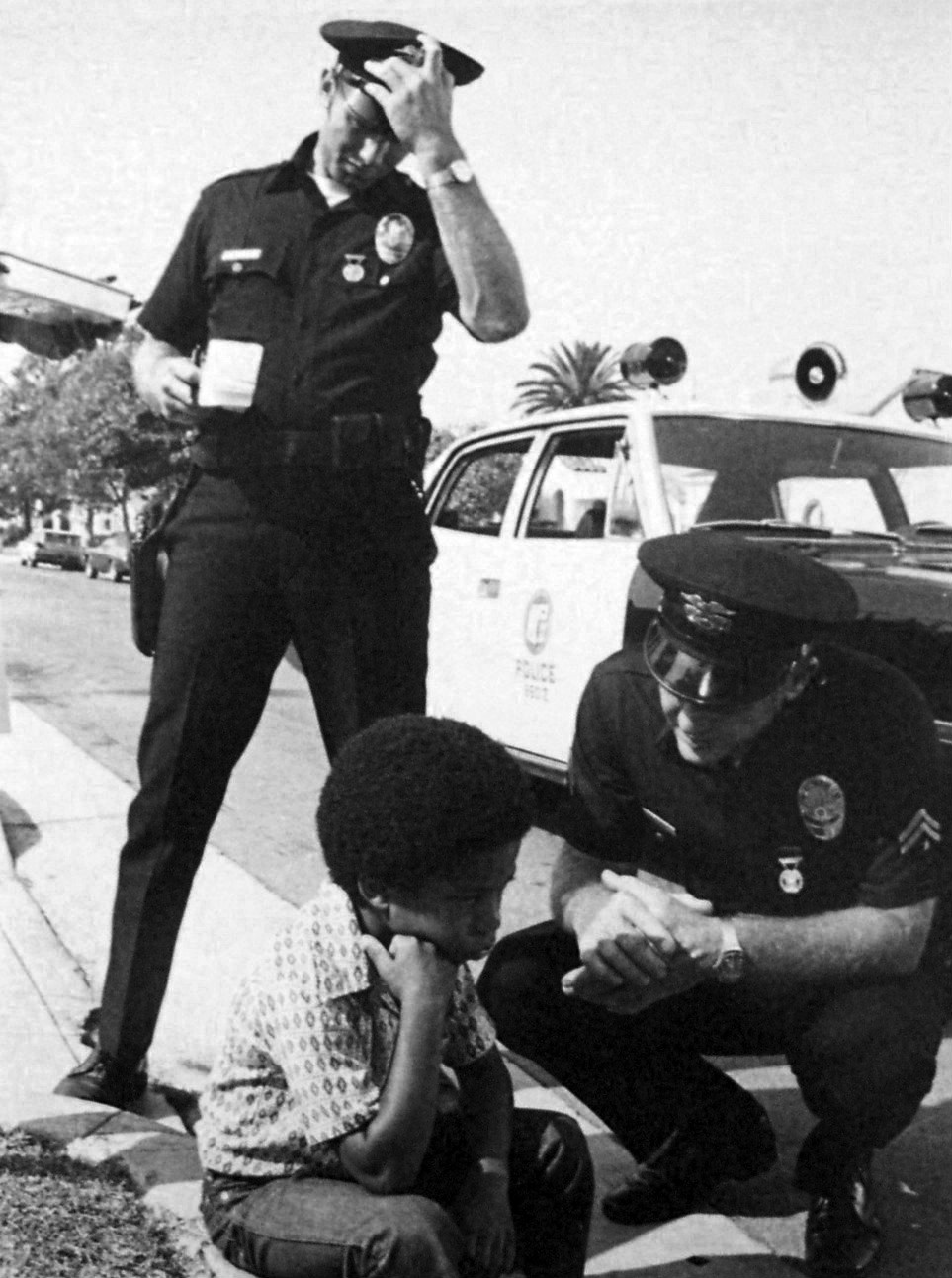
A scene from an episode in which Malloy and Reed comfort a boy whose sister was the victim of a hit-and-run driver

Set in the Los Angeles Police Department's Central Division, Adam-12 follows police officers Pete Malloy (Martin Milner) and Jim Reed (Kent McCord) as they patrol Los Angeles. The plots of most episodes follow Malloy and Reed as they handle the various calls for service that they are assigned to or come across, ranging from intense incidents such as pursuits, standoffs, shootouts, hostage-takings, gang violence, terrorism, and undercover assignments, to the mundane (and far more common) routine happenings like traffic stops, disputes, disturbances, narcotics crimes, DUI arrests, fights, and thefts.

At the start of the series, Malloy, intending to resign after the death of his previous partner, is assigned to field train Reed, an inexperienced rookie. After Reed disobeys Malloy's orders but singlehandedly arrests a group of armed suspects during a high-risk shooting call, Malloy sees potential in Reed and decides to remain on the force to guide him through his nine-month probationary period. The first and second seasons are not chronological, with Reed's stated time in the LAPD varying in each episode.

Starting with the third season, the series was organized chronologically, and Reed completed his probationary period, with him and Malloy remaining partners. Throughout the series, and especially in later seasons, Malloy and Reed began patrolling other divisions and working on different assignments (such as divisions assigned to patrol neighborhoods like Venice and Hollywood, airport detail, Metropolitan Division, Air Support Division, and even desk duty), occasionally explained as them filling in for other officers or being part of police experience programs.

Malloy sometimes fills in for Sergeant William MacDonald as the watch commander in the show's final season. At the same time, Reed finds himself partnered with probationary officers, mirroring Malloy's original role as his field training officer. In the series finale, Reed receives the Medal of Valor for saving Malloy's life and completes an examination to become a detective, while Malloy is set for a promotion to sergeant.

The personal lives of Malloy and Reed came up on occasion and were often tied into their duties, though they rarely extended past conversations, episode subplots, or brief scenes. Malloy is a bachelor who has at least five girlfriends, not simultaneously, over the course of the series. Reed is married to a woman named Jean, played by several actresses, including Mikki Jamison and Kristin Nelson. In the second season, they have a son, Jim Jr., or Jimmy. Occasionally, Malloy and Reed are depicted socializing outside their work, but such scenes are rare. Although both characters are serious-minded and “by-the-book” officers, Malloy is more realistic when dealing with non-violent offenders while Reed is more rigid.

=== Vehicles ===
The police cars used in the series were central to the show; Webb "wanted the vehicle itself to be considered a character". As patrol officers, Malloy and Reed spent most of their time in their cruiser, and scenes set in or relating to their cruiser were central to the series. Most officers in the series drove recent-model sedans, while Sergeant MacDonald always used a station wagon version of Adam-12's vehicle.

In the pilot episode, Adam-12 used a 1967 Plymouth Belvedere; for the rest of the first season, a 1968 Plymouth Belvedere was used instead, later updated to a 1969 Plymouth Belvedere for the second and third seasons. In the fourth season, Adam-12 used a 1971 Plymouth Satellite. Starting with the fifth season, and for the rest of the series, Adam-12 used a 1972 AMC Matador.

=== Title ===
"1-Adam-12" is an LAPD call sign that combines three elements: the unit's patrol division, the type of patrol unit, and the daily assigned reporting district.

The "1" means the patrol car operates in Division 1 (Central Division), serving Downtown Los Angeles. The LAPD assigns two-officer patrol units the letter "A"; in the LAPD phonetic alphabet, the letter "A" is spoken as "Adam". The "12" comes from the daily assigned reporting district, or beat. Adam-12's "shop number"—a fleet vehicle identification number custom to the city government, located below the city seal on the front doors—was "80817" on the Belvedere, "83012" on the Satellite, and "85012" on the Matador.

Though the "1-Adam-12" radio call sign identified it as a Central Division unit, the police station Malloy and Reed worked from belonged to Rampart Division, which serves sections west of Downtown and uses "2" as its prefix number. There was also never a standard patrol unit with the call sign of "1-Adam-12", as all LAPD reporting districts are odd-numbered.

== Cast ==
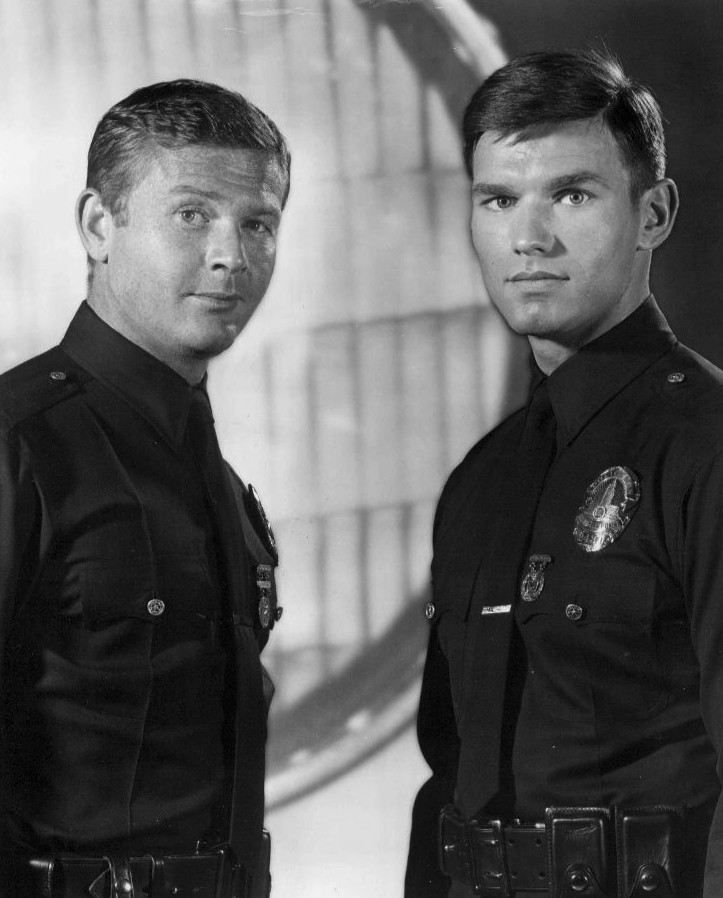
Martin Milner as Pete Malloy (left) and Kent McCord as Jim Reed (right)

- Martin Milner as Officer Pete Malloy: A veteran police officer who initially plans to resign from the LAPD, but remains on the force to guide Reed through his probationary period. He is acquainted or familiar with many officers in Central Division, as well as some citizens in Adam-12's usual patrol areas. By season 7, he is preparing for a promotion to Sergeant and spends time working as a watch commander. He is a bachelor but seeking, and the subplots of several episodes revolve around his dating life. His badge number is 744.
- Kent McCord as Officer Jim Reed: A rookie police officer assigned Malloy as his field training officer. After his probationary period, he remains Malloy's partner. Malloy does not trust him to drive the cruiser, a recurring joke throughout the series. At the end of season 7, he applies to become a detective. He is married and has a wife, Jean, and a son, Jimmy. His badge number is 2430.
- Shaaron Claridge as herself: A police dispatcher and desk clerk. Working alongside an unnamed male dispatcher, Claridge appears in voice only in almost every episode. She only physically appears briefly in season 5, episode 20. Claridge was an actual LAPD dispatcher who acted as a side job until her retirement in 1990.
- William Boyett as Sergeant William "Mac" MacDonald: The watch commander of Central Division. He is responsible for commanding and organizing the officers under him, including Malloy and Reed, who report to him and are sometimes assigned to cases by him. Mac is issued a station wagon and a Federal Riot Gun capable of firing tear gas rounds, which he and other officers are authorized to use in standoffs. In the field, his call sign is 1-Lincoln-20. He is mentioned to have a wife named Mary, a son named William "Billy", a daughter named Elizabeth, and a brother named Bryan.
- Gary Crosby as Officer Ed Wells: A police officer and one of Malloy's friends. In his first appearance in season 1, he is depicted as hot-headed and reckless, though this behavior is toned down in later seasons where he mostly serves as comic relief. He often pulls pranks and makes jokes at the expense of his fellow officers. Although he is frequently annoying and irritating to the other officers, especially Reed and Malloy, he is generally considered to be a good police officer. Throughout the series, he is seen with numerous different assigned partners. He was proposed as a potential successor to Malloy for a planned eighth season of Adam-12 that ultimately never materialized.
- William Elliott as Motor Officer Gus Grant: A motorcycle officer introduced in later seasons. He is laid-back but dedicated to his work and knows Malloy and Reed well. His use of a motorcycle is a factor in several incidents, with Adam-12 usually called in to support him with their cruiser. He is one of the only African American characters in the series to have a recurring role.
- Jack Hogan as Detective Sergeant Jerry Miller: A detective who handles investigations that Malloy and Reed assist with or are involved in, most prominently in the earlier seasons. Miller is often depicted in different detective divisions, such as homicide and internal affairs, similar to Joe Friday from Dragnet. Hogan also plays Lieutenant Fred Benson, an LAPD Air Support Division helicopter pilot.
- Art Gilmore as Lieutenant Moore: The commanding officer of Central Division. Dialogue in the pilot episode suggests he was Malloy's field training officer when he was a rookie. His role is greatly minimized between seasons 2 and 7, where he makes very few appearances, with Mac mostly taking up his role as the commander of Central Division. By season 7, he had been promoted to captain.
- Michael Warren as Officer Larry Carter: A rookie police officer who, at the time of his first appearance, is only two days out of the police academy. In season 4, episode 15, Carter is assigned to Malloy while Reed goes undercover in a narcotics ring. He was proposed as a potential successor to Malloy for a planned eighth season.
- Mark Harmon as Officer Gus Corbin: A rookie police officer. In season 7, episode 21, Reed is assigned to field train Corbin while Malloy fills in as watch commander for Mac. Corbin is shown to be inexperienced as well as clumsy and frequently puts himself at risk. However, he is still capable of effectively handling situations himself when necessary. He was proposed as a potential successor to Malloy for a planned eighth season.
- Jo Ann Pflug as Officer Dana Hall: A female police officer who, unusually for the time, is assigned to patrol duty. In season 7 episode 22, Hall is assigned to Reed while Malloy fills in as watch commander. Though Hall is initially met with derision by the other officers (especially Wells) for her gender, Reed respects her and shows she is just as capable of frontline policing as male officers. She was proposed as a potential successor to Malloy for a planned eighth season.
- Steve Franken as Officer Albert Porter: A reserve police officer and one of Reed's friends. Outside the LAPD, he works as an electrical engineer.
- Marco Lopez as Officer Sanchez: One of Wells's assigned partners. Lopez also plays other recurring officers, mostly unnamed background characters.
- Fred Stromsoe as Officer Jerry Woods: A recurring police officer. Stromsoe was also Milner's stunt double, and is credited in every episode.
- Claude Johnson as Officer Brinkman: A recurring police officer. Johnson also plays other recurring officers, including Officer Norm Green and Officer Johnson.
- William Stevens as Officer Jerry Walters: A recurring police officer. Stevens also plays Officer Lou Walters, another recurring officer.
- Robert Rothwell as Officer Russo: A recurring police officer who only appeared in the first season.
- Robert Patten as Detective Sergeant Stone: A recurring detective. Patten also plays other detectives and officers, including Detective Fremont, Detective Sergeant Benson, Detective Speer, Sergeant Baron, and Sergeant King.
- Chuck Bowman as Detective Cole Edwards: A recurring detective. Bowman also plays other characters, including Harold Thompson, Officer Rogers, Officer Miller, Lieutenant Andrews, and Sergeant McCall.
- Mikki Jamison and Kristin Nelson (actor varies between seasons) as Jean Reed: Jim Reed's wife. She dislikes that Reed is a police officer due to the dangers of his work, and fears for his safety, though she is otherwise supportive of him. She has a son, Jimmy.
- Jed Allan as Reno West: A cat burglar active in the Los Angeles area. He was previously caught by Malloy, but was released four years later, after which he attempted to return to burglaries; however, he was caught again by Malloy and Reed. He plays a significant role throughout season 6.
- Robert Donner as T.J.: A street informant, appearing in six episodes over several seasons.
- Aneta Corsaut as Judy: One of Malloy's girlfriends, first appearing in season 7.

== Production ==
Universal Studios co-produced the show with Mark VII Limited. The series' first episode, "Log 1: The Impossible Mission", was filmed in September 1967, a year before the pilot was picked up.

The production of Adam-12 involved showing all aspects of correct police procedures. Many elements in the show changed to reflect new policies and regulations in the real LAPD; for instance, when the LAPD switched from the 6-inch Smith & Wesson Model 14 to the 4-inch Smith & Wesson Model 15 in 1970, the service revolvers in the show similarly changed starting in the fourth season. Police cruisers played a central role, as "Webb wanted the vehicle itself to be considered a character". The show's routine use of police radio communications and jargon helped reinforce "the sound of radio as an anti-crime technology." The police vehicles used in the production of the show were purchased from local dealerships and outfitted by the prop department to accurate LAPD cruiser specifications.

The driving scenes were filmed on public streets using a dedicated camera platform mounted to the cruiser's hood, which was towed by a station wagon. The platform held three cameras: the center camera would film both Milner and McCord in one shot, while the left and right cameras would film Milner and McCord, respectively, on a cross-angle. All three cameras were remote-controlled and would roll simultaneously. For the pilot, Webb did not like the reflections of the sky on the windshield (which made Milner and McCord difficult to see), so the windshield of the vehicle was removed; however, this made the actors' hair blow and caused issues with the audio recording equipment. The prop department's solution was to reinstall the windshield and build an overhead shield that extended over the hood and windshield of the car to block the reflections. Sides were added to create a large "black box" over the front of the vehicle with both ends "open", which allowed for more controlled filming circumstances. During filming, the script supervisor would lie on the floor in the back of the car to read script dialogue for the voices coming from the police radio, which Milner and McCord would respond to. The director and the sound man would sit in a rear-facing seat in the back of the station wagon towing the police car.

Most scenes in the older seasons were filmed at the Universal Studios Lot, mostly in Courthouse Square and Colonial Street. Starting with the third and fourth seasons, the series gradually shifted to filming in actual locations in Los Angeles and the San Fernando Valley. The garage used tow trucks from the LAPD's North Hollywood Division that was located near Universal Studios.

The police station used in the series was the Rampart Police Station, located at 2710 West Temple Street. The station was built in 1966, two years before the series began, and could thus be considered "state of the art" for most of the series' run. Rampart Police Station was closed in 2008, and Rampart Division moved to the newer and larger Rampart Community Police Station. The old station was renovated to serve as the headquarters for the LAPD Metropolitan Division. The renovated building, now known as the LAPD Metropolitan Division Facility, opened in 2016.

In 1974, during the production of the seventh season, Martin Milner signed to play Karl Robinson on the short-lived television series The Swiss Family Robinson, taking him off Adam-12. Several options were tested during this season, which would allow the series to continue should the production of a proposed eighth season move forward. Jo Ann Pflug, Mark Harmon, and Michael Warren were tested for their potential to replace Milner in episodes where McCord served as their training officer or partner. Another idea proposed that the series be continued with Officer Ed Wells, played by Gary Crosby, replacing Malloy, who would be written off with a promotion to Sergeant at another division. However, the birth of Kent McCord's son three days before the seventh season's finale aired took McCord off the show as well, forcing the series to end with the seventh season.

== Reception and cultural impact ==
The police vehicles were central characters in that "mobile patrol units [became] associated with the black and white units made famous in such television shows as Adam-12". It was one of the shows that portrayed "the professionalism of the officers and police departments". Ronald Wayne Rodman pointed out that the theme of Adam-12 referred to a "military-style topic while portraying a sense of contemporary action". Douglas Rushkoff noted, "Adam-12 also marked [the] last gasp of the righteous style of cop TV." Their set was not a squad room or an office, but the actors "watched the changes in American culture through the windshield of their squad car". "12", a slang nickname for police, likely originated from Adam-12, in a manner comparable to the similar nickname "five-O", which originated from Hawaii Five-O.

In 2003, the Los Angeles Police Department activated an actual unit with the 1-Adam-12 call sign, in service with the Central Division. The unit was not a standard patrol unit and was only assigned to officers who demonstrated "outstanding duty performance".

=== References in other media ===
Milner and McCord made cameo appearances as their Adam-12 characters in several episodes of the fifth season of Rowan & Martin's Laugh-In, including one that parodied the series' in-cruiser dialogue scenes.

Western Publishing's Gold Key Comics published an Adam-12 comic book from 1973 to 1976.

Nashville Beat, a 1989 television film about an LAPD detective teaming up with his former partner to stop a dangerous gang in Nashville, Tennessee, starred Milner and McCord. Though the pair being former partners in the LAPD is a nod to Adam-12, the characters have different names, and the show is not otherwise mentioned or referenced.

Milner and McCord would make two appearances in a revival of Adam-12 that ran over two seasons from 1990 to 1991. In one episode, both actors made cameo appearances as store owners. In the season one episode "Crack House", Milner guest-starred as Malloy, now a captain; in the following episode, "R.T.D. 211", McCord guest-starred as Reed, now a lieutenant.

In 1999, Mattel produced a die-cast toy police car based on Adam-12 as part of their "Star Car" series.

In a scene from The Matrix Reloaded, "1-Adam-12" can be heard over a police radio feed.

In the fourth OVA episode ("Revenge Road") of the 1987 anime Bubblegum Crisis, the call sign of an AD Police helicopter is "Adam-12".

==== Connections to other Mark VII shows ====
Adam-12, Dragnet, and Emergency! are set in the same universe and depict different aspects of the public safety infrastructure of Los Angeles. Each series has several crossover episodes with characters from other Mark VII shows.

Malloy and Reed appear in the Dragnet episode "Internal Affairs: DR-20", as well as The D.A. episode "The People vs. Saydo" (the conclusion to a crossover that begins in "The Radical"). Sergeant MacDonald appears in the Dragnet episode "Personnel: The Shooting".

The Adam-12 episode "Lost and Found" was set at Rampart General Hospital and featured the Emergency! cast. Malloy and Reed appeared in the Emergency! pilot movie, "The Wedworth-Townsend Act". Despite the apparent relation between these shows, Adam-12 is shown to be a television show in one Emergency! episode, contradicting the officers' physical appearances.

Several years after Adam-12's finale, Kent McCord was to appear in a planned third series of Dragnet, playing Sgt. Friday's partner, but the project was canceled due to Jack Webb's sudden death in December 1982. Since none of the scripts Webb wrote for the project were ever produced or released, it is not clear if he intended for McCord to play Jim Reed or a different character, though in the final episode of Adam-12 — the two-part "Something Worth Dying For" — Reed mentions applying to join the Detective Bureau.

== Revival ==
A revival of Adam-12 by The Arthur Company, titled The New Adam-12, aired in first-run syndication in tandem with The New Dragnet, another revival of a Jack Webb series. Like The New Dragnet, The New Adam-12 had different characters, music, and presentation compared to the original series, and starred Ethan Wayne as Officer Matt Doyle and Peter Parros as Officer Gus Grant (seemingly unrelated to the Motor Officer Gus Grant seen in the original show, played by William Elliott).

Fifty-two episodes were aired over two seasons. The first season aired from September 24, 1990, to March 18, 1991; the second season aired from March 25, 1991, to September 16, 1991.

== Notable guest-star actor and actress appearances ==
Many famous performers and some who achieved fame later appeared in various episodes of Adam-12.

- Episode 2, "Log 141: The Color TV Bandit", stars Cloris Leachman and Melody Patterson.
- Episode 8, "Log 72: El Presidente", guest-stars James Sikking, later of Hill Street Blues fame (Lt. Howard Hunter), and other various character roles as an armed robber.
- Episode 10, "Log 132: Producer", stars Karen Black (Easy Rider, Five Easy Pieces, Airport 1975, Dogtown) and James McEachin (DJ in Play Misty for Me). McEachin also appeared in five additional episodes, each time in a different role, as well as several episodes of Emergency! as a Sheriff's Detective.
- Episode 12, "Log 61: The Runaway", features real-life brothers Jerry Mathers (Beaver from Leave It to Beaver) and Jim Mathers as two rambunctious kids.
- Episode 16, "Log 62: Grand Theft Horse?", guest-stars Tim Matheson as a horse thief.
- Episode 19, "Log 51: A Jumper, Code 2", stars Hal Smith of The Andy Griffith Show.
- Episode 22, "Log 152: A Dead Cop Can't Help Anyone", stars Barry Williams (Greg Brady of The Brady Bunch).
- Episode 25, "Log 92: Tell Him He Pushed Back a Little Too Hard", guest-stars Dick Sargent (Darrin Stephens #2 of Bewitched) and Jacqueline Scott (who played Donna Taft, the sister of Dr. Richard Kimble, in four episodes of The Fugitive).
- Episode 26, "Log 22: So This Little Guy Goes into This Bar, and..." guest-stars Harry Dean Stanton as a welfare hustler.
- Episode 43, "Log 24: A Rare Occasion" stars David Cassidy of The Partridge Family as a neighbor of Reed's who falls victim to a drug pusher.
- Episode 53, "Loan Sharks", guest-stars Eve McVeagh, film actress of High Noon, Tight Spot, and television series The Clear Horizon and Faraway Hill.
- Episode 57, "Cigarettes, Cars, and Wild, Wild Women", features Tony Dow (Wally from Leave It to Beaver) as a young United States Marine who is a victim of a car theft ring.
- Episode 58, "Log 55: Missing Child", guests stars Jodie Foster as the playmate of a missing child.
- Episode 60, "Log 105, Elegy for a Pig" guest-stars Mark Goddard (Major Don West of Lost in Space) as Malloy's friend and police academy classmate, Officer Tom Porter; and shows a great deal of Malloy's backstory, as well as what happens when an LAPD officer is killed in the line of duty.
- Episode 66, "Log 115: Gang War", guest-stars Trini Lopez as a local Latino priest who tries to help the officers prevent a rumble between two Latino gangs. Lopez would also appear the following year as "Steve Hernandez" in Episode 95: "The Parole Violator".
- Episode 69, "Log 66: The Vandals", guest-stars Robert I. Clarke as the father of a teenage girl.
- Episode 77, "Log 88 - Reason to Run", guest-stars Randolph Mantooth as "Neil Williams"; and in an Emergency! cross-over episode as a paramedic, "John Gage", Episode 106, "Lost and Found". This episode also guest-starred Linda Kaye Henning of Petticoat Junction.
- Episode 80, "The Million Dollar Buff", guests-stars Lindsay Wagner (The Bionic Woman) as a jewelry counter attendant.
- Episode 81, "The Grandmother", guest-stars Ozzie Nelson of The Adventures of Ozzie and Harriet fame. He also directed this episode.
- Episode 82, "The Radical", guest-stars Robert Conrad as Paul Ryan of the DA's office. This episode was a crossover with Conrad's series, The D.A.
- Episode 91, "The Pickup", guest-stars Barbara Hale of Perry Mason and Kathy Garver of Family Affair.
- Episode 94, "The Tip", guest-stars Larry Linville (later of M*A*S*H fame as Frank Burns) as a police detective whom Malloy and Reed assist on an ongoing case.
- Episode 97, "Mary Hong Loves Tommy Chen", guest-stars Foster Brooks, Keye Luke, and Jo Ann Worley.
- Episode 98, "Sub-Station", guest-stars Frank Sinatra Jr., portrays a disturbed man who takes a stewardess hostage and demands a meeting with a Hollywood director. He would also guest-star in a later season episode as an officer in the same division.
- Episode 100, "Who Won", guest-stars Dick Clark of American Bandstand and Dick Clark's New Year's Rockin' Eve fame as Benson, the drag strip owner.
- Episode 103, "Dirt Duel", guest-stars Edd Byrnes of 77 Sunset Strip and Micky Dolenz of The Monkees as bikers.
- Episode 104, "The Late Baby", guest-stars both Tina Sinatra and Frank Sinatra Jr. as unrelated characters.
- Episode 105, "Airdrop", guest-stars singer Al Martino of The Godfather who portrayed "Paul Stocker", a drug smuggling private plane pilot.
- Episode 108, "Badge Heavy", features Jack Bailey, host of Queen for a Day and Truth or Consequences.
- Episode 131, "Venice Division", guest-stars Laurette Spang of the original Battlestar Galactica as a woman who fears for her life after receiving obscene phone calls.
- Episode 137, "Northwest Division", guest-stars Johnny Whitaker of Family Affair as a juvenile on a minibike. In addition, Martin Milner's real-life son Andrew played Whitaker's stunt double in the minibike chase scene.
- Episode 149, "L.A. International", Season 6, Episode 23. This episode aired 12 March 1974, with guest-star Tina Cole who played Katie from My Three Sons.
- Episode 150, "Clinic on Eighteenth Street", guest-stars Sharon Gless, later of Cagney & Lacey fame and most recently co-star of Burn Notice on USA Network and Frank Sinatra Jr. in his third role on the show.
- Episode 151, "Camp: Part 1" and Camp: Part 2", guest-star June Lockhart, of Lost in Space as the widowed mother of a son who is on the edge of being a full-blown juvenile delinquent.
- Episode 158, "X-Force", guest-stars Paul Gleason as the father of a kidnapped girl. Gleason guest-starred in other various roles throughout the series.
- Episode 159, "Alcohol", guest-stars Dick Van Patten, later of Eight Is Enough fame, as a belligerent drunk who believes himself to be Albert Einstein.
- Episode 164, "Victim of the Crime", features Martin Milner's real-life daughter Amy Milner as Debbie McMahon, the shopkeeper's daughter.
- Episode 170, "Operation Action", features Kent McCord's real-life daughter Kristen McCord as a child named Debra, playing hopscotch when Reed pulls up behind Malloy's abandoned car.
- Episode 171, "Gus Corbin", guest-stars Mark Harmon, the star of NCIS from 2003 until 2021.
- Episode 172, "Dana Hall", features Jo Ann Pflug of the movie M*A*S*H as Officer Dana Hall, a probationary police officer, Acting Watch Commander Malloy, teams with Reed in 1-Adam-12.
- Episode 174, "Something Worth Dying For, Part 2", features Kimberly Beck, future leading lady of Friday the 13th: The Final Chapter, as a troubled teenage girl who ends up getting arrested along with her boyfriend.

== Episodes ==
=== Home media ===
Universal Studios released Season 1 of Adam 12 on DVD in Region 1 on August 23, 2005.

In fall 2008, Shout! Factory acquired the distribution rights through an agreement with Universal. They have subsequently released the remaining 6 seasons, with season 7 packaging titled "The Final Season".

In Region 4, Umbrella Entertainment has released the first two seasons on DVD in Australia.

DVD name	Ep #	Release date	
DVD name	Ep #	Region 1	Region 4
Season 1	26	August 23, 2005; February 13, 2018 (re-release)	May 11, 2011
Season 2	26	September 30, 2008	August 3, 2011
Season 3	26	August 11, 2009	TBA
Season 4	24	February 23, 2010	TBA
Season 5	24	August 10, 2010	TBA
Season 6	24	January 17, 2012	TBA
Season 7	24	April 10, 2012	TBA

=== Broadcast ===
From January 5, 2015, to December 27, 2019, episodes of Adam-12 aired on Cozi TV. The series had been airing on MeTV from May 2013 until January 1, 2015, when its place in the network's weekday afternoon lineup was taken by Adventures of Superman. Adam-12 previously aired on Me-TV's competitor Antenna TV until April 2013, on Retro Television Network, and on i: Independent Television before that. On January 1, 2020, the show returned to MeTV as part of their afternoon block of programming alongside Dragnet at 5/4C PM (Dragnet aired periodically in the morning at 6/5C AM). On April 3, 2023, Adam-12 started to air on FETV. As of 2025, Adam-12 airs in the early morning on MeTV weekdays at 6am EST and late nights on FETV every night at 10:25pm and weekends at 5:40pm and 6:20pm EST.

=== Internet ===
All episodes from Adam-12 were available for online streaming on Amazon Prime's Freevee streaming service until it was removed. Seasons 1–7 are available on Philo streaming service.
