= Adam-12 (1990 TV series) =

1990 television series

- Also known as: The New Adam-12
- Genre: Police procedural
- Created by: Robert A. Cinader; Jack Webb
- Directed by: Charles Bail; Rob Stewart; Georg Fenady
- Starring: Ethan Wayne; Peter Parros; Miguel Fernandes; Alma Martinez; Linden Ashby; Harri James
- Country of origin: United States
- Original language: English
- No. of seasons: 2
- No. of episodes: 52

Production
- Executive producer: Arthur L. Annecharico
- Producers: Burton Armus; John Whitman
- Cinematography: Don McCuaig; J. Barry Herron
- Editor: Lawrence J. Gleason
- Running time: 22 minutes
- Production companies: The Arthur Company; Universal Television

Original release
- Network: Syndication
- Release: September 24, 1990 – September 16, 1991

Related
- Adam-12

Adam-12 (also known as The New Adam-12) is an American police procedural crime drama television series produced by Arthur L. Annecharico, Burton Armus, and John Whitman under The Arthur Company and Universal Television. It is a syndicated revival of the 1968–1975 series of the same name created by Robert A. Cinader and Jack Webb (both credited posthumously as series creators) and features the same premise with different characters and an updated setting, following Los Angeles Police Department (LAPD) officers Matt Doyle and Gus Grant as they patrol Los Angeles in their police cruiser, assigned the call sign "1-Adam-12". The New Adam-12 stars Ethan Wayne and Peter Parros, and co-stars Miguel Fernandes, Alma Martinez, Linden Ashby, and Harri James, among others. The series ran over two seasons of 26 episodes each, and aired consecutively for 52 straight weeks, with the entire series airing over one full calendar year from September 24, 1990, to September 16, 1991.

The New Adam-12 aired alongside The New Dragnet, another remake of a 1960s Jack Webb series by The Arthur Company that was implied to be set in the same fictional universe. Both revivals were considerably different from their original works; most notably, the performances leaned more toward action but had far less depictions of violence, their scores eschewed the original themes for new synth-pop and jazz fusion tunes typical to police procedurals of the era, and the lead cruiser was a 1989 Ford LTD Crown Victoria.

== Cast and characters ==
- Ethan Wayne as Officer Matt Doyle: A white officer, and the revival's adaptation of Pete Malloy. His father was a New York City Police Department officer who his mother cheated on to deal with the stresses of waiting for him to get home, which made Doyle insist he would never be a police officer, though he eventually became one anyway. Doyle has a reserved, by-the-book personality. He is single, and the subplots and in-car conversations in several episodes follow his thoughts on single life and opportunities at finding a girlfriend.
- Peter Parros as Officer Gus Grant: An African American officer, and the revival's adaptation of Jim Reed. His father was a Korean War veteran. Before joining the LAPD, he attended the University of California, Los Angeles where he was a star college football player, and several one-off characters in the series recognize him from then. Grant has an approachable, laid-back personality. He is married, and the demands of his wife are the topic of subplots and in-car conversations in several episodes. His name is derived from an African American motorcycle officer from the original Adam-12 played by William Elliott, but they are separate characters.
- Miguel Fernandes as Sergeant Harry Santos: The watch commander of Central Division. He tends to speak in a commanding, emotive manner with a no-nonsense personality, especially during roll call, but he is otherwise caring for the officers under his command, and is willing to loosen up and banter with them when appropriate. In season 2 episode 11, "Lock House", he is replaced in his role by Cruz.
- Alma Martinez as Sergeant Elizabeth Cruz: The watch commander of Central Division, replacing Santos from season 2 episode 11, "Lock House", onwards. She is overall similar to Santos, but lacks his emotive banter-prone personality and is shown to be more willing to personally care for the officers under her command.
- Linden Ashby as Officer Honeycutt: A recurring officer at Central Division who is friends with Doyle and Grant. He is partnered with Neville.
- Harri James as Officer Neville: A recurring officer at Central Division who is friends with Doyle and Grant. She is partnered with Honeycutt.

== Episodes ==
=== Season 1 (1990–91) ===
No. overall	No. in season	Title	Directed by	Written by	Original release date
1	1	"The Sniper"	Charles Bail	Burton Armus	September 24, 1990
While on patrol, Doyle and Grant are attacked by a sniper (Dean Jacobson) targeting police officers because he was denied the opportunity to become one himself. After a string of attacks and a close call with an unrelated man with a gun, Doyle, Grant, and Sergeant Santos manage to locate and apprehend the sniper. Meanwhile, a man seeks help after being blackmailed for change and tuna fish sandwiches by an elderly woman; and Doyle attempts to talk down a potential jumper who turns out to be a highwire walker.
2	2	"Kid Cop"	Charles Bail	E. Nick Alexander	October 1, 1990
Doyle and Grant are called to a chain of incidents where they happen to arrive just in time to intervene. Suspicious of the apparent preemptive timing of the calls, the suspects always being from the same Hispanic gang, and the presence of a young boy at the scene of each one, the pair investigate and learn the boy, Manko Salseda (Dante Basco), is a police buff who seeks the LAPD's help in getting his brother Julio (Jaime P. Gomez) out of the gang life. Meanwhile, a sunbather tries to seduce Doyle while repeatedly reporting a possible voyeur that turns out to be a stray cat; and Grant arrests a charismatic speaker for detonating fireworks in a park.
3	3	"Neighbors"	Georg Fenady	Joseph Gunn	October 8, 1990
Doyle and Grant respond to a series of disputes between neighbors Ben Miller (Nicholas Worth) and Charlie Korowski (Med Flory) that gradually escalate. Though the dispute seems to be resolved when the officers arrest them for fighting, it quickly fires up again, resulting in a bloody culmination. Meanwhile, Doyle and Grant investigate a scam involving a collection basket and a "faulty" ATM; and the pair battle a strong delusional man wrecking a store.
4	4	"Gay Bashing"	Georg Fenady	Stephen Glantz	October 15, 1990
Doyle and Grant are tasked with catching a group of homophobic young men assaulting gay men, but tensions between police and the city's LGBT community stifle the investigation. Meanwhile, the officers investigate a series of thefts in which specific parts of different classic cars are stolen by scrapyard owners seeking to make old car parts more accessible; and a member of a nudist counterculture commune tries to report a theft.
5	5	"Witchcraft"	Charles Bail	Elliott Anderson	October 22, 1990
An investigation into the abduction and murder of a guide dog, the theft of a corpse from a mortuary, and the kidnapping of a transient uncovers a cult seeking to revive a dead man using black magic. Meanwhile, a chance encounter with a jaywalker leads to the capture of thieves attempting to sneak a priceless statue out in a stroller; and a man's clothing sizes are used to identify him as a tailor robber.
6	6	"Vigilante"	Charles Bail	Ted Alben & Greg Klein	October 29, 1990
Actor Howie Melton (Jonathan Prince) is assigned to ride-along with Doyle and Grant as research for his upcoming film Midnight Heat. Though his laid-back attitude causes problems, he comes to understand the realities of police work when Adam-12 is assigned to handle a series of rapes that nearly drive a neighborhood into violence when a vigilante group is formed to exact retribution against the rapist. Meanwhile, the officers follow up on a series of washing machine and clothes dryer thefts that are complicated when Melton's fame distracts the victims from filing reports.
7	7	"Follow Home"	Georg Fenady	Ralph Meyering Jr. & Richard Stanley	November 5, 1990
Doyle and Grant investigate a series of violent thefts targeting wealthy women who are followed home from grocery stores. On the police's side, Central Division raises money to pay bail for Homer, a shoeshiner familiar with the officers who was imprisoned for jaywalking. Meanwhile, two elderly neighbors argue over the whereabouts of one of their dogs; and a man steals a five-ton truck of watermelons to sell for himself.
8	8	"Real Estate Scam"	Georg Fenady	Peter Parros	November 12, 1990
Doyle and Grant seek to put an end to a real estate scam, in which a sweet-talking con man forges homeowners' signatures and sells their homes without their knowledge, before his actions ruin more lives. Meanwhile, a bar is plagued by a G.I. Joe fan prone to destructive fights; and the officers keep tabs on a cockfighter familiar to police.
9	9	"Teach the Children"	Rob Stewart	Nancy Ann Miller	November 19, 1990
Central Division shifts its full attention to apprehending a child molester, which also prompts Doyle and Grant to teach a child safety course for parents; the molester is eventually caught, only to quickly get out on bail. Meanwhile, two strangers argue over smoking caused by one's trauma and the other's indifference; a neighborhood's garbage is targeted by an ecologist seeking to promote recycling and end waste; and a spoiled celebrity seeks to use her fame to barter her way out of a traffic stop, only to be arrested when she slaps Doyle. The episode ends with a public service announcement to report missing children to the National Center for Missing & Exploited Children.
10	10	"211 Cabs"	Rob Stewart	Carlton Hollander & Dennis Rodriguez	November 26, 1990
Doyle and Grant investigate a series of violent armed robberies and car bombings targeting taxis, which escalate when one taxi driver is found dead. Meanwhile, the pair investigates the "borrowing" of a priceless gourmet cookbook by an aspiring young chef; a motorist is held at gunpoint by an elderly woman for allegedly hitting her cat with his car; a woman who enjoys cheating is mistaken for a prowler; and a white taxi driver and a black passenger abruptly switch sides in an argument about the safety of certain neighborhoods.
11	11	"Framed"	Charles Bail	Stan Berkowitz	December 3, 1990
After taking part in a narcotics raid and arresting Mr. Simms (Sy Richardson), a drug dealer familiar to him, Grant finds his career in jeopardy after Mr. Simms's son Darren (Theo Forsett) accuses him of planting evidence. With Doyle having had his back to him and Grant having threatened Mr. Simms prior, there is little evidence to prove Grant's innocence, but Doyle convinces Mrs. Simms (Claudia Robinson) to come forward, and Darren admits his father pressured him to lie, exonerating Grant. Meanwhile, a developmentally disabled restaurant dishwasher runs away after accidentally breaking plates; and a meter maid's stolen cart is mysteriously found on a roof.
12	12	"Escapees"	Charles Bail	Stephen W. Johnson	December 10, 1990
Three inmates escape from a Los Angeles County Sheriff's Department prisoner transport vehicle, and Central Division is ordered to assist in the manhunt. Doyle and Grant quickly apprehend one escapee, a burglar who was forced to go with them, while the remaining two attempt to flee the city with a stolen rifle. Meanwhile, the officers unravel a scheme by two women to abduct cats and return them when a cash reward is offered; and a man engaging in sexual roleplay with his adventurous wife is mistaken for both a burglar and a rapist.
13	13	"The Blue Avengers"	Rob Stewart	Joseph Gunn	December 17, 1990
When mom-and-pop supermarkets are targeted by a sadistic robber who is quick to kill without hesitation, Doyle and Grant race to warn the other markets in the area and stop him before he can strike again. All the while, Grant tries to entertain the idea of taking cues from his favorite cop show, The Blue Avengers, which Doyle lambasts as being unrealistic, but a trick Grant learns from the show manages to save a shopkeeper from the robber. Meanwhile, the officers seek out a pair of women who rob drunk businessmen and steal their pants; an anxiety-ridden mother insists her adult son is in danger, despite him being safe at his home; and a hillside homeowner reports a mountain lion on her property.
14	14	"The Landlord"	Rob Stewart	Leonard Mlodinow & Scott Rubenstein	December 24, 1990
A wealthy landlord is kidnapped by unidentified assailants who debadge and abandon his Rolls-Royce, and Doyle and Grant attempt to find him. The kidnappers turn out to be his impoverished tenants seeking revenge for him keeping their house in a squalid condition, and Grant convinces them to spare him in exchange for their story being reported sympathetically in the newspapers. Between calls, Doyle and Grant debate their opposing views on dieting and calorie-counting. Meanwhile, a bakery owner is harassed by a street artist who keeps pasting political cartoons and caricatures to his window, which is resolved when they agree to work together; and a teenage genius's sociology experiment brings him legal trouble when he tampers with the traffic lights outside his house to deliberately cause traffic jams.
15	15	"Gang of Two"	Charles Bail	Burton Armus	December 31, 1990
In a modern take on Romeo and Juliet, John Romero (Timothy Williams) and Julie Martinez (Victoria Gallegos), two members of rivalling Hispanic gangs, attempt to flee to Arizona together for a better life, but tragedy befalls them when their gangs form a truce to kill them. Between shifts, Doyle is ticketed by the California Highway Patrol and ordered to attend traffic school, where he meets Nicki Layton (Julie St. Claire), a woman who dislikes LAPD officers, and lies about his job to date her, only to pull her over while on duty. Meanwhile, Santos sends Doyle and Grant on a special assignment to help animal control retrieve a pet store's loose boa constrictor.
16	16	"Keep On Truckin"	Charles Bail	Paul Aratow	January 7, 1991
Doyle and Grant pursue trigger-happy semi truck hijackers, and the case becomes personal for Grant when one victim dies in his arms while driving to a hospital; they catch the hijackers with help from backup following a brief pursuit. Simultaneously, a taxi driver robs his passengers in an unusually polite manner, only stealing replaceable things (such as an expensive shirt and jewelry the passenger was selling anyway) and giving his victims money for another fare, and the officers catch him when he helps a pregnant passenger give birth without stealing from her. Meanwhile, an elderly thrill-seeker fakes a story about a nonexistent late husband's anniversary to dine and dash at fancy restaurants.
17	17	"Panic in Alverez Park"	Rob Stewart	E. Nick Alexander	January 14, 1991
Doyle and Grant find themselves responding to calls at Alvarez Park, a public park next to a pedestrian mall. While there, the officers are warned about Reuben Carter (Robert O'Reilly), a homeless career criminal operating out of the park with an accomplice, but their attempts at stopping him clash with the priest of a church serving as a sanctuary for Salvadoran refugees, who the neighborhood blames for the rise in crime. Meanwhile, a woman cries sleepwalking in an attempt to get out of shoplifting charges; a stuck-up shopper attempts to get a homeless man arrested simply for begging; and a break-in at a curio store.
18	18	"Going Home"	Rob Stewart	Stephen Glantz	January 21, 1991
Billy Kenner (Ash Adams), an ex-con with a troubled youth, tries to get himself sent back to prison after finding life on the outside too hard for him to handle. However, when Kenner's attempts at getting a serious charge without causing harm fail, Doyle and Grant attempt to stop him from making too serious of a mistake. Meanwhile, a woman faces threats from her boyfriend's wife when their affair is revealed in a pending divorce, but they ultimately come to understand each other when they realize the adulterous man is the real problem; and Central Division experiences issues when half of the on-duty units respond to reports of an overweight female flasher.
19	19	"Lover Mugger"	Charles Bail	Dan DiStefano & Steve Hayes	January 28, 1991
A rapist attacks young couples on the side of Mulholland Drive and uses a dirt bike to outmaneuver and evade pursuing units, so Grant uses a friend's hillside property as an observation point to stake out popular spots. Meanwhile, the officers deal with a group of workers blaming an overweight worker for stealing their lunches, which turns out to be the work of a raccoon in their portable office; a woman reports ghosts under her floor, which turn out to be teenagers skateboarding through a drainage pipe that passes under her house to the Los Angeles River; and Adam-12, assisted by Honeycutt and Neville, handles a "break-in" at a laundromat by a customer who was locked in overnight.
20	20	"211 Pizza"	Charles Bail	Carlton Hollander & Dennis Rodriguez	February 4, 1991
A string of violent robberies targets pizza delivery drivers by calling them to empty houses, then assaulting and robbing them; the stakes heighten when one delivery driver is murdered. Meanwhile, a cross-dressing lingerie store employee uses the store owner's absence to steal products from storage; a wannabe comedian draws police attention for including fake bombs in his routine; and two elderly women and a retired publicist fake a robbery at a retirement home, seeking to draw media and public sympathies to pressure the bank to not foreclose on them.
21	21	"Crack House"	Rob Stewart	Burton Armus	February 11, 1991
A crack house in an otherwise quiet neighborhood invites disruption, gang activity, and eventually shootings, with the disrespectful residents consistently being released back to the house regardless of police actions. The cycle angers their neighbors to the point of one of them taking matters into his own hands. Meanwhile, a valuable horse is stolen from stables in Griffith Park; and a city park ranger becomes convinced ducks are being stolen from a city pond, bringing them across a group of homeless ex-cons who may or may not have caught some for food.
22	22	"R.T.D. 211"	Rob Stewart	Ted Alben & Greg Klein	February 18, 1991
Doyle and Grant respond to a series of back-to-back armed robberies on Southern California Rapid Transit District buses, while also handling a copycat. At a dispute with a Romani fortune teller, Doyle is "cursed" for insisting she apply for a business license; though he blows it off, a chain of unexplained inconveniences lead him to return to the fortune teller to lift the curse by simply promoting her business. Meanwhile, the officers deal with a bickering husband and wife who keep getting involved in traffic incidents as he attempts to teach her how to drive.
23	23	"D.A.R.E."	Charles Bail	Elliott Anderson	February 25, 1991
Doyle and Grant are sent to a high school to help with a Drug Abuse Resistance Education class, when the car of Principal Logan Mills (Ron Glass) suddenly explodes in the parking lot. Mills, believing it to be retribution for his opposition to a group of impoverished teenagers he believes are gang members, blames Jimmy Washington (Christopher M. Brown), one of the teenagers he is at odds with; however, Washington is revealed to not be the culprit, prompting Grant to chastise him for making assumptions based on his race and class. The officers eventually identify the actual suspect and stop him before he can bring a handgun to school, and Mills and Washington make up. Meanwhile, the officers arrest Constance Mann (Bridget Hanley), a prominent Venice resident and executive director of the Venice Canal Association, for driving under the influence, but face pressure from the Association to dismiss her charges.
24	24	"Operation Estafadores"	Charles Bail	Dan DiStefano & Steve Hayes	March 4, 1991
When a community of Hispanic illegal immigrants faces harassment and reprisals from a gang, but none of the victims or residents speak to Doyle and Grant out of fears of being deported, the officers turn to Operation Estafadores, an LAPD program to promote cooperation with police in exchange for overlooking their immigration status. One victim, Miguel Ruiz (Fausto Bara), finds himself stuck between his personal needs and the police's needs for his assistance in stopping the gang terrorizing his community. Meanwhile, a Selma, Alabama native, believing himself to be a werewolf and fearing the imminent full moon, attempts to get himself imprisoned for the night to save others from himself; and a cable lineman calls the police to protect him from a mob when a cable outage occurs just before a football game.
25	25	"Eye of the Beholder"	Rob Stewart	Stan Berkowitz	March 11, 1991
Doyle and Grant investigate Drew White (Lance Kerwin), a frequent patron of a diner where he surveils Robin (Elizabeth Keifer), a waitress and his one-sided love interest. Though Robin is initially unconcerned, the mood shifts when he begins stalking her and the LAPD learns he is a manic depressive suffering from delusional disorders that has not renewed his prescription medication, but she is angered to learn there is nothing the police can do to act preemptively. Robin is eventually attacked by White, but he is released on mental health grounds and promptly abducts Robin before Doyle and Grant stop him. As they arrest White, Robin fears he will be released again and tries to kill him, but Doyle talks her down, explaining it is a systemic problem, not White's fault. Meanwhile, a teenager in a distinctive Toyota pickup truck distributes counterfeit money to various people, and upon being caught he reveals he got them from his father, a professional counterfeiter, in an attempt to uncover his activities.
26	26	"Immunity"	Rob Stewart	Burton Armus	March 18, 1991
With the United Nations General Assembly in session, diplomats visit Los Angeles to attend events; the LAPD deploys officers, including Doyle and Grant, to assist diplomatic security details. One guard from East Germany, former Volkspolizei officer Peter Rager (James Nixon), approaches Doyle and Grant seeking to defect to the United States. Doyle and Grant wish to help him, but the Federal Bureau of Investigation views him as a security risk, and jurisdictional issues arise from Rager's decision to approach civilian police instead of federal officials. Using a fake emergency as a distraction, Doyle and Grant separate Rager from his supervisors, allowing him to safely defect. Meanwhile, the officers stop recklessly-driving newlyweds and decide to help them flee to their honeymoon by delaying their pursuing family.

=== Season 2 (1991) ===
No. overall	No. in season	Title	Directed by	Written by	Original release date
27	1	"Power-Out"	Charles Bail	Stan Berkowitz	March 25, 1991
A sudden power outage cuts electricity to Central Los Angeles, and Central Division is put on alert to handle widespread looting and other back-to-back incidents complicated by the loss of power. During the outage, the officers meet an anti-nuclear power activist who hates modern technology but does not practice what he preaches; a driver's heart attack causes a collision; an impatient man holds an ER doctor at gunpoint to receive priority care, leading Doyle and Grant to disguise themselves as nurses to stop him; jewelry store customers trap a robber in the store's back room; a young man burglarizes a store to protect the owner's cash register from looters; and dozens of shotguns are stolen from a sporting goods retailer.
28	2	"Telephone Bandits"	Charles Bail	Nancy Ann Miller	April 1, 1991
Armed robbers use fake 9-1-1 calls for officers under attack to distract the police and send units out of their beats and away from their targets. While following up on the robberies, Randy Collins, a young boy dying of AIDS from an untested blood transfusion, is allowed to be a police officer for a day in cooperation with the Make-A-Wish Foundation, but Doyle and Grant's emotions are tested when Collins is hospitalized with no chance of recovery. Meanwhile, an old woman is revealed to be an insurance fraudster targeting bar patrons.
29	3	"The Intruders"	Rob Stewart	Joseph Gunn	April 8, 1991
A violent burglar targets women with pet doors, using a female scout and getaway driver to slip in and unlock the front door. Though their unusual methods confuse Central Division, Doyle and Grant track them down based on a hunch. Meanwhile, the officers discover a homicide victim in a stolen car, and the car thief's testimony leads them to drug dealers who shot the victim after a deal gone wrong.
30	4	"Trick-or-Treat"	Rob Stewart	Elliot Anderson	April 15, 1991
On Halloween, the LAPD is alerted to a man distributing candy apples containing razor blades to specifically Asian children. Meanwhile, two costumed "children", really two adults with dwarfism, commit armed robbery; and a young girl runs away from home to play at an event held by the Los Angeles County Department of Parks and Recreation, but her common costume makes searching for her difficult.
31	5	"Bump & Rape"	Charles Bail	E. Nick Alexander	April 22, 1991
A rapist targets female motorists in the outskirts of Los Angeles by ramming them off the road. When a traumatized victim kills herself, the pair sets out to stop him before he can strike again, seeking the assistance of the LAPD Cadets. Meanwhile, a morbidly obese relapsing food addict steals food from delicatessens after giving up hope of recovery; and a motel cleaning lady finds assault weapons owned by a firearm collector from Arizona who refuses to accept Los Angeles's weapon regulations.
32	6	"Robber with a Badge"	Charles Bail	Caliope Brattlestreet & Stephen Glantz	April 29, 1991
A violent house robber impersonates an LAPD officer to gain access to his victims' homes, and Central Division tries to stop him before his actions destroy the public's trust in the LAPD; however, when Doyle and Grant intercept him in the act, the robber battles them in a shootout and kills himself instead of surrendering. Meanwhile, a dead man's body is stolen shortly before his wake by his friends who seek just a bit more time with him.
33	7	"211 Bonnie & Clyde"	Rob Stewart	Ted Alben & Greg Klein	May 6, 1991
A man and woman use violent attacks on salesmen during test drives to steal luxury cars from car dealerships. Elsewhere, Doyle reunites with Kathy, an old flame who is now an animal rights activist leading disruptive protests outside hospitals following an animal experimentation controversy, but his attempts at wooing her fall flat based on fundamental disagreements between each other. Meanwhile, a teenager calls the police in an attempt to report familial issues at home.
34	8	"211 Weddings"	Rob Stewart	Carlton Hollander & Dennis Rodriguez	May 13, 1991
Robbers armed with sawed-off shotguns target wedding ceremonies, stripping everyone in attendance of their money, jewelry, and valuables. The robberies escalate when a groom is murdered for trying to stop them, while an otherwise peaceful wedding is complicated when a well-connected father hires shady armed guards for his daughter's wedding without telling anyone. Meanwhile, a couple's daughter reports domestic violence, but her parents' denial of a problem leads her to be placed in foster care; and a homeowner holds a pair of unethical repairmen at gunpoint.
35	9	"Fear"	Charles Bail	Dan DiStefano & Steve Hayes	May 20, 1991
A routine traffic stop leads Doyle and Grant to arrest an influential drug dealer and recover a cache of guns, drugs, and money, but their refusal of a bribe prompts the dealer to place a hit against the officers to ensure they cannot testify against him. The stress of being targeted begins to disrupt Doyle and Grant's lives, while the rest of Central Division overbearingly tries to protect them, but the hit turns out to have simply been made up by the dealer in an attempt to act tough. Meanwhile, a dispute between neighbors over a loud parrot leads to the pet bird being shot; a mother at a motel leaves her baby in her car; and a sniper attempts to shoot at LAPD Air Support Division helicopters.
36	10	"Dead Delivery"	Charles Bail	Dan DiStefano & Steve Hayes	May 27, 1991
When a mugger on a scooter violently attacks United States Postal Service mailmen carrying money, Doyle and Grant team up with Postal Inspector Copeland (Justin Lord) to catch the mugger, but the restrictive bureaucratic nature of federal law enforcement stymies the investigation. Meanwhile, a traumatized ex-Army Ranger and Vietnam War veteran finds trouble when he begins brandishing his combat knife when stressed.
37	11	"Lock House"	Rob Stewart	E. Nick Alexander	June 3, 1991
A raid on an illegal brothel uncovers the activities of a pimp who lures teenage girls new to Los Angeles into becoming drug-addicted prostitutes. However, difficulties arise when a teenage victim helping them refuses to testify against the pimp after he intimidates her. At Central Division, Santos's position as watch commander is taken over by Sergeant Cruz.
38	12	"Acid Thrower"	Rob Stewart	Joseph Gunn	June 10, 1991
Doyle and Grant race to stop a sadistic robber who sprays nitric acid on his victims despite their cooperation, disfiguring and in some cases blinding them, but tensions run high when other Central Division officers seek retribution over justice when it comes to catching the robber. Meanwhile, a teenage drug addict runs away from home, believing her age will protect her from real legal consequences, but her parents' insistence on releasing her to their care leads her to more trouble.
39	13	"The Killing"	Charles Bail	Burton Armus	June 17, 1991
In the days after an officer from Central Division is killed, Doyle and Grant are called to assist officers after a domestic dispute gone wrong, and Grant shoots and kills the suspect, Christopher Slayton. The shooting is investigated by internal affairs, and though Doyle and Cruz reassure Grant the shooting was justified, and the investigation clears him of wrongdoing, he is shaken by the experience and feels Slayton did not deserve to die. Only after Cruz hears him out and he stops a knife-wielding suspect goading him to shoot does Grant manage to come to terms with what happened.
40	14	"A Coalition of Fear"	Charles Bail	Carlton Hollander & Dennis Rodriguez	June 24, 1991
Thomas Lane (Harold Sylvester), an African American city councilor and candidate for Lieutenant Governor of California, discovers the body of Sondra Green, a close Lane campaign supporter who was raped and murdered at a university campus surrounded by a predominantly black neighborhood. Lane's insinuation that the assailant was a black area resident, and his proposition to ban outsiders from tertiary campuses, heightens racial tensions, which Lane seeks to exploit to propel his campaign. Doyle and Grant learn Green was pregnant with Lane's child in an affair and uncover discrepancies in Lane's story; the officers confront Lane in his office, and the LAPD investigates his possible connection with Green's murder.
41	15	"Families"	Sidney Hayers	Stan Berkowitz	July 1, 1991
When Doyle and Grant apprehend a drunk man outside a closed bar, trouble arises after his wife reveals he left the house with their baby in their station wagon, but he has forgotten where it is. Meanwhile, the officers come across an Alzheimer's-afflicted elderly man from Miami, but his uncaring relatives refuse to take him in; and a woman refuses to leave a domestic abuser because he is the only person who has ever shown any degree of care for her.
42	16	"Playing with Fire"	Sidney Hayers	Rick Kelbaugh	July 8, 1991
The LAPD handles a serial bomber who rigs random telephone booths with pressure-activated explosives. In one incident, Grant and the bomb squad rescue a claustrophobic woman trapped in a rigged phone booth. Meanwhile, a young girl runs away from home to escape child sexual abuse committed by her father and ignored by her mother; and a woman and her children seek police assistance in helping them leave her devastated husband, who promptly kills himself.
43	17	"Bad Blood"	Charles Bail	Alan Moskowitz	July 15, 1991
Officer Eddie Doogan (Will Bledsoe) learns he contracted AIDS from tainted blood he received after being shot years prior, and begins to act recklessly under the rationale he will die anyway. Doyle and Grant try to support Doogan, but the other officers at Central Division distance themselves from him because they do not know what to say to him. Though Doyle, Grant and Cruz support Doogan and Grant offers to be reassigned as his partner, they discover he has killed himself at his home.
44	18	"Drive-By"	Charles Bail	Gregory S. Dinallo	July 22, 1991
Drive-by shootings of random parked cars plague a gang-ridden neighborhood, which the LAPD suspects is the work of the Durangos, a Hispanic gang at war with the Blades, a rival African American gang. Doyle and Grant's investigation leads them to Lucinda Caralis (Tasia Valenza), a youth gang services counselor with the Los Angeles County Probation Department who insists neither of the gangs are responsible, a theory confirmed when a supervised meeting provides both gangs with alibis and a teenage girl is shot in a drive-by on neutral territory. The testimony of a homeless man disliked by local residents leads Doyle and Grant to a local mechanic seeking to boost business by damaging cars.
45	19	"Homeless in America"	Sidney Hayers	Caliope Brattlestreet & Stephen Glantz	July 29, 1991
Doyle and Grant investigate attacks on homeless people in Van Nuys, but the refusal of a local private hospital to treat the victims and the previous dismissiveness of police leads to a lack of cooperation from the area's homeless population. One victim's testimony leads to the apprehension of the suspects, two restaurant owners who view the homeless as nuisances. Meanwhile, a desperate father asks the officers to arrest his drug-addicted son; and a troubled student kills his friend for calling his mother a hooker, an allegation that turns out to be true.
46	20	"No Mercy"	Sidney Hayers	Elliot Anderson	August 5, 1991
Doyle and Grant try to help a desperate impoverished elderly woman avoid self-incrimination for eating food from supermarkets without paying. Meanwhile, a woman sick of a local drug-dealing gang tries to rally her neighborhood to push them out by any means necessary; and a man takes a nurse hostage after unplugging his comatose wife's life support in an attempt to end her suffering.
47	21	"Anatomy of a Rape"	Charles Bail	Nancy Ann Miller	August 12, 1991
Doyle and Grant try to help Michelle Brown (Mariska Hargitay), a traumatized victim of a vicious rape, but a womanizing witness and uncaring treatment convince her not to testify out of fear. Meanwhile, a man tries to shoot down passing helicopters for spraying pesticides; and a fatal head-on collision occurs when a drunk motorist hits a wrong-way driver.
48	22	"Missing"	Charles Bail	Joseph Gunn	August 19, 1991
Central Division is alerted to search for a missing child, who Doyle and Grant find locked in an old refrigerator in the scrap-filled backyard of an uncaring neighbor. Meanwhile, a Good Samaritan is beaten to death for trying to stop a domestic assault in a crowded park, and Doyle and Grant are disgusted by the consensus among the witnesses and even the suspect's abused girlfriend that he "should have minded his own business"; and a drafter breaks into an auto garage that went bankrupt while working on his van in an attempt to retrieve it, but the bank that seized the garage insists the van is now their property.
49	23	"Addictions"	Georg Fenady	Stan Berkowitz	August 26, 1991
While investigating illegal immigrants in an abandoned building, Doyle and Grant find a smuggler of both migrants and drugs. Among the smuggled migrants is a former high school classmate of Doyle's who is now a homeless alcoholic. Meanwhile, a drug overdose upsets the victim's disbelieving family.
50	24	"Deadly Trade"	Georg Fenady	Carlton Hollander	September 2, 1991
A sadist goes out with prostitutes to viciously assault them instead of having sex. Meanwhile, an elderly man with various ailments goes missing and is found relaxing at a hotel, seeking to live out the rest of his life away from his overbearing children; and a young boy accidentally shoots his friend in the eye with a BB gun, but their parents clash at the station over who is responsible.
51	25	"The Bully"	Charles Bail	Burton Armus	September 9, 1991
Adam-12 is dispatched to assist Detective Mangly (William Lucking), a forgery detective who roughs up two drug dealers outside his jurisdiction and assignment. Though Doyle and Grant initially side with him, they become suspicious when they and Cruz look into him. After witnessing Mangly chase and beat someone he presumes is a dealer, they learn he is trying to avenge his daughter, who died of a crack overdose. Meanwhile, a woman shoots and kills a home intruder at her window without hesitation, but is distraught to find it was her son trying to enter the house.
52	26	"The Fighter"	Charles Bail	Elliot Anderson	September 16, 1991
Doyle and Grant attempt to assist ex-gangster Danny Rodriguez (Carlos Gómez) get Louis (Richard Coca), a troubled youth who frequents a police boxing gym, out of the gang life, but their attempts at helping him become complicated when a gang harasses Louis and Rodriguez. Throughout the day, the officers discuss Phil Meadows, a cop killer on death row who controversially receives a stay of execution. Meanwhile, a teenager steals and crashes his father's car, and is arrested when cannabis is found inside.
