= Blue Skies Again =

- Theatrical release poster
- Directed by: Richard Michaels
- Written by: Kevin Sellers
- Produced by: Arlene Sellers; Alex Winitsky
- Starring: Harry Hamlin; Mimi Rogers; Kenneth McMillan; Robyn Barto; Dana Elcar; Joseph Gian
- Cinematography: Donald McAlpine
- Edited by: Danford B. Greene
- Music by: John Kander
- Production company: Lantana Productions
- Distributed by: Warner Bros. Pictures
- Release date: July 29, 1983
- Running time: 96 minutes
- Country: United States
- Language: English

Blue Skies Again is a 1983 American sports comedy film directed by Richard Michaels and written by Kevin Sellers. The film stars Harry Hamlin, Mimi Rogers, Kenneth McMillan, Robyn Barto, Dana Elcar, and Joseph Gian. It is Andy García's feature film debut. The film was released by Warner Bros. Pictures on July 29, 1983.

== Plot ==
A young female softball player, Paula Fradkin, is obsessed with baseball and travels to Fort Lauderdale during Spring Training and tries to convince the Denver Devils' owner Sandy and manager Lou to let her try out for the team.

Her assault on the Major Leagues' gender barrier is finally made possible when team owner Sandy, a male-chauvinist and bachelor, is attracted to Fradkin's personal manager Liz.

Paula performs well in training, but the fact that the new player at second base is female leads to resentment among both players and officials. Eventually coach Dirk calls on Paula to bat in a game and she responds with a base hit.

== Cast ==
- Harry Hamlin as Sandy Mendenhall
- Mimi Rogers as Liz West
- Kenneth McMillan as Dirk Miller
- Robyn Barto as Paula Fradkin
- Dana Elcar as Lou Goff
- Joseph Gian as Calvin Berry
- Doug Moeller as Carroll Brezki
- Tommy Lane as Roy "The Boy" Williams
- Andy García as Ken Lagarmarsino
- Marcos Gonzales as Chico "Brushback" Carrasco
- Cylk Cozart as Alvin "Wallstreet" Chandler
- Jerry Richardson as Dick Dent

== See also ==
- List of baseball films
