= Kenneth McMillan (actor) =

American actor

- Kenneth McMillan on TV's Rhoda (1977)
- Born: July 2, 1932; Brooklyn, New York, U.S.
- Died: January 8, 1989 (aged 56); Santa Monica, California, U.S.
- Occupation: Actor
- Years active: 1969–1989
- Spouse: Kathryn McDonald (m. 1969)
- Children: 1

Kenneth McMillan (July 2, 1932 – January 8, 1989) was an American actor. McMillan was usually cast as gruff, hostile and unfriendly characters due to his rough image. However, he was sometimes cast in some lighter comic roles that highlighted his gentler side. He was perhaps best known as Jack Doyle in Rhoda (1977–1978), and as Baron Vladimir Harkonnen in David Lynch's Dune.

== Biography ==
McMillan was born in Brooklyn, New York, the son of Margaret and Harry McMillan, a truck driver. He attended Fiorello H. LaGuardia High School of Music & Art and Performing Arts. Prior to becoming an actor, McMillan was employed at Gimbels Department Store first as a salesman, then as a section manager, and then a floor superintendent managing three floors. At age 30, McMillan decided to pursue an acting career, and took acting lessons from Uta Hagen and Irene Dailey. He was married to Kathryn McDonald (June 20, 1969 – January 8, 1989) (his death) with whom he had one child, actress Alison McMillan.

=== Career ===
McMillan made his film debut at age 41 with a small role in Sidney Lumet's police drama Serpico. The actor played a borough commander in The Taking of Pelham One Two Three, but often was cast as characters such as a cowardly small town sheriff in Tobe Hooper's 1979 TV mini-series Salem's Lot, a similar law enforcement officer in the 1987 Burt Reynolds film Malone, William Hurt's bitter paraplegic father in Eyewitness, a wily safe cracker in The Pope of Greenwich Village, and a racist fire chief in Ragtime who is memorably told off by the New York City police commissioner, played by James Cagney. In 1985, he portrayed New York City's newly appointed police commissioner in the short-lived television crime drama Our Family Honor.

He portrayed the grotesquely obese and gleefully psychotic Baron Vladimir Harkonnen in Dune, the pathetic drunken pop of Aidan Quinn in Reckless, and Cressner, a sleazy high-roller gambler in "The Ledge," a segment of the horror anthology film Cat's Eye. Yet he did sometimes get cast opposite the villain, playing Robert Duvall's detective partner in True Confessions, a judge who must rule whether Richard Dreyfuss has the right to die in Whose Life Is It Anyway?, as well as a lead detective investigating a serial killer in the 1982 film The Clairvoyant.

McMillan was also adept at comedy, giving performances as a baseball club manager in Blue Skies Again, Meg Ryan's corrupt security guard captain dad in Armed and Dangerous and a dotty senile veterinarian in Three Fugitives.

McMillan had a recurring role in 1977–1978 as Valerie Harper's irate boss Jack Doyle on the TV sitcom Rhoda. Among the TV shows McMillan did guest spots on are Dark Shadows, Ryan's Hope, as a 53rd precinct lieutenant on Kojak, Starsky & Hutch, The Rockford Files, Moonlighting, Lou Grant, Magnum, P.I. and Murder, She Wrote.

Outside of his film and TV credits, McMillan also frequently performed on stage at the New York Shakespeare Festival. He acted in the original Broadway productions of Streamers and American Buffalo. He won an Obie for his performance in the Off-Broadway play Weekends Like Other People.

McMillan died of liver disease at age 56.

== Filmography ==
Film

Year	Title	Role	Notes
1973	Serpico	Charlie	Uncredited
1974	The Taking of Pelham One Two Three	Harry (Borough Commander)	
1975	The Stepford Wives	Market Manager	
1975	Dog Day Afternoon	Commissioner	Uncredited
1978	Girlfriends	Cabbie	Credited as Ken McMillan
1978	Bloodbrothers	Mikey Banion	
1978	Oliver's Story	Jamie Francis	
1979	Chilly Scenes of Winter	Pete	
1980	Hide in Plain Sight	Sam Marzetta	
1980	Little Miss Marker	Branigan	
1980	Carny	Heavy St. John	
1980	Borderline	Malcolm Wallace	
1981	Eyewitness	Mr. Deever	
1981	True Confessions	Frank Crotty	
1981	Ragtime	Willie Conklin	
1981	Whose Life Is It Anyway?	Judge Wyler	
1981	Heartbeeps	Max	
1982	Partners	Chief Wilkins	
1982	The Clairvoyant	Detective Cullum	
1983	Blue Skies Again	Dirk	
1984	Reckless	John Rourke Sr.	
1984	The Pope of Greenwich Village	Barney	
1984	Amadeus	Michael Schlumberg	Director's Cut (2002)
1984	Dune	Baron Vladimir Harkonnen	
1984	Protocol	Senator Norris	
1985	Cat's Eye	Cressner	
1985	Runaway Train	Eddie MacDonald	
1986	Armed and Dangerous	Captain Clarence O'Connell	
1987	Malone	Hawkins	
1989	Three Fugitives	Horvath	

Television

Year	Title	Role	Notes
1969	Dark Shadows	Jack Long	Episode #899
1970	Dark Shadows	Bartender at the Eagle	Episode #991
1975–1976	Ryan's Hope	Charlie Ferris	17 episodes
1976	Kojak	Lieutenant Becker	Season 4 Episode 9: "A Shield for Murder: Part 1"; Season 4 Episode 10: "A Shield for Murder: Part 2"
1977	Johnny, We Hardly Knew Ye	Softy McNamara	TV movie
1977	The Rubber Gun Squad	Captain Egan	TV pilot movie
1977–1978	Rhoda	Jack Doyle	Recurring (24 episodes) (also performer on "Blue Moon" and "As Time Goes By" in 2 episodes)
1978	Kojak	Lieutenant George O'Mara	Season 5 Episode 17: "No License to Kill"
1978	Breaking Up	Vancrier	TV movie
1978	King	Theophilus Eugene "Bull" Connor	Miniseries (Season 1 Episodes 1, 2, 3) (credit only for Episode 3)
1978	A Death in Canaan	Sergeant Tim Scully	TV movie
1978	Starsky & Hutch	Lieutenant Daniel E. Slate	Season 4 Episode 6: "Strange Justice"
1978	The Rockford Files	Morry Hawthorne	Season 5 Episode 10: "A Fast Count"
1979	Lou Grant	Jack Riley	Season 2 Episode 20: "Convention"
1979	Salem's Lot	Constable Parkins Gillespie	Miniseries (Season 1 Episodes Part 1, Part 2)
1980	The Hustler of Muscle Beach	Joseph Demec	TV movie
1982	In the Custody of Strangers	Albert C. Caruso	TV movie
1983	Packin' It In	Howard Estep	TV movie
1983	Dixie: Changing Habits	Tony Marchesso	TV movie
1983	Murder 1, Dancer 0	Lieutenant Herbie Quinlan	TV movie
1984	When She Says No	Mr. Michaels	TV movie
1984	Maggie Briggs	Walter Holden	Main (5 episodes)
1984	Concrete Beat	Marion Kaiser	TV movie
1984	Destination Dune	Self / Baron Vladimir Harkonnen	TV documentary short promoting Dune
1985–1986	Our Family Honor	Commissioner Patrick McKay	Main (13 episodes)
1986	Acceptable Risks	Wes Boggs	TV movie
1986	Alfred Hitchcock Presents	Judge Paul Magrew	Season 1 Episode 21: "Four O'Clock"
1986	Moonlighting	Baptista	Season 3 Episode 7: "Atomic Shakespeare"
1987	CBS Summer Playhouse	Harry Gunz	Season 1 Episode 19: "Sons of Gunz"
1987	Murder, She Wrote	Season 4 Episode 2: "When Thieves Fall Out"	
1987	Magnum, P.I.	Joe Hatten	Season 8 Episode 3: "Innocence... A Broad"
1987	Tales from the Hollywood Hills: A Table at Ciro's	Lew Carteret	TV movie
1988	Frank's Place	Mitch Torrance	Season 1 Episode 22: "The King of Wall Street" (credited as Ken McMillan)
1988	Favorite Son	Henry O'Brien	Season 1 Episode 1: "Part One"
1989	Top of the Hill	Steele Cooley	Season 1 Episode 1: "Top of the Hill"
1997	Welcome to Twin Peaks	Baron Vladimir Harkonnen	Archive footage; uncredited
2013	The Calm Before the Chaos: Kyle T. Heffner Reflects on Runaway Train	Eddie MacDonald	Archive footage; uncredited
