= Joseph Gian =

American singer

Joseph Giangrosso
- Also known as: Joey Gian
- Born: July 13, 1961 (age 64)
- Origin: North Miami Beach, Florida, U.S.
- Genres: Easy listening Soundtracks; Soul
- Occupation(s): Vocalist songwriter actor
- Years active: 1986–present
- Labels: Various (USA)
- Website: JoeyGian.com

Joseph Gian (born July 13, 1961) is an American actor and singer, probably best known for his role as Detective Tom Ryan in the television series Knots Landing. He appeared on the program from 1989 to 1991 and again in 1993. Gian was the male vocalist champion in the 1986 edition of Star Search.

== Career ==
Gian played openly gay police officer Rick Silardi in the series Hooperman, which ran from 1987 to 1989. He also played Kenny Bannerman in several episodes of Beverly Hills, 90210 in 1996.

His film credits include roles in Blue Skies Again (1983), A Night in Heaven (1983), The Night Stalker (1987), Death Before Dishonor (1987), Blackout (1988), Mad About You (1989), and Return to Me (2000).

In more recent years, Gian has been performing in Las Vegas. He also sang the theme song of Special Agent Oso.

== Filmography ==
=== Film ===
Year	Title	Role	Notes
1983	Blue Skies Again	Calvin Berry	
1983	A Night in Heaven	Pete	
1986	The Night Stalker	Det. Buddy Brown	
1987	Death Before Dishonor	Sgt. Manuel Ramirez	
1988	Blackout	Luke Erikson	
1989	Mad About You	Joey	
2000	Return to Me	Singer	
2014	Henry & Me	Jack's Dad	
2017	But Deliver Us from Evil	Pastor Robert Knight	
2019	Bottom of the 9th	Fan	

=== Television ===
Year	Title	Role	Notes
1983	Happy Endings	Mario	Television film
1985	T. J. Hooker	Dave Walker	Episode: "Serial Murders"
1985	The Insiders	Kevin Foot	Episode: "After the Fox"
1985	Highway to Heaven	Dave Sanders	Episode: "Popcorn, Peanuts and CrackerJacks"
1987	One Big Family	Sam Hale	Episode: "The Big Bust"
1987	L.A. Law	Aaron Fein	Episode: "Oy Vey! Wilderness!"
1987	It's a Living	Scott	Episode: "Manhandling"
1987–1989	Hooperman	Officer Rick Silardi	42 episodes
1989–1993	Knots Landing	Det. Tom Ryan	43 episodes
1991	DEA	Dominic De Lasera	3 episodes
1994	Lois & Clark: The New Adventures of Superman	Clyde Barrow	Episode: "That Old Gang of Mine"
1996	Beverly Hills, 90210	Kenny Bannerman	9 episodes
1997	Women: Stories of Passion	Clay	Episode: "Mind's Eye"
1999	V.I.P.	Rene Batiste	Episode: "Escape from Val-catraz"
2000	Godzilla: The Series	Co-Pilot (voice)	Episode: "Vision"
2000	Blood Money	Joey Restrelli	Television film
2003	Life with Bonnie	Joey Knuckles	Episode: "Places, Stat!"
2007	Higglytown Heroes	Brick Layer Hero (voice)	Episode: "Tis the Season to Be Ducky"
