= Arthur L. Annecharico =

American film director

- Occupation(s): Producer, director, and writer
- Known for: Television and film production

Arthur L. Annecharico is a producer, director and writer. He is known for having produced revivals of popular 1960s television series in the 1990s, namely The Munsters, Dragnet, and Adam-12.

Annecharico's involvement in the entertainment industry has spanned more than 32 years. His company, The Arthur Company, had a multimillion-dollar partnership with MCA TV for development of new productions across the board in film and television, with more than $40,000,000 in on-the-air commitments in the late 1980s and early 1990s.

== Career ==
Before forming The Arthur Company, Annecharico was appointed the head of comedy development for Metromedia Producers Co. and then president of Cinemaworld Productions. On network television, his first credit as a co-creator was for the 1983 CBS TV movie Ace Diamond, Private Eye (1983). Shortly after, Annecharico entered into a deal with Turner Broadcasting Systems to develop half-hour sitcoms at one-fourth of the cost of network television programs.

With the development of Down to Earth (1984–1987), the first sitcom he produced for TBS, Annecharico formed The Arthur Company as his production arm. Down to Earth, which was created by Star Search grand champion singer Sam Harris and Bruce H. Newberg, was immediately successful on TBS, and soon, two other sitcoms from The Arthur Company followed on the cable network: Rocky Road (1984–1987), which was created and produced by Annecharico, and Safe at Home (1985–1987).

Aside from these three series, Annecharico had other sitcom pilots in development at TBS, including The O'Briens (1985), which starred Darren McGavin as a work-from-home sports journalist and widower raising his three sons, who were played by Peter Billingsley (McGavin's co-star from A Christmas Story), Sean Astin, and Jason Hervey; and Here to Stay (1986), a comedy about a grandfather (Robert Mandan) who moves with his daughter's yuppie family. The cast featured Heather O'Rourke, Jerry Houser, Dianne Kay, and Nanette Fabray. Neither of these projects were picked up as series.

The Arthur Company finished a £28,000,000 order for 271 half-hour sitcom episodes for TBS and a $10,000,000 order for 24 episodes of the hour-long action adventure series, Airwolf, for USA Network.

Annecharico produced the syndicated sitcom The Munsters Today (also known as The New Munsters) for three seasons from 1988 to 1991. The pilot episode bridged the gap between the original 1966 The Munsters series and the new The Munsters Today show. The show's second season was met with some criticism from Munster fans as Annecharico changed the format of the show's first season and the original series to bring the Munster family into the 1990s. While the show continued to use its original premise, notable changes were made.

In 1989 and 1990, Annecharico produced two 26-episode season revivals of the Jack Webb series Dragnet and Adam-12. These series, The New Dragnet and The New Adam-12 respectively, had completely different characters, music, and formats from the original Mark VII series, and only ran for a single year each.

Annecharico produced the films Run For Blue, The Eagle, and Grains of Sand. In network television, he is credited with What a Dummy, The Deepest Dive, and The Huddle. His writing credits include the features Camp Bow Wow, Father Forgive Me, and the television special Tanya.

== Awards ==
Annecharico is a three-time Emmy Award recipient.

Annecharico was the recipient of the 1988 Salvation Army Evangeline Booth Award; Annecharico also serves on the California Salvation Army Board of Directors.

Annecharico is the recipient of awards of recognition from Mothers Against Drunk Drivers for the donated production of 16 different public service announcements and has been recognized by both the City and County of Los Angeles for his contributions in anti-drunk driving campaigns.
