= The Court-Martial of Jackie Robinson =

1990 American TV film

- Screenplay by: L. Travis Clark; Steve Duncan; Clay Frohman; Dennis Lynton Clark
- Story by: L. Travis Clark; Steve Duncan
- Directed by: Larry Peerce
- Starring: Andre Braugher; Daniel Stern; Ruby Dee; Stan Shaw; Paul Dooley; Bruce Dern
- Composer: Stanley Clarke
- Country of origin: United States
- Original language: English

Production
- Producer: L. Travis Clark
- Cinematography: Don Burgess
- Editors: Eric A. Sears; Bob Wyman
- Running time: 100 minutes
- Production companies: Turner Pictures; Von Zerneck Sertner Films

Original release
- Network: TNT
- Release: October 15, 1990

The Court-Martial of Jackie Robinson is a 1990 American drama film directed by Larry Peerce and written by L. Travis Clark, Steve Duncan, Clay Frohman and Dennis Lynton Clark. The film stars Andre Braugher, Daniel Stern, Ruby Dee, Stan Shaw, Paul Dooley and Bruce Dern. The film premiered on TNT on October 15, 1990.

== Plot ==
The movie opens in 1944, when Jackie Robinson is serving as a second lieutenant in the U.S. Army during World War II. Robinson and the other Black officers face discrimination and segregation, despite putting their lives on the line. After refusing to move to the back of a segregated Army bus, Robinson is court-martialed for insubordination.

The movie then flashes back to Robinson's early life and baseball career before the war. We see his athletic talents develop and how he became one of the first Black players in professional baseball when he joined the Kansas City Monarchs in the Negro Leagues. However, his career is put on hold when he is drafted into the Army in 1942.

Back at the court-martial, the all-white panel of officers seems set on harshly punishing Robinson as an example to other Black servicemen. Robinson argues eloquently in his own defense, pointing out the hypocrisy of fighting a war against racism overseas while tolerating discrimination at home. His impassioned testimony helps sway the panel, who ultimately vote to acquit Robinson, though they still reprimand him.

The movie ends with Robinson leaving the Army and resuming his baseball career with the Montreal Royals, the farm team for the Brooklyn Dodgers. Just a few years later in 1947, he would break baseball's color barrier and become a civil rights icon as the first Black player in Major League Baseball. The movie underscores Robinson's dignity and leadership in the face of injustice, which paved the way for integration in sports and society.

== Cast ==
- Andre Braugher as Jackie Robinson
- Daniel Stern as William Cline
- Ruby Dee as Jackie's mother
- Stan Shaw as Joe Louis
- Paul Dooley as Willy Bailey
- Bruce Dern as Scout Ed Higgins
- Kasi Lemmons as Rachel
- J. A. Preston as Wendell Smith
- Michael Greene
- Dale Dye
- Steven Williams as Satchel Paige
- Noble Willingham
- Gary Grubbs
- Don Hood as Maj. Foley
- Howard French as Sgt. McEllroy
- Jim Beaver as Maj. Trimble
- Russell Curry as Mack at 21
- Peter Parros as Gordon Jones
- Nancy Cheryll Davis as Loretta Jones
- Dale Swann as Dr. Smith
- Glenn Morshower as Capt. Spencer
- Brenda Ballard as Miss Wharton
- Ken Kerman as Asch
- Chris Kinkade as Cpl. Dwight

== See also ==
- List of baseball films
