= Terry Leonard =

American stunt performer and second unit director (born 1940)

- Born: 1940 (age 85–86); West Allis, Wisconsin, US
- Education: University of Arizona
- Occupations: Stunt performer; Second unit director
- Notable credit: See selected filmography
- Awards: Golden Boot Award (2003); Taurus Lifetime Achievement Award (2003
- Football career

Profile
- Position: Halfback

Personal information
- Listed height: 6 ft 1 in (1.85 m)
- Listed weight: 210 lb (95 kg)

Career information
- College: Arizona Wildcats football (1961–1962); Milwaukee Cardinals football (1960)

Career history
- BC Lions (1966)

Terry James Leonard (born 1940) is an American stunt performer and second unit director.

== Biography ==
Leonard was born and raised in West Allis, Wisconsin, where he was raised on a farm. He attended the University of Wisconsin–Milwaukee and then transferred to the University of Arizona. He also played college football, was a member of the track and field team, and competed in the 1960 and 1964 Olympic trials for decathlon. From 1964 to 1966, he played minor league American football in the United Football League, the Continental Football League, and the Professional Football League of America. In 1966, he was signed as a halfback by the BC Lions of the Canadian Football League. His football career ended that same year when he suffered from a herniated disc.

In need of work, Leonard contacted the stunt performer Chuck Roberson, whom he had watched perform stunts while working as an extra on McLintock! in 1963. Roberson invited Leonard to live with him in Los Angeles. He taught Leonard how to be a stunt performer, including teaching him horse stunts in his back yard. He later trained with the martial artist Joe Lewis and learned to drive race cars so that he could expand his work beyond Western films.

Leonard debuted as a stunt performer by falling from a church steeple in El Dorado (1966). His most famous stunt was during the truck chase sequence in Raiders of the Lost Ark (1981), when—doubling for Harrison Ford—he jumped from a horse and climbed underneath the truck. Steven Spielberg said that Leonard "took some pretty nasty spills" while filming the sequence. In Romancing the Stone (1984), Leonard drove off a waterfall in a Jeep as Michael Douglas's stunt double. Throughout his career, he has been a close collaborator of John Milius, directing stunts in all of his films.

Leonard has received critical and professional acclaim. In 2003, Leonard received the Golden Boot Award for his work on Western films and the Taurus Lifetime Achievement Award for his stunt work. Writing for The Washington Post, Sharon Waxman called Leonard "one of the most famous and respected stunt coordinators in Hollywood". The Los Angeles Times called him a "legend" in stunt performance.

As of 2008, Leonard lived on a ranch in Agua Dulce, California, and competed in rodeo.

== Selected filmography ==
- Gangster Squad (2013): stunts, second unit director
- Cowboys & Aliens (2011): second unit director
- The Expendables (2010): second unit director
- The Fast and the Furious: Tokyo Drift (2006): second unit director
- 2 Fast 2 Furious (2003): second unit director
- Rush Hour (1998): stunts, second unit director
- Eraser (1996): second unit director
- Die Hard With a Vengeance (1995): stunts, second unit director
- The Quick and the Dead (1995): stunts, second unit director
- The Fugitive (1993): second unit director
- Showdown in Little Tokyo (1991): stunts, second unit director
- Flight of the Intruder (1991): stunts, second unit director
- The Package (1989): stunts, second unit director
- Farewell to the King (1989): stunts, second unit director
- Death Before Dishonor (1987): director
- Cobra (1986): stunts, second unit director
- Red Dawn (1984): stunts, second unit director
- Romancing the Stone (1984): stunts, second unit director
- Conan the Barbarian: stunts, horse riding double: Arnold Schwarzenegger, second unit director
- Raiders of the Lost Ark (1981): stunts
- Used Cars (1980): stunts, second unit director
- Apocalypse Now (1979): stunts
- Big Wednesday (1978): stunts, second unit director: land

== Sources ==
- "Death Before Dishonor (1987)". AFI Catalog of Feature Films. n.d. Archived from the original on April 16, 2025.
- "Terry J. Leonard". AFI Catalog of Feature Films. n.d. Archived from the original on June 21, 2026.
- Champlin, Charles (March 16, 1986). "The Adrenaline Junkies: Movie Stunt Men and Women Get Paid to Leap From Buildings and Crash Cars". Los Angeles Times. Archived from the original on March 10, 2026.
- Conley, Kevin (2009) [2008]. The Full Burn: On the Set, at the Bar, Behind the Wheel, and Over the Edge with Hollywood Stuntmen. New York: Bloomsbury USA. ISBN 978-1-59691-024-9.
- Freese, Gene Scott (2014). "Terry Leonard (1940– )". Hollywood Stunt Performers, 1910s–1970s: A Biographical Dictionary (2nd ed.). Jefferson, North Carolina: McFarland & Company. pp. 167–169. ISBN 978-0-7864-7643-5.
- King, Susan (May 16, 2015). "Classic Hollywood: Stuntman Terry Leonard's Career Grew by Leaps and Bounds in Hollywood". Los Angeles Times. Archived from the original on December 8, 2024.
- Leotta, Alfio (2019). The Cinema of John Milius. Lanham, Massachusetts: Lexington Books. ISBN 978-1-4985-4372-9.
- McCarthy, Todd (June 6, 2003). "2 Fast 2 Furious". Variety. Archived from the original on July 26, 2025.
- McCarthy, Todd (June 14, 2006). "The Fast and the Furious: Tokyo Drift". Variety. Archived from the original on February 9, 2026.
- Oldenburg, Ann (June 6, 2003). "Still Willing to Take the Fall". USA Today. p. E1. ProQuest 408877053.
- "Terry Leonard Pro Football Record". Pro Football Archives. n.d. Archived from the original on June 18, 2026.
- Spielberg, Steven (November 1981). "'Of Narrow Misses and Close Calls'". American Cinematographer. Vol. 62, no. 11. pp. 1100–1102, 1138–1142, 1160–1168. ProQuest 196335187.
- "Lifetime Achievement". Taurus World Stunt Awards. n.d.
- Verrier, Richard; Huffstutter, P. J. (September 2, 2003). "A New Risk in the World of Film Stunts". Los Angeles Times. Archived from the original on May 6, 2021.
- Waxman, Sharon (November 16, 2003). "Hollywood's Rein Men". The Washington Post.
- "Playmate for Willie at B.C.?". Winnipeg Free Press. Canada Press. June 3, 1966. p. 37.
