= Blackout (1988 film) =

- Directed by: Doug Adams
- Written by: Laura Ferguson; Joseph Stefano
- Produced by: Doug Adams; Herman Grigsby; Joseph Stefano
- Starring: Gail O'Grady; Carol Lynley
- Cinematography: Arledge Armenaki
- Edited by: Zach Staenberg
- Music by: Don Davis
- Production company: Ambient Light Enterprises
- Distributed by: Overseas FilmGroup
- Release date: October 29, 1988
- Running time: 87 minutes
- Country: United States
- Language: English

Blackout (released as The Attic in UK) is a 1988 American thriller film directed by Doug Adams and starring Gail O'Grady and Carol Lynley.

== Premise ==
Caroline Boyle is drawn to her childhood home in Northern California by a cryptic letter from her father, who abandoned her and her mother when she was a child. She comes back to search for her father, but gradually her terrible suppressed memories return.

== Cast ==
- Gail O'Grady as Caroline Boyle
- Carol Lynley as Esther Boyle
- Michael Keys Hall as Alan Boyle
- Joseph Gian as Luke Erikson
- Deena Freeman as Angela Carpenter
- Joanna Miles as Eleanor Carpenter
- Scott Lincoln as Richard Boyle

== Production ==
Principal photography started in the spring of 1987, with exteriors filmed in Santa Paula, California, while four different houses in Pasadena and Altadena served as interiors. The film had a budget of just under $2 million.
