= Max Kleven =

Norwegian-American stuntman (1933–2026)

- Born: August 16, 1933; Trondheim, Norway
- Died: June 3, 2026 (aged 92); Valencia, California, U.S.
- Occupations: Second unit director, stuntman, actor, director

Michael J. Kleven (August 16, 1933 – June 3, 2026) was a Norwegian-born American second unit director, stuntman, actor, and director.

== Life and career ==
Kleven was born in Trondheim, Norway, on August 16, 1933. He is known for his work as a stuntman in the Back to the Future series, Batman Returns, Wild Wild West and Bean. He was also second unit director for Who Framed Roger Rabbit, Back to the Future Part II, Back to the Future Part III, Robin Hood: Prince of Thieves, Batman Forever, and The River Wild.

Kleven died in Valencia, California, on June 3, 2026, at the age of 92.
