= The Last Voyage =

1960 film by Andrew L. Stone

- theatrical release poster
- Directed by: Andrew L. Stone
- Written by: Andrew L. Stone
- Produced by: Andrew L. Stone; Virginia L. Stone
- Starring: Robert Stack; Dorothy Malone; George Sanders; Edmond O'Brien
- Cinematography: Hal Mohr
- Edited by: Virginia L. Stone
- Music by: Rudy Schrager; Uncredited: Andrew L. Stone; Virginia L. Stone
- Production company: Andrew L. Stone Inc.
- Distributed by: Metro-Goldwyn-Mayer
- Release dates: February 19, 1960 (New York City); February 24, 1960 (Los Angeles)
- Running time: 91 minutes
- Country: United States
- Language: English
- Budget: $1,370,000 or $1 million
- Box office: $2,060,000

The Last Voyage is a 1960 Metrocolor American disaster film starring Robert Stack, Dorothy Malone, George Sanders, and Edmond O'Brien. It was written and directed by Andrew L. Stone. It was the first MGM film of the 1960s.

The film centers on the sinking of an aged ocean liner in the Pacific Ocean following an explosion in its boiler room.

The ship used in the film was the condemned French luxury liner SS Ile de France, which played a major role in rescue operations during the 1956 Andrea Doria disaster, off Nantucket, Massachusetts.

== Plot ==
The SS Claridon is an aging transpacific ocean liner, scheduled to be scrapped after just a few more voyages. Cliff (Robert Stack) and Laurie Henderson (Dorothy Malone), and their daughter, Jill (Tammy Marihugh), are relocating to Tokyo and decide to sail there on board the ship. A fire in the boiler room is extinguished, but not before a boiler fuel supply valve is fused open. Before Chief Engineer Pringle (Jack Kruschen) can manually open a steam relief valve, a huge explosion rips through the boiler room, the many decks situated above it, and the side of the ship. Pringle and a number of passengers are killed, and Laurie is trapped under a steel beam in their cabin.

Cliff runs back there and can't get Laurie out alone. He then finds Jill trapped on the other side of the big hole left by the explosion. He tries to use a shattered piece of the bed to get to the other side, but it falls through the hole. Third Officer Osborne believes that the crew should start loading the passengers into the lifeboats, but Captain Robert Adams (George Sanders) is reluctant, as he never lost a ship. Cliff rescues Jill by placing a board for her to crawl across the hole on. Down in the boiler room, Second Engineer Walsh (Edmond O'Brien) reports to Captain Adams that a seam to the bulkhead has broken away. Cliff tries to get a steward's help, but to no avail. A passenger states that he overheard his conversation and wants to help.

Osborne (George Furness) reports that the boiler room is now half full. The ship then begins to transmit an SOS, on orders of Captain Adams. Cliff and a few other men return to his cabin to try to help free Laurie but find that they need a cutting torch. The carpenter reports to the crew that the boiler room is now two-thirds full. Captain Adams makes an announcement to the passengers to put on their life jackets, and soon after reluctantly orders the crew to begin loading and launching the lifeboats.

Cliff finds a torch and tries to rush back to Laurie with the help of crewman Hank Lawson (Woody Strode), but they still need an acetylene tank. On instruction from Cliff, Lawson puts Jill in a lifeboat and asks them to return with an acetylene tank. The bulkhead between the boiler room and the engine finally gives way, causing the ship to sink lower. On top of that, a second explosion occurs in the cargo hold, blowing off the cargo hatch on the bow of the ship.

Captain Adams is looking at his promotion letter to commodore of the line while Laurie holds a piece of a shattered mirror in her hand, contemplating suicide to free Cliff from risking his life to save her. She chooses not to do so and tosses it away.

Cliff and Lawson continue to search for a way to rescue Laurie, even recruiting Walsh's help, though the latter believes nothing can be done. Captain Adams returns to his office to retrieve the ship's logbook and papers but is killed when the forward smokestack falls on him. Meanwhile, a lifeboat returns with the acetylene tank and the group gets Laurie out from under the steel beam. Water pours into the open cargo hatch, and the ship begins its final plunge. They get up to the boat deck along with Osborne and Ragland. As they proceed to the stern where a lifeboat is standing by, Walsh jumps off the ship and swims away from it. Cliff, Laurie, Osborne, Ragland, and Lawson jump into the water and find a lifeboat just as the ship sinks. Cliff personally helps Lawson aboard, in thanks for his devotion to assisting Laurie's rescue, and the narrator concludes with, "This was the death of the steamship Claridon. This was her last voyage."

== Cast ==
- Robert Stack as Cliff Henderson
- Dorothy Malone as Laurie Henderson
- George Sanders as Captain Robert Adams
- Edmond O'Brien as Second Engineer Walsh
- Woody Strode as Hank Lawson
- Jack Kruschen as Chief Engineer Pringle
- Joel Marston as Third Officer Ragland
- George Furness as First Officer Osborne
- Tami Marihugh as Jill Henderson

== Production ==
Stuart Whitman was originally announced for the male lead, and Sidney Poitier for the role of Hank Lawson.

The film originally was scheduled to be shot in CinemaScope off the coast of England, but instead it was filmed almost entirely in the Inland Sea off the coast of Osaka causing noticeable consistency conflicts in the film. For example, in the beginning of the film all of the shipboard extras are of European origin however as the ship begins to sink,(and the outdoor filming moves to Inland Sea) a majority of the shipboard guests (extras) become Asian in origin (this is most notable in the obvious attempt to have the extras avert their faces from the camera).

The ship used in the film was the French luxury liner SS Ile de France, which had been in service from 1927 until 1959, when it was sold to a Japanese scrapyard. Its former owners initially attempted to block Stone's rental of it (for $1.5 million), but withdrew their opposition when MGM agreed not to identify it by its original name when publicizing the film. It was towed to shallow waters, where jets of water shot onto it from fire boats flooded forward compartments and made it appear that it was sinking by the bow. The forward funnel was sent crashing into the deckhouse and the Art Deco interiors were destroyed by explosives and/or flooded. Because of the poisonous jellyfish in the Inland Sea, the final lifeboat scene was filmed in Santa Monica, California.

A LIFE magazine essay about the ship's scrapyard fate—and the film's production—included many photographs and production details. For the climactic explosion scene, "the likeliest place seemed to be the bay of Sumoto, a port on the island of island of Awaji 20 miles away....But the insurance captain declared that it would be necessary to strengthen the bulkheads and install new steam lines before the liner could be allowed to make the trip....The work was done, causing another three days' delay and costing an additional $30,000.

In his autobiography Straight Shooting, Robert Stack recalled, "No special effects for Andy [Stone]; he actually planned to destroy a liner and photograph the process. Thus began a film called The Last Voyage, which...for yours truly very nearly lived up to its title." According to William H. Miller, American maritime historian, The French Line thereafter forbade any use of the ships they sold for scrap to be used for anything other than scrapping. After the film was finished, Japanese scrappers raised the ship and towed it to their scrapyard.

The film marked the third and final pairing of Stack and Dorothy Malone. They had previously costarred in the Douglas Sirk films Written on the Wind (1956) and The Tarnished Angels (1958).

== Box office ==
According to MGM records the film earned $1,060,000 in the US and Canada and $1 million elsewhere resulting in a $551,000 loss.

== Critical reception ==
Bosley Crowther of The New York Times called the film "exciting" and noted "the tension is held unrelentingly until the very end." He added, "Well, almost the end. Let's be honest. Things do finally come to a point where a reasonably realistic viewer is likely to mutter, 'Oh, no!' That's the point where the water in the stateroom is rising above Miss Malone's chin and Mr. Stack, Edmond O'Brien and Woody Strode are still working frantically with an acetylene tank to cut her free. Then the obvious desperation of the problem and the questionable buoyancy of the ship lead one to have misgivings about the reasonableness of Mr. Stone. But up to this point of departure, we have to hand it to him; he has put together a picture that has drama, conviction and suspense. Using as his setting the old condemned liner Ile de France...he has got an extraordinary feeling of the actuality of being aboard a ship, the creeping terror of a disaster, the agony of a great vessel's death. And in all of his performers, especially Miss Malone, he has got a moving reflection of frenzy, futility and fear."

The critic for Time called the film "the most violently overstimulating experience of the new year in cinema: an attempt by two shrewd shock merchants, Andrew and Virginia Stone...to give the mass audience a continuous, 91-minute injection of adrenaline. As a piece of professional entertainment, The Last Voyage is plainly superior to the picture it was patterned after, the British version of the loss of the Titanic. The script takes advantage of its fictional freedom, as the script of A Night to Remember could not, to focus its interest and excite its pace. The scenes of destruction are particularly explicit and dramatic. And yet, in its total effect, The Last Voyage lacks an element essential in all great disasters: dignity. Indeed, the idle depredation of a noble old ship, for the mere sake of salable sensation, may seem to some moviegoers an absolute indignity."

== Awards and nominations ==
Augie Lohman was nominated for the Academy Award for Best Visual Effects.

== See also ==
- List of American films of 1960
