= George Zuckerman =

American novelist

George Zuckerman (August 10, 1916 – September 30, 1996) was an American screenwriter and novelist.

Zuckerman began his career writing short stories for Cosmopolitan, Collier's Weekly, and Esquire in the 1940s. He wrote the stories for the 1947 films The Fortress and Whispering City before completing his first screenplay, Trapped, in 1949. Additional credits include Border Incident (1949), B-movies like Spy Hunt (1950) and The Square Jungle, and his best known works, Written on the Wind (1956) and The Tarnished Angels (1958), both collaborations with director Douglas Sirk (who also directed the 1954 film Taza, Son of Cochise, co-written by Zuckerman).

Zuckerman's published novels include The Last Flapper (1969), loosely based on the life of Zelda Fitzgerald and The Potato Peelers (1974).

Zuckerman died in Santa Monica, California one month after his 80th birthday.
