= Dorothy Malone =

American actress (1924–2018)

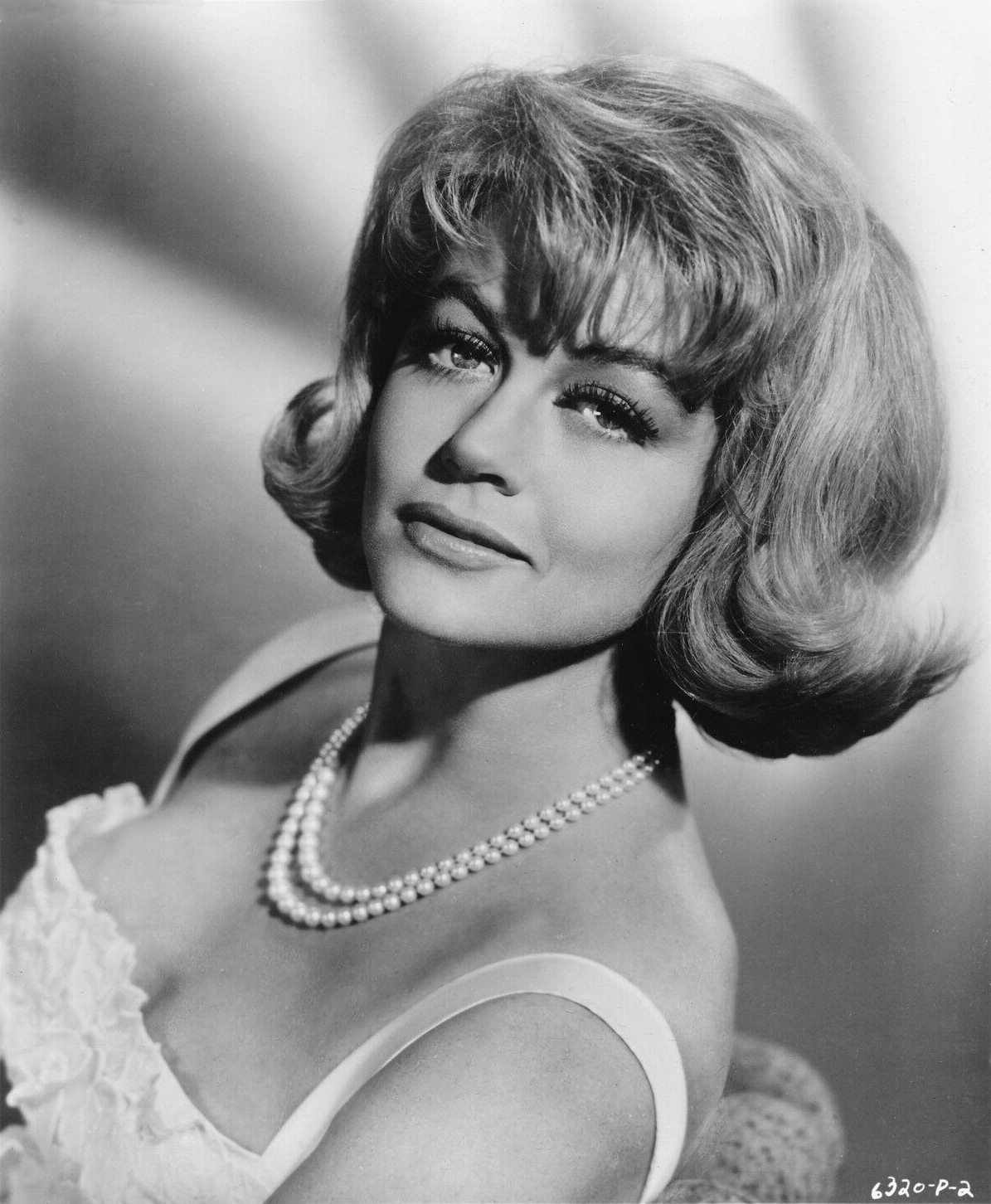
- Dorothy Malone, 1963
- Born: Mary Dorothy Maloney; January 29, 1924; Chicago, Illinois, U.S.
- Died: January 19, 2018 (aged 93); Dallas, Texas, U.S.
- Education: Southern Methodist University
- Occupation: Actress
- Years active: 1943–1992
- Spouses: Jacques Bergerac (m. 1959; div. 1964) Robert Tomarkin (m. 1969; annul. 1969) Charles Huston Bell (m. 1971; div. 1973)
- Children: 2
- Relatives: Robert B. Maloney (brother)

Dorothy Malone (born Mary Dorothy Maloney; January 29, 1924 – January 19, 2018) was an American actress. Her film career began in 1943, and in her early years, she played small roles, mainly in B-movies, with the exception of a supporting role in The Big Sleep (1946). After a decade, she changed her image, particularly after her role in Written on the Wind (1956), for which she won the Academy Award for Best Supporting Actress.

Her career reached its peak by the beginning of the 1960s, and she achieved later success with her television role as Constance MacKenzie on Peyton Place (1964–1968). Less active in her later years, Malone's last screen appearance was in Basic Instinct in 1992.

== Early life ==
Malone was born Mary Dorothy Maloney on January 29, 1924, in Chicago, one of five children born to Esther Emma "Eloise" Smith and her husband Robert Ignatius Maloney, an auditor for AT&T Corporation.

When she was six months old, her family moved to Dallas, Texas. There she modeled for Neiman Marcus and attended Ursuline Academy of Dallas, Highland Park High School, Hockaday Junior College, and later, Southern Methodist University (SMU). She originally considered becoming a nurse. While performing in a play at SMU, she was spotted by a talent scout, Eddie Rubin, who had been looking to find and cast a male actor.

Malone recalled in 1981,

"I was minoring in drama because I always seemed to be in the plays produced in high school and college. ... I did some scenes with this boy the agent had found and pictures of the scenes were taken of the boy and also of me. A few weeks later, a 13-week [studio] contract arrived by mail with a six-year option."

== Career ==
=== RKO – as Dorothy Maloney ===
Malone was signed by RKO at age 18 as Dorothy Maloney. She made her film debut in Gildersleeve on Broadway (1943). She was credited as Dorothy Maloney in The Falcon and the Co-eds (1943), released shortly thereafter. She later recalled, "I was a bridesmaid at a wedding in one picture. In another film, I was the leader of an all-girl orchestra. The only thing I did at RKO of any note was lose my Texas accent." Her RKO appearances included Higher and Higher (1943) with Frank Sinatra, Seven Days Ashore (1944), Show Business (1944) with Eddie Cantor, Step Lively (1944) again with Sinatra, and Youth Runs Wild (1944) for producer Val Lewton. RKO elected not to renew her contract. She made a brief uncredited appearance in One Mysterious Night (1944), a Boston Blackie film for Columbia.

=== Warner Bros. – as Dorothy Malone ===
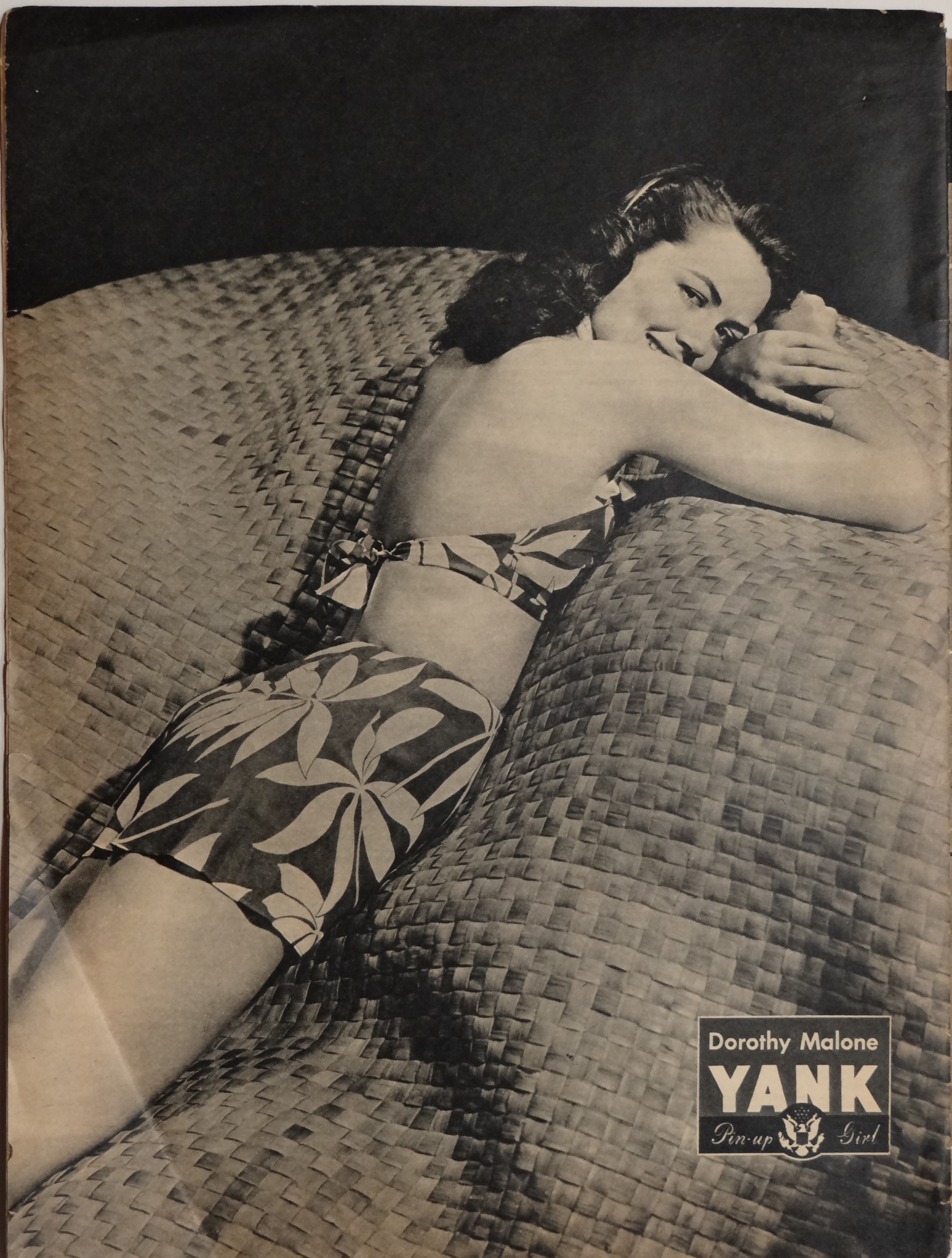
Pin-up photo of Malone for Yank, the Army Weekly in 1945

She then signed a contract with Warner Bros. The studio, she said in 1985, changed her surname "from Maloney to Malone. They placed my picture in the newspaper and they gave me a raise."

Malone banters with Humphrey Bogart in The Big Sleep, 1946.

Malone's early Warner movies included Hollywood Canteen (1944), Too Young to Know (1945), and Frontier Days (1945). She first achieved notice when Howard Hawks cast her as the bespectacled bookstore clerk in The Big Sleep (1946) with Humphrey Bogart. Dorothy Malone’s bookstore clerk is not named, but she doesn’t need one. As she engages with Marlowe about rare books he has researched, she becomes important to the narrative. Her character intuitively understands the game Marlowe is playing, and, as she says, "You begin to interest me." This sexy banter steals the scene for Malone.

Warner gave her bigger parts in Janie Gets Married (1945), Night and Day (1946), and To the Victor (1946), with Dennis Morgan. Her first lead was Two Guys from Texas (1948) with Morgan and Jack Carson; this film, in her words, established her onscreen persona as "the all-American girl watching the all-American boy do all sorts of things."

She appeared in One Sunday Afternoon (1948) with Dennis Morgan and Janis Paige for director Raoul Walsh; this was a remake of The Strawberry Blonde (1941), with Malone playing the part played by Olivia de Havilland in the original. She was billed third in Flaxy Martin (1949) with Virginia Mayo and Zachary Scott, then played a good girl in a Western with Joel McCrea, South of St Louis (1949). McCrea and Mayo were re-teamed with Malone in support in Colorado Territory (1949), a remake of High Sierra (1941), also for Walsh, her last film before she left the studio. Filmink argued Warners gave "juicier roles during this period to its other contract stars like Viveca Lindfords, Virginia Mayo and Alexis Smith."

=== Freelancer ===
Columbia used Malone to play Randolph Scott's leading lady in The Man from Nevada (1950). She stayed at that studio for Convicted (1950) and The Killer That Stalked New York (1950). She made Mrs. O'Malley and Mr. Malone (1951) at MGM and played Tim Holt's love interest in RKO's Saddle Legion (1951) and John Ireland's love interest in The Bushwackers (1951). She began acting on television while continuing to appear in films, guest-starring on shows such as The Philco-Goodyear Television Playhouse ("Education of a Fullback", 1951), and Kraft Theatre ("The Golden Slate", 1951).

She relocated to New York City for several months to study acting until producer Hal B. Wallis called her back to appear in Scared Stiff (1953) starring the comedy duo of Dean Martin and Jerry Lewis. Malone appeared in a war film, Torpedo Alley (1952) for Allied Artists. She was a love interest in Westerns with Ronald Reagan (Law and Order, 1953) and Mark Stevens (Jack Slade, 1953). She was also in the thriller Loophole (1954), billed second. She did episodes of The Doctor ("The Runaways", 1953), Omnibus ("The Horn Blows at Midnight", 1953); Four Star Playhouse ("Moorings", 1953; "A Study in Panic", 1954), Fireside Theatre ("Afraid to Live", 1954; "Our Son", 1954; "Mr Onion" 1955), Lux Video Theatre ("The Hunted", 1955), The Christophers ("The World Starts with Jimmy", 1955), and General Electric Theatre ("The Clown" with Henry Fonda, 1955).

Film roles included The Lone Gun (1954), a Western with George Montgomery; Pushover (1954), a thriller with Fred MacMurray and Kim Novak; and Private Hell 36 (1954) from director Don Siegel. Malone was reunited with Sinatra in Young at Heart (1954), as a co-star. Filmink noted during this period Malone mostly played second female leads, or "the girl" in Westerns.

She again co-starred with Ireland in The Fast and the Furious (1955), directed by Ireland but perhaps best remembered for being the first film produced by Roger Corman, who would later recount that Malone "had left her agent and, having no work, accepted a part for next to nothing." He cast her as the female lead in his directorial debut, Five Guns West (1955). At Warner Bros., Malone made a Western with Randolph Scott, Tall Man Riding (1955), then was cast as Liberace's love interest in the unsuccessful film Sincerely Yours (1955). More successful was the Paramount musical comedy Artists and Models (1955), a reunion with Martin and Lewis, where she played the love interest of Martin's character. She then returned to Westerns: At Gunpoint (1955), with MacMurray; Tension at Table Rock (1956), with Richard Egan; and Pillars of the Sky (1956) with Jeff Chandler.

Malone's career received a boost when she had a leading part in Battle Cry (1955), playing a married woman who has an affair with a young soldier (Tab Hunter) during World War II, a box-office hit. Filmknk argued "the penny dropped in Hollywood how Malone could be used other than as a Girl in Westerns – namely, as a sexually active temptress who was still sympathetic, a sort of minor league Lana Turner."

=== Written on the Wind and stardom ===
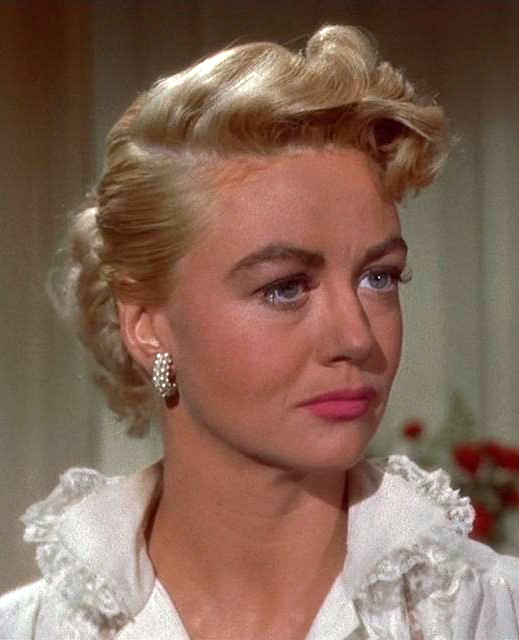
Dorothy Malone in Written on the Wind, 1956

Malone transformed herself into a blonde and shed her "good girl" image when she co-starred with Rock Hudson, Lauren Bacall, and Robert Stack in director Douglas Sirk's drama Written on the Wind (1956). Her portrayal of the dipso-nymphomaniac daughter of a Texas oil baron won her the Academy Award for Best Supporting Actress.

As a result, she was offered more substantial roles in such films as Man of a Thousand Faces (1957), a biopic of Lon Chaney with James Cagney and Tip on a Dead Jockey (1957) with Robert Taylor. Quantez (1957) was another "girl in a Western" part, supporting Fred MacMurray, but The Tarnished Angels (1957) reunited her successfully with Hudson, Sirk, Stack, and producer Albert Zugsmith. Malone was given the important role of Diana Barrymore in the biopic Too Much, Too Soon (1958), but the film was not a success. Malone appeared in Warlock (1959), but went back to guest starring on such television programs as Cimarron City ("A Respectable Girl", 1958) and Alcoa Theatre ("The Last Flight Out", 1960). Malone made a third film with Stack, The Last Voyage (1960), and a third with Hudson, The Last Sunset (1961).

However, she was working more and more in television: Route 66 ("Fly Away Home", 1961), Checkmate ("The Heat of Passion", 1961), Death Valley Days ("The Watch", 1961), The Dick Powell Theatre ("Open Season", 1961), Dr Kildare ("The Administrator", 1962), General Electric Theatre ("Little White Lye", 1961, "Somebody Please Help Me", 1962), The Untouchables with Stack ("The Floyd Gibbons Story", 1962), and The Greatest Show on Earth ("Where the Wire Ends", 1963). Malone was in the first Beach Party (1963) movie, doing most of her scenes with Robert Cummings. She made an uncredited cameo appearance in Fate Is the Hunter (1964). Filmink argued "Malone never reached the top rank not so much due to lack of talent or popularity, but absence of self-belief."

=== Peyton Place ===
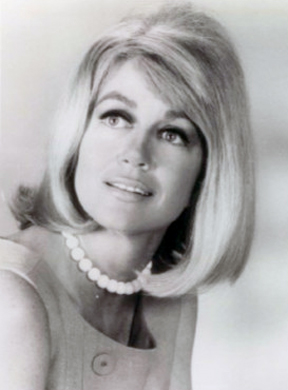
Dorothy Malone in Peyton Place

From 1964–1968, she played the lead role of Constance MacKenzie on the ABC primetime serial Peyton Place except for a brief stretch where she was absent due to surgery. Lola Albright filled in until her return. Malone agreed for $3,000 a week less than ABC's offer of $10,000 weekly, if she could be home nightly for 6 pm dinner with her two daughters and no shooting on weekends. "I never turned down a mother role," Malone explained. "I like playing mothers. I started out as a very young girl in Hollywood doing westerns portraying a mother with a couple of kids."

In 1968, she was written out of the show after complaining that she was given little to do. Malone sued 20th Century Fox for $1.6 million for breach of contract; it was settled out of court. She later returned to the role in the TV movies Murder in Peyton Place (1977) and Peyton Place: The Next Generation (1985).

=== Later career ===
After leaving Peyton Place, Malone went to Italy to make a thriller The Insatiables (1969). In Hollywood, she made a TV movie with Sammy Davis Jr., The Pigeon (1969), then returned to guest-starring on TV series such as The Bold Ones: The New Doctors ("Is This Operation Necessary?", 1972), Ironside ("Confessions: From a Lady of the Night", 1973), and Ellery Queen ("The Adventure of the Eccentric Engineer" 1975).

Malone had a supporting part in Abduction (1975). She featured in the miniseries Rich Man, Poor Man (1976) and guest-starred on Police Woman ("The Trick Book", 1976) and The Streets of San Francisco ("Child of Anger", 1977). She was in the TV movie Murder in Peyton Place (1977) and had a supporting role in Golden Rendezvous (1977).

She was seen on television in The Hardy Boys/Nancy Drew Mysteries ("The House on Possessed Hill" 1978), Flying High ("A Hairy Yak Plays Musical Chairs Eagerly" 1978), Vega$ ("Love, Laugh and Die" 1978), and the TV movie Katie: Portrait of a Centerfold (1978).

Malone was in the Canadian soap opera High Hopes (1978) and had supporting parts in Good Luck, Miss Wyckoff (1979), Winter Kills (1979), and The Day Time Ended (1980), and the miniseries Condominium (1980).

In 1981, Malone made her stage debut in Butterflies Are Free in Winnipeg. She was suffering financial troubles at the time due to two expensive divorces and a life-threatening pulmonary embolism.

The producers of Dallas approached her to step into the role of Miss Ellie Ewing when Barbara Bel Geddes vacated the part in 1984 due to illness, but Malone declined. Her later appearances included The Littlest Hobo ("Guardian Angel" 1982), Matt Houston ("Shark Bait" 1983), The Being (1983), Peyton Place: The Next Generation (1985), and Rest in Pieces (1987).

In her last screen appearance, she played a mother convicted of murdering her family in Basic Instinct (1992).

== Personal life ==
Malone married actor Jacques Bergerac on June 28, 1959, at a Catholic church in Hong Kong, where she was on location for her 1960 film The Last Voyage. They had two daughters, Mimi (born 1960) and Diane (born 1962), and divorced on December 8, 1964.

Malone then married New York businessman and broker Robert Tomarkin on April 3, 1969, at the Silver Bells Wedding Chapel in Las Vegas, Nevada. Her second marriage was later annulled after Malone claimed that Tomarkin married her because of her money.

Malone married Dallas motel chain executive Charles Huston Bell on October 2, 1971, and they divorced after three years.

Around 1971, Malone moved her daughters from Southern California to suburban Dallas, Texas, where she had been raised.

== Death ==
Malone died of natural causes on January 19, 2018, at a nursing facility in Dallas. She is entombed at Calvary Hill Cemetery and Mausoleum in Dallas.

== Recognition ==
Malone has a star on the Hollywood Walk of Fame at 1718 Vine in the Motion Pictures section. It was dedicated February 8, 1960. Malone was one of the industry deaths regarded as missing from the "In Memoriam" segment at the 90th Academy Awards, an omission made more prominent by the fact that she had won an Oscar for Best Supporting Actress at the 29th Academy Awards.

Filmink argued "Whenever she was teamed with a really first-rate director – Howard Hawks, Douglas Sirk, Raoul Walsh, Frank Tashlin – she always rose to the occasion. But most of her directors were journeymen... A little bit more gumption and better luck in her collaborators, and who knows what Dorothy Malone might have achieved? Still, it was an incredible career."

== Filmography ==
| Year | Title | Role | Notes |
|---|---|---|---|
| 1943 | Gildersleeve on Broadway | Model | Uncredited |
| 1943 | The Falcon and the Co-eds | Dorothy Co-ed | as Dorothy Maloney |
| 1943 | Higher and Higher | Bridesmaid | Uncredited |
| 1944 | Seven Days Ashore | Betty – Pianist | Uncredited |
| 1944 | Show Business | Chorine | Uncredited |
| 1944 | Step Lively | Telephone operator | Uncredited |
| 1944 | Youth Runs Wild | Girl in Booth | Uncredited |
| 1944 | One Mysterious Night | Eileen Daley | Uncredited |
| 1944 | Hollywood Canteen | Junior Hostess | Uncredited |
| 1945 | Too Young to Know | Mary | |
| 1946 | Janie Gets Married | Sgt. Spud Lee | |
| 1946 | Night and Day | Nancy | |
| 1946 | The Big Sleep | Acme Book Shop Proprietress | |
| 1948 | To the Victor | Miriam | |
| 1948 | Two Guys from Texas | Joan Winston | |
| 1948 | One Sunday Afternoon | Amy Lind | |
| 1949 | Flaxy Martin | Nora Carson | |
| 1949 | South of St. Louis | Deborah Miller | |
| 1949 | Colorado Territory | Julie Ann Winslow | |
| 1950 | The Nevadan | Karen Galt | |
| 1950 | Convicted | Kay Knowland | |
| 1950 | The Killer That Stalked New York | Alice Lorie | |
| 1950 | Mrs. O'Malley and Mr. Malone | Lola Gillway | |
| 1951 | Saddle Legion | Dr. Ann F. Rollins | |
| 1951 | The Bushwackers | Cathy Sharpe | |
| 1952 | Torpedo Alley | Lt. Susan Peabody | |
| 1953 | Scared Stiff | Rosie | |
| 1953 | Law & Order | Jeannie | |
| 1953 | Jack Slade | Virginia Maria Dale | |
| 1953 | Omnibus | Elizabeth | Episode: "The Horn Blows at Midnight" |
| 1953 | Four Star Playhouse | Marie Roberts | Episode: "Moorings" |
| 1954 | Young at Heart | Fran Tuttle | |
| 1954 | Loophole | Ruthie Donovan | |
| 1954 | The Lone Gun | Charlotte Downing | |
| 1954 | Pushover | Ann Stewart | |
| 1954 | Private Hell 36 | Francey Farnham | |
| 1954 | Security Risk | Donna Weeks | |
| 1954 | Four Star Playhouse | Ella | Episode: "A Study in Panic" |
| 1955 | Battle Cry | Elaine Yarborough | |
| 1955 | The Fast and the Furious | Connie Adair | |
| 1955 | Five Guns West | Shalee | |
| 1955 | Tall Man Riding | Corinna Ordway | |
| 1955 | Sincerely Yours | Linda Curtis | |
| 1955 | Artists and Models | Abigail 'Abby' Parker | |
| 1955 | At Gunpoint | Martha Wright | |
| 1955 | Fireside Theater | Marion Carney | Episode: "Mr. Onion" |
| 1955 | Lux Video Theatre | Intermission Guest | Episode: "The Hunted" |
| 1955 | G.E. True Theater | Eva Balto Kelly | Episode: "The Clown" |
| 1956 | Tension at Table Rock | Lorna Miller | |
| 1956 | Pillars of the Sky | Calla Gaxton | |
| 1956 | Written on the Wind | Marylee Hadley | Academy Award for Best Supporting Actress; Nominated—Golden Globe Award for Best Supporting Actress – Motion Picture |
| 1956 | The Loretta Young Show | May Hadley | Episode: "A Ticket for May" |
| 1957 | Quantez | Chaney | |
| 1957 | Man of a Thousand Faces | Cleva Creighton Chaney | |
| 1957 | Tip on a Dead Jockey | Phyllis Tredman | |
| 1957 | The Tarnished Angels | LaVerne Shumann | |
| 1958 | Too Much, Too Soon | Diana Barrymore | |
| 1958 | Cimarron City | Nora Arkins | Episode: "A Respectable Girl" |
| 1959 | Warlock | Lily Dollar | |
| 1960 | The Last Voyage | Laurie Henderson | |
| 1960 | Alcoa Theatre | Ann St. Martin | Episode: "The Last Flight Out" |
| 1961 | The Last Sunset | Belle Breckenridge | |
| 1961 | Route 66 | Christina Summers | Episode: "Fly Away Home" |
| 1961 | Checkmate | Lorna Shay | Episode: "The Heat of Passion" |
| 1961 | The Dick Powell Show | Elena Shay | Episode: "Open Season" |
| 1961 | G.E. True Theater | Ellen Rogers | Episode: "Little White Lye" |
| 1962 | Dr. Kildare | Rena Ladovan | Episode: "The Administrator" |
| 1962 | The Untouchables | Kitty Edmonds | Episode: "The Floyd Gibbons Story" |
| 1962 | G.E. True Theater | Ruth Hammond | Episode: "Somebody Please Help Me!" |
| 1963 | Beach Party | Marianne | |
| 1964 | The Greatest Show on Earth | Jeannie Gilbert | Episode: "Where the Wire Ends" |
| 1964 | Fate Is the Hunter | Lisa Bond | Uncredited |
| 1964 | Arrest and Trial | Lois Janeway | Episode: "Modus Operandi" |
| 1964–1968 | Peyton Place | Constance MacKenzie Carson | 342 episodes Golden Apple Award for Most Cooperative Actress (1965); Photoplay Award for Most Popular Female Star (1965); Nominated—Golden Globe Award for Best TV Star – Female (1965–1966) |
| 1967 | Insight | Edith Stein | Episode: "The Edith Stein Story" |
| 1969 | Carnal Circuit | Vanessa Brighton | |
| 1969 | The Pigeon | Elaine Hagen | Television film |
| 1972 | The Bold Ones: The New Doctors | Ruth McLayne | Episode: "Is This Operation Necessary?" |
| 1973 | Ironside | Agatha Mott | Episode: "Confessions: From a Lady of the Night" |
| 1975 | The Man Who Would Not Die | Paula Stafford | |
| 1975 | Abduction | Mrs. Prescott | |
| 1976 | Ellery Queen | Carol Franklin | Episode: "The Adventure of the Electric Engineer" |
| 1976 | Rich Man, Poor Man | Irene Goodwin | Episode: "Part VII: Chapters 10"; Episode: "Part VIII: Chapters 11 and 12" |
| 1976 | The Streets of San Francisco | Julia Desmond | Episode: "Child of Anger" |
| 1977 | Golden Rendezvous | Mrs. Skinner | |
| 1977 | Little Ladies of the Night | Maggie | Television film |
| 1977 | The November Plan | Dawn Archer | Television film |
| 1977 | Murder in Peyton Place | Constance MacKenzie | Television film |
| 1978 | The Hardy Boys/Nancy Drew Mysteries | Mrs. Blain | Episode: "The House on Possessed Hill" |
| 1978 | High Hopes | Mrs. Herzog | |
| 1978 | Vega$ | Mrs. Gardner | Episode: "Love, Laugh, and Die" |
| 1978 | Flying High | Jane | Episode: "A Hairy Yak Plays Musical Chairs Eagerly" |
| 1978 | Katie: Portrait of a Centrefold | Myrtle Cutler | Television film |
| 1979 | The Day Time Ended | Ana Williams | |
| 1979 | Good Luck, Miss Wyckoff | Mildred | |
| 1979 | Winter Kills | Emma Kegan | |
| 1979 | The Greatest Heroes of the Bible | Nagar | Episode: "Sodom and Gomorrah" |
| 1980 | The Littlest Hobo | Elena | Episode: "Guardian Angle" |
| 1980 | Condominium | Molly Denniver | Television film |
| 1982 | Off Your Rocker | Shelley Delaine | |
| 1983 | The Being | Marge Smith | |
| 1984 | He's Not Your Son | Dr. Sullivan | Television film |
| 1985 | Peyton Place: The Next Generation | Constance Carson | |
| 1987 | Rest in Pieces | Catherine Boyle | |
| 1992 | Basic Instinct | Hazel Dobkins | |
