= Last Voyage =

- "Last Voyage" Live at Innercity: Amsterdam RAI Tiësto
- The Last Voyage (Doctor Who) audio Doctor Who story
- The Last Voyage 1960 American disaster film
