= April, April! =

1935 film

- Directed by: Detlef Sierck
- Written by: H.W. Litschke; Rudo Ritter
- Produced by: Peter Paul Brauer
- Starring: Albrecht Schoenhals; Carola Höhn; Erhard Siedel
- Cinematography: Willi Winterstein
- Edited by: Fritz Stapenhorst
- Music by: Werner Bochmann
- Production company: UFA
- Distributed by: UFA
- Release date: 24 October 1935
- Running time: 82 minutes
- Country: Germany
- Language: German

April, April! is a 1935 German comedy film. It is the first feature film directed by Detlef Sierck, who would go on to fame in America under his anglicized name of Douglas Sirk. The film stars Albrecht Schoenhals, Carola Höhn and Erhard Siedel.

The film's title is a German expression used to reveal to someone that they are the butt of an April Fools' Day prank, and translates as "April Fool!".

A Dutch-language version of the film titled 't Was één April was also filmed, with Sierck directing the footage shot in Germany and Jacques van Tol directing the footage shot in Holland. The Dutch version is believed to be lost, no known copies exist.

== Plot ==
Julius Lampe is a social-climbing former baker who started a successful pasta factory that made him wealthy. A party held at his home is interrupted when he receives a letter from the Prince von Holsten-Böhlau, who would like to place a large order for Lampe's noodles to take on an expedition to Africa. Lampe's friend Finke is tired of how pretentious the nouveau riche Lampe is, and decides to teach him a lesson on April Fools' Day. Finke leaves the party and pretends to be the Prince's assistant, calling Lampe on the phone with the news that the Prince plans to personally visit and inspect the pasta factory the next day. Lampe excitedly makes elaborate preparations for the Prince's visit.

Lampe eventually learns from his daughter Mirna's love interest, Reinhold Leisegang, that the impending visit was a prank, but he has already told the whole city that the Prince is coming to his factory and Lampe is afraid of embarrassment if he admits that he was wrong. Leisegang attempts to mitigate the damage caused by the prank and arranges for a friend of his, Müller, to play the role of the Prince for a carefully staged fake visit to the factory.

Meanwhile, unknown to Lampe, the actual Prince sees the news article about his visit and assumes it was arranged for him and he must go. Lampe mistakes the actual Prince for the imposter and treats him terribly, while he treats the over-the-top imposter like a Prince. The real Prince falls in love with Lampe's secretary, Friedel, while Lampe tries to convince the imposter to woo his daughter Mirna.

== Cast ==
- Albrecht Schoenhals as Prinz von Holsten-Böhlau
- Carola Höhn as Friedel Bild
- Erhard Siedel as Julius Lampe
- Lina Carstens as Mathilde Lampe
- Charlott Daudert as Mirna Lampe
- Hubert von Meyerinck as Müller, the traveler
- Werner Finck as Reinhold Leisegang
- Paul Westermeier as Finke
- Annemarie Korff as The Prince's Secretary
- Hilde Schneider as Emmi - Lampes Zofe
