= The Pigeon (1969 film) =

- Written by: Edward J. Lakso; Stanley Roberts
- Directed by: Earl Bellamy
- Starring: Sammy Davis Jr. Dorothy Malone; Victoria Vetri; Ricardo Montalbán; Pat Boone
- Music by: Billy May
- Country of origin: United States
- Original language: English

Production
- Executive producers: Aaron Spelling; Danny Thomas
- Producer: Alex Gottlieb
- Cinematography: Henry Cronjager Jr.
- Editor: Ben Ray
- Running time: 74 minutes
- Production company: Spelling/Thomas Productions

Original release
- Network: ABC
- Release: November 4, 1969

The Pigeon is a 1969 American made-for-television crime drama film starring Sammy Davis Jr. It was directed by Earl Bellamy. It was originally aired as the ABC Movie of the Week on November 4, 1969.

== Plot ==
A private eye is hired to protect a young girl.

== Cast ==
- Sammy Davis Jr. as Larry Miller
- Dorothy Malone as Elaine Hagen
- Victoria Vetri as Barbara Hagen
- Ricardo Montalbán as John Stambler / Kane
- Pat Boone as Dave Williams
- Roy Glenn as Lieutenant Frank Miller
- Patsy Kelly as Mrs. Macready, the Landlady
- Norman Alden as Carl, the First Thug
- Bennie Dobbins as Eddie, the Second Thug (as Bernie Dobbins)
- Bill Quinn as Doctor
- Judith Jordan as Sarah
- Francis De Sales as Caine

== Production ==
Davis developed the concept with Aaron Spelling and hoped it would lead to a TV series.

Boone says he was surprised to be offered a role in the film.

Davis was unsatisfied with the movie saying "let's say I hit a triple when I was going for a homer... We played him [my character] a little too straight." However no series resulted.
