= The Nevadan =

1950 film by Gordon Douglas

- Theatrical release poster
- Directed by: Gordon Douglas
- Written by: George W. George; George F. Slavin
- Produced by: Harry Joe Brown
- Starring: Randolph Scott; Dorothy Malone; Forrest Tucker; Frank Faylen; George Macready
- Cinematography: Charles Lawton Jr.
- Edited by: Richard Fantl
- Music by: Arthur Morton
- Color process: Cinecolor
- Production company: Columbia Pictures
- Distributed by: Columbia Pictures
- Release date: January 11, 1950 (USA)
- Running time: 81 minutes
- Country: United States
- Language: English

The Nevadan is a 1950 American Cinecolor Western film directed by Gordon Douglas and starring Randolph Scott, Dorothy Malone, Forrest Tucker, Frank Faylen and George Macready. Written by George W. George and George F. Slavin, the film's plot concerns a mysterious stranger who crosses paths with an outlaw bank robber and a greedy rancher.

== Plot ==
U.S. Marshal Andrew Barclay arranges the escape of outlaw Tom Tanner in order to locate $250,000 in gold stolen by Tanner in a stagecoach robbery. Tanner ambushes Barclay and forces him to trade clothes and accompany him to a bank, where Tanner retrieves a map showing the location of the gold.

On the road, Tanner and Barclay are stopped by brothers Jeff and Bart, who demand the map at gunpoint. To Tanner's surprise, Barclay disarms the brothers and takes their horses. Barclay later explains that he is a fugitive just like Tanner and proposes that they work together as a team. That night, while Barclay is asleep, Tanner rides away without him.

The next day, Barclay stops at a ranch owned by beautiful Karen Galt and trades his lame horse for a fresh one. He continues to the town of Twin Forks, which is run by Karen's father, Edward Galt. At the saloon, Barclay sees Tanner, who pretends not to know him. Galt questions Barclay about Tanner's stolen gold, which was never discovered following the robbery. When Barclay denies knowing Tanner, Galt orders his henchmen to beat him.

Later that night, Tanner kills an intruder in his room. To force Tanner to reveal the location of the gold, Galt stages the scene to appear as if a murder has been committed rather than an act of self-defense. After being taken to jail, Tanner escapes with the help of Barclay after agreeing to share the gold. The men ride to the old Galt ranch, now used as a pasture for sick horses. When Karen discovers them hiding there, Barclay reveals that he is in fact a U.S. Marshal.

Galt recognizes the escape horses used by Tanner and Barclay as belonging to his ranch. He later questions his daughter about them, and she reveals Barclay's secret, unaware that her father is after the gold himself. When Karen overhears Galt plotting with his henchmen, she realizes that Barclay's life is in danger and rides to the hideout to warn him. One of Galt's men follows her and summons the others to the old Galt ranch. When they arrive, Karen meets them with gunfire, allowing Barclay and Tanner a head start on their escape.

Galt finds his daughter and has her placed in custody while he and the others track Barclay and Tanner to the old mine shaft where Tanner has hidden the gold. During the ensuing gunfight, Galt and his men are killed. Barclay reveals that Tanner was allowed to escape so that the gold could be retrieved. When the mine shaft collapses, Barclay overcomes Tanner and takes his prisoner back to jail. Karen knows that he will return to her because he has left his horse in her care.

== Cast ==
- Randolph Scott as Andrew Barclay
- Dorothy Malone as Karen Galt
- Forrest Tucker as Tom Tanner
- Frank Faylen as Jeff
- George Macready as Edward Galt
- Charles Kemper as Sheriff Dyke Merrick
- Jeff Corey as Bart
- Tom Powers as Bill Martin
- Jock Mahoney as Sandy
- Olin Howland as Rusty (uncredited)
