= Tip on a Dead Jockey =

1957 film by Richard Thorpe

- Theatrical film poster
- Directed by: Richard Thorpe
- Written by: Charles Lederer
- Based on: "Tip on a Dead Jockey" by Irwin Shaw
- Produced by: Edwin H. Knopf
- Starring: Robert Taylor; Dorothy Malone
- Cinematography: George J. Folsey
- Edited by: Ben Lewis
- Music by: Miklós Rózsa
- Production company: Metro-Goldwyn-Mayer
- Release date: September 6, 1957
- Running time: 98 minutes
- Country: United States
- Language: English
- Budget: $1,464,000
- Box office: $1,050,000

Tip on a Dead Jockey is a 1957 American drama film directed by Richard Thorpe and starring Robert Taylor and Dorothy Malone. It is based on The New Yorker 1954 short story by Irwin Shaw.

== Plot ==
Phyllis Tredman is shocked when her husband Lloyd, a decorated Korean War U.S. Air Force pilot, sends word to her after his discharge from military service requesting a divorce.

She tracks him down in Madrid, Spain, where it turns out Lloyd is drinking and gambling heavily. He is tormented by having ordered so many Air Force pilots to their deaths on dangerous missions. He also is strangely attracted to Paquita, the wife of his friend and fellow pilot Jimmy Heldon.

A mysterious man named Bert Smith, aware that Lloyd is down on his luck, offers him $25,000 to do something illegal and dangerous—smuggling currency from Cairo to Madrid, dropping the box of cash in mid-air. Lloyd has wagered his last $1,000 on a horse race. He says if the horse wins, he won't need Smith's offer, but the race ends tragically with the jockey killed. Lloyd suspects foul play.

Jimmy takes the job after Lloyd refuses. He ends up missing and Paquita blames Lloyd, calling him a coward. It turns out to be a test run from which Jimmy returns late but safely. He intends to go through with the crime, risking everything, but Lloyd knocks him out and pilots the plane himself.

Steadying himself after first being paralyzed with fear, Lloyd's flight goes badly when a propeller is damaged. Authorities are put on alert and Interpol agents begin tracking the plane. Lloyd tries to hide the money, only to discover narcotics are being smuggled by Bert as well.

He drops the box from the sky as planned, but notifies Interpol and gets Bert arrested at the scene of the crime. The thankful authorities elect not to punish Lloyd, who returns to Phyllis' open arms.

== Cast ==
- Robert Taylor as Lloyd Tredman
- Dorothy Malone as Phyllis Tredman
- Marcel Dalio as Toto del Aro
- Martin Gabel as Bert Smith
- Gia Scala as Paquita Heldon
- Jack Lord as Jimmy Heldon
- Hayden Rorke as J.R. Nichols
- Joyce Jameson as Sue Fan Finley

== Production ==
At one stage, Orson Welles was going to direct the film.

It is also the first MGM film to open with the current roaring lion in the studio's logo.

== Reception ==
According to MGM records the film earned $400,000 in the US and Canada and $650,000 elsewhere resulting in a whopping loss of $886,000.

== See also ==
- List of American films of 1957
