= Boefje =

1939 film by Douglas Sirk

- Directed by: Detlef Sierck
- Screenplay by: Carl Zuckmayer, Curt Alexander, Jaap van der Poll
- Based on: Boefje by Marie Joseph Brusse
- Produced by: Leo Meyer
- Cinematography: Akos Farkas
- Edited by: Rita Roland
- Music by: Cor Steyn
- Distributed by: City Film
- Release date: October 4, 1939
- Running time: 94 minutes
- Country: Netherlands
- Language: Dutch

Boefje ([ˈbufjə], "rascal") is a 1939 Dutch children's comedic melodrama directed by Detlef Sierck. The film is based on a classic 1903 Dutch children's book of the same name, written by journalist Marie Joseph Brusse.

== Plot summary ==
Jan Grovers and his friend Pietje Puk are mischievous boys on the Rotterdam waterfront. Jan, nicknamed “rascal,” (Boefje), forever gets in trouble with his harried mother, who maintains their squalid apartment and cares for his three sisters, while his father works long days and routinely beats Jan. Jan and Pietje roam the city, committing petty thefts, and dreaming of being wealthy gangsters in America, based on adventure stories they read.

One day, a neighborhood Pastor sees Jan steal herring from a fishmonger. The Pastor tries to catch Jan, but Jan escapes. Soon after, the Pastor sees cruel children throw a cat into the river and watches Jan dive in to save the cat. The Pastor believes Jan has a good heart and goes to Jan’s mother, asking if he can help the boy.

Meanwhile, Jan and Pietje steal a bicycle pump from a junk shop. The Pastor sees this and protects Jan from the police, but makes Jan return the pump and promise never to lie to him again.

The Pastor invites Jan to his parsonage, where the housekeeper is suspicious of both Jan and the new maid, a young woman just released from prison. The housekeeper argues that people cannot change their inherent nature, while the Pastor believes they can, if they are in a loving, supportive environment.

A short time later, Jan gets into an argument with Pietje’s mother and spitefully throws hot coals into her apartment, nearly burning it down. She argues that Jan should be prosecuted, but the Pastor succeeds in getting Jan sent to a reform school at a monastery instead. Jan dreads the place, his head filled with nightmarish images, but once he arrives, the priests are kind and patient and his fellow students are decent to him. Still, Jan is resentful, and constantly acts up. The only connection he forms is with a priest who maintains the ancient pipe organ.

Jan escapes and runs back to Rotterdam. He and Pietje plot their escape to America. They plan to steal a nearby boat, but they also need money and a map. Jan remembers the Pastor’s map of the world in his parsonage, so the boys break in while everyone is away. However, in addition to the map, Pietje steals the housekeeper’s money and jewelry, then hides a piece of the jewelry in the maid’s apron, to frame her. Jan is uncomfortable with this but doesn’t stop it.

Flush with cash, Jan buys gifts for his family and returns to them with lies about how he was given the money by the reform school and sent into the city. He tells them he’s training to be a pipe organ repairman. Unfortunately, just then, Jan’s grandfather forgets where he hid his cash and assumes it has been stolen. He blames Jan, who cannot explain where he got his own money, and Jan is arrested.

Jan spends the night in jail and is terrified by the ordeal, praying and promising God he will never steal again. Meanwhile, Jan’s grandfather finds his misplaced money and drops the charges. The Pastor takes Jan back to the parsonage, where the theft there has just been discovered. Jan is overwhelmed with guilt. He cannot let the innocent maid go to jail, so he confesses to the Pastor.

Jan and Pietje are put on trial. The Pastor speaks in Jan’s defense. A psychologist testifies on Jan’s behalf, using two lab rats, brought up under extremely different conditions, to illustrate that Jan’s crimes are due to his upbringing in abject poverty, with parents who never showed him any love. The court is convinced, and orders Jan sent not to prison, like Pietje, but back to the reform school.

When the Pastor delivers Jan there, Jan reveals what he promises is his final theft – he stole the two lab rats, because the psychologist intended to dissect them after the trial. Jan asks the Pastor to protect the rats, then finds himself drawn by the beautiful music of the pipe organ back to the priest he met before.

== Cast ==
- Annie van Ees as Boefje (Jan Grovers)
- Albert van Dalsum as Pastor
- Enny Snijders as Mrs. Grovers (as Enny Heymans-Snijders)
- Piet Bron as Mr. Grovers
- Guus Brox as Pietje Puk
- Mien Duymaer Van Twist as Floddermadam (as Mien Duymaer van Twist)
- Piet Köhler as Grandfather
- Nel Oosthout
- Henri de Vries (as Henry de Vries)
- Frits van Dijk
- Herman Bouber
- Matthieu van Eysden
- Anton Roemer
- Jan C. de Vos
- Ludzer Eringa
- Charles Braakensiek

== Production ==
German director Detlef Sierck fled the Nazis in 1937. He went first to Italy, then France, and shot this film in Holland just before leaving for America with his wife in 1939. Sierck left before editing was completed, without seeing the finished film, and went to work in Hollywood under the anglicized name of Douglas Sirk.

The lead role of Jan Grovers, a 12-year-old boy, is played by a 46-year-old woman, Annie van Ees, who had played the same role on the stage more than 1500 times, beginning in 1923. Boefje would be her only screen performance.

The film was scheduled to screen at the first ever Cannes Film Festival, in competition for the Palme d'Or, but the festival was postponed and then cancelled when Germany invaded Poland on the festival's opening day, September 1, 1939.

== Wilton's Zoo ==
Boefje is often mistakenly referred to as Wilton's Zoo, which is sometimes incorrectly cited as a title Boefje may have been released under in English-speaking markets. Wilton's Zoo was actually an entirely separate film project, prior to Boefje. Detlef Sierck told executives at the UFA Studios that he was traveling for location scouting for Wilton's Zoo as a cover story for his escape from Germany in 1937. Wilton's Zoo was never filmed.
