= Pillars of the Sky =

1956 American film

- Film poster by Reynold Brown
- Directed by: George Marshall
- Screenplay by: Sam Rolfe
- Based on: Heck Allen (as Will Henry)
- Produced by: Robert Arthur
- Starring: Jeff Chandler; Dorothy Malone; Ward Bond
- Cinematography: Harold Lipstein
- Edited by: Milton Carruth
- Music by: William Lava; Heinz Roemheld
- Color process: Technicolor
- Production company: Universal Pictures
- Distributed by: Universal Pictures
- Release date: October 12, 1956 (New York City)
- Running time: 95 minutes
- Country: United States
- Language: English
- Box office: $1.5 million (US)

Pillars of the Sky is a 1956 American CinemaScope Western film directed by George Marshall and starring Jeff Chandler, Dorothy Malone and Ward Bond. It was produced and distributed by Universal Pictures.

== Plot ==
Oregon Country 1868: Indians of many tribes trust Sgt. Emmett Bell, who rides into Dr. Joseph Holden's mission with his Indian scouts. However, troop and weapon movements by new U.S. Cavalry commanding officer Col. Steadlow have endangered the peace and angered the chiefs, in particular one called Kamiakin. An outraged Bell tries to appeal to Steadlow as well as Capt. Tom Gaxton, whose wife Calla was once in love with him. Calla and another woman are taken captive but are rescued by Bell, rekindling his and Calla's romance.

The Indians ambush a large cavalry patrol and, after a fierce fight – with extensive dead and wounded on both sides – the surviving soldiers break through the Indians and manage to escape to Holden's mission, using it as a fortification against an expected attack. Appeals for a truce go in vain. However, a particularly bloodthirsty act by Kamiakin results in his being killed by one of his own, whereupon Bell and the chiefs agree to do whatever is necessary to restore the peace.

== Cast ==
- Jeff Chandler as First Sergeant Emmett Bell
- Dorothy Malone as Calla Gaxton
- Ward Bond as Doctor Joseph Holden
- Keith Andes as Captain Tom Gaxton
- Lee Marvin as Sergeant Lloyd Carracart
- Sydney Chaplin as Timothy
- Willis Bouchey as Colonel Edson Stedlow
- Michael Ansara as Kamiakin
- Olive Carey as Mrs. Anne Avery
- Charles Horvath as Sergeant Dutch Williams
- Orlando Rodriguez as Malachi
- Glen Kramer as Lieutenant Winston
- Floyd Simmons as Lieutenant Hammond
- Pat Hogan as Jacob
- Felix Noriego as Lucas
- Paul Smith as Morgan
- Martin Milner as Waco
- Robert Ellis as Albie
- Ralph Votrian as Music (as Ralph J Votrian)
- Walter Coy as Major Donahue
- Alberto Morin as Sgt. Major Frenchy Desmonde
- Richard Hale as Isaiah
- Frank Kova as Zachariah (as Frank de Kova)
- Terry Wilson as Captain Fanning
- Philip Kieffer as Major Randall
- Gilbert Conner as Elijah

== Production ==
The film was partly shot on location in Oregon over six weeks. At one stage it was announced the film was going to be directed by John Ford and star John Wayne.

Filming started August 1955.

== Evaluation in film guides ==
Leonard Maltin's Movie Guide gives Pillars of the Sky 2½ stars (out of 4) in a one-sentence write-up which states that "Chandler is apt as swaggering army officer...", with Steven H. Scheuer's Movies on TV also arriving at the 2½ stars (out of 4) rating, deciding that "Western fans will buy this tale of a no-account, hard-drinking, woman-chasing Sgt. who finally sees the error of his ways..."

The Motion Picture Guide makes it unanimous (among the three cited sources), with its 2½-star (out of 5) description of the production as "a relatively satisfying cowboys and Indians film starring Chandler as a cavalry scout who is literally a voice in the wilderness..." and, in conclusion, adds, "[G]ood cast. The outdoor location shooting was done in Oregon".

== See also ==
- List of American films of 1956
