= Border Incident =

1949 film by Anthony Mann

- Theatrical release poster
- Directed by: Anthony Mann
- Screenplay by: John C. Higgins
- Story by: John C. Higgins; George Zuckerman
- Produced by: Nicholas Nayfack
- Starring: Ricardo Montalbán; George Murphy; Howard Da Silva; James Mitchell
- Cinematography: John Alton
- Edited by: Conrad A. Nervig
- Music by: André Previn
- Distributed by: Metro-Goldwyn-Mayer
- Release date: October 28, 1949 (United States)
- Running time: 94 minutes
- Country: United States
- Language: English
- Budget: $749,000
- Box office: $908,000

Border Incident is a 1949 American film noir featuring Ricardo Montalbán, George Murphy, and Howard Da Silva. Directed by Anthony Mann, the MGM production was written by John C. Higgins from a story by John C. Higgins and George Zuckerman. The film was shot by cinematographer John Alton, who used shadows and lighting effects to involve the audience despite the fact that the film was shot on a low budget.

== Plot ==
Set along the All-American Canal, Mexican farm workers, known as "braceros," camp near the California–Mexico border to receive their work permits so they can enter legally into the United States, while others cross the border illegally. These illegal migrant workers are usually robbed and beaten by bandits as they cross the desert. To combat this problem, two agents, Pablo Rodriguez, a Mexican PJF, and Jack Bearnes, an American Border Patrol agent, are assigned by their respective countries to investigate the gang of bandits.

In a meeting with their superiors, Pablo volunteers to disguise himself as a bracero, while Jack follows and records their contacts. In Mexico, Pablo meets Zopoliote who connects him with Owen Parkson, an American broker posing as a rancher. Late at night, Pablo persuades Parkson to help cross the border as he claims the police are after him. At first reluctant, Parkson agrees and directs him to a truck transporting farm workers. During the route, Jeff Amboy, a smuggler, learns that Baldy was unable to obtain work permits and is instead told to drive them to Indio, California, where the migrants work at Parkson's ranch.

Meanwhile, Jack reports to his superiors he lost the trail of the braceros. He goes undercover as Jack Bryant, a fugitive wanted for stealing immigration permits. He returns to Mexico, and with a permit, he entices Parkson, Zopilote, and Cuchillo, a Mexican bandit, who want to obtain the permits. Held hostage by Parkson, Jack offers to sell the permits in exchange for money once they cross the border, which Parkson agrees.

In California, Jack provides Parkson the post office box of a contact in Kansas City, Missouri to obtain the permits. Later that night, Pablo and Jack reconnect, but Jack doesn't offer to help to conceal his identity. Instead, he tells Pablo to contact Neley, a chief inspector, in case anything happens to him. The next morning, Parkson evades capture from the police as he retrieves the package from the post office.

Parkson soon calls Hugo Ulrich to drop off braceros that will be transported across the U.S. Later that night, another contact of Parkson's informs him that Jack had sent a telegram to immigration authorities. Because of this, Jack's cover is blown and is taken out into the field to be killed. Pablo intercepts the truck transporting braceros to help save Jack, whom Parkson kills with a tractor. Pablo contacts Neley to report Jack's murder. While Neley sends in reinforcement, Pablo is apprehended by Parkson and his henchmen.

To hide their operation from authorities, Pablo and the braceros are driven to the "canyon of death" near Mexico. When U.S. Border Patrol agents arrive on scene, a gunfight ensues, in which Parkson, his henchmen, and Zopoliote are killed. When peace is restored, Jack is honored posthumously while Pablo is decorated for his service.

== Cast ==
- Ricardo Montalbán as Pablo Rodriguez
- George Murphy as Jack Bearnes
- Howard Da Silva as Owen Parkson
- James Mitchell as Juan Garcia
- Arnold Moss as Zopilote
- Alfonso Bedoya as Cuchillo
- Teresa Celli as Maria Garcia
- Charles McGraw as Jeff Amboy
- José Torvay as Pocoloco
- John Ridgely as Mr. Neley
- Arthur Hunnicutt as Clayton Nordell
- Sig Ruman as Hugo Wolfgang Ulrich
- Jack Lambert as Chuck
- Otto Waldis as Fritz

== Production ==
The film's trailer.

The film was among a number of lower budgeted movies produced at MGM under the regime of Dore Schary.

According to Mann, "Metro said: ‘Make whatever picture you want.' John [Alton] and I had thought of doing Border Incident, because the guys there were also involved with the Federal agents and T Men. Through the research we had made with T Men we found the fantastic story of the Border Incident boys. We made it on location, but it was really not Metro’s cup of tea. When it came out, they were flabbergasted. It wasn’t anything they thought a motion picture should be!"

== Reception ==
According to MGM records the film earned $580,000 in the US and Canada and $328,000 overseas resulting in a loss of $194,000.

=== Critical response ===
Roger Westcombe compared the film to classic Westerns: "Yet far from a typical Western's sense of freedom, Border Incident shares with [director Mann's previous film noir] T-Men that film's inky, submerged visual quality. These are 'wide' but not 'open' spaces, as Alton's beautifully registered grey-toned but grim visuals make the distant horizons as closed as the American border. The constant presence of vulnerable, innocent peasants adds a piquancy to Border Incident, raising the stakes from the destiny of a mere two police agents to that of an entire underclass."
