= Augie Lohman =

- Born: August Lohman; April 10, 1911; Colorado Springs, Colorado, USA
- Died: August 7, 1989 (aged 78)
- Other names: A. J. Lohman, Auggie Lohman
- Occupation: Special effect artist
- Years active: 1946-1979

August "Augie" Lohman (also known as A. J. Lohman) (April 10, 1911 – August 7, 1989) was an American special effects artist who was nominated at the 33rd Academy Awards for Best Special Effects for the film The Last Voyage.

He worked on over 60 films during his career.
