= 't Was één April =

- Directed by: Douglas Sirk and Jacques van Tol
- Written by: H.W. Litschke, Rudo Ritter
- Release date: 27 March 1936
- Running time: 78 minutes
- Country: Netherlands
- Language: Dutch

't Was één April is a 1936 Dutch film directed by Douglas Sirk and Jacques van Tol. It is a lost film.

== Plot ==
When Mister Vlasman gets promoted from baking bread to making macaroni, he and his wife want to enter high society. They could not be happier when a wealthy baron offers to introduce them into the high class. What they don't realise is that this was all an April Fools' prank. Unfortunately for the pranksters, things get out of hand when a real baron visits the Vlasmans.

== Cast ==
- Jacques Van Bylevelt ... Heer Vlasman
- Tilly Perin-Bouwmeester ... Vlasmans vrouw
- Jopie Koopman ... Vlasmans dochter
- Rob Milton ... Vlasmans dochters verloofde
- Herman Tholen... Baron de Hoog van Vriesland
- Johan Kaart ... Handelaar
- Cissy Van Bennekom ... Vlasmans secretaresse
- Pau Dana ... Secretaresse

== Background ==
The movie is a remake of the German film April, April! (1935), also directed by Douglas Sirk. In the German version the baron was a prince. Sirk never came to the Netherlands. All of his scenes were shot in Germany. Scenes in the Netherlands were directed by Jacques van Tol. No known copies of the film exist today.
