= The Tarnished Angels =

1958 film by Douglas Sirk

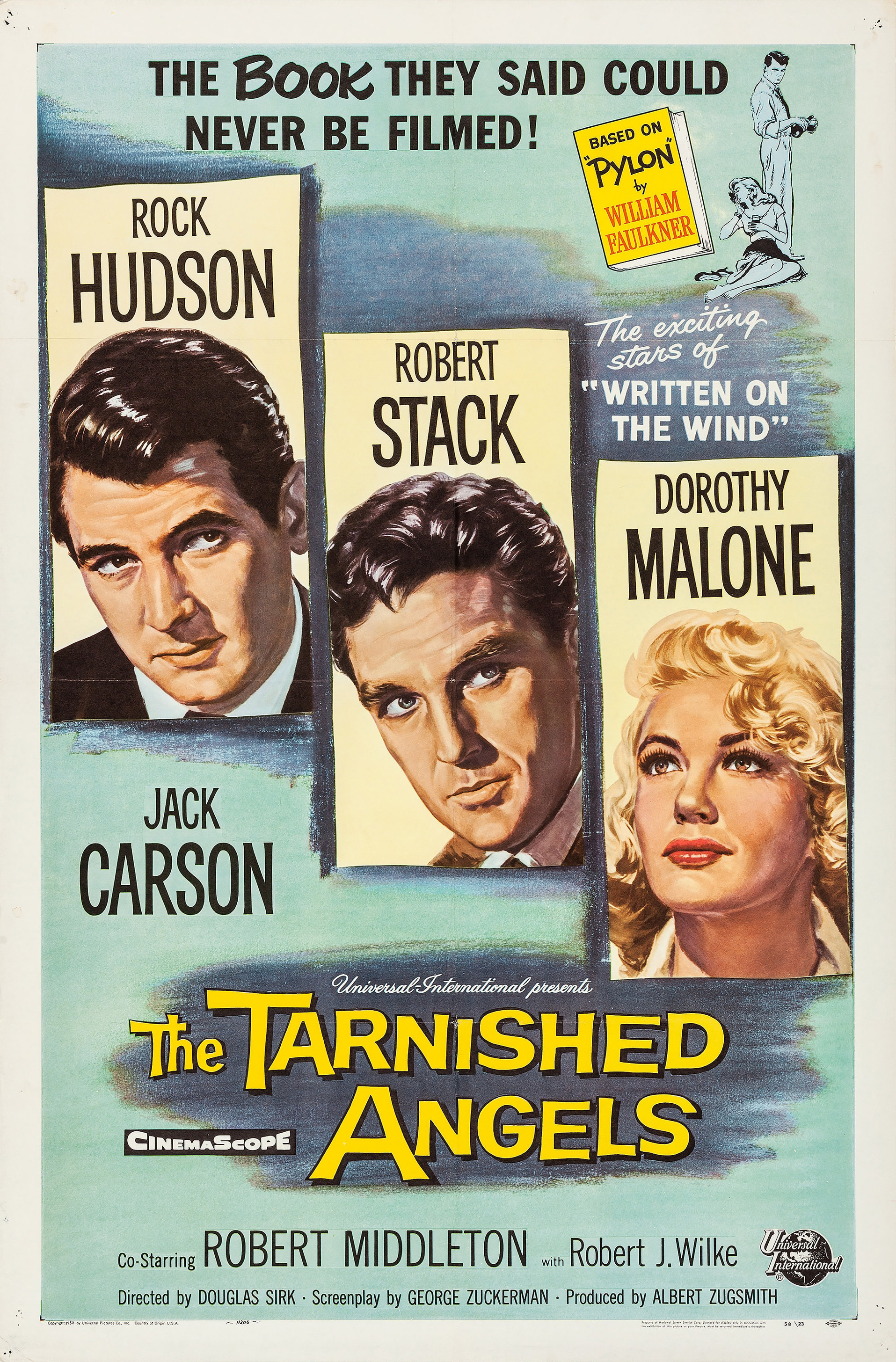
- Theatrical release poster
- Directed by: Douglas Sirk
- Screenplay by: George Zuckerman
- Based on: the novel Pylon by William Faulkner
- Produced by: Albert Zugsmith
- Starring: Rock Hudson; Robert Stack; Dorothy Malone; Jack Carson
- Cinematography: Irving Glassberg
- Edited by: Russell F. Schoengarth
- Music by: Frank Skinner
- Production company: Universal-International
- Distributed by: Universal-International
- Release dates: November 21, 1957 (London); December 25, 1957 (Charlotte, North Carolina)
- Running time: 91 minutes
- Country: United States
- Language: English
- Box office: $1.5 million

The Tarnished Angels is a 1957 black-and-white American CinemaScope drama film directed by Douglas Sirk and starring Rock Hudson, Robert Stack, Dorothy Malone, Jack Carson, and Robert Middleton. The screenplay by George Zuckerman is based on the 1935 novel Pylon by William Faulkner.

== Plot ==
Disillusioned World War I flying ace Roger Shumann (Robert Stack) spends his days during the Great Depression making appearances as a barnstorming pilot at rural airshows with his parachutist wife LaVerne (Dorothy Malone), worshipful son Jack (Chris Olsen), and mechanic Jiggs (Jack Carson) in tow.

New Orleans reporter Burke Devlin (Rock Hudson) is intrigued by the gypsy-like lifestyle of the former war hero, but is dismayed by his cavalier treatment of his family and soon finds himself attracted to the neglected LaVerne. Meanwhile, Roger barters with aging business magnate Matt Ord (Robert Middleton) for a plane in exchange for a few hours with his wife. Tragedy ensues when Jiggs' anger about his employer's refusal to face family responsibilities causes him to make a rash and fatal decision. He manages, with some difficulty, to get Shumann's aircraft to start, but the plane crashes and Shumann is killed. After rejecting and then reconciling with Devlin, LaVerne returns to Iowa with Jack.

== Cast ==
- Rock Hudson as Burke Devlin
- Robert Stack as Roger Shumann
- Dorothy Malone as LaVerne Shumann
- Jack Carson as Jiggs
- Robert Middleton as Matt Ord
- Alan Reed as Colonel Fineman
- Alexander Lockwood as Sam Hagood
- Chris Olsen as Jack Shumann
- Robert J. Wilke as Hank
- Troy Donahue as Frank Burnham
- William Schallert as Ted Baker
- Betty Utey as Dancing Girl
- Phil Harvey as Telegraph Editor
- Steve Drexel as Young Man
- Eugene Borden as Claude Mollet
- Stephen Ellis as Mechanic

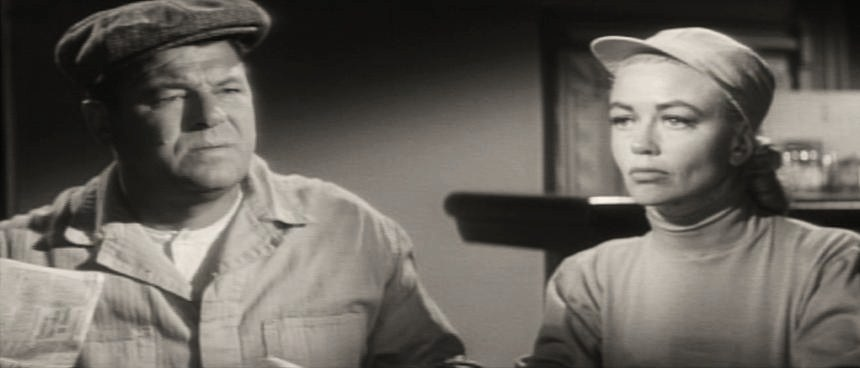
Jack Carson and Dorothy Malone

== Production ==
Sirk had long been an admirer of Faulkner's novel, having written an (unfilmed) script adaptation at UFA in the 1930s. He later said "Pylon impressed me with its characters, and I was always very interested in flying."

Sirk had the chance to make the film at Universal-International following the success of Written on the Wind. The movie used many key contributors to Wind including actors Rock Hudson, Robert Stack and Dorothy Malone, writer George Zuckerman and producer Albert Zugsmith. Sirk said Zuckerman helped persuade Zugsmith to make the movie, with the producer being attracted to the Dorothy Malone part. Sirk later called Zugsmith "the only producer I could persuade to reject the happy end" of the film, i.e. to not finish with the characters of Hudson and Malone together but rather "a cool parting of the ways".

Sirk said "the story had to be completely un-Faulknerized" but "the characters in the film are still pretty close to Faulkner's."

Sirk said he had to shoot the film in black and white because Universal "didn't trust the story".

William Faulkner considered this film to be the best screen adaptation of his work.

Sirk did not feel Pylon was a suitable title. Zugsmith wanted to call the movie Sex in the Air. A Unviersal salesman came up with The Tarnished Angels.

== Release ==
The Tarnished Angels premiered in London in November 1957 and got its first American booking on Christmas Day 1957 in Charlotte, North Carolina, before going into general release.

== Reception ==
=== Critical ===
In his review in The New York Times, Bosley Crowther said the film "was badly, cheaply written by George Zuckerman and is abominably played by a hand-picked cast. The sentiments are inflated — blown out of all proportions to the values involved. And the acting, under Douglas Sirk's direction, is elaborate and absurd."

Variety called the film "a stumbling entry. Characters are mostly colorless, given static reading in drawn-out situations, and story line is lacking in punch."

=== Box office ===
The film was a minor box office success with rentals in 1958 of $1.5 million. This was significantly less than Written on the Wind. However Sirk claimed "the picture was rather successful."

=== Later reviews ===
More recent reviews, penned after a resurgence of interest and respect for Sirk's directing, are almost uniformly positive. In 1998, Jonathan Rosenbaum of the Chicago Reader included the film in his unranked list of the best American films not included on the AFI Top 100. Dave Kehr wrote in The New York Times: "The Tarnished Angels is among Sirk’s most self-conscious and artistically ambitious creations. ... This is bravura filmmaking in the service of a haunting vision. Yet there are moments of almost microscopic subtlety: the camera movement that expresses the moral reversal of the Hudson and Stack characters, one growing larger than the other; the infinite tenderness with which Hudson strokes Ms. Malone’s hair, helplessly trying to comfort her after a shock."

TV Guide rated the film four out of a possible four stars and called it "the best-ever adaptation of a Faulkner novel for the screen, directed with passion and perception by Sirk ... The acting is first-rate here, and the script is outstanding, full of wit, black humor, and occasional fine poetic monologues."

== See also ==
- List of American films of 1957

== Notes ==
- Sirk, Douglas (1997). Sirk on Sirk : conversations with Jon Halliday. Faber and Faber.
