= Douglas Sirk =

German film director (1897–1987)

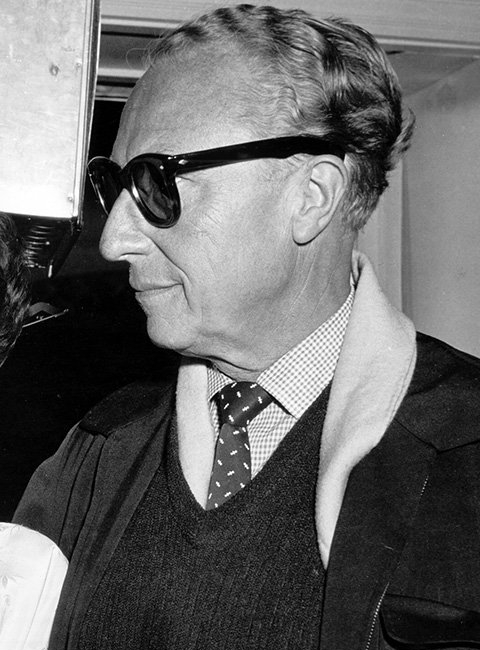
- Sirk in 1955
- Born: Hans Detlef Sierck; 26 April 1897; Hamburg, German Empire
- Died: 14 January 1987 (aged 89); Lugano, Ticino, Switzerland
- Years active: 1922–1979
- Spouses: Lydia Brinken (m. 1929–1934) Hilde Jary (m. 1934)
- Children: Klaus Detlef Sierck

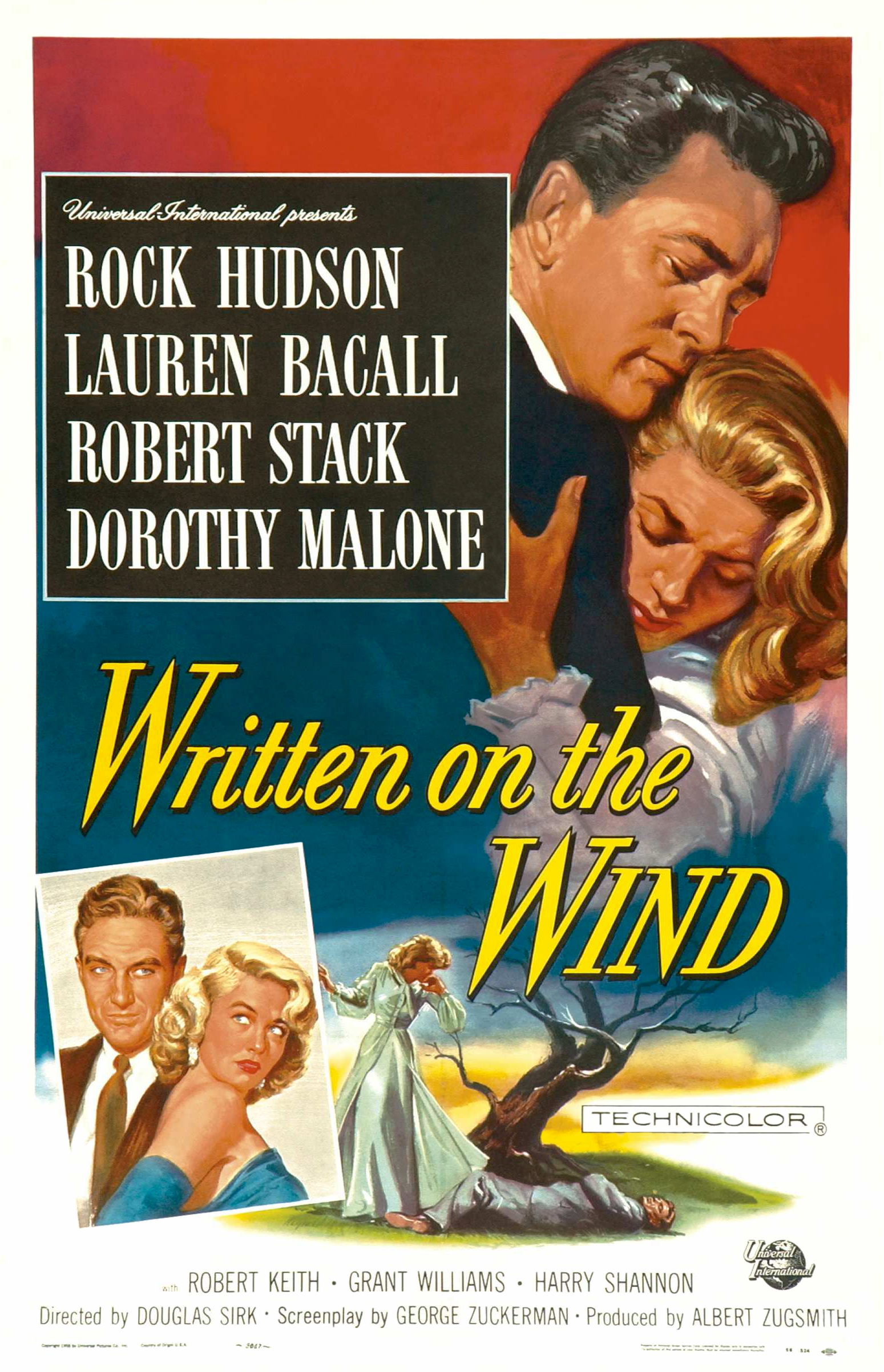
Poster for the film Written on the Wind

Douglas Sirk (born Hans Detlef Sierck; 26 April 1897 – 14 January 1987) was a German film director best known for the film melodramas he directed in Hollywood during the 1950s. However, he also directed comedies, westerns, and war films. Sirk started his career in Germany during the Weimar period as a stage and screen director, but he left for Hollywood in 1937 after his Jewish wife was persecuted by the Nazis.

In the 1950s, he achieved his greatest commercial success with the films Magnificent Obsession, All That Heaven Allows, Written on the Wind, A Time to Love and a Time to Die, and Imitation of Life. While those films were initially panned by critics as sentimental women's pictures, they are today widely regarded by film directors, critics, and scholars as masterpieces. His work is seen as a "critique of the bourgeoisie in general and of 1950s America in particular", while painting a "compassionate portrait of characters trapped by social conditions". Beyond the surface of the film, Sirk worked with complex mise-en-scène and lush Technicolor to underline his statements.

== Life and work ==
=== Early life and career in Germany ===
Sirk was born Hans Detlef Sierck on 26 April 1897, in Hamburg, of Danish parentage. His father was a newspaper reporter. He spent a few years in Denmark as a child, before his parents returned to Germany and became citizens. Sirk discovered the theatre in his mid-teens, particularly Shakespeare's history plays, and also began to frequent the cinema, where he first encountered what he later described as "dramas of swollen emotions"; one of his early screen favourites was Danish-born actress Asta Nielsen. In 1919, he enrolled to study law at the Ludwig-Maximilians-Universität München, but he left Munich following the violent collapse of a short-lived Bavarian Soviet Republic. Between stints at university, he began writing for his father's newspaper, not long before his father became a school principal.

Sirk continued his studies for a time at the University of Jena before transferring to the University of Hamburg, where he switched to philosophy and the history of art. It was here that he attended a lecture on relativity given by Albert Einstein. A major influence in this period was art historian Erwin Panofsky - Sirk was a select member of Panofsky's seminar group for a semester and wrote a large essay for him on the relationship between Medieval German painting and the mystery plays; in his 1971 interview with historian Jon Halliday, Sirk declared, "I owe Panofsky a lot." To support himself while studying, Sirk began working as a second-line dramaturg at the Deutsches Schauspielhaus in Hamburg. In 1922, substituting for a director who had fallen sick, Sirk directed his first production, the Hermann Bossdorf play Bahnmeister Tod ("Stationmaster Death"), which became a surprise success, and from that point Sirk was (in his own words) "lost to the theatre". In addition to the theatre, Sirk worked in many areas of the arts during this formative period - he painted, took a summer job as a set-designer at a Berlin film studio, published his own German translation of Shakespeare's sonnets, translated some of Shakespeare's plays, and published writings of his own.

Schauspielhaus manager Dr Paul Eger offered Sirk a pay raise and the chance to present "one of those crazy modern [i.e. expressionist] plays" but Sirk declared that he only wanted to direct "the classics" and took up an offer to become first director at a playhouse in Chemnitz in Saxony. The post proved to be a baptism of fire for the new director – although the company started out with classic works by Molière, Büchner and Strindberg, the season was disrupted when the theatre's main financier and manager gave up and vanished overnight, forcing the cast and crew to form a collective to keep the theatre going, and the program soon changed to comedies and melodramas – "things that made money". Although Sirk later recalled the period as "a pretty terrible time", it was here that he learned his craft, and how to handle actors in "the most strained circumstances". This was during the period of runaway inflation in Germany, and Sirk remembered that after distributing money to the company, they would have to run to the bank with their takings just before midday, because at 12 pm the banks would close their shutters and post the new dollar rate – "... if you got in too late, you had just a small percentage left of what you had earned ..."

With his first wife, the actress Lydia Brincken, Sirk fathered one son, Klaus Detlef Sierck (1925–1944), born on 30 March 1925 in Berlin-Charlottenburg, Germany. His ex-wife joined the Nazi party and because of Sirk's remarriage to a Jewish woman was able to legally bar him from seeing their son, who became one of the leading child actors of Nazi Germany, known for Die Saat geht auf (1935), Streit um den Knaben Jo (1937) and Kopf hoch, Johannes! (1941). He died as a soldier of the Panzer-Grenadier-Division Großdeutschland on 22 May 1944 near Novoaleksandrovka, Kirovograd Oblast, Ukrainian SSR, USSR (now Novooleksandrivka, Kirovohrad Oblast, Ukraine).

By the 1930s Sirk had become one of Germany's leading stage directors, with a list of credits that included a production of Brecht's The Threepenny Opera. Sirk joined UFA (Universum Film AG) studios in 1934, where he directed three shorts, followed by his first feature, April, April (1935), which was filmed in both German and Dutch versions. His exotic melodrama films Zu neuen Ufern and La Habanera made a star of the Nazi cinema out of Swedish singer Zarah Leander.

=== Career in the U.S. ===
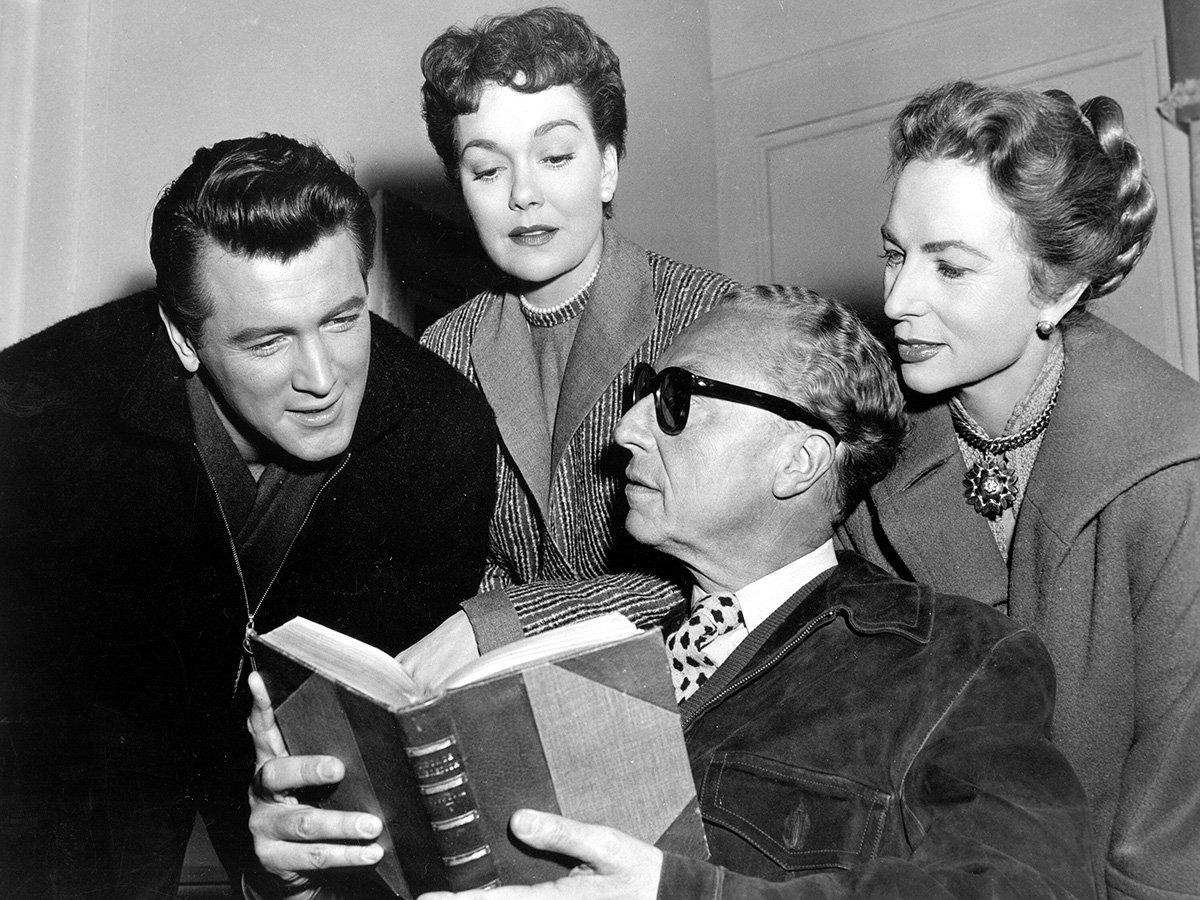
Sirk and actors on the set of All That Heaven Allows (1955). Left to right: Rock Hudson, Jane Wyman, Sirk, and Agnes Moorehead

Sirk left Germany in 1937 because of his political leanings and his Jewish (second) wife, actress Hilde Jary. Still in Europe he worked on films in Switzerland and the Netherlands. On arrival in the United States, he soon changed his German birth name to Douglas Sirk. By 1942, he was under contract to Columbia Pictures and directed PRC's stridently anti-Nazi film Hitler's Madman for Seymour Nebenzal, the legendary producer of Nero-Film, for whom Sirk also directed Summer Storm (1944).

Sirk briefly returned to Germany after the war ended, but returned to the U.S. and established his reputation with a series of lush, colorful melodramas for Universal-International Pictures from 1952 to 1959: Magnificent Obsession (1954), All That Heaven Allows (1955), Written on the Wind (1956), Battle Hymn (1957), The Tarnished Angels (1957), A Time to Love and a Time to Die (1958), and Imitation of Life (1959).

Despite the enormous success of Imitation of Life in 1959 (partially fueled by the scandal surrounding the murder of Lana Turner's boyfriend by her daughter), Sirk left the United States and retired from filmmaking. He died in Lugano, Switzerland, nearly 30 years later, with only a brief return behind the camera in West Germany in the 1970s, teaching at the film school Hochschule für Fernsehen und Film in Munich.

== Reputation and legacy ==
=== Contemporary reception ===
Sirk's melodramas of the 1950s, while highly commercially successful, were generally very poorly received by reviewers. His films were considered unimportant (because they revolve around female and domestic issues), banal (because of their focus on larger-than-life feelings) and unrealistic (because of their conspicuous and distinctive style). Their often melodramatic manner was viewed by critics as being in bad taste.

=== Later reception ===
Attitudes toward Sirk's films changed drastically in the late 1950s, 1960s and 1970s as his work was re-examined by French, American, and British critics. As Jean-Luc Godard wrote in his review of A Time to Love and a Time to Die (1958), "...I am going to write a madly enthusiastic review of Douglas Sirk's latest film, simply because it set my cheeks afire."

The major critical reappraisal of Sirk began in France with the April 1967 issue of Cahiers du cinéma, which included an extended interview with Sirk by Serge Daney and Jean-Louis Noames, an appreciation by Jean-Louis Comolli ("The Blind Man and the Mirror or The Impossible Cinema of Douglas Sirk"), and a "biofilmographie" compiled by Patrick Brion and Dominique Rabourdin. Leading American critic Andrew Sarris praised Sirk in his 1968 book The American Cinema: Directors and Directions 1929–1968, although Sirk failed to qualify for Sarris's controversial "pantheon" of great directors. From around 1970 there was a burgeoning interest among academic film scholars for Sirk's work – especially his American melodramas. The seminal work in this field was Jon Halliday's book-length interview, Sirk on Sirk (1971), which presented Sirk as "... a sophisticated intellectual, a filmmaker who arrived in Hollywood with a very clear vision, leaving behind him an established career in German theatre and film".

Several major revival seasons of Sirk's films followed over the next few years, including a 20-film retrospective at the 1972 Edinburgh Festival (Sirk attended), which also generated a book of essays. In 1974 the University of Connecticut Film Society programmed a complete retrospective of the director's American films, and invited Sirk to attend, but on the way to the airport, for the flight to New York, Sirk suffered a haemorrhage that seriously impaired the vision in his left eye.

Analyses of Sirk's work, with their emphases on aspects of Sirk's formerly-criticized style, revealed an oblique criticism of American society hidden beneath a banal facade of plotting conventional for the era – Sirk's films were now seen as masterpieces of irony. The criticism of the 1970s and early 1980s was dominated by an ideological take on Sirk's work, gradually changing from Marxist-inspired visions in the early 1970s, to a focus on gender and sexuality in the late 1970s and early 1980s. Film critic Roger Ebert has said, "To appreciate a film like Written on the Wind probably takes more sophistication to understand than one of Ingmar Bergman's masterpieces, because Bergman's themes are visible and underlined, while with Sirk the style conceals the message."

Sirk's reputation was also helped by a widespread nostalgia for old-fashioned Hollywood films in the 1970s. His work is now widely considered to show excellent control of visuals, extending from lighting and framing to costumes and sets that are saturated with symbolism and shot through with subtle barbs of irony.

== In popular culture ==
Sirk's films have been quoted in films by directors such as Rainer Werner Fassbinder (whose Ali: Fear Eats the Soul is partly based on All That Heaven Allows) and, later, Quentin Tarantino, Todd Haynes, Pedro Almodóvar, Wong Kar-wai, David Lynch, John Waters and Lars von Trier.

More specifically, Almodóvar's vibrant use of color in 1988's Women on the Verge of a Nervous Breakdown recalls the cinematography of Sirk's films of the 1950s, while Haynes' Far from Heaven was a conscious attempt to replicate a typical Sirk melodrama—in particular All That Heaven Allows. Tarantino paid homage to Sirk and his melodramatic style in Pulp Fiction, when character Vincent Vega, at a '50s-themed restaurant, orders the "Douglas Sirk steak" cooked "bloody as hell". Aki Kaurismäki alluded to Sirk as well; in his silent film, Juha, the villain's sport car is named "Sierck". Sirk was also one of the directors mentioned by Guillermo del Toro in his Oscar acceptance speech for Best Picture for The Shape of Water: "Growing up in Mexico as a kid, I was a big admirer of foreign film. Foreign film, like E.T., William Wyler, or Douglas Sirk, or Frank Capra."

Polyester (1981) directed by John Waters was, according to Waters, informed by Sirk's Universal melodramas.

== Awards ==
- 1985 Bavarian Film Award, Honorary Award

== Filmography ==
=== Feature films ===
- April, April! (1935)
  - 't Was één April (1936) (Dutch-language version of April, April)
- The Girl from the Marsh Croft (1935)
- Pillars of Society (1935)
- Schlußakkord (1936)
- The Court Concert (1936)
  - La Chanson du souvenir (1936) co-director (French-language version of The Court Concert)
- To New Shores (1937)
- La Habanera (1937)
- Final Accord (1938) (uncredited)
- Boefje (1939)
- Hitler's Madman (1943)
- Summer Storm (1944)
- A Scandal in Paris (1946)
- Lured (1947)
- Sleep, My Love (1948)
- Shockproof (1949)
- Slightly French (1949)
- Mystery Submarine (1950)
- The First Legion (1951)
- Thunder on the Hill (1951)
- The Lady Pays Off (1951)
- Week-End with Father (1951)
- No Room for the Groom (1952)
- Has Anybody Seen My Gal (1952)
- Meet Me at the Fair (1953)
- Take Me to Town (1953)
- All I Desire (1953)
- Taza, Son of Cochise (1954)
- Magnificent Obsession (1954)
- Sign of the Pagan (1954)
- Captain Lightfoot (1955)
- All That Heaven Allows (1955)
- There's Always Tomorrow (1956)
- Written on the Wind (1956)
- Battle Hymn (1957)
- Interlude (1957)
- The Tarnished Angels (1957)
- A Time to Love and a Time to Die (1958)
- Imitation of Life (1959)

=== Short films ===
- Zwei Windhunde / Zwei Genies (1934)
- Der eingebildete Kranke (1935)
- 3 x Ehe (1935)
- The Christian Brothers at Mont La Salle (1941)
- Sprich zu mir wie der Regen (1975) co-director with group of film students
- Sylvesternacht (1977) co-director with group of film students
- Bourbon Street Blues (1979) co-director with group of film students

=== Other work ===
- Darling of the Sailors (1937, co-screenwriter)
- The Strange Woman (1946, uncredited supervisor of reshoots)
- Against All Flags (1952, uncredited supervisor of reshoots)
- Never Say Goodbye (1956, uncredited supervisor of reshoots)
