= Tarzan in film, television and other non-print media =

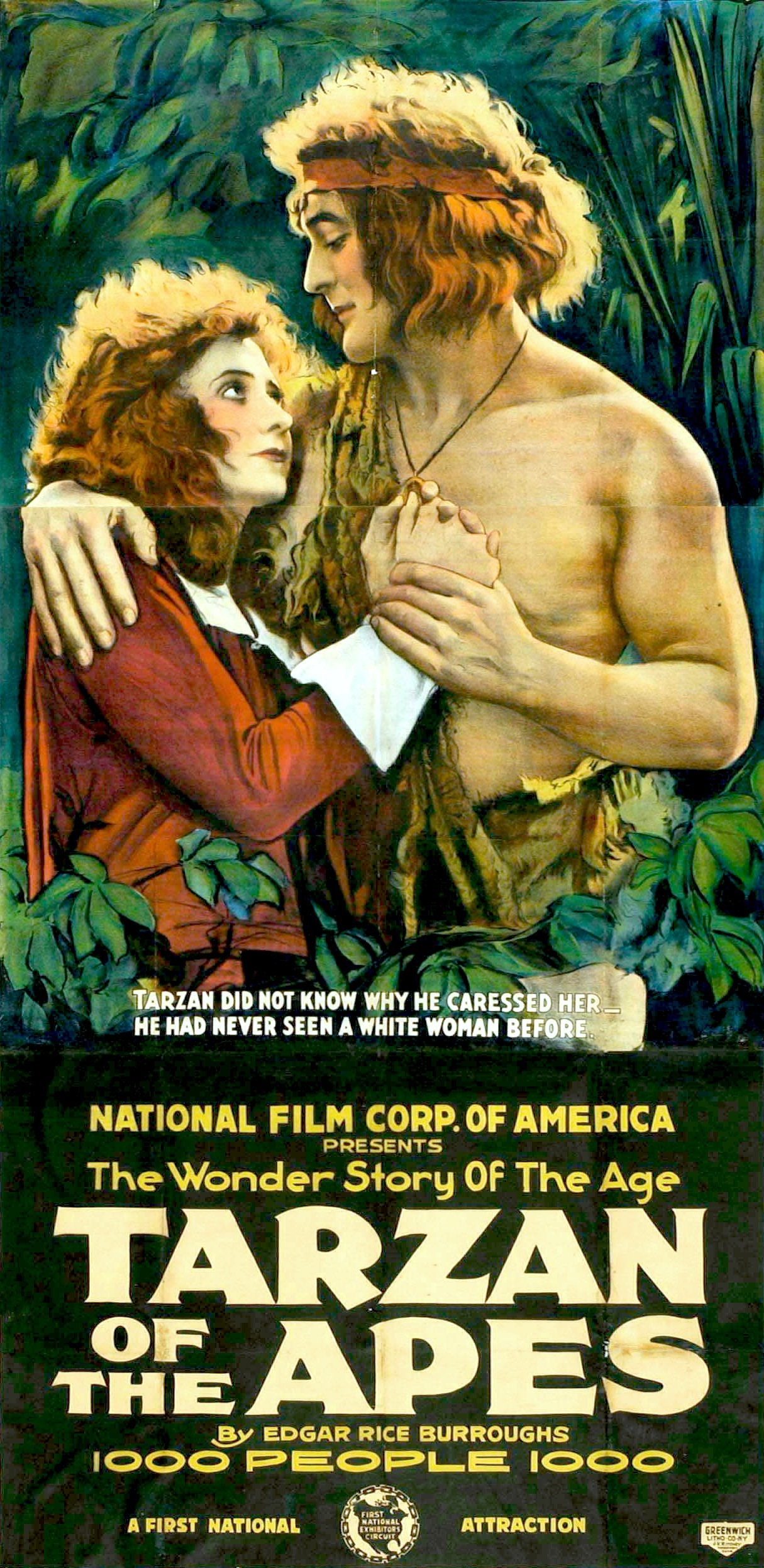
Film poster for the first Tarzan movie in 1918, starring Elmo Lincoln

Tarzan, a fictional character created by Edgar Rice Burroughs, first appeared in the 1912 novel Tarzan of the Apes, and then in twenty-four sequels by Burroughs and numerous more by other authors. The character proved immensely popular and quickly made the jump to other media, first and most notably to comics and film.

== Film ==
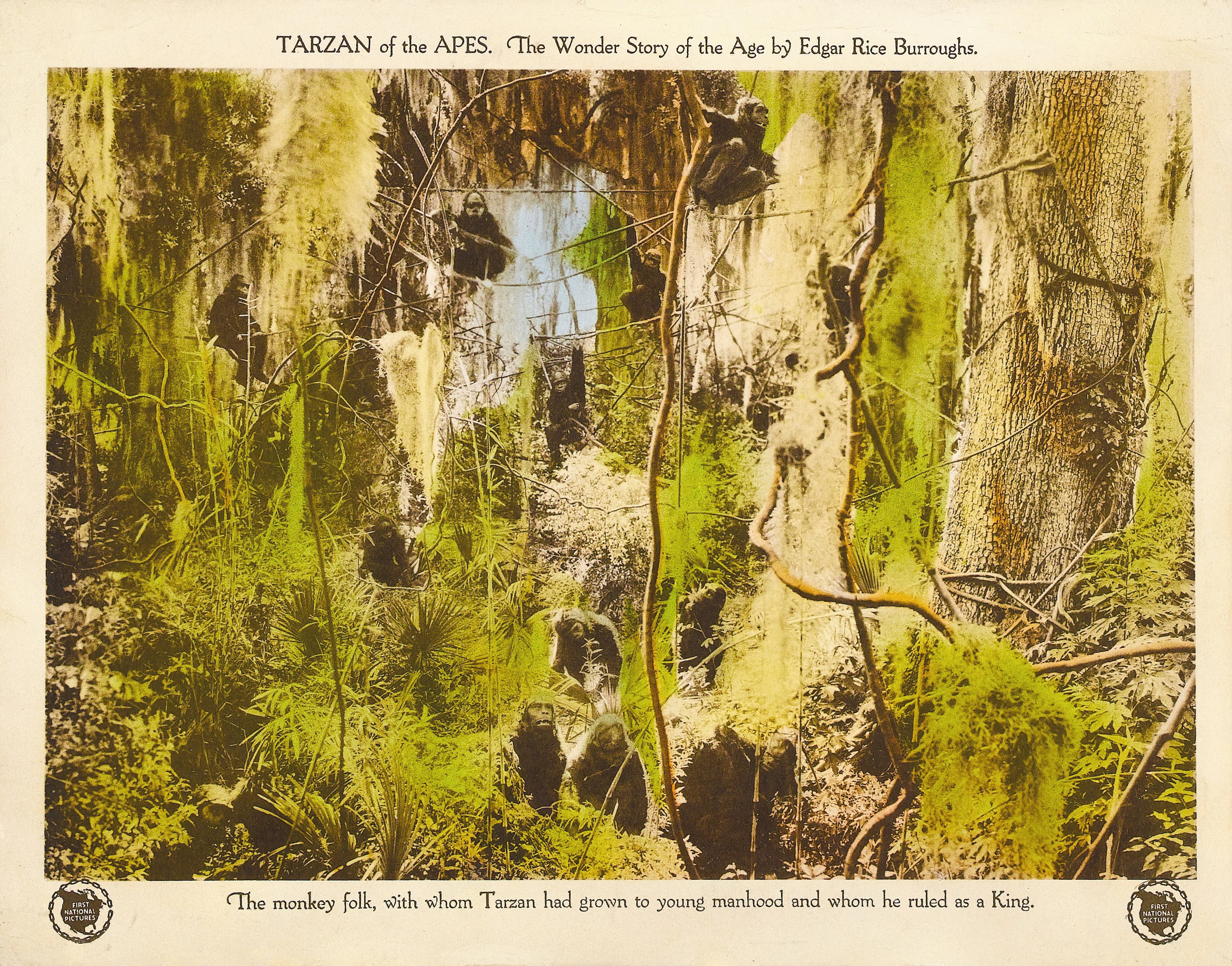
The lobby card from the silent 1918 incarnation of Tarzan of the Apes

The earlier Tarzan films were silent pictures adapted from the original Tarzan novels which appeared within a few years of the character's creation. With the advent of talking pictures, a popular Tarzan movie franchise was developed, which was anchored by actor Johnny Weissmüller in the title role, which lasted from 1932 to 1948. Tarzan films under Weissmüller often featured the character's chimpanzee companion, Cheeta. Later Tarzan films after Weissmüller have been occasional and somewhat idiosyncratic.

=== Silent film ===
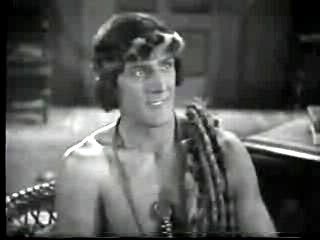
Frank Merrill as Tarzan in Tarzan the Tiger (1929)

The earlier Tarzan films were eight silent features and serials released between 1918 and 1929, most based on novels in the original series. Elmo Lincoln starred in the first Tarzan feature, Tarzan of the Apes (1918), a faithful cinematic rendering of Burroughs' first Tarzan novel. The first portion of the film featured Gordon Griffith as the young Tarzan, so Griffith could technically be considered the first screen Tarzan. (Early in the film, Tarzan is also shown as a baby played by at least two different uncredited children.) Elmo Lincoln returned for two sequels. Additional silents were produced in the 1920s with other actors (three of these films – The Romance of Tarzan (1918, Elmo Lincoln), The Revenge of Tarzan (1920, Gene Pollar), and Tarzan the Mighty (1928, Frank Merrill) – have been lost). One of the silents, Tarzan and the Golden Lion (1927), featured the then-unknown Boris Karloff as a villainous native chieftain. Other actors who portrayed the character in 1920s films were P. Dempsey Tabler and James Pierce (who married the daughter of Edgar Rice Burroughs). The first Tarzan sound film was Tarzan the Tiger (1929), featuring Frank Merrill as the Ape Man, shot as a silent but partially dubbed for release. It was Merrill’s second Tarzan movie, and it cost him the role, as his voice was deemed unsuitable for the part.

=== The Weissmüller era ===
Me Tarzan, You Jane

The “Me Tarzan, You Jane” cliché probably originates from telescoping the dialogue of Tarzan and Jane’s first meeting in Tarzan the Ape Man (1932). The film's dialogue was written by the British actor/composer Ivor Novello.:

Jane Parker: Thank you for protecting me.

Tarzan: Me?

Jane Parker: I said, thank you for protecting me.

Tarzan: [points at Jane] Me?

Jane Parker: No. I'm only "Me" for me.

Tarzan: [points at Jane] Me.

Jane Parker: No. To you, I'm "You."

Tarzan: [points at himself] You.

Jane Parker: No... [Thinks for a second]

Jane Parker: I'm Jane Parker. Understand? Jane, Jane.

Tarzan: [points at Jane] Jane, Jane.

Jane Parker: Yes, Jane. And you? [Tarzan stares]

Jane Parker: [points at herself] Jane.

Tarzan: Jane.

Jane Parker: [points at Tarzan] And you?

Tarzan: Tarzan. Tarzan.

Jane Parker: Tarzan...

Another dialogue moment that comes close is in Tarzan’s New York Adventure (1943). Tarzan emphasizes the couple’s mutual affection by pointing and saying “Tarzan…Jane…Jane…Tarzan.”

The most popular series of Tarzan films began with Tarzan the Ape Man (1932), starring Johnny Weissmüller and Maureen O'Sullivan. Weissmüller, the son of ethnic-German immigrants from the Hungarian part of Austria-Hungary, was already well known as a five-time Olympic gold medalist in swimming. He became the most famous and longest-lasting screen Tarzan, starring as the Ape Man in a total of twelve films, through 1948, the first six produced by Metro-Goldwyn-Mayer and the final six from RKO. The beauteous and scantily clad O'Sullivan was a major factor in the early popularity of the series. The role of Jane in the films was reduced after O'Sullivan departed in 1942 following the sixth film in the series (and the last for MGM), Tarzan's New York Adventure. Two Jane-less films followed before Brenda Joyce took over the role for the last four Weissmüller Tarzan films.

Starting afresh with an extremely free adaptation of Tarzan of the Apes which threw out everything that had gone before, the Weissmüller series was a boon to the franchise if not to the character. In contrast to the articulate nobleman of Burroughs's novels, Weissmuller's Tarzan was a natural hero with a limited vocabulary. The ersatz pidgin of his dialogue has often been mocked as "Me Tarzan, you Jane," although that particular line was never spoken in any of the films (see insert).

Tarzan and Jane were clearly married in the novels, but their legal status was left ambiguous in the Weissmuller films, even though they shared a jungle treehouse and (particularly in the second film of the series, Tarzan and His Mate) a strong sexual chemistry. In keeping with Motion Picture Production Code requirements, their son "Boy" was found and adopted rather than born to Jane. The "Boy" character, played by Johnny Sheffield, appeared in eight consecutive films in the series, starting with Tarzan Finds a Son (1939). Weissmüller's yodel-like "Tarzan yell" became so associated with the character that it was sometimes dubbed into later films featuring different actors. Cheeta the chimpanzee provided comic relief through the series.

=== Competing films of the 1930s ===
Due to complex licensing issues relating to Tarzan, a number of competing films starring other actors were made during the Weissmüller period. The first of these was Tarzan the Fearless (1933), released as both a 12-chapter serial and as an edited feature film under the same title. It starred another Olympic swimmer, 1932 gold medalist Buster Crabbe, and was the first Tarzan film produced by Sol Lesser, later to become producer of the franchise when it moved to RKO. Crabbe went on to a career in B-films and television, including portrayals of space opera heroes Flash Gordon and Buck Rogers.

The New Adventures of Tarzan (1935), hearkening back to the original concept of the character as an intelligent Englishman, was a serial featuring Herman Brix that was reedited into two feature films, the first released in the same year and with the same title as the serial, and the second, Tarzan and the Green Goddess released in 1938. Edgar Rice Burroughs had a financial interest in the production. Brix, another Olympian (shotput) changed his name in 1939 and, as Bruce Bennett, enjoyed a long career in film and television.

Tarzan's Revenge, released in 1938, starred Glenn Morris, gold medal winner in the Olympic decathlon in 1936, a feat documented in part two of Leni Riefenstahl's film Olympia. Morris was thus the fourth Olympian to play Tarzan. His co-star was Olympic swimmer Eleanor Holm who won a gold medal in 1932 and was expelled from the 1936 Olympics under controversial circumstances. She played a Jane-like character named Eleanor. This film was also produced by Sol Lesser. It was poorly reviewed, causing Morris to abandon any thoughts of a further film career.

With the exception of The New Adventures of Tarzan, which was partially filmed in Guatemala, the Tarzan movies of this period were mostly filmed on Hollywood sound stages and backlots, with stock jungle and wildlife footage edited into the final product.

=== The franchise after Weissmüller ===
After Tarzan and the Mermaids in 1948, Weissmuller retired from the series, believing that he was now too old to play the loincloth-clad character. He went on, however, to appear in a long series of similar adventures wearing a safari suit as Jungle Jim.

After Weissmüller's departure, producer Sol Lesser led a nationwide search for a replacement, auditioning over 200 actors. The winner was Lex Barker, a tall and strikingly handsome 29-year-old who had grown up in wealth and privilege in New York City. Barker portrayed Tarzan in five films (1949–1953), each with a different actress portraying Jane (the first one being Brenda Joyce, a carry-over from the Weissmüller series). These were mostly low budget affairs similar to Weissmuller's RKO films, although the third one, Tarzan's Peril (1951), was an attempt to upgrade the series by filming on actual African locations and using local Africans in the cast. Despite Barker's aristocratic bearing and good acting credentials, Lesser insisted that he emulate Weissmüller's "Me Tarzan, you Jane" characterization.

Next came six films starring Gordon Scott (1955–1960), a bodybuilder who was discovered while lifeguarding at a hotel in Las Vegas. His first three Tarzan films, produced by Sol Lesser, continued in the Weissmüller formula. Lesser also produced several episodes of a Tarzan television pilot starring Scott that was edited into a feature film called Tarzan and the Trappers.

Then the series was taken over by producer Sy Weintraub, who wanted to move the character closer to Burroughs's original conception. The result starred Scott in two of the best-received entries in the entire franchise, Tarzan's Greatest Adventure (1959) and Tarzan the Magnificent (1960). Weintraub's films abandoned the "Me Tarzan, you Jane" aspect of the character, with Scott (and the actors that followed) speaking normally.

MGM released a remake of Tarzan, the Ape Man in 1959, a poorly received film starring Denny Miller.

The Weintraub series continued in two films featuring veteran stuntman Jock Mahoney (1962–1963), three with former pro-football player Mike Henry (1966–1968), and two (feature versions of television episodes) with Ron Ely (1970). The Mike Henry films were filmed before the Ron Ely TV series, but were released to theatres after the TV series debuted. Weintraub had intended Henry to star in the TV series, but Henry declined because of the injuries and illnesses he had suffered during back to back location filming.

The Weintraub productions, including the Ron Ely television series (see below), dropped the character of Jane and portrayed Tarzan as an intelligent but apparently rootless adventurer. The Mike Henry entries, starting with Tarzan and the Valley of Gold (1966), were produced at the height of the James Bond craze, and had a well-tailored Tarzan jetting around the world to take on dangerous missions; clean-cut Henry also closely resembled then-current Bond actor Sean Connery (who had coincidentally earlier played a villain in Tarzan's Greatest Adventure). In contrast to most earlier Tarzan films, the Weintraub productions were in color and were shot in exotic locations such as Kenya, India, Thailand, Malaysia, Mexico, and Brazil.

By 1965, films starring Tarzan had collectively grossed over $750,000,000 (equivalent to $7,660,000,000 in 2025) worldwide, making him the highest-grossing film character up until then. Tarzan's total gross greatly exceeded that of John Wayne, who was the highest-grossing actor at the time.

=== Later films ===
After 1970, the movie Tarzan went on hiatus until 1981, when MGM released its third version of Tarzan, the Ape Man with Miles O'Keeffe in the title role and Bo Derek as Jane. The film was financially successful, but critically panned.

The better-received Greystoke: The Legend of Tarzan, Lord of the Apes followed in 1984, starring Christopher Lambert. Returning to the source material, it updated Burroughs' original novel in the light of 1980s sensibilities and science, utilizing a number of corrective ideas first put forth by science fiction author Philip José Farmer in his 1972 mock-biography Tarzan Alive: A Definitive Biography of Lord Greystoke. While restoring Tarzan’s identity as an intelligent human being, Greystoke portrayed his adaptation to civilization as a failure, and his return to the wild as a matter of necessity rather than choice.

The next live-action Tarzan movie was Tarzan and the Lost City (1998) which starred Casper Van Dien. Essentially a follow-on to Greystoke, this film was set in the 1920s and attempted to capture the flavor of some of the later novels in the Tarzan series, in which the ape-man encountered increasingly fantastic civilizations hidden in the deep jungles.

The latest live-action Tarzan film The Legend of Tarzan (2016), produced by Warner Bros. Pictures and Jerry Weintraub & directed by David Yates, was released on July 1, 2016. It stars Alexander Skarsgård and Margot Robbie as Tarzan and Jane, along with Samuel L. Jackson, Christoph Waltz and Djimon Hounsou. The new approach blended the characters and the setting from the Burroughs novels with the events and atrocities in the Congo Free State in the late 1880s and historical figures with a significant role at the time, such as Leon Rom as portrayed by Waltz.

On September 30, 2022, The Hollywood Reporter announced that Sony Pictures has picked up the screen rights to Tarzan and is looking to deliver a "total reinvention" of the character.

=== Animated films ===
Disney's animated Tarzan (1999) marked a new beginning for the ape man, taking its inspiration equally from Burroughs and Greystoke: The Legend of Tarzan, Lord of the Apes. Its major innovations were recasting the original fictitious ape species that adopted Tarzan as gorillas and turning William Cecil Clayton, his paternal cousin and rival for the affections of Jane in the early novels, into a brawny out-and-out villain known only as "Clayton." Tarzan was voiced by actor Tony Goldwyn with a Tarzan yell vocalized by Brian Blessed and Jane by Minnie Driver.

Two direct-to-video sequels followed, Tarzan & Jane (2002), and Tarzan II (2005), a re-exploration of the ape man's childhood. In Tarzan & Jane, Goldwyn and Driver were replaced by Michael T. Weiss and Olivia d'Abo.

Also in 1999, a direct-to-video animated version of Tarzan of the Apes aimed at younger children was released by Sony Wonder.

In 2013, Germany's Constantin Film released a Tarzan 3D animated feature in CGI with motion capture. Reinhard Klooss directed. Kellan Lutz and Spencer Locke voiced Tarzan and Jane Porter, respectively. The film opened in a number of countries in late 2013 and early 2014, but received mostly negative reviews and as a result no theatrical release was planned for the U.S. Instead, the film was released directly to DVD and Blu-ray in the U.S. in August 2014.

=== Other ===
The film Tarzan corpus also includes a number of documentaries, most of them either made for television or to accompany video sets of Tarzan movies, a number of derivative foreign-language productions from China, India, and Turkey, and various spoofs and parodies. Among the latter is Starzan, a Philippine Cinema comedy film loosely based on the original Tarzan franchise satirizing western entertainment. It stars Filipino comedic actor Joey De Leon as Starzan, Rene Requiestas as "Chitae", and Zsa Zsa Padilla as Jane.

Steve Sipek also known as Steve Hawkes played Tarzan in two films produced by a Spanish company and intended for world markets. The first was variously titled Tarzán en la gruta del oro/King of the Jungle/Tarzan in the Golden Grotto (1969) and portions were filmed in Suriname, Florida, Africa, Spain and Italy, with interruptions when the producers ran out of money. Sipek claimed the film company could not pay the huge licensing fees from Edgar Rice Burroughs' estate and settled for the name "Zan" or "Karzan" for the character.

A 1972 sequel, Tarzan and the Brown Prince (1972), had portions filmed in Rainbow Springs, Florida. where Sipek was burned in a fire that got out of control.

== Stage ==
A 1921 Broadway production of Tarzan of The Apes starred Ronald Adair as Tarzan and Ethel Dwyer as Jane Porter.

In 1976, Richard O'Brien wrote a musical entitled T. Zee, loosely based on the idea of Tarzan but restyled in a rock idiom.

Tarzan, a musical stage adaptation of the 1999 animated feature, opened at the Richard Rodgers Theatre on Broadway on May 10, 2006. The show, a Disney Theatrical production, was directed and designed by Bob Crowley. The show played its final performance on July 8, 2007. Tarzan was played by Josh Strickland. Jane was played by Jenn Gambatese. Terk, Tarzan's best friend, was played by Chester Gregory. Kerchak, Tarzan's ape father was played by Shuler Hensley and Robert Evan. Kala, Tarzan's ape mother was played by Merle Dandridge. Professor Porter (Jane's father) was played by Tim Jerome. Mr. Clayton (Jane's "love interest") was played by Donnie Keshawarz. Young Tarzan was played by Daniel Manche, Dylan Riley Snyder, J. Bradley Bowers, and Alex Rutherford.

The same version of Tarzan that was played at the Richard Rodgers Theatre played throughout Europe and was a success in the Netherlands.

Tarzan also appeared in the Tarzan Rocks! show at the Theatre in the Wild at Walt Disney World Resort's Disney's Animal Kingdom. The show closed in 2006. The Tarzan Encounter currently plays in Disneyland Park (Paris), similar to the show at Disney's Animal Kingdom.

== Radio ==
See main article, Tarzan (radio program).

James H. Pierce and Joan Burroughs Pierce starred in the 1932–34 Tarzan radio series

Tarzan was the hero of two popular radio programs. The first began on 12 September 1932 with James H. Pierce in the role of Tarzan, adapting the novel Tarzan of the Apes in 77 installments, airing three times each week, on Monday, Wednesday, and Friday. Each episode, not counting commercials, ran for about ten minutes. This series was followed by two original stories, written by Rob Thompson, "Tarzan and the Diamond of Ashair", 39 episodes airing every weekday starting 1 May 1935, and "Tarzan and the Fires of Tohr", 39 episodes, airing during 1936. Both of these stories Rob Thompson later adapted for the Tarzan comic strip and again for the Dell Tarzan comic book.

The second Tarzan radio program began 1 November 1951 and ran for 75 half-hour episodes, ending on 27 June 1953. Lamont Johnson played Tarzan.

== Television ==
Meanwhile, television had emerged as a primary vehicle bringing the character to the public, as the corpus of Tarzan films, especially those of Johnny Weissmuller and Lex Barker, became staples on Saturday morning TV. In 1958, in the middle of his six-film reign as Tarzan, Gordon Scott filmed three episodes for a prospective television series. The program did not sell, and in 1966 the three pilots were edited into a 90-minute television feature entitled Tarzan and the Trappers.

A live action Tarzan series starring Ron Ely ran on NBC 1966–1968 (57 hour-long episodes). The executive producer was Sy Weintraub, and the series was basically a follow-on to Weintraub's series of Tarzan films that began with Tarzan's Greatest Adventure in 1959. Weintraub had dispensed with Jane and portrayed his ape man as well-spoken and sophisticated. Though Ely's Tarzan did not have Jane, he was accompanied by Cheeta the chimpanzee from the movies and a child sidekick, the orphan boy Jai (Manuel Padilla, Jr.), who also played the similar roles of Ramel and Pepe in Tarzan and the Valley of Gold (1966) and Tarzan and the Great River (1967). The character Jai first appeared in the 1962 film Tarzan Goes to India, played by a young actor of the same name. A pair of two-part episodes from this series was also released to theaters as feature films under the titles Tarzan's Jungle Rebellion (1967) and Tarzan's Deadly Silence (1970).

An animated series from Filmation, Tarzan, Lord of the Jungle, aired from 1976–1977, with new and repeat episodes in the anthology programs Batman/Tarzan Adventure Hour (1977–1978), Tarzan and the Super 7 (1978–1980), The Tarzan/Lone Ranger Adventure Hour (1980–1981), and The Tarzan/Lone Ranger/Zorro Adventure Hour) (1981–1982). In that show, Tarzan is voiced by Robert Ridgely and Danton Burroughs.

Following this Joe Lara starred in the title role in Tarzan in Manhattan (1989), an offbeat TV movie, and would later return in a completely different interpretation in Tarzan: The Epic Adventures (1996), a new live-action series. In between the two productions with Lara, Tarzán, a half-hour syndicated series, ran from 1991 through 1994. In this version of the show, Tarzan was portrayed by Wolf Larson as a blond environmentalist, with Jane turned into a French ecologist.

Disney’s animated series The Legend of Tarzan (2001–2003) was a spin-off from its animated film with Michael T. Weiss as the voice of Tarzan (see Tarzan and Jane in "Animated Films" above).

The latest television series was the live-action Tarzan (2003), which starred male model Travis Fimmel and updated the setting to contemporary New York City with Jane as a police detective. The series failed to meet studio expectations and was cancelled after only eight episodes.

Netflix aired an animated series titled Edgar Rice Burroughs’ Tarzan and Jane set in modern-day where 16-year-old Tarzan (voiced by Giles Panton) returns from the African jungle to a London boarding school where he meets Jane (voiced by Rebecca Shoichet), who helps him solve environmental injustice, crimes and mysteries.

ABS-CBN's Noah, aired from July 12, 2010 to February 4, 2011, have a premise similar to Tarzan.

== Television sketches/spoofs ==
In the film Hollywood Party (1934), Jimmy Durante parodies Tarzan as Schnarzan. (The Shnoz + Tarzan = Schnarzan).

On The Carol Burnett Show (1967-1978) (CBS), Carol was often called upon to demonstrate her trademark Tarzan yell.

A 1981 television special, The Muppets Go to the Movies, features a short sketch entitled "Tarzan and Jane". Lily Tomlin plays Jane opposite The Great Gonzo as Tarzan. In addition, the Muppets have made reference to Tarzan on half a dozen occasions since the 1960s.

The Tonight Show Starring Johnny Carson on August 14, 1981 featured a Tarzan sketch in which Johnny Carson and Betty White portray Tarzan and Jane as a bickering married couple.

In an episode of The Fairly OddParents, a spoof of Tarzan appears as "Lord of the Drapes", and "Lord of the Shapes", instead of Lord of the Apes.

Series one, episode two of The Two Ronnies includes a "Tarzan in Suburbia" sketch with Ronnie Barker as Tarzan.

The British ITV Schools series Writers' Workshop has a 1976 episode called "Our Hero", discussing the character of Tarzan and featuring Arne Gordon as Tarzan in an extended sketch.

Saturday Night Live featured recurring sketches with the speech-impaired trio of "Tonto, Tarzan, and Frankenstein's Monster". In these sketches, Tarzan is portrayed by Kevin Nealon.

The Japanese Jungle no Ouja Ta-chan (King of the Jungle Ta-chan) series, originally a manga by Tokuhiro Masaya, was based loosely on Tarzan. It featured the characters of Tarzan and his wife Jane, who had become obese after settling down with Tarzan. The series begins as a comical parody of Tarzan, but later expands to other settings, such as a martial arts tournament in China, professional wrestling in America, and even a fight with vampires.

In another anime, One Piece, Roronoa Zoro is seen doing a Tarzan call imitation during the Skypiea arc.

== Video games ==
Taito's 1982 arcade game Jungle King featured a character who resembled Tarzan. Copyright issues required Taito to rename the game, producing Jungle Hunt. The company retained the original character, albeit dressed in safari clothing complete with pith helmet. Gameplay remained unchanged; the player still fought crocodiles and swung from trees, but by ropes instead of vines. Jungle Hunt was subsequently adapted for play on numerous video game consoles and personal computers.

Tarzan Goes Ape was released in the 1980s for the Commodore 64.

Martech Games Ltd released Tarzan in 1986 for the ZX Spectrum, among other computing platforms.

In 1999, games based on Disney's animated film Tarzan were released for the PlayStation, Windows, and Game Boy Color. The PlayStation and Windows version was later ported to the Nintendo 64 in 2000.

Other games focusing on Disney's version of Tarzan include Tarzan Untamed (2001) for the PlayStation 2 and GameCube and Tarzan: Return to the Jungle (2002) for the Game Boy Advance. Characters from the animated film have also appeared in Disney's Extreme Skate Adventure and Kingdom Hearts.

In the first Rayman, a Tarzanesque version of Rayman named Tarayzan appears in the Dream Forest.

== Miscellaneous ==
There have been several Tarzan View-Master reels and packets, plus numerous Tarzan coloring books, children's books, follow-the-dots and activity books.

In the film Histoire de Pen there is a character named after Tarzan and another named after The Phantom.

"Superman's Song", the 1991 debut single by Canadian rock band the Crash Test Dummies, compares Tarzan unfavourably to Superman.

One Leg Too Few is a comedy sketch by Peter Cook concerning a one-legged man attempting to audition for the role of Tarzan.

There is a song by Danish pop group Toy-Box called "Tarzan & Jane", first released as a single in Germany in 1998, and then released worldwide in 1999 to coincide with the release of the Disney film Tarzan (see "Film").

== Authorized filmography ==
=== Silents Era ===
Feature Films:

Studio	Film title	Starring	Produced by	Directed by	Theatrical release	DVD release	Notes
National Film Corporation of America	Tarzan of the Apes	Elmo Lincoln	William Parsons	Scott Sidney	1918	The Film Detective: The Tarzan Vault Collection	based on the first part of the novel Tarzan of the Apes
National Film Corporation of America	The Romance of Tarzan	Elmo Lincoln	William Parsons; Isadore Bernstein	Wilfred Lucas	1918	(considered lost)	based on the second part of the novel Tarzan of the Apes
Goldwyn Pictures	The Revenge of Tarzan	Gene Pollar	Samuel Goldwyn; Edgar Rice Burroughs	Harry Revier; George M. Merrick	1920	(considered lost)	Based on the first part of the novel The Return of Tarzan
Film Booking Offices of America	Tarzan and the Golden Lion	James Pierce	Edwin C. King	J. P. McGowan	1927	Alpha Home Entertainment DVD	based on the novel Tarzan and the Golden Lion. Cast includes Boris Karloff.

==== Silent Serials ====
Studio	Film title	Starring	Produced by	Directed by	Theatrical release	DVD release	Notes
National Film Corporation of America	The Son of Tarzan	P. Dempsey Tabler	David P. Howells	Arthur J. Flaven; Harry Revier	1920	Alpha Home Entertainment DVD	Based on the novel The Son of Tarzan
Numa Pictures Corporation	The Adventures of Tarzan	Elmo Lincoln	Louis Weiss	Robert F. Hill; Scott Sidney	1921	The Film Detective: The Tarzan Vault Collection	Based on the second part of the novel The Return of Tarzan
Universal Pictures	Tarzan the Mighty	Frank Merrill	Unknown	Jack Nelson; Ray Taylor	1928	(considered lost)	Though nominally based on Jungle Tales of Tarzan, it is mostly an original story and includes only a few scenes and themes from that collection of short stories.
Universal Pictures	Tarzan the Tiger	Frank Merrill	Unknown	Henry MacRae	1929	Alpha Home Entertainment DVD	Based on the novel Tarzan and the Jewels of Opar; Filmed as a silent but partially dubbed to become the first Tarzan sound film; Last silent serial

=== Sound Era ===
Franchise films:

Studio	Film title	Starring	Produced by	Directed by	Theatrical release	DVD release	Notes
Metro-Goldwyn-Mayer	Tarzan the Ape Man	Johnny Weissmuller	Irving Thalberg	W. S. Van Dyke	1932	WB: The Tarzan Collection Starring Johnny Weissmuller	First MGM film
Metro-Goldwyn-Mayer	Tarzan and His Mate	Johnny Weissmuller	Bernard H. Hyman	Cedric Gibbons	1934	WB: The Tarzan Collection Starring Johnny Weissmuller	
Metro-Goldwyn-Mayer	Tarzan Escapes	Johnny Weissmuller	Bernard H. Hyman; Philip Goldstone; Jack Cummings	Richard Thorpe	1936	WB: The Tarzan Collection Starring Johnny Weissmuller	
Metro-Goldwyn-Mayer	Tarzan Finds a Son!	Johnny Weissmuller	Sam Zimbalist	Richard Thorpe	1939	WB: The Tarzan Collection Starring Johnny Weissmuller	Johnny Sheffield debuts as "Boy"
Metro-Goldwyn-Mayer	Tarzan's Secret Treasure	Johnny Weissmuller	B.P. Fineman	Richard Thorpe	1941	WB: The Tarzan Collection Starring Johnny Weissmuller	
Metro-Goldwyn-Mayer	Tarzan's New York Adventure	Johnny Weissmuller	Frederick Stephani	Richard Thorpe	1942	WB: The Tarzan Collection Starring Johnny Weissmuller	sixth and final appearance of Maureen O'Sullivan as Jane; Last MGM film
RKO Pictures	Tarzan Triumphs	Johnny Weissmuller	Sol Lesser	Wilhelm Thiele	1943	WB: The Tarzan Collection Starring Johnny Weissmuller: Volume Two	franchise moves from MGM to RKO under producer Sol Lesser. Jane does not appear in this or the next film.
RKO Pictures	Tarzan’s Desert Mystery	Johnny Weissmuller	Sol Lesser	Wilhelm Thiele	1943	WB: The Tarzan Collection Starring Johnny Weissmuller: Volume Two	
RKO Pictures	Tarzan and the Amazons	Johnny Weissmuller	Sol Lesser	Kurt Neumann	1945	WB: The Tarzan Collection Starring Johnny Weissmuller: Volume Two	Jane returns to the series, now played by Brenda Joyce.
RKO Pictures	Tarzan and the Leopard Woman	Johnny Weissmuller	Sol Lesser	Kurt Neumann	1946	WB: The Tarzan Collection Starring Johnny Weissmuller: Volume Two	
RKO Pictures	Tarzan and the Huntress	Johnny Weissmuller	Sol Lesser	Kurt Neumann	1947	WB: The Tarzan Collection Starring Johnny Weissmuller: Volume Two	eighth and last appearance of Johnny Sheffield as "Boy"
RKO Pictures	Tarzan and the Mermaids	Johnny Weissmuller	Sol Lesser	Robert Florey	1948	WB: The Tarzan Collection Starring Johnny Weissmuller: Volume Two	Last film to star Weissmuller partially filmed in Mexico
RKO Pictures	Tarzan's Magic Fountain	Lex Barker	Sol Lesser	Lee Sholem	1949	WB: The Tarzan Collection Starring Lex Barker	first film to star Lex Barker. Fifth and final appearance of Brenda Joyce as Jane.
RKO Pictures	Tarzan and the Slave Girl	Lex Barker	Sol Lesser	Lee Sholem	1950	WB: The Tarzan Collection Starring Lex Barker	
RKO Pictures	Tarzan's Peril	Lex Barker	Sol Lesser	Byron Haskin	1951	WB: The Tarzan Collection Starring Lex Barker	partially filmed in Kenya
RKO Pictures	Tarzan's Savage Fury	Lex Barker	Sol Lesser	Cy Endfield	1952	WB: The Tarzan Collection Starring Lex Barker	
RKO Pictures	Tarzan and the She-Devil	Lex Barker	Sol Lesser	Kurt Neumann	1953	WB: The Tarzan Collection Starring Lex Barker	Final film to star Lex Barker
RKO Pictures	Tarzan's Hidden Jungle	Gordon Scott	Sol Lesser	Harold D. Schuster	1955	WB: The Tarzan Collection Starring Gordon Scott	First film to star Gordon Scott; Final RKO Picture produced film. Final Black-and-white film originally produced for theaters.
Metro-Goldwyn-Mayer	Tarzan and the Lost Safari	Gordon Scott	Sol Lesser; John Croydon	H. Bruce Humberstone	1957	WB: The Tarzan Collection Starring Gordon Scott	first Tarzan film in color
TV film	Tarzan and the Trappers	Gordon Scott	Sol Lesser	Charles F. Haas; Sandy Howard	1958	WB: The Tarzan Collection Starring Gordon Scott	A black and white pilot film, re-edited from three unaired TV episodes and issued to theaters. The re-edited version was finally aired on TV in 1966.
Metro-Goldwyn-Mayer	Tarzan's Fight for Life	Gordon Scott	Sol Lesser	H. Bruce Humberstone	1958	WB: The Tarzan Collection Starring Gordon Scott	in color, as would be all subsequent Tarzan films; last Tarzan film produced by Sol Lesser the last in the franchise to follow the Weissmuller formula of a pidgin-speaking Tarzan living in a treehouse with Jane. Final appearance of the Jane character in the mainstream Tarzan film franchise until 1981.
Paramount Pictures	Tarzan's Greatest Adventure	Gordon Scott	Sy Weintraub; Harvey Hayutin	John Guillermin	1959	WB: The Tarzan Collection Starring Gordon Scott	first of the Sy Weintraub productions, revamping the character as an educated lone adventurer
Paramount Pictures	Tarzan the Magnificent	Gordon Scott	Sy Weintraub; Harvey Hayutin	Robert Day	1960	WB: The Tarzan Collection Starring Gordon Scott	Not based on the Burroughs novel of the same name Last film to star Gordon Scott
Metro-Goldwyn-Mayer	Tarzan Goes to India	Jock Mahoney	Sy Weintraub	John Guillermin	1962	WB: The Tarzan Collection Starring Jock Mahoney & Mike Henry	First film to star Jock Mahoney
Metro-Goldwyn-Mayer	Tarzan's Three Challenges	Jock Mahoney	Sy Weintraub	Robert Day	1963	WB: The Tarzan Collection Starring Jock Mahoney & Mike Henry	Last film to star Jock Mahoney
American International Pictures	Tarzan and the Valley of Gold	Mike Henry	Sy Weintraub	Robert Day	1966	WB: The Tarzan Collection Starring Jock Mahoney & Mike Henry	First film to star Mike Henry
Paramount Pictures	Tarzan and the Great River	Mike Henry	Sy Weintraub; Steve Shagan	Robert Day	1967	WB: The Tarzan Collection Starring Jock Mahoney & Mike Henry	
Paramount Pictures	Tarzan and the Jungle Boy	Mike Henry	Sy Weintraub; Robert Day	Robert Gordon	1968	WB: The Tarzan Collection Starring Jock Mahoney & Mike Henry	Last film to place Tarzan in the present day
Metro-Goldwyn-Mayer	Tarzan the Ape Man	Miles O'Keeffe	Bo Derek	John Derek	1981		First and only film to star Miles O'Keeffe; First appearance of Jane since Tarzan's Fight for Life in 1958 and last time her surname is "Parker" instead of "Porter"; Last appearance of Cheeta; First film to treat Tarzan as a 1910s period piece, which becomes the norm afterwards
Warner Bros	Greystoke: The Legend of Tarzan, Lord of the Apes	Christopher Lambert	Hugh Hudson; Stanley S. Canter	Hugh Hudson	1984		First and only film to star Christopher Lambert
Warner Bros	Tarzan and the Lost City	Casper Van Dien	Stanley S. Canter; Dieter Geissler; Michael Lake	Carl Schenkel	1998		First and only film to star Casper Van Dien
Warner Bros	The Legend of Tarzan	Alexander Skarsgård	Jerry Weintraub; David Barron; Alan Riche; Tony Ludwig	David Yates	2016		First and only film to star Alexander Skarsgård

==== Serials and remakes ====
Studio	Film title	Starring	Produced by	Directed by	Theatrical release	DVD release	Notes
Principal Distributing Corporation	Tarzan the Fearless	Buster Crabbe	Sol Lesser	Robert F. Hill	1933		Also released as edited feature film of same name.
Burroughs-Tarzan Enterprises Inc.	The New Adventures of Tarzan	Herman Brix	Edgar Rice Burroughs; Ashton Dearholt; George W. Stout	Edward Kull; Wilbur F. McGaugh	1935	The Film Detective: The Tarzan Vault Collection	Also released as edited two feature films, first The New Adventures of Tarzan (1935) of same name and second feature film version titled Tarzan and the Green Goddess (1938)
Twentieth Century Fox	Tarzan’s Revenge	Glenn Morris	Sol Lesser	D. Ross Lederman	1938		Produced by Sol Lesser, after he argued that he still had binding contract to produce at least five Tarzan films, Lesser would later move on to take over the Weissmuller series.
Metro-Goldwyn-Mayer	Tarzan, the Ape Man	Denny Miller	Al Zimbalist	Joseph M. Newman	1959		Remake of the 1932 film of same name, starring Johnny Weissmuller

==== Animated films ====
Studio	Film title	Voiced by	Produced by	Directed by	Theatrical release	DVD release	Notes
Sony Wonder	Tarzan of the Apes	Unknown	Diane Eskenazi; Darcy Wright	Unknown	1999		Direct to video animated feature
Walt Disney Feature Animation	Tarzan	Tony Goldwyn	Bonnie Arnold	Kevin Lima; Chris Buck	1999		Theatrical Animated Feature Film.
Walt Disney Television Animation	Tarzan & Jane	Michael T. Weiss	Steve Loter	Victor Cook; Steve Loter	2002		Direct to video animated feature, edited from three episodes of the Disney's animated TV series The Legend of Tarzan
Disneytoon Studios	Tarzan II	Harrison Chad	Carolyn Bates; Jim Kammerud; Leslie Hough<	Brian Smith	2005		Direct to video animated feature.
Summit Entertainment	Tarzan	Kellan Lutz	Reinhard Klooss; Robert Kulzer	Reinhard Klooss	2013		CGI/Motion Capture German film.

=== Television ===
Tarzan originated in a series of novels, from which a large number of serial films were derived. Television later emerged as a primary vehicle bringing the character to the public. From the mid-1950s, all the extant sound Tarzan films became staples of Saturday morning television aimed at young and teenaged viewers. In 1958, movie Tarzan Gordon Scott filmed three episodes for a prospective television series. The program did not sell, but a number of later series were produced.

Title	Aired	Episodes	Broadcaster	Type	Tarzan actor	Jane actress	Notes
Tarzan	1966–68	57	NBC	TV series	Ron Ely	None.	Produced by Sy Weintraub. Tarzan's Jungle Rebellion (1967) (two-part season 2 episode "The Blue Stone of Heaven" from the NBC TV series, also released to theaters); Tarzan's Deadly Silence (1970) (two-part season 1 TV series episode "The Deadly Silence," also released to theaters)
Tarzan, Lord of the Jungle	1976–80	36	CBS	Animated TV series	Robert Ridgely	Linda Gary (guest only, in episode 30)	Produced by Filmation; episodes later incorporated into the Batman/Tarzan Adventure Hour (1977–78), Tarzan and the Super 7 (1978–80), The Tarzan/Lone Ranger Adventure Hour (1980–81), and The Tarzan/Lone Ranger/Zorro Adventure Hour) (1981–82).
Tarzan in Manhattan	1989-04-15	1	CBS	TV movie	Joe Lara	Kim Crosby	
Io Jane, tu Tarzan	1989	4	RAI	TV miniseries	Sebastiano Somma	Carmen Russo	
Tarzán	1991–94	75	TF1, syndication (U.S.)	TV series	Wolf Larson	Lydie Denier	In this version, Tarzan is a blond environmentalist, and Jane is a French ecologist.
Tarzan: The Epic Adventures	1996–97	22	Syndication (U.S.)	TV series	Joe Lara	None	Tarzan's Return – two part TV pilot.
The Legend of Tarzan	2001–02	39	UPN	Animated TV series	Michael T. Weiss	Olivia d'Abo	Produced by Disney as a spin-off from its animated film.
Tarzan	2003	8	The WB	TV series	Travis Fimmel	Sarah Wayne Callies	This version is set in contemporary New York City, with Jane as a police detective. Cancelled after eight episodes.
Tarzan and Jane	2017	13	Netflix	TV series	Giles Panton	Rebecca Shoichet	

=== Documentaries ===
- Tarzan: The Legacy of Edgar Rice Burroughs (1996)
- Tarzan at the Movies, Part 1: Johnny Weissmuller (1996)
- Tarzan at the Movies, Part 2: The Many Faces of Tarzan (1996)
- Investigating Tarzan (1997)
- The One, the Only, the Real Tarzan (2004)
- Tarzan: Silver Screen King of the Jungle (2004)
- I, Tarzan (1996)
- Hollywood and Vine (TCM Short)

== Unauthorized films ==
- Tarzan versus the Leopard Men (1964) (Ralph Hudson)
- Tarzan and the Hidden Treasure (1965) (Anthony Freeman)
- Tarzan in the Golden Grotto (1969) (Steve Hawkes)
- Tarzan and the Brown Prince (1972) (Steve Hawkes)
- Tarzán y el misterio de la selva (1973) (Richard Yesteran)
- Tarzán en las minas del rey Salomón (1973) (David Carpenter)
- Tarzan and the Kawana Treasure (1975) (Richard Yesteran)
- Tarzan Sundari (1983) (Silk Smitha)
- Adventures of Tarzan (1985) (Hemant Birje)
- Tarzan X (1994) (Joe D'Amato)
- Tarzan Ki Beti (2002) (Hemant Birje)

== Actors who have portrayed Tarzan ==
=== On film (adult) ===
- Elmo Lincoln 1918, 1918, 1921 (all silent)
- Gene Pollar 1920 (silent)
- P. Dempsey Tabler 1920 (silent)
- James Pierce 1927 (silent)
- Frank Merrill 1928, 1929 (all silent)
- Johnny Weissmuller 1932, 1934, 1936, 1939, 1941, 1942, 1943, 1943, 1945, 1946, 1947, 1948
- Buster Crabbe 1933
- Herman Brix later billed as Bruce Bennett 1935, 1938
- Glenn Morris 1938
- Lex Barker 1949, 1950, 1951, 1952, 1953
- Gordon Scott 1955, 1957, 1958, 1959, 1960
- Denny Miller 1959
- Jock Mahoney 1962, 1963
- Mike Henry 1966, 1967, 1968
- Ron Ely 1966, 1967, 1968, 1970
- Miles O'Keeffe 1981
- Christopher Lambert 1984
- Casper Van Dien 1998
- Tony Goldwyn 1999 (voice of animated Tarzan)
- Kellan Lutz 2013 (performance capture)
- Alexander Skarsgård 2016

=== On film (youth) ===
- Gordon Griffith (1918, 1918)
- Tali McGregor (1984)
- Peter Kyriakous (1984)
- Danny Potts (1984)
- Eric Langlois (1984)
- Alex D. Linz 1999 (voice of young animated Tarzan)
- Harrison Chad (2005)
- Craig Garner (2013) (performance capture of 4-year-old CGI/Motion Capture Tarzan film)
- Anton Zetterholm (2013) (voice of teen CGI/Motion Capture Tarzan film)
- Rory J. Saper (2016)
- Christian Stevens (2016)

=== On stage ===
- Ronald Adair 1921 (Broadway)
- Josh Strickland 2006 (Original Broadway Cast – New York, NY)
- Daniel Manche (Tarzan as a youth) 2006 (Original Broadway Cast – New York, NY)
- Alex Rutherford (Tarzan as a youth) 2006 (Original Broadway Cast – New York, NY)
- Dylan Riley Snyder (Tarzan as a youth) 2006 (Original Broadway Cast – New York, NY)
- Anton Zetterholm 2008 (Original German Cast – Hamburg)

=== On radio ===
- James Pierce 1932–1934
- Carlton KaDell 1934–1936
- Lamont Johnson 1951–1953

=== On television ===
- Gordon Scott filmed 1958, aired 1966
- Ron Ely 1966–1968
- Robert Ridgely 1976–1982 (voice, Filmation series)
- Joe Lara 1989, 1996
- Wolf Larson 1991–1994
- Michael T. Weiss 2001 (voice, Disney series)
- Travis Fimmel 2003

=== In video games ===
- Tony Goldwyn, Kingdom Hearts, 2002
- Jūrōta Kosugi, Kingdom Hearts, Japanese

== See also ==
- Carry on up the Jungle (1970) Tarzan parody
