= Tarzan's Deadly Silence =

- Directed by: Robert L. Friend
- Written by: Lee Erwin; Jack H. Robinson; John Considine; Tim Considine
- Based on: Characters created by Edgar Rice Burroughs
- Produced by: Sy Weintraub; Leon Benson
- Starring: Ron Ely; Jock Mahoney; Woody Strode; Manuel Padilla, Jr.
- Music by: Walter Greene
- Distributed by: National General Pictures
- Release date: April 22, 1970 (St. Louis)
- Running time: 88 minutes
- Language: English

Tarzan's Deadly Silence is a 1970 adventure film composed of an edited two-part television episode of Tarzan released as a feature. It stars Ron Ely as Tarzan. Former Tarzan actor Jock Mahoney and Woody Strode (a veteran of two previous Tarzan films) co-star. The film was produced by Sy Weintraub and Leon Benson, written by Lee Erwin, Jack H. Robinson, John Considine, and Tim Considine (based on the character created by Edgar Rice Burroughs) and directed by Robert L. Friend.

== Premise ==
Tarzan loses his hearing after a bomb blast, and is hunted through the jungle by the ruthless Colonel.

== Cast ==
- Ron Ely as Tarzan
- Jock Mahoney as The Colonel, a villain
- Woody Strode as Marshak
- Manuel Padilla, Jr. as Jai, Tarzan's youthful ward
- Nichelle Nichols as Ruana

== Production notes ==
The film consists of The Deadly Silence, a two-part episode of Ely's NBC Television Tarzan series.

- The Deadly Silence, Part I, aired on October 28, 1966. It was written by Lee Erwin and Jack H. Robinson, and directed by Robert L. Friend.
- The Deadly Silence, Part II, aired on November 4, 1966. It was written by John Considine and Tim Considine, and directed by Lawrence Dobkin, who was not credited in the theatrical release of the film.

Jock Mahoney's first appearance in Tarzan films was as Coy Banton, a villain opposite Gordon Scott's Tarzan in the 1960 film Tarzan the Magnificent. He took over the role of the Ape Man in 1962's Tarzan Goes to India. This was followed by his final turn as Tarzan in Tarzan's Three Challenges (1963).

Woody Strode portrayed Ramo in Tarzan's Fight for Life (1958), and Khan in Tarzan's Three Challenges (1963).

== Release ==
The film opened April 22, 1970 at Loew's Mid-City Theatre in St. Louis and grossed $4,500 in its week there in a double bill with Day of Anger.
