= Tarzan's Greatest Adventure =

1959 film by John Guillermin

- Directed by: John Guillermin
- Screenplay by: Bernie Giler; John Guillermin
- Story by: Les Crutchfield
- Based on: Characters created by Edgar Rice Burroughs
- Produced by: Sy Weintraub; Harvey Hayutin
- Starring: Gordon Scott; Anthony Quayle; Sara Shane; Niall MacGinnis; Sean Connery; Al Mulock; Scilla Gabel
- Cinematography: Ted Scaife
- Edited by: Bert Rule
- Music by: Douglas Gamley
- Production company: Solar Films
- Distributed by: Paramount Pictures
- Release date: July 8, 1959 (New York City)
- Running time: 88 minutes
- Country: United States
- Language: English
- Budget: $750,000
- Box office: $1 million (est. US/Canada rentals)

Tarzan's Greatest Adventure is a 1959 American Eastmancolor adventure film directed by John Guillermin, produced by Sy Weintraub and Harvey Hayutin, and written by Les Crutchfield, based on the character created by Edgar Rice Burroughs as the twenty-second film of the Tarzan film series that began with 1932's Tarzan the Ape Man. With a strong supporting cast that included Anthony Quayle and Sean Connery, and a focus on action and suspense, the film won critical praise as a Tarzan film that appealed to adults as well as children.

The film features a literate Tarzan portrayed by Gordon Scott. The character of Jane Porter, Tarzan's wife, does not appear and is not mentioned. At one point, Tarzan briefly romances a female character Angie Loring, suggesting that he is a loner, not a family man. Cheeta, Tarzan's chimp companion in many films, appears only a few times near the start of the film, and the kind of comic relief that Cheeta represents is generally absent from the film. Released on July 8, 1959, was followed by Tarzan the Magnificent in 1960.

== Plot ==
Disguised as natives, the mercenaries Slade, O'Bannion, Kreiger and Dino have been murderously raiding African villages for supplies. At Mantu, the radio operator recognizes Slade, who shoots him before fleeing in a canoe with the others and the dynamite they have stolen from the village. Before dying, the villager makes a brief radio transmission which is heard by a bush pilot flying nearby.

Talking drums summon Tarzan to the village and he finds evidence that the raiders were in disguise. From the bush pilot, Angie Loring, who has landed there because of fuel trouble, Tarzan learns that his old enemy Slade was identified by the dying radio operator, and he sets out in pursuit, canoeing upriver. The next morning, Angie has just flown past Tarzan when her plane crashes in the river. She is unscathed and swims to shore while a crocodile in her wake is intercepted by Tarzan. He and his canoe are her only way out, so she joins him on his manhunt.

The mercenaries, along with Slade's girlfriend Toni, are heading upriver in Dino's cabin cruiser, making slow progress partly because they cannot navigate at night. The stolen dynamite is for re-opening a cave which Slade blasted shut after locating rough diamonds inside. The men are going to mine there, and though they dislike each other and bicker, they are united in wanting to become rich.

Slade knows from the talking drums that Tarzan is coming, and the following morning he and O'Bannion, armed with rifles, walk downstream along the riverbank to set up an ambush. Tarzan has also taken to land and comes under fire until his skill with bow and arrow forces Slade and O'Bannion to retreat back to their boat. No one is injured but because Slade unmoored their canoe, Tarzan and Angie now have to travel on foot through the jungle. This becomes an advantage when the river course meanders and they can cut through the jungle and get ahead of the boat.

The next day, having tied off to make repairs, Dino becomes furious with O'Bannion, chases him into the jungle and dies in quicksand after suffering a leopard attack. The remaining bandits are underway until Tarzan blocks their boat with fallen trees and pins them down under a barrage of arrows. They fight back with dynamite and injure Tarzan, who still manages to kill O'Bannion. While Slade is on land hunting for Tarzan, Kreiger breaks the logjam with dynamite. Slade rushes back to the boat because it seems that Kreiger is about to leave without him, which Kreiger denies. They continue on to the base of the falls at river's source.

Angie tends to Tarzan's wounds, and he is unconscious when she goes to find the boat to steal penicillin from the medical supplies. Slade catches her, and hoping to use her to lure Tarzan, he digs a trapping pit. Early the next morning while Slade is lying in wait, Kreiger tells Angie he has nothing against Tarzan and wants her to warn him of the trap. Toni overhears this treachery and as she runs to tell Slade, she is chased by a lion. Slade shoots it, and in the confusion Toni falls into the trap and dies. Slade accepts Kreiger's explanation that Angie escaped while he slept.

Slade blasts open the cave and Kreiger, a geologist, is angry to learn that it has already been mined. However, after examining where it was last worked, he estimates that in just a few weeks they can be rich. Slade is no longer interested in the diamonds—for him the thrill was in the adventure of getting back to the cave. Now he is obsessed with killing Tarzan. Kreiger is frustrated with this attitude, and even though it is agreed that any diamonds he finds will be his alone, he wants to be rid of his partner. He shoves Slade into a deep shaft, but Slade climbs out and kills him.

Tarzan recovers and sends Angie downriver to safety in Dino's boat. A climactic confrontation between the two adversaries on a river bluff ends with Slade dead and Tarzan triumphant.

== Cast ==
- Gordon Scott as Tarzan
- Anthony Quayle as Slade
- Sara Shane as Angie Loring
- Sean Connery as O'Bannion
- Niall MacGinnis as Kreiger
- Al Mulock as Dino
- Scilla Gabel as Toni

== Production ==
The Tarzan films had been produced by Sol Lesser since Tarzan Triumphs (1943). In April 1958, Lesser sold his company, including the rights to the Tarzan films, to Sy Weintraub for a reported $3.5 million. Gordon Scott had played Tarzan for the four previous films in the series under Lesser: Tarzan's Hidden Jungle (1955), Tarzan and the Lost Safari (1957), Tarzan and the Trappers (1958), and Tarzan's Fight for Life (1958). In July 1958, he announced he would not return as Tarzan, refusing to sign an exclusive contract. Weintraub said he would find a new Tarzan.

In September 1958, Weintraub announced he had signed a two-picture deal with Paramount Pictures to make two Tarzan films. The films would be shot on location and the first one would be called Tarzan's World Adventure. They were still looking for an actor to replace Scott. In October, the producers announced Theodore B. Sillis had signed to direct. In November, Hedda Hopper reported that Weintraub, unable to find a new Tarzan, had signed a seven-year deal with Scott to play the role.

The producer decided to make a different style of film. Tarzan's Greatest Adventure would present a grittier, more realistic Tarzan. A loner who could be as savage as his opponents, but could also speak eloquently and politely to allies. Tarzan would also be made vulnerable and not as invincible as previous incarnations. "Tarzan has grown up," said Scott in 1959. "I speak clearly understandable, everyday English." He also said "Lesser saw Tarzan as part of a family unit, but if you read Burroughs' books, the bastard [Greystoke] really knew what to do. I always wanted to play it with some scars on me; he used to battle the bull apes, you know, and get a couple of lumps. I wanted to pursue that, but they wouldn't buy it. It may seem like a minor thing, but those minor things really add up." This vision of Tarzan heralded a new direction for the character and the series. He became more like the original Edgar Rice Burroughs creation (that is, articulate and intuitive) and even occasionally traveled abroad to make other wilderness regions safe—as in Tarzan Goes to India (1962) and Tarzan and the Valley of Gold (1966).

Filming started 9 February 1959. The film was shot on location in Kenya and at Shepperton Studios in London. Stock safari footage was used to portray wildlife, especially animal attacks. Paramount did a deal with Sol Lesser Productions with a guarantee of $600,000 in turn for the releasing rights; the deal also gave Paramount 50% of the ownership of the negative. The film cost $750,000. Paramount agreed to pay for prints and advertising.

John Guillermin later said "For a short schedule, fairly low-budget picture, the whole affair really got me quite excited." Scott said Sean Connery "was marvelous... He and I had some good giggles, when we got back to Shepperton. They wanted to use him in the next Tarzan, even though he gets killed in this one because he was very good. He said OK. but he had to do this thing for [producers Albert] Broccoli and [Harry] Saltzman — and that was Dr. No. We couldn't touch him after that."

While the film was being made, MGM made their own Tarzan film, Tarzan, the Ape Man (1959). They were able to do this because they retained remake rights for the 1932 film of the same name.

== Reception ==
According to Kinematograph Weekly the film performed "better than average" at the British box office in 1959.

FilmInk called it "a masterpiece in the series, the best Tarzan film since Tarzan and His Mate (1934), and perhaps the most remarkable “turnaround of a franchise” in Hollywood history... the leap in quality after what had been over a decade of steady decline is remarkable."

Gordon Scott stayed for one more Tarzan film, Tarzan the Magnificent (1960), before being replaced by Jock Mahoney in Tarzan Goes to India (1962) which was also directed by Guillermin.

== Notes ==
- Essoe, Gabe, Tarzan of the Movies, 1968, The Citadel Press
- Fury, David, Kings of the jungle : an illustrated reference to "Tarzan" on screen and television, 1994, McFarland & Co.
