= Tarzan and the Jungle Boy =

1968 film by Robert Gordon

- Directed by: Robert Gordon
- Written by: Stephen Lord
- Based on: Characters created by Edgar Rice Burroughs
- Produced by: Sy Weintraub; Robert Day
- Starring: Mike Henry; Rafer Johnson; Aliza Gur; Steve Bond; Ed Johnson; Ron Gans
- Cinematography: Ozen Sermet
- Edited by: Milton Mann; Reg Browne
- Music by: William Loose
- Production company: Banner Productions
- Distributed by: Paramount Pictures
- Release date: May 1, 1968
- Running time: 90 minutes
- Country: United States
- Language: English

Tarzan and the Jungle Boy is a 1968 adventure film starring Mike Henry in his third and final appearance as Tarzan. Rafer Johnson and Aliza Gur co-star. The film was produced by Sy Weintraub and Robert Day, written by Stephen Lord (based on the character created by Edgar Rice Burroughs) and directed by Robert Gordon. Released on May 1, 1968, it is the twenty-eighth and final film in the Tarzan film series that began with 1932's Tarzan the Ape Man, and was followed by a self-titled remake film in 1981.

== Plot ==
At home in Africa, Tarzan (Mike Henry) assists a photojournalist named Myrna (Aliza Gur) and her associate Ken (Ron Gans) in their search for Erik Brunik (Steve Bond), a thirteen-year-old boy lost in the jungle since he was seven years old. Tarzan is assisted by his friend Buhara (Ed Johnson) whose brother Nagambi (Rafer Johnson) does not wish the boy found, and attempts to kill him before Tarzan saves the day.

== Cast ==
- Mike Henry as Tarzan
- Rafer Johnson as Nagambi, villain who hinders Tarzan's search for the Jungle Boy
- Aliza Gur as Myrna, photojournalist searching for Erik
- Steve Bond as Erik Brunik, the missing Jungle Boy
- Ron Gans as Ken, Myrna's associate
- Ed Johnson as Buhara, ally to Tarzan, brother of Nagambi

== Production notes ==
Tarzan and the Jungle Boy was filmed in Brazil and along the Amazon River immediately after production of the previous film, Tarzan and the Great River.

All three of Mike Henry's Tarzan films were completed before the first (Tarzan and the Valley of Gold) was released in 1966.

The roles of opposing brothers Nagambi and Buhara were played by real life brothers Rafer and Ed Johnson.

Mike Henry was attacked and his jaw bitten by the chimpanzee playing Cheeta during filming (named Dinky in the previous production, Tarzan and the Great River) and sued Sy Weintraub's Banner Productions. Citing exhaustion and unsafe work conditions in the suit, he bowed out of the Tarzan television series (for which he had been signed to play the lead). The case was settled for an undisclosed sum. Ron Ely replaced him as Tarzan in the TV series.

If one does not count two later theatrical releases of episodes from the Ron Ely TV series, this film was the final release in the "mainstream" Tarzan film franchise that had begun in 1918. The next official made-for-theatrical release production featuring the character would be Tarzan, the Ape Man, an attempted reboot of the concept, in 1981.

== Critical response ==
A contemporary review of the film in Variety noted that the "[d]irection by Robert Gordon is only as good as the screenplay, which doesn’t give him much latitude, but color photography by Ozen Sermet is outstanding," that "Mike Henry ... is okay in part but isn’t called upon to do much fraternizing with wild animals" and "the production lacks the finish of early Tarzan mellers but ... [it] unspools along regulation lines for a fairly fast windup." Writing in DVD Talk, critic John Sinnott described the film as "a lot like an old Johnny Weissmuller-era film [with] a lot that works," but noted that the "only problem is that it doesn't work quite as well as it should. There are a few storylines that are all competing for screen time, which means that Tarzan doesn't play a [sic] big of a role as he should."
