= William Loose =

American composer

- Birth name: William George Loose
- Also known as: Bill Loose
- Born: June 5, 1910 Michigan, U.S.
- Died: February 22, 1991 (aged 80) Burbank, California, U.S.
- Occupations: Film and television composer

William George Loose (June 5, 1910 – February 22, 1991) was an American composer of film, cartoon and television soundtrack music and stock musical cues.

== Early life and career ==
Born in Michigan, Loose became a staff musical arranger for an Omaha, Nebraska radio station. During World War II, he led the United States Army Air Forces Orchestra in New York.

In the 1950s, Capitol Records represented several musical libraries. Capitol decided to assemble its own library in 1955, and when Nelson Riddle turned down the job of a composer of their musical cues, they hired Loose and John Seely. By 1957, Loose's music was played on no less than 24 different television shows a week; and as of the 1960s, some cues of his music were later used in theaters and drive-in theaters. Film companies such as National Screen Service and Filmack Studios later placed some of William's cues onto its soundtrack under its snipe works beginning in 1964. Loose's accomplishments led to invitations to compose scores for American television series such as The Sheriff of Cochise and The Texan. Loose also was in demand as an arranger for various artists on Decca Records and Reprise Records. In 1968–69, Loose was music director for The Doris Day Show.

For several decades starting in the 1950s, Loose's composed music for films and television, including such diverse works as the themes to television series Trackdown (1957-1959) and Wanted: Dead or Alive (1959-1961), the 1966–1981 game show The Hollywood Squares (1969-1979 version of theme music), and films Tarzan and the Great River (1967) and Tarzan and the Jungle Boy (1968) starring Mike Henry, many short pieces for NFL Films, and music for Russ Meyer movies including Cherry, Harry & Raquel! (1970), Black Snake (1973), Supervixens (1975) and Up! (1976). Some of his stock cues were also used in George A. Romero's original Night of the Living Dead in 1968. He also scored many cult 1970s films such as The Rebel Rousers (1970), The Big Bird Cage (1972), The Wrestler (1974), The Swinging Cheerleaders (1974), Devil Times Five (1974), The Grizzly and the Treasure (1975) and Mako: The Jaws of Death (1976). His later scores included The Man Who Saw Tomorrow (1981) and Mystery Mansion (1983).

== Death and legacy ==
Loose died of a heart attack at the age of 80.

The reuse of Loose's cues for the 1990s cartoon series The Ren & Stimpy Show brought him a new generation of fans.

A tribute to Loose was given in a The William Loose Songbook a double CD by Richard Peterson.

A music company Loose had founded with Billy May called "May-Loo Music" was left to Loose's wife Irma after his death. She was awarded a $1.9 million jury award when a business manager mismanaged her firm.
