= Tarzan the Ape Man (1932 film) =

1932 film

- Theatrical release poster
- Directed by: W. S. Van Dyke
- Written by: Cyril Hume
- Based on: Tarzan of the Apes by Edgar Rice Burroughs
- Produced by: Irving Thalberg
- Starring: Johnny Weissmuller; Neil Hamilton; Maureen O'Sullivan; C. Aubrey Smith
- Cinematography: Clyde De Vinna
- Edited by: Tom Held; Ben Lewis
- Production company: Metro-Goldwyn-Mayer
- Distributed by: Loew's Inc.
- Release dates: March 22, 1932 (New York City, premiere); April 2, 1932 (US)
- Running time: 99 minutes
- Country: United States
- Language: English
- Budget: $652,675
- Box office: $2.54 million

Tarzan the Ape Man is a 1932 pre-Code American action adventure film produced by Metro-Goldwyn-Mayer featuring Edgar Rice Burroughs' Tarzan and starring Johnny Weissmuller, Neil Hamilton, C. Aubrey Smith and Maureen O'Sullivan. It was Weissmuller's first of 12 Tarzan films. O'Sullivan played Jane in six features between 1932 and 1942. The film is loosely based on Burroughs' 1912 novel Tarzan of the Apes, with the dialogue written by Ivor Novello. The film was directed by W.S. Van Dyke. Metro-Goldwyn-Mayer released two remakes of Tarzan, the Ape Man in 1959 and in 1981, but each was a different adaptation of Rice Burroughs' novel. It is also the first appearance of Tarzan's famous yell. As a published work from 1932, the film will enter the American public domain on January 1, 2028.

== Plot ==
James Parker and Harry Holt travel in Africa on a quest for the legendary elephant burial grounds and their ivory. They are joined by Parker's daughter Jane. Holt is attracted to Jane, and tries somewhat ineffectively to protect her from the jungle's dangers. The expedition encounters an attack by both hippopotami and crocodiles. The mysterious Tarzan wards off the attack, but abducts Jane.

The experience is terrifying to Jane at first, but as their relationship develops, she finds herself happy; "not a bit afraid, not a bit sorry". As she returns to her father, her feelings are brought to a test. She wants Tarzan to come with her to London, and to be part of her world. But Tarzan turns his back on her and returns to the jungle. Her father tells her that is where Tarzan belongs; she cries, "not now, he belongs to me."

The expedition is captured by a tribe of aggressive dwarfs. Jane sends Tarzan's chimpanzee friend Cheeta (Jiggs) for help, bringing Tarzan to their rescue. During the rescue, Tarzan summons elephants and they escape from the dwarfs' stronghold, although Jane's father dies from wounds just as they reach the elephant graveyard. Jane decides to stay in the jungle with Tarzan and in the final scene, to the music of Tchaikovsky's Romeo and Juliet, the happy couple appear on a rock, Jane holding Cheeta like a baby.

== Cast ==
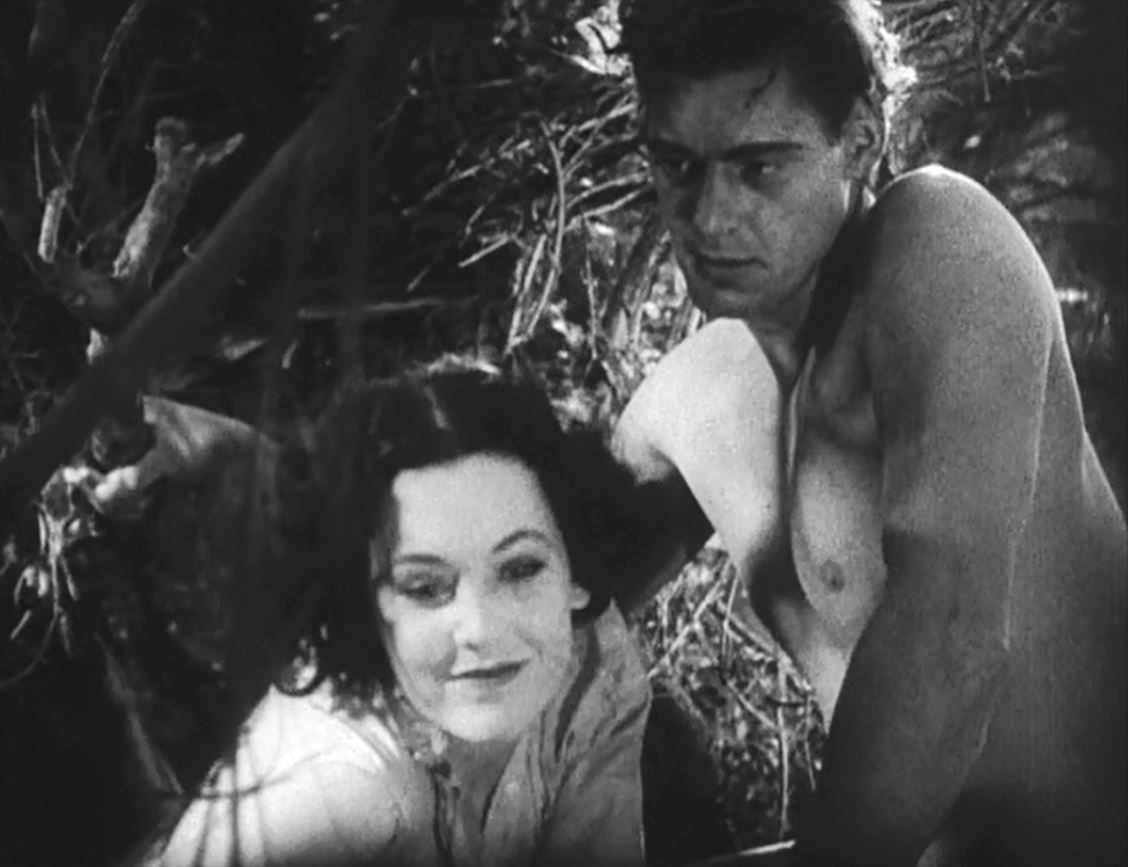
O'Sullivan and Weissmuller

- Johnny Weissmuller as Tarzan
- Maureen O'Sullivan as Jane Parker
- Neil Hamilton as Harry Holt
- C. Aubrey Smith as James Parker
- Doris Lloyd as Mrs Cutten
- Forrester Harvey as Beamish
- Ivory Williams as Riano
- Ray Corrigan as Ape
- Johnny Eck as Bird Creature
- Angelo Rossitto as Evil Dwarf (uncredited)

== Production ==
MGM finally found who they were looking for when they came across decorated Olympian Weissmuller. The professional swimmer had five gold medals in the 1924 and 1928 Olympics, alongside 67 world and 52 national titles. The only obstacle with signing him onto the role was his contract to model BVD underwear. In order for them to release him from the contract, MGM agreed to have actresses such as Greta Garbo and Marie Dressler, to be featured in BVD ads.

The film was shot on Lot One of the Metro-Goldwyn-Mayer studios in Culver City, California and at the Lake Sherwood area north of Los Angeles as well as Silver Springs in Florida. Lions from the film were borrowed from nearby Goebel's Lion Farm in Thousand Oaks, CA. Goebel himself would often camp by the filming site near Lake Sherwood to watch his lions during filming.

As with most Weissmuller Tarzan films, the elephants were Indian, which have smaller ears, rather than African, so large fake ears, and fake tusks, were fitted onto the animals in an attempt to make them look authentic. Similarly, the tribe of African dwarfs, made to look like pygmies (all males), portrayed in the film was actually a cast of several white midgets wearing blackface.

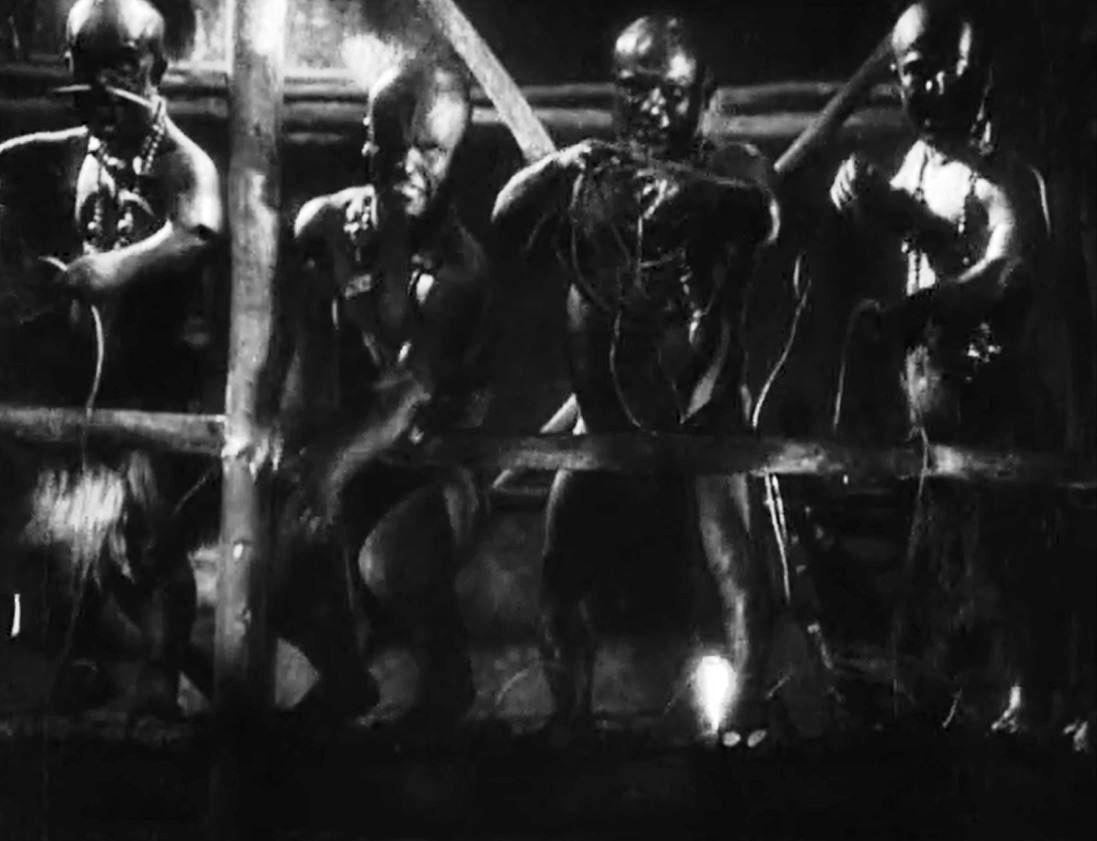
Little people wearing blackface acted as pygmies

Stock footage made in Africa for W.S. Van Dyke's Trader Horn was added to location work shot in the then-undeveloped Toluca Lake region north of Los Angeles.

The film cost $652,675 to produce.

== Release ==
The film was released on April 2, 1932. The movie proved to be a huge hit, pulling in nearly $1 million in profits. The overall success of the film led MGM to star Weissmuller and O'Sullivan in a total of five sequels.

== Critical reception ==
Writing in The New York Times, critic Mordaunt Hall described the film as "cleverly photographed," that "scenes wherein Tarzan swings from tree to tree and takes a high dive into a lake are done most effectively," and noted that "Mr. Weissmuller does good work as Tarzan and Miss O'Sullivan is alert as Jane." A review of the film in Variety described it as a "jungle and stunt picture" that was "loaded with a wealth of sensational wild animal stuff" and "done in deluxe style, with tricky handling of fantastic atmosphere, and a fine, artless performance by [Weissmuller] that represents the absolute best that could be done with the character."

Film review aggregator Rotten Tomatoes reported an approval rating of 88% "Fresh", based on 17 reviews.

== Film series ==
The Tarzan the Ape Man (1932) sequels produced by MGM, starring Johnny Weissmuller and Maureen O'Sullivan, were:

- Tarzan and His Mate (1934)
- Tarzan Escapes (1936)
- Tarzan Finds a Son! (1939)
- Tarzan's Secret Treasure (1941)
- Tarzan's New York Adventure (1942)

The Tarzan sequels produced by RKO, starring Johnny Weissmuller, were:

- Tarzan Triumphs (1943)
- Tarzan's Desert Mystery (1943)
- Tarzan and the Amazons (1945)
- Tarzan and the Leopard Woman (1946)
- Tarzan and the Huntress (1947)
- Tarzan and the Mermaids (1948)

Following the twelve films starring Johnny Weissmuller, MGM and RKO would produce a further 16 Tarzan films set in the same continuity with different actors playing Tarzan, along with two remake films in 1959 (starring Denny Miller as Tarzan) and 1981 (starring Bo Derek as Jane).

- Lex Barker
  - Tarzan's Magic Fountain (1949)
  - Tarzan and the Slave Girl (1950)
  - Tarzan's Peril (1951)
  - Tarzan's Savage Fury (1952)
  - Tarzan and the She-Devil (1953)
- Gordon Scott
  - Tarzan's Hidden Jungle (1955)
  - Tarzan and the Lost Safari (1957)
  - Tarzan's Fight for Life (1958)
  - Tarzan and the Trappers (Filmed in 1958, released in 1960)
  - Tarzan's Greatest Adventure (1959)
  - Tarzan the Magnificent (1960)
- Jock Mahoney
  - Tarzan Goes to India (1962)
  - Tarzan's Three Challenges (1963)
- Mike Henry
  - Tarzan and the Valley of Gold (1966)
  - Tarzan and the Great River (1967)
  - Tarzan and the Jungle Boy (1968)

== Animals in Film ==
- Asiatic lion
- Chimpanzee
- Asian elephant
- Crocodile
- Hippopotamus
- Leopard
