= Harry Holt (Tarzan) =

- First appearance: Tarzan the Ape Man
- Portrayed by: Neil Hamilton; Cesare Danova; John Phillip Law

In-universe information
- Gender: Male

Harry Holt is a recurring character who has appeared in four Tarzan films.

== Character ==
He was an explorer first portrayed by Neil Hamilton in the first of the Tarzan films starring Johnny Weissmuller: Tarzan the Ape Man. In that 1932 film, Holt is co-leader of the expedition with James Parker (originally named Archimedes Porter in "Tarzan of the Apes"), the father of Jane Parker. He is portrayed as a well-meaning but ineffectual person who has a romantic interest in Jane. Hamilton reprised this role in the 1934 sequel Tarzan and His Mate, in which Holt dies during an attack by lions.

The character also appears in the 1959 and 1981 remakes of the 1932 film, played by Cesare Danova and John Phillip Law respectively.

== Corresponding novel character ==
As the initial romantic interest of Jane, Harry can be considered a replacement for Tarzan's paternal cousin, William Cecil Clayton, who was Jane Porter's initial love interest in the novels. However, Harry is neither related to Tarzan nor antagonistic to the ape man as was the case for William.
