= Tarzan (1966 TV series) =

American television series

- Opening title
- Starring: Ron Ely; Manuel Padilla Jr. Alan Caillou; Rockne Tarkington
- Country of origin: United States
- Original language: English
- No. of seasons: 2
- No. of episodes: 57

Production
- Executive producer: Sy Weintraub
- Producers: Jon Epstein; Leon Benson; Steve Shagan; Maurice Unger
- Running time: 60 mins.
- Production company: Banner Productions

Original release
- Network: NBC
- Release: September 8, 1966 – April 5, 1968

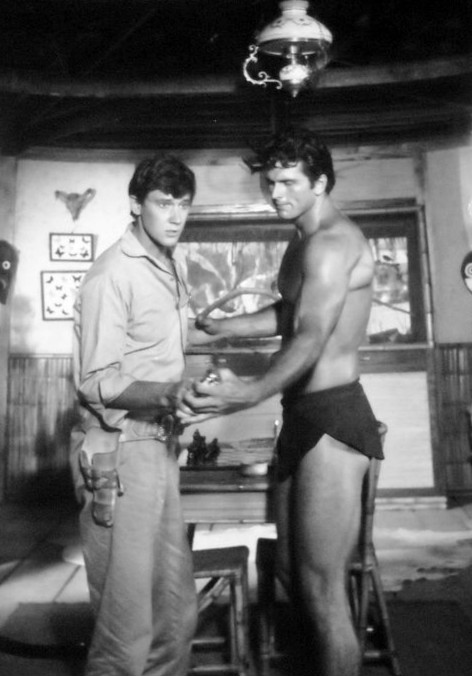
Andrew Prine with Ron Ely as Tarzan in the episode "The Ultimate Weapon" (September 16, 1966)

Tarzan is a series that aired on NBC from 1966 to 1968. The series portrayed Tarzan (played by Ron Ely) as a well-educated character who had grown tired of civilization, and returned to the jungle where he had been raised. The first five episodes (1–4 and 7 in transmission order) were filmed in Brazil; the production then relocated to Mexico. The series was set in a fictional newly independent African nation, and post-colonial issues figured in many plots.

This series retained many of the trappings of the film series, included the "Tarzan yell" and Cheeta, but excluded Jane as part of the "new look" for the fabled apeman that executive producer Sy Weintraub had introduced in previous motion pictures starring Gordon Scott, Jock Mahoney, and Mike Henry. CBS aired repeat episodes of the program during the summer of 1969.

== Cast ==
- Ron Ely as Tarzan
- Manuel Padilla Jr. as Jai
- Alan Caillou as Jason Flood (episodes 1–4, 7)
- Rockne Tarkington as Rao (episodes 1–4, 7)

=== Recurring appearances ===
Maurice Evans guest-starred as retired Brigadier Sir Basil Bertram, hero of the Battle of the Bulge, in four episodes. Julie Harris guest starred as missionary Charity Jones in four episodes. Chips Rafferty appeared as Dutch Jensen in two episodes.

== Episodes ==
=== Season 1 (1966–67) ===
No. overall	No. in season	Title	Directed by	Written by	Original release date
1	1	"Eyes of the Lion"	Charles S. Dubin	George F. Slavin	September 8, 1966
When a beautiful blind girl's seeing eye lion, Sultan, is mistaken for a rogue, Tarzan must prove the beast's innocence. Guest starring Laurie Sibbald as Nara, and Ned Romero as Oringa.
2	2	"The Ultimate Weapon"	Paul Stanley	Don Brinkley, John Hawkins, Ward Hawkins	September 16, 1966
The vengeful son of an ivory poacher swears revenge on Tarzan.
3	3	"Leopard on the Loose"	Paul Stanley	Oliver Crawford	September 23, 1966
A post worker desperate for money abducts Jai's pet leopard.
4	4	"A Life for a Life"	Robert Day	Don Brinkley	September 30, 1966
The Lord of Jungle must race against time when Jai is bitten by a poisonous spider. (In production order "A Life for a Life" was the first episode of the series.)
5	5	"The Prisoner"	George Marshall	Don Brinkley	October 7, 1966
After a police officer is injured by a diamond thief, Tarzan must prevent the officer's tribe from exacting vigilante justice.
6	6	"The Three Faces of Death"	Earl Bellamy	S.J. Loy	October 14, 1966
Tarzan helps out a woman seeking to retain leadership of her tribe.
7	7	"The Prodigal Puma"	Paul Stanley	Robert Sabaroff	October 21, 1966
A big game hunter targets a puma Tarzan has captured.
8	8	"The Deadly Silence: Part 1"	Robert L. Friend	Lee Erwin, Jack H. Robinson	October 28, 1966
The jungle lord tries to stop a bloodthirsty Colonel from taking over an African village with his soldiers of fortune. However, Tarzan has been rendered temporarily deaf by an exploding hand grenade, effectively limiting one of his keen senses, so he must rely on his near-telepathic ability to communicate with a lion.
9	9	"The Deadly Silence: Part 2"	Lawrence Dobkin	John Considine, Tim Considine	November 4, 1966
Rendered deaf by an explosion, the jungle lord still tries to stop a colonel from taking over a village. National General Pictures released this two-parter theatrically in 1970 as Tarzan's Deadly Silence.
10	10	"The Figurehead"	Alan Crosland Jr.	Samuel Roeca, George F. Slavin	November 11, 1966
Tarzan and Jai protect a young prince.
11	11	"Village of Fire"	Hollingsworth Morse	Jack Gross, James Leighton, Michael Stein	November 18, 1966
After Jai is bitten by a leopard, Tarzan must recover a special serum that can save the boy.
12	12	"The Day of the Golden Lion"	Anton Leader	Robert Goodwin	December 2, 1966
Tarzan joins an athletic championship, but an attempt to steal the prize happens.
13	13	"Pearls of Tanga"	R. G. Springsteen	Sid Saltzman	December 9, 1966
A criminal known as the Admiral and his crew poison the waters so they can be the only ones to take pearl oysters.
14	14	"End of the River"	Anton Leader	G. Joshua David	December 16, 1966
Tarzan must save a young girl and battle a criminal. One of the criminal's two minions (Robert J. Wilke) ends up being fatally devoured by a crocodile.
15	15	"The Ultimate Duel"	Robert L. Friend	Cornelius Ballard	December 23, 1966
A scientist (Henry Silva) pits Tarzan against his computer, which can predict Tarzan's every move.
16	16	"The Fire People"	Earl Bellamy	Wells Root	December 30, 1966
Tarzan and Jai must help a chief rescue his superstitious tribe from a volcano that's about to erupt.
17	17	"Track of the Dinosaur"	Lawrence Dobkin	Norman Lessing, Samuel Newman	January 6, 1967
A corrupt government official uses a local legend to his advantage to get people away from a mineral deposit.
18	18	"The Day the Earth Trembled"	Alex Nicol	Carey Wilber	January 13, 1967
Tarzan reluctantly recruits three escaped convicts to help him get a group of children and their caregiver (Susan Oliver) to safety.
19	19	"Captain Jai"	Anton Leader	James Bonnet, James Leighton	January 20, 1967
Jai is held hostage by criminals seeking stolen diamonds.
20	20	"A Pride of Assassins"	Harmon Jones	Samuel Newman, Barry Trivers	January 27, 1967
A smuggler sends assassins after Tarzan and a young woman because they threaten to expose a smuggling scheme.
21	21	"The Golden Runaway"	Lawrence Dobkin	Carey Wilber	February 3, 1967
Tarzan leads a young woman to a red-headed Irishman who may have a clue to her brother's disappearance.
22	22	"Basil of the Bulge"	Alex Nicol	Samuel Newman	February 10, 1967
A native chief and a corrupt government official capture Sir Basil Bertram before he can arrange tribal treaty.
23	23	"Mask of Rona"	James Komack	S.S. Schweitzer	February 17, 1967
Tarzan leads a group on the search for missing artist Rona Swann; a group member uses the safari as a cover for a gun-running operation.
24	24	"To Steal the Rising Sun"	William Witney	Jackson Gillis	February 24, 1967
An exiled chief plots to steal his tribe's priceless ruby. A con man's minion (Henry Beckman) ends up being fatally devoured by a crocodile.
25	25	"Jungle Dragnet"	William Wiard	Arnold Belgard	March 3, 1967
A native revolutionary and a foreign soldier try to prevent a little girl from revealing the location of an oil-rich field.
26	26	"The Perils of Charity Jones: Part 1"	Alex Nicol	Carey Wilber	March 10, 1967
An American midwestern missionary enlists Jai's aid to fulfill her father's final wish and deliver an organ to a primitive tribe, but their boat is disabled.
27	27	"The Perils of Charity Jones: Part 2"	Alex Nicol	Carey Wilber	March 17, 1967
Tarzan rescues Charity and Jai from hostile natives, but then the trio are pursued by another tribe who are after the guns that Jai hid from them.
28	28	"The Circus"	Harmon Jones	Lawrence Dobkin	March 24, 1967
Jai and Dutch encounter a fugitive who makes an attempt to evade a manhunt by joining the circus.
29	29	"The Ultimatum"	Robert L. Friend	James Menzies	March 31, 1967
A female criminal and her goons threaten to destroy a native village unless Tarzan submits to being their prisoner.
30	30	"Algie B for Brave"	Alex Nicol	Samuel Newman	April 7, 1967
Sir Basil Bertram recruits Tarzan and Jai to assist him in order to discover the location of a Communist country's nuclear detection equipment.
31	31	"Man Killer"	James Komack	Carey Wilber	April 14, 1967
Tarzan's search for a murderer is complicated by a village whose natives employ drugs in their ceremonial rituals.

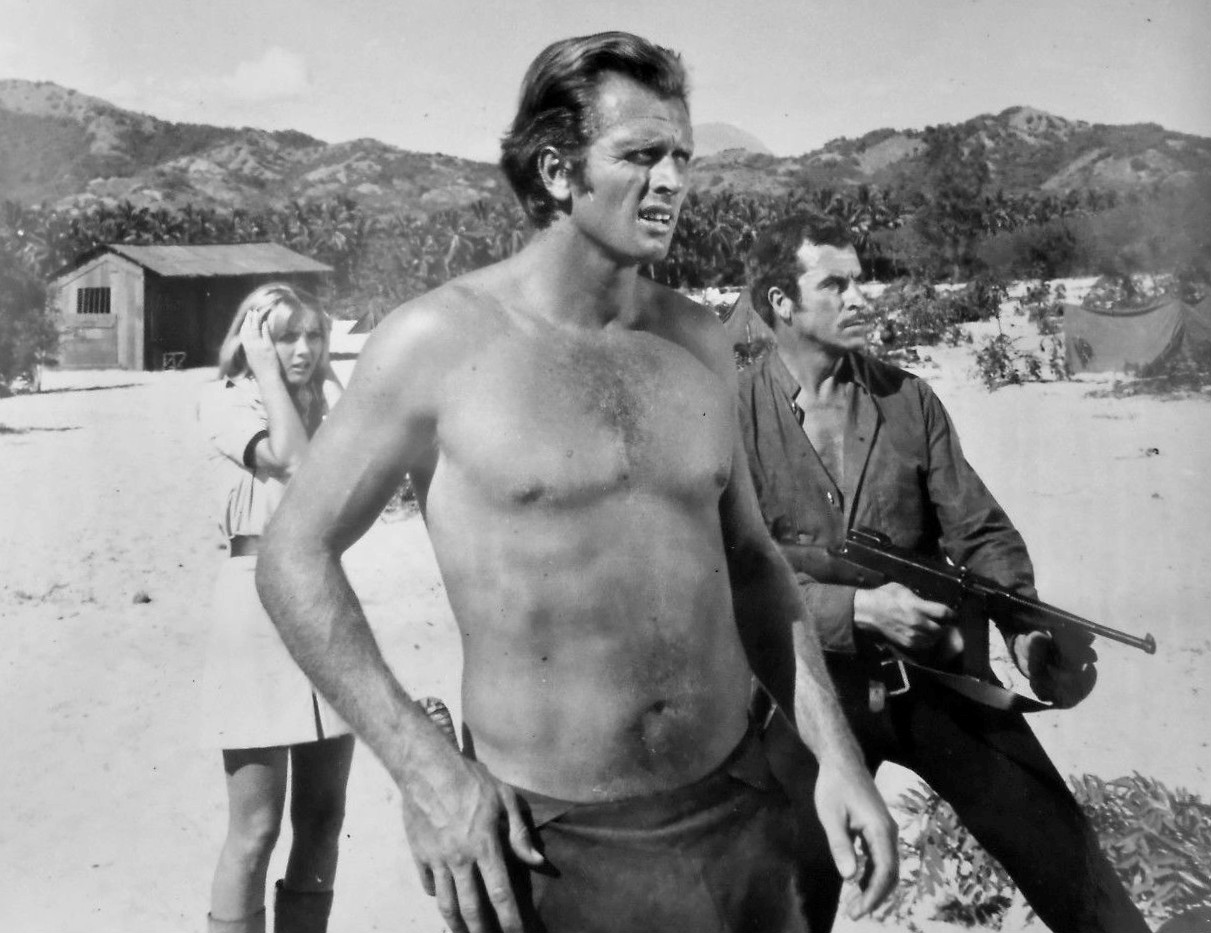
Barbara Bouchet (left) and Fernando Lamas (right) with Ron Ely as Tarzan from the episode "Jungle Ransom" (February 23, 1968)

=== Season 2 (1967–68) ===
No. overall	No. in season	Title	Directed by	Written by	Original release date
32	1	"Tiger, Tiger!"	Harmon Jones	Jackson Gillis	September 15, 1967
An engineer ignores Tarzan's warning about a tiger on the loose.
33	2	"Voice of the Elephant"	Harmon Jones	Terence Maples, Al Martin	September 22, 1967
Jai's pet elephant is blamed for the death of a commissioner.
34	3	"Thief Catcher"	James Komack	Edmund Morris	September 29, 1967
The jungle lord must track and capture two escaped convicts before more people are put in danger.
35	4	"The Blue Stone of Heaven: Part 1"	William Witney	Jackson Gillis	October 6, 1967
The jungle lord leads an archaeological expedition to a burial ground deep in the jungle in defiance of an ancient taboo.
36	5	"The Blue Stone of Heaven: Part 2"	William Witney	Jackson Gillis	October 13, 1967
A power-mad colonel plans to steal the jeweled idol and dynamite the burial ground.
37	6	"The Maguma Curse"	Alex Nicol	Carey Wilber	October 20, 1967
The jungle lord battles to save a young woman from a curse of death implemented by a witch doctor.
38	7	"The Fanatics"	William Witney	Lee Loeb	October 27, 1967
The jungle lord assists a female journalist expose a rigged tribal election.
39	8	"The Last of the Supermen"	Gerald Mayer	S.S. Schweitzer	November 3, 1967
A unrepentant Nazi urges Tarzan to assist him in locating a buried fortune left over from the war.
40	9	"Hotel Hurricane"	Ron Ely	Jackson Gillis	November 10, 1967
A mob makes an attempt to fool Tarzan and Jai into assisting them to recover stolen money after a plane crash.
41	10	"The Pride of the Lioness"	Barry Shear	Jerry Adelman, Gerry Day, William Driskill	November 17, 1967
A young doctor gets help from Tarzan when he faces to forces opposed to his clinic: a witch doctor who has threatened the young man with death, and the young man's socialite mother, who wants him to return home.
42	11	"Mountains of the Moon: Part 1"	Harmon Jones	Jackson Gillis	November 24, 1967
A widow leads a cult of religious pilgrims on a dangerous journey into forbidden land beset by saboteurs as well as hostile natives.
43	12	"Mountains of the Moon: Part 2"	Harmon Jones	Jackson Gillis	December 1, 1967
Tarzan aids a religious group on their pilgrimage to an area known as the Mountains of the Moon.
44	13	"Jai’s Amnesia"	Harmon Jones	Jerry Adelman, William Driskill	December 15, 1967
Jai suffers a memory loss, but ends up being involved in stealing a sacred ruby.
45	14	"The Professional"	Alex Nicol	Jerry Adelman, William Driskill	January 5, 1968
A colonel and his heavily armed troops overrun the land of a peace-loving tribe, but he has reckoned without Tarzan.
46	15	"The Convert"	Harmon Jones	Jo Pagano	January 12, 1968
Three nuns become unwitting pawns in a struggle between the village chief and a scheming land developer. Diana Ross, Mary Wilson, and Cindy Birdsong of The Supremes guest star. This episode was filmed in Las Estacas Natural Reserve and Spa, located at Tlaltizapán, Morelos.
47	16	"The Creeping Giant"	Alex Nicol	Donn Mullally	January 19, 1968
Tarzan fights a powerful land owner who has duped an engineer into dynamiting a mountain range, a project that will wipe out several native villages.
48	17	"King of the Dwsari"	William Witney	Esther Shapiro, Richard Alan Shapiro	January 26, 1968
Tarzan is imprisoned when he tries to release the Dwsari tribe which has been tricked by a smooth-talking American.
49	18	"A Gun for Jai"	E. Darrell Hallenbeck	Jackson Gillis	February 2, 1968
Against the Tarzan's wishes, Jai is given a rifle by one of the local hunters. The jungle lord searches for Cheeta.
50	19	"Trek to Terror"	Barry Shear	Lee Erwin	February 9, 1968
The jungle lord is tricked into helping a corrupt police inspector who intends to murder a crusading missionary.
51	20	"End of a Challenge"	Barry Shear	Richard H. Landau	February 16, 1968
Tarzan and Chief Bangu are forced to forget their mutual animosity as they team up to search for the chief's son and Jai, who have been kidnaped by a gun-toting thief.
52	21	"Jungle Ransom"	Barry Shear	Esther Shapiro, Richard Alan Shapiro	February 23, 1968
As the jungle lord and a bandit engage in a battle of wits, a young woman tries to use both men in an effort to set free her husband, a hostage in the bandit's camp.
53	22	"The Four O’Clock Army: Part 1"	Alex Nicol	Carey Wilber	March 1, 1968
General Basil Bertram and missionary Charity Jones return in this two-part story, and this time must ally with the jungle lord against a band of slavers who have been taking people and destroying villages.
54	23	"The Four O’Clock Army: Part 2"	Alex Nicol	Carey Wilber	March 8, 1968
The jungle lord goes after the slave traders whose prisoners include Jai.
55	24	"Rendezvous for Revenge"	William Witney	Richard H. Landau	March 15, 1968
After a poacher known for his arson escapes from custody, the jungle lord tracks him and his adoring girlfriend to an oceanside cliff, and a fateful encounter. But the poacher's girlfriend and two minions later track Tarzan down and force him to lead them back to the scene.
56	25	"Alex The Great"	Barry Shear	Esther Shapiro, Richard Alan Shapiro	March 22, 1968
The task of protecting a village from a man-eating lion is complicated by the arrival of a man determined to prove himself superior to Tarzan - by killing the jungle lord.
57	26	"Trina"	Harmon Jones, Barry Shear	Milton S. Gelman	April 5, 1968
A girl requests help from Tarzan to find her long-lost uncle.

== Syndication ==
After being seen intermittently in syndication and on cable in the years after its network run, as of 2016, the series aired on the Heroes & Icons network Saturday mornings. It lasted until September 2018.

On June 4–5, 2016, the Decades TV network ran a marathon of the series. On September 9, 2016, Decades celebrated Tarzan's fiftieth anniversary repeating a few choice episodes.

== Home media ==
On March 13, 2012, Warner Bros. released Tarzan: Season 1, Part 1 & Tarzan: Season 1, Part 2 on DVD in region 1 via their Warner Archive Collection manufacture-on-demand service. The second season was released complete on September 17, 2013.

== Opening scene ==
- Iguazu Falls, in the opening scene. This series had two separate musical themes as featured in Season One. "Tarzan's March" by far being the overall favorite but was not featured in Season Two for the opening scene or the end credits. Over both seasons, the show had three different theme tunes.

"Tarzan's March" music originally composed by "Sydney Lee & Walter Greene" which gained additional fame and was covered by several artists including "Al Hirt & His Orchestra", "Marty Manning & The Cheetahs" & even "Lawrence Welk & His Orchestra". The UK group Madness also covered the title song, adding some spoken parts and performing it in a Ska arrangement, this song was included on their first album, One Step Beyond....

== In popular culture ==
The British company Airfix marketed a series of HO-00 (1/72nd) scale plastic figures of the characters based on the series.
