= Tarzan's Three Challenges =

1963 film by Robert Day

- Directed by: Robert Day
- Written by: Robert Day; Bernie Giler
- Based on: Characters created by Edgar Rice Burroughs
- Produced by: Sy Weintraub
- Starring: Jock Mahoney; Woody Strode; Ricky Der; Tsu Kobayashi
- Cinematography: Edward Scaife
- Edited by: Fred Burnley
- Music by: Joseph Horovitz
- Production company: Banner Productions
- Distributed by: Metro-Goldwyn-Mayer
- Release date: June 1963
- Running time: 92 mins.
- Language: English
- Budget: $1.2 million
- Box office: $1,000,000 (US/ Canada)

Tarzan's Three Challenges is a 1963 British-American adventure film filmed in Metrocolor. The twenty-fifth film of the Tarzan film series that began with 1932's Tarzan the Ape Man, it is a follow-up to 1962's Tarzan Goes to India. The film was Jock Mahoney's second and final turn as the apeman, was produced by Sy Weintraub, written by Robert Day and Berne Giler, and directed by Robert Day. The film was released in June 1963, and was followed by Tarzan and the Valley of Gold in July 1966.

== Plot ==
Tarzan, of Africa, is summoned to an unnamed Asian country to protect Kashi (Ricky Der), the youthful heir to the throne, from his evil uncle, Gishi Khan (Woody Strode). Arriving by parachute from a light airplane and armed with a Spanish bolo hunting knife, Tarzan dons monk's robes and travels by boat to a monastery.

The first set of three challenges are for Tarzan to prove he is worthy to be accepted into Kashi's service. First is an archery contest to test his skill. Then Tarzan stands between two tall posts, grasps handles which are attached to two ropes which run over the top of each post and are attached to buffalo. When the buffalo are driven apart, Tarzan is lifted into the air and stretched to test his strength. He passes the test by not letting go of either handle. Third, he is asked to answer a question designed to test his wisdom.

The second set of three challenges are for the young new leader, Kashi. First he must choose the correct diamond out of three. Second he must choose an empty goblet out of three. Last, he must choose one urn of ashes of the deceased previous leader out of five. After passing all three tests, Khan then comes forward and demands that Kashi take the fourth test of three challenges of life or death combat events called "The Challenge Of Might" which haven't been invoked in a thousand years. The boy chooses Tarzan as his defender, which Tarzan accepts.

Tarzan and Khan battle each other in two of the challenge events of the fourth test which concludes with the third and final challenge event with each man fighting with swords on a wide mesh net suspended above large vats of boiling oil in which Khan dies by falling through the net into one of the boiling vats.

== Cast ==
- Jock Mahoney as Tarzan
- Woody Strode as Khan / Dying Leader
- Tsu Kobayashi as Cho San, Prince's Nursemaid
- Earl Cameron as Mang
- Jimmy Jamal
- Salah Jamal as Hani
- Anthony Chinn as Tor
- Robert Hu as Nari
- Christopher Carlos as Sechung
- Ricky Der as Kashi

== Production notes ==
The film was filmed near Bangkok, Thailand and in the jungle near the Chiang Mai Province.

Midway through the film, Mahoney contracted dysentery, dengue fever and finally pneumonia. His weight plummeted from 220 pounds (100 kg) to 175 pounds (79 kg). Some critics, noting how thin and weary he appeared in some action scenes, said it undermined the film’s credibility. English Stuntman Ray Austin made the 120 ft (37 m) dive for Mahoney at Begor Bridge. Forty-four years and four months old when the film was released, Jock Mahoney became the oldest actor to portray the apeman, a record that still stands.

== Critical reception ==
A review of the film in Variety reported that "producer Sy Weintraub and his creative unit have gradually converted [Tarzan] from the simple ape man to a globetrotting troubleshooter, a kind of one-man Peace Corps in loin cloth," and "in thus broadening the scope, they have stripped the character of much of its distinguishing identity." Writing in DVD Talk, John Sinnott noted that "the settings are a bit bland at times (much to the time they're just walking through brush) but the temples and people are authentic," that Mahoney is "a very good Tarzan, but he doesn't really look the part," and that the film "features a more cerebral and thoughtful Tarzan."
