= Tarzan the Magnificent =

1960 film by Robert Day

- Movie poster
- Directed by: Robert Day
- Written by: Robert Day
- Based on: Characters created by Edgar Rice Burroughs
- Produced by: Sy Weintraub; Harvey Hayutin
- Starring: Gordon Scott; Jock Mahoney; John Carradine; Betta St. John; Al Mulock; Charles Tingwell; Lionel Jeffries
- Cinematography: Ted Scaife
- Edited by: Bert Rule
- Music by: Ken Jones
- Production company: Solar Films
- Distributed by: Paramount Pictures
- Release date: 20 July 1960 (New York City)
- Running time: 82 minutes
- Country: United Kingdom
- Language: English

Tarzan the Magnificent is a 1960 British Eastmancolor film, the follow-up to Tarzan's Greatest Adventure (1959) and the twenty-third film of the Tarzan film series that began with 1932's Tarzan the Ape Man. Its plot bears no relation to that of the 1939 Edgar Rice Burroughs novel of the same name. The film was directed by Robert Day and produced by Sy Weintraub and Harvey Hayutin. Gordon Scott made his last appearance as Tarzan in the film, while Jock Mahoney appeared as villain Coy Banton. Mahoney would take over the Tarzan role himself beginning in the next film, Tarzan Goes to India, in 1962. The motion picture does not include Jane.

== Plot ==
The Bantons (father, Abel and four sons, Coy, Ethan, Johnny and Martin) rob a pay office in a settlement, killing some people. Coy Banton is tracked down to their camp and taken away by a policeman, Wyntors. Taking him back to town, Wyntors is killed as two of the brothers seek to rescue Coy. Tarzan appears and kills Ethan Banton. The other brother escapes. Tarzan decides to take Coy to Kairobi for the $5000 reward so he can give it to Wyntors' widow. However, no one in the town of Mantu (Note: First introduced in Tarzan's Greatest Adventure.) wants to help him. The boat he is waiting for to take him and his prisoner to Kairobi is ambushed by the Bantons, who send the passengers off and destroy the boat.

Later that night Tarzan meets with the people from the boat and decides on an overland trek to take Coy Banton to Kairobi and agrees to take along, at first, the boat's mate, Tate, then reluctantly agrees to take the passengers of the boat: A business man named Ames and his wife, Fay; another man named Conway and a young woman named Lori, who all share with Tarzan their own reasons for wanting to go to Kairobi. But Tarzan warns them the trek through the jungles would be hard and dangerous. The presence of so many people to watch out for hinders Tarzan. The Bantons threaten to kill anyone who helps Tarzan. Pausing only to shoot the doctor who has told them what they want to know, the Bantons set out after the party and Coy.

Ames is a boastful and racist windbag whose wife detests him. Seeing this, Coy plays up to her, hoping he might be able to use her later. The party are captured by natives and the leader wants to kill Coy, who killed his brother when the Bantons raided their village. However, the chief's wife is having a difficult childbirth labour, and since Conway (who was a doctor) is able to help her have her baby (a breach birth), the chief agrees to let the party go.

Coy sees his chance and escapes. Thanks to Ames, Tate is shot and later dies. Tarzan again captures Coy and he hides them both in a quicksand pit as the other Bantons search for them. Later, Lori wanders off and is caught by Johnny Banton who attempts to have his way with her. As she screams, Tarzan comes to rescue her and, after a fight, Johnny dies from a shot in the face with his rifle while struggling with Tarzan and falls into a stream. Later, seeing his grave (along with Tate's), Martin Banton has had enough of a father who taught them to steal and murder by age sixteen, and leaves him.

Coy's wiles have paid off and Fay Ames releases him while the others sleep, and they leave camp together. Tarzan goes after them and finds Fay's scarf. Coy left her behind when she was out of breath and a lioness found her. Tarzan eventually comes on Coy and Abel Banton, and in a roving battle, a ricochet from Coy's rifle kills Abel. A prolonged battle on rocks, on sand and underwater follows before Tarzan finally knocks Coy out. The film ends with Tarzan and the remaining three people (Ames, Lori, and Conway) handing Coy over to the Kairobi police on the border. Tarzan instructs Conway to make sure Wyntor's widow gets the reward money.

== Cast ==
- Gordon Scott as Tarzan
- Jock Mahoney as Coy Banton
- Betta St. John as Fay Ames
- John Carradine as Abel Banton
- Lionel Jeffries as Ames
- Alexandra Stewart as Lori
- Earl Cameron as Tate
- Charles Tingwell as Conway
- Al Mulock as Martin Banton
- Gary Cockrell as Johnny Banton
- Ron McDonnell as Ethan Banton
- Harry Baird as Warrior Leader
- Christopher Carlos as Native Chief
- John Sullivan as Inspector Wyntors
- Ewen Solon as Dexter
- Jacqueline Evans as Mrs Dexter
- Thomas Duggan as Frye
- Peter Howell as Dr Blake
- John Harrison as N'Como
- George Taylor as Captain Hayes

== Production ==
Filming started 25 January 1960 in Africa.

== Critical reception ==
A review of the film in Variety noted that the "jet-age Tarzan has lost his identity, and emerges anything but ‘The Magnificent’ in this film. Instead, audiences will discover a rather glum, earthbound, unexciting version of the ape man in a slow-moving picture," that "Gordon Scott, as Tarzan, seems uncomfortable in the role," and "Director Day hasn’t made things easy on his cast." Eugene Archer's review of the film in The New York Times described it as "filmed with juvenile zest on colorful African locations," that it "presents its loin-clothed hero, Gordon Scott, with expert diction and a broad vocabulary," and "the vigorous applause from children in the audience indicates that [...] Tarzan may go on forever."

== See also ==
- List of American films of 1960
