= Tarzan Goes to India =

1962 film by John Guillermin

- Directed by: John Guillermin
- Written by: Robert Hardy Andrews; John Guillermin
- Based on: Characters created by Edgar Rice Burroughs
- Produced by: Sy Weintraub
- Starring: Jock Mahoney; Jai
- Cinematography: Paul Beeson
- Edited by: Max Benedict
- Music by: Ken Jones
- Distributed by: Metro-Goldwyn-Mayer
- Release dates: 11 July 1962 (United States); 16 December 1962 (United Kingdom)
- Running time: 88 minutes
- Countries: United States; United Kingdom; Switzerland
- Language: English
- Box office: $1.1 million (US/Canada)

Tarzan Goes to India (1962) is the first film featuring Jock Mahoney as Tarzan. The twenty-fourth film of the Tarzan film series that began with 1932's Tarzan the Ape Man, it was written by Robert Hardy Andrews and directed by John Guillermin, who also directed Tarzan's Greatest Adventure. The film also stars Indian Bollywood actors Feroz Khan, Simi Garewal and Murad in pivotal roles. It was followed by Tarzan's Three Challenges (1963) which was set in Thailand. It was one of two Mahoney films that took Tarzan out of Africa and sent him to the Far East. It was a co-production between Switzerland, the United Kingdom and the United States. Jock Mahoney had appeared as the villain Coy Banton in the previous Tarzan film, Tarzan the Magnificent.

== Plot ==
Tarzan is called to India to save three hundred elephants, that will be drowned if a dam is opened to create a man-made lake to power an electric plant. Tarzan is pitted against Bryce and O'Hara, two engineers who ignore the catastrophic results their work will create.

== Cast ==
- Jock Mahoney as Tarzan
- Jai as Elephant Boy
- Leo Gordon as Bryce
- Mark Dana as O'Hara
- Feroz Khan as Prince Raghu Kumar
- Simi Garewal as Princess Kamara
- Murad as The Maharajah
- Jagdish Raj as Raj
- G. Raghaven as Chakra
- Aaron Joseph Negoker as Driver
- Sanjay Khan as Pilot
- Pehelwan Ameer as Mooty
- K.S. Tripathi as Conservation Officer
- Peter Cooke as Foreman
- Denis Bastian as Servant

== Production ==
Gordon Scott had played Tarzan for the previous six movies in the series. Don Bragg was reportedly cast as his replacement but injured his foot and was unable to go to India. Jock Mahoney's casting was announced in December 1961 just as the unit left for India. He was the twelfth actor to play Tarzan, and had just appeared in the previous Tarzan movie, Tarzan the Magnificent, as villain Coy Banton. He had also auditioned for the role a decade previously as a replacement for Johnny Weissmuller in Tarzan's Magic Fountain but lost out to Lex Barker. The director was John Guillermin, who had made Tarzan's Greatest Adventure, the first movie in the series produced by Sy Weintraub.

Filming took place in early 1962 in Bombay, Mysore and Madras.

Guillermin later said it was difficult dealing with a dam and elephants. "It's especially difficult when you're making a film for two cents in six weeks," he said. "It really was an absurd bit of business. Technically, we did construct a bamboo wall that was used to charge 50 elephants through. You couldn't stop them for two or three miles. But, we did manage to stop them in a river bed. It was all very exciting."

Guillermin said "I'm not sure why Gordon [Scott] didn't do Tarzan Goes to India, but Jock did a good job. He was an ex-stuntman. Jock was an extremely tough guy."

Mahoney said that Guillermin would regularly abuse him during the shoot.

The poor man got sick, just very ill. He called me some names, things like yellow-bellied son-of-a-bitch. I explained to him that the last guy who talked to me that way got beaten to a pulp. But Guillermin was ill! I had to let many things slide. I was riding an elephant named Mahaveeta. And an elephant, after they're captured, decides whether to live or commit suicide. This one had a tough time getting accustomed to captivity. Whenever we would do a scene where the guns, beaters and firecrackers were surrounding her, she would be frightened to death and lie down. She would start crying, literally cry. This happened one time when I was beyond a rise and out of camera range. The idea was to lead the elephant over the rise and into camera. Well, Guillermin never saw any of this happening. I came back over the rise and he gave me an improper tongue-lashing. I didn't bother to explain to him what had happened. He was so sick out of his head. The producer, Sy Weintraub, came to me later to apologize. I was ready to leave the picture. I just didn't have to eat that kind of slop.

== Reception ==
=== Box office ===
In August 1962, Hedda Hopper reported the film was "cleaning up" at the box office. Mahoney said "Metro-Goldwyn-Mayer had just released Mutiny on the Bounty, that three-hour remake. And then came Tarzan Goes to India. Well, ol' Tarzan saved Metro's bacon. Mutiny wasn't doing very good at all. They really needed to make the bucks. The picture had all the elements going for it. They even billed me as 'The World's Greatest Stuntman' but in my opinion, Dave Sharpe was the world's greatest."

According to MGM records, however, the film recorded a loss of $178,000 for the studio.

=== Critical ===
A review of the film in Variety reported that it "has a large-scale production sheen and exotic faraway flavor" and that "Mahoney is the best Tarzan in years," but noted that "the character [Tarzan] is counterfeit. Widespread appeal of the original primitive ape man will never be duplicated by his jet age descendant, an articulate, subdued, businesslike troubleshooter." The New York Times reported that "in addition to being more verbose than his predecessors [Mahoney] is also considerably thinner," but that "coping with leopards, cobras, rampaging wild elephants or evil representatives of civilization, however, he is the same old Tarzan," and "if the background scenery of vultures, monkeys and elephant baths seems suspiciously familiar, it is nonetheless a welcome change from the cardboard African jungle Tarzan usually inhabits."

FilmInk said the movie "has two interesting concepts, neither really developed – Tarzan as a stranger in a strange land, and Tarzan is played by someone over 40. However, the action is excellent, the visuals spectacular and Mahoney ideal in the lead."

== Home media ==
Warner Bros. released the film on Blu-ray on January 29, 2019 as part of their Archive Collection line.
