= Tarzan and the Valley of Gold =

1966 film by Robert Day

- Original film poster by Reynold Brown
- Directed by: Robert Day
- Written by: Clair Huffaker
- Based on: Characters created by Edgar Rice Burroughs
- Produced by: Sy Weintraub
- Starring: Mike Henry; Nancy Kovack; David Opatoshu; Manuel Padilla Jr. Don Megowan
- Cinematography: Irving Lippman
- Edited by: Frank P. Keller
- Music by: Van Alexander
- Production company: Banner Productions
- Distributed by: American International Pictures
- Release date: 1 July 1966
- Running time: 90 minutes
- Countries: Switzerland; United States
- Language: English

Tarzan and the Valley of Gold is a 1966 Eastmancolor adventure film starring Mike Henry in his debut as Tarzan. The Panavision film (the twenty-sixth film of the Tarzan film series that began with 1932's Tarzan the Ape Man), produced by Sy Weintraub, written by Clair Huffaker, and directed by Robert Day, is remembered for its very James Bond-like portrayal of a tropical-suited, globetrotting Tarzan. Released on July 1, 1966, it was followed by Tarzan and the Great River in 1967.

The novelization by Fritz Leiber was the first authorised Tarzan novel by an author other than Edgar Rice Burroughs, and was officially the 25th book in the series.

== Plot ==
Augustus Vinero is a wealthy international criminal known for his habit of sending explosive wristwatches or necklaces to those not in his favor. When he hears of Ramel, a small boy who may know the location of the fabled Valley of Gold in Mexico, he sends a death squad of plainclothes mercenaries which destroys the farmhouse (and its inhabitants) where Ramel is being sheltered.

Prior to his murder, the head of the farmhouse summoned his old friend Tarzan to track the kidnappers and rescue the boy. Aware of Tarzan's arrival, Vinero uses one of his assassins to impersonate a taxi driver to meet Tarzan at the airport. Tarzan is driven to an ambush in an empty stadium. After the driver is killed, Tarzan kills the sniper by crushing him with a giant Coca-Cola bottle used in the stadium for advertising.

The local authorities take Tarzan to the boy's wrecked compound and offer Tarzan troops, technology and weapons for his mission. Tarzan turns them down in favor of his own equipment: a chimpanzee scout called Dinky, a lion named Major, Ramel's pet leopard, his hunting knife and his uniform of a loincloth.

Meanwhile, Vinero meets with his assembled 'army' and captain who will transport them to Mexico. He opens his special suitcase of explosives and boobytraps his office, killing the sea captain, After eliminating the captain who could relate his destination, Vinero and his private army head for the lost city in two separate parties, one led by Vinero and the other party has Ramel. Vinero's uniformed private army is well equipped with American World War II small arms, an M5A1 Stuart light tank, an M3 Half-track and a Bell 47 helicopter. Tarzan catches up with Ramel's party, the leopard is killed and Tarzan kills Vinero's thugs. Tarzan calls Vinero on a walkie-talkie and tells him what has happened and warns Vinero not to continue, Vinero sends a helicopter which Tarzan, using a captured M1919 Browning machine gun (that he fires from the hip but misses) and then a bolus of Mk 2 grenades, brings down.

Vinero had forced Sophia Renault, his mistress, to stay with him, but now sees she loathes him and his avarice for gold. He makes a pendant loaded with explosives which he places around her neck. Vinero leaves her in the bush with the explosive pendant round her neck. Tarzan finds her and removes the pendant. Ramel tells Tarzan that Sophia helped him escape. Tarzan, Sophia, Ramel, Major and Dinky head for the City of Gold.

Ignoring Tarzan's warning, Vinero's army have discovered the entrance to the Valley of Gold through a cave, previously described by Ramel. Tarzan's party arrives at the same cave. Tarzan sends the others on to warn the city's inhabitants, tracks Vinero's men in the cave entrance to the lost city and further demonstrates his expertise in weaponry by wiping out Vinero's rear guard ambush party by crushing them with stalactites hanging over them which he shoots down with a captured M1918 Browning Automatic Rifle. Vinero retreats to the cave entrance.

Tarzan goes into the city and finds that the city people are proposing to do nothing because they are too peaceful. Vinero meantime blasts a wider path through the cave and brings their vehicles to the valley. The chief says he will give away all the gold rather than lose a single life and then locks Tarzan in a room to stop him fighting. Upon arrival in the peaceful city (Tukamay), Vinero demands all the gold in the city and provides motivation by having his tank shell the buildings which kills several of the city's inhabitants. Vinero says he will return for all the gold and to meet the chief's other guest 'from Africa'.

Tarzan, now released, persuades the chief to give up all the gold and get everyone out of the city. All the gold is put in a pile in the center of the now deserted city. However, the Chief (Manco) lets slip that there is only one more piece of gold left. Vinero has his troops start to load the halftrack up with the gold and orders the chief to take him to the last piece of gold or else more lives will be lost. From a room full of junk, Vinero goes through a door, apparently made of solid gold, and starts to inspect the room which has gold dust on the floor.

Meanwhile, Tarzan gets into the tank. The loaded halftrack is being driven away but Tarzan eliminates the remainder of the army (except for the main henchman, Mr. Train), by expertly using the cannon of the tank on the halftrack and the army. As Vinero eagerly attempts to pull a golden ornament off the wall, the ceiling releases enough gold dust to fill the room and smother him, at the same time as Tarzan fights and defeats Vinero's hulking Oddjob-type henchman, Mr. Train.

With the threat from Vinero's army ended, Tarzan knows that it is time to leave the Valley of Gold. He leaves Dink and Major to guard Ramel and he heads off with Sophia. Tarzan (with Vinero's special suitcase in hand) and Sophia leave the Valley of Gold and travel back through the warren of caves. At the mouth of the cave, Tarzan opens Vinero's special and uses the explosives within to seal the opening of the cave. Assured that the Valley of Gold is now sealed off from any future treasure hunter, Tarzan and Sophia return to the outside civilization.

== Cast ==
- Mike Henry as Tarzan
- David Opatoshu as Augustus Vinero, international villain
- Manuel Padilla Jr. as Ramel, a kidnapped boy. Padilla Jr. would also play Jai opposite Ron Ely in NBC's television series
- Nancy Kovack as Sophia Renault, Tarzan's ally
- Don Megowan as Mr. Train, Vinero's hulking henchman
- Enrique Lucero as Perez
- Edwardo Noriega as Insp. Talmadge
- John Kelly as Captain Voss
- Francisco Reiguera as Mango
- Frank Brandstetter as Ruiz
- Carlos Rivas as Romulo
- Jorge Beirute as Rodriguez
- Oswald Olvera as Antonio

== Production notes ==
This was filmed entirely on location in Mexico – near Acapulco, at Mexico City's Plaza de Toros, at the Chapultepec Castle, the Teotihuacan ruins, and in the caves at Guerrero.

Nancy Kovack replaced Sharon Tate in the role of Sophia Renault just before filming began in 1965. Tate can be seen with Henry in publicity stills that were published in newspapers when the film was announced.

Early drafts of the script were entitled, Tarzan and the Treasure of Tucumai and Tarzan '66.

== Critical response ==
A contemporary review of the film in The New York Times reported that "it does offer a few random amusements for the adult patron who, by some peculiar twist of fate, happens to see the picture unaccompanied by a small child," but added that it is "curiously witless." Writing in DVD Talk, critic John Sinnott noted that the "film hasn't aged as well as the others in the series, but it's still a lot of fun" and that it is "still worth watching," but added that having "Tarzan fire a Browning Machine Gun (one of those heavy tripod-mounted things) from the hip and drive a tank makes him seem more like a resourceful spy than the Lord of the Jungle."

== Home media ==
Tarzan and the Valley of Gold was released by Warner Home Video on DVD on 20 April 2010, as part of their Warner Archives DVD-on-demand collection.

== Novel ==
Tarzan and the Valley of Gold
- Author: Fritz Leiber
- Series: Tarzan (book series)
- Publisher: Ballantine Books
- Publication date: April 1966
- Media type: Print (paperback)
- Pages: 317
- ISBN: 90-01-73325-5
- OCLC: 4154942
- Preceded by: Tarzan and the Castaways (1965)
- Followed by: Tarzan: The Lost Adventure (1995)

The Edgar Rice Burroughs estate chose Fritz Leiber to write an authorised novel based on Huffaker's screenplay. Leiber's novel was released in paperback by Ballantine Books in April 1966, and features an expanded version of the film's story with footnotes detailing connections to Tarzan's past adventures as chronicled by Burroughs. An ebook edition was issued by Gateway/Orion in August 2013, and a hardcover edition illustrated by Richard Hescox by Edgar Rice Burroughs, Inc. in August 2019.

== Sources ==
- Essoe, Gabe (1968). Tarzan of The Movies. The Citadel Press.

Preceded by Tarzan and the Castaways	Tarzan series Tarzan and the Valley of Gold	Succeeded by Tarzan: The Lost Adventure
