= Tarzan of the Apes (1999 film) =

- Home video cover art
- Written by: Mark Young based on the novel by Edgar Rice Burroughs
- Based on: Tarzan of the Apes by Edgar Rice Burroughs
- Produced by: Diane Eskenazi; Darcy Wright
- Distributed by: Sony Wonder; Sony Music Entertainment
- Release date: March 9, 1999
- Running time: 48 minutes
- Country: United States
- Language: English

Tarzan of the Apes is a 1999 animated musical adventure film produced by Diane Eskenazi and Darcy Wright and written by Mark Young (based on the novel by Edgar Rice Burroughs). Richard Wagner's Ride of the Valkyries was used as the score during the opening scenes of the film. It was released directly to home video on March 9, 1999. The apes appear to be chimpanzees in this version, however they are not explicitly identified as such, unlike the unrelated 1999 Disney film (which came out that same year) in which they are gorillas.

== Plot ==
John and Alice Clayton (Lord and Lady Greystoke) are marooned on the coast of Africa, where their son, John Clayton Jr., is born. The baby is orphaned when both parents die of a mysterious disease, but is adopted by Kala and Kerchak, members of the tribe of Brown Apes.

The baby, christened Tarzan ("White Skin") by Kala, grows to adulthood among the apes, and eventually discovers the cabin where his parents lived. He teaches himself to read and write using the books there. He also discovers a cache of gold coins secreted beneath a loose floorboard in the cabin.

Jane Porter, her father, Professor Archimedes Porter, and Esmerelda, their cockney housekeeper, are shipwrecked at the same location, and soon Jane and Tarzan fall in love. The Porters and Esmerelda are rescued and sail to America, believing that Tarzan has been killed.

Tarzan, with the help of Lieutenant Paul D'Arnot, sails to Baltimore, Maryland, where he is reunited with Jane. Tarzan's identity as Lord Greystoke is discovered, and he and Jane are married and return to Africa.

== Cast ==
The voice cast was uncredited in this film.

== Songs ==
"Child of My Dreams", "Tarzan of the Apes" and "Everlasting Love".

== Production notes ==
The film was released as part of the Sony Wonder Enchanted Tales series.

The film was produced in 1997, but was only released to home video just before the debut of the Disney Tarzan production.
