= Edward Scaife =

English cinematographer

- Scaife on the set of Black Narcissus (1947)
- Born: 23 May 1912; London, England
- Died: November 1994 (aged 81–82); Chichester, West Sussex, England
- Other name: Ted Scaife
- Occupation: Cinematographer
- Years active: 1944–1979

Edward Scaife BSC (23 May 1912 – November 1994), also credited as Ted Scaife, was an English cinematographer.

He worked originally in the sound department of a London film company. From 1940 onwards, Scaife was a member of the camera crew in productions such as Michael Powell's Black Narcissus (1947) and John Huston's The African Queen.

From 1951 he was first employed as a chief camera man, and photographed films of all genres, including Night of the Demon (1957), 633 Squadron (1964), Khartoum (1966), and The Dirty Dozen (1967), before retiring from the industry in 1979.

== Selected filmography ==
- 1947: Black Narcissus (Camera operator)
- 1949: The Third Man (Camera operator)
- 1951: Pandora and the Flying Dutchman (2nd Unit Photographer)
- 1951: Outcast of the Islands
- 1951: The African Queen (Second Unit photography)
- 1953: The Intruder
- 1954: An Inspector Calls
- 1954: Twist of Fate (1954 film) (U.S. ' Beautiful Stranger ')
- 1955: A Kid for Two Farthings
- 1956: Smiley
- 1957: Night of the Demon
- 1959: The House of the Seven Hawks
- 1959: Tarzan's Greatest Adventure
- 1960: Carry on Constable
- 1962: The Dock Brief
- 1962: The List of Adrian Messenger (European Unit Director of Photography)
- 1963: Tarzan's Three Challenges
- 1964: 633 Squadron
- 1965: Young Cassidy
- 1966: Khartoum
- 1967: The Dirty Dozen
- 1968: Dark of the Sun
- 1969: Play Dirty
- 1969: A Walk with Love and Death
- 1969: Sinful Davey
- 1970: The Kremlin Letter
- 1971: Catlow
- 1978: The Water Babies (Scaife won Best Cinematography award at Fantafestival, 1981)
