= Tarzan and the Great River =

1967 film by Robert Day

- Directed by: Robert Day
- Written by: Bob Barbash story by Bob Barbash and Lewis Reed
- Based on: Characters created by Edgar Rice Burroughs
- Produced by: Sy Weintraub; Steve Shagan
- Starring: Mike Henry; Jan Murray; Manuel Padilla Jr. Rafer Johnson; Diana Millay
- Cinematography: Irving Lippman
- Edited by: Anthony Carras; Edward Mann; James Nelson
- Music by: William Loose
- Production companies: Banner Productions; Allfin A.G.
- Distributed by: Paramount Pictures
- Release date: September 1, 1967
- Running time: 88 mins.
- Country: United States
- Language: English

Tarzan and the Great River is a 1967 adventure film starring Mike Henry in his second of three film appearances as Tarzan. The twenty-seventh and penultimate film of the Tarzan film series that began with 1932's Tarzan the Ape Man, the film was produced by Sy Weintraub and Steve Shagan, written by Bob Barbash (from a story by Barbash and Lewis Reed), and directed by Robert Day. Released on September 1, 1967, it was followed by Tarzan and the Jungle Boy in 1968.

== Plot ==
Tarzan is called to Brazil by an old friend, The Professor (Paulo Gracindo) to help stop the Jaguar Cult, led by Barcuma (Rafer Johnson), from destroying native villages and enslaving the survivors in his search for diamonds. Tarzan is assisted by Captain Sam Bishop (Jan Murray), a riverboat pilot, and Bishop's young ward, Pepe (Manuel Padilla Jr.), as well as Baron (a lion) and Cheeta (a chimpanzee). On their way they encounter Dr. Ann Philips (Diana Millay), who has witnessed the destruction of a village, and wants to continue fighting a plague by giving much-needed inoculations to natives who live along the Amazon River. After overcoming many challenges, Tarzan tracks down Barcuma and, after a long fight, kills him by drowning him in a pool of water. The Captain, Dr. Phillips and Pepe depart on the river boat, leaving Tarzan to assist the tribe now freed from Barcuma’s control.

== Cast ==
- Mike Henry as Tarzan, the British Lord of Greystoke
- Jan Murray as Captain Sam Bishop, an American crusty riverboat pilot, ally to Tarzan
- Manuel Padilla, Jr. as Pepe, Sam Bishop's youthful native ward
- Rafer Johnson as Barcuma, Afro-Brazilian leader of the Jaguar Cult
- Diana Millay as Dr. Ann Philips, American physician attempting to inoculate Brazilian natives
- Paulo Gracindo as The Professor, Tarzan's Brazilian old friend
- Eliezer Gomes as Barcuma's Afro-Brazilian lieutenant (uncredited)
- Carlos Eduardo Dolabella as Agonizing tribesman in canoe (uncredited)
- Luz del Fuego as Tribeswoman (uncredited)

== Production notes ==
The movie was filmed entirely on location in Rio de Janeiro, Brazil (Rio de Janeiro Zoo, Parque Lage and Tijuca Forest).

Dinky, the chimp portraying Cheeta, bit Mike Henry on the jaw during filming, requiring twenty stitches. The chimpanzee was destroyed, and Henry later sued the producers for this accident and other unsafe working conditions on all three of his Tarzan films. The parties settled out of court.

== Critical response ==
A contemporary review of the film in Variety described it as "[b]eautifully photographed against striking and often magnificent scenery," but noted that "Zoologists probably will be a bit startled to learn that African maned lions roam the Brazilian jungles, as well as hippos who splash in the Amazon," and that Henry's "physique is better than his acting." Critic John Sinnott wrote on DVD Talk that the film "would have been a much better [...] if they had made Captain Sam a straight character. His shtick doesn't fit in with the movie at all, and what's worse is that it's not funny," and that the "banter between Sam and Pepe is supposed to be humorous and cute, but it's just dumb."
