= Tarzan's Hidden Jungle =

1955 film by Harold D. Schuster

- Directed by: Harold D. Schuster
- Screenplay by: William Lively
- Based on: Characters created by Edgar Rice Burroughs
- Produced by: Sol Lesser
- Starring: Gordon Scott; Vera Miles; Jack Elam
- Cinematography: William Whitney A.S.C.
- Edited by: Leon Barsha
- Music by: Paul Sawtell
- Color process: Black and white
- Distributed by: RKO Radio Pictures
- Release date: February 16, 1955 (US)
- Running time: 73 minutes
- Country: United States
- Language: English

Tarzan's Hidden Jungle is a 1955 black-and-white film from RKO Pictures directed by Harold D. Schuster and starring Gordon Scott in his first film as Tarzan, taking over the role from Lex Barker, who had in turn followed Johnny Weissmuller in the series. The film about Edgar Rice Burroughs' ape-man also features Vera Miles and Jack Elam. The last of twelve Tarzan pictures released by RKO before the rights returned to MGM and the eighteenth overall film of the Tarzan film series that began with 1932's Tarzan the Ape Man, it was followed by Tarzan and the Lost Safari in 1957.

Tarzan's mate, Jane, does not appear in the film. Tarzan at first seems to show more than casual interest in Miles' character Jill Hardy, but ultimately there is no romance. In real life, Scott and Miles were married after the film was completed. Scott eventually played Tarzan in six movies over a five-year span.

== Plot ==
Two hunters come into the jungle intent on killing as many animals as they can in order to get barrels of animal fat, lion skins and elephant tusks. Tarzan tries to help a baby elephant, one of their first victims. He takes the elephant to an animal doctor and his female assistant, who have pitched their tents in the jungle to do business. The hunters turn up and pretend they are photographers and have the doctor escort them to where the animals are. They leave the doctor and scare the animals to their hunting area. The doctor's assistant finds out what they're really up to and goes after them but needs Tarzan's help when she stumbles into quicksand. He rescues her, and she says she needs a bath so Tarzan throws her into the river.

They reach a tribe that worships animals and who are Tarzan's friends. However, the tribe hears that animals are being slaughtered and decide to kill the doctor and his assistant, who were responsible for leading the hunters there. Tarzan goes after the villains and they end up getting their just deserts. He arrives back in time to save the doctor and his assistant after they have been thrown into a pit of lions.

== Cast ==
- Gordon Scott as Tarzan
- Vera Miles as Jill Hardy
- Peter van Eyck as Dr. Celliers
- Jack Elam as Burger
- Charles E. Fredericks as DeGroot
- Richard Reeves as Reeves
- Don Beddoe as Mr. Johnson
- Jester Hairston as Witch Doctor
- Rex Ingram as Sukulu Chieftain
- Ike Jones as Malenki
- Maidie Norman as Suma

== Critical reception ==
A review of the film in Variety described it as "a stock entry in the Edgar Rice Burrough apeman marathon," and noted that Baxter "is a well muscled man but seldom convincing in the part" and " direction rarely rises above the script deficiencies, and the insertion of stock animal footage fails to match the quality of the footage proper."

== See also ==
- List of American films of 1955
