= Robert Day (director) =

British film director (1922–2017)

- Born: Robert Frederick Day; 11 September 1922; Sheen, England
- Died: 17 March 2017 (aged 94); Bainbridge Island, Washington, U.S.
- Occupation: Film director
- Years active: 1956–1991
- Spouse(s): Eileen Pamela Day (m. 1948; div. 1968) Dorothy Provine (m. 1968; died 2010)
- Children: 2

Robert Frederick Day (11 September 1922 – 17 March 2017) was an English film director. He directed more than 40 films between 1956 and 1991.

== Biography ==
Day was born in Sheen, England. He worked his way up from clapper boy to camera operator then cinematographer while in his native country, and began directing in the mid-1950s. His first film as director, the black comedy The Green Man (1956) for the writer-producer team of Frank Launder and Sidney Gilliat, gained good reviews. Using this as a starting point, Day went on to become one of the industry's busiest directors. He directed several Tarzan films.

He relocated to Hollywood in the 1960s and directed many TV episodes and made-for-TV movies. He occasionally had small parts in his own productions, including The Haunted Strangler (1958), Two-Way Stretch (1960), and the TV mini-series Peter and Paul (1981).

In the 1970s and 1980s, Day would direct episodes of numerous American television shows, including Barnaby Jones, The F.B.I., Dallas, Walt Disney's Wonderful World of Color, and Matlock.

== Personal life ==
Day married Eileen Day in 1948. The couple had a daughter together, Roberta (born 1952), before divorcing in 1968, when he married actress Dorothy Provine. He and Provine had a son together, Robert (born 1969), and were married until her death in 2010. He was the brother of cinematographer Ernest Day.

Day died at the age of 94 on Bainbridge Island near Seattle on 17 March 2017.

== Selected filmography ==
- The Green Man (1956)
- The Haunted Strangler (1958)
- Corridors of Blood (1958)
- First Man into Space (1959)
- Life in Emergency Ward 10 (1959)
- Two-Way Stretch (1960)
- Tarzan the Magnificent (1960)
- The Rebel (1961)
- Operation Snatch (1962)
- Tarzan's Three Challenges (1963)
- She (1965)
- Tarzan and the Valley of Gold (1966)
- Tarzan and the Great River (1967)
- The Reluctant Heroes (TV film, 1971)
- The Secret of the Pond (TV film, 1975)
- The Initiation of Sarah (1978)
- Murder by Natural Causes (1979)
- The Man with Bogart's Face (1980)
- Peter and Paul (1981)
- The Lady from Yesterday (1985)
- Celebration Family (1987)
- The Quick and the Dead (1987)
