= Mike Henry (American football) =

American football player and actor (1936–2021)

- Henry in 1971
- Born: Michael Dennis Henry; August 15, 1936; Los Angeles, California, U.S.
- Died: January 8, 2021 (aged 84); Burbank, California, U.S.
- Occupations: Football linebacker, actor
- Years active: 1957–1988 (actor); 1958–1964 (football player)
- Spouse: Cheryl Sweeney (m. 1984)
- Children: 1
- Football career

No. 68, 37, 53
- Position: Linebacker

Personal information
- Listed height: 6 ft 2 in (1.88 m)
- Listed weight: 220 lb (100 kg)

Career information
- High school: Bell (Bell, California)
- College: USC
- NFL draft: 1958: 9th round, 100th overall pick

Career history
- Pittsburgh Steelers (1959–1961); Los Angeles Rams (1962–1964)

Awards and highlights
- Second-team All-PCC (1957)

Career NFL statistics
- Interceptions: 9
- Fumble recoveries: 6
- Stats at Pro Football Reference

Michael Dennis Henry (August 15, 1936 – January 8, 2021) was an American professional football linebacker and actor. He was best known for his role as Tarzan in the 1960s film trilogy and as Junior in the Smokey and the Bandit trilogy.

== Football career ==
Henry attended Bell High School in Los Angeles, where his play caught the attention of USC Trojans alum John Ferraro, who arranged for him to get a tryout at USC. He attended USC and was co-captain of the 1957 USC Trojans football team.

Henry joined the NFL when he was drafted by the Pittsburgh Steelers in the 9th round of the 1958 NFL draft, playing for them from 1958 until 1961. With hopes of pursuing an acting career, he requested and received transfer to the Los Angeles Rams, playing with them from 1962 through 1964.

== Acting career ==
Henry's most prominent role was as Tarzan in three 1960s movies Tarzan and the Valley of Gold (1966), Tarzan and the Great River (1967), and Tarzan and the Jungle Boy (1968) that were all filmed back-to-back in 1965. At the time, critics said the dark-haired, square-jawed, muscular Henry resembled classic illustrations of the apeman more than any other actor who had taken on the role. Henry turned down the lead of the subsequent Tarzan television series, which then went to Ron Ely.

Henry is probably best known to movie audiences for playing Jackie Gleason's character's son Junior in the Smokey and the Bandit comedies starring Burt Reynolds and Sally Field.

Henry portrayed a corrupt prison guard in The Longest Yard (1974). Henry played Sergeant Kowalski in The Green Berets (1968), Luke Santee in More Dead Than Alive (1968), and corrupt Sheriff "Blue Tom" Hendricks in Rio Lobo (1970). He also acted with Charlton Heston in three films: the football movie Number One (1969), Skyjacked (1972), and Soylent Green (1973).

Henry played Lt. Col. Donald Penobscot in an episode of the television series M*A*S*H. In another football-oriented role, he portrayed Tatashore, one of the members of the gang who kidnap Larry Bronco (Larry Csonka) in the "One of Our Running Backs Is Missing" episode of The Six Million Dollar Man.

== Personal life ==
Henry and his wife, Cheryl Sweeney, were married in 1984. He had a daughter from a previous marriage, Shannon Noble.

== Illness and death ==
After being diagnosed with Parkinson's disease, he retired from acting in 1988. Henry died on January 8, 2021, at the age of 84 at Providence Saint Joseph Medical Center in Burbank, California, after years of complications from both Parkinson's disease and chronic traumatic encephalopathy.

== Filmography ==
- Curfew Breakers (1957) as Reagan
- General Hospital (1963, TV Series) as Rudolpho (1988)
- Spencer's Mountain (1963) as Spencer Brother (uncredited)
- Palm Springs Weekend (1963) as Doorman (uncredited)
- Tarzan and the Valley of Gold (1966) as Tarzan
- Tarzan and the Great River (1967) as Tarzan
- Tarzan and the Jungle Boy (1968) as Tarzan
- The Green Berets (1968) as Sergeant Kowalski
- More Dead Than Alive (1968) as Luke Santee
- Number One (1969) as Walt Chaffee
- Rio Lobo (1970) as Sheriff Tom Hendricks
- Walt Disney's Wonderful World of Color (1972) as Fargo
- Skyjacked (1972) as Sam Allen
- Soylent Green (1973) as Kulozik
- The Longest Yard (1974) as Rassmeusen
- Mean Johnny Barrows (1976) as Carlo Da Vince
- Adiós Amigo (1976) as Mary's Husband
- No Way Back (1976) as Goon #3
- Smokey and the Bandit (1977) as Junior Justice
- M*A*S*H (1977, TV Series) as Donald Penobscot
- Smokey and the Bandit II (1980) as Junior Justice
- Fantasy Island (1981, TV Series) as Mike
- Smokey and the Bandit Part 3 (1983) as Junior Justice
- Outrageous Fortune (1987) as Russian #1
