= Gordon Scott =

American actor (1926–2007)

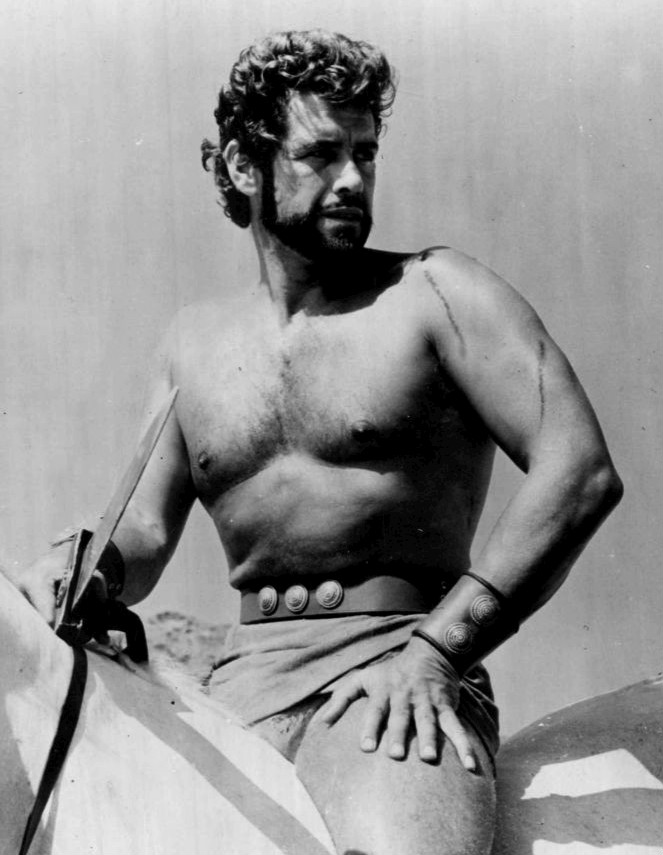
- As Hercules for a 1965 ABC Television special
- Born: Gordon Merrill Werschkul; August 3, 1926; Portland, Oregon, U.S.
- Died: April 30, 2007 (aged 80); Baltimore, Maryland, U.S.
- Resting place: Kensico Cemetery; Valhalla, New York
- Occupation: Actor
- Years active: 1955–1967
- Height: 6 ft 3 in (1.91 m)
- Spouses: Janice Mae Wynkoop (m. 1948; div. 1949) Vera Miles (m. 1956; div. 1960)
- Children: 2

Gordon Scott (born Gordon Merrill Werschkul; August 3, 1926 – April 30, 2007) was an American film and television actor known for his portrayal of the fictional character Tarzan in five films (and one compilation of three made-as-a-pilot television episodes) of the Tarzan film series from 1955 to 1960. Gordon Scott was the 11th Tarzan, starting with Tarzan’s Hidden Jungle (1955). He was "discovered" poolside, and offered "a seven-year contract, a loin cloth, and a new last name."

== Early life, education, and military service ==
Scott was born Gordon Merrill Werschkul in Portland, Oregon, one of nine children of advertising man Stanley Werschkul and his wife Alice. He was raised in Oregon and attended the University of Oregon, located in Eugene, for one semester.

Upon leaving school, he was drafted into the United States Army in 1944. He served as a drill sergeant and military policeman until he was honorably discharged in 1947. He then worked at a variety of jobs until 1953, when he was spotted by a talent agent while working as a lifeguard at the Sahara Hotel and Casino, located on the Las Vegas Strip in Nevada.

== Career ==
"Due in part to his muscular frame and 6-foot-3-inch [1.91-metre] height, he was quickly signed to replace Lex Barker as Tarzan" by producer Sol Lesser. Lesser had Gordon change his name because "Werschkul" sounded too much like "Weismueller".

Scott's Tarzan movies ranged from rather cheap re-edited television pilots to large-scale action films with high production values shot on location in Africa. In his early Tarzan films, he played the character as unworldly and inarticulate, in the mold of Johnny Weissmuller, an earlier Tarzan portrayer. In Scott's later films, after a change in producers, he played a Tarzan who was educated and spoke perfect English, as in the original Edgar Rice Burroughs novels. Scott was the only actor to play Tarzan in both styles.

Fearing he would become typecast as Tarzan, Scott moved to Italy and became a popular star in epics of the péplum genre (known in the United States as sword-and-sandal), featuring handsome bodybuilders as various characters from Greek and Roman myth. Scott was a friend of Steve Reeves, and collaborated with him as Remus to Reeves's Romulus in Duel of the Titans (1961). Scott also played Hercules in a couple of international co-productions during the mid-1960s. As the péplum genre faded, Scott starred in spaghetti Westerns and Eurospy films. His final film appearance was in The Tramplers (filmed in 1966; released in the United States in 1968).

== Personal life ==
Scott was married twice. His first marriage was to Janice Mae Wynkoop of Oakland, California. They met when he was a lifeguard at Lake Temescal, located in Oakland. The couple married in Reno, Nevada, in 1948, and had one child, Karen Judith Werschkul (born August 26, 1948), before divorcing in 1949. He was married to actress Vera Miles, his Tarzan co-star, from 1956 to 1960. He had one son with Miles – Michael, born 1957 – and possibly several other children.

Scott appeared as a contestant on the CBS television program, I've Got a Secret, on the February 16, 1955 episode.

For the last two decades of his life, Scott was a popular guest at film conventions and autograph shows.

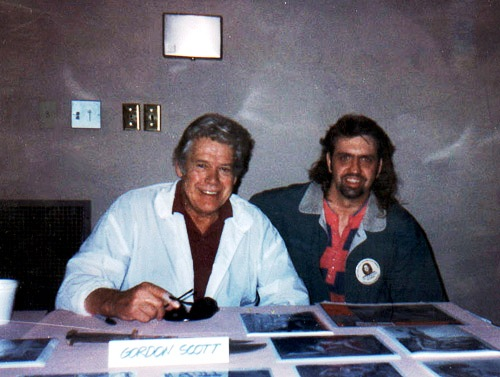
Gordon Scott with a fan in 1995

== Death ==
Scott died, aged 80, in Baltimore, Maryland of lingering complications from multiple heart surgeries earlier in the year. He is buried in the Kensico Cemetery, located in Valhalla, New York.

== Filmography ==
=== Tarzan films ===
| Year | Title | Roles | Notes |
|---|---|---|---|
| 1955 | Tarzan's Hidden Jungle | Tarzan | Scott married co-star Vera Miles |
| 1957 | Tarzan and the Lost Safari | Tarzan | the first Tarzan film successfully shot and released in color |
| 1958 | Tarzan's Fight for Life | Tarzan | Scott's only Tarzan film to include the character Jane |
| 1959 | Tarzan's Greatest Adventure | Tarzan | Sean Connery co-starred as a villain |
| 1960 | Tarzan and the Trappers | Tarzan | failed television pilot; not aired until 1966 |
| 1960 | Tarzan the Magnificent | Tarzan | Scott's successor in the Tarzan role, Jock Mahoney, played the villain |

=== Other roles ===
| Year | Title | Genre | Role | Notes |
|---|---|---|---|---|
| 1961 | Goliath and the Vampires | peplum | Maciste / Goliath | |
| 1961 | Samson and the Seven Miracles of the World | sword and sandal | Maciste / Samson | |
| 1961 | Duel of the Titans | sword and sandal | Remus | |
| 1962 | Kerim, Son of the Sheik | adventure film | Kerim | |
| 1962 | Gladiator of Rome | adventure film | Marcus | |
| 1962 | A Queen for Caesar | historical drama film | Julius Caesar | |
| 1963 | Zorro and the Three Musketeers | swashbuckler | Zorro | |
| 1963 | The Shortest Day | comedy | Soldato | Uncredited |
| 1963 | The Beast of Babylon Against the Son of Hercules | adventure film | Nippur | |
| 1963 | Goliath and the Rebel Slave | peplum | Goliath / Gordian | |
| 1963 | The Lion of St. Mark | adventure film | Manrico Venier | |
| 1963 | Hercules Against Moloch | sword and sandal | Glaucus ('Hercules') | |
| 1964 | Coriolanus: Hero without a Country | historical drama film | Coriolanus | |
| 1964 | Hero of Rome | historical drama film | Gaius Mucius Scaevola | |
| 1964 | Karim, the Sheikh's Son | | Karim | |
| 1964 | Buffalo Bill, Hero of the Far West | Spaghetti Western | Colonel William "Buffalo Bill" Cody | |
| 1965 | Hercules and the Princess of Troy | fantasy film | Hercules | television pilot |
| 1965 | The Tramplers | Spaghetti Western | Lon Cordeen | |
| 1967 | Danger!! Death Ray | Eurospy film | Bart Fargo | |
| 1967 | Top Secret | Eurospy film | John Sutton | (final film role) |

== See also ==
- List of people from Oregon
- Tarzan in film and other non-print media

| Preceded by Lex Barker | Tarzan; 1955–1960 | Succeeded by Denny Miller |
