= Sy Weintraub =

American film producer

Sy Weintraub (May 28, 1923 – April 4, 2000) was an American film and television producer best known for his series of Tarzan films and television episodes between 1959 and 1968. He also produced two Sherlock Holmes films for television and was an owner of Panavision.

== Career ==
After World War II service in the US Army, he formed Flamingo Films with David L. Wolper, who acquired the television rights to Eagle-Lion Films in 1951.

Starting in 1958 Weintraub produced the Tarzan franchise.

In 1965 Weintraub bought Panavision and sold it later. National General Corporation acquired Weintraub's Banner Productions in 1967 and Weintraub became an officer, director and shareholder of NGC. In March 1969, he was retained on an consultancy basis for 5 years, receiving a percentage of the gross from Tarzan properties. In 1967 he was briefly president of the CBS Television Network.

In retirement he speculated in the silver market, owned race horses and built one of the world's largest collections of ancient coins.

Weintraub died of pancreatic cancer on April 4, 2000. He had two daughters.
