= Jiggs (chimpanzee) =

Chimpanzee actor in the 1930s

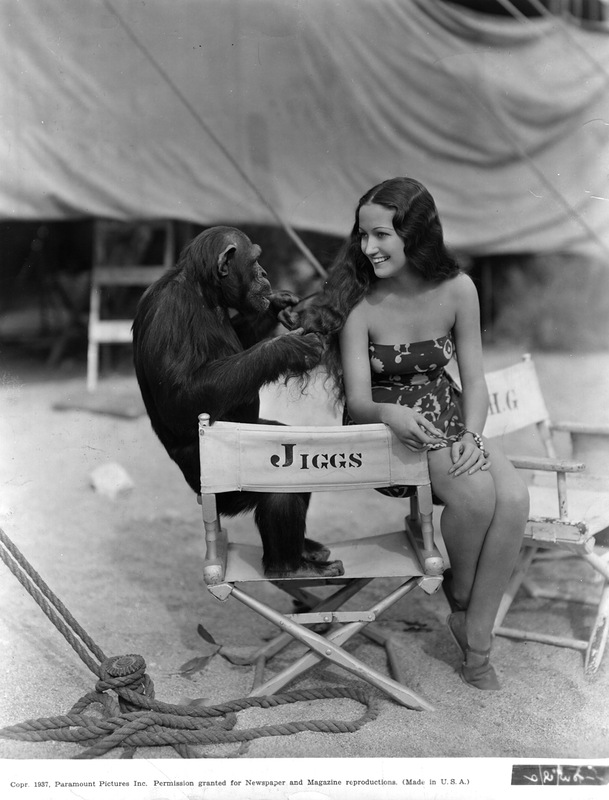
- Dorothy Lamour (1914-1996) with Jiggs
- Species: Chimpanzee (Pan troglodytes)
- Sex: Male
- Born: c. 1929
- Died: March 1, 1938 (aged 8–9)
- Cause of death: Pneumonia
- Resting place: Los Angeles Pet Cemetery
- Occupation: Actor
- Years active: 1932–1938
- Known for: The first chimpanzee to play the character Cheeta
- Owners: Tony & Jacqueline Gentry
- Residence: Los Angeles Pet Cemetery

Jiggs (c. 1929 – March 1, 1938) was a male chimpanzee and animal actor who originated the character of Cheeta in the 1930s Hollywood Tarzan movies. He was owned and trained by Tony and Jacqueline Gentry.

== Early life ==
Jiggs was said to have been brought over from Africa by Gary Cooper, who sold him because the animal became difficult to handle. More reliably, Jacqueline Gentry claimed to have raised and trained Jiggs from infancy. He is stated to have been brought up with a collie named Spanky and to have later refused to do any film work without the dog present. Spanky was also used to help control Jiggs on the set.

== Career ==
Jiggs had a seven-year film career. He appeared as Cheeta in the first two Johnny Weissmuller Tarzan films, Tarzan the Ape Man (1932) and Tarzan and His Mate (1934). He may have appeared in the third of the series, Tarzan Escapes (1936), as well. He also appeared in the rival Buster Crabbe serial Tarzan the Fearless (1933) and the Herman Brix serial The New Adventures of Tarzan (1935), also released in feature-film form as Tarzan and the Green Goddess (1938). In the Brix films, which were more faithful to Edgar Rice Burroughs' original stories than Weissmuller's, Jiggs was cast as Nkima, not Cheeta.

Jiggs was cast in at least three additional films, the Laurel and Hardy short Dirty Work (1933), the Our Gang short Divot Diggers (1936), and the Dorothy Lamour film Her Jungle Love (1938), which was his last picture.

== Film anecdotes ==
On the set of Tarzan the Fearless, Jiggs successfully extracted a thorn from the hand of female lead Jacqueline Wells after she and lead actor Buster Crabbe both failed.

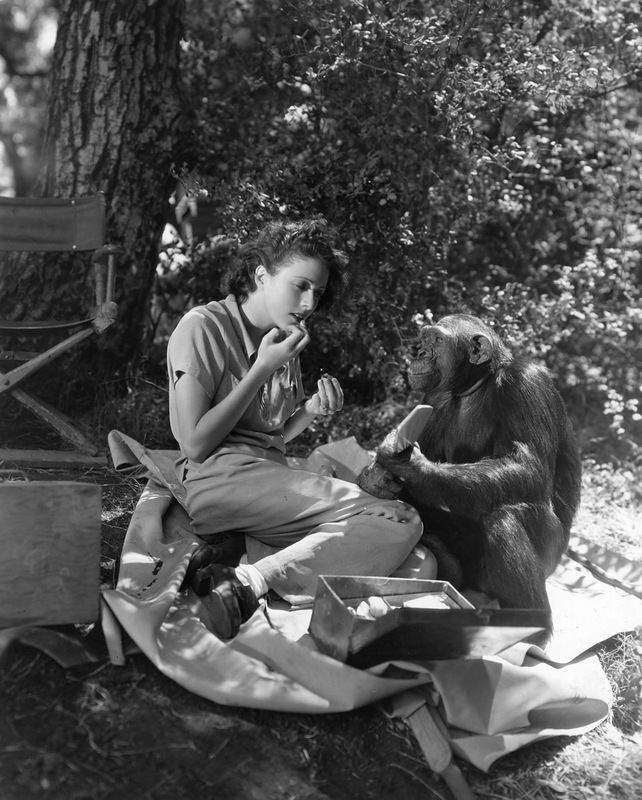
Molly Lamont with Jiggs

His trainers, the Gentrys, appear to have separated by early 1936, as Jacqueline alone is cited as his owner in news stories of that date and after.

In July 1936, during the filming of Her Jungle Love Jiggs attacked lead actress Dorothy Lamour, who was rescued by a film aide. He was then subdued by his owners and the collie Spanky.

In December 1936, Jiggs had an encounter on set with actress Martha Raye in which they made faces at each other and Raye lit him a cigarette.

== Death ==
Jiggs died on February 28, 1938 or March 1, 1938, at age 9, of pneumonia, and his funeral was planned for March 2, 1938, in the Los Angeles Pet Cemetery. However, due to the Los Angeles Flood of 1938, Jiggs was laid to rest on March 4.

== Filmography ==
- Tarzan the Ape Man (1932) - Cheeta
- Dirty Work (1933) - The Chimpanzee
- Tarzan the Fearless (1933) - Cheeta
- Tarzan and His Mate (1934) - Cheeta
- The New Adventures of Tarzan (1935) - Nkima
- Divot Diggers (1936) - Chimpanzee
- Tarzan and the Green Goddess (1938) - Nkima
- Her Jungle Love (1938) - Gaga

== Later Gentry chimpanzees of the same name ==
Tony Gentry was a professional animal trainer who owned a number of apes, at first together with his wife Jacqueline and later on his own. Gentry later owned three other chimps he named Jiggs, two of whom have also been associated with the Cheeta role. Jiggs, Jr. (also known as Jiggs II), was a male chimpanzee born about 1935. Stated to have gone to the Baltimore Zoo when Tony Gentry went into the service in World War II, his ultimate fate is unknown. Cheeta (also known as Jiggs IV) was a male chimpanzee born about 1960, who later resided at the C.H.E.E.T.A. (Creative Habitats and Enrichment for Endangered and Threatened Apes) Primate Sanctuary in Palm Springs, California. For many years, Gentry stated that Jiggs IV was the original Cheeta, which was not true. On May 5, 2022, Cheeta/Jiggs IV died at the C.H.E.E.T.A. sanctuary in Palm Springs, California.

== See also ==
- List of individual apes
