= Cheeta =

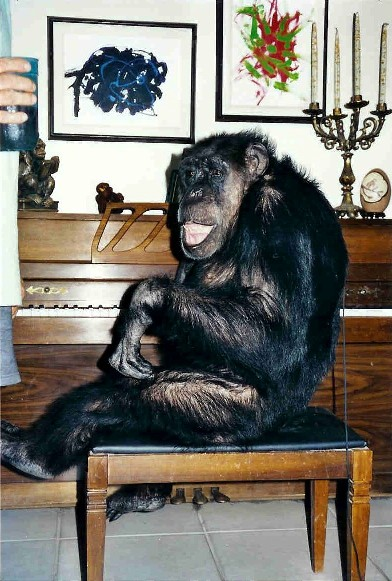
- Portrait of "Cheeta" (Jiggs IV), long alleged to be the principal animal performer of the Cheeta role
- First appearance: Tarzan the Ape Man
- Portrayed by: Jiggs and other animals

In-universe information
- Aliases: Cheetah, Cheta, Chita
- Species: Chimpanzee
- Gender: Male

Cheeta (sometimes billed as Cheetah, Cheta, or Chita) is a chimpanzee character that appeared in numerous Hollywood Tarzan films of the 1930s–1960s, as well as the 1966–1968 television series, as the ape sidekick of the title character, Tarzan. Cheeta has usually been characterized as male, but sometimes as female, and has been portrayed by chimpanzees of both sexes.

While the character of Cheeta is inextricably associated in the public mind with Tarzan, no chimpanzees appear in the original Tarzan novels by Edgar Rice Burroughs that inspired the films. The closest analog to Cheeta in the Burroughs novels is Tarzan's monkey companion Nkima, who appears in several of the later books in the series.

== Role ==
Cheeta's role in the Tarzan films and TV series is to provide comic relief, convey messages between Tarzan and his allies, and occasionally lead Tarzan's other animal friends to the ape-man's rescue.

== Portrayers of the character ==
The character of Cheeta was a composite role created through the use of numerous animal actors, over a dozen according to one source. According to journalist R. D. Rosen, "In each Tarzan movie, the Cheeta role [was] played by more than one chimp, depending on what talents the scene called for." Known and alleged performers of the role are given in the following table (see the comments following the table for the sources of the data).

Name	Sex	Species	Born	Died	Owner(s)	Trainer(s)	Period as Cheeta
Jiggs	M	Chimpanzee	ca.1929	1938-02-28 or 1938-03-01	Tony & Jacqueline Gentry	Tony & Jacqueline Gentry	1932–1934
Jacky I	M	Chimpanzee	ca.1930	Unknown	Gertrude Davies Lintz	Gertrude Davies Lintz	1932
David Holt	M	Human	1927-08-14	2003-11-15	Inapplicable	Inapplicable	1933
Cheetah-Mike (a.k.a. Org)	M	Chimpanzee	Unknown; ca.1931 claimed	2011-12-24	See comments	Unknown	Possibly never; 1930s–1940s claimed
Jiggs, Jr. (a.k.a. Jiggs II)	M	Chimpanzee	ca.1935	Unknown	Tony & Jacqueline Gentry	Tony & Jacqueline Gentry	1930s–1940s?
Unknown 1	?	Chimpanzee	1930s	Unknown	Unknown	Unknown	1930s
Skippy	M	Chimpanzee	1930s		Erna Sinclair	Erna Sinclair	1940-1960
Unknown 2	?	Chimpanzee	1930s	Unknown	Unknown	Unknown	ca.1933–1943
Jacky III	M	Chimpanzee	Unknown	Unknown	Gertrude Davies Lintz	Gertrude Davies Lintz	1942
Cheta	?	Chimpanzee	ca.1937	Unknown	Unknown	George Emerson	1943
Unknown 3	?	Chimpanzee	1940s	Unknown	Unknown	See comments	1944–1945?
Unknown 4	?	Chimpanzee	1940s	Unknown	Unknown	Albert Antonucci	1946–1949?
Harry	M	Chimpanzee	ca.1944	Unknown	Unknown	Unknown	1948
Cheeta	?	Chimpanzee	1940s	Unknown	Pinky Jackson	Pinky Jackson	1950
Cheeta	F	Chimpanzee	ca.1948	1957-09-06	Ed Rogers	Unknown	1950s
Zippy	M	Chimpanzee	ca.1951	Unknown	Ralph Quinlan	Ralph Quinlan	1950s
Dinky	F	Chimpanzee	Unknown	1965	Unknown	Unknown	1965
Cheetah	?	Chimpanzee	1960s?	Unknown	Unknown	Unknown	1966–1968?
C.J.	M	Orangutan	1970s?	Unknown	Unknown	Unknown	1981
Cheeta (a.k.a. Jiggs IV)	M	Chimpanzee	ca.1960; ca.1932 claimed	2022-05-05	Tony Gentry; Dan Westfall	Tony Gentry	2007, 2014; 1930s–1950s claimed

More details about these performers:

- Jiggs, a male chimpanzee born about 1929 owned and trained by Tony and Jacqueline Gentry, originated the role and appeared in the first two Johnny Weissmuller Tarzan films, Tarzan the Ape Man (1932) and Tarzan and His Mate (1934), as well as the Tarzan serials Tarzan the Fearless (1933), starring Buster Crabbe, and The New Adventures of Tarzan (1935), starring Herman Brix, which was also released in feature-film form as Tarzan and the Green Goddess (1938). In the Brix films, which were more faithful to Edgar Rice Burroughs' original stories than the Weissmuller ones, Jiggs was cast as Nkima, not Cheeta. He also appeared in the Laurel and Hardy film Dirty Work (1933), and Her Jungle Love (1938), starring Dorothy Lamour, his last film. Jiggs died on February 28, 1938 or March 1, 1938 at age 9, of pneumonia, and was buried March 2, 1938, in the Los Angeles Pet Cemetery. Not to be confused with Captain Jiggs, a well-known contemporary chimpanzee owned by Gertrude Davies Lintz, or with Mr. Jiggs, an orangutan who appeared in The Jungle Book (1942) and numerous other films, before he was retired in May 1943.
- Jacky I, a male chimpanzee owned by Gertrude Davies Lintz for two years before appearing with Johnny Weissmuller in the latter's first Tarzan film
- David Holt, who as a six-year-old child actor appeared uncredited as a human double for the role in Tarzan the Fearless (1933).
- Cheetah-Mike (also known as Org) was a male chimpanzee from Suncoast Primate Sanctuary after being donated from Noell's Chimp Farm in Palm Harbor, Florida. Alleged to have been born about 1931 (claimed age in February 2008 was 77), to have been acquired from the estate of Johnny Weissmuller in 1957, and to have been "one of the original 'Cheetahs' from Johnny Weissmuller's Tarzan movies." It has been speculated that he may actually have come from a Florida tourist attraction the actor once launched that included chimpanzees, rather than having appeared in any of his Tarzan films. According to journalist Andrew Woods, this Cheeta was also known as Org. He died in Palm Harbor, Florida, of kidney failure on December 24, 2011.
- Jiggs, Jr. (also known as Jiggs II) was a male chimpanzee born about 1935 owned and trained by Tony and Jacqueline Gentry, said to have appeared in a number of Tarzan films and possibly other movies. He was stated to have gone to the Baltimore Zoo when Gentry went into the service in World War II. His ultimate fate is unknown.
- Unknown 1 was a chimpanzee stated to have been a juvenile understudy to Jiggs in one of the Weissmuller Tarzan films, that on one occasion accompanied Weissmuller and a 14-foot boa constrictor on a visit to newspaper columnist Nelson B. Bell.
- Skippy was a chimpanzee who reportedly "took over when Jiggs died in the late 1930s."
- Unknown 2 was a chimpanzee stated to have portrayed Cheeta for 10 years from around 1933 until retirement in 1943, possibly the same as the above. This Cheeta's last film was presumably Tarzan's Desert Mystery (1943), as the first film of its successor was Tarzan and the Amazons (1945).
- Jacky III was a male chimpanzee formerly owned by Gertrude Davies Lintz, that appeared "in the 'Tarzan' film released in early 1942" (presumably Tarzan's Secret Treasure, released December 1, 1941, or Tarzan's New York Adventure, released in May 1942).
- Cheta was a chimpanzee of undetermined sex born about 1937 trained by George Emerson, stated to be the current chimpanzee under contract by Metro for the Tarzan films in March, 1943.
- Unknown 3 was a chimpanzee stated to have replaced the 1933–1943 Cheeta, cast in 1944 with a trainer from the St. Louis Zoo hired as handler for Tarzan and the Amazons (1945).
- Unknown 4 was a chimpanzee trained by Albert Antonucci that had apparently played Cheeta for three years as of April, 1949; Antonucci is known to have been Cheeta's trainer for the films Tarzan and the Huntress (1947) and Tarzan's Magic Fountain (1949), so presumably this Cheeta played in these films and the intervening Tarzan and the Mermaids (1948); Antonucci himself was stated to be slated for an acting role in the next Tarzan film, to be titled Tarzan and the Golden Lion, presumably a working title for the actual next film in the series, Tarzan and the Slave Girl (1950), but if so, his role was uncredited or performed under a stage name. Whether he continued to serve as Cheeta's handler in that film, or indeed whether "his" Cheeta was the one who appeared in it, is unknown.
- Harry was a male chimpanzee born about 1944, possibly the same as the above, stated to be playing Cheeta in the Tarzan films in May, 1948.
- Cheeta was a chimpanzee owned and trained by Pinky Jackson, who made personal appearances in promotion of the Tarzan films at six Sidney Lust theaters in Maryland in early December, 1950. Possibly, he was the Cheeta that appeared in the then-current Tarzan film, Tarzan and the Slave Girl (1950), or may have been retained only for the promotional appearances.
- Cheeta, a female chimpanzee born about 1948 owned by Ed Rogers, is stated to have appeared in 42 films, including Tarzan films as Cheeta and the television program Truth or Consequences as Beaulah. She died at age 9 on September 6, 1957, in Cypress, California, shot by deputy sheriffs after breaking out of her cage, attacking her owner, and charging at a group of children.
- Zippy was a male chimpanzee born about 1951, owned and trained by Ralph Quinlan, and is stated to have appeared as Cheeta in Tarzan films of the mid-1950s, including the Gordon Scott film Tarzan's Hidden Jungle (1955).
- Dinky was a female chimpanzee who appeared under that name in Tarzan and the Valley of Gold (1966) and as Cheeta in Tarzan and the Great River (1967); both movies were filmed in 1965. She bit Mike Henry, the actor playing Tarzan, during the filming of the latter, after which she was killed. Henry later sued the producers for this incident and other unsafe working conditions on his three Tarzan films.
- Cheetah was the chimpanzee appearing with Ron Ely in the 1966–1968 Tarzan TV series, said to be the only trained animal on the show.
- C.J., a male orangutan, is stated to have played Cheeta in the 1981 remake Tarzan, the Ape Man, and (more famously) Clyde in the 1978 Clint Eastwood film Every Which Way But Loose; however, the Clyde role has elsewhere been attributed to Manis, a different orangutan.
- Cheeta (also known as Jiggs IV) was a male chimpanzee born about 1960, formerly owned by Tony Gentry and had resided at the C.H.E.E.T.A. Primate Sanctuary (Creative Habitats and Enrichment for Endangered and Threatened Apes) in Palm Springs, California. He was claimed by Gentry to have been born in 1932 or later in the 1930s, and to have portrayed Cheeta in most of the Johnny Weissmuller and Lex Barker Tarzan films, and for that reason long celebrated as the longest-lived chimpanzee on reaching the supposed age of 64 in 1996 (chimpanzees typically live to be 35 in the wild). Both claims were debunked by journalist R. D. Rosen in 2008 in an article that settled the animal's true age and established that he had not appeared in any movies, let alone in the role of Cheeta. However, he did appear as Cheeta in the TV movie 07 Spaceys and a news segment featuring his "75th" birthday, both in 2007, and the documentary See No Evil in 2014. According to journalist Andrew Woods, who "interviewed" this Cheeta in 2008, his "offstage" name was Jiggs IV. Following Gentry's death in 1991, Jiggs IV was adopted by his nephew Dan Westfall. On May 5, 2022, Jiggs IV died at the C.H.E.E.T.A. sanctuary in Palm Springs, California.

== Tony Gentry's Cheeta hoax ==
Late in his life, Tony Gentry, who had been the co-owner and trainer of the original Cheeta (Jiggs), made extravagant claims in regard to another chimpanzee he owned and its connection with the Cheeta role. This animal, known as both Cheeta and Jiggs IV, was falsely alleged by Gentry to have been the primary animal actor portraying Cheeta in the Tarzan movies over the years. He also greatly exaggerated the age of the animal to support this claim. For a number of years both before and after Gentry's death this story passed unexamined and became a matter of general belief.

=== Gentry's allegations ===
Tony Gentry made various claims regarding Cheeta's (Jiggs IV) age, origins, and supposed movie roles. Some of these claims conflicted with each other.

In the usually related account, Gentry originally acquired the animal by purchase from Henry Trefflich, a New York animal importer and dealer. Cheeta was supposedly born in the wild in Liberia some months prior to 9 April 1932, which is celebrated as his birthday because it is the date he is said to have arrived in the United States, in New York City. Other accounts of Cheeta's origins from Gentry include having found the animal himself in the Belgian Congo in 1932 or having bought him in Santa Monica about 1938 or in the late 1940s.

Gentry's acquaintances and fellow animal trainers Hubert Wells, Stewart Raffill, and Cheryl Shawver have disputed all of these accounts, stating that "Tony got that chimp from Wally Ross ... one of the managers of Pacific Ocean Park on the pier in Santa Monica" when the park closed in 1967. According to them, Cheeta was only about 6 or 7 years old at that time, which would put his birthdate around 1960 or 1961 rather than 1932.

Gentry claimed Cheeta/Jiggs IV was the primary animal actor used in the role of Cheeta in the Tarzan movies. His first appearance as Cheeta is usually stated to have been in the second Johnny Weissmuller Tarzan film, Tarzan and His Mate (1934), uncredited as a young chimpanzee riding on the back of the older chimp (Jiggs) who originated the role. He was then allegedly cast in the role himself in the other Weissmuller Tarzans that followed, as well as the succeeding Lex Barker Tarzan films, This would have given Jiggs IV a film career as Cheeta extending from 1934 to 1953, a period prior to his actual birth, and during which several other chimpanzees are known to have portrayed the character. Journalist R. D. Rosen, who investigated this story, stated that Jiggs IV never in fact appeared in any Tarzan film.

Besides his supposed role as Cheeta in the Tarzan films, Cheeta/Jiggs IV reputedly appeared as other chimpanzee characters in unrelated films, including Ramona the Chimp in Bela Lugosi Meets a Brooklyn Gorilla (1952) and Chee-Chee in Doctor Dolittle (1967) with Rex Harrison, supposedly his last role before retirement. However, according to Wells, Raffill, and Shawver, as reported by R. D. Rosen, Cheeta never appeared in any movies; Rosen himself confirmed that the animal could not have been the Chee-Chee in the Dolittle film.

=== Later life of Cheeta/Jiggs IV as a celebrity ===
In the mid-1980s, the myth of Tony Gentry's chimp Cheeta/Jiggs IV being the original Cheeta from the movies was unexpectedly perpetuated when a film studio employee, looking for an opportunity to make headlines, stumbled on the (false) story of this supposedly very long-lived chimp and decided to create an extravagant fundraiser, complete with amateur New Wave cover bands and cash bar, to pay for installation of a star on Hollywood's Walk of Fame for Cheeta. Unfortunately for the inexperienced organizers of this unofficial "charitable" event, the Hollywood Chamber of Commerce outright denied the application for the star (as well as many previous and subsequent applications), and eventually the funds from the 1985 marathon party were donated to Gentry, who then lived in the Los Angeles suburb of Thousand Oaks, for the care of Cheeta/Jiggs IV. The final result of the probably well-meaning efforts by this "useful idiot" was a party in Hollywood enjoyed by many, a good sum of money raised and donated to Gentry, and perpetuation of the dual myths that Cheeta/Jiggs IV was indeed the former movie star chimp, and are now in his mid-50s.

In 1991, whatever the truth of his origins and prior life, Cheeta/Jiggs IV was given by Gentry to his distant cousin Dan Westfall, who served as the animal's caretaker for the remainder of its life. Gentry died two years later. In Westfall's care, Cheeta lived at a primate sanctuary called Creative Habitats and Enrichment for Endangered and Threatened Apes (or CHEETA) in Palm Springs, California, where he reportedly watched television, made abstract paintings which were sold to benefit primate-related charities, and often watched "his" old films with his grandson, Jeeter. He also leafed through books and "played" the piano.

His birthdays, calculated from the date of his supposed 1932 arrival in the United States, were regularly celebrated. In 2006, coinciding with his "74th" birthday, Cheeta received an award for his supposed film career from the International Film Festival of Peñíscola Comedy. Later that year, the 4 October 2006, edition of the Palm Springs newspaper, The Desert Sun, reported that he had received his first-ever visit from famed primatologist Jane Goodall the previous day. His "75th" birthday was covered by National Geographic. His "76th" birthday was celebrated on 9 April 2008, at his "Casa de Cheeta" in Palm Springs at an event hosted by Dan Westfall and Diane Weissmuller, (Johnny Weissmuller, Jr.'s widow). The press and many Palm Springs celebrities attended.

On the basis of his fictitious history, Cheeta was cited by the Guinness Book of World Records as the world's oldest nonhuman primate. An equally fictitious purported ghost-written "autobiography" of the chimp, Me Cheeta, was published in the U.K. in October 2008. The American edition was published on March 3, 2009.

On May 5, 2022, Cheeta/Jiggs IV died at the C.H.E.E.T.A. sanctuary in Palm Springs, California.

== Honors ==
In March 1995, the character of Cheeta was honored with a Golden Palm Star on the Palm Springs, California, Walk of Stars.

Since 2004, unsuccessful attempts have been made to secure a star for Cheeta on the Hollywood Walk of Fame, and as of 2008, filmmaker Matt Devlen was continuing the effort. Attempting for the seventh time to get a sidewalk star, the handlers of Cheeta/Jiggs IV launched an online petition to get supporters to urge the Hollywood Chamber of Commerce to give a star in 2009. The petition was unsuccessful.

== Influences ==
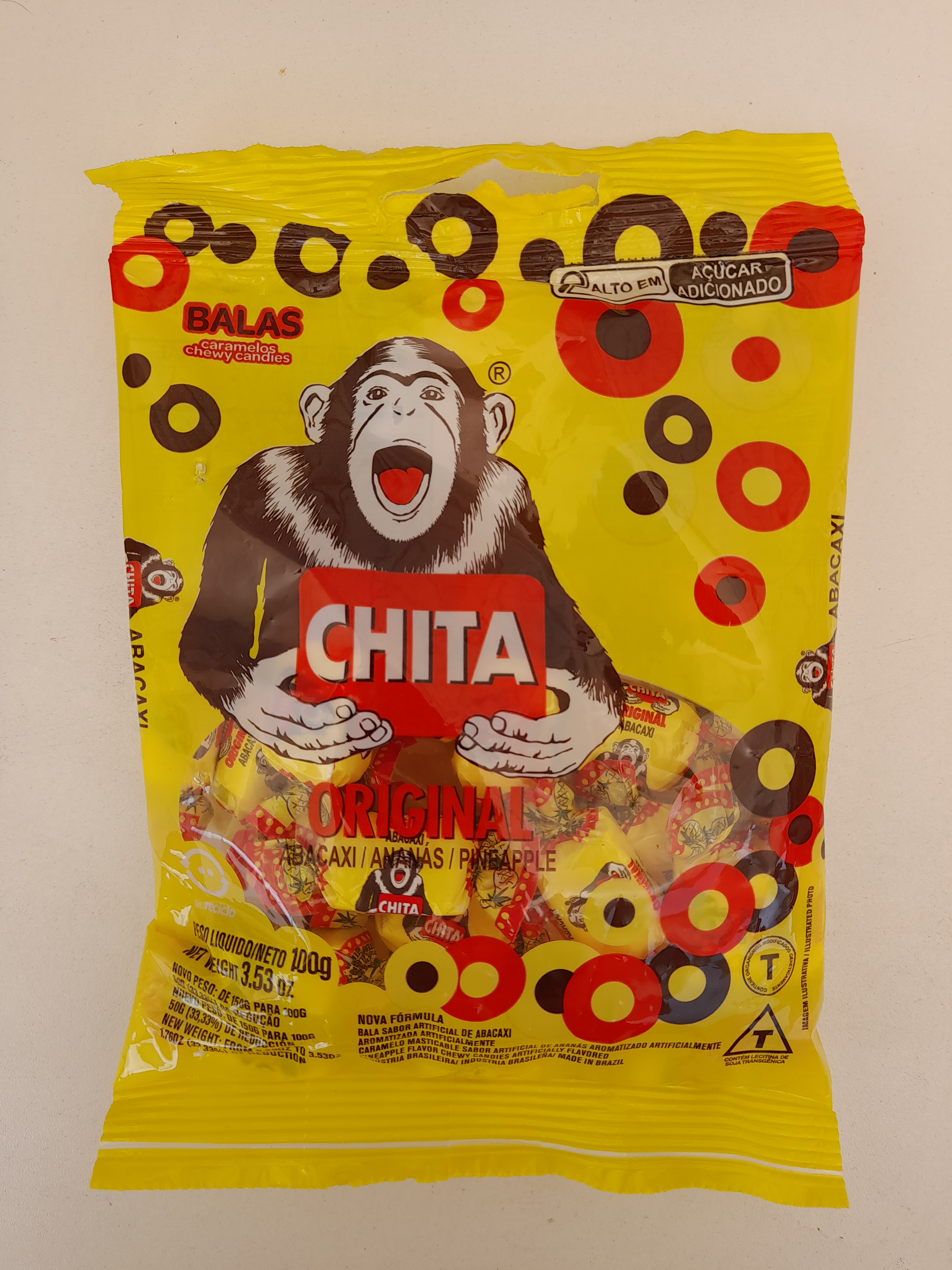
Brazilian candy

The character of Chemistry, from the Doc Savage stories, is said to have been inspired by Cheeta.

== See also ==
- List of individual apes
