= The New Adventures of Tarzan =

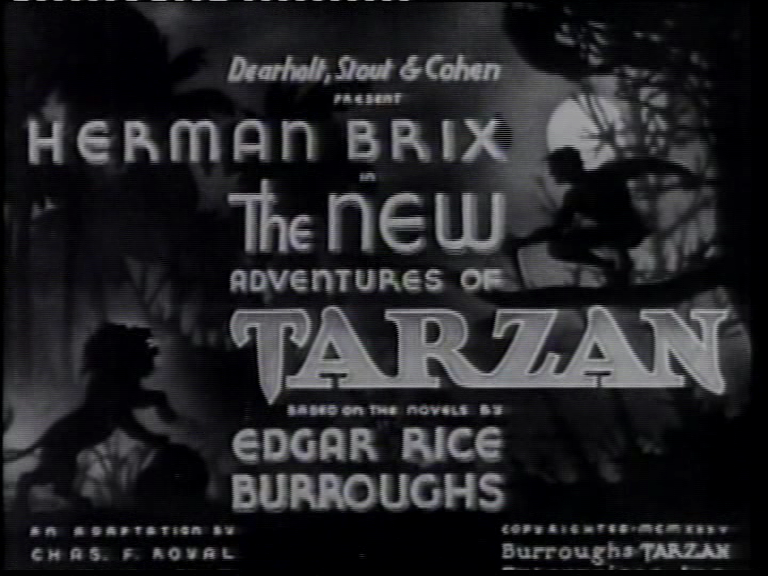
- Title card
- Directed by: Edward Kull; Wilbur F. McGaugh
- Written by: Edwin Blum; Bennett Cohen; Basil Dickey; Charles F. Royal; Edgar Rice Burroughs (original character)
- Produced by: Edgar Rice Burroughs; Ashton Dearholt; George W. Stout
- Starring: Herman Brix; Ula Holt; Ashton Dearholt; Frank Baker; Lewis Sargent
- Cinematography: Edward A. Kull; Ernest F. Smith
- Edited by: Harold Minter; Thomas Neff; Edward Schroeder; Walter Thompson
- Music by: Mischa Bakaleinikoff
- Distributed by: Burroughs-Tarzan Enterprises Inc.
- Release date: May 21, 1935 (US)
- Running time: 257 minutes
- Country: United States
- Language: English

The New Adventures of Tarzan is a 1935 American film serial in 12 chapters starring Herman Brix. The serial presents a more authentic version of the character than most other film adaptations, with Tarzan as the cultured and well-educated gentleman in the original Edgar Rice Burroughs novels. It was filmed during the same period as the Johnny Weissmuller/Metro-Goldwyn-Mayer Tarzan films. Film exhibitors had the choice of booking the serial in 12 episodes, the feature film (also called The New Adventures of Tarzan), or the feature film followed by 11 episodes of the serial.

The serial was partly filmed in Guatemala, and Tarzan was played by Herman Brix (known post-war as Bruce Bennett). The final screenplay was credited to Charles F. Royal and, from Episode 6 onward, also Basil Dickey. It was produced by Ashton Dearholt, Bennett Cohen and George W. Stout under the corporate name of “Burroughs-Tarzan Enterprises, Inc.” (which also distributed) and was directed by Edward Kull and Wilbur F. McGaugh.

== Plot ==
The original version of the plot proposed involvement of munitions runners and government agents, focussing more on the super-explosive formula hidden in the idol. This was rewritten during production, but some elements remain, such as the otherwise nonsensical final chapter name "Operator No. 17" and Ula Vale's unexplained periodic use of disguises in the first few chapters. (Ula Vale was originally written as a government agent using "Operator No. 17" as her code name; this plot element was dropped from the revised script, but only after some scenes from the earlier shooting script had been filmed, along with the main title cards.)

Several plot elements bring the characters together in search (and pursuit) of the Guatemalan idol known as The Green Goddess: Tarzan's friend D'Arnot has crash landed in the region and is in the hands of a lost tribe of jungle natives; Major Martling is leading an expedition to find the fabled artefact for a powerful explosives formula hidden within it; Ula Vale's fiancé died in an earlier expedition to rescue the artefact for its archaeological benefit, and so she starts one of her own in his honour; and Raglan has been sent by Hiram Powers, Ula's lawyer, to steal the valuable idol for himself. In addition to containing the explosives formula, the idol also holds a fortune in jewels.

Tarzan, Ula and Major Martling locate the lost city containing the idol and rescue D'Arnot from the natives who worship it in the 70-minute-long first episode. However, Raglan escapes with the Green Goddess and heads through the jungle for the coast. Tarzan and the others pursue him across the jungle, encountering many perils, including recapture by the natives to whom the idol belonged. The adventures end out at sea, where, during a hurricane, they are able to permanently secure the idol while Raglan is killed by another of Powers's agents because of his failures. The murderer perishes when the ship sinks.

Returning to Greystoke Manor in England with Tarzan, Ula consigns the explosives formula to fire in the final episode, where she and Tarzan also recount several adventures from the first part of the serial to an assembled party of friends and colleagues.

== Cast ==
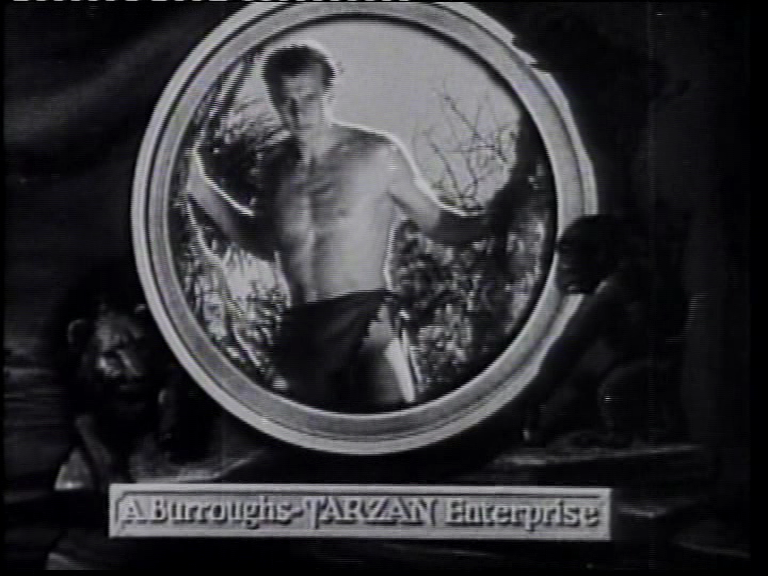
Herman Brix as Tarzan

- Herman Brix as Tarzan, or Lord Greystoke, who travels from Africa to Guatemala to rescue his friend, French Lt. d'Arnot, who bailed out of his plane just before it crashed, following a lightning strike, into the uncharted jungles of Guatemala and is believed to be held by a tribe of lost natives. Douglas Fairbanks Jr. had suggested Herman Brix to MGM to play Tarzan. However, Brix broke his shoulder filming Touchdown for Paramount, and because his recovery period was uncertain, MGM cast Johnny Weissmuller in Tarzan the Ape Man instead. Sources disagree about Burroughs' involvement with Brix's casting. Some stated that Brix was hand-picked for this serial by Burroughs while others state that it was Dearholt who cast Brix and that Brix only briefly met Burroughs afterwards for a handshake and some photographs. Brix was never paid for his work on this film and after the war changed his name to "Bruce Bennett" in order to escape typecasting and work in quality projects again.
- Ula Holt as Ula Vale, on her own expedition to find the Green Goddess in memory of her fiancé, who died in d'Arnot's crashed plane flying to Guatemala to find the Goddess. This was not Holt's only known film role. She was discovered by, and soon married, the producer, Ashton Dearholt. In the original version, the character was to be revealed as government agent Operator 17, but this was changed during production.
- Ashton Dearholt as P.B. Raglan, a mercenary villain sent by one Hiram Powers to steal the valuable Green Goddess. Dearholt is also the producer of this serial. According to the pressbook, he had to take the role at the last minute after the original actor, Don Castello, became ill. In reality, "Don Castello" was merely a pseudonym chosen by Dearholt, who had previously starred himself in several silent films of his own making and planned all along to do so here.
- Frank Baker as Major Francis Martling, archaeologist leader of another expedition to find the Green Goddess, with whom Tarzan and Ula Vale join forces.
- Lewis Sargent as George, bumbling comic relief; Major Martling's assistant.
- Jiggs as Nkima, Tarzan's chimpanzee. Nkima, rather than Cheetah, is the name of Tarzan's animal companion in Burroughs' books, though in the books he is a monkey rather than a chimp. Jiggs earned $2,000 for this role.
- Dale Walsh as Alice Martling, the Major's daughter, who accompanies him on his expedition.
- Harry Ernest as Gordon Hamilton, Alice's fiancé and also part of Martling's expedition. The original draft story called for Gordon and Alice to become separated from the expedition and hunted and arrested by Guatemalan authorities as gun runners. However, this entangling subplot was dropped, and Gordon and Alice both return to America in the third episode, along with d'Arnot, and are not seen again excepting some incidental shots in the final episode.
- Jackie Gentry as Queen Maya, leader of the natives of the Lost City, who, in the first chapter, offers Tarzan a chance to become her "consort" in lieu of being executed along with his captured friends, only to find herself sternly rebuffed, and who is unexplainedly missing from the Lost City during scenes set there in a later episode. In real life, Ms. Gentry was the wife of Tony Gentry, Nkima's trainer and handler.
- Jack Mower as Captain Blade, in the eleventh chapter, a schooner-master associate of Raglan's who eventually turns on that villain before meeting his own demise in a shipwrecking hurricane.
- Merrill McCormick as Bouchart, in the first chapter, who comes to Africa to alert Tarzan to d'Arnot's disappearance; and also as "Pedro", a Guatemalan associate of Ula Vale.
- Jean de Briac as D'Arnot, Tarzan's friend;
- Unidentified Players include the actors portraying Hiram Powers, Raglan's boss back in Africa; Padre Muller, Martling's priest-contact in Chichicastenango; and several prominent henchmen, including two who bedevil Tarzan by tossing him from a balcony, then later bind him tightly to a massive tree trunk.

== Production ==
=== Burroughs-Tarzan Enterprises ===
In 1929, a would-be movie entrepreneur, Ashton Dearholt, arranged an introduction to Edgar Rice Burroughs, using his wife's friendship with Burroughs' daughter. Dearholt had held several jobs within the film industry during the 1920s and had even produced, directed and starred in a brief series of western films. As of 1929, he was familiar with Burroughs' work and wanted to get the rights to one of Burroughs' several singleton novels and film it in conjunction with RKO-Pathé. Burroughs, long dissatisfied with Hollywood's treatment of his Tarzan character, refused, but he took a liking to Dearholt personally and they became friends.

MGM's contract with Burroughs was for just two pictures and this had run out with Tarzan and His Mate. In the summer of 1934, Dearholt and two business associates, George W. Stout and Bennett Cohen, approached Burroughs to form an independent company, Burroughs-Tarzan Enterprises, through which Dearholt and his partners would make films from Burroughs' works as they had been written, while Burroughs could use the business to coordinate his numerous other Tarzan-related products, organizations and franchises. Burroughs agreed, as he believed would receive a much larger amount of money than in his previous contracts with (MGM, which had made several million with their two Tarzan films despite only paying Burroughs about $75,000). Dearholt quickly outlined a story, which he called Tarzan and the Green Goddess, based on which Charles F. Royal and Edwin Blum then wrote the screen treatment, renaming it Tarzan in Guatemala, as Guatemala had been chosen by Dearholt as the film's location. He had visited that country in 1933 as a trouble-shooter for RKO Pictures and felt that he knew enough about the country, had the contacts there, including within the government, and could make the film far more economically than in Hollywood. Therefore, in late 1934, Dearholt "led an expedition" of 29 cast and crew, with several tons of freight, aboard the liner Seattle to begin filming in highland ruins in Guatemala. The expedition almost never got started, however, as Dearholt's personal credit would not support the loan he estimated he needed to make the picture. Burroughs had to reluctantly involve himself as co-signatory, and the loan was approved the day before the party was due to sail.

Far from being the low-cost, exotically located, adventurous film-making experience Dearholt anticipated, this decision caused unusual production problems. When the cast and crew arrived in Guatemala, there was no harbour, so they had to be shuttled ashore by boats across three miles of sea during a storm. Once there, they were held up by customs and security officers of President Jorge Ubico, whose assistance Dearholt had counted on and had even written into the serial's final episode as a character (whether he intended to ask the Presidente to play himself is not known). Once ashore, the party was housed in a hotel with no in-room plumbing, having to use outhouses "stacked" alongside each story of the structure.

It then took 18 hours to travel the 100 miles to Chichicastenango, on a plateau 6,447 ft above sea level. The production then moved on to Lake Atitlán, Tikal, and to Guatemala City. Guatemala had no motion picture industry of its own, so everywhere they went the company had to carry tons of equipment brought with them from the States, including an enormous sound truck that was not designed for the winding, dirt mountain highways which made up most of the country's transit infrastructure. Tropical diseases abounded, and apparently every cast member was stricken at least once and laid up, unable to work, for weeks. The local wildlife was also a problem. According to an interview with Herman Brix in the Christian Science Monitor (1999), "there was only a single sharpshooter up in the trees to keep the croc away from me." The local climate became another problem when the production was affected by tropical storms and some film was damaged by the humid environment of the very real jungle.

The loan obtained in California was used up long before the picture was finished, and the expedition evidently had to waste additional time hiding from local creditors and the police in the jungles before returning to California, where the picture was finished. Nevertheless, the film was finished in four months, with the title changed again to The New Adventures of Tarzan.

=== Filming locations ===
Film locations for The New Adventures of Tarzan in Guatemala.

In spite of the difficulties faced while filming in the jungles, most of the places visited by the filming crew and actors were served by the American company International Railways of Central America (IRCA). In 1935, the railroad service in Guatemala was at its peak, controlled by the American IRCA, and had major stations at Puerto San José, Guatemala City and Puerto Barrios, which allowed the crew to transport their equipment easily to these locations. The only difficult locations to reach were Chichicastenango and Tikal, since there were no IRCA services available to those places, although there was airline service to Peten available.

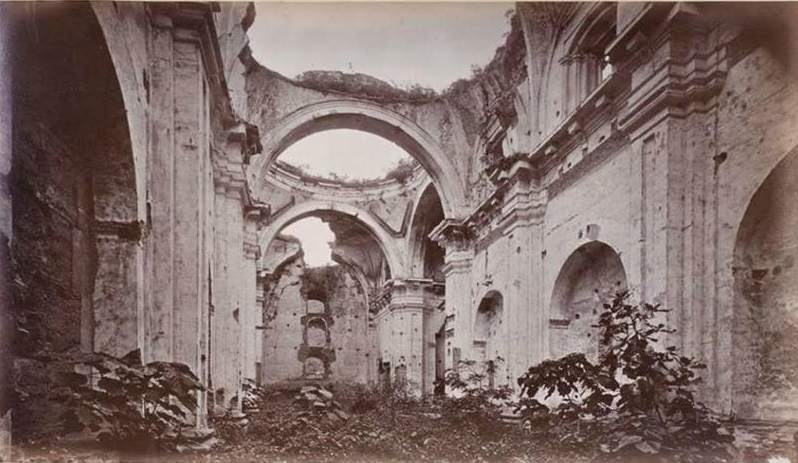
San Francisco church ruins in 1875; the Green Goddess temple scenes were filmed at this location in 1935. Photograph by Eadweard Muybridge.

The places where the filming took place were:

- Chichicastenango: scenes of a native town where the explorers first met.
- Antigua Guatemala: The Green Goddess temple in the abandoned Spanish city, filmed at the ruins of San Francisco Church.
- Livingston: scenes where explorers prepare to go into the jungle
- Puerto Barrios: arrival and departure of the boats carrying the explorers
- Tikal: jungle scenes
- Quiriguá: Mayan city where they get lectured on the Maya civilization
- Guatemala City: then-luxurious Palace Hotel was used to shoot the scenes of the hotel in the imaginary town of At Mantique

Scenes were also shot at Jungleland USA in Thousand Oaks, California.

=== Problems ===
While in Guatemala in 1933 troubleshooting for RKO, Ashton Dearholt met and fell in love with a young swimmer whom he hired as the serial's lead actress. She was named Florence Watson, but he rechristened her Ula Holt. He brought her back to Los Angeles with him and installed her in the Dearholt household. Dearholt's wife, Florence Gilbert, left with their two children and eventually filed for divorce shortly before the expedition's departure. While filming, Edgar Rice Burroughs divorced his wife Emma Hulbert and married Florence Gilbert, 30 years his junior, on 4 April 1935, after which they escaped to Hawaii for their honeymoon. He would write in his personal diary that he had fallen in love with Florence when she accompanied Dearholt to his first meeting with Burroughs in 1929.

Burroughs decided that he needed immediate money and that Burroughs-Tarzan Enterprises was not going to make it for him after all. He reoptioned MGM's contract for a third Weissmuller film and approved the sale of three of Sol Lesser's remaining four options to MGM, who agreed to make a large "authorisation payment" to Burroughs. (Sol Lesser had acquired options for five Tarzan productions from a defunct company, the first of which he used to make Tarzan the Fearless in direct competition with MGM's films.) MGM paid Lesser $500,000 for his options and paid Burroughs $25–50,000 per film.

Most modern reference sources allege that MGM campaigned to undermine their new film rival by threatening that theaters showing the Dearholt serial would not be allowed to show the third MGM film when it was released. However, no reference to such a campaign can be found in any primary contemporary resources, including Variety, The Film Daily, The Motion Picture Exhibitor or even the New York Times, all of which reviewed the film and covered its filming progress; and modern sources, which have relied heavily on pressbook material and rank assumptions by each other for other aspects of the serial's "history", do not provide any reference source for this allegation.

Burroughs-Tarzan Enterprises tried to make its serial more lucrative by releasing it in two different formats. The first involved having the first episode with a 65-minute running time and encouraging theater owners to book it as the "feature" film on a program with the last episode of a previous serial, with the remaining eleven episodes to follow; and the second was by creating a 70-minute feature film from the first episode and its cliffhanger resolution in the second chapter, plus a brief sequence showing the capture of Raglan, which could either be booked also as a longer first episode (to be followed by the remaining eleven) or as a stand-alone feature. Reports of use of yet another first episode being cut and played against seven subsequent episodes cannot be verified. In any event, this plan was not successful in the USA. New Adventures of Tarzan was the last Tarzan serial ever produced. However, the serial did much better abroad, especially in England, where it was re-released following World War II with its first episode shortened to 45 minutes and its two feature versions also edited, all at the hands of E. J. Fancey's New Realm Pictures, Ltd. These truncated versions later became staples of U.S. television and even later videotape and DVA printings, to the extent that the original editions may be considered lost, at least to the general public: even the "restored" version issued in 2019 on DVD by The Roan Group has only the abridged first episode. Only one Beta videotape of the serial, marketed in the 1980s by Nostalgia Family Merchant, is known to have included the complete first episode.

Fancey also dubbed or redubbed the first feature version, the poor quality of which he excused by adding an "apology" to the credits that claimed the problem was due to "variable atmospheric conditions" in Guatemala which had affected the original recording. In fact, the original release material contains no such apology, and prints made from the original material have an adequate soundtrack.

=== Tarzan's Yell ===
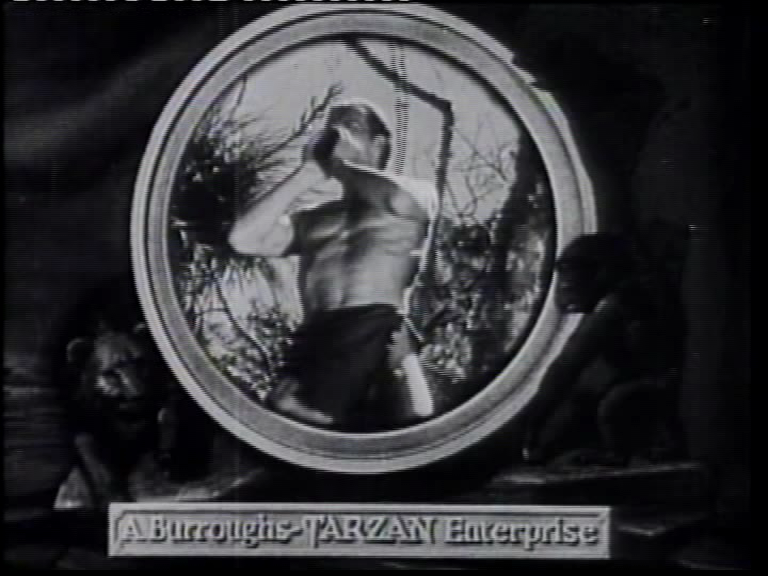
Herman Brix posing for the Tarzan yell in the opening credits of the serial

This serial features an alternate version of the famous Tarzan yell. This version is variously described as a rising pitch "Man-gan-i" or "Tar-man-gan-i" sound. The "Tar-man-gan-i" version originally comes from the 1932 Tarzan radio serial starring James Pierce. In the ape language used in the Burroughs' Tarzan novels, "Tarmangani" means "Great White Ape". MGM's Johnny Weissmuller films, featuring the now standard yell, had been in production for some time when this serial was created, starting with Tarzan the Ape Man (1932).The original version of the plot involved munitions runners and government agents, focussing more on the super-explosive formula hidden in the idol. This was rewritten during production, but some elements remain, such as the otherwise nonsensical final chapter name "Operator No. 17" (Ula Vale was originally written as a government agent using "Operator No. 17" as her code name, but this entire plot line was dropped from the final script).

=== Stunts and effects ===
Brix performed his own stunts in the serial, including swinging from real jungle vines, but this presented further problems. Despite testing a vine for safety beforehand with a 200 lb weight, when Brix tried himself, with a run up, he overshot the pool of water he was meant to land in. "I still have the scars from that fall," he told the Monitor. The scene where Brix bursts the ropes binding him is real.

== Critical reception ==
Reviews in the United States were poor. There may have been suspicions that this was due to MGM's influence over the trade media, but with the low budget, major financial difficulties, and problems with the Guatemalan government while on location, it may just have been its fate as an independent picture. Variety, for example, said that "limpid direction makes it fall way short of even the limited possibilities of an independent production." The Motion Picture Herald, however, described is as "spectacular and authentic." The film was more of a success outside the United States, possibly due to MGM's lack of control in those markets. According to Gabe Essoe, "on the strength of the one picture alone, Brix became twentieth in popularity in France and Britain."

Despite its problems, the film was successful enough that a second feature film, Tarzan and the Green Goddess, was released in 1938. It was based on footage from the last ten chapters of the serial, with some minor additions, and follows much the same plot. William C. Cline believes The New Adventures of Tarzan to be the best of the Tarzan serials.

== Chapter titles ==
1. The New Adventures of Tarzan
2. Crossed Trails
3. The Devil's Noose
4. River Perils
5. Unseen Hands
6. Fatal Fangs
7. Flaming Waters
8. Angry Gods
9. Doom's Brink
10. Secret Signals
11. Death's Fireworks
12. Operator No. 17 -- Re-Cap Chapter

_{Source:}

== See also ==
- List of film serials
- List of film serials by studio
- List of films in the public domain in the United States
