= Los Angeles Pet Memorial Park =

Pet cemetery in California, United States

The Los Angeles Pet Memorial Park, formerly called the Los Angeles Pet Cemetery, is a 10 acre pet cemetery located in Calabasas, California, United States.

== History ==
The Los Angeles Memorial Pet Park was founded in 1928 by veterinarian Eugene Jones, and was originally 15 acres. In 1973, Jones's family donated the site to the Los Angeles branch of the American Society for the Prevention of Cruelty to Animals (ASPCA). The Los Angeles ASPCA then sold five acres of the land to real estate developers, which caused owners of pets buried there to advocate for maintaining the site's integrity. In 1986, the site was afforded the same legal status as a human cemetery and development of the land is permanently illegal, one of the few pet cemeteries in the USA to have such a status.

== Notable burials ==
- Pete the Pup
- Emily the Beagle - CBS Inside Edition Famous Driving Beagle
- Jiggs (chimpanzee)
- Room 8 (a cat)
- Tawny the Lion
- Russell The Rabbit
- Kabar – Dog of Rudolph Valentino
