= Room 8 =

School cat from Echo Park, California, United States

- Species: Cat
- Breed: Domestic short-hair
- Sex: Male
- Born: 1947; Elysian Heights, Los Angeles, California, United States
- Died: August 13, 1968 (aged 21); Lockhart Animal Hospital, Hollywood, Los Angeles, California, United States
- Resting place: Los Angeles Pet Memorial Park (Calabasas)
- Occupation: School Mascot
- Owners: Elysian Heights Elementary School
- Named after: His favorite classroom at the school
- explorehistoricalif.com/ehc_legacy/room8.html

Room 8 (c. 1947 – August 13, 1968) was a cat who became a celebrity for attending Elysian Heights Elementary School in the Echo Park neighborhood of Los Angeles. He wandered in through a window in 1952 and quickly made himself at home in Room 8, where he joined class for the next 16 years. Room 8 vanished each summer and reappeared in the fall when students returned, a routine he kept up until the mid-1960s.

== Background ==
In the 1960s, Room 8 became world famous. Beverly Mason, the school principal, said in a 1968 newspaper story: "He disappeared all summer, but the minute school started, the day the first bell rang, down the street he'd come. On the first day of school, every newspaper and television station in town showed up at the crack of dawn to watch this cat appear from out of the hills."

Room 8 received as many as 100 letters a day with some addressed simply to "The Cat. Los Angeles." Student "secretaries" helped fellow students reply to the fan mail. Eventually a local woman revealed that Room 8 was probably her cat originally until a boarder threw rocks at him and chased him away. The cat was featured in a documentary called Big Cat, Little Cat and a children's book, A Cat Called Room 8. Look magazine ran a three-page Room 8 feature by photographer Richard Hewett in November 1962, titled "Room 8: The School Cat." Leo Kottke wrote an instrumental called "Room 8" that was included in his 1971 album, Mudlark.

Room 8 enjoyed when students read books to him and often slept on their desks. Eventually, he was injured in a fight with another cat, and, as he aged, he developed feline pneumonia. A family near the school adopted him, and when he had difficulty walking the distance between his home, the school janitor carried him across the street each day after classes were done.

== Death and legacy ==
Room 8 died in 1968 after attending school for 15 years, longer than most humans. His obituary in the Los Angeles Times rivaled that of major political figures, running three columns with a photograph. The cat was so famous that his obituary ran in papers as far away as Hartford, Connecticut.

Students were overwhelmed with the response to a fundraiser for Room 8's burial. The campaign received enough money to give Room 8 one of the largest gravestones at the Los Angeles Pet Memorial Park. Historian Paul Koudounaris said: "The whole history of Hollywood celebrities has their pets in that cemetery ... yet that cat, that homeless cat who adopted a school has a bigger memorial than any of them. And to this day, his grave is still the most visited."

The cat's fans held a campaign to place him on a U.S. postage stamp. Elysian Heights Elementary School has a wall mural on the outside of the school that features Room 8, and the teachers read his book to each new class. Room 8's paw prints are also displayed in cement on the sidewalk outside the school. In 1972, a cat shelter was started in his name called The Room 8 Memorial Foundation.

== See also ==
- List of individual cats
- List of wild animals from Los Angeles
