= Her Jungle Love =

1938 film

- Film poster
- Directed by: George Archainbaud
- Screenplay by: Joseph Moncure March; Lillie Hayward; Eddie Weich
- Story by: Gerald Geraghty; Curt Siodmak
- Produced by: George M. Arthur
- Starring: Dorothy Lamour; Ray Milland; Lynne Overman
- Cinematography: Ray Rennahan
- Edited by: Hugh Bennett
- Music by: Gregory Stone
- Color process: Technicolor
- Production company: Paramount Pictures
- Distributed by: Paramount Pictures
- Release date: April 15, 1938 (United States)
- Running time: 81 minutes
- Country: United States
- Language: English

Her Jungle Love is a 1938 American South Seas adventure film directed by George Archainbaud and starring Dorothy Lamour and Ray Milland. Portions of the film were shot at Palm Springs, California.

== Plot ==
Two pilots (Ray Milland, Lynne Overman) on a rescue mission meet a white jungle girl (Dorothy Lamour) in the South Seas.

== Cast ==
- Dorothy Lamour as Tura
- Ray Milland as Bob Mitchell
- Lynne Overman as Jimmy Wallace
- J. Carrol Naish as Kuasa
- Virginia Vale as Eleanor Martin (as Dorothy Howe)
- Jonathan Hale as J.C. Martin
- Archie Twitchell as Roy Atkins
- Jiggs (chimpanzee) as Gaga
