= Captain Gallant of the Foreign Legion =

1950s American TV series

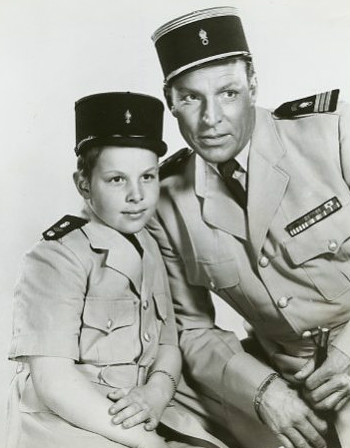
- Buster Crabbe with real life son Cullen
- Also known as: Foreign Legionnaire
- Genre: Adventure
- Directed by: Lester Fuller
- Starring: Buster Crabbe; Fuzzy Knight; Cullen Crabbe
- Country of origin: United States
- Original language: English
- No. of seasons: 2
- No. of episodes: 65

Production
- Production locations: Agadir, Morocco
- Running time: 30 minutes

Original release
- Network: NBC
- Release: 13 February 1955 – 7 December 1957

Captain Gallant of the Foreign Legion is an American half-hour black-and-white television series about the French Foreign Legion starring Buster Crabbe in the title role. Crabbe's real-life son Cullen Crabbe played the Legion mascot, with cowboy sidekick Fuzzy Knight playing himself as the captain's comic orderly. The series went into production in late 1953.

The series premiered on NBC on February 13, 1955 and ended its first run with the 65th episode shown on December 7, 1957. Five years later NBC returned the series to the network as a Saturday late-afternoon offering, beginning September 29, 1962.

It was shown for many years in syndication on American television under the title Foreign Legionnaire.

== Production ==
The first season of the television show was filmed on location in North Africa with many actual Legionnaires and their installations featured in the show. With increased danger to the crew, the series moved to Italy. The studio was owned by Sophia Loren and was just outside the gates of the US Army base, Camp Darby, near Pisa.

One of the producers of the show was Harry Saltzman. The executive producer was Gilbert A. Ralston. Directors were Marcel Cravenne, Sam Newfield, Pierre Schwab, and Jean Yarbrough. Writers were Jack Andrews, Gene Levitt, and William N. Robson.

According to the book biography of Buster Crabbe's longtime director Sam Newfield, "Asked who he'd like for a sidekick in the series, Crabbe immediately thought of his good friend and longtime sidekick Al "Fuzzy" St. John. So he requested Fuzzy. His hopes were dashed when he found that they had hired Fuzzy Knight instead, thinking that he was the 'Fuzzy' that Crabbe had asked for."

Three episodes were spliced together as a film released in the United Kingdom called Desert Outpost (1954) directed by Sam Newfield.

== Tie-ins ==
- Four issues of an American comic book published by Charlton Comics, intended as a promotion by the H. J. Heinz Company.
- A playset by Louis Marx and Company containing a metal fort, palm trees, tents, and accessories, and figures of Buster and Cullen Crabbe as well as Legionnaires and Arab figures.
- The Captain Gallant Adventure Game was a 1955 board game.
