= Alien Dead =

Film by Fred Olen Ray

- VHS cover art
- Directed by: Fred Olen Ray
- Screenplay by: Martin Alan Nicholas; Fred Olen Ray
- Produced by: Fred Olen Ray; Chuck Sumner
- Starring: Buster Crabbe; Linda Lewis
- Cinematography: Fred Olen Ray
- Edited by: Mark Barrett
- Music by: Franklin Sledge; Chuck Sumner
- Production company: Firebird Pictures Production
- Release date: 1983 (United Kingdom)
- Running time: 87 minutes
- Country: United States
- Language: English

Alien Dead is an American science fiction horror film directed by Fred Olen Ray. Ray co-wrote the script with Martin Nicholas. The film involves a meteor hitting a houseboat, which causes the people on board to become zombies who eat alligators and eventually people.

The film was one of the last films featuring actor Buster Crabbe among a cast of unknowns. It was filmed in 1980 and released to home video in 1985. Reviews from Variety, Kim Newman and other retrospective horror guides have been negative, noting low budget and bad acting.

== Plot ==
A meteor strikes a houseboat in the swamps near a southern town. The people on the houseboat become zombies who feed on the alligators in the swamp. Once they run out of alligators, they start going for the citizens. A local scientist tries to figure out what is happening to people once they start disappearing.

== Cast ==
- Buster Crabbe as Sheriff Kowalski
- Linda Lewis as Shawn Michaels
- Raymond Roberts as Tom Corman (credited as Ray Roberts)
- George Kelsey as Emmet Michaels
- Mike Bonavia as Miller Haze
- Dennis Underwood as Deputy Campbell
- John Leinier as Paisley
- Rich Vogan as Krelboin
- Martin Nicholas as "Doc" Ellerbee (credited as Martin Alan Nicholas)
- Norman Riggins as Mr. Griffith
- Nancy Kranz as Mrs. Griffith
- Shelley Youngren as Angry Wife
- Wesley T. Place as Deputy

== Production ==
Alien Dead was made in Florida in 1980 for $12,000. Buster Crabbe was paid $2,000 for his role in the film, one-third less than his salary for the 1945 Western Prairie Rustlers. The film was initially being filmed as It Fell from the Sky based on a script written by Marin Nicholas and the director, which was originally titled Swamp of the Blood Leeches. When the writers realized they couldn't afford leech costumes, they re-wrote the script into being about human zombies.

== Release ==
According to director Fred Olen Ray, "everything about this no-budget movie was awful." and that the film had "languished about, unsold until 1982" and that by 1991 the film had "released in the United States on no less than five different video labels." The film was released on home video in the United Kingdom by 1983.

The film went direct-to-video in 1985. The film has been released on VHS by both Academy Home Entertainment and Genesis Home Video with an 87-minute running time.

== Reception ==
Variety reviewed the VHS release of the film, declaring it "an amateurish monster film".

Steven Puchalski describes the film a "third rate Night of the Living Dead" with laughable effects, though he calls it "eminently watchable for schlock fanatics". In a negative review, David Johnson of DVD Verdict states that the gore is sparse and the story boring. Kim Newman referred to the film as "cheap" and "unwatchable" and described it as part of a trend of "films made by rabid fans of Famous Monsters of Filmland" who "wind up choking on their own in-references and third-hand plots" and were stuck on "cutesy ideas like giving all the characters the names of Roger Corman 1950s repertory company".

== Footnotes ==
=== References ===
- Albright, Brian (2012). Regional Horror Films, 1958-1990. McFarland & Company, Inc. ISBN 978-0-7864-7227-7.
- Newman, Kim (2011). Nightmare Movies: Horror on Screen Since the 1960s [Revised Edition]. Bloomsbury Publishing. ISBN 978-1408817506.
- Ray, Fred Olen (1991). The New Poverty Row. McFarland & Company. ISBN 0-89950-628-3.
- Stine, Scott Aaron (2001). The Gorehound's Guide to Splatter Films of the 1960s and 1970s. McFarland. ISBN 078649140X.
- Vermilye, Jerry (2014). Buster Crabbe: a Biofilmography. McFarland. ISBN 978-0786451807.
