= Dirty Work (1933 film) =

1933 film

- Directed by: Lloyd French
- Written by: H.M. Walker
- Produced by: Hal Roach
- Starring: Stan Laurel; Oliver Hardy; Lucien Littlefield; Samuel Adams
- Cinematography: Kenneth Peach
- Edited by: Bert Jordan
- Music by: Marvin Hatley; Leroy Shield
- Distributed by: Metro-Goldwyn-Mayer
- Release date: November 25, 1933
- Running time: 19:23
- Countries: United States; United Kingdom; Canada
- Language: English

Dirty Work is a Pre-Code Laurel and Hardy short film classic comedy made in 1933. It was directed by Lloyd French, produced by Hal Roach and distributed by MGM.

== Plot ==
Deranged scientist Professor Noodle is engrossed in developing a rejuvenation elixir for over two decades, purportedly capable of reversing the aging process. Stan and Ollie, employed as chimney sweeps, enter the scene, assigned to cleanse the estate's chimney. As Oliver ascends to the rooftop, Stan, stationed below, inadvertently propels the sweep upwards, causing Oliver to tumble through the skylight. Following an arduous exchange, Stan eventually joins Ollie atop the roof, albeit mishandling the apparatus, causing a disruption in the chimney's extension. Subsequently, resorting to a rifle for assistance, Stan nearly endangers Ollie's life in a botched attempt.

In a series of calamitous events, Stan's clumsiness results in Ollie's fall from the rooftop, damaging property and inciting chaos within the household. Amidst the tumult, Noodle endeavors to demonstrate his rejuvenation solution, commencing with the transformation of a duck into a duckling through a solitary drop of his concoction, administered using an eye-dropper.

While Noodle goes to fetch his butler Jessup, who will be the first human test subject, Stan and Oliver encounter an opportunity, and clandestinely endeavor to experiment with the solution using a fish. However, this leads to a catastrophe as Stan accidentally bumps into Ollie, who is perched atop a stepladder, and he plunges into the vat with the entire solution container.

The ensuing pandemonium witnesses Ollie's transformation into a chimpanzee, who retains Ollie's derby. Despite his de-evolution into a primal state, Ollie's recalcitrance remains unchanged as he tells Stan, just as he had done earlier: "I have nothing to say."

== Cast ==
- Stan Laurel as Stan
- Oliver Hardy as Ollie
- Lucien Littlefield as Professor Noodle (uncredited)
- Samuel Adams as Jessup the Butler (uncredited)
- Jiggs the Chimp as De-evolved Ollie (uncredited)
