= Buster Crabbe =

American swimmer, Olympic gold medalist, actor (1908–1983)

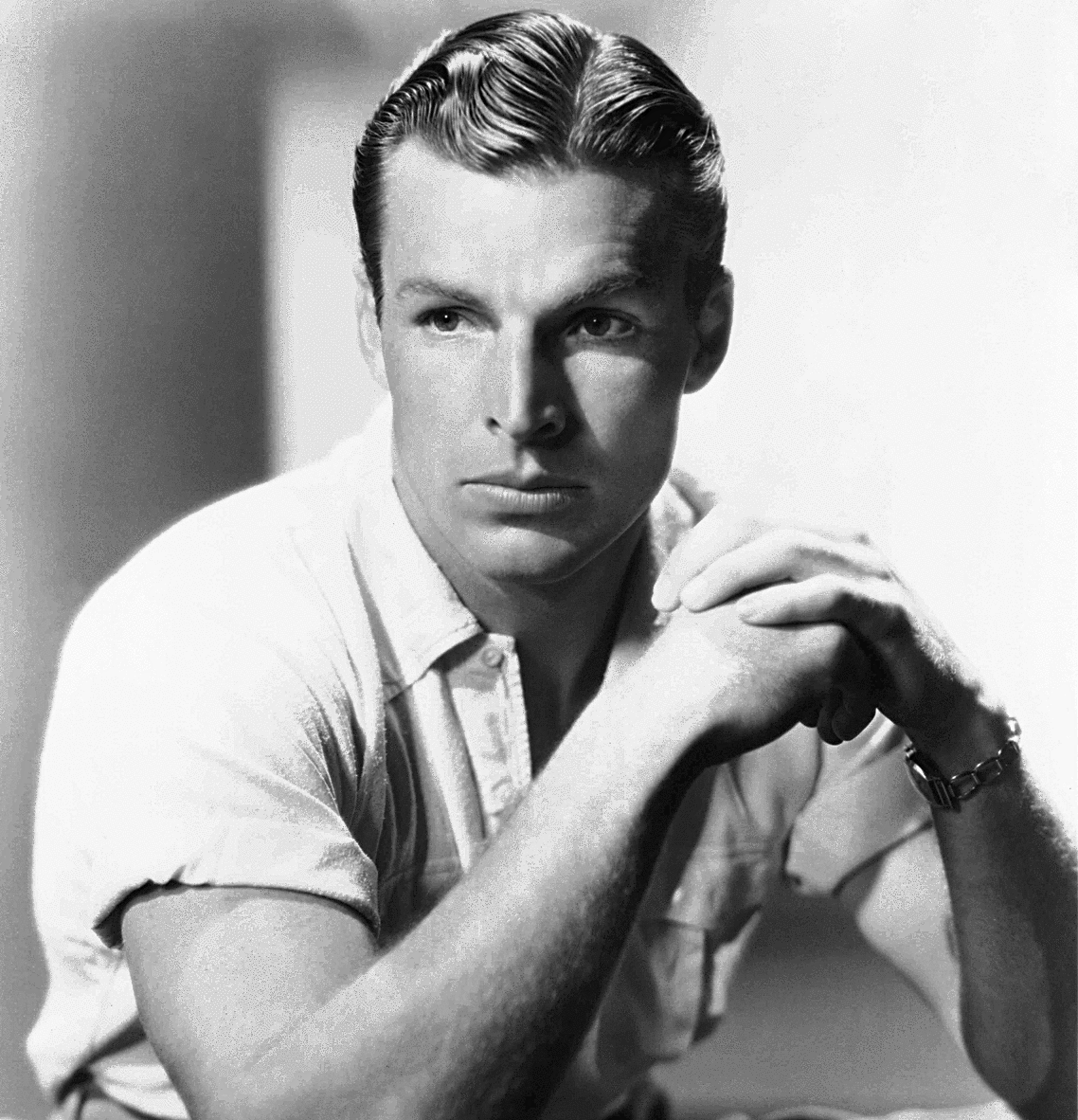
- Crabbe, c. early 1940s
- Born: Clarence Linden Crabbe II; February 7, 1908; Oakland, California, U.S.
- Died: April 23, 1983 (aged 75); Scottsdale, Arizona, U.S.
- Burial place: Green Acres Memorial Park, Scottsdale, Arizona
- Education: University of Southern California
- Occupations: Actor; stuntman; swimmer; stockbroker
- Years active: 1930–1983
- Known for: Flash Gordon; Buck Rogers; Tarzan the Fearless; Daughter of Shanghai
- Spouse: Adah Virginia Held (m. 1933)
- Children: 3
- Relatives: Nick Holt (grandson)

Clarence Linden "Buster" Crabbe II (/ˈkræb/; February 7, 1908 – April 23, 1983) was an American two-time Olympic swimmer and film and television actor. He won the 1932 Olympic gold medal for 400-metre freestyle swimming event, which launched his career on the silver screen and later television. He starred in a variety of popular feature films and movie serials released between 1933 and the 1950s, portraying the top three syndicated comic-strip heroes of the 1930s: Tarzan, Flash Gordon, and Buck Rogers.

== Early life ==
Crabbe was born February 7, 1908, to Edward Clinton Simmons Crabbe, a real estate broker, and Lucy Agnes (née McNamara) Crabbe, in Oakland, California. He had a brother, Edward Clinton Simmons Crabbe Jr. (1909–1972). Crabbe grew up in Hawaii and graduated from Punahou School in Honolulu. He then attended the University of Southern California, where he was the school's first All-American swimmer (1931) and a 1931 NCAA freestyle titlist. He also became a member of the Sigma Chi fraternity before graduating from USC in 1931.

== Olympic Games ==
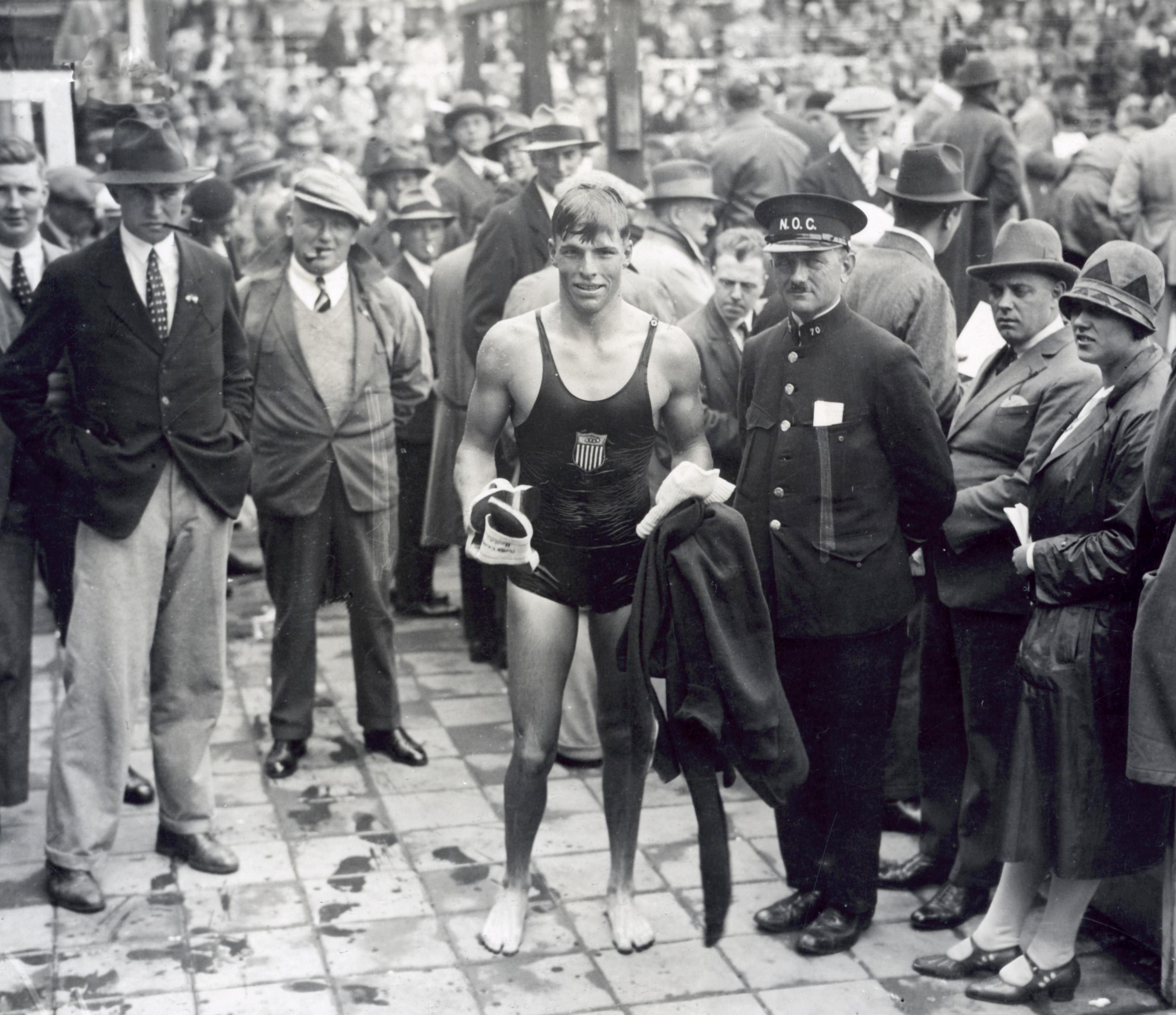
Crabbe at age 20 at the 1928 Olympics in Amsterdam

Olympic medal record

Representing the United States

Men's swimming
Gold medal – first place	1932 Los Angeles	400 m freestyle
Bronze medal – third place	1928 Amsterdam	1500 m freestyle

Crabbe competed in two Olympic Games as a swimmer. At the 1928 Summer Olympics in Amsterdam, he won the bronze medal for the 1,500 metres freestyle, and at the 1932 Summer Olympics in Los Angeles, he won the gold medal for the 400 metres freestyle when he beat Jean Taris of France by a tenth of a second.

== Acting career ==
=== Hollywood ===
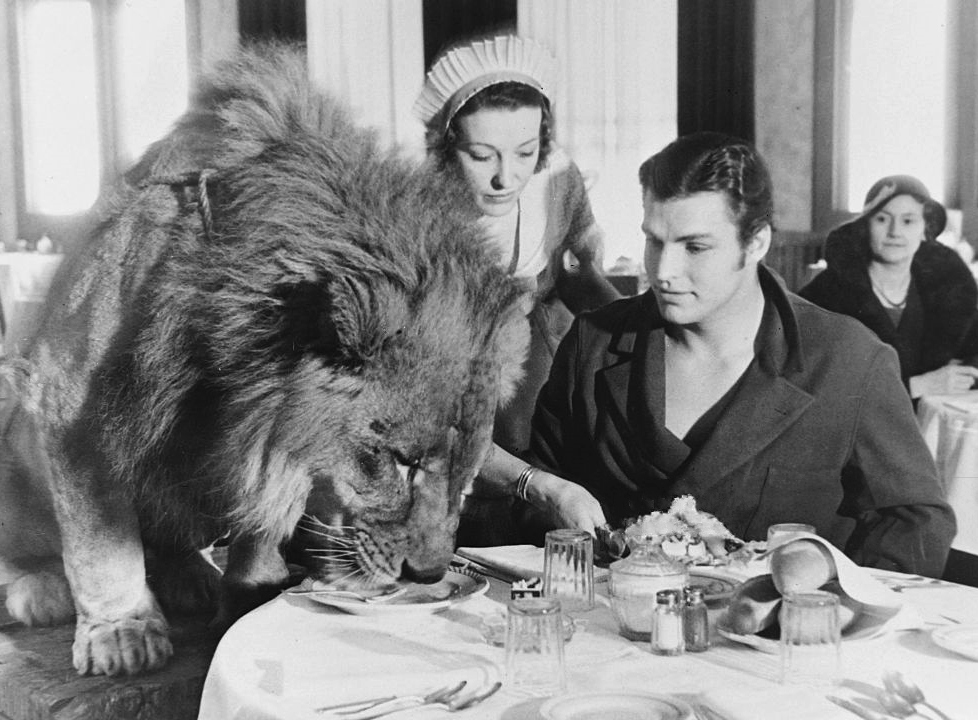
Crabbe watches "Jack", one of the lions in King of the Jungle, eating lunch in a Hollywood restaurant in 1933. Crabbe became a lion tamer while working on that adventure film.

He is credited in some films as "Larry Crabbe" or "Larry (Buster) Crabbe". His role in the Tarzan serial Tarzan the Fearless (1933) began a career in which Crabbe starred in more than a hundred films. In King of the Jungle (1933), Jungle Man (1941), and the serial King of the Congo (1952), he played typical "jungle man" roles. He starred in several popular films at this time, including The Sweetheart of Sigma Chi (1933), alongside Betty Grable, Search for Beauty (1934), and Daughter of Shanghai (1937) credited as Larry Crabbe.

In 1936, he was selected over several stars to play Flash Gordon in the first, very successful Universal Pictures Flash Gordon serial, which was followed by two sequels released in 1938 and 1940. The series was later edited and shown extensively on American television during the 1950s and 1960s, then fully restored for home video release. He also starred as Buck Rogers for Universal, playing the role with dark hair, unlike his blonde hair for Flash Gordon. In 1939 Crabbe reunited with Grable for a lead role in the mainstream comedy Million Dollar Legs.

Crabbe starred at the Billy Rose's Aquacade at the New York World's Fair during its second year (1940), replacing fellow Olympic swimmer and Tarzan actor Johnny Weissmuller. In 1943, Al Sheehan recruited Crabbe to perform as part of the Aqua Follies, a water ballet show including diving acts.

During World War II, Crabbe was put under contract by Producers Releasing Corporation for lead roles from 1942 to 1946. He portrayed a Western folk-hero version of Billy the Kid in 13 films, and Billy Carson in 23, along with Al St. John as his sidekick. As a 34-year-old married man, Crabbe had a draft deferment, but made Army training films for the field artillery at Ft. Sill, Oklahoma, along with St. John. Crabbe also played some jungle roles for the studio.

Following the war, Crabbe appeared opposite Weissmuller as a rival in two jungle films, Swamp Fire (1946) and Captive Girl (1950). For his final multi-chapter movie serial, Crabbe returned to the jungle playing the role of Thun'da in King of the Congo (1952).

=== Television ===
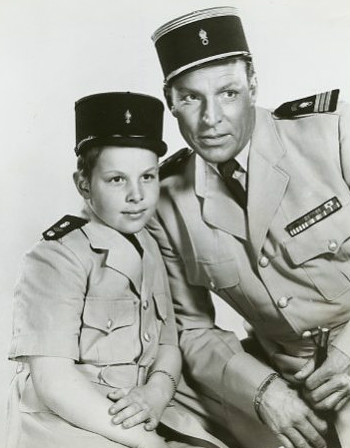
Buster Crabbe with real-life son Cullen on Captain Gallant of the Foreign Legion, ca. 1955

Crabbe was frequently featured in archival footage in the children's television program, The Gabby Hayes Show. Prior to his playing "Captain Gallant", Crabbe had hosted the local New York City-based children's film wraparound television series, The Buster Crabbe Show. It was set against the backdrop of a ranch foreman's bunk house and featured Crabbe engaging his viewers with games, stories, craftmaking, hobbies, informational segments, and interviews with guest performers and personalities. This was in-between the reruns of old movie serials, westerns, and comedies. The Buster Crabbe Show was seen weekday evenings on WOR-TV (Channel 9) in New York City from Monday, March 12, 1951, to Friday, October 3, 1952. The series name was changed to Buster's Buddies! and returned to the NYC airways on WJZ-TV (Channel 7) (now WABC) on Monday, September 21, 1953. The WJZ TV version of the series included a studio audience of kids, becoming more of a kids' variety show. Despite the addition of the studio audience and Crabbe's personality, Buster's Buddies! was not a hit, and it was canceled on Friday, March 26, 1954.

On September 28, 1952, Sports Final with Buster Crabbe debuted on WNBT-TV in New York City. Crabbe gave updates sports news from 11:15 to 11:20 p.m. Eastern Time on Sundays.

Crabbe starred in the syndicated television series, Captain Gallant of the Foreign Legion (1955 to 1957) as Captain Michael Gallant; the adventure series aired on NBC. His real-life son, Cullen Crabbe, appeared in the series as the character "Cuffy Sanders".

Crabbe made regular television appearances, including an episode of the 1979 series Buck Rogers in the 25th Century, in which he played a retired fighter pilot named "Brigadier Gordon", in honor of Flash Gordon. When Rogers (Gil Gerard) praises his flying, Gordon replies "I've been doing that sort of thing since before you were born", not realizing Buck was actually born over 500 years earlier. (Indeed, Crabbe first played Buck Rogers in 1939, six years before Gerard's birth.) Rogers responds "You think so?" to which Gordon replies "Young man, I know so!"

He was also in a TV spot for Continental Airlines, where Crabbe spies himself in an old Flash Gordon short being shown on board: "I think I know that guy. He used to be my idol."

== Later years ==
Crabbe's Hollywood career waned somewhat in the 1950s and 1960s, and he became a stockbroker and businessman during this period. According to David Ragan's Movie Stars of the '30s, Crabbe owned a Southern California swimming pool-building company in later years. In the mid-1950s, Crabbe purchased the Adirondack campus of the Adirondack-Florida School, which advertised itself as a swim camp, called Camp Meenahga, for boys aged eight to fourteen, with most of the campers coming from Montreal. He was also the aquatics director at the Concord Resort Hotel in New York State's Catskill Mountains.

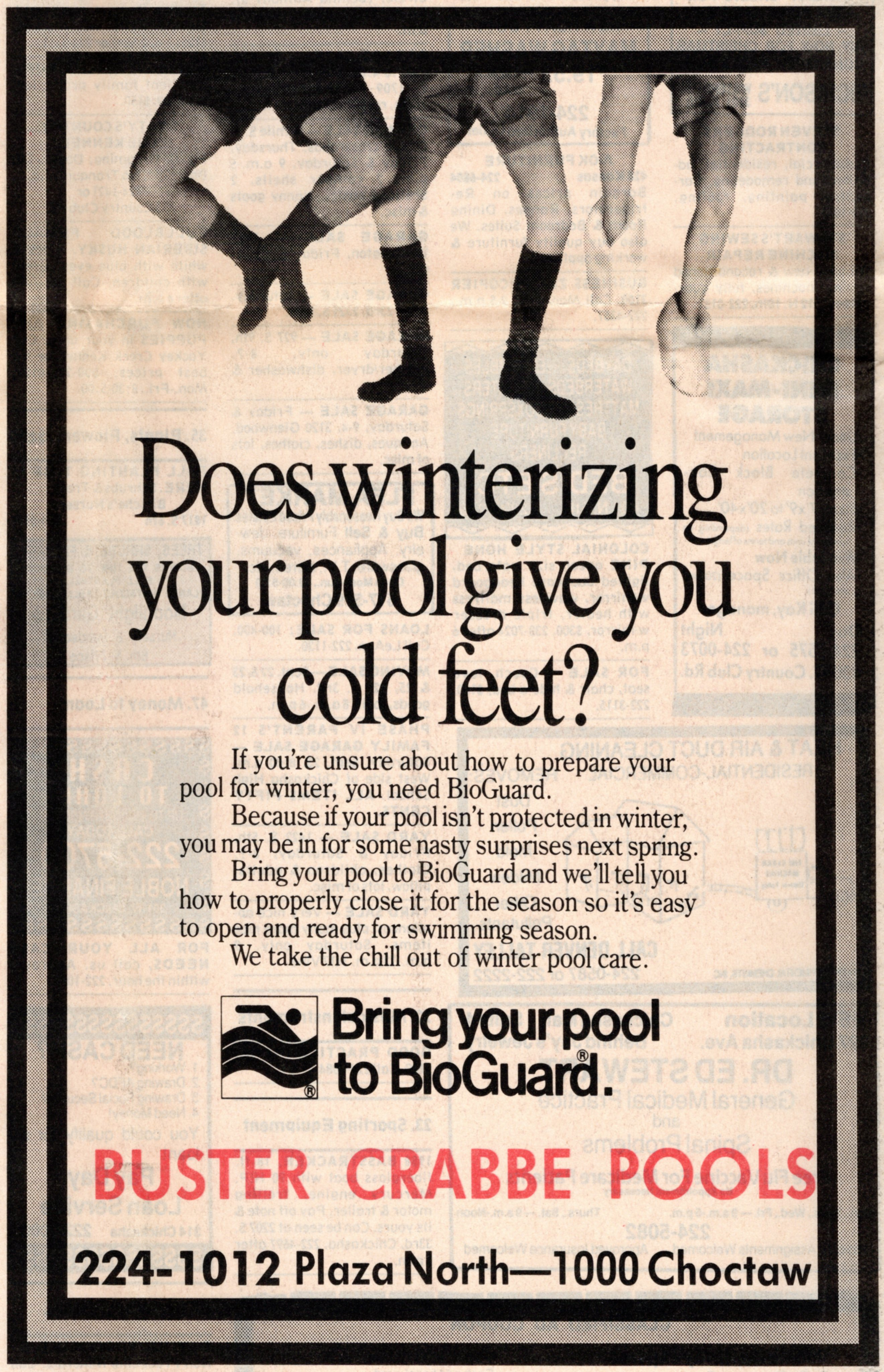
Newspaper ad published September 1989

During this period, Buster joined the swimming pool company Cascade Industries in Edison, New Jersey. In his capacity as Vice President of Sales, promoter, and spokesman for Cascade, "the world's first 'package pool' company", he attended shopping mall openings and fairgrounds, combining the promotion of his swim camps and Cascade's vinyl liner for in-ground swimming pools. A pool line was named after him, and swimming pools were sold by "Buster Crabbe Dealers" throughout the eastern seaboard and southern states from 1952 until 1990.

Though he followed other pursuits, he never stopped acting. But his career in the 1950s, and later, was limited to low-budget films, including westerns such as Gunfighters of Abilene (1960) co-starring Barton MacLane, Arizona Raiders (1965) co-starring Audie Murphy, and The Bounty Killer (1965) co-starring Dan Duryea and Rod Cameron. Crabbe appeared as the father of a young swimmer in the comedy Swim Team (1979), and as a sheriff in the low-budget horror film Alien Dead (1980), followed by The Comeback Trail (1982), one year before his death. Crabbe also appeared in television commercials for Hormel Chili, Icy Hot, and the Magic Mold Bodyshirt, an early version of male shapewear, which purportedly helped in weight loss. Through Icy Hot, he was actively involved in arthritis education. Despite his numerous film and television appearances, he is best remembered today as one of the original cinema action heroes of the 1930s and 1940s.

In the 1950s, two published comic book series were named after him. Eastern Color published 12 issues of Buster Crabbe Comics from 1951 to 1953, followed by Lev Gleason's four issues of The Amazing Adventures of Buster Crabbe in 1954.

In 1965, he was inducted into the International Swimming Hall of Fame. During his senior swimming career, Crabbe set 16 world and 35 national records. He continued swimming through his sixties and in 1971 set a world record in his age group.

== Personal life ==
In 1933, he married Adah Virginia Held (1912–2004) and gave himself a year to make it as an actor. If he did not find employment as an actor in that period, he planned to start law school at the University of Southern California.

Crabbe and his wife had two daughters, Caren Lynn ("Sande") and Susan, and a son, Cullen. In 1957, Sande died of anorexia nervosa aged 20.

He is the maternal grandfather of the college football coach Nick Holt.

== Death ==
In 1983, at age 75, Crabbe died of a heart attack at his home in Scottsdale, Arizona. He is interred at Green Acres Memorial Park in Scottsdale.

== Selected filmography ==
Year	Title	Role
1933	King Of The Jungle	Kaspa
1933	Tarzan the Fearless	Tarzan
1934	Badge of Honor	Bob Gordon
1934	You're Telling Me!	Bob Murchison
1936	Flash Gordon	Flash Gordon
1936	The Arizona Raiders	"Laramie" Nelson
1938	Flash Gordon's Trip to Mars	Flash Gordon
1938	Red Barry	Red Barry
1939	Buck Rogers	Buck Rogers
1940	Flash Gordon Conquers the Universe	Flash Gordon
1941–46	Billy the Kid (film series)	Billy the Kid / Billy Carson
1946	Swamp Fire	Mike Kalavich
1947	Last of the Redmen	Magua
1947	The Sea Hound	Captain Silver
1950	Pirates of the High Seas	Jeff Drake
1952	King of the Congo	Captain Roger Drum and "Thun'da"
1956	Gun Brothers	Chad Santee
1957	The Lawless Eighties	Linc Prescott
1958	Badman's Country	Wyatt Earp
1960	Gunfighters of Abilene	Kip Tanner
1965	Arizona Raiders	Captain Andrews
1965	The Bounty Killer	Mike Clayman
1978	Swim Team	Rock Sands
1980	Alien Dead	Sheriff Kowalski
1982	The Comeback Trail	Duke Montana

== See also ==
- List of Olympic medalists in swimming (men)
- List of University of Southern California people

Preceded by Johnny Weissmuller	Tarzan actor 1933	Succeeded by Herman Brix
New title	Flash Gordon actor 1936 – 1940	Succeeded by Steve Holland
Preceded by John Dillie Jr.	Buck Rogers actor 1939	Succeeded by Earl Hammond
