= Tarzan the Fearless =

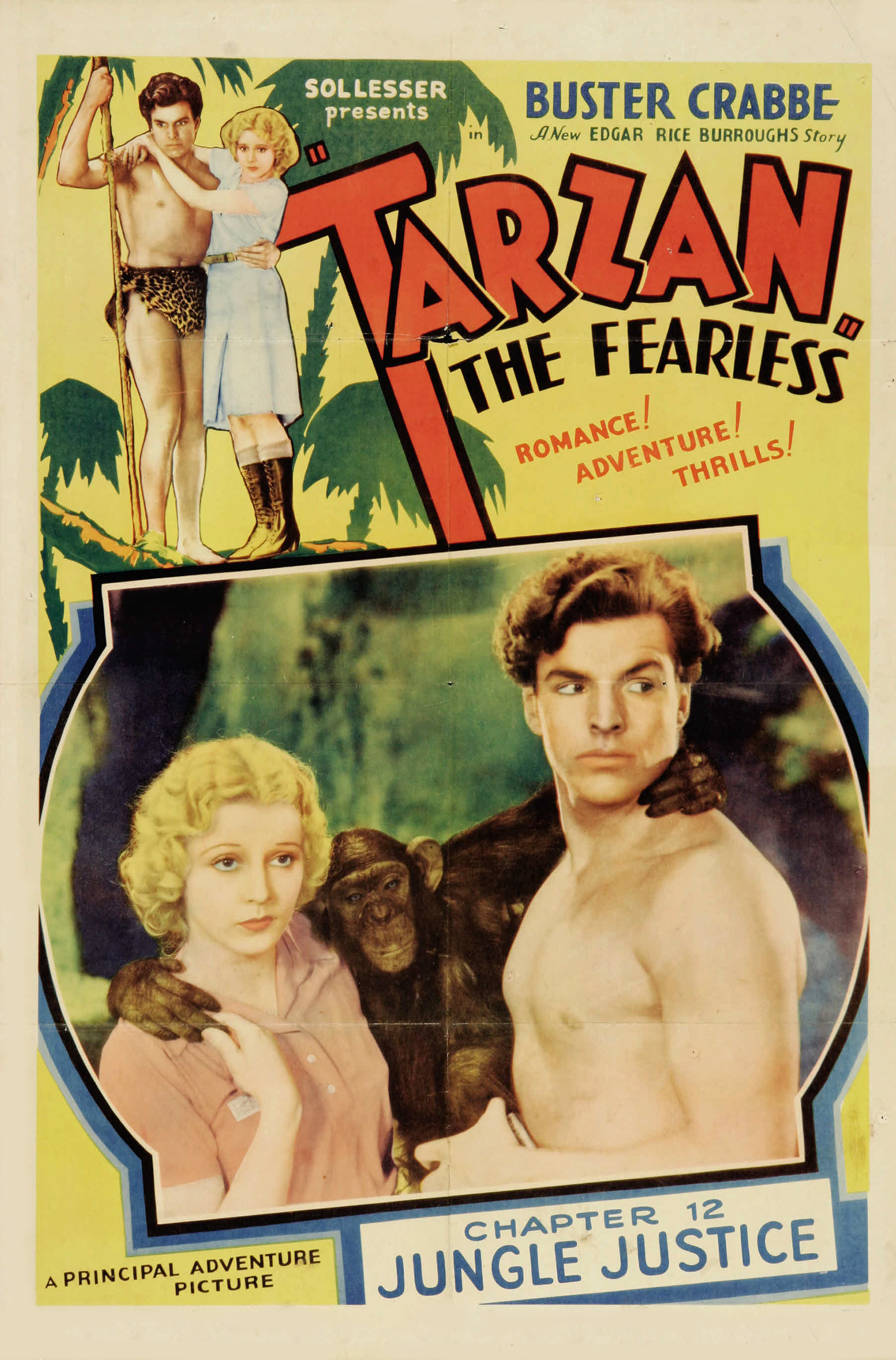
- Poster for episode 12
- Directed by: Robert F. Hill
- Written by: Basil Dickey; George Plympton; Walter Anthony
- Based on: Tarzan of the Apes chatacters in book by Edgar Rice Burroughs
- Produced by: Sol Lesser
- Starring: Buster Crabbe; Jacqueline Wells; E. Alyn Warren; Mischa Auer
- Cinematography: Harry Neumann
- Distributed by: Principal Distributing Corporation
- Release date: August 11, 1933
- Running time: 61 minutes (feature); 12 chapters (serial)
- Country: United States
- Language: English

Tarzan the Fearless is a 12 chapter American Pre-Code film serial starring Buster Crabbe in his only appearance as Tarzan. It was also released as a 61-minute feature film which consisted of the first four chapters edited together, and which was intended to be followed on a weekly basis by the last eight chapters in individual episode format, but which was often exhibited instead as a stand-alone feature film. Actress Jacqueline Wells co-starred; she later changed her name to Julie Bishop. The serial was produced by Sol Lesser, written by Basil Dickey, George Plympton and Walter Anthony (based on the character created by Edgar Rice Burroughs), and directed by Robert F. Hill. The film was released in both formats on August 11, 1933.

== Plot ==
Tarzan is swinging around the trees and enjoying spending time with his chimpanzee friend Cheetah. Suddenly there is a lion below that's about to attack a deer caught in a trap. Tarzan jumps down from the trees with his knife and lands on the lion. The two of them fight while a group of natives watch. Tarzan wins the fight after an intense struggle, destroying the lion. He lets out a massive victory yell and rescues the deer.

Tarzan rescues Dr. Brooks, an elderly scientist, who is held by the followers of Zar, God of the Emerald Fingers, in their lost city. Mary Brooks, his daughter, and Bob Hall have also been searching for him, led by villainous safari guides, Jeff Herbert and Nick Moran.

Tarzan goes in search of Mary and finds her swimming and a Nile crocodile appears and Tarzan dives in to save her, wrestling the monstrous crocodile itself and saving Mary. Tarzan and Mary become interested in each other. Safari guide Jeff is out to kill Tarzan for 10,000 pounds. Soon everyone is captured by the people of Zar and brought before Eltar, their high priest. Bob convinces the high priest to release them by handing over a map. Jeff is killed by Tarzan in a struggle over a gun and Nick is killed by a lion. Mary and her father decide to stay with Tarzan instead of returning to civilization with Bob Hall. The film concludes with Mary trying to teach English to Tarzan inside a Cabin.

== Cast ==
- Buster Crabbe as Tarzan
- Jacqueline Wells as Mary Brooks, a pseudo-Jane character
- E. Alyn Warren as Dr. Brooks, Mary's father. He is entirely based on Professor Porter (Jane's father).
- Mischa Auer as Eltar, High Priest of Zar
- Edward Woods as Bob Hall, friend to Mary and Dr. Brooks
- Philo McCullough as Jeff Herbert, villainous safari guide
- Matthew Betz as Nick Moran, another villainous safari guide

== Production ==
Producer Sol Lesser had acquired the rights to five Tarzan films that Edgar Rice Burroughs had optioned to an independent producer in 1928. That producer went bankrupt and the contract was thought to have lapsed. However, due to the wording of the contract the courts found in Lesser's favour and held that it was still valid. Lesser announced his own Tarzan production a few weeks into the filming of MGM's Tarzan the Ape Man. MGM paid Lesser to delay production until their film was released. Tarzan the Fearless was the first of Sol Lesser's Tarzan productions. Lesser never made another serial with his options, moving to feature films instead. Burroughs had assured MGM that their contract was exclusive, so the rival production was an embarrassment. However, despite their initial problems, Lesser and Burroughs became friends and later worked out a five-picture deal (at one per year).

The "serial was extremely crude" and "almost devoid of music" as well as suffering from poor sound. A score was later taken from old westerns and "minutes passed" with silent (no sound effects, music or dialogue) stock footage of distant animals. The "Tarzan yell" was the James Pierce version, taken from the radio series. The serial was shot under the working title Tarzan the Invincible and was released as Tarzan the Fearless.

=== Casting ===
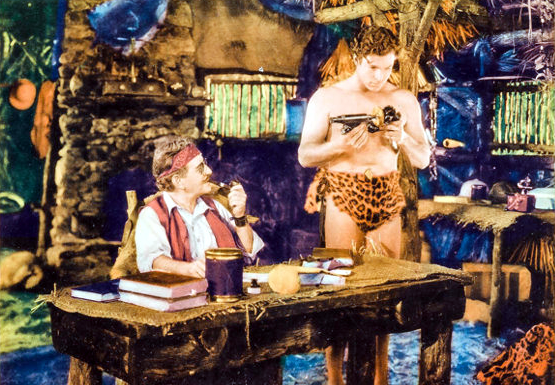
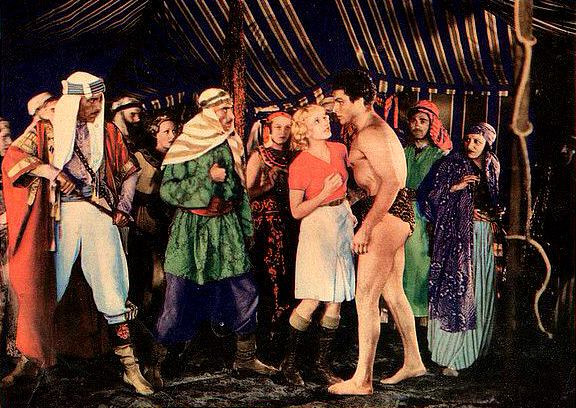
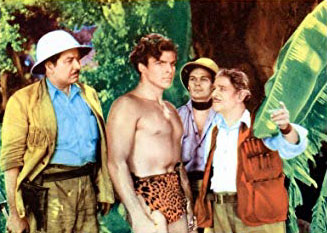
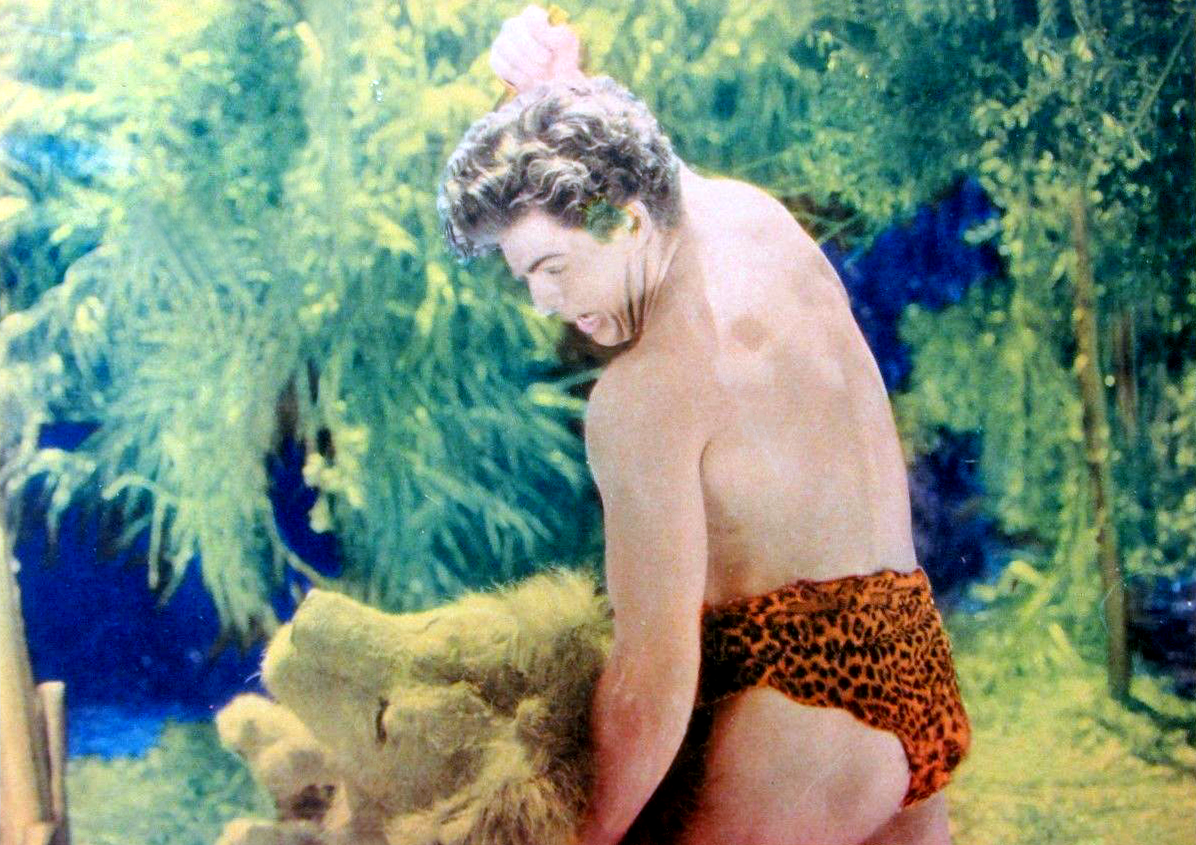
Colored publicity shots from the serial.

Lesser's contract included a clause that Tarzan must be played by "Big Jim" Pierce, Burroughs' son-in-law and the star of Tarzan and the Golden Lion. Pierce had married Joan Burroughs on 8 August 1928 and Edgar Rice Burroughs included the clause in the contract as a wedding present. Lesser wanted a more svelte athlete for the part and was appalled at the thought of casting the large, ex-football player Pierce as Tarzan. He insisted that it would make the film a comedy and hurt the character. Burroughs responded that it was Pierce's choice and that nothing seemed to be able to hurt Tarzan as a character. Lesser actually had a comedy script written by Correy Ford with Jane in the masculine role but he was not happy with it. Instead, Lesser tricked Pierce into giving up the role. He offered him $5,000 and a screen test at MGM to step aside, which Pierce naively accepted. The screen test turned out to be a reading of a Shakespearean soliloquy for which he was not suited. Pierce never worked for MGM.

Lesser wanted an athlete like Johnny Weissmuller to play Tarzan. At this time Paramount released King of the Jungle with Buster Crabbe as Kaspa the Lion Man (a Tarzanesque character), which brought him to Lesser's attention. Like Weissmuller, Crabbe was also an Olympic swimmer, fitting the producer's requirements. Lesser contracted him "on a loan-out from Paramount." Buster Crabbe had actually been tested for the part of Tarzan with MGM in 1931 but, in his own words, "the test wasn't fair." The studio had taken a quick group test during filming of That's My Boy but "didn't give any of us a chance." Crabbe and Weissmuller had been friends for years. However a "rivalry" was heavily publicised, which amused both of them.

Lesser insisted that Crabbe play Tarzan in the same monosyllabic style as Weissmuller. To further increase the connection between the separate productions, Lesser included Cheeta the chimpanzee in the cast. However, to be different from the MGM film, no Jane was written into this serial. Instead, the love interest is Mary Brooks. She is searching for her missing father, Dr Brooks, who has been captured by "worshippers of Zar, god of the Emerald Fingers". This deity is portrayed by the idol from Universal's The Mummy (1932). Julie Bishop (billed as Jacqueline Wells) was hired as Mary Brooks. While an experienced actress at the time, she was yet little known.

== Release ==
=== Theatrical ===
An unusual release strategy was planned by Sol Lesser. The serial was made available in either the traditional twelve-chapter format, or as a feature film to be followed by the serial's final eight chapters. The "feature film", which was 61-minutes long, consisted only of the first four chapters spliced together, so came without any ending to the story; but it was sometimes exhibited as a stand-alone movie, without objection by Lesser's distribution franchise agents. Hence viewers found themselves faced with the villains still on the loose and Tarzan having carried the girl off to his cave, unchaperoned.

An 85-minute true feature film version of the entire serial was also edited by Mascot Pictures, but was only available for exhibition abroad, in countries with limited or no interest in serialized movies. It appeared in the United Kingdom, e.g., also in 1933.

=== Home media ===
The 85-minute feature version became available in the United States via television and, subsequently, 16mm home rental, prints of which eventually found their way to home video in all formats. The serial itself, along with the first-four-chapter feature, is considered lost, although an attempted "reconstruction" - using material in the feature version, recently-found intermittent additional footage from the lost serial, stills, and descriptive inter-titles - became available on DVD in 2016 from the serial fan website "Serial Squadron".

== Critical reception ==
In 1933, many theaters played the 61-minute feature only without the following chapters. This led to a confusing and unsatisfactory experience and the film received bad reviews as a result. William Tray, writing in London's The Nation: "If Mr Burroughs' Tarzan books are not beyond the reach of an eight-year-old mind, the movie versions of them may be said to reduce the age limit by three or four years. In fact, even an intelligent child may find something embarrassing in the manner in which an unfortunate young athlete named Buster Crabbe is required to jump from tree to tree, caress synthetic Hollywood apes, and make hideously inhuman noises."

== Chapter titles ==
1. The Dive of Death
2. The Storm God Strikes
3. Thundering Death
4. The Pit of Peril
5. Blood Money
6. Voodoo Vengeance
7. Caught By Cannibals
8. The Creeping Terror
9. Eyes of Evil
10. The Death Plunge
11. Harvest of Hate
12. Jungle Justice

_{Source:}

== See also ==
- List of film serials
- List of film serials by studio
