= Kaspa =

Kaspa Каспа
- Selo
- Location within Altai Republic Location within Russia
- Coordinates: 51°06′N 86°00′E
- Country: Russia
- Region: Altai Republic
- District: Shebalinsky District
- Time zone: UTC+7:00

Kaspa (Russian: Каспа; Altay: Каспа) is a rural locality (a selo) in Shebalinsky District, the Altai Republic, Russia. The population was 372 as of 2016. There are 5 streets.

== Geography ==
Kaspa is located 42 km southeast of Shebalino (the district's administrative centre) by road. Verkh-Apshuyakhta is the nearest rural locality.
