= King of the Jungle (1933 film) =

1933 film

- Theatrical poster
- Directed by: H. Bruce Humberstone; Max Marcin
- Screenplay by: Charles Thurley Stoneham; Max Marcin; Philip Wylie; Fred Niblo, Jr.
- Starring: Buster Crabbe; Frances Dee; Sidney Toler; Nydia Westman; Robert Barrat; Irving Pichel; Douglass Dumbrille
- Cinematography: Ernest Haller
- Music by: Herman Hand; Rudolph G. Kopp; John Leipold
- Production company: Paramount Pictures
- Distributed by: Paramount Pictures
- Release date: March 10, 1933
- Running time: 73 minutes
- Country: United States
- Language: English

King of the Jungle is a 1933 American pre-Code adventure film directed by H. Bruce Humberstone and Max Marcin and written by Charles Thurley Stoneham, Max Marcin, Fred Niblo, Jr. and Philip Wylie. The film stars Buster Crabbe, Frances Dee, Sidney Toler, Nydia Westman, Robert Barrat, Irving Pichel and Douglass Dumbrille. The film was released on March 10, 1933, by Paramount Pictures.

== Plot ==
A husband and wife travel to Kenya with their three-year-old son to photograph wildlife, but the parents are soon killed by lions. The boy is then adopted and raised by the lions. The scene then shifts to many years later, showing him as an adult and a revered member of the pride, helping to defend them against natives, a rancher and an animal trafficker who are threatening their safety. He helps the lions stage an attack on the rancher's cattle, but he and several lions are captured. They're all sold to a circus manager (Forbes) who names the man "Kaspa the Lion Man" and takes them in cages by ship to America. When the ship docks, a local official orders Forbes to release Kaspa from his cage. He immediately jumps overboard and swims to shore, escaping. In search of food, he later enters a home where Ann and her roommate Sue live. Although they're shocked to discover him, a bond begins to form between Ann and Kaspa. However, Sue remains afraid of him and calls the police. Kaspa allows himself to be retaken by the police and turned over to Forbes, who hires Ann to help calm him and teach him the ways of civilization.

Over time, Ann teaches Kaspa to speak and read English while he performs as a lion tamer. Although he is not happy with his life at the circus, he continues with it in order to earn enough money to purchase the lions and return them to their home. The bond between Kaspa and Ann evolves into love, and they eventually decide to leave the circus together.

Meanwhile, a cruel circus worker has been repeatedly taunting the lions, losing an arm to one of them. He later is discovered trying to poison that lion and is apprehended, but a fire starts during the scuffle. The fire spreads throughout the circus while Kaspa and Ann are nearby making preparations to leave. Hearing about the fire on the radio, they rush back to the circus, where many animals have panicked and are running loose. Kaspa manages to free the lions that are about to be burned in their individual cages, sending them to a larger cage that's safe from the flames. A tiger starts to attack Ann, but a lion intervenes to fight the tiger and drive it off, saving her life. Further events at the circus after this are not shown, but the final scenes shift to Kaspa and Ann in Kenya, where they and the rescued lions rejoin the original pride.

== Cast ==
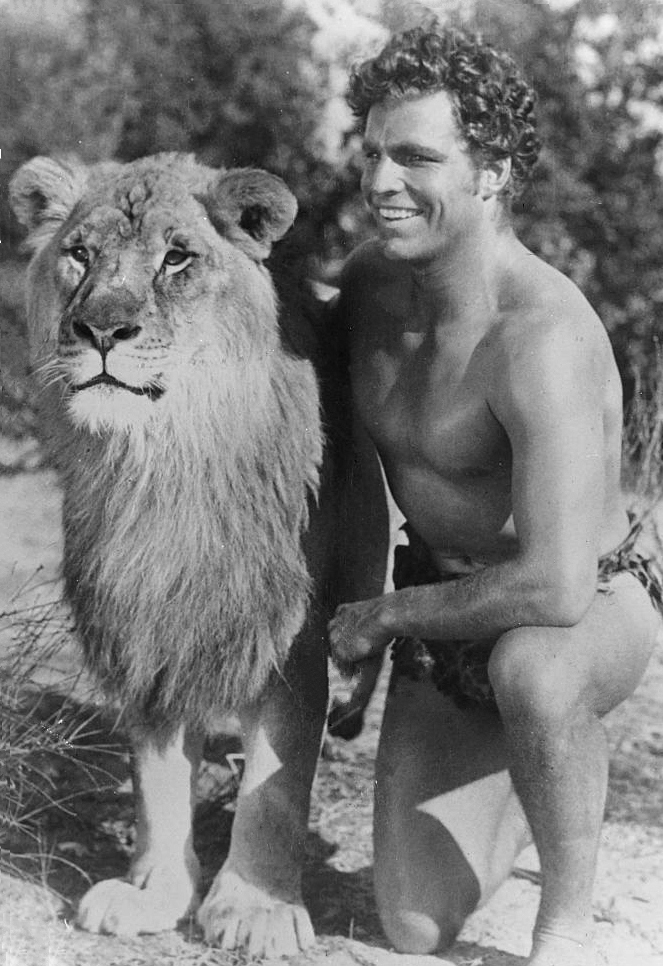
Buster Crabbe in 1933

- Buster Crabbe as Kaspa the Lion Man
- Frances Dee as Ann Rogers
- Sidney Toler as Neil Forbes
- Nydia Westman as Sue
- Robert Barrat as Joe Nolan
- Irving Pichel as Corey
- Douglass Dumbrille as Ed Peters
- Sam Baker as Gwana
- Patricia Farley as Kitty
- Ronnie Cosbey as Kaspa (aged 3)
