= Tarzan and His Mate =

1934 film by Jack Conway, Cedric Gibbons

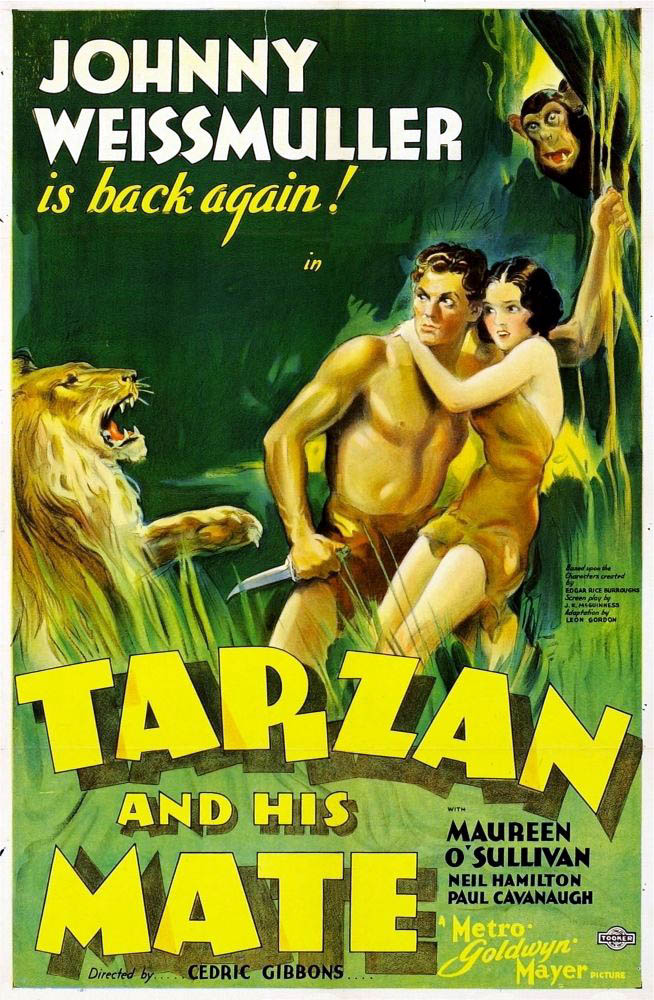
- Theatrical poster
- Directed by: Cedric Gibbons
- Written by: James Kevin McGuinness
- Based on: characters created by Edgar Rice Burroughs
- Produced by: Bernard H. Hyman
- Starring: Johnny Weissmuller; Maureen O'Sullivan; Neil Hamilton; Paul Cavanagh
- Cinematography: Clyde De Vinna; Charles G. Clarke
- Edited by: Tom Held
- Music by: William Axt
- Production company: Metro-Goldwyn-Mayer
- Distributed by: Loew's, Inc.
- Release date: April 16, 1934
- Running time: 104 minutes
- Country: United States
- Language: English
- Budget: $1,279,142 (est.)
- Box office: $2.2 million (worldwide rentals)

Tarzan and His Mate is a 1934 American pre-Code action adventure film based on the Tarzan character created by Edgar Rice Burroughs in his novel Tarzan of the Apes in 1914 published by A.C. McClurg & Co. Directed by Cedric Gibbons, it was the second in the Tarzan film series and starred Johnny Weissmuller and Maureen O'Sullivan. In 2003, the United States Library of Congress deemed the film "culturally, historically or aesthetically significant" and selected it for preservation in the National Film Registry.

== Plot ==
Tarzan and Jane live in the jungle, along with their chimpanzee Cheeta. Harry Holt and his business partner Martin Arlington, leading a large party of locals, meet them on their way to take ivory from an elephant burial ground. Holt had visited the burial ground with Tarzan on an earlier trip, during which he had also met Jane. Holt had sought Tarzan out, as he was the only one who knew the way to the burial ground. On this trip, Holt tries to convince Jane to return with him to civilization by bringing her gifts such as clothing and modern gadgets. Jane tells him she would rather stay with Tarzan. She does agree to convince Tarzan to act as their guide.

When Tarzan calls an elephant, Arlington gets the idea that they can use elephants as pack animals, enabling them to haul much more ivory. When Jane tries to convince Tarzan to call more elephants, she explains to him about hauling the ivory away. Tarzan, thinking that taking the ivory is profaning the burial ground, refuses. In addition, he refuses to even lead them to the burial ground, now that he knows of their intent. Arlington and Holt have everything they own tied up in this venture and are frantic to continue on. Arlington asks Holt how they found the burial ground the first time, and Holt explains that they had followed a dying elephant. Seizing on that idea, Arlington shoots an elephant, mortally wounding it so that it will lead them to the burial ground. Only Jane's intervention keeps Tarzan from murdering Arlington.

After being abandoned by Tarzan and Jane, Arlington and Holt lead their baggage carriers, led by Saidi, a friend of Jane and Tarzan's, to the burial ground, following the wounded elephant. Elephants, aware of the impending disgrace of their sacred ground, turn up in the hundreds, and threaten to exterminate Holt and Arlington's party. Tarzan and Jane arrive in time to save them, after which Arlington feigns repentance, promising to leave the next day without the ivory. Satisfied, Tarzan agrees to guide their departure, and sends the elephants away.

Early the next morning, Arlington ambushes Tarzan, shooting him out of a tree. Tarzan falls into the water, and Arlington thinks he has killed him. After Arlington leaves, a hippopotamus rescues a semi-conscious Tarzan and carries him to a group of chimpanzees, which tend to him. Tarzan has received a head wound, but the bullet only grazed him, though it has left him very weak. The head chimpanzee applies plant sap to staunch the bleeding.

Arlington returns to the group, claiming that he saw Tarzan being killed by a crocodile. A distraught Jane agrees to return to civilization. Arlington and Holt have their baggage carriers each take a tusk from the burial ground, and they begin to head back. Cheeta leaves Jane and looks for Tarzan. Chased by a lion, Cheeta escapes and comes upon the chimpanzee group tending to Tarzan.

As Tarzan recuperates, the safari makes its way through the jungle. Cheeta returns and lets Jane know that Tarzan is alive. However, shortly after the safari is confronted by a hostile tribe of "lion-eating men" (gomangani-popo-numa), who kill two of the bearers and intend to kill the entire safari. Under cover of gunfire, a few of the safari makes it to some nearby caves, set into the face of a rocky cliff. The bearer who was carrying the ammunition crate is killed on the way. When Saidi makes an attempt to retrieve the crate, he is captured by the lion men. Cheeta escapes and runs off to tell Tarzan.

The safari watch in horror the next morning as Saidi is staked out to a tree, as the lion men intend to use him as bait to call lions to attack the safari. When Holt rushes out to save him, he is wounded by a thrown spear. Wounded, he begins to free Saidi when the lions show up and tear him and Saidi to pieces. Meanwhile, Cheeta has returned to Tarzan, who while still weak, sets off after Cheeta.

The lions attempt to get at the safari, but are held off by Jane and Arlington and one of the bearers. When the bearer goes down on a ledge, Arlington goes out to save him, and he is attacked by a lion. Arlington is killed, but Jane kills the charging lion. As the lions become more aggressive, Tarzan and the chimpanzees arrive. The chimpanzees begin to throw the lion men out of the trees, where they are set upon by the lions. Jane kills two lions before she runs out of ammunition. As she is about to be attacked by the last lion, Tarzan arrives and kills it with his knife. Shortly after, a large herd of elephants arrives, trampling the lions, killing several and running the remainder off.

With the lion men and the lions routed, the elephants, along with Tarzan, Jane, and Cheeta, return the ivory to the burial ground.

== Cast ==
- Johnny Weissmuller as Tarzan
- Maureen O'Sullivan as Jane Parker
- Neil Hamilton as Harry Holt
- Paul Cavanagh as Martin Arlington
- Forrester Harvey as Beamish
- Nathan Curry as Saidi
- George Barrows as Gorilla
- Yola d'Avril as Madame Feronde
- Paul Porcasi as Monsieur Feronde
- Ray Corrigan as Gorilla
- Desmond Roberts as Henry Van Ness

== Production ==
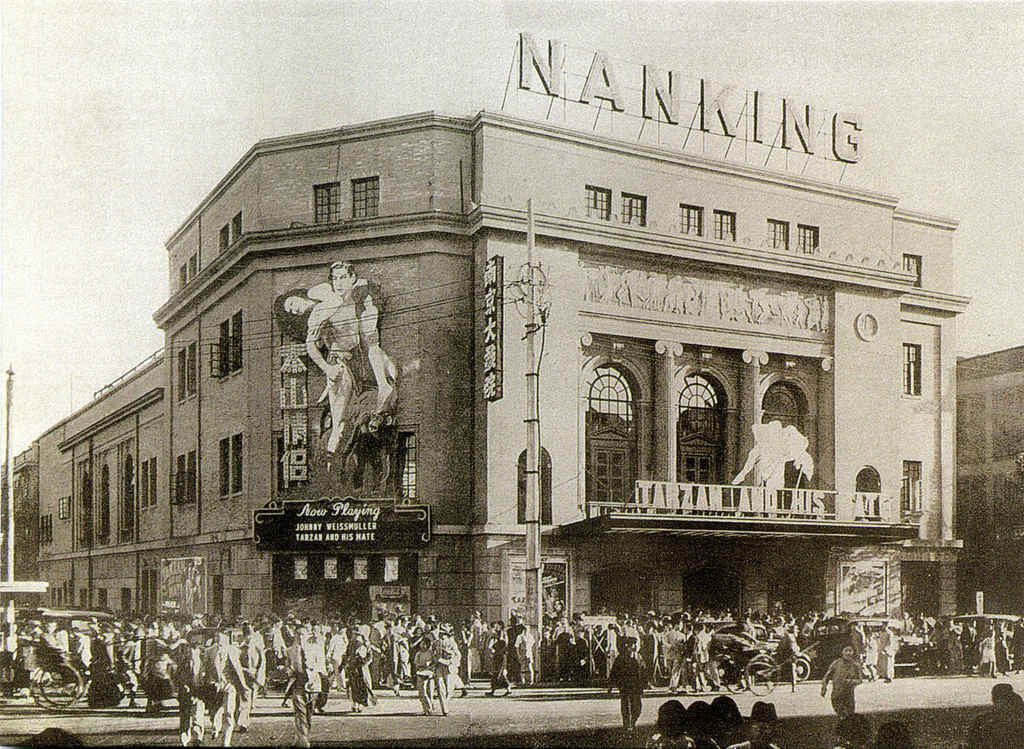
Tarzan and His Mate being shown in Shanghai's Nanking Theatre

In 1932 M.G.M's Tarzan the Ape Man cost $652,675 to make, and took $2.54 million at the box office. Edgar Rice Burroughs, keen to capitalize on the success of the first film (as were M.G.M), began negotiations in March 1932 for future Tarzan films. Discussions between Burroughs’ representative, Ralph Rothmund and M.G.M executives, Irving Thalberg and Sam Marx, had begun in March 1932, and a new contract was signed in May of that year for a second Tarzan feature, with an option for a further two. Burroughs received $45,000. Also in May, Burroughs contacted producer Bernard H. Hyman with the suggestion that Tarzan films be released as seasonal events. In mid-June 1932, The Hollywood Reporter announced that former independent producer Bud Barsky was to write the "original yarn" for the yet to be titled Tarzan sequel, and was to be assisted by M.G.M staffers R. L. Johnson and Arthur S. Hyman.

Story conferences were held in March, with the author of the play White Cargo Leon Gordon, producer Bernie Hyman, supervising art director Cedric Gibbons, and production manager Joe Cohn. These early drafts toyed with the idea of a fight with a huge mechanical crocodile, and a spectacular jungle fire. By May 1933, a dialogue continuity by Howard Emmett Rogers was completed. This and earlier script and conference ideas became the basis for the various drafts of the eventual screenplay credited to James Kevin McGuinness.

Special effects were to be overseen by Cedric Gibbons and executed by M.G.M's A. Arnold Gillespie and Warren Newcombe, James Basevi and Irving Reis. For their day, the special effects of the film were complex, involving such devices as matte paintings, miniatures, split screens, and rear projection.

A June 29, 1933 Hollywood Reporter news item announced that W. S. Van Dyke (director of the first Tarzan The Ape Man), was to be Gibbons' co-director. By July 1, 1933, Van Dyke was dropped from the project, and Gibbons was announced as the film's sole director. In September 1933, however, the Hollywood Reporter announced that Jack Conway, was to take over the direction of one of Gibbons' units.

Filming on Tarzan and His Mate began August 2, 1933. Joining Johnny Weissmuller for the sequel were Rod La Rocque (who had just appeared in S.O.S. Iceberg (1933), co-starring Leni Riefenstahl, one of the last German-U.S co-productions, due to the rise of the Nazi Party), Murray Kinnell (The House of Rothschild), and Frank Reicher (one of 17 films he appeared in 1934). Problems soon developed. After 3 ½ weeks of shooting, the first unit was shut down; Gibbons had shot a lot of excess footage, and costs were spiraling. When it resumed, Gibbons was no longer the director, in his place was Jack Conway as dialogue director with James C. McKay directing a number of animal sequences. A late August 1933 Hollywood Reporter news item announced that Rod La Rocque had been pulled from the cast, and replaced by Paul Cavanagh in the role of Martin Arlington, ‘because of miscasting’. The roles of Tom Pierce and Van Ness were also changed, and Frank Reicher and Murray Kinnell were replaced by Desmond Roberts and William Stack, respectively.

Some sources report Jack Conway directed most of the picture; however Maureen O’Sullivan has said James C. McKay actually directed the film. His official credit on the picture was Animal Director. McKay (1894–1971) had a resume full of various credits, and he jumped back and forth between the jobs of director and editor. McKay had received a Production Assistant credit on Trader Horn (1931) directed by W. S. Van Dyke. McKay was initially given the director's chair for the sequel, Tarzan Escapes (1936), indicating M.G.M must have been happy with the work he did on Tarzan and His Mate; however there would be many changes to the cast and crew on that film too (including Elmer Sheeley replacing Cedric Gibbons as art director!).

Plans to film in Africa were scrapped and several locations around Los Angeles were used, including Sherwood Forest, Lake Sherwood, Whittier, California, Big Tujunga, and China Flat. Bert Nelson and George Emerson, the M.G.M animal trainers, doubled for Weissmuller. Trapeze artists Alfred Codona and the Flying Codonas, who had performed in the first Tarzan film, also doubled for Weissmuller and O'Sullivan, and acted as the elder Cheeta. Dressed in ape suits, The Picchianis performed in the film, and one of the troupe doubled for Weissmuller in a tree jumping sequence. Nelson also doubled for Paul Cavanagh. As with Tarzan the Ape Man, Indian elephants taken from M.G.M's zoo had attachments fixed to their ears and tusks to suggest African elephants. During the crocodile wrestling scene, a mechanical Nile crocodile, equipped with nigrosine dye sacks to simulate blood, was used. For the elephants vs. lions battle travelling matte shots were used to depict lions leaping up and holding on to elephants, who then seized them with their trunks and hurled them down, or crushed them beneath their feet. Tarzan rides a black rhinoceros in one scene - a first for film. The rhinoceros, Mary, was imported from the Hagenbeck Zoo in Hamburg, Germany. Weissmuller did the scene himself, sustaining only minor scrapes to sensitive places from Mary's rough hide.

Filming was not completed until the end of March 1934, because of re-takes and additional aerial scenes involving Jane and Tarzan. Betty Roth, wife of lion owner Louis Roth, doubled for O'Sullivan in some close contact scenes with lions near the film's conclusion. O’Sullivan was absent for over a month recovering from an appendectomy. M.G.M had spent $1,279,142 on the production. In early April 1934, after previews M.G.M cut the film, editing out fourteen-and-a-half minutes.

== Controversy ==
The film has acquired a cult status, largely due to O’Sullivan wearing one of the most revealing costumes on screen to that time — a halter-top and a loincloth that left her thighs and hips exposed. Because Jane was a cultivated lady from England (not Baltimore, as in Burroughs' novel), with manners and poise, her wearing such a provocative outfit was particularly risqué and symbolic of her sexual freedom. In this pre-Code film, Jane sleeps in the nude, swims nude with Tarzan, is constantly touched by Tarzan, has a scene in which she is stranded in the jungle naked, and is seen nude in silhouette when dressing in a well lit tent. That Jane and Tarzan sleep together is all the more startling by Hollywood standards because they are not married; the end credits list O'Sullivan as Jane ‘Parker,’ emphasizing that she was single and living in sin. However, a conversation early in the film suggests that they have been married. Tarzan brings breakfast to Jane in their treetop shelter. When he says, “Never forget, I love you.” “ Love who?” Jane prompts...”Love my wife,” he replies. In its 1934 review, Variety referred to the pair as “Mr. and Mrs. Tarzan”.

The scene that caused the most commotion, the "underwater ballet" sequence, was available in three different versions that were edited by MGM to meet the standards of particular markets. Gibbons' wife Dolores del Rio had performed a risqué nude swim in Bird of Paradise (1932), a sequence that is said to have inspired the one in Tarzan. Tarzan and Jane (O'Sullivan's swimming double, Josephine McKim, who competed in the 1928 games with Johnny Weissmuller), dance a graceful underwater ballet with Jane completely nude. When she rises out of the water, Jane (now Maureen O’Sullivan) flashes a bare breast. In another scene, a glimpse of O'Sullivan's pubic hair is briefly visible under her loincloth. As TCM's Paul Tatara observes, “Such big-screen impropriety was virtually unheard of at the time, and the Production Code Office had a fit”. If native nudity was seen at all it was usually done by dancing girl extras, or non-white actresses due to the time's double standards (witness the topless "native" girls at the start of the film, or the topless "natives" in the 1935 Sanders of the River). The new Production Code Office thought O'Sullivan's scant costume, coupled with her sexual charisma, was too much. In April, Joseph Breen, director of public relations of the MPPDA, reported to his president, Will Hays, that Tarzan and His Mate had been rejected because of shots in which "the girl was shown completely in the nude."

Breen: "The man in the shot wore a loincloth, but a critical examination of the shot indicated that the woman was stark naked. There were four or five shots of the woman… which showed the front of the woman's body."

When MGM production head Irving Thalberg protested at the jury's decision by claiming that the 1928 film White Shadows in the South Seas had "fifty naked women" in it, the jurors screened that film and determined that none of the women were naked. According to film historian Rudy Behlmer: "From all evidence, three versions of the sequence eventually went out to separate territories during the film's initial release. One with Jane clothed in her jungle loincloth outfit, one with her topless, and one with her in the nude. However, by April 24, 1934, all prints of Tarzan and His Mate in all territories were ordered changed. Additionally, the New York Censors previewed the film, and insisted that the scene involving Cavanagh lowering his nude body into a portable bathtub be eliminated as well. It was not until Ted Turner purchased the pre-1986 MGM film library that an unedited print of the original film was discovered in the MGM vaults and released in 1986.

== Reception ==
Although the film was a hit, it did not earn as much as the first Tarzan film in the United States, making Tarzan and His Mate a box office disappointment for MGM. Internationally, it was a huge success, despite the fact that it was banned in Germany by the National Socialist Party on the grounds that it showed a Nordic man in brutal surroundings.

In his April 21, 1934, review, Mordaunt Hall of The New York Times praised the film as “if anything, even more fantastic than its predecessor... Aside from the wild tale, this film is a marvel from a photographic standpoint...Needless to say that Miss O'Sullivan and Mr. Weissmuller acquit themselves in the same favorable fashion they did in their former hectic experiences.”

Hall followed up on April 29, 1934, with another piece headlined “LIFE IN THE JUNGLE—Tarzan and His Mate a Marvel of Camera Work”:

“FANTASTIC as is the yarn of Tarzan and His Mate, a sequel to the highly successful Tarzan, the Ape Man, it has been produced with such marked cleverness that it affords no little fun and a full measure of excitement...A great deal of credit is due to the expert work of the camera men. Charles Clarke and Clyde DeVinna...the unfailing manner in which they deal with their scenes is little short of marvelous...just as one might hazard that Tarzan is struggling with a stuffed lion, one sees that the animal has a full-toothed jaw...”

Variety observed:

“the monkeys do everything but bake cakes and the very human elephants always seem on the verge of sitting down for a nice, quiet game of chess; yet the picture has a strange sort of power that overcomes the total lack of logic.”

Dennis Schwartz from Ozus' World Movie Reviews gives the film a grade A−, calling it the best of the series. In his review, Schwartz praised the film's action sequences, 'brisk' pacing, and cinematography. Kim Newman from Empire Online rates the film three out of five stars, calling it "Engaging and surprisingly sexy and raw for its time with luscious production values."

Leonard Maltin gives the restored version of the film 3.5 out of 4 stars, praising it as an “Opulent, action-packed entry co-directed by MGM's famed art director Gibbons, and notable for pre-Code sexual candor and a distinct lack of clothes.“

On review aggregator Rotten Tomatoes, Tarzan and His Mate holds an approval rating of 100%, based on 14 reviews, and an average rating of 7.41/10.

== Legacy ==
The film was nominated for American Film Institute's 2002 AFI's 100 Years...100 Passions list.

In 2003, the United States Library of Congress deemed the film "culturally, historically or aesthetically significant" and selected it for preservation in the National Film Registry.

== See also ==
- List of cult films
