= Anna Carroll =

Anna Carroll may refer to:

- Anna Lee Carroll (1930–2017), American actress
- Anna Ella Carroll (1815–1894), American politician, pamphleteer and lobbyist

== See also ==
- Anne Carroll (born 1940), British actress and director
