= Paddy Summerfield (artist) =

British artist (1929–2025)

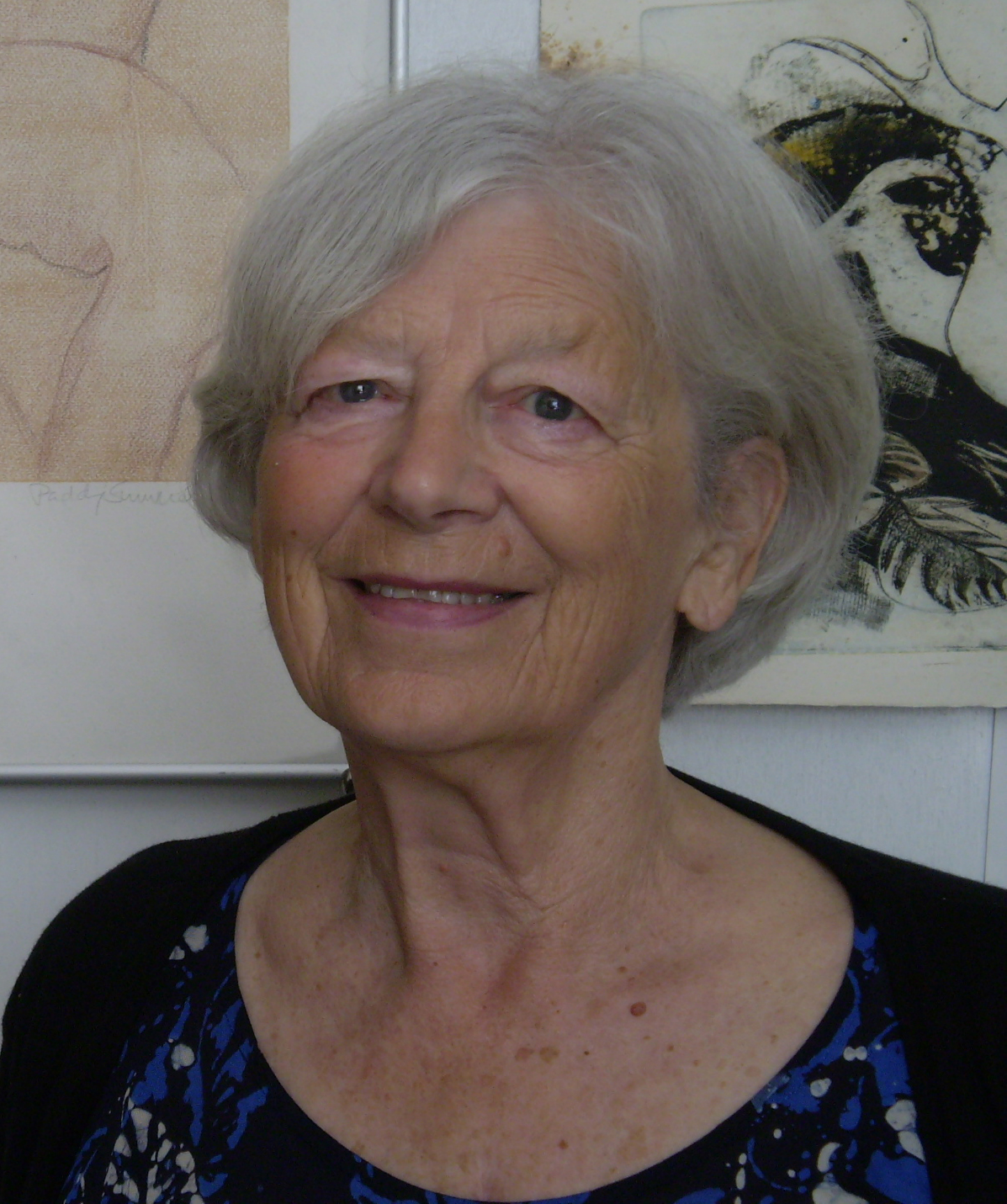
- Summerfield in 2011
- Born: 9 January 1929; Hastings, Sussex, England
- Died: June 2025 (aged 96); Scheveningen, Netherlands
- Known for: Chigiri-e
- Style: Abstract and figurative
- Website: paddysummerfield.nl

Paddy Summerfield (9 January 1929 – June 2025) was a British chigiri-e and graphic artist who was known for the application of the Japanese chigiri-e technique to abstract and figurative art using strong and vivid colours. Traditionally the technique was widely used for decorative subjects. Her graphic art includes etchings, book covers and she designed the logo for an international women's advocacy group now Issis-wicce.

== Background ==
Summerfield was of Irish-English background and was born in Hastings, England. She began her creative life by being commissioned by Liberty of London to design and make soft toys during World War II. She won a scholarship to the Hastings School of Art and later studied at the Vrije Academie voor Beeldende Kunsten, The Hague, The Netherlands. Summerfield started exhibiting as a graphic artist in 1976 with a solo exhibition in Chamonix, France which enabled her to become a professional artist under French law.

On 14 July 2025, it was announced that Summerfield had died at the age of 96.

== Work ==
Summerfield was part of the European development of interest in the Japanese chigiri-e technique and she participated in the first chigiri-e page in Wikipedia in 2008. In Japan the traditional chigiri-e technique was used for images of flowers and landscapes with hand-made coloured paper, torn and arranged to create the image. Summerfield broadened the technique and applied it to abstract and figurative art. She used an etching press, oil-based paint and super-thin (10g) paper to achieve a transparency allowing the construction of layers for the final work.

Many of Summerfield's themes for her chigiri-e work were based on body language. In 1990-1993 she had her own gallery/atelier within the Mazie Galerie, The Hague exclusively for her etching and chigiri-e. She had over 40 solo and group exhibitions in various countries of Europe and from 1988 her chigiri-e work was shown in exhibitions in galleries in The Netherlands, Grafiekwinkel INKT, Galerie Wind, Kunsthuis 18, De Hofboerderij as well as Galerie Orangerie Willemstad, Curaçao.

Paddy Summerfield's early work used etching, drawing and monoprint techniques with exhibitions in Switzerland and France before starting in The Netherlands at Galerie Jan van Munster (now Smelik and Stokking) The Hague. Her themes focused on nature the relationship between nature and technology and human and animal body language. Apart from many book cover designs she illustrated a children's book.

Paddy Summerfield chigiri-e work

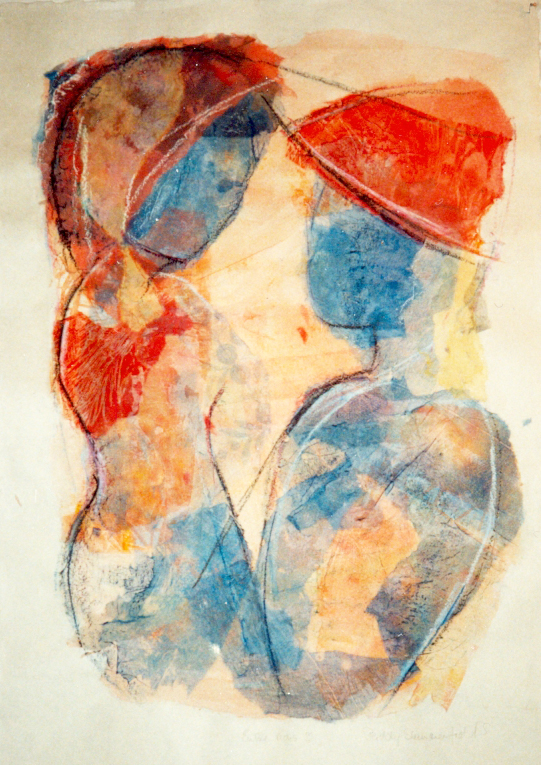
Entre Nous

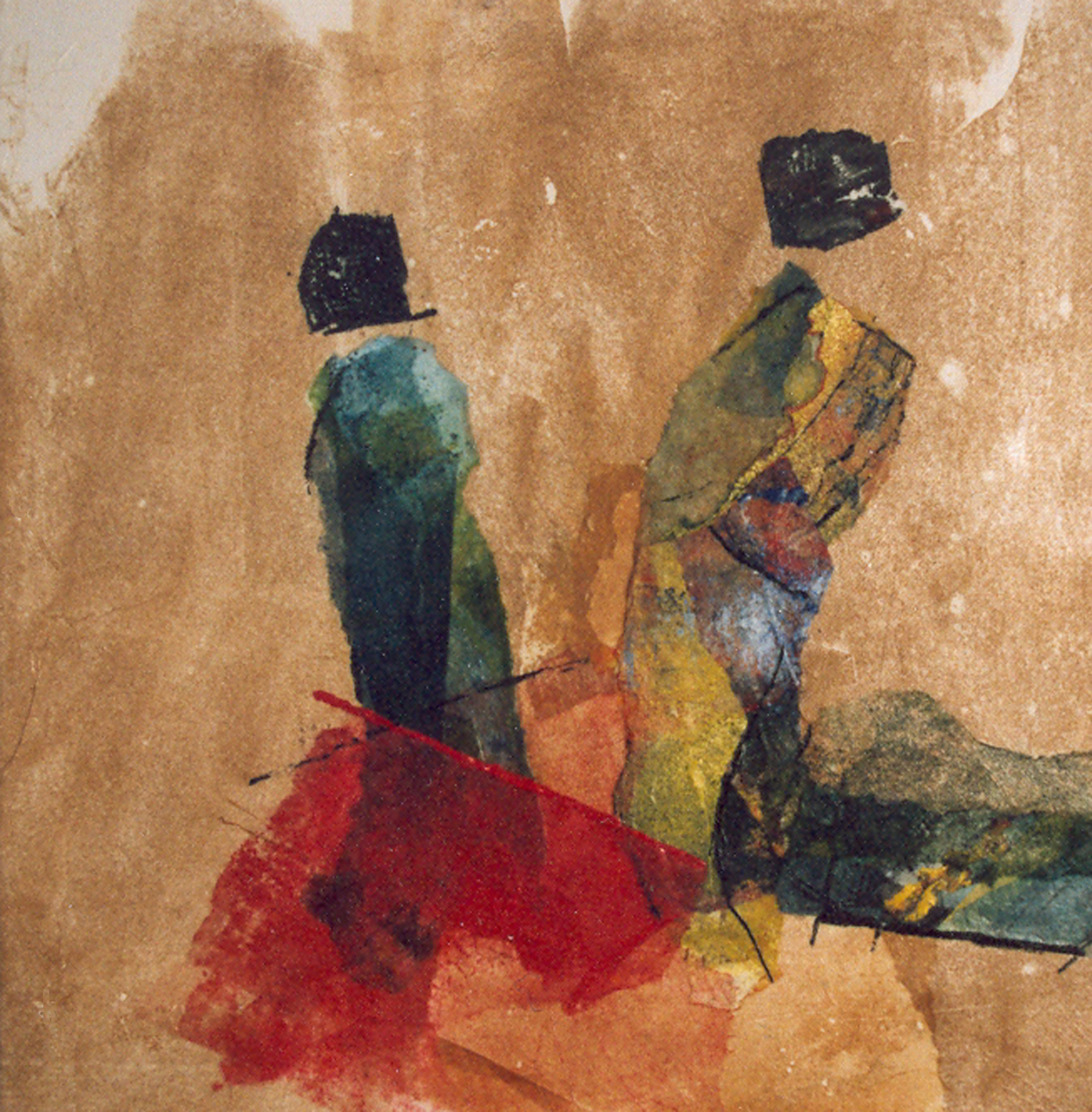
Friends 7

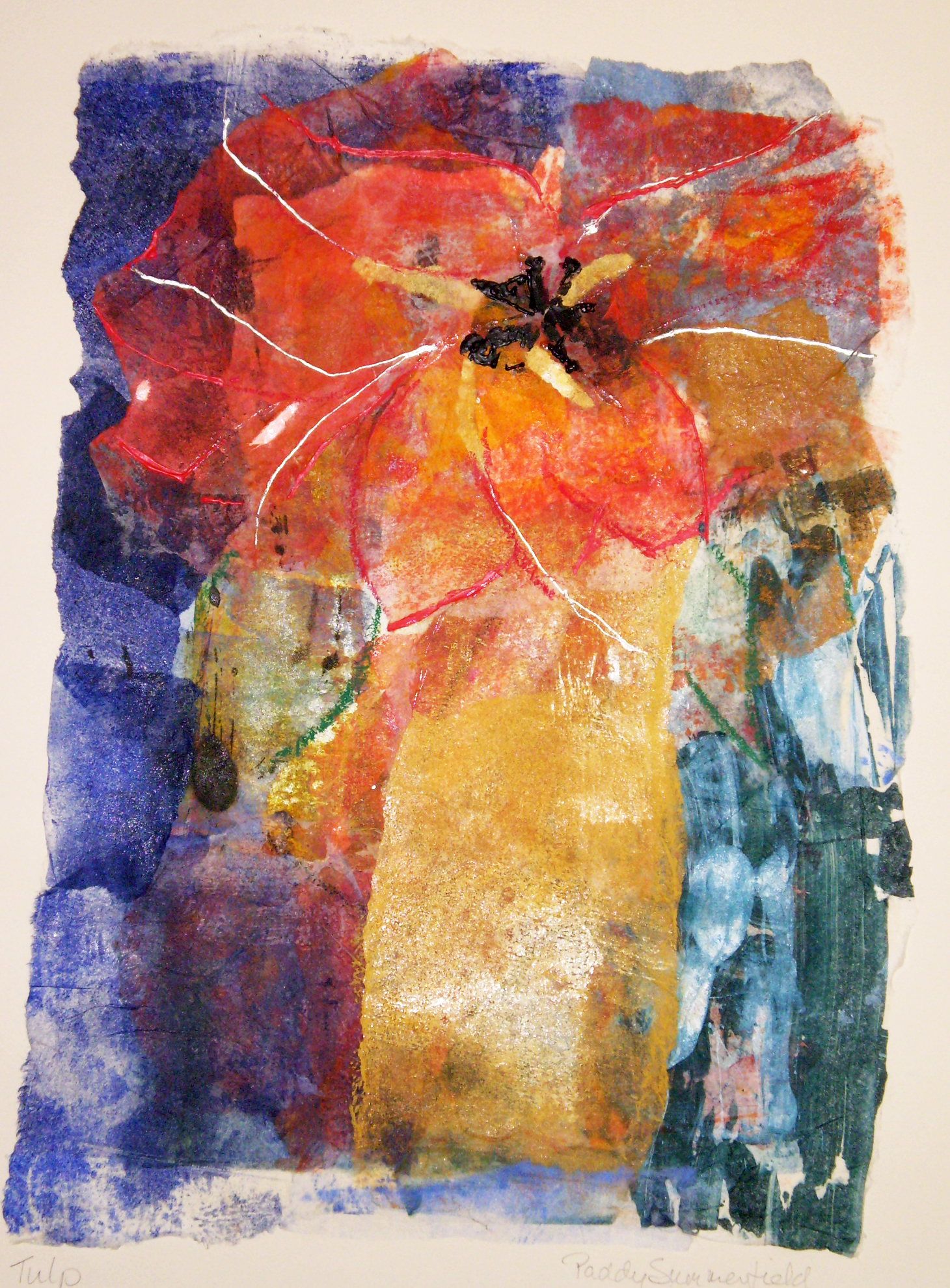
Tulip

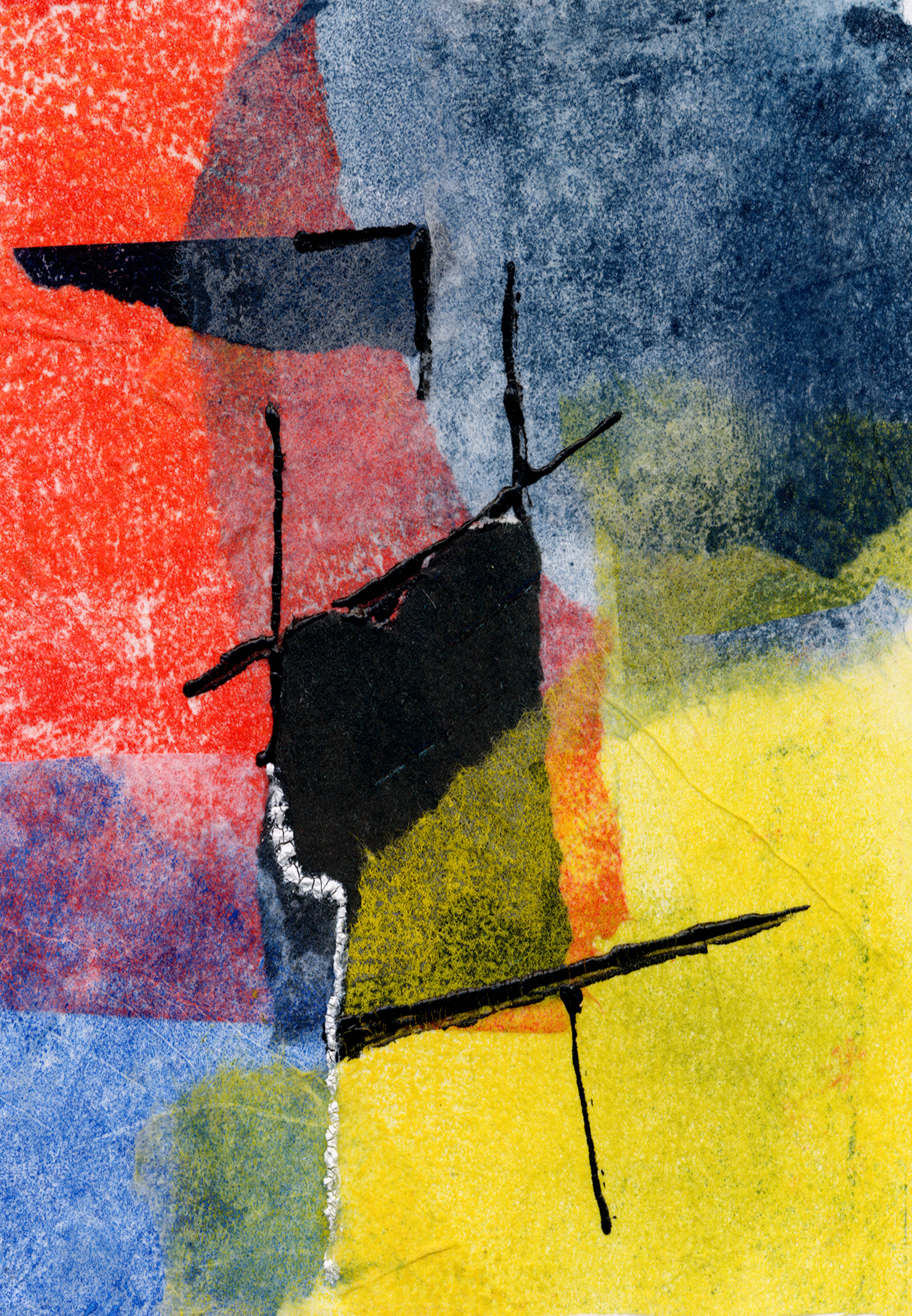
Zonder Titel
Paddy Summerfied etchings and graphic work

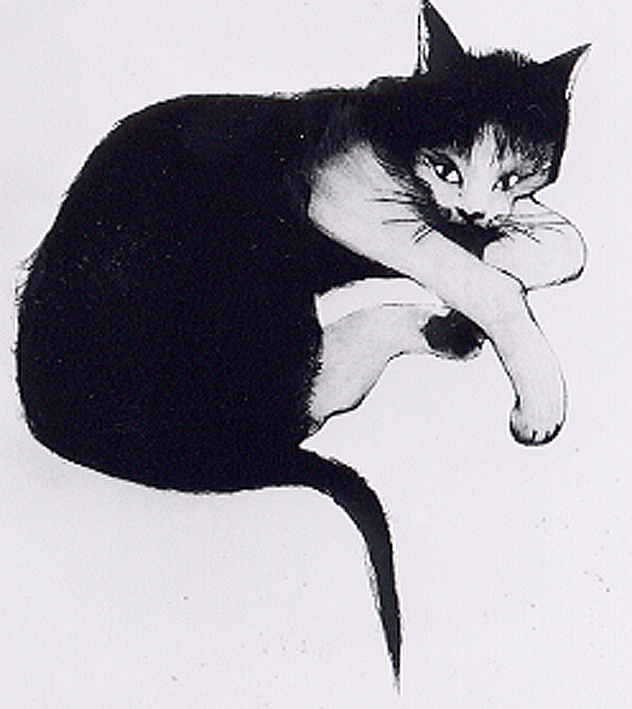
Mooch

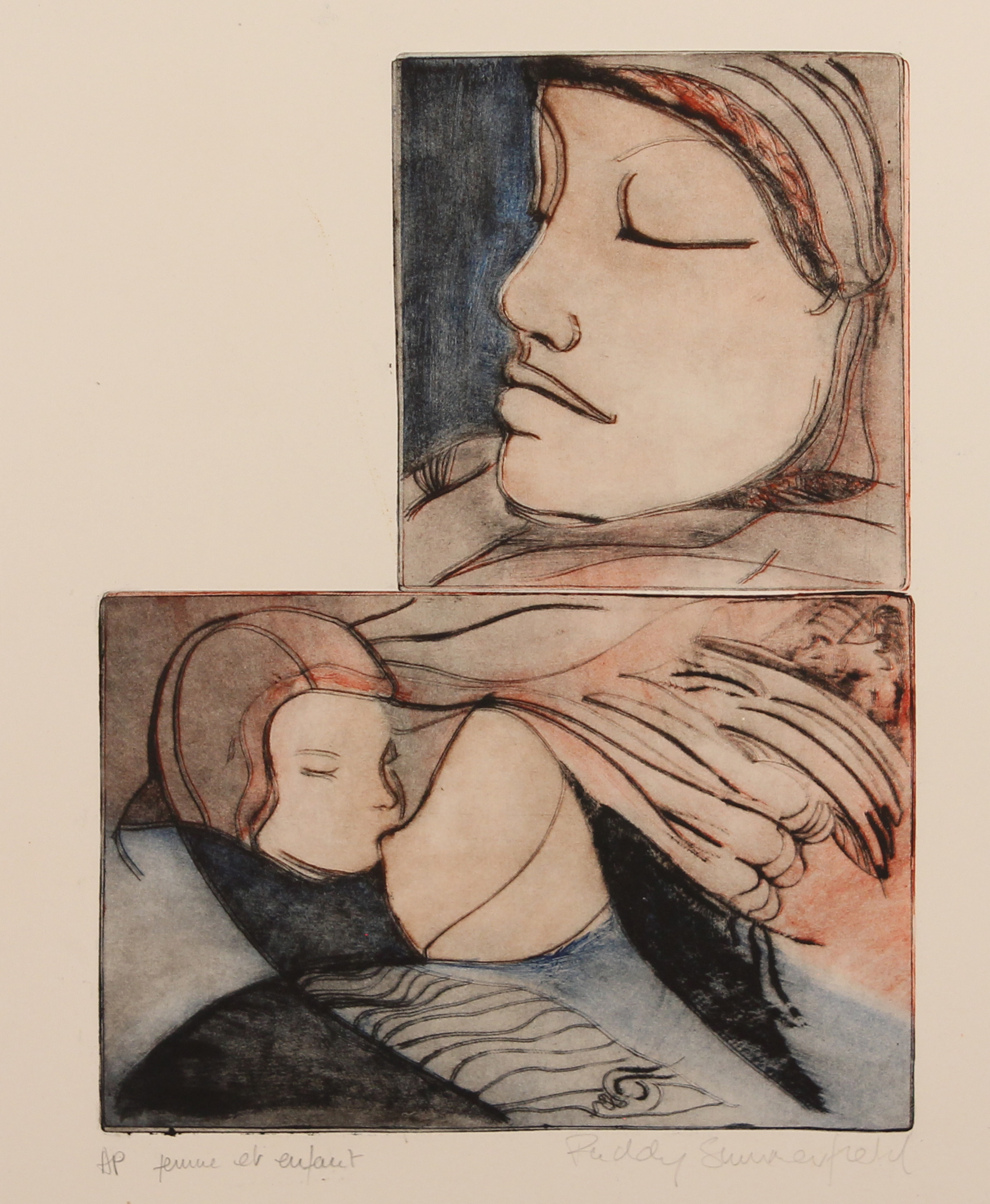
Femme et Enfant

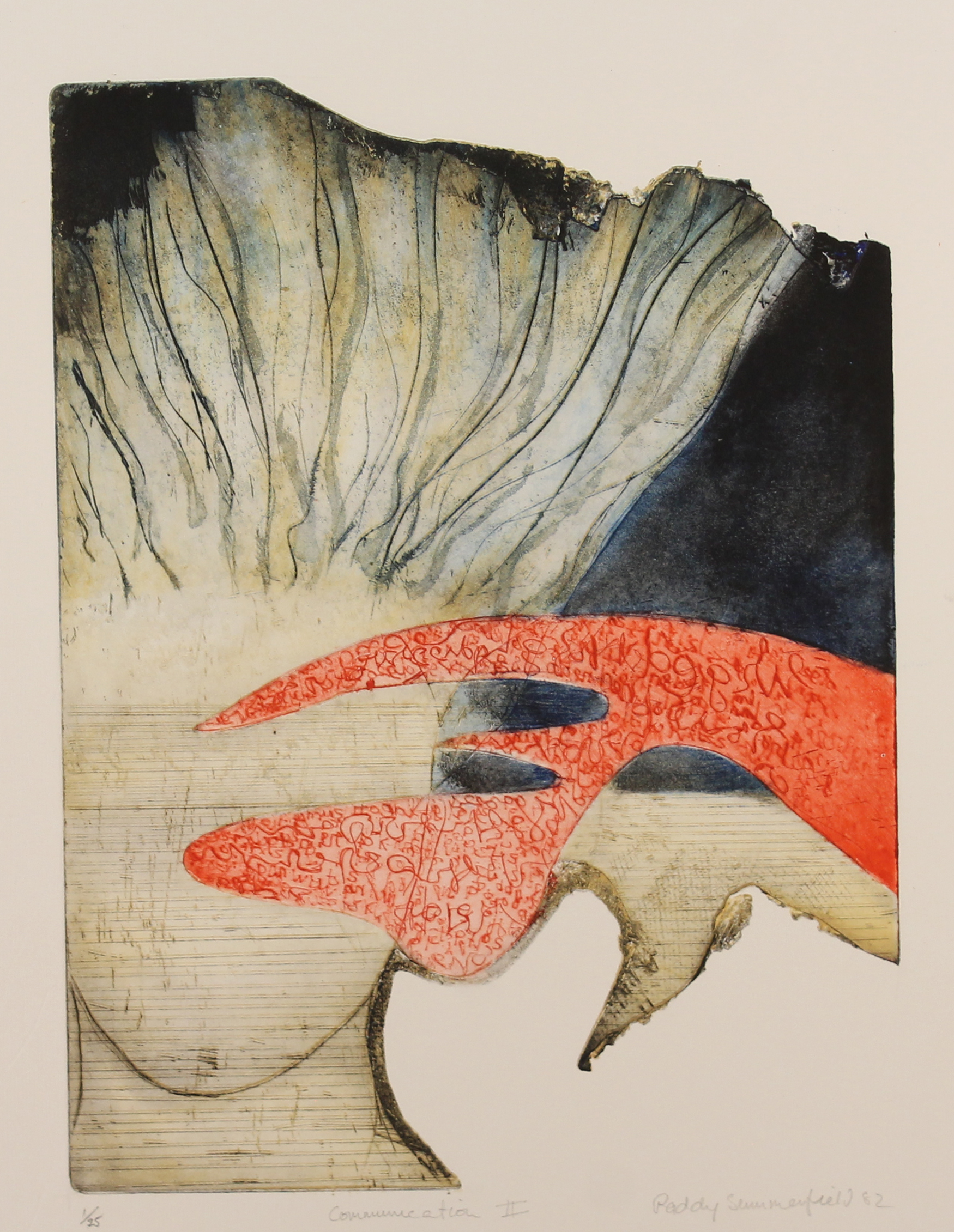
Communication

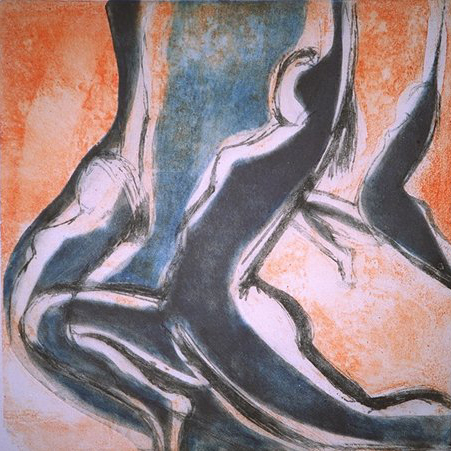
Salute to the Sun

== Publications ==
- Just Dropping By (2025) (poems and illustrations) by Paddy Summerfield U2pi BV. Den Haag. Netherlands ISBN 978-90-82395785
- Illustrations forː (2024) De Avonturen van Rossie de Uil (die in Scheveningen woont): translated from English by Peter de Valk: The Hague: Uitgeverij U2pi ISBN 978-90-823957-6-1
- Paddy Summerfield (2019) by Paddy Summerfield U2pi BV Den Haag ISBN 978-90-823957-2-3
- Illustrations forː (2018) The Adventures of Ginger the Owl (who lives in Scheveningen): The Hague: Uitgeverij U2pi ISBN 978-90-823957-1-6
