= Michel Bergerac =

French businessman

- Born: 13 February 1932; Biarritz, France
- Died: September 11, 2016 (aged 84); NewYork-Presbyterian Hospital; New York City, U.S.
- Education: University of California, Los Angeles
- Occupation: Businessman
- Years active: 1975-1985
- Known for: President of Revlon

Michel Christian Bergerac (13 February 1932 – 11 September 2016) was a French businessman who was president of cosmetics company Revlon in succession to Charles Revson. His older brother was actor and businessman Jacques Bergerac.

Bergerac was involved in the 1986 Delaware Supreme Court case Revlon, Inc. v. MacAndrews & Forbes Holdings, Inc..

== See also ==
- Jacques Bergerac
