= Cecil W Bacon =

British artist and illustrator (1905–1992)

Cecil Walter Bacon MSIA
- Born: 24 August 1905; Battle, Sussex, England
- Died: 12 August 1992 (aged 86)
- Other name: CWB
- Education: Sutton Valence School; St Lawrence College; Hastings School of Art
- Occupation: Artist
- Known for: Poster design

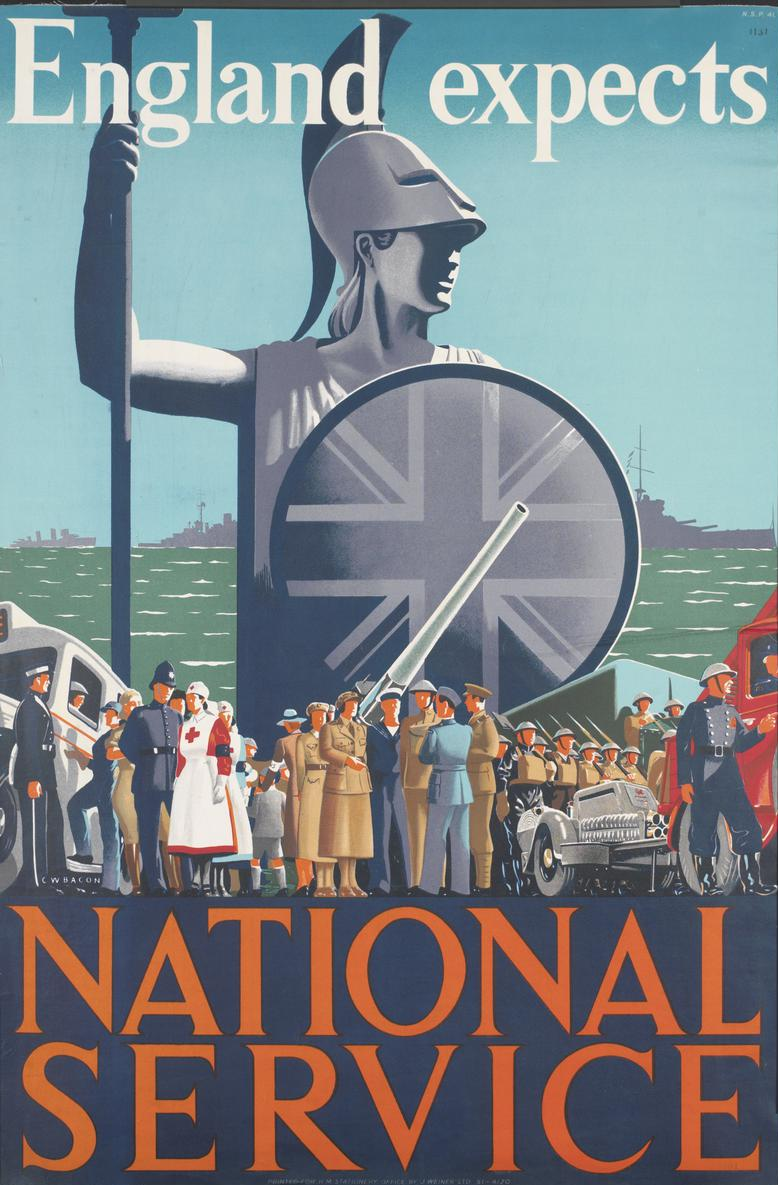
World War II poster by Bacon, encouraging people to enlist in the armed forces

Cecil Walter Bacon, MSIA (24 August 1905 – 12 August 1992), who signed his work "CWB", was a British artist and illustrator. Much of his work was in the art deco style.

== Biography ==
Bacon was born in Battle, Sussex, England, where his father was a businessman who ran a tannery. Bacon was educated at Sutton Valence School, St Lawrence College, Ramsgate, and Hastings School of Art, being at the latter from 1923 to 1925, when he was taught by Philip Cole. In 1926, he began working for an advertising agency on London, before turning freelance in 1929. Between 1932 and 1935 he designed a number of posters for London Transport.

During World War II, he served in the Royal Air Force as a Leading Aircraftsman, before, in 1942, being assigned to work producing propaganda artwork for the Ministry of Information.

He worked regularly for the Radio Times and in 1943, during the war, he drew an illustration for the Christmas edition, depicting a soldier holding a sprig of holly.

After the war, he produced designs for, among others, British Railways and the Post Office Savings Bank. He was adept at scraperboard work, and in 1951 wrote a book on the topic. He also illustrated a number of books, and designed book jackets, including those for first editions of early works by Raymond Chandler.

Bacon married Irene Proctor in 1929; they had two sons. He died on 12 August 1992. A number of his posters are in the collection of the London Transport Museum. A retrospective exhibition, Designer's Progress, took place in 1984 at Hastings Museum and Art Gallery.

== Bibliography ==
- Scraperboard drawing. How to do series. Vol. 41. Studio Publications. 1951.

=== Illustrations/ book jackets ===
- Howes, Frank (1935) Key to the Art of Music. Blackie
- Morgan, Joan (1940). Citizen of Westminster. Chapman and Hall.
- Phelan, Jim (1941). Murder By Numbers. Methuen.
- King, Frank (1945). Gestapo Dormouse. Hale.
- Bunyan, John (1948). Pilgrims Progress. Collins.
- Morse, Richard (1949). Introduction to Wild Flowers. A & C Black.
- Teale, Edwin Way (1949). Dune Boy: the early years of a naturalist. Hale.
- Cain, James M. (1949). The Moth. Hale.
- Chandler, Raymond (1949). The Little Sister. Hamish Hamilton.
- Chandler, Raymond (1950). The Simple Art of Murder. Hamish Hamilton.
- York, Jeremy (1950). Sentence of Death. Andrew Melrose.
- Morton, HV (1964). A Traveller in Italy. Methuen, London.
- Randall, Anthony A. (1965). Ride A Tiger. Hale.
- Tatlock, Richard (1966). The Story of the Early Church. From the Beginnings to A.D. 316. A.R. Mowbray.
- Hogg, Gary (1971). The Shell book of exploring Britain. (maps)
- Downing, Todd. The Cat Screams. Methuen.
- McGivern, William P. The Big Heat. Hamish Hamilton.
