= Hastings School of Art =

Former art school in Hastings, England

Coordinates: 50.852°N 0.551°E

The Hastings School of Art was an art school in Hastings, England, located at the Brassey Institute on the top two floors of the library building at Claremont.

== Information ==
This Part refers to Hastings School of Art Hastings UK Its former students include Maurice Charles John Wilson, Cecil W Bacon, Frank Dobson, Eric Slater, James T.A. Osborne Jean Rees, Harold Gilman, Paddy Summerfield the marine artist Louis Dodd, and war artist Dennis Barnham. The school had many Victorian casts for the students to work from including a Vatican reproduction of Michelangelo's Madonna and Child relief, which is still on show at the current art department. The art department was moved to the main college campus in Archery Road, St Leonards-on-Sea in 1982.
