= Fear No More (film) =

1961 American film by Bernard Wiesen

- Directed by: Bernard Wiesen
- Written by: Leslie Edgley (novel); Robert Bloomfield
- Produced by: Earl Durham; Julie Gibson; Bernard Wiesen
- Starring: Mala Powers; Jacques Bergerac; Anna Lee Carroll
- Cinematography: Ernest Haller
- Edited by: John A. Bushelman
- Music by: Paul Glass
- Production company: Scaramouche Productions
- Distributed by: Pathé-America Distributing Co. Astor Pictures
- Release date: November 1, 1961
- Running time: 80 minutes
- Country: United States
- Language: English

Fear No More is a 1961 American thriller film directed by Bernard Wiesen and starring Mala Powers, Jacques Bergerac and Anna Lee Carroll. It was written by Robert Bloomfield based on the 1946 novel of the same name by Leslie Edgley.

== Plot ==
Personal secretary Sharon Carlin arrives at a railway station on a mission to deliver an important envelope for her boss. When she enters her compartment, a man threatens her with a gun. She sees a woman in the compartment who appears dead. The man knocks Sharon unconscious. When she comes to, she finds herself interrogated by a plainclothes policeman who accuses her of murdering the woman. When they leave the train for the police station, Sharon manages to dodge the detective and, panicked, runs in front of a car which has to swerve to avoid her, slightly injuring a young boy who is a passenger. Sharon begs the driver, Paul Colbert, a divorced man who is the boy's father and is returning the boy to his mother, to help her. He reluctantly agrees. After a disagreeable scene at the wife's house, Paul drops Sharon back at her home. She has forgotten that her male friend is staying in her flat. Later Paul phones her and they have a coffee together at a local beat café. When she returns home, she finds her friend dead. Chased by the murderer, she dashes out of the apartment block and Paul drives her away. She eventually discloses to him that she can't go to the police as they won't believe her: she has a mental health history and was once in a sanatorium. The following day, Paul drives her to her employer's house where, inexplicably, his employer and his staff disavow any knowledge of her errand. More worryingly, her employer, Milo Seymour claims a large sum of money has disappeared from his safe, to which only he and she have the combination. Is Sharon the victim of an elaborate plot, or is she veering into madness?

== Cast ==
- Mala Powers as Sharon Carlin
- Jacques Bergerac as Paul Colbert
- John Harding as Milo Seymour
- Helena Nash as Irene Maddox
- John Baer as Keith Burgess
- Anna Lee Carroll as Denise Colbert
- Robert Karnes as Joe Brady
- Peter Brocco as Steve Cresca
- Peter Virgo Jr. as Duke Maddox
- Gregory Irvin as Chris Colbert
- Emile Hamaty as Train Conductor

== Reception ==
The Monthly Film Bulletin wrote: "This melodrama of a skilfully engineered frame-up, with an unsuspecting secretary as victim, cleverly disguises its weaknesses and coincidences by carrying the audience along on the crest of swiftly mounting suspense and piled-up complications. Although the plot doesn't bear examination, it is enjoyably intriguing while one is watching. The acting is hardly more than adequate, but John Harding is effective as the villainous Milo."

== Bibliography ==
- Goble, Alan. The Complete Index to Literary Sources in Film. Walter de Gruyter, 1999.
