= The Adventures of Wild Bill Hickok =

American TV Western series (1951–1958)

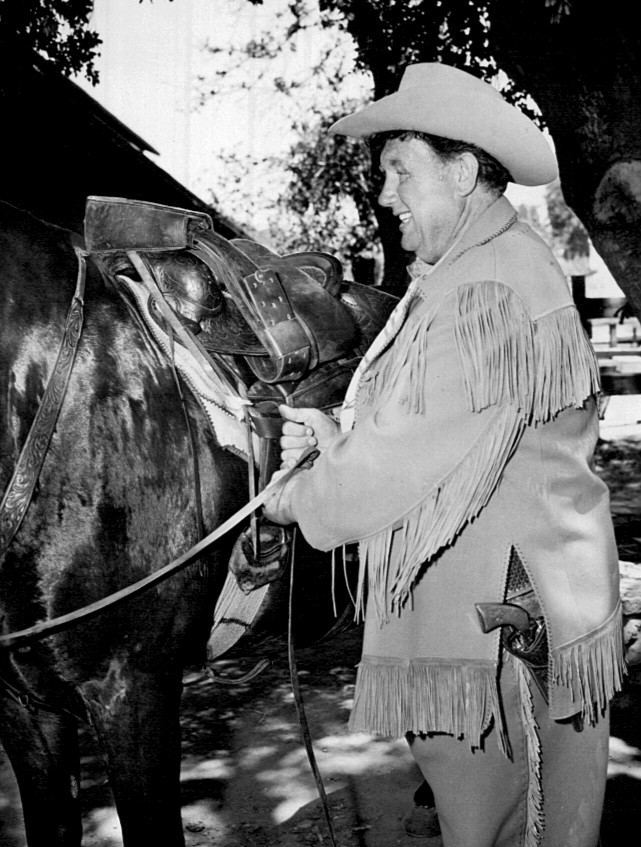
- Andy Devine as Jingles
- Genre: Western
- Directed by: Wesley Barry; William Beaudine; Thomas Carr; Will Jason; Louis King; S. Roy Luby; Jean Yarbrough
- Starring: Guy Madison; Andy Devine
- Country of origin: United States
- Original language: English
- No. of seasons: 8
- No. of episodes: 113 (list of episodes)

Production
- Producer: William F. Broidy
- Cinematography: Henry Freulich; John J. Martin; William A. Sickner
- Editors: Carl Pierson; S. Roy Luby
- Running time: 25 mins.
- Production company: Romson Productions

Original release
- Network: Syndication; CBS (1955-1958); ABC (1957-1958)
- Release: April 15, 1951 – September 24, 1958

The Adventures of Wild Bill Hickok is an American Western television series that ran for eight seasons from April 15, 1951, through September 24, 1958. The Screen Gems series began in syndication, but ran on CBS from June 5, 1955, through 1958, and, at the same time, on ABC from 1957 through 1958. The Kellogg's cereal company was the show's national sponsor. The series was also exported to Australia during the late 1950s.

== Synopsis ==
The Adventures of Wild Bill Hickok starred Guy Madison as the legendary Old West lawman (in real life, also a gunfighter) United States Marshal James Butler "Wild Bill" Hickok, and Andy Devine as his comedy sidekick, Jingles P. Jones. The series was set in the 1870s, with Hickok and Jones based at Fort Larabee.

== Production ==
The series was produced by William F. Broidy Productions. It consisted of 113 episodes, the last 13 of which were made in color. In 1957 Screen Gems bought the Broidy company's assets, which included 100 Hickok episodes on film. Tommy Carr was the director. Kellogg's cereals sponsored it.

== Episodes ==
Season	Episodes	Originally released	
Season	Episodes	First released	Last released
1	13	April 14, 1951	July 8, 1951
2	13	October 14, 1951	January 6, 1952
3	22	January 27, 1952	June 30, 1952
4	13	September 13, 1953	December 6, 1953
5	13	November 21, 1954	February 13, 1955
6	13	September 4, 1955	November 27, 1955
7	13	September 2, 1956	November 25, 1956
8	13	February 19, 1958	May 16, 1958

== Other media ==
Devine and Madison portrayed their roles on Mutual radio from April 1, 1951, to 1956.

During the 1950s, several episodes of the television show were spliced together and released as 16 feature films by Allied Artists.

Title	Director	Cast	Year
The Ghost of Crossbones Canyon	Frank McDonald	Russell Simpson, Gordon Jones, John Doucette	1952
Behind Southern Lines	Thomas Carr	Rand Brooks, Jonathan Hale	1952
Trail of the Arrow	Thomas Carr	Monte Blue, Terry Frost, Raymond Hatton	1952
The Yellow Haired Kid	Frank McDonald	William Edward Phipps, David Bruce, Marcia Mae Jones	1952
Border City Rustlers	Frank McDonald	Gloria Talbott, Isabel Randolph, George J. Lewis	1953
Secret of Outlaw Flats	Wesley Barry, Frank McDonald	Kristine Miller, John Crawford, Richard Avonde	1953
Six Gun Decision	Frank McDonald	Gloria Saunders, David Sharpe, Lyle Talbot	1953
Two Gun Marshal	Frank McDonald	Michael Vallon, Pamela Duncan, Francis McDonald	1953
Marshals In Disguise	Frank McDonald	Anthony Sydes, John Eldredge, Guy Beach	1954
Outlaw's Son	Frank McDonald	Sally Fraser, Robert Hyatt, Fred Kelsey	1954
Trouble on the Trail	Frank McDonald	Martha Hyer, Robert Blake, Byron Foulger	1954
The Two Gun Teacher	Frank McDonald	Carole Mathews, Ann Carroll, Rory Mallinson	1954
The Matchmaking Marshal	Frank McDonald	Bobby Jordan, Anna Lee Carroll, Forrest Taylor	1955
Phantom Trails	Wesley Barry, Frank McDonald	Byron Foulger, Robert Filmer, Harry Harvey Jr.	1955
Timber Country Trouble	Frank McDonald	Frances Charles, Henry Blair, Harry Lauter	1955
The Titled Tenderfoot	Frank McDonald	Jeanne Cagney, Marshall Reed, Clayton Moore	1955

== Guest stars ==
- Rayford Barnes
- Baynes Barron
- George Barrows
- Steve Clark
- Bill Coontz
- Steve Darrell
- William Fawcett
- Herman Hack
- Chick Hannan
- Carol Henry
- Robert 'Buzz' Henry
- I. Stanford Jolley
- Morgan Jones
- Ray Jones
- Fred Krone
- Carole Mathews
- Ken Mayer
- Ewing Mitchell
- Neyle Morrow
- Ethan Laidlaw
- Tex Palmer
- Mike Ragan
- Buddy Roosevelt
- Frank J. Scannell
- Fred Sherman
- Gloria Saunders
- George Sowards
- Boyd Stockman
- William Tannen
- Guy Teague

== Award nominations ==
Year	Award	Result	Category
1955	Emmy Award	Nominated	Best Western or Adventure Series
