= Marlowe (1969 film) =

1969 film by Paul Bogart

- Theatrical release poster
- Directed by: Paul Bogart
- Screenplay by: Stirling Silliphant
- Based on: The Little Sister; 1949 novel by Raymond Chandler
- Produced by: Sidney Beckerman; Gabriel Katzka
- Starring: James Garner; Gayle Hunnicutt; Carroll O'Connor; Rita Moreno; William Daniels
- Cinematography: William H. Daniels
- Edited by: Gene Ruggiero
- Music by: Peter Matz
- Distributed by: Metro-Goldwyn-Mayer
- Release dates: September 19, 1969 (Germany); October 22, 1969 (U.S.)
- Running time: 96 minutes
- Country: United States
- Language: English
- Box office: 496,076 tickets (Spain/France)

Marlowe is a 1969 American neo-noir film starring James Garner as Raymond Chandler's private detective Philip Marlowe. Directed by Paul Bogart, the film was written by Stirling Silliphant based on Chandler's 1949 novel The Little Sister. The supporting cast includes Gayle Hunnicutt, Carroll O'Connor, Rita Moreno, Bruce Lee, and William Daniels.

== Plot ==
Los Angeles private eye Philip Marlowe has been hired by Orfamay Quest, a young woman from Kansas, to find her brother, Orrin. Marlowe searches Orrin's former hotel room and interviews the shady hotel guest, Grant Hicks, he finds there. Returning downstairs he comes across the dead body of desk clerk, Haven Clausen, killed with an ice pick. Soon afterwards Hicks phones Marlowe to hire him to hold onto something for a day or two. When Marlowe gets to his location he finds Hicks dead with an ice pick buried in his neck. A masked, armed woman comes up behind Marlowe and knocks him out and flees. When he recovers, Marlowe searches the room and finds a claim ticket for a roll of photographs. He tells some of what happened to the police, but keeps the most important information to himself. Marlowe recalls that years earlier a crime gang in Brooklyn led by mobster Sonny Steelgrave had perfected a technique for killing its enemies with an ice pick, but they agree the connection is tenuous.

Marlowe tracks down the masked woman. She is television star Mavis Wald, and the photos are of her in a passionate rendezvous with the mobster boss Steelgrave, who has moved his operation west. Marlowe realizes that the murders stemmed from an initial attempt at blackmail. Marlowe calls on Wald, and while waiting to speak to her meets Wald’s friend, exotic dancer Dolores Gonzales. In private, Marlowe tells Wald his suspicion that she was at the hotel where Hicks was killed to pay him off, in return for the photos. He offers Wald his help, but she rejects it. Steelgrave makes several attempts to assault, scare or buy Marlowe off the case but they are all unsuccessful, resulting only in the death of an erudite Steelgrave henchman.

Orfamay tells Marlowe her brother is staying at the clinic of Dr. Vincent Lagardie, a connection Marlowe already knew of. He contacts an executive from Wald's hit TV show and secures a contract to work in her best interest. Marlowe questions Wald again, and from what he learns is able to clear her and Steelgrave of the murders. Marlowe then goes to the clinic and confronts the doctor, who tranquilizes him with a drugged cigarette but otherwise does not harm him. Marlowe comes to during the night and, still groggy, searches the clinic. He hears gunshots and stumbles upon the dying Orrin, who has just enough strength to stab Marlowe with an ice pick, although not seriously. Marlowe finds a photograph that reveals that Orfamay, Orrin and Wald are siblings. This makes Marlowe certain that Orrin was the blackmailer, who later killed Clausen and Hicks because they knew details of the blackmail scheme. Marlowe gets his wound tended to by Dolores. Now closely connected to another death, Marlowe is only able to keep the police at bay with a promise to solve the cases.

Marlowe returns to his office and burns the photos and negatives. He gets a visit from Dolores, who tells him Wald wants to see him at the mobster Steelgrave’s home. They leave watched by Dr. Lagardie. During their ride Marlowe learns that Dolores and Steelgrave had been romantically involved. Marlowe finds Steelgrave dead, and Wald disconsolate. She tells him she killed Steelgrave because he had her brother killed. To protect Wald's reputation, Marlowe makes it look as if Steelgrave committed suicide. However the police are not fooled, and the irate Lieutenant in charge resolves to have Marlowe’s private detective license revoked.

Marlowe catches Orfamay searching his home and tells her he has destroyed the photographs and negatives. Wald arrives and a heated confrontation between the women reveals that Orfamay knew about Orrin's blackmailing scheme and was expecting some money from it. When he disappeared she subsequently told Steelgrave where to find Orrin, in return for one thousand dollars. However she had expected Marlowe to stop Steelgrave from harming Orrin. Marlowe breaks up the fight between the sisters and manhandles the sobbing Orfamay out of his home, telling her to go back to Kansas. Wald admits to Marlowe, who had already deduced it, that she pretended to have killed Steelgrave to protect her sister, who she thought had actually killed him.

Marlowe confronts Dolores, from offstage while she is performing her nightclub act, with his suspicions that she was Orrin's original partner in the blackmail. She did so, Marlowe suggests, because she was still in love with Steelgrave and wanted to force him and Wald apart. He also tells Dolores he thinks she was once married to Dr. Lagardie, when he was a young doctor in Brooklyn. Still dancing on stage, Dolores, when she gets near the side curtain where Marlowe is standing, admits to everything. She is scornful of Marlowe having this knowledge, saying he will never tell the police, as it would destroy Wald’s career. Marlowe leaves the backstage area of the club just as Dr. Lagardie enters from a rear door. The two men see each other, without incident. Marlowe phones the police. Moments later Dr. Lagardie steps out and shoots Dolores dead. The doctor then shoots himself. Marlowe leaves the club before the police arrive.

== Cast ==
- James Garner as Philip Marlowe
- Gayle Hunnicutt as Mavis Wald
- Carroll O'Connor as Lt. Christy French
- Rita Moreno as Dolores Gonzáles
- Sharon Farrell as Orfamay Quest
- William Daniels as Mr. Crowell
- H. M. Wynant as Sonny Steelgrave
- Jackie Coogan as Grant W. Hicks
- Kenneth Tobey as Sgt. Fred Beifus
- Jason Wingreen as Camera Store Clerk
- Bruce Lee as Winslow Wong
- Christopher Cary as Chuck
- George Tyne as Oliver Hady
- Corinne Camacho as Julie
- Paul Stevens as Dr. Vincent Lagardie
- Roger Newman as Orrin Quest
- Anna Lee Carroll as Mona
- Read Morgan as Gumpshaw

== Production ==
In 1968, the last three (of the seven) Marlowe novels had not yet been filmed: The Little Sister, The Long Goodbye, and Playback. In March 1967, it was announced that film rights to Little Sister were purchased by the team of Katzka and Berne who had hired Stirling Silliphant to write a script; MGM would distribute. In June Katzka announced that he had also bought screen rights to The Long Goodbye and that filming on Little Sister would begin in September. However filming was delayed.

In March 1968, it was announced a film would be made of The Little Sister starring James Garner with Paul Bogart to make his debut as director. Garner had to plead his case to appear in the film after one MGM executive vetoed his role in the film. Gayle Hunnicut's casting was announced in June.

Filming started in July 1968. It took place in Los Angeles. Stirling Silliphant said he was interested in writing the script "because here was a chance to write the classic Quest story" and it would get the writer "out of the social conscience bag I'm supposed to be in." Silliphant said he had to create "90% of the dialogue" because he felt Chandler's original was "dated".

In his memoirs Garner says he ad libbed the words "impertinent" and "baroque" in one scene when his character was describing wine because Gore Vidal had just referenced Garner's backside in the novel Myra Breckinridge as "impertinent" and "baroque".

James Garner would go on to play a private detective in the NBC television series The Rockford Files (1974–1980). Over the course of the show Kenneth Tobey (2 times), William Daniels (2), Paul Stevens (2), Christopher Cary (2) and Corinne Camacho (4 times) made guest appearances in different roles. Rita Moreno appeared in 3 episodes as a prostitute named Rita Capkovic.

== Reception ==
=== Box office ===
In Europe, the film sold 375,668 tickets in Spain and 120,408 tickets in France, for a total of 496,076 tickets sold in Spain and France. The film's box-office performance in North America is currently unknown.

=== Critical reception ===
The film has a score of 73% on Rotten Tomatoes based on 11 reviews.

Roger Ebert gave the film two-and-a-half stars out of four and said it was "not very satisfactory. Even though director Paul Bogart shot on location, he has not quite captured the gritty quality of Chandler's LA. And James Garner, the latest Marlowe (after Robert Montgomery, Dick Powell and Humphrey Bogart), is a little too inclined to play for light, wry, James Bond-style laughs." Roger Greenspun of The New York Times wrote that "Stirling Silliphant's screenplay follows too many styles, and Paul Bogart's direction follows too few to make a more than casually entertaining movie." Gene Siskel of the Chicago Tribune gave the film one-and-a-half stars out of four and called it "a muddled disappointment. The plot, or more exactly the three or four subplots, is bewildering." Variety wrote, "Raymond chandler's private eye character, Philip Marlowe, is in need of better handling either producers Gabriel Katzka and Sidney Beckerman, scripter Stirling Silliphant or James Garner in title role, have provided, if he is to survive as a screen hero. 'Marlowe,' which MGM is releasing, is a plodding, unsure piece of so-called sleuthing in which Garner can never make up his mind whether to play it for comedy or hardboil. Silliphant's adaptation of author's 'The Little Sister' come[s] out on the confused side, with too much unexplained action." Kevin Thomas of the Los Angeles Times wrote that the film "fills that yawning gap between the blockbuster and the small-scale film of social consciousness in thoroughly satisfying fashion. Free from the giganticism of the first and the all-too-frequent pretensions of the second it is ideal escapist entertainment." Gary Arnold of The Washington Post called it "a tolerable detective thriller provided you haven't read any of Raymond Chandler's novels or seen Howard Hawks' film version of 'The Big Sleep.' If you have, it will be natural to write off this film as a half-hearted, anachronistic attempt to revive the genre." The Monthly Film Bulletin wrote, "Despite some crisp dialogue in Stirling Silliphant's screenplay, Chandler's novel The Little Sister suffers badly from glossy settings and modish direction ... And Marlowe himself seems a thoroughly synthetic creation—although Garner has a good line in 'cool', he has none of the heavy-lidded cynicism and crumpled charm with which Bogart made the part his own."
