= Jacques Bergerac =

French actor, businessman and executive (1927–2014)

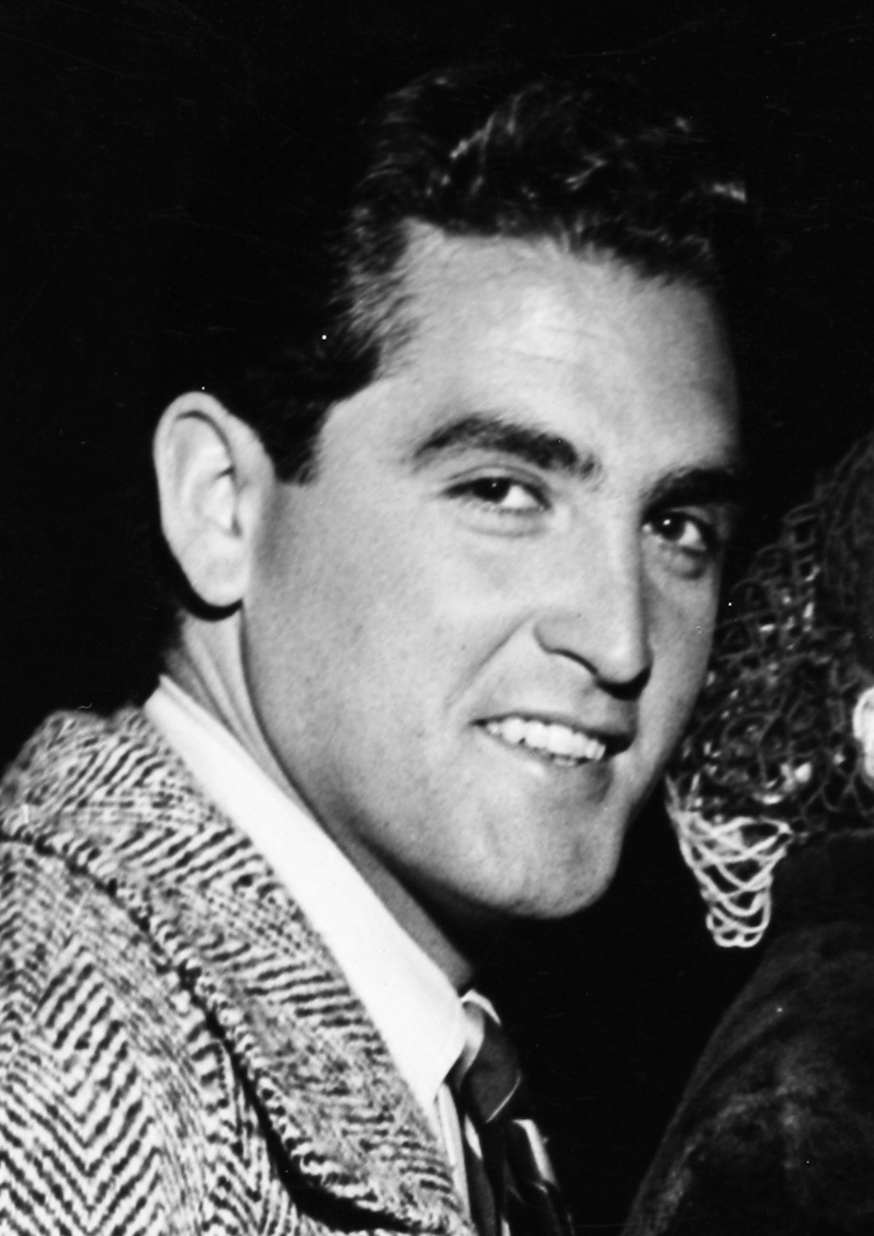
- Bergerac in the 1950s
- Born: 26 May 1927; Biarritz, Pyrénées-Atlantiques, France
- Died: 15 June 2014 (aged 87); Anglet, Pyrénées-Atlantiques, France
- Years active: 1954–1969
- Spouses: Ginger Rogers (m. 1953; div. 1957) Dorothy Malone (m. 1959; div. 1964)
- Children: 2
- Relatives: Michel Bergerac (brother)

Jacques Bergerac (26 May 1927 – 15 June 2014) was a French actor and businessman.

== Life and career ==
Jacques Bergerac was born in 1927 in Biarritz, France, the son of Alice (Romatet) and Charles Bergerac.

Bergerac was a law student when he met a vacationing Ginger Rogers in France. She got him a screen test at the Metro-Goldwyn-Mayer studios that led to their appearing together in Twist of Fate (1954) (also known as Beautiful Stranger). He then appeared as Armand Duval in a television production of Camille for Kraft Television Theatre, opposite Signe Hasso. He played the Comte de Provence in Jean Delannoy's film Marie Antoinette Queen of France.

In Strange Intruder (1956), he shared the screen with Edmund Purdom and Ida Lupino and in Les Girls (1957), he played the second male lead. He also appeared in Gigi (1958), Thunder in the Sun (1959), the cult horror film The Hypnotic Eye (1960) and A Global Affair (1964). In 1957, he received the Golden Globe Award for Foreign Newcomer.

He appeared in a few more films and on television in The Millionaire, Batman, 77 Sunset Strip, Alfred Hitchcock Presents (three episodes), The Lucy Show, Get Smart, The Dick Van Dyke Show and Perry Mason (Season 7, Episode 19). His last appearance was on an episode of The Doris Day Show in 1969, after which he left show business and became the head of Revlon's Paris office and of the Perfumes Balmain company. His younger brother Michel became CEO of Revlon six years later.

He also managed the rugby club Biarritz Olympique from 1980 until 1981.

== Personal life ==
Bergerac married screen star Ginger Rogers in February 1953, and they divorced in July 1957. In June 1959, he married actress Dorothy Malone in Hong Kong, where she was on location for her 1960 film The Last Voyage. They had daughters Mimi and Diane together, and divorced in December 1964.

He died on 15 June 2014 at his home in Anglet, Pyrénées-Atlantiques, France.

== Filmography ==
Year	Title	Role	Director	Notes
1954	Twist of Fate (Beautiful Stranger)	Pierre Clemont	David Miller	Co-starring with wife, Ginger Rogers
1956	Alfred Hitchcock Presents	Jan Gubak	Justus Addiss	Season 1 Episode 21: "Safe Conduct"
1956	Alfred Hitchcock Presents	Prince Burhan	James Neilson	Season 1 Episode 35: "The Legacy"
1956	Marie-Antoinette reine de France	Comte de Provence	Jean Delannoy	
1956	Strange Intruder	Howard Gray	Irving Rapper	
1957	Les Girls	Pierre Ducros	George Cukor	
1958	Alfred Hitchcock Presents	Sergeant Andre Doniere	Herschel Daugherty	Season 3 Episode 22: "The Return of the Hero"
1958	Un homme se penche sur son passé	Jacques Monge	Willy Rozier	
1958	Gigi	Sandomir	Vincente Minnelli	
1959	Thunder in the Sun	Pepe Dauphin	Russell Rouse	
1960	The Hypnotic Eye	Desmond	George Blair	
1961	Fear No More	Paul Colbert	Bernard Wiesen	
1962	Una domenica d'estate	Osvaldo	Giulio Petroni	
1962	The Fury of Achilles	Hector	Marino Girolami	
1963	The Dick Van Dyke Show	Jacques Savant	Jerry Paris	Season 2 Episode 25: “The Square Triangle”
1964	A Global Affair	Guy Duval	Jack Arnold	
1965	Hard Time for Princes	Sandro	Ettore Scola	
1965	Taffy and the Jungle Hunter	David Claveau	Terry O. Morse	
1966	Special Mission Lady Chaplin	Kobre Zoltan	Alberto De Martino and Sergio Grieco	
1966	The Unkissed Bride	Jacques Philippe	Jack H. Harris	
1967	Batman	Freddie the Fence	Robert Sparr	Season 2 Episode 50 - "Batman Displays His Knowledge"
