= Ninfield =

Village in East Sussex, England

Coordinates: 50.883°N 0.421°E

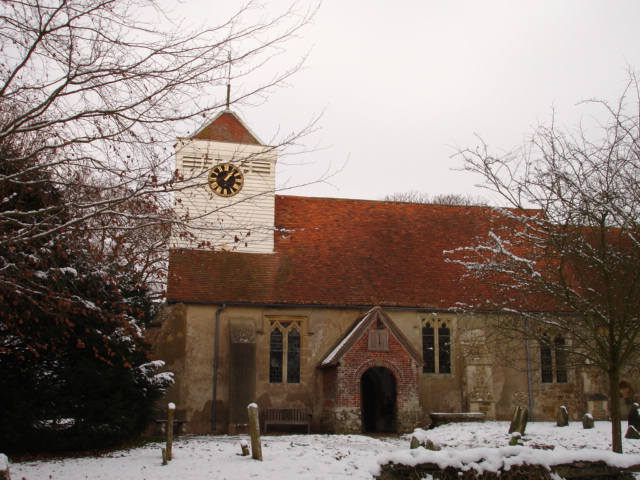
- Church of St Mary The Virgin, Ninfield

- Location within East Sussex
- Area: 10.6 km^{2} (4.1 sq mi)
- Population: 1,562 (2011)
  - Density: 372/sq mi (144/km^{2})
- OS grid reference: TQ706124
  - London: 49 miles (79 km) NNW
- District: Wealden
- Shire county: East Sussex
- Region: South East
- Country: England
- Sovereign state: United Kingdom
- Post town: BATTLE
- Postcode district: TN33
- Dialling code: 01424
- Police: Sussex
- Fire: East Sussex
- Ambulance: South East Coast
- UK Parliament: Bexhill and Battle

Ninfield is a village and civil parish in the Wealden District of East Sussex, England. The village is quite linear and centred 4 miles (6.4 km) north of Bexhill-on-Sea where two roads cross: the A269 from Bexhill to Battle and the A271 to Hailsham. The parish covers 2,500 acres (1,010 ha); approximately the northern half of which is in the High Weald AONB.

To the west of the village is Standard Hill, said to be the place that William the Conqueror placed his flag (2 lions of Normandy standard) before the Battle of Hastings. As with many other Wealden villages, it was involved in the iron industry: that fact is commemorated by the presence in the village of a set of iron stocks. Smuggling was also rife in the eighteenth century.

The village name is said to come from the fact that it was originally composed of nine and three quarter fields. A legal record, of 1452, mentioning a Sussex village as "Nempnefeld", may refer to Ninfield.

== Landmarks ==
Stocks and a whipping post made of Sussex iron are located by the village green.

== Amenities ==
Ninfield has a primary school, a shop and two pubs- The Kings Arms and the Blacksmiths Inn. It has two churches, its medieval parish church dedicated to St Mary the Virgin; and the Methodist church.

== Cultural references and former residents ==
Ninfield was once featured in an episode of the classic comedy The Goon Show entitled The Nadger Plague and first broadcast by the BBC in October 1956. In the episode, set in the 16th century, the residents of Ninfield were left terrified when two carriers of the titular plague, which caused the seats of peoples' trousers to "burn out", arrived in the village. The episode was written by Spike Milligan, a sometime resident of East Sussex.

James T.A. Osborne (d. 1979), painter, artistic print maker, etcher and engraver long settled in Ninfield.

== Local government ==
The parish council consists of nine councillors.

Ninfield is currently drawn, for the purposes of the fair apportionment of District Councillors as part of electoral ward: Ninfield and Hooe with Wartling. The population of this ward at the 2011 Census was 2,543.

== Built-up component ==
The central, contiguous area of 558 homes on 65 hectares has been identified as a small Built-up Area, in the statistical government bodies definition (ONS and GSS) and had in 2011 a total of 1,307 residents. Population density of this area was 20.1 persons per hectare.

== Notable people ==
eSports participant and sim-racer Jimmy Broadbent is from Ninfield.
