= The Little Sister =

Novel by Raymond Chandler

- First edition (UK)
- Author: Raymond Chandler
- Cover artist: Cecil W Bacon
- Language: English
- Series: Philip Marlowe
- Genre: Detective fiction
- Publisher: Hamish Hamilton (UK); Houghton Mifflin (US)
- Publication date: 1949
- Media type: Print (hardback and paperback)
- Pages: 256 pp
- Preceded by: The Lady in the Lake
- Followed by: The Long Goodbye

The Little Sister is a 1949 novel by Raymond Chandler, his fifth featuring the private investigator Philip Marlowe. The story is set in Los Angeles in the late 1940s and follows Marlowe's investigation of a missing persons case and blackmail scheme centered around a Hollywood starlet. With several scenes involving the film industry, the novel was partly inspired by Chandler's experience working as a screenwriter in Hollywood and his low opinion of the industry and most of the people in it. The book was first published in the UK in June 1949 and was released in the United States three months later, with Boris Artzybasheff creating the dust jacket art for the first U.S. edition.

== Plot summary ==
Orfamay Quest asks Philip Marlowe to search for her older brother Orrin, who has recently come out to work in Bay City. Starting with Orrin's last known address, Marlowe finds the superintendent there in a drunken stupor; when awoken he tries to call a Dr. Lagardie before passing out again. Marlowe then finds a man who claims to be a retired optometrist living in Orrin's old room. On leaving the building, Marlowe discovers the superintendent stabbed in the neck with an ice pick and reports the murder to the local police.

When Marlowe returns to his office, he gets an anonymous call offering him an easy $100 job. When he enters the caller's room at the Van Nuys Hotel, a blonde knocks him out with one of her high heels. He comes round to find the "retired optometrist" dead, also with an ice pick in his neck, and the room in disarray from a search. Marlowe remembers that the optometrist wears a toupée and finds a camera shop claim check hidden there. When he notifies the Los Angeles police of the murder, they recognize the victim as a minor player in organised crime.

Based on a tip from the hotel detective, Marlowe deduces that the woman in the hotel room was Mavis Weld, a rising movie star. He goes to her apartment, where he meets Dolores Gonzales, another minor star, who throws him out. After using the claim check to retrieve a set of photos of Weld and a reputed gangster named Steelgrave, Marlowe visits her agent and makes him understand that, far from trying to blackmail Weld, he may be able to help her.

Through his investigations, Marlowe learns that the photos were taken by Orrin, Orfamay's missing brother. He also finds out that Orrin is now working with a doctor named Lagardie who practices in Bay City. Marlowe confronts Lagardie, but as they talk he falls victim to a drugged cigarette. When he comes to, he finds Orrin trying to get into the room. Orrin has been shot and, with his last ounce of strength, tries to stab Marlowe with an ice pick. This confirms Marlowe's suspicion that Orrin committed the other murders.

Before calling the police, Marlowe tries to contact Orfamay to tell her of her brother's death. She informs him that she had found her brother and called the police after Marlowe left. Marlowe is now summoned to the station, where the police rough him up but, after an interview, he is released to "straighten things out" himself.

Dolores Gonzales calls Marlowe to say he must come to Steelgrave's home in the Hollywood Hills immediately, hinting that Mavis Weld's life is in danger. When Marlowe arrives, he finds Steelgrave has been killed with a gun of the same type that Mavis used to threaten Marlowe in the hotel room, and of the same calibre as the gun used to shoot Orrin. Weld confesses to Marlowe that she killed Steelgrave and is ready to turn herself in, but he persuades her to leave the gangster's home and then calls the police to report finding yet another body.

Although initially angry, the police are ultimately grateful to have the case resolved. After Weld goes to studio head Julius Oppenheimer, he hires lawyer Lee Farrell to defend her reputation. District Attorney Sewell Endicott summons Marlowe to a meeting with Farrell, Weld and himself and admits that the police do not have a convincing case against anybody. Back in his office, Marlowe is again visited by Orfamay. He confronts her with the truth that her real motive was to get money from Mavis Weld, who is her sister, and that it was she who told Steelgrave where to find Orrin.

Realising there is still one loose thread, Marlowe visits Dolores Gonzales at her apartment and she confesses to killing Steelgrave, her former lover. Marlowe realises that he cannot touch Dolores without destroying Mavis and her career and leaves, only to see Lagardie heading up to her room. Marlowe deduces that Lagardie was Dolores' former husband, but when he notifies the police where to locate him they find Lagardie has stabbed Dolores.

== Style ==
Chandler, along with Dashiell Hammett, defined the hardboiled school of detective fiction, popularised in pulp magazines such as Black Mask. The hardboiled school abandoned the genteel characters and elaborate intrigues found in the murder mysteries of authors such as Agatha Christie and Dorothy L. Sayers. Instead, they moved "murder out of the Venetian vase and into the alley" and "gave murder back to the kind of people that commit it for reasons, not just to provide a corpse; and with the means at hand, not with hand-wrought duelling pistols, curare, and tropical fish."

One thing that distinguished Chandler's hero Philip Marlowe even from his other hardboiled peers is that Marlowe often doesn't apprehend the criminal or explain every plot point at the end of the novel. Marlowe is a witness to events and, at most, is able to manipulate them in subtle ways to balance the scales of justice a bit. Nowhere is this more apparent than in The Little Sister. Marlowe is always arriving too late to prevent a murder or catch the criminal. Even at the very end, when he has finally solved the complex riddle of the case, his last act is simply to notify the police too late and let events take their course.

== Background ==
The Little Sister was the first novel Chandler wrote after working as a screenwriter for Paramount in Hollywood, and it reflects some of his experiences with and disdain for the film industry and particularly for Billy Wilder, his writing partner on Double Indemnity.

John Houseman, one of Chandler's few Hollywood friends, remembers one clash in particular, where the author stipulated in a complaint that "Mr Wilder was at no time to swish under Mr Chandler's nose or to point in his direction the thin, leather-handled malacca cane which Mr Wilder was in the habit of waving around while they worked."

Chandler used this experience in Chapter 18 of the novel, where Marlowe visits the office of Mavis Weld's agent (Chapter 18):

He walked away from me to a tall cylindrical jar in the corner. From this he took one of a number of short thin malacca canes. He began to walk up and down the carpet, swinging the cane deftly past his shoe.

I sat down again and killed my cigarette and took a deep breath. "It could only happen in Hollywood," I grunted.

He made a neat turn and glanced at me. "I beg your pardon."

"That an apparently sane man could walk up and down inside the house with a Picadilly stroll and a monkey stick in his hand."

== Themes ==
As in all of Chandler's novels, one of the major themes in The Little Sister is the love/hate relationship that Chandler had with Los Angeles and Hollywood. Much of the novel is devoted to mockery of the phoniness and self-importance of people in the film industry. And one of the most memorable passages in the book is a long soliloquy by Marlowe where he waxes philosophical about the emptiness and shallowness of Los Angeles and its residents. That section is punctuated by Marlowe saying to himself: "You're not human tonight, Marlowe."

At the same time, one of the villains of the novel, the one "who never looked less like Lady Macbeth," is not the film star of the Quest family, but the little sister, a mousy small town girl who ultimately cares more for the money she could make from her brother's photographs and blackmail than she did for her siblings. The heroine, who is willing to sacrifice herself and her career to protect others, and whom Marlowe ultimately rescues, is the jaded Hollywood starlet Mavis Weld.

== Adaptations ==
This story was updated for the 1969 film Marlowe, starring James Garner as detective Philip Marlowe.

The novel was adapted for radio by Bill Morrison, directed by John Tydeman, and broadcast on BBC Radio 4 on 5 December 1977, starring Ed Bishop as Marlowe.

The novel was adapted for the stage by Stuart Gordon and Carolyn Purdy Gordon in 1978, for a production at the Organic Theater in Chicago. Mike Genovese played Marlowe.

A DOS PC Adventure game was developed by Byron Preiss Multimedia in 1996 called "Private Eye". In the game, you can play from the original plot of Little Sister, or you can play an alternate adaptation of the story.

A graphic novel adaptation by Michael Lark was released as Raymond Chandler's Philip Marlowe: The Little Sister in 1997.

Another adaptation by Stephen Wyatt, directed by Claire Grove, was broadcast on BBC Radio 4 on 15 October 2011, starring Toby Stephens as Marlowe.
