= Manuel Padilla Jr. =

American actor

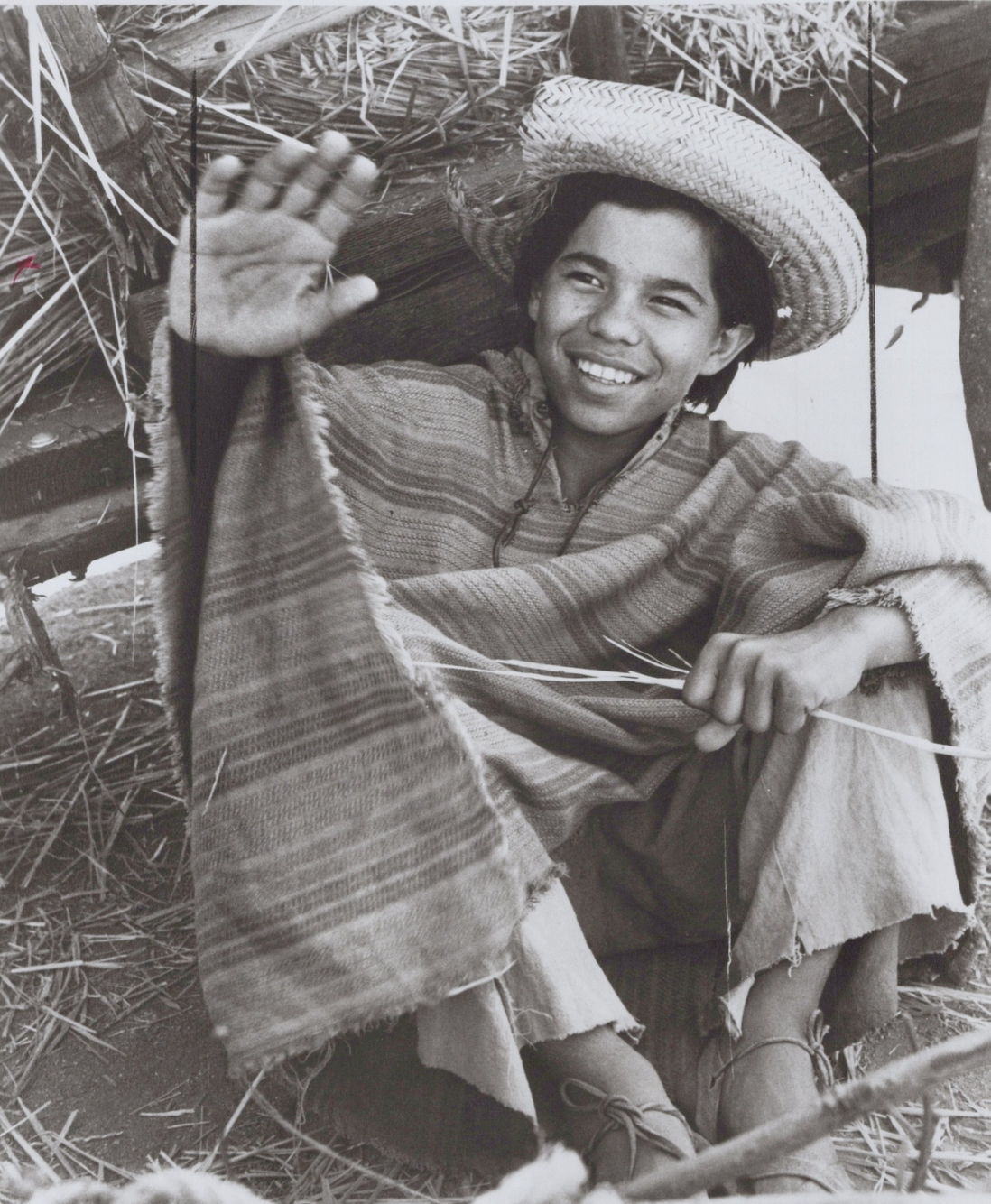
- Padilla Jr. in 1971
- Born: July 13, 1955; Los Angeles, California, U.S.
- Died: January 29, 2008 (aged 52); Pomona, California, U.S.
- Occupation: Actor
- Years active: 1963–1983

Manuel Padilla Jr. (July 13, 1955 – January 29, 2008) was an American child actor who began appearing in films at age 8. He is best remembered for playing Jai on the 1960s Tarzan television series starring Ron Ely. He also co-starred with Mike Henry in two mid-1960s "Tarzan" feature films. As a young adult, he appeared in American Graffiti (1973) as well as its 1979 sequel. He also appeared in episodes of Rawhide, Bonanza, Gunsmoke, Happy Days and The Flying Nun. His last role was a small part in Brian De Palma's 1983 film Scarface.

Manuel Padilla Jr. died from colon cancer on January 29, 2008, at age 52.

== Filmography ==
Year	Title	Role	Notes
1963	Dime with a Halo	Rafael	
1963	The Young and The Brave	Han	
1963	4 for Texas	Boy with Pea Shooter	Uncredited
1964	Robin and the 7 Hoods	Orphan Boy	Uncredited
1965	Sylvia	Pancho	Uncredited
1965	Taffy and the Jungle Hunter	Beau	
1965	Black Spurs	Manuel Reese	
1966	Tarzan and the Valley of Gold	Ramel	
1967	Tarzan and the Great River	Pepe	
1970	A Man Called Horse	Leaping Buck	
1970	The Great White Hope	Paco	
1970	Cutter's Trail (TV Movie)	Paco Avila	
1973	American Graffiti	Carlos	
1979	More American Graffiti	Carlos	
1978	Cotton Candy	Julio Sanchez	
1983	Scarface	Kid #2	(final film role)

== See also ==
- List of former child actors from the United States
