= The Young and The Brave =

1963 film by Francis D. Lyon

- Film poster
- Directed by: Francis D. Lyon
- Written by: Ronald Davidson; Beirne Lay, Jr. Harry M. Slott
- Produced by: A.C. Lyles
- Starring: Rory Calhoun; William Bendix; Richard Jaeckel; Manuel Padilla, Jr.
- Cinematography: Emmett Bergholz
- Edited by: Robert Leo
- Music by: Ronald Stein
- Distributed by: Metro-Goldwyn-Mayer
- Release date: 1963
- Running time: 84 minutes
- Country: United States
- Language: English

The Young and The Brave (also known by the working title Attong) is a feature film released in 1963 by Metro-Goldwyn-Mayer which depicts the quality of bravery of a group of prisoners of war that escaped North Korean capture, their youthful companion, and his dog during their journey to the American lines.

Starring Rory Calhoun, William Bendix, Richard Jaeckel, and Manuel Padilla, Jr., it was written by Ronald Davidson, Beirne Lay, Jr., and Harry M. Slott, directed by Francis D. Lyon and produced by A.C. Lyles.

Shot on location in Ventura County, California, the film has been recognized by Turner Classic Movies (TCM) as a historical representation of the war film genre. Preserved in their archives in 2006, the film is widely distributed through the network.

== Plot ==
During the Korean War, three American prisoners of war – MSgt Ed Brent (Rory Calhoun), Sgt Peter Kane (William Bendix), and Pvt Kirk Wilson (Robert Ivers) – escape from their North Korean captors and try to make it back to American lines, about 40 mi (64 km) away. At the beginning of their trek, they are given shelter by a Korean couple, who have a young son Han (Manuel Padilla). While Han is hiding in nearby hills, the North Korean captors who are pursuing the three escapees kill the couple. The three Americans elude the North Korean pursuers and encounter Han with his companion dog Lobo (Flame, German Shepherd), an abandoned K-9 corps police dog.

While eating some of their few K-rations, which the three share with Han and the dog, the three Americans discuss whether they should bring Han and the dog with them on their trek to the American lines. Brent is in favor of bringing them along and, as ranking officer, orders the other two to do so. Kane opposes bringing the boy and the dog because of the drain they would pose on their few rations. Kane appeals to Wilson to out-vote Brent, based on the assertion that after being held captive, rank no longer matters. Wilson, showing no conviction either way, sides with Kane. However, they eventually agree with Brent and the five proceed on the trek.

Along the way, Han confides to Kane that he doesn’t like him because Kane didn’t try to save his parents from the North Koreans. Kane convinces Han that there wasn’t anything they could do as escaped prisoners with no weapons. Kane befriends Han and leads him to believe that he could be adopted and go to America.

Cpl John Estway (Richard Jaeckel), a fourth escaped prisoner who was brainwashed, is encountered on their trek. He is carrying a two-way radio recovered from a broken-down Jeep, but the batteries that powered it have been depleted. They agree the radio would be useful in summoning help, if they could find replacement batteries.

While traveling through brush, Wilson, who is in the lead, steps on a land mine and is killed. Han starts to return to the three remaining men, but is prevented from stepping on a second land mine by the dog Lobo, who is able to sense it through smell. They decide Lobo would be a valuable resource and use him to sniff out more land mines along their path.

After running out of K-rations, they split up to search for food. Han discovers a wild pig in a thicket, which Kane captures and kills. While discussing how to cook it, someone suggests that they first skin it. Han asks if they have pigs in America and says you don’t skin a pig but rather roast it whole over an open fire. After doing so and enjoying a wonderful meal, they muse about how bright Han is for a child that they figure to be 9 or 10 years old.

They come upon a grass-thatched farmhouse and wonder whether it is occupied. Upon seeing a radio antenna on the roof, they surmise that they might find batteries for their radio inside. They hesitate to approach the house because enemy North Koreans might occupy it. Han suggests that he should go and ask for food under the assumption that the enemy, if there, would take him as an innocent child. The men are amazed at how clever and brave the boy is and agree to his plan. There are enemy soldiers inside, and they react violently to the presence of the boy. They come out, shoot the boy in the leg and search for the suspected escapees. Two of the enemy approach the three hidden Americans, who ambush them. Kane and Estway don the fallen enemy’s uniforms and pretend to hold Brent under arrest. The three approach the other North Korean soldiers and when they get close, they open fire and kill them all. The wounded boy meanwhile has fled to escape the North Koreans.

After finding batteries in the farmhouse, they make radio contact with a nearby American base, which sends a helicopter to pick them up. They search for Han, but can't find him. The helicopter arrives but the three prisoners of war won't leave without the boy. The helicopter pilot informs them that he can only carry two of them at a time and insists that two of them get aboard. Eventually Estway gets aboard alone and the helicopter flies away. The other two continue to search for Han. The helicopter returns shortly under gunpoint from Estway and drops a note saying that Han was spotted in the next canyon, which has been infiltrated by many enemy soldiers and would soon be under barrage by American forces. Brent and Kane hike to that canyon and spot Han, but are caught under fire by both sides. In the process, the dog Lobo is fatally shot and Brent is wounded in the knee. They reach Han and shortly later are rescued by American infantrymen.

After being transported to the American base camp, they are charged with disobeying orders to board the helicopter and Estway is charged for holding the pilot at gunpoint. Kane, however, insists on explaining the entire situation to the commanding colonel who finally agrees they are really heroes. The commander discovers that Han is only seven years old and marvels at how young and brave he is. Kane tells Han that he still has two years left in his enlistment and won’t be able to adopt Han and take him to America. However, Kane convinces both the boy and Brent that Brent should adopt the boy since Brent would be returning to America shortly because of his wound. Han leaves with Brent to the hospital and Kane is left displaying a feeling of accomplishment at the end.

== Cast ==
- Rory Calhoun as MSgt. Ed Brent
- William Bendix as Sgt. Peter L. Kane
- Richard Jaeckel as Cpl. John Estway
- Manuel Padilla, Jr. as Han
- Richard Arlen as Col. Ralph Holbein
- John Agar as Intelligence officer
- Robert Ivers as Pvt. Kirk Wilson
- Weaver Levy as Communist soldier
- Dennis Richards as Stretcher bearer
- Robert Goshen as Lieut. Ulysses Nero
- Willard Lee as Han's father
- Flame as Lobo the dog

== Reviews ==
The film has been reviewed by the Classic Film Guide, who summarized the plot and related the film to a television production. The reviewer states: "Though it's far from the worst movie I've ever seen, I would have felt gypped if I'd paid to see it."

== Release ==
Although the film was released on its own in August 1963, it was re-released later that same year as the second feature to the first James Bond adventure Dr. No double bill in many American markets.

== See also ==
- List of American films of 1963
