= List of The Adventures of Wild Bill Hickok episodes =

The Adventures of Wild Bill Hickok is an American Western television series that ran for eight seasons from April 15, 1951, through September 24, 1958. The Screen Gems series began in syndication, but ran on CBS from June 5, 1955, through 1958, and, at the same time, on ABC from 1957 through 1958. The Kellogg's cereal company was the show's national sponsor. The series was also exported to Australia during the late 1950s.

== Series overview ==
Season	Episodes	Originally released	
Season	Episodes	First released	Last released
1	13	April 14, 1951	July 8, 1951
2	13	October 14, 1951	January 6, 1952
3	22	January 27, 1952	June 30, 1952
4	13	September 13, 1953	December 6, 1953
5	13	November 21, 1954	February 13, 1955
6	13	September 4, 1955	November 27, 1955
7	13	September 2, 1956	November 25, 1956
8	13	February 19, 1958	May 16, 1958

== Episodes ==
=== Season 1 (1951) ===
No. overall	No. in season	Title	Directed by	Written by	Original release date
1	1	"Behind Southern Lines aka Civil War Story"	Thomas Carr	Story by : Melvin Levy and Maurice Tombragel; Teleplay by : Melvin Levy and Maurice Tombragel	April 14, 1951
2	2	"The Rock Springs Rustlers"	Thomas Carr	Story by : Teleplay by : Melvin Levy	April 22, 1951
3	3	"Lady Mayor aka the Spinster Mayor"	Thomas Carr	Story by : Teleplay by : Melvin Levy and Maurice Tombragel	April 29, 1951
4	4	"The Dog Collar aka Trap of Diamonds"	Thomas Carr	Story by : Teleplay by : Melvin Levy and Maurice Tombragel	May 6, 1951
5	5	"The Silver Mine Protection Story aka The Western Shakedown"	Thomas Carr	Story by : Teleplay by : Maurice Tombragel	May 13, 1951
6	6	"Indian Bureau Story"	Thomas Carr	Story by : Teleplay by : Melvin Levy and Maurice Tombragel	May 20, 1951
7	7	"Indian Pony Express"	Thomas Carr	Story by : Teleplay by : Maurice Tombragel	May 27, 1951
8	8	"The Tax Collecting Story aka The Brimstone Story"	Frank McDonald	Story by : Teleplay by : Maurice Tombragel	June 3, 1951
9	9	"The Widow Muldane aka Branding Iron Trail"	Frank McDonald	Story by : Teleplay by : Maurice Tombragel	June 10, 1951
10	10	"Ghost Town Story"	Frank McDonald	Story by : Teleplay by : Maurice Tombragel	June 17, 1951
11	11	"Yellow Haired Kid aka Double Identity"	Frank McDonald	Story by : Teleplay by : Dwight V. Babcock	June 24, 1951
12	12	"Johnny Deuce aka Bitter Creek Masquerade"	Frank McDonald	Story by : Teleplay by : Maurice Tombragel	July 1, 1951
13	13	"Homer Atchison aka Kansas Kid"	Frank McDonald	Story by : Teleplay by : Dwight V. Babcock	July 8, 1951

=== Season 2 (1951-52) ===
No. overall	No. in season	Title	Directed by	Written by	Original release date
14	1	"The Boulder City Election aka Border City Election"	Frank McDonald	Story by : Teleplay by : Bill Raynor	October 14, 1951
15	2	"Pony Express Vs. Telegraph"	Frank McDonald	Story by : Teleplay by : Bill Raynor	October 21, 1951
16	3	"The Lady School Teacher"	Frank McDonald	Story by : Teleplay by : Thomas W. Blackburn and Todhunter Ballard	October 28, 1951
17	4	"Outlaw Flats"	Frank McDonald	Story by : Teleplay by : Bill Raynor	November 4, 1951
18	5	"Silver Stage Holdup"	Frank McDonald	Story by : Teleplay by : Bill Raynor	November 11, 1951
19	6	"Mexican Rustlers Story"	Frank McDonald	Story by : Teleplay by : Bill Raynor	November 18, 1951
20	7	"Masked Riders"	Frank McDonald	Story by : Teleplay by : Thomas W. Blackburn and Todhunter Ballard	November 25, 1951
21	8	"Hepsibah"	Frank McDonald	Story by : Teleplay by : Bill Raynor	December 2, 1951
22	9	"Border City"	Frank McDonald	Story by : Teleplay by : Bill Raynor	December 9, 1951
23	10	"Ex-Convict Story aka The Innocent Cowpoke"	Wesley E. Barry	Story by : Teleplay by : Bill Raynor	December 16, 1951
24	11	"Papa Antonelli aka Jingles' Disguise"	Frank McDonald	Story by : Teleplay by : Bill Raynor	December 23, 1951
25	12	"The Slocum Family aka Education and Brawn"	Frank McDonald	Story by : Teleplay by : Maurice Tombragel	December 30, 1951
26	13	"Lost Indian Mine aka The Evil Assayer"	Frank McDonald	Story by : Teleplay by : Bill Raynor	January 6, 1952

=== Season 3 (1952) ===
No. overall	No. in season	Title	Directed by	Written by	Original release date
27	1	"Civilian Clothes Story"	Frank McDonald	Story by : Teleplay by : Maurice Tombragel	January 27, 1952
28	2	"Medicine Show"	Frank McDonald	Story by : Teleplay by : Bill Raynor	February 3, 1952
29	3	"Blacksmith Story"	Frank McDonald	Story by : Teleplay by : Bill Raynor	February 10, 1952
30	4	"Mexican Gun Running Show"	Frank McDonald	Story by : Teleplay by : Bill Raynor	February 17, 1952
31	5	"School Teacher Story"	Wesley E. Barry	Story by : Teleplay by : Bill Raynor	February 24, 1952
32	6	"Vigilante Story aka Brave Lash Corby"	Wesley E. Barry	Story by : Teleplay by : Bill Raynor	March 3, 1952
33	7	"The Professor's Daughter aka Flashy Sweetwater Singer"	Frank McDonald	Story by : Teleplay by : Maurice Tombragel	March 10, 1952
34	8	"Photographer's Story"	Frank McDonald	Story by : Teleplay by : Bill Raynor	March 17, 1952
35	9	"The Outlaw's Son"	Frank McDonald	Story by : Teleplay by : Maurice Tombragel	March 24, 1952
36	10	"Savvy, The Smart Little Dog"	Frank McDonald	Story by : Teleplay by : Maurice Tombragel	March 31, 1952
37	11	"Ghost Rider"	Wesley E. Barry	Story by : Teleplay by : Bill Raynor	April 7, 1952
38	12	"Rustling Stallion aka Wild White Horse"	Wesley E. Barry	Story by : Teleplay by : Bill Raynor and Samuel F. Roeca	April 14, 1952
39	13	"Lumber Camp Story"	Wesley E. Barry	Story by : Teleplay by : Bill Raynor	April 21, 1952
40	14	"The Trapper Story"	Frank McDonald	Story by : Teleplay by : Bill Raynor	April 28, 1952
41	15	"The Boy And The Bandit"	Wesley E. Barry	Story by : Teleplay by : Robert Raynor	May 5, 1952
42	16	"A Joke On Sir Anthony"	Frank McDonald	Story by : Teleplay by : Maurice Tombragel	May 12, 1952
43	17	"Wrestling Story"	Frank McDonald	Story by : Teleplay by : Bill Raynor	May 19, 1952
44	18	"Jingles Becomes A Baby Sitter"	Frank McDonald	Story by : Teleplay by : Maurice Tombragel	May 26, 1952
45	19	"The Fortune Telling Story aka The Ghost Breakers"	Frank McDonald	Story by : Teleplay by : Maurice Tombragel	June 9, 1952
46	20	"A Close Shave For The Marshall"	Frank McDonald	Story by : Teleplay by : Maurice Tombragel	June 16, 1952
47	21	"Prairie Flats Land Swindle aka Swindlers"	Frank McDonald	Story by : Teleplay by : Maurice Tombragel	June 23, 1952
48	22	"Marriage Feud At Ponca City"	Frank McDonald	Story by : Teleplay by : Maurice Tombragel	June 30, 1952

=== Season 4 (1953) ===
No. overall	No. in season	Title	Directed by	Written by	Original release date
49	1	"Grandpa And Genie"	William Beaudine Jr.	Story by : Teleplay by : Maurice Tombragel	September 13, 1953
50	2	"The Nephew From Back East"	William Beaudine Jr.	Story by : Teleplay by : Maurice Tombragel	September 20, 1953
51	3	"Wagon Wheel Trail"	William Beaudine Jr.	Story by : Teleplay by : Robert Leslie Bellem	September 27, 1953
52	4	"Heading For Trouble"	William Beaudine Jr.	Story by : Teleplay by :	October 4, 1953
53	5	"The Young Witness"	William Beaudine Jr.	Story by : Teleplay by : Robert Abel and Lee Bachman	October 11, 1953
54	6	"Chain Of Events"	William Beaudine Jr.	Story by : Teleplay by :	October 18, 1953
55	7	"The Doctor's Story"	William Beaudine Jr.	Story by : Teleplay by : Robert Abel and Lee Bachman	October 25, 1953
56	8	"The Indians And The Delegates"	William Beaudine Jr.	Story by : Teleplay by :	November 1, 1953
57	9	"The Sheriff Was A Redhead"	William Beaudine Jr.	Story by : Teleplay by : Jack Laird	November 8, 1953
58	10	"Hands Across The Border"	William Beaudine Jr.	Story by : Teleplay by : Robert Leslie Bellem and Herbert Madt	November 15, 1953
59	11	"The Avenging Gunman"	William Beaudine Jr.	Story by : Teleplay by : Robert Abel and Lee Bachman	November 22, 1953
60	12	"The Right Of Way"	William Beaudine Jr.	Story by : Teleplay by :	November 29, 1953
61	13	"Monster In The Lake"	William Beaudine Jr.	Story by : Teleplay by : Maurice Tombragel	December 6, 1953

=== Season 5 (1954-55) ===
No. overall	No. in season	Title	Directed by	Written by	Original release date
62	1	"The Maverick"	Frank McDonald	Story by : Teleplay by :	November 21, 1954
63	2	"The Kid From Red Butte"	Frank McDonald	Story by : Teleplay by :	November 28, 1954
64	3	"Masquerade At Moccasin Flats"	Frank McDonald	Story by : Teleplay by :	December 5, 1954
65	4	"Stolen Church Funds"	Frank McDonald	Story by : Teleplay by :	December 12, 1954
66	5	"Ol' Pardner Rides Again"	Unknown	Story by : Teleplay by :	December 19, 1954
67	6	"The Gorilla Of Owl Hoot Mesa"	Frank McDonald	Story by : Teleplay by : Robert Raynor and Bill Raynor	December 26, 1954
68	7	"Superstition Stage"	Frank McDonald	Story by : Teleplay by : Eric Freiwald and Robert Schaefer	January 2, 1955
69	8	"Cry Wolf"	Frank McDonald	Story by : Teleplay by :	January 9, 1955
70	9	"The Boy And The Hound Dog"	Unknown	Story by : Teleplay by :	January 16, 1955
71	10	"The Sheriff's Secret"	Frank McDonald	Story by : Teleplay by : Eric Freiwald and Robert Schaefer	January 23, 1955
72	11	"To The Highest Bidder"	Frank McDonald	Story by : Teleplay by : Ande Lamb	January 30, 1955
73	12	"Sundown Valley"	Frank McDonald	Story by : Teleplay by :	February 6, 1955
74	13	"Sagebrush Manhunt"	Unknown	Story by : Teleplay by :	February 13, 1955

=== Season 6 (1955) ===
No. overall	No. in season	Title	Directed by	Written by	Original release date
75	1	"Outlaw's Portrait"	Frank McDonald	Story by : Teleplay by : Eric Freiwald and Robert Schaefer	September 4, 1955
76	2	"Buckshot Comes Home"	Frank McDonald	Story by : Teleplay by : Adele Buffington and Maurice Tombragel	September 11, 1955
77	3	"The Music Teacher"	Frank McDonald	Story by : Teleplay by :	September 18, 1955
78	4	"The Golden Rainbow"	Jean Yarbrough	Story by : Teleplay by :	September 25, 1955
79	5	"Old Cowboys Never Die"	Jean Yarbrough	Story by : Teleplay by :	October 2, 1955
80	6	"Blake's Kid"	Jean Yarbrough	Story by : Teleplay by :	October 9, 1955
81	7	"Treasure Trail"	Jean Yarbrough	Story by : Teleplay by :	October 16, 1955
82	8	"Battle Line"	Jean Yarbrough	Story by : Teleplay by :	October 23, 1955
83	9	"Ambush"	Jean Yarbrough	Story by : Teleplay by :	October 30, 1955
84	10	"The Hideout"	Jean Yarbrough	Story by : Teleplay by : Warren Wilson	November 6, 1955
85	11	"Ghost Town Lady"	Jean Yarbrough	Story by : Teleplay by :	November 13, 1955
86	12	"The Mountain Men"	Unknown	Story by : Teleplay by : Eric Friewald and Robert Schaefer	November 20, 1955
87	13	"Return Of Chief Red Hawk"	Unknown	Story by : Teleplay by :	November 27, 1955

=== Season 7 (1956) ===
No. overall	No. in season	Title	Directed by	Written by	Original release date
88	1	"Halley's Comet"	Jean Yarbrough	Story by : Teleplay by : Warren Wilson	September 2, 1956
89	2	"Blind Alley"	Jean Yarbrough	Story by : Teleplay by :	September 9, 1956
90	3	"The Great Obstacle Race"	Jean Yarbrough	Story by : Teleplay by : Warren Wilson	September 16, 1956
91	4	"The Kangaroo Kaper"	Jean Yarbrough	Story by : Teleplay by : Samuel F. Roeca	September 23, 1956
92	5	"The Missing Diamonds"	Jean Yarbrough	Story by : Teleplay by :	September 30, 1956
93	6	"Jingles Gets The Bird"	Unknown	Story by : Teleplay by :	October 7, 1956
94	7	"Wild Bill's Odyssey"	Will Jason	Story by : Teleplay by : Warren Wilson	October 14, 1956
95	8	"The Bold Raven Rodeo"	Will Jason	Story by : Teleplay by : Samuel F. Roeca	October 21, 1956
96	9	"The Rainmaker"	Will Jason	Story by : Teleplay by : Samuel F. Roeca and Jack Speirs	October 28, 1956
97	10	"The Iron Major"	Will Jason	Story by : Teleplay by : Lee Irwin	November 4, 1956
98	11	"Jingles Wins A Friend"	Will Jason	Story by : Teleplay by : Samuel F. Roeca	November 11, 1956
99	12	"The Gattling Gun"	Will Jason	Story by : Teleplay by : Samuel F. Roeca	November 18, 1956
100	13	"The Steam Wagon"	Will Jason	Story by : Teleplay by : Samuel F. Roeca	November 25, 1956

=== Season 8 (1958) ===
No. overall	No. in season	Title	Directed by	Written by	Original release date
101	1	"Marvin's Mix-Up"	Louis King	Story by : Teleplay by : Joe Richardson	February 19, 1958
102	2	"Spurs For Johnny"	Louis King	Story by : Teleplay by : Barry Shipman	February 26, 1958
103	3	"Monkeyshines"	Louis King	Story by : Teleplay by : Paul Gangelin	March 5, 1958
104	4	"The Runaway Wizard"	Louis King	Story by : Teleplay by : Robert Schaefer and Eric Freiwald	March 12, 1958
105	5	"Meteor Mesa"	Louis King	Story by : Teleplay by : Barry Shipman	March 19, 1958
106	6	"Town Without Law"	Louis King	Story by : Teleplay by : Joe Richardson	March 26, 1958
107	7	"The Sheriff Of Buckeye"	Louis King	Story by : Teleplay by : Samuel F. Roeca and Barry Shipman	April 2, 1958
108	8	"Clem's Reformation"	Louis King	Story by : Teleplay by : Paul Gangelin	April 9, 1958
109	9	"Jingles On The Jailroad"	Louis King	Story by : Teleplay by : Ray Buffum	April 16, 1958
110	10	"The Daughter Of Casey O'Grady"	Louis King	Story by : Teleplay by : Robert Schaefer and Eric Freiwald	April 23, 1958
111	11	"The Angel Of Cedar Mountain"	Louis King	Story by : Teleplay by : Peter Dixon	April 30, 1958
112	12	"The Good Indian"	Louis King	Story by : Teleplay by : Ray Buffum	May 9, 1958
113	13	"The Counterfeit Ghost"	Louis King	Story by : Teleplay by : Joe Richardson	May 16, 1958
