= Eric Slater =

British printer

Eric Brindley Slater (1896 – 13 March 1963) was an English printmaker.

== Biography ==
Eric Slater was a colour woodcut artist who had an international reputation in the 1920s and 1930s. The son of a silversmith, he was born in Hampstead, London. When he was eight, his father died and he moved with his mother to East Sussex, first to Bexhill-on-Sea, then to Winchelsea, and finally, in 1929, to Seaford. He attended the Hastings School of Art.

Notable for their beautifully observed skies, many of Slater's prints are inspired by the South Downs and the coastline near his home. His printmaking was revered during his relatively short career, and much admired by Campbell Dodgson, then Keeper of Prints and Drawings at the British Museum. Slater was a member of the Society of Graver Printers in Colour and the Society of Print Makers of California. His work was exhibited in England (by the New Society of Artists), Canada, Australia, New Zealand, Austria and South Africa, but he stopped making woodcuts soon after the death of his mother in 1938.

By the time Slater died in 1963, he had sunk into obscurity. With no close surviving relatives, a priest organised his burial in Seaford. An exhibition of his landscapes was held at the Towner Gallery in Eastbourne, East Sussex, in 2012 – the first public display of his work for 70 years. Exhibitions in Seaford and Lewes followed in 2013, that year being the 50th anniversary of Slater's death, and Slater's work continues to be exhibited and publicised.

Slater's prints are held by the British Museum and the Victoria and Albert Museum, and can also be found in national museums in Canada and New Zealand. The Towner exhibition helped revive interest in his work and the output of other British artists who used Japanese techniques to make colour woodcuts – a printing method introduced to the UK by Frank Morley Fletcher (1866–1949) in the 1890s. A book about Slater by James Trollope, called Slater's Sussex, has been published in association with the Towner Gallery. Slater was taught the Japanese woodcut technique by his Sussex neighbour Arthur Rigden Read (1879–1955). The work of both artists was shown at the Hastings Museum and Art Gallery in 2017 in an exhibition called A Sussex Wave from Japan.
