= James T. A. Osborne =

British painter, original printmaker, etcher and engraver (1907–1979)

James T. A. Osborne RE
- Born: James Thomas Armour Osborne; 13 January 1907; Ninfield, East Sussex, England
- Died: 16 April 1979 (aged 72); Orsett, Essex, England
- Education: Hastings School of Art; Royal College of Art
- Known for: Painting
- Style: Wildlife art
- Spouse: Charlotte Ellen Gibson (m. 1937)

James Thomas Armour Osborne RE (13 January 1907 – 16 April 1979) was a British painter, original printmaker, etcher and engraver known for his ornithological and wildlife prints. He was a student at the Royal College of Art, a Rome Scholar, a Fellow of the Royal Society of Painter-Etchers (now Royal Society of Painter-Printmakers) and a founder of the Society of Wildlife Artists.

== Early life and education ==
James Thomas Armour Osborne was born in Ninfield, East Sussex, on 13 January 1907, the son of a Scottish farmer who migrated to England at the beginning of the century. Throughout his early life he spent much of his time in the surrounding countryside of his parents’ farm, watching and sketching wildlife of every kind. This led Osborne to study at Hastings School of Art, concentrating on sculpture, which he nearly made his career path. During his time at Hastings he won a scholarship to the Royal College of Art where he found that the medium of print suited him better and in his final year made the switch to the Print School, then under the direction of Malcolm Osborne. He went on to gain the highest accolade, the Prix de Rome Scholarship in Engraving.

== Career ==
In 1932 he returned to England and took a position teaching at the Polytechnic School of Art in Regent Street.

In 1946 Osborne was elected an A.R.E a member of the Royal Society of Painter-Etchers (now Royal Society of Painter-Printmakers) and elected a fellow (R.E) in 1957. He exhibited regularly with the society. His works were exhibited at the Royal Academy Summer Exhibition twenty-four times between 1936 and 1970. His work was shown throughout regional galleries in the UK and in the US and he was also included within Arts Council touring exhibitions in Europe.

In 1964, together with Eric Ennion, Robert Gilmore, Elieen Soper, and Keith Shackleton, he founded the Society of Wildlife Artists and was a regular exhibitor with the Society at the Mall Galleries, London.

Osborne’s works are a combination of colour wood engravings, linocuts and silk screens prints, illustrating a range of wildlife, with a special emphasis towards birds. They are bold, interpretive and large scale, rich in colour and detail. Throughout his career, Osborne constantly experimented with all forms of print and paper and his editions never exceeded thirty. The large woodcuts and linocuts are in direct contrast with the small delicate black and white wood engravings of his earlier works.

== Personal life and death ==
On 18 December 1937 he married the sculptor Charlotte Ellen Gibson (1902–1994) also a Rome Scholar and a fellow of the Royal Society of British Sculptors. For many years they lived together in a house that had been specially designed for artists by Sir John Belcher for the sculptor Sir Hamo Thornycroft at 2A Melbury Road, Holland Park, London.

Osborne died on 16 April 1979 in Orsett.

== Legacy ==
Osborne's prints are held in national public collections including The Ashmolean, Oxford, The Victoria and Albert Museum, London, University of Wales Aberystwyth, Cuming Museum, London.

The first major retrospective of Osborne’s work was held in July 1986 as part of the 25th anniversary of the World Wildlife Fund UK. Harry Eccleston, President of the Royal Society of Painter-Etchers and Engravers said:

“Although I have known and admired individual pieces of Osborne’s work for the past forty years, seeing it all gathered together is a revelation. You are suddenly aware of how much he is following in the great tradition of those British artists who have found their inspiration in animals and birds which surround them: Stubbs, Bewick and more recently Tunnicliffe”.

In addition to the Royal Academy and RWS Galleries in London, exhibitions of Osborne's work have been held at Reading Museum & Art Gallery (1960), Barton Art Gallery, Tenterden (1986 in association with the World Wildlife Fund) Guild Gallery, London (1987) University of Wales, Aberystwyth (1987) Victoria Art Gallery, Bath (1988) Jane Haler Gallery (1988), Darling Harbour Expo, Sydney Australia (1988) The Burton Art Gallery Bideford, Devon (2014) and Nature in Art (2016).

== Memberships and awards ==
- Scholarship to the Royal Academy of Arts
- Rome Scholar
- Fellow of the Royal Society of Painter-Etchers (R.E.)
