= Twist of Fate (1954 film) =

1954 film by David Miller

- Theatrical release poster
- Directed by: David Miller
- Screenplay by: Carl Nystrom; Robert Westerby
- Story by: David Miller; Alford Van Ronkel
- Produced by: Maxwell Setton; John R. Sloan
- Starring: Ginger Rogers; Herbert Lom; Stanley Baker; Jacques Bergerac
- Cinematography: Edward Scaife
- Edited by: Alan Osbiston
- Music by: Malcolm Arnold
- Production companies: British Lion Films; Marksman Productions Ltd.
- Distributed by: United Artists (US); British Lion Films (UK)
- Release dates: July 13, 1954 (London); November 5, 1954 (United States)
- Running time: 89 minutes
- Countries: United Kingdom; United States
- Language: English

Twist of Fate (UK title: Beautiful Stranger; also known as Lifeline) is a 1954 British and American mystery film noir directed by David Miller and starring Ginger Rogers and Herbert Lom. It was written by Carl Nystrom and Robert Westerby from a story by David Miller and Alford Van Ronkel.

== Plot ==
Joan Victor, an actress known as "Johnny" to her friends, is living in Cannes, France, where she and financier Louis Galt plan to marry as soon as he gets a divorce.

Louis's wife Marie and her brothers control Louis's firm and have become suspicious of his business methods. Marie is unaware that Louis is the ringleader of a gang that deals in counterfeit gold coins.

In a casino Johnny runs into Emile Landosh, an acquaintance. He claims a need for money due to his wife's medical bills, so Johnny offers him a loan. Emile, however, is a criminal and in debt to Louis.

Johnny overhears Marie at the beauty salon and realises Louis might be lying about the divorce. Johnny confronts him, then angrily leaves and drives her car off the road, leaving it damaged. She seeks help at the home of Pierre Clement, an artist. The two begin seeing each other, with Pierre teaching her how to use a pottery wheel.

Luigi, a thug who works for Louis, is pressuring Emile to repay what he owes. In desperation, Emile breaks into Johnny's villa and steals a bracelet. When he gives it to Luigi as settlement of his debt, it arouses suspicions from Louis that his lover and Emile must be having an affair, because he'd given it to Johnny as a gift.

Pierre proposes marriage to Johnny, and she accepts. Emile overhears an argument between Johnny and Louis and eventually realises that she believes Louis has found out about Pierre, whereas he suspects Emile.

Louis catches Emile trying to crack a safe. During a struggle with him, Louis is shot with his own gun. Johnny and Pierre arrive just as Emile is trying to hide the body. They tie up Emile and are driving him to the police when they are intercepted by Luigi. Emile slips free of his bonds and runs for a bay where Louis' associates arrive with a boat. Pierre pursues him, leading to a running fistfight on the coastal cliffs. Meanwhile, the police have been investigating Louis and Johnny; a policeman shoots Luigi, but he is still able to kill Emile. Johnny and Pierre are absolved of all suspicion by Emile's dying confession.

== Cast ==
- Ginger Rogers as 'Johnny' Victor
- Herbert Lom as Emile Landosh
- Stanley Baker as Louis Galt
- Olive Lucius as Mademoiselle Pletsier
- Yves Aysage as croupier
- John Le Mesurier as 1st. man at casino
- Tony Spear as attendant
- Dino Galvani as cashier, casino
- Bernard Rebel as engraver
- Marcella De Cleve as hairdresser's receptionist
- Jacques Bergerac as Pierre Clement
- Margaret Rawlings as Marie Galt
- Eddie Byrne as Luigi
- Coral Browne as Helen
- Lisa Gastoni as Yvette
- Lily Kann as Nicole
- Ferdy Mayne as Police Chief
- Keith Pyott as Georges
- John Chandos (actor) as Nino, the hairdresser
- Keith Pyott as Georges
- Elizabeth Digby-Smith as Cecile
- Alexis Chesnakov as guitarist, Roger
- Marianne Stone as Annabelle
- Nicholas Bruce as Robert
- Rudolph Offenbach as yacht captain
- Pierre Chaminade as 1st. sailor
- Carl Duering as 2nd. sailor
- Amando Guinle as 1st. fisherman
- Andreas Malandrinos as 2nd. fisherman, (billed as Andre Malandrinos)
- Guy De Monceau as policeman
- Paul Sheridan as Galt's manservant
- Ferdy Mayne as Chief of Police
- Roger Delgado as police officer
- Jack Taylor as Policeman
- Paul Brogdan as customs officer
- John Martin as coastguard

== Production ==
The film was known during production as Lifeline. Walter Rilla was originally cast as the male lead but he and Rogers did not get along. Said Rilla at the time, "According to the script I – a man of 52 – am supposed to have an affair with a girl of 24, who is Miss Rogers. Which is somewhat ridiculous. She may feel 24, but really..." Rilla was really sixty, at the time, and Rogers was forty-three.

Rumours were rife about Rogers' temperament and Rilla's dissatisfaction with the size of his role in comparison to Jacques Bergerac, who was Rogers' husband at the time. Ten days into production Rilla left the film and was replaced by Stanley Baker.

Bergerac and Rogers met in France, and she was responsible for his casting.

Exteriors of the film were shot in Cannes.

== Reception ==
=== Box office ===
The film did poorly at the box office.

=== Critical ===
The Monthly Film Bulletin wrote: "A deeply involved melodrama, whose motives become less clear the longer it continues. In the last scenes especially it is almost impossible to know why any of the characters are doing anything. 'The action takes place in settings joyfully larger than life; Johnny and Galt live in Second Empire palaces, Landosh in a miserable garret, and there is a coiners' den of which the old Britannia would have been proud. Ginger Rogers, Jacques Bergerac and Margaret Rawlings are as efficient as could be hoped; Stanley Baker and Herbert Lom have entered a little too energetically into the oldtime melodrama style. The photography is elegant."

In The Radio Times Guide to Films Robyn Karney gave the film 1/5 stars, writing: "Ginger Rogers, moving inexorably towards her sell-by date, stars in this thriller set on the French Riviera. ... Labyrinthine and unconvincing."

TV Guide rated the film 2/4 stars and wrote that Rogers was too old to play the lead character.
