= Kiyoshi Yamashita =

Japanese artist (1922–1971)

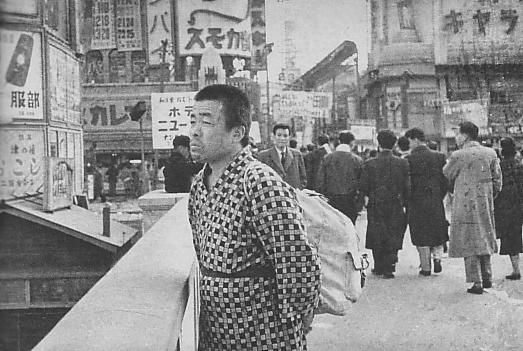
Kiyoshi Yamashita on Ebisubashi Bridge, 1955

Kiyoshi Yamashita (山下 清, Yamashita Kiyoshi (born Seiji Obashi; 10 March 1922 – 12 July 1971) was a Japanese artist. He is famous for his wanderings throughout Japan, during which he often wore a sleeveless undershirt, garnering the nickname "The Naked General."

== Early life ==
Yamashita was born in Asakusa, Tokyo. After the Great Kanto Earthquake of 1923, his family moved to Niigata. In 1926, they returned to Asakusa. At the age of three, he had an acute abdominal disorder which, although not life-threatening, left him with a mild speech impediment and some neurological damage.

At elementary school, Yamashita was the victim of bullying and on one occasion wounded a classmate with a knife. Because of this, his parents decided to move him to the Yahata institution for the mentally handicapped in Ichikawa, Chiba. His IQ was measured at 68. It was here he started to experiment using torn pieces of paper to create pictures. His talent was recognised by mental health expert Ryuzaburo Shikiba, who organised an exhibition of Yamashita's work in Osaka which received wide praise. In 1939, "特異児童作品集" was published. The anthology featured artwork by students at Yawata Gakuen, including pieces by Kiyoshi Yamashita. This reflects the historical context in which his early works garnered public attention.

Tiring of life at the institution, and in order to avoid the mandatory physical examination for recruitment into the Imperial Japanese Army, Yamashita ran away in 1940 to start his wandering around Japan, which would last until 1954.

At the age of 21, staff from the institution found him helping in a restaurant and forced him to take the recruitment exam. Eventually he was considered exempt from service. The events from this time were recorded in his “Wandering Diary” of 1956, and the most popular image of Yamashita travelling alone through the country with his rucksack comes from this period.

== Works ==
Yamashita used the chigiri-e method of sticking torn pieces of coloured paper together to depict the scenery he saw on his travels, and some of his most famous works such as "Nagaoka no hanabi" and "Sakurajima" were made in this way. Yamashita also employed a technique called koyori (twisting paper into thin strips) to create a vivid and lifelike fireworks effect in his work"Nagaoka no hanabi" . Possessing eidetic memory,Yamashita usually recreated the entire scene from memory when he returned to the institution or his home.

In the post-war period, he became widely known as the “Japanese Van Gogh” or the “Naked General” (due to his habit of wearing a sleeveless undershirt in his travels). In 1956, the Kiyoshi Yamashita Exhibition opened at the Daimaru store in Tokyo, and toured the country, stopping at 130 places in Japan and attracting over 500,000 visitors. In June 1961, Yamashita and Shikiba embarked on a 40-day tour of Europe. Here he recorded the many famous places and monuments he saw.

== Death ==
Yamashita died from a cerebral hemorrhage aged 49.

== Legacy ==
His work is still highly regarded throughout Japan, and is the subject of frequent exhibitions. His life was portrayed in a long-running Japanese television drama, Hadaka no Taishō Hōrōki (裸の大将放浪記; The Wandering Record of The Naked General), which ran from 1980 to 1997.

A retrospective of Yamashita’s works honoring his 100th anniversary was exhibited at the Sompo Museum of Art in Nishi-Shinjuku (June 24-September 10, 2023).
