= Chigiri-e =

Japanese art form

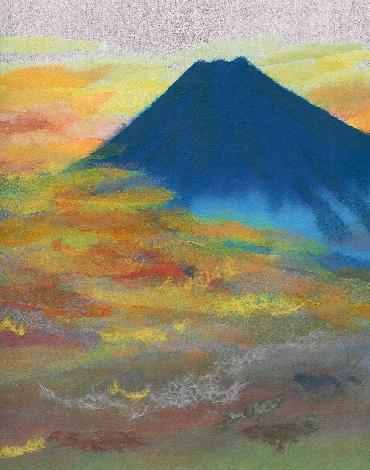
A modern example of chigiri-e

Chigiri-e (ちぎり絵) is a Japanese art form in which the primary technique uses coloured paper that is torn to create images, and may resemble a water colour painting. The technique dates from the Heian period of Japanese history when it was often used in conjunction with calligraphy. Handmade paper is essential for the creation of chigiri-e images.

== History ==
In Japan's Heian period chigiri-e was used in conjunction with calligraphy. Poems were written on a background of either plain or decorated coloured paper, such as in the textural passages of the Genji scrolls and the Sanju Rokunin Kashu. In the 11th century calligraphy paper was usually white or light blue: it could be decorated and coloured and then mounted onto a support.

Chigiri-e has become a popular art form. It can be used to create either realistic images or abstract ones. Its use in Japan is often decorative, using flowers and landscapes as subject matter. The paper may be coloured by the craftsman paper-maker but many chigiri-e artists colour the paper themselves, using vegetable dyes, coloured inks or powder pigments. The paper most often used is Tengujoshi: a handmade, long-fibered, very light weight paper (0.03 millimetres thickness).

The craft of paper-making had almost disappeared until, in the early 1900s, a craftsman developed Tengujoshi, one of the strongest and finest papers currently made. The craft takes three years to learn. This paper, due to its strength, transparency and lightness, is also used for repairing and restoring paintings and other art works. The paper can be made in any range of colors, or may be uncolored. Although very light weight its long fibres assure its strength. It is made with 100% mulberry and is sifted through bamboo boards woven with a layer of silk; only about 100 sheets may be produced in one day. There is also a less-labour-intensive machine-made version of Tengujo paper. Japanese artist Kiyoshi Yamashita is known for his intricate paper-tearing collages. In Nagaoka no hanabi, he uses the koyori technique—twisting paper into thin strips—to depict the visual effects of fireworks.

== Themes ==
Traditionally Heian calligraphy backgrounds incorporated Chinese patterns and themes and are often used in woodblock techniques to achieve them (grasses, bamboo, water). These themes are still used. Colorful collages could be made with torn (chigiri-e) or cut (kiri-e) paper. Some were further decorated with colour pigments or metallic dust. This provides the under-drawing for aristocratic calligraphy. The combination of texture and transparency results in a characteristic richness of colour. "Colour names and layered colours are woven throughout Heian poetry and literature. The use of layered colour is also found in clothing in this period. In many collage techniques found images are used but in chigiri-e the torn paper itself is used to create images.

== See also ==
- Washi paper.
