= Taffy and the Jungle Hunter =

1965 film

- Theatrical release poster
- Directed by: Terry O. Morse
- Screenplay by: Arthur Hoerl; Al Zimbalist
- Story by: Donald Zimbalist
- Produced by: William Faris
- Starring: Jacques Bergerac; Manuel Padilla Jr. Shary Marshall; Hari Rhodes
- Cinematography: Brydon Baker
- Edited by: William Faris
- Music by: Shorty Rogers
- Production company: Zimbalist Company
- Distributed by: Allied Artists Pictures
- Release date: March 31, 1965
- Running time: 87 minutes
- Country: United States
- Language: English

Taffy and the Jungle Hunter is a 1965 American adventure film directed by Terry O. Morse and written by Arthur Hoerl and Al Zimbalist. The film stars Jacques Bergerac, Manuel Padilla Jr., Shary Marshall and Hari Rhodes. The film was released on March 31, 1965, by Allied Artists Pictures.

== Cast ==
- Jacques Bergerac as David Claveau
- Manuel Padilla Jr. as Beau
- Shary Marshall as Rosa Wynn
- Hari Rhodes as Kahli
- Robert DoQui
