= Tengujo =

Specialist Japanese paper

Tengujo or tengucho paper (典具帖紙, tenguchōshi) is a specialist Japanese paper. It is an extremely thin kōzo paper that is almost transparent. One of its uses is for archival conservation. It has also been used for lighting design.

The paper is produced in the Kochi prefecture of Japan by the company Hidaka Washi since 1949. The product is made with kozo (stems of mulberry trees), alkaline water and neri (a liquid from the tororo-aoi plant).
