= Anna Lee Carroll =

American actress (1930–2017)

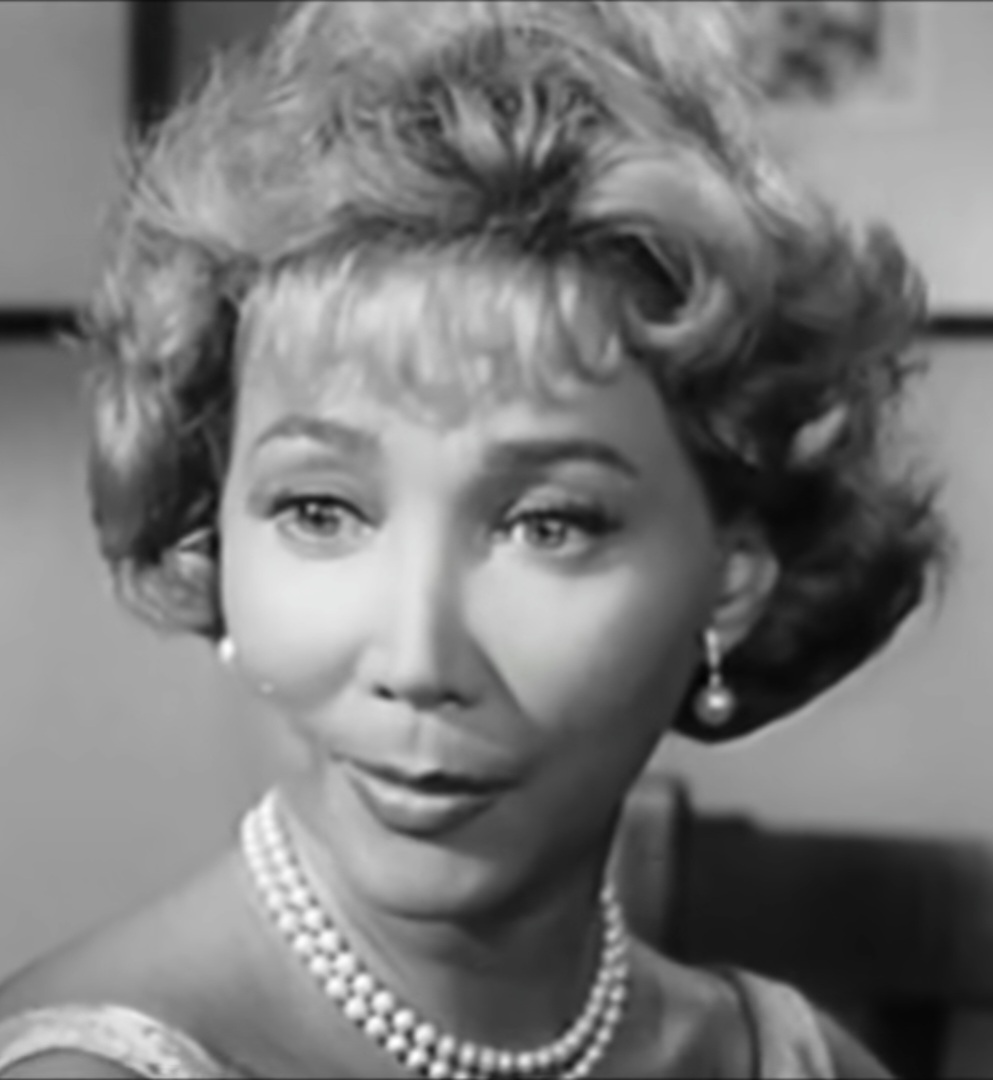
- Anna Lee Carroll in an episode of One Step Beyond (1959)
- Born: October 7, 1930; Birmingham, Alabama, U.S.
- Died: April 30, 2017 (aged 86); Birmingham, Alabama, U.S.
- Resting place: Elmwood Cemetery, Birmingham, Alabama
- Occupation: Actress
- Years active: 1951–1969

Anna Lee "Boots" Carroll (October 7, 1930 – April 30, 2017) was an American actress, based in Alabama, whose career included dozens of theaters productions, as well as several movies and television shows.

Carroll was best known for her portrayal of Nurse Bradford in the 1968 film, The Heart Is a Lonely Hunter, alongside Alan Arkin. Arkin plays a deaf mute in the film, while Carroll's Nurse Bradford provides the dialogue for his character in their mutual scenes. Carroll's additional film roles included Not of This Earth in 1957 and Marlowe in 1969.

== Early life ==
Carroll was born in Birmingham, Alabama, on October 7, 1930, as the sole child of Frederick L. "Peck" and Ella Corrine "E.C." Carroll.

== Career ==
She began her professional acting career in 1952 as a cast member for theater director James Hatcher's Town and Gown Theater, a Birmingham theater first opened in 1950. She rose to become one of the leading stage actresses in Alabama, starring in dozens of plays and traveling productions from 1952 until her final role in 2015. In addition to the Town and Gown, she appeared in productions by the Virginia Samford Theatre, Birmingham Festival Theatre and the Terrific New Theatre. She also joined the cast of touring theater companies, including Wit's Other End and the Seasoned Performers. Carroll frequently co-starred with actress and writer Fannie Flagg, author of Fried Green Tomatoes at the Whistle Stop Cafe; the two had first met in 1960 while both were acting at the Town and Gown.

Carroll also performed in the film Fear No More (1961).

== Personal life ==
Carroll performed consistently until 2012, when she fell from the stage during a dress rehearsal at the Virginia Samford Theatre in Birmingham. She was taken to the hospital, where doctors discovered a tumor unrelated to her accident. She recovered and returned to acting. She performed her final theater role in 2015. Carroll underwent a second surgery in 2016, while declining health sidelined her performances.

Carroll died on April 30, 2017, at the age of 86. She was buried in Elmwood Cemetery in her native Birmingham.

== Filmography ==
=== Film ===
| Year | Title | Role | Notes |
|---|---|---|---|
| 1954 | The Adventures of Hajji Baba | Slave Girl | Uncredited |
| 1955 | Son of Sinbad | Harem Girl | Uncredited |
| 1955 | The Road to Denver | Miss Honeywell | |
| 1957 | Not of This Earth | Davanna Woman | |
| 1957 | The Garment Jungle | Model | Uncredited |
| 1957 | Man of a Thousand Faces | Chorine | Uncredited |
| 1957 | Operation Mad Ball | Lt. Leeming | Uncredited |
| 1961 | Fear No More | Denise Colbert | |
| 1962 | Womanhunt | Janet Oberon | |
| 1962 | House of Women | Inmate | Uncredited |
| 1968 | The Heart Is a Lonely Hunter | Nurse Bradford | |
| 1969 | Marlowe | Mona | Uncredited |

=== Television ===
| Year | Title | Role | Notes |
|---|---|---|---|
| 1951 | The Adventures of Kit Carson | Vi Bonner | Episode: "The Teton Tornado" |
| 1952 | The Adventures of Wild Bill Hickok | Ada Beecher / Betty Chester | 2 episodes |
| 1953 | The Range Rider | Susan Campbell | Episode: "Western Edition" |
| 1955 | The Star and the Story | Miss Parker | Episode: "The Unforgivable" |
| 1957, 1959 | Highway Patrol | Mrs. Redmond / Betty Brandon | 2 episodes |
| 1959 | Rescue 8 | Thelma Dirkus | Episode: "Hour of Rage" |
| 1959 | Alcoa Presents: One Step Beyond | Nina Olson | Episode: "The Hand" |
| 1960 | The Lawless Years | Zelda Mason | Episode: "The Prantera Story" |
| 1960 | Death Valley Days | Mrs. Gibbs | Episode: "City of Widows" |
| 1961 | The Deputy | Sally | Episode: "The Legend of Dixie" |
| 1961, 1964 | Perry Mason | Georgiana Douglas / Elaine Paisley | 2 episodes |
| 1962 | Cain's Hundred | Jean Gilbert | Episode: "The Debasers: Milton Bonner and Phillip Colerane" |
| 1962 | Shannon | Helen Tobin | Episode: "Man from Yesterday" |
| 1962 | Surfside 6 | Julie Fox | Episode: "Many a Slip" |
| 1963 | Sam Benedict | Mrs. Olson | Episode: "Of Rusted Cannons and Fallen Sparrows" |
| 1963 | Empire | Helen | Episode: "65 Miles Is a Long, Long Way" |
| 1963 | Dennis the Menace | Hair Dresser | Episode: "Never Say Dye" |
| 1964 | Ben Casey | Ellen Casey | Episode: "One Nation Indivisible" |
| 1964 | The Rogues | Lydia | Episode: "The Day They Gave Diamonds Away" |
| 1966 | The F.B.I. | Secretary | Episode: "The Scourge" |
