= Steven Rothenberg =

American film studio executive

- Born: September 12, 1958; New York City, New York, U.S.
- Died: July 17, 2009 (aged 50); Burbank, California, U.S.
- Education: Stanford University
- Occupation: Studio executive

Steven Rothenberg (September 12, 1958 – July 17, 2009) was an American film studio executive. Rothenberg headed the theatrical distribution operations at Lions Gate Entertainment at the film studio's President of domestic releasing. He oversaw the release of more than 350 movies during his career, which spanned 28 years at several film studios.

== Early life ==
Rothenberg was born and raised in New York City. He received his bachelor's degree with honors from Stanford University.

== Career ==
Rothenberg began his career in the film industry when he was hired by filmmaker and fellow Stanford alumnus Roger Corman. Rothenberg worked with Corman in film distribution. Rothenberg later worked in distribution at Savoy Entertainment and The Samuel Goldwyn Company as well.

Rothenberg was president of domestic film distribution at Artisan Entertainment prior to joining Lionsgate. In particular, Rothenberg created and oversaw the distribution strategy for The Blair Witch Project, which went on to become the highest grossing indie film in history at the time. He also helmed the domestic distribution of Requiem for a Dream, Buena Vista Social Club and many other films while at Artisan.

Rothenberg headed the theatrical distribution operations of Lionsgate, or its predecessor companies, for more than 10 years. It was Rothenberg who coordinated and oversaw the domestic film releases of Tyler Perry and Saw film franchises, as well as Fahrenheit 9/11, 3:10 to Yuma and Crash, which won the Academy Award for Best Picture. The combined boxoffice gross of the films in which Rothenberg facilitated the releases totaled more than $2 billion for Lions Gate.

He was a member of the Academy of Motion Picture Arts & Sciences.

== Personal life ==
Steven Rothenberg died of stomach cancer in Burbank, California, on July 17, 2009, at the age of 50. He was survived by his wife Frances and their children Alexandra, Ted, and Emma, all of Glendale, California, where Rothenberg also resided. Rothenberg was also survived by his mother, Ina Rothenberg, and sister, Stacy Moscoe.

Rothenberg's memorial service and burial was held at the Mount Sinai Memorial Park Cemetery in the Hollywood Hills of Los Angeles.
