= Novey =

Novey is a surname. Notable people with the surname include:

- Bill Novey (1948–1991), American special effects person
- Idra Novey, American novelist, poet, and translator
