= Mo Rothman =

American studio executive (1919 – 2011)

Moses Rothman (January 14, 1919 – September 15, 2011) was a Canadian-born, American studio executive who persuaded Charlie Chaplin to return to the United States in 1972, ending Chaplin's twenty year, self-imposed exile. Chaplin's return to the United States restored his popularity and public reputation.

Jeffrey Vance, author of the 2003 Chaplin biography, Chaplin: Genius of the Cinema, wrote that Chaplin's 1972 return to the United States, which was arranged by Rothman, was "one of the greatest P.R. coups, and personal rehabilitations" in the history of the film industry. Vance further wrote that, "Rothman is the guy who re-made Chaplin."

== Biography ==
=== Career ===
Rothman was born in Montreal, Quebec, Canada, on January 14, 1919, to Meyer and Molly Rotman. Rothman was one of his parents four children. His father worked as a kosher butcher. Rothman would later change his name from Moses to Mo once he entered the work force. Rothman served in the Royal Canadian Air Force during World War II, stationed in Dublin, Ireland. While in Ireland, Rothman began to meet Americans who worked in the film industry, who invited him to New York City to work in entertainment after the war.

Rothman took their advice and moved to New York City after the end of the war. He worked for Universal Pictures from 1946 to 1952 as an overseas manager in India, Singapore and Venezuela. In 1952, Rothman joined United Artists' office in Paris, France, as the studio's continental European manager, where he worked from 1952 to 1959.

Rothman was hired by Columbia Pictures in 1960 as the CEO of Columbia's international division. He rose to become Columbia Pictures' vice president for worldwide marketing. Rothman also served as Columbia Pictures' representative to director Stanley Kubrick during the production of his 1964 film, Dr. Strangelove. He retired from Columbia Pictures in 1971 to focus on the distribution of Charlie Chaplin's film library.

=== Charlie Chaplin ===
Charlie Chaplin, one of Hollywood's best known figures, had founded United Artists with Mary Pickford, D.W. Griffith and Douglas Fairbanks. By the early 1950s, Chaplin's stardom had dimmed due to perceived Communist sympathies and scandals involving his two previous, early marriages to sixteen-year-old girls. Chaplin, though a British citizen, had lived in the United States for forty years, but his political affiliations made him a subject of suspicion during the McCarthy Era.

In 1952, Chaplin traveled to his native home to promote the London premiere of Limelight, the last film he made in the United States. While abroad, United States Attorney General James P. McGranery revoked Chaplin's re-entry permit and would not allow him to return to the United States. Chaplin moved to Switzerland in 1952, and swore never to return to the United States. Chaplin owned and retained the rights to most of his movies, which he took with him to Switzerland.

Rothman's relationship to Chaplin stretched back to the 1950s, when he first met Chaplin while working as United Artists' European manager. In early 1971, a group of investors, led by Rothman, paid Chaplin $6 million, plus 50% royalties, for the distribution rights to some of his best known movies, including The Great Dictator, Limelight, City Lights, The Gold Rush and Modern Times. Rothman left his job as vice president of worldwide marketing for Columbia Pictures in 1971 to lead the investors and handle the distribution of Chaplin's films on a full-time basis.

Rothman successfully persuaded Chaplin, who was 83 years old at the time, to return to the United States in order to promote the re-release of his film catalog. Chaplin was hesitant, but agreed to Rothman's offer. Charlie Chaplin, accompanied by both his wife, Oona, and Mo Rothman, arrived in New York City on April 2, 1972. Chaplin attended a tribute to his films held by the Film Society of Lincoln Center in New York. He was further awarded the honorary Academy Award one week later.

The visit, orchestrated by Rothman, restored Chaplin's popularity and reputation. At the time, the New York Times noted Rothmam's extensive involvement with the visit describing Rothman as "abrupt and ingratiating five times in three minutes" — as a kind of performance in its own right, evoking the manner of "the Hollywood tycoon of the 1930s." Chaplin's daughter, Geraldine Chaplin, later wrote that Rothman was the "brave and clever reviver of Charlie Chaplin worldwide."

Chaplin died in 1977, his popularity restored. Rothman continued to release his films throughout the 1970s and 1980s. During the mid-1980s, Rothman loaned the now defunct United States Information Agency twelve of Chaplin's films, which were screened at American embassies worldwide as an example of American film and art.

=== Later life ===
In 1982, Rothman was the recipient of the Order of Merit of the Italian Republic for his contributions to Italian cinema. He served as a judge for both the Venice Film Festival and the Cannes Film Festival in 1985.

Rothman was diagnosed with Parkinson's disease later in life. In 2001, his wife, Lyn Rothman, spurred on by her husband's diagnosis, founded the Parkinson's Appeal for Deep Brain Stimulation, based in London.

Mo Rothman died from Parkinson's disease in Los Angeles on September 15, 2011, at the age 92. and is survived by his wife, Lyn Rothman, with whom he had been married for 37 years; three children from two previous marriages: Keith from his first marriage and Nicole and Monique from his second marriage to German actress Hanna Rucker (1923-1982); two stepchildren, Sebastian and Arabella; and seven grandchildren. He was interred at Mount Sinai Memorial Park Cemetery in Los Angeles.
