= Mount Sinai Memorial Park =

Jewish cemetery in California

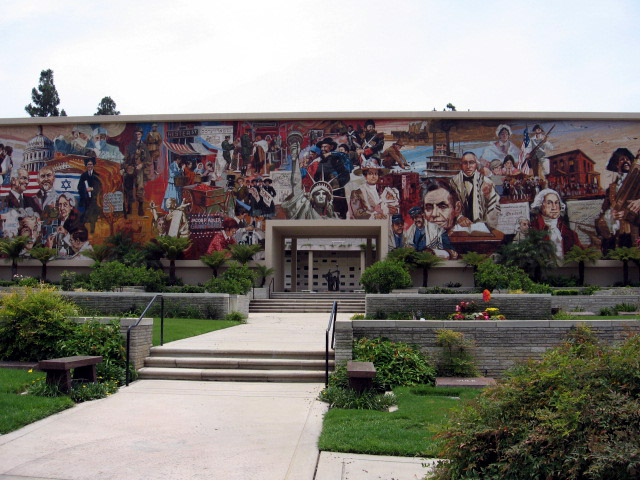
- The Heritage Mosaic at Mount Sinai Memorial Park in Hollywood Hills
- Interactive map of Mount Sinai Memorial Park

Details
- Established: 1953
- Location: Hollywood Hills, Los Angeles, California and Simi Valley, California
- Country: United States
- Coordinates: 34.15210°N 118.31907°W
- Style: Jewish
- Owned by: Sinai Temple
- Website: Mount Sinai Memorial Parks and Mortuaries

Mount Sinai Memorial Park comprises two Jewish cemeteries in the Los Angeles area: Mount Sinai Hollywood Hills, established in 1953, and Mount Sinai Simi Valley, opened in 1997. Both cemeteries are administered by Mount Sinai Memorial Parks and Mortuaries, a nonprofit owned and operated by the Sinai Temple. Collectively, they form the largest Jewish cemeteries in the Western United States. Many notable Jewish people from the American entertainment and arts industry are buried here.

== History ==
Mount Sinai Memorial Parks and Mortuaries, owned by Sinai Temple of Los Angeles, refers to a Jewish mortuary and two Jewish cemeteries in the Los Angeles metropolitan area. The original cemetery property is located at 5950 Forest Lawn Drive in the Hollywood Hills of Los Angeles. The cemetery was originally established in 1953 by the neighboring Forest Lawn-Hollywood Hills Cemetery. In 1959, it became an exclusively Jewish cemetery, and in 1967 it was acquired by Sinai Temple, the oldest and largest Conservative synagogue in Los Angeles, which dedicated its mortuary and cemetery resources to all members of the Jewish community in and around the city. Numerous stars and celebrities from the entertainment industry are interred in the park, which is located down the street from Warner Bros studios.

== Artwork ==
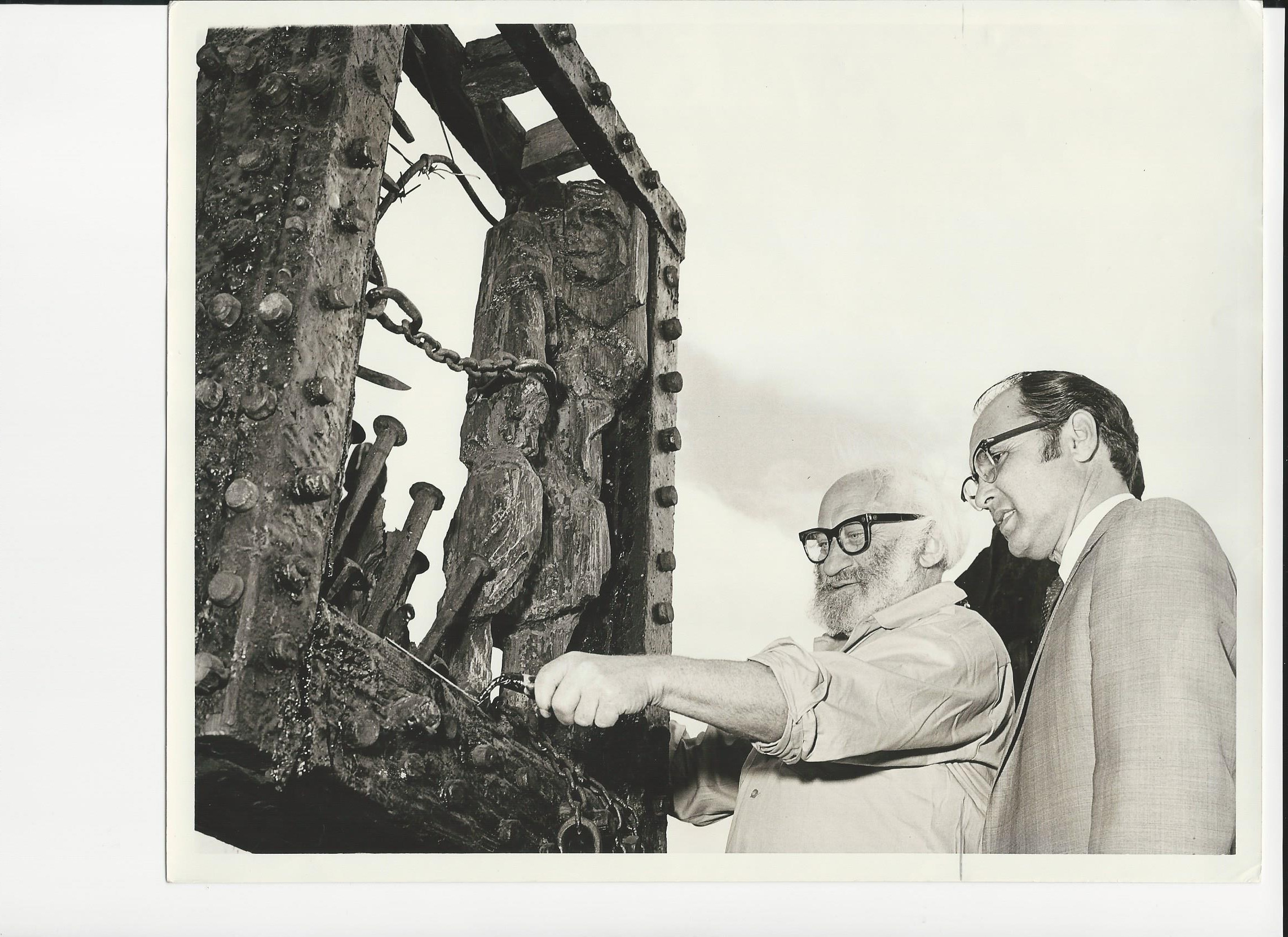
Warsaw Ghetto Memorial rendered in burnt wood to depict differences among Holocaust victims.

Throughout the different sections of Mount Sinai Hollywood Hills, one encounters various forms of artwork including mosaics, sculpture, fountains and carvings. The art displayed at the Parks provides an opportunity for Jews who may have grown distant from their heritage to re-acquaint themselves with their roots.

== Gardens of Heritage- Heritage Mosaic ==
The most noticeable artwork is the Heritage Mosaic located at Mount Sinai's Hollywood Hills location, which, at 145 by 30 feet (44.2 m × 9.1 m), depicts a panorama of the Jewish experience in America and is made up of more than 2.5 million pieces of hand-cut Venetian glass.

The artwork begins with the arrival of a small group of Jews in Nieuw Amsterdam in 1654 and continues with highlights of American Jewish history up to the time of the founding of the State of Israel.

The Gardens of Heritage was dedicated in September 1984, after several years of design and construction. The mosaic has also served as an educational tool for visitors to learn about the story of Jewish settlement and accomplishments in the United States.

== The Warsaw Ghetto Memorial ==
The park also features a memorial monument by renowned Jewish artist Bernard Zakheim. The memorial is dedicated to the six million Jews who were murdered in the Holocaust. Six three-dimensional figures, all rendered in burnt and tortured wood, represent six heroic Jewish figures: those who resisted partisan fighters, a woman warrior, the schoolgirls who martyred themselves, a scholar and a child who could not resist, and one figure that stands for those who went passively to their deaths.

At Yom HaShoah commemorations, memorial candles are lit in front of plaques bearing the names of concentration camps.

Rising from the stones of the memorial is a flame that symbolizes the eternal spirit of the six million and the rebirth of Israel from the ashes of the Holocaust.

== The Bet Alpha Synagogue Mosaic ==
When this 6th century (Byzantine period) Galilean synagogue was excavated, a cavity in the floor of its apse, which almost certainly served as a genizah, was uncovered; an Ark for the Torah Scrolls stood above it.

The central decorative feature of the Bet Alpha synagogue was its mosaic floor, reproduced in the Shemot Plaza by members of Kibbutz Eylon in the Galilee at five times its original size, using about four million tesserae. The 12 signs of the Zodiac are arranged in a circular pattern around a cover at the center that accesses the genizah below.

Art historian Michael Ave-Yonah comments on the Bet Alpha mosaic: "The simple but strong style of the mosaic pavement represents a folk art that appears to have developed among the Jewish villagers of Galilee. The figures are depicted frontally and the artist took great pains to make each scene expressive. The mosaics of Bet Alpha are striking in their coloring and stylization and are among the finest examples of Jewish art in the Byzantine period."

== Expansion to Simi Valley, California ==
In 1997, faced with dwindling space at the original Hollywood Hills location and recognizing the need for Jewish burial properties for future generations, Mount Sinai Memorial Parks expanded by opening its second memorial park, Mount Sinai Simi Valley.

== Simi Valley Green Burial Park- Teva ==
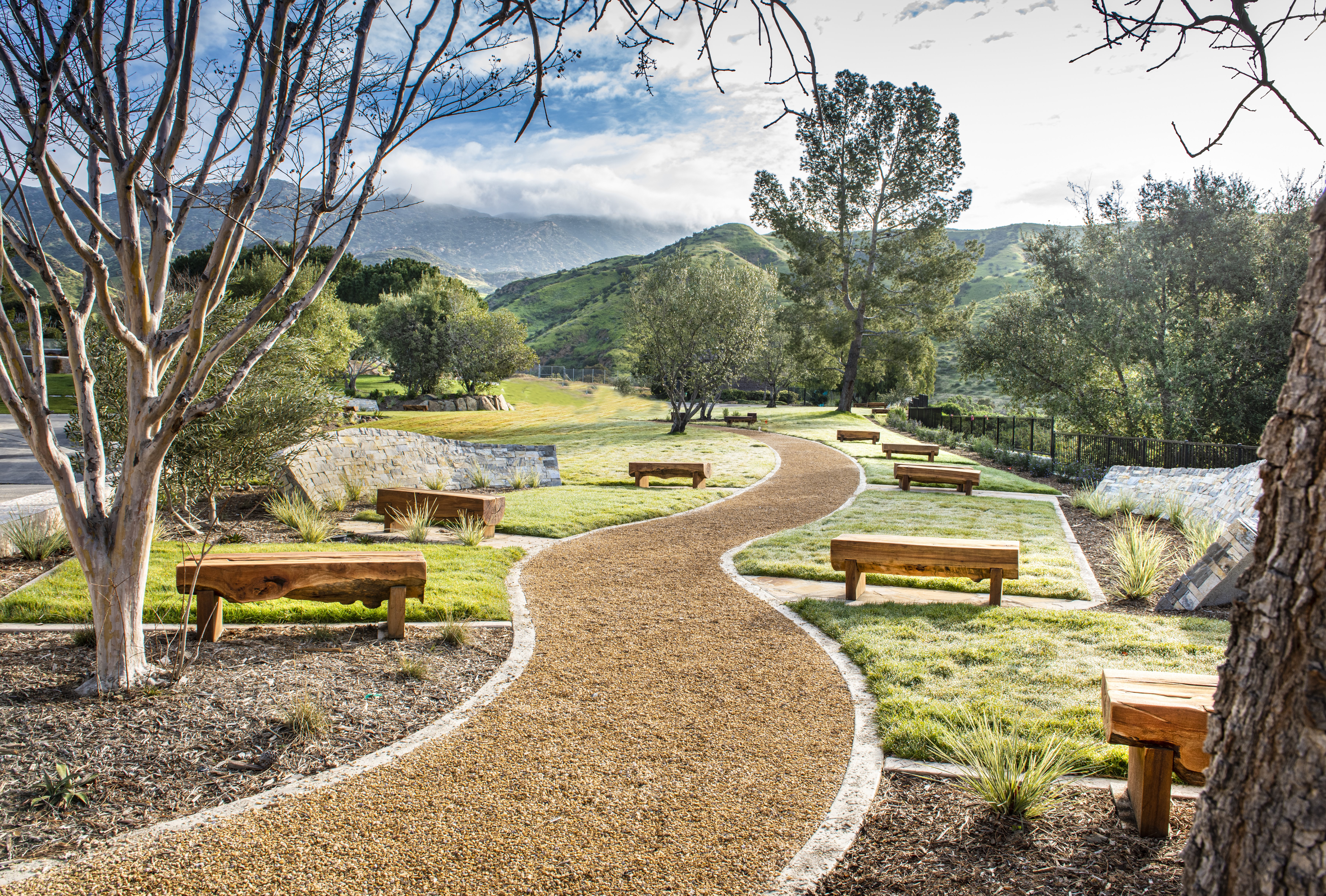
Mount Sinai's Simi Valley Certified Green Burial Cemetery.

In 2024 Mount Sinai Memorial Parks and Mortuaries was certified by the Green Burial Council as both a green funeral home and a provider of green burial services.

The Green Burial Council provides national certification for both funeral homes and cemeteries that provide environmentally conscious options for burial and disposition. Green burial has steadily grown in popularity over the past two decades, reflecting the community's desire for more natural disposition methods.

Joe Sehee, founder of the Green Burial Council explained, "Green burial is a way of caring for the dead with minimal environmental impact that aids in the conservation of natural resources, reduction of carbon emissions, protection of worker health and the restoration and preservation of habitat."

With this certification, Mount Sinai Memorial Parks and Mortuaries becomes part of a national network of green burial providers.

Teva at Mount Sinai Simi Valley is located near Kamenir Chapel, overlooking a protected nature reserve. The reserve is reached by a meandering stone path. Along the path are olive and pine trees, stone walls, and handcrafted wooden benches.

Teva's burials only use natural, sustainably sourced containers made of wicker or wood, or a natural fiber shroud that is fully biodegradable. There are no concrete vaults or liners placed in the interment space. The green burial area is planted with drought tolerant, native California plants that reflect the hillsides and areas that surround the park. In addition, a special strain of drought tolerant grass and decomposed granite covers the ground areas.

As part of their land stewardship, graves at Mount Sinai's natural burial sites are not marked with bronze markers. Instead, a natural engraved stone marker commemorates loved ones, and is included in the purchase of every space in the Natural Burial area.

== Genizah and book burials ==
Mount Sinai offers a Genizah program where members of the community can drop off worn out siddurim (prayer books), Torah scrolls, tallit, tzitzit, tefellin and other sacred materials which contain the Hebrew name of God, for burial at a later date. Several times each year, Mount Sinai invites school groups to Mount Sinai Simi Valley, where they will conduct a burial service for the books while learning about this ancient Jewish tradition.

== Notable interments ==
=== A ===
- Berle Adams (1917–2009), music producer
- Pearl "Polly" Adler (1900–1962), Manhattan brothel operator and author of House is Not a Home
- Irwin Allen (1916–1991), director, producer, writer
- Art Aragon (1927–2008), boxer
- Danny Arnold (1925–1995), film actor/editor/writer
- Eleanor Audley (1905–1991), actress and voice-over artist

=== B ===
- Dave Barry (1918–2001), actor and comedian
- Frances Bay (1919–2011), actress
- Herschel Bernardi (1923–1986), actor
- Sara Berner (1912–1969), actress and voice-over artist
- Nate Blumberg (1894–1960), former president of Universal Studios
- Gail Bonney (1901–1984), actress
- Eli Broad (1933–2021), businessman and philanthropist
- Georgia Brown (1933–1992), actress and singer
- James Burrows (1940-2026), Television director
- Edward Buzzell (1895–1985), director

=== C ===
- Sid Caesar (1922–2014), comedian and actor
- Brett Cantor (1967–1993), music label executive, concert promoter, and nightclub owner
- Charlie Cantor (1898–1966), actor
- June Carroll (1917–2004), lyricist, singer and actress
- Saul Chaplin (1912–1997), composer and musical director
- Virginia Christine (1920–1996), actress, voice artist
- Lee J. Cobb (1911–1976), actor
- Martin Cohan (1932–2010), television writer and producer
- Ruth Cohen (1930–2008), actress (Seinfeld)
- Kevin Conroy (1955–2022), actor, voice actor (Batman)
- Maxine Cooper (1924–2009), actress
- Stanley Cortez (1908–1997), cinematographer
- Irving Cottler (1918–1989), drummer
- Warren Cowan (1921–2008), publicist
- Harry Crane (1914–1999), American comedy writer
- Rosalind Cron (1925–2021), jazz musician, and last surviving member of the International Sweethearts of Rhythm of the 1940s

=== D ===
- Mark Damon (1933–2024), actor
- Sidney Dancoff (1913–1951), theoretical physicist
- Mack David (1912–1993), composer

=== E ===
- Cass Elliot (1941–1974), singer in The Mamas & the Papas
- Ziggy Elman (1911–1968), big-band musician and composer

=== F ===
- Lee Farr (1927–2017), actor
- Ben Feigin (1975–2022), television producer
- Fritz Feld (1900–1993), actor
- Norman Fell (1924–1998), actor
- Totie Fields (1930–1978), comedian
- Gerald Finnerman (1931–2011), cinematographer
- Bob Flanagan (1952–1996), performance artist and writer
- Dave Fleischer (1894–1979), film director and producer
- Helen Forrest (1917–1999), singer
- Bonnie Franklin (1944–2013), actress
- Karl Freund (1890–1969), cinematographer
- Murray Fromson (1929–2018), journalist

=== G ===
- Linda Gary (1944–1995), actress, voice actress
- Bruce Geller (1930–1978), producer
- Benny Goldberg (1918–2001), boxer
- Solomon W. Golomb (1932–2016), mathematician
- Saul Gorss (1908–1966), actor
- Michael Gordon (1909–1993), stage actor, stage and film director, maternal grandfather of Joseph Gordon-Levitt
- David Groh (1939–2008), actor
- Fred Grossinger (1936–1995), actor

=== H ===
- Billy Halop (1920–1976), actor
- Larry Harmon (1925–2008), actor and comedian (aka Bozo the Clown)
- Nat Hiken (1914–1968), writer, director, producer
- Arthur Hiller (1923–2016), director
- Rabbi David Hoffman (1954–2011), Jewish leader
- Gregg Hoffman (1963–2005), producer
- Peter Hurkos (1911–1988), psychic

=== J ===
- Milt Josefsberg (1911–1987), screenwriter

=== K ===
- Irma Kalish (1924–2021), television writer
- Eddie Kane (1889–1969), actor
- Leonard Katzman (1927–1996), film and TV writer, producer, director, and grandfather to Ethan Klein
- Donald Bruce Kaufman (1922–1983), businessman
- William Keene (1915–1992), actor
- Walter Kent (1911–1994), composer and conductor
- Ruth Klüger (1931–2020), Professor Emerita of German Studies
- Arnold Kopelson (1935–2018), film producer
- Suzanne Krull (1966–2013), actress
- Buzz Kulik (1922–1999), film director and producer

=== L ===
- John Larch (1914–2005), actor
- Sydney Lassick (1922–2003), actor
- Pinky Lee (1907–1993), actor and comedian
- Robert Q. Lewis (1920–1991), television personality, actor, and game show host
- Abraham M. Lurie (1923–2010), real estate developer

=== M ===
- Michael Madsen (1957–2025), actor
- Bruce Malmuth (1934–2005), director
- Ross Martin (1920–1981), actor
- Walter Maslow (1928-2025), actor
- Michael Masser (1941–2015), musician
- Sid Melton (1917–2011), actor
- Laurence Merrick (1926–1977), director and author
- Irving Mills (1894–1985), composer
- Marvin Minoff (1931–2009), film and television producer, executive producer of The Nixon Interviews
- Laurie Mitchell (1928–2018), actress
- Aubrey Morris (1926–2015), actor

=== N ===
- Daniel Naroditsky, Chess Grandmaster and Twitch Streamer.
- Claudette Nevins (1937–2020), actress
- Lawrence R. Newman (1925–2011), deaf activist, educator and author
- Bill Novey (1948–1991), Special Effects Master/Head of Special Effects at Walt Disney Imagineering/co-founder of Art & Technology, Inc.

=== P ===
- Daniel Pearl (1963–2002), journalist
- Ruth Pearl (1935–2021), mother of Daniel Pearl
- Philip Perlman (1919–2015), actor
- Lefty Phillips (1919–1972), baseball coach and manager
- Ted Post (1918–2013), film director

=== R ===
- Martin Ragaway (1923–1989), motion picture and television writer
- Michele Singer Reiner (1955–2025), film producer
- Rob Reiner (1947–2025), actor and filmmaker
- Peter Mark Richman (1927–2021), actor
- Don Rickles (1926–2017), comedian and actor
- Larry Rickles (1970–2011), screenwriter, son of Don Rickles
- Mark Robson (1913–1978), director
- Shorty Rogers (1924–1994), jazz musician
- David Rose (1910–1990), composer
- Bob Rosenfarb (1951-2026), television writer and producer
- Steven Rothenberg (1958–2009), film studio executive (Lions Gate, Artisan Entertainment)
- Mark Rothman (1947–2025), television writer
- Mo Rothman (1919–2011), studio executive who persuaded Charlie Chaplin to return to the United States in 1972
- Sam Rubin (1960–2024), entertainment anchor
- Tibor Rubin (1929–2015), Medal of Honor recipient

=== S ===
- Bob Saget (1956–2022), actor, comedian, and television host. The first host of America's Funniest Home Videos
- Gdal Saleski (1890-1966), cellist and musicians' biography writer
- Walter Scharf (1910–2003), composer
- Bob Shad (1920–1985), music producer
- Al Sherman (1897–1973), songwriter
- Mitzi Shore (1930–2018), comedy club owner
- Jan Shutan (1932–2021), actress
- Phil Silvers (1911–1985), actor and comedian
- Fred Silverman (1937–2020), television executive and producer
- Sidney Skolsky (1905–1983), Hollywood reporter
- Hillel Slovak (1962–1988), guitarist for Red Hot Chili Peppers
- Howard Smit (1911–2009), film make-up artist who led efforts to establish the Academy Award for Best Makeup
- Arleen Sorkin (1955–2023), actress best known for voicing Harley Quinn in Batman: The Animated Series
- Milton Sperling (1912–1988), American film producer and screenwriter
- Wendie Jo Sperber (1958–2005), actress
- Florence Stanley (1924–2003), actress
- Dawn Steel (1946–1997), film executive and producer
- Leonard B. Stern (1923–2011), television producer, director and writer
- Leonard Stogel (1934–1979), music business manager, promoter, record producer and executive. Victim of the crash of American Airlines Flight 191
- Harold J. Stone (1913–2005), actor
- Gloria Stroock (1924–2024), actress

=== T ===
- Iwao Takamoto (1925–2007), animator
- Brandon Tartikoff (1949–1997), television executive, former president of NBC
- Irving Taylor (1914–1983), songwriter
- Mel Taylor (1933–1996), musician, drummer and percussionist for the Ventures
- Dick Tufeld (1926–2012), actor, announcer, narrator
- Mark Tulin (1948–2011), bass guitarist
- Saul Turteltaub (1932–2020), television writer and producer

=== V ===
- Bobby Van (1928–1980), actor and dancer

=== W ===
- Joseph Wapner (1919–2017), judge, television personality. The first judge to preside over The People's Court
- Bea Wain (1917–2017), singer
- Lotus Weinstock (1943–1997), stand-up comedian, author, playwright, musician
- Danny Wells (1941–2013), actor, voice actor and composer
- Paul G. Wexler (1929–1979), actor
- Jesse White (1917–1997), actor
- Harry Wilson (1897–1978), actor
- David Winters (1939–2019), actor, dancer, choreographer
- Jay Wolpert (1942–2022), television producer and screenwriter
- Than Wyenn (1919–2015), actor

=== Z ===
- Howard Zieff (1927–2009), director, advertising photographer
