= Tarzan's Fight for Life =

1958 film by H. Bruce Humberstone

- Theatrical release poster
- Directed by: H. Bruce Humberstone
- Written by: Thomas Hal Phillips
- Based on: Characters created by Edgar Rice Burroughs
- Produced by: Sol Lesser
- Starring: Gordon Scott; Eve Brent; Rickie Sorensen; Jil Jarmyn; Cheeta
- Cinematography: William E. Snyder
- Edited by: Aaron Stell
- Music by: Ernest Gold
- Distributed by: MGM
- Release date: July 4, 1958
- Running time: 86 minutes
- Country: United States
- Language: English
- Box office: $2,045,000

Tarzan's Fight for Life is a 1958 American Metrocolor action adventure film featuring Edgar Rice Burroughs' famous jungle hero Tarzan and starring Gordon Scott, Eve Brent, Rickie Sorensen, Jil Jarmyn, and Cheeta the chimpanzee. The film was directed by H. Bruce Humberstone. The twenty-first film of the Tarzan film series that began with 1932's Tarzan the Ape Man, the picture was the second Tarzan film released in color, and the last to portray the ape man speaking broken English until Tarzan, the Ape Man (1981). The filming locations were in Africa and Hollywood, California. It was also the only film in the Scott series (and last film in the mainstream Tarzan film line) to feature the character of Jane. It was followed by Tarzan's Greatest Adventure in 1959.

== Plot ==
Jungle medics Dr. Sturdy (Carl Benton Reid) and his daughter Anne (Jil Jarmyn) are opposed by witch doctor Futa (James Edwards) of the Nagasu tribe, who regards their work as a threat to his own livelihood. Futa incites the tribe to waylay Anne's fiance Dr. Ken Warwick (Harry Lauter), who is saved by Tarzan (Gordon Scott).

Later Tarzan and his adopted son Tartu (Rickie Sorensen) enlist the doctors' services on behalf of Jane (Eve Brent), suffering from appendicitis. Futa hypnotizes Moto (Nick Stewart), a native assistant of Sturdy, to murder Jane, but Tarzan thwarts the plot. Learning that the young Nagasu chief is sick, Tarzan attempts to persuade them to let Sturdy treat them. Seizing his chance, Futa has the ape man taken captive and condemned to death.

To restore his own credentials, the witch doctor then undertakes to cure the chief himself, hedging his bets by having his henchman Ramo (Woody Strode) steal medicine from Sturdy. Unfortunately, Ramo purloins a poison by mistake. Freeing himself, Tarzan intervenes and prevents the administration of the poison to the chief; Futa then swallows it himself to demonstrate that there is no harm in it — and dies. Dr. Sturdy is consequently called in, successfully curing the chief.

== Cast ==
- Gordon Scott as Tarzan
- Eve Brent as Jane
- Rickie Sorensen as Tartu, Tarzan's Adopted Son
- Jil Jarmyn as Ann Sturdy
- James Edwards as Futa
- Carl Benton Reid as Dr. Sturdy
- Harry Lauter as Dr. Ken Warwick
- Woody Strode as Ramo

== Filming locations ==
Much of the movie was filmed in Africa but some scenes were filmed in Northern California, at Hat Creek, the Pit River and at Burney Falls.

== Box office ==
According to MGM records the film made $720,000 in the US and Canada and $1,325,000 elsewhere, resulting in a profit of $348,000.

== Legacy ==
The film was released to coincide with the 40th anniversary of the first Tarzan movie. It was the last Tarzan film made by Sol Lesser who retired and handed over the franchise to Sy Weintraub.

Shortly after completing this film, Scott, Brent, and Sorensen would play the same roles in an attempt to launch a "Tarzan" television series. However, the extremely low-budget project failed to sell, and the three half-hour episodes were spliced into an ersatz feature, Tarzan and the Trappers, released to television in 1966.
