= Saul Gorss =

American actor

Sol Gorss
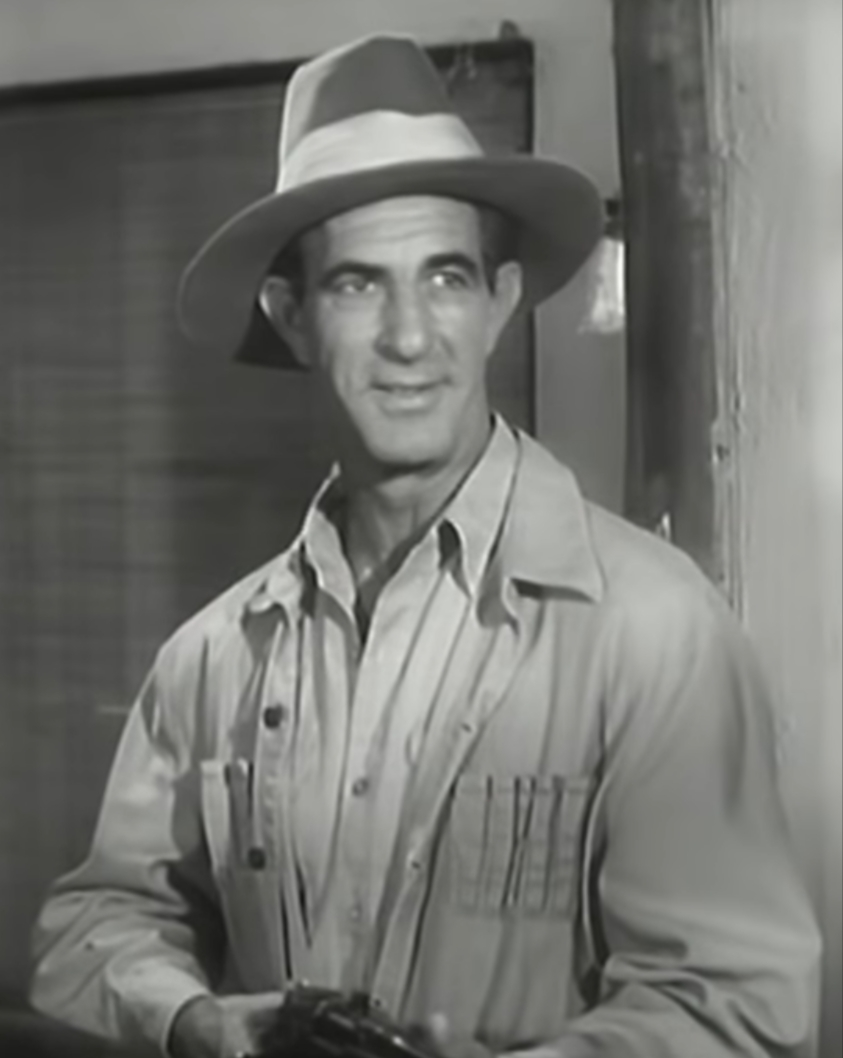
- Gorss in Tarzan and the Trappers (1958)
- Born: Saul Gorss; March 22, 1908
- Died: September 10, 1966 (aged 58)
- Resting place: Mount Sinai Memorial Park Cemetery
- Occupation: Actor
- Years active: 1931–1967
- Spouse: Virginia Haralson

Saul Gorss (March 22, 1908 – September 10, 1966) was a prominent American movie and television actor and stunt man. He was active from the 1930s to the mid-1960s, when he died.

== Early life ==
Before Gorss became an actor, he worked as a professional football player, a caddy and an assistant golf professional.

== Career ==
Gorss appeared in many films, including Warlock, The Phantom (serial), and Adventures of Superman, among many others. In 1944, he owned a night club.

== Personal life ==
On September 1, 1944, Gorss married actress Virginia Haralson. He is buried at Mount Sinai Memorial Park Cemetery.

== Selected filmography ==
- Times Square Playboy (1936)
- Bengal Tiger (1936)
- The Bride Came C.O.D. (1941) (uncredited)
- The Three Musketeers (1948)
- Flame of Calcutta (1953)
- The Iron Glove (1954)
- The Silencers (1966) as Pilot (uncredited)
- Batman (1966) as Guard (uncredited)
- Red Tomahawk (1967) as Townsman / Roulette Player
