= Eve Brent =

American actress (1929–2011)

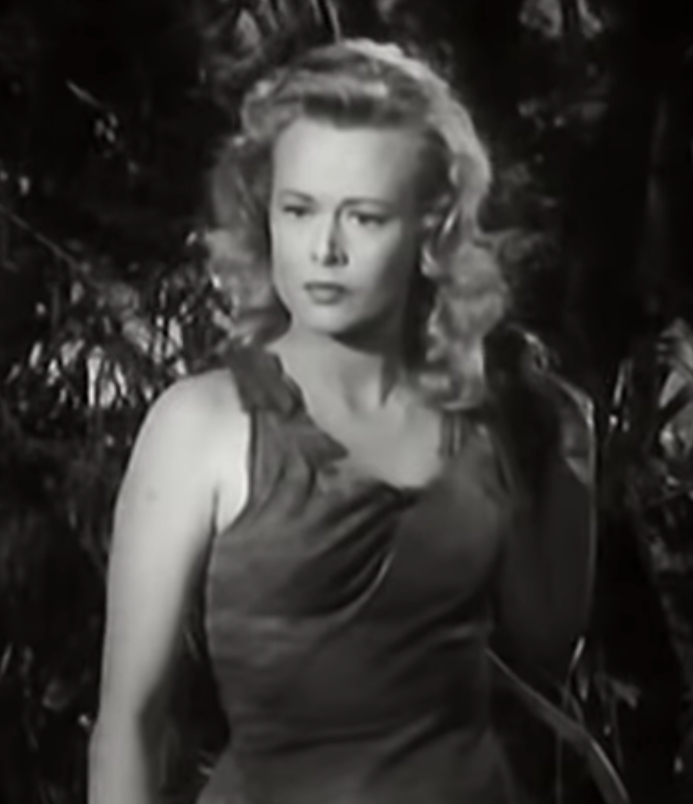
- Brent in Tarzan and the Trappers (1958)
- Born: Jean Ann Ewers; September 11, 1929; Houston, Texas, U.S.
- Died: August 27, 2011 (aged 81); Sun Valley, California, U.S.
- Occupation: Actress
- Years active: 1955–2011
- Known for: Jane in Tarzan's Fight for Life (1958)
- Notable work: Fade to Black (1980)
- Spouses: Jack Baker Lewis (m. 1946; div. 19??); Major Freeman (m. 19??; div. 1958); Neil W. Kidwell (m. 1962; div. 19??); Michael Ashe (m. 1978; died 2008)
- Children: 2
- Awards: Saturn Award for Best Supporting Actress (1980)

Jean Ann Ewers (September 11, 1929 – August 27, 2011), known professionally as Eve Brent and Jean Lewis, was an American actress who portrayed Jane in Tarzan's Fight for Life.

== Biography ==
=== Early years ===
Brent was born Jean Ann Ewers in Houston, Texas, in 1929, and raised in Fort Worth. She appeared on radio, in guest-starring roles and commercials on television, in movies, and on the theater stage.

=== Career ===
Some of her early film work includes roles in Gun Girls (1956), Journey to Freedom (1957), and Forty Guns (1957). She became the 12th actress to play Jane when she appeared opposite Gordon Scott's Tarzan in the film Tarzan's Fight for Life, (1958). She also played the role in Tarzan and the Trappers 1958, three episodes filmed as a pilot for a proposed Tarzan television series and subsequently edited together into a feature film when the series wasn't picked up. She also appeared in the "Girl on the Road" episode of The Veil, a short 1958 Boris Karloff TV series that was never aired but was found in the 1990s and released on DVD. Karloff both hosted and starred in her episode, which was scripted and directed by George Waggner. In 1967, she appeared as Benjie Carver's mother in "The LSD Story" episode of the Dragnet television show.

=== Recognition ===
In 1980, she won a Saturn Award for Best Supporting Actress for her work in Fade to Black. Her best-known recent work in films was her role of Elaine Connelly in The Green Mile, 1999. She continued to work in episodic television and made a guest appearance in Frasier (season one, episode three as the hostess), 2006 on an episode of Scrubs, and 2010 on an episode of Community. She also appeared on Emergency! in 1974 as a lady whose daughter had her toe stuck in the bathtub.

=== Personal life ===
By her 40s, Brent had been married and divorced numerous times. Michael Ashe, her last husband, predeceased her on July 31, 2008.

=== Death ===
Eve Brent died from natural causes on August 27, 2011; she was 81.

== Partial filmography ==
- Female Jungle (1955) — Monica Madison
- The Storm Rider (1957) — Mrs. Cooper (uncredited)
- The Garment Jungle (1957) — Receptionist (uncredited)
- Journey to Freedom (1957) — Mary Raikin
- Forty Guns (1957) — Louvenia Spanger
- Gun Girls (1957) — Joy Jenkins
- The Bride and the Beast (1958) — Stewardess
- Tarzan's Fight for Life (1958) — Jane
- The Sad Horse (1959) — Sheila
- Cage of Evil (1960) — Officer Lucille Barron (uncredited)
- Stakeout! (1962) — Susie
- Mara of the Wilderness (1965) — Mrs. Wade
- A Guide for the Married Man (1967) — Joe X's Blowsy Blonde
- Coogan's Bluff (1968) — Hooker (uncredited)
- The Happy Ending (1969) — Ethel
- Airport (1970) — Mrs. David Corman — Passenger (uncredited)
- Triangle (1970)
- The Barefoot Executive (1971) — Mrs. Crampton
- The Todd Killings (1971)
- How's Your Love Life? (1971) — Mrs. Ryan
- How to Seduce a Woman (1974) — Dr. Sister's Sister
- Timber Tramps (1975) — Corey Sykes
- The White Buffalo (1977) — Frieda
- Fade to Black (1980) — Aunt Stella Binford
- BrainWaves (1982) — Mrs. Simpson
- Going Berserk (1983) — Mrs. Reese
- Racing with the Moon (1984) — Mrs. Kaiser
- Date with an Angel (1987) — Matron #1
- The Experts (1989) — Aunt Thelma
- The Green Mile (1999) — Elaine Connelly
- Between Christmas and New Year's (2000) — May
- Garfield: The Movie (2004) — Mrs. Baker
- Palo Alto (2007) — Grandma
- The Curious Case of Benjamin Button (2008) — Old Woman (uncredited)
- The Hit List (2011) — Mrs. Sheehan
- Ticket Out (2012) — Emma (final film role)
