= H. Bruce Humberstone =

American film director

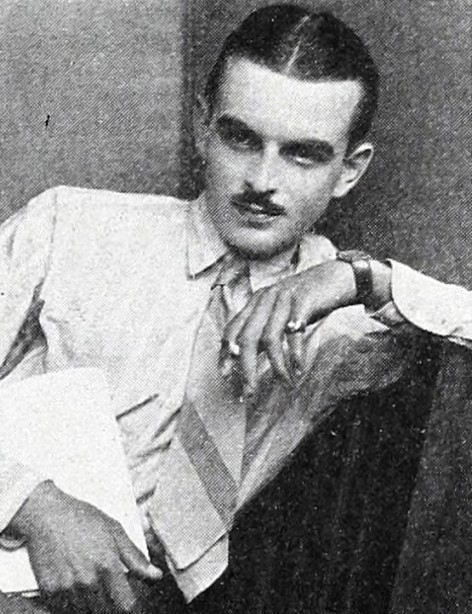
- Humberstone in 1925
- Born: November 18, 1901; Buffalo, New York, US
- Died: October 11, 1984 (aged 82); Los Angeles, California, US
- Resting place: Hollywood Forever Cemetery
- Other names: Lucky Humberstone
- Occupation: Film director
- Years active: 1924–1966
- Employer: 20th Century Fox
- Notable work: Sun Valley Serenade; I Wake Up Screaming; To the Shores of Tripoli

H. Bruce Humberstone (November 18, 1901 – October 11, 1984) was an American film director. He was previously a movie actor (as a child), a script clerk, and an assistant director, working with directors such as King Vidor, Edmund Goulding, and Allan Dwan.

== Early years ==
Humberstone was born in Buffalo, New York, and attended Miami Military Academy in Miami, Florida.

== Film ==
One of 28 founders of the Directors Guild of America, Humberstone worked on several silent movie films for 20th Century Fox. Humberstone did not specialize; he worked on comedies, dramas, and melodramas. Humberstone is best known today for the seminal film noir I Wake Up Screaming (1941) and his work on some of the Charlie Chan films. In the 1950s, Humberstone worked mostly on TV. He retired in 1966.

== Recognition ==
Humberstone has a star on the Hollywood Walk of Fame.

== Death ==
Humberstone died of pneumonia in Woodland Hills, California, on October 11, 1984, aged 82, and was buried at the Hollywood Forever Cemetery in Hollywood, California.

== Partial filmography as director ==
- Street Scene (1931)
- The Crooked Circle (1932)
- If I Had a Million (1932) ("The Forger" segment)
- Goodbye Love (1933)
- King of the Jungle (1933)
- Merry Wives of Reno (1934)
- The Dragon Murder Case (1934)
- Three Live Ghosts (1935)
- Ladies Love Danger (1935)
- Charlie Chan at the Race Track (1936)
- Charlie Chan at the Opera (1936)
- Charlie Chan at the Olympics (1937)
- Charlie Chan in Honolulu (1938)
- Rascals (1938)
- Checkers (1938)
- Pardon Our Nerve (1939)
- Pack Up Your Troubles (1939)
- The Quarterback (1940)
- Lucky Cisco Kid (1940)
- I Wake Up Screaming (1941)
- Sun Valley Serenade (1941)
- Tall, Dark and Handsome (1941)
- Iceland (1942)
- To the Shores of Tripoli (1942)
- Hello, Frisco, Hello (1943)
- Pin Up Girl (1944)
- Wonder Man (1945)
- Three Little Girls in Blue (1946)
- The Homestretch (1947)
- Fury at Furnace Creek (1948)
- South Sea Sinner (1950)
- Happy Go Lovely (1952) British
- She's Working Her Way Through College (1953)
- The Desert Song (1953)
- Ten Wanted Men (1955)
- The Purple Mask (1955)
- Tarzan and the Lost Safari (1957)
- Tarzan's Fight for Life (1958)
- Tarzan and the Trappers (1958)
- Madison Avenue (1961)
