= Gdal Saleski =

American cellist, composer, and author

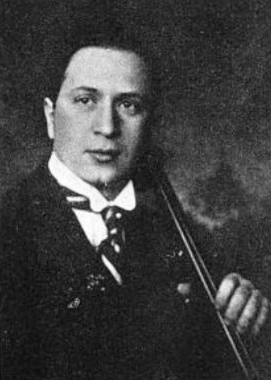
Gdal Saleski

Gdal Saleski (February 11, 1890 – October 8, 1966) was an American cellist and composer of Russian Jewish descent. He is best known for the books of biographies, Famous Musicians Of A Wandering Race (1927) and Famous Musicians of Jewish Origin (1949). The first book contained about 350 biographical sketches. The second one is an expanded edition.

== Biography ==
Gdal Saleski was born in Kiev, then Russian Empire (recorded birth name: Gedaliah), to the family of a veteran soldier Иоселя Гдалевича Залеского и Бейлы Шейваховны Залеской (в девичестве Хахман) The father was a "liberal minded" jeweler. Between the ages of eight and fifteen Gdal was singing in various choirs. In January 1904 he was accepted into the Kiev Imperial Music School to study cello. After the anti-Jewish porgoms in Kiev the family decided to emigrate to the United States, but they could afford to go only to Germany, where Gdal entered the Leipzig Conservatory, from which he graduated in 1911. During the summer season of 1910 he was invited to play in Kiev with the symphonic orchestra of Finnish conductor Georg Schnéevoigt. After the graduation, he played with the Odessa symphony orchestra during the summer season and then he left for St. Petersburg to study in the Royal Conservatory. In 1915, after the start of World War I, Saleski went to play in Sweden, Denmark, and Norway. In 1921 Saleski went to the United States. In 1936 he briefly visited the Soviet Union as a tourist and gave some concerts in Moscow, as well as in Kiev and Zhytomyr. As a composer, he composed and arranged many works, mostly for the cello.

Saleski died of heart illness in Los Angeles on October 8, 1966 and was buried at the Mount Sinai Memorial Park Cemetery.
