= Rickie Sorensen =

American child actor (1946-1994)

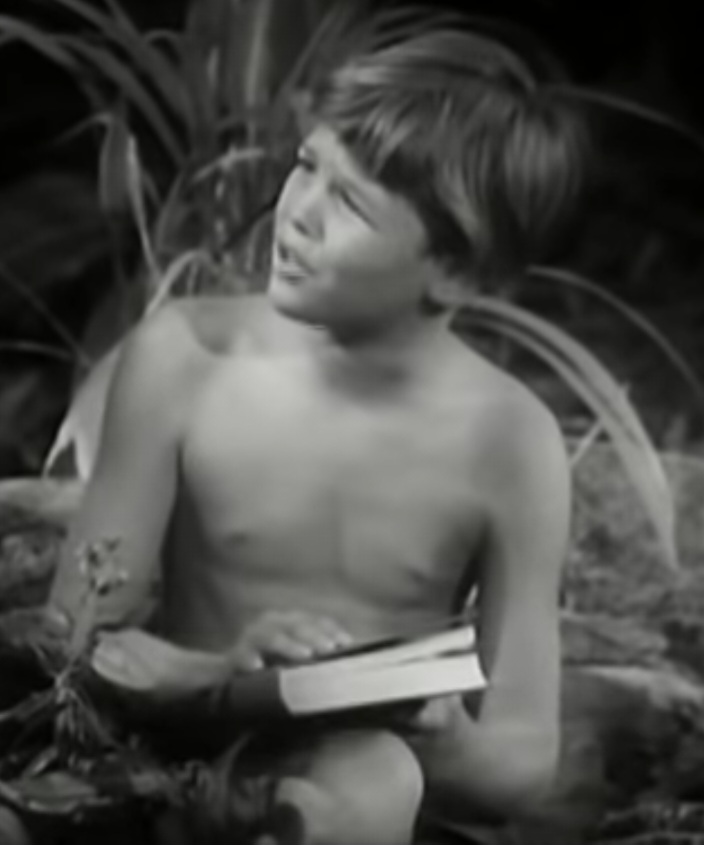
- Sorensen in Tarzan and the Trappers, 1960
- Born: August 26, 1946; Los Angeles, California, U.S.
- Died: August 24, 1994 (aged 47)
- Occupation: Actor
- Years active: 1956–1978
- Spouse: Marianne Rubacha (m. 1974)
- Children: 4

Rickie John Sorensen (August 26, 1946 – August 24, 1994) was an American child actor.

== Biography ==
He was born in Los Angeles on August 26, 1946, the son of Mr. and Mrs. John M. Sorensen. His acting career began in 1956 when he was 10 years old. One of his most notable roles was as one of the voices of the child King Arthur in Disney's The Sword in the Stone. He was also known for portraying Tommy Banks in the main cast of the television series Father of the Bride.

== Personal life ==
In 1974, he married Marianne Rubacha and had four children. He was diagnosed with lung cancer in February 1990, and died on August 24, 1994, aged 47.

== Filmography ==
Year	Title	Role	Notes
1956	The Young Guns	Jake	Uncredited
1956	The Valley of Crimes		not credited
1957	Man Afraid	Danny	Uncredited
1957	Under the Threat		not credited
1957	Ruthless		not credited
1957	The Man With a Thousand Faces	Creighton Chaney at 8	
1957	The Hard Man	Larry Thompson	Uncredited
1958	Tarzan's Fight for Life	Tartu, Tarzan's Adopted Son	
1958	100 Gunshots		
1958	A Lust to Kill	Jeff	
1960	Tarzan and the Trappers	Boy	TV movie
1961	The Revenge of the Gangster		not credited
1961	One Hundred and One Dalmatians	Spotty	Voice, Uncredited
1961	Underworld U.S.A.	Harry	Uncredited
1961–1962	Father of the Bride	Thomas 'Tommy' Banks	34 episodes
1963	Johnny Shiloh	Rusty	TV movie
1963	The Sword in the Stone	Arthur	Voice
1976	Airport '77	Controller #2	
1978	The Cat from Outer Space	Technician	(final film role)
