= William Keene =

American actor

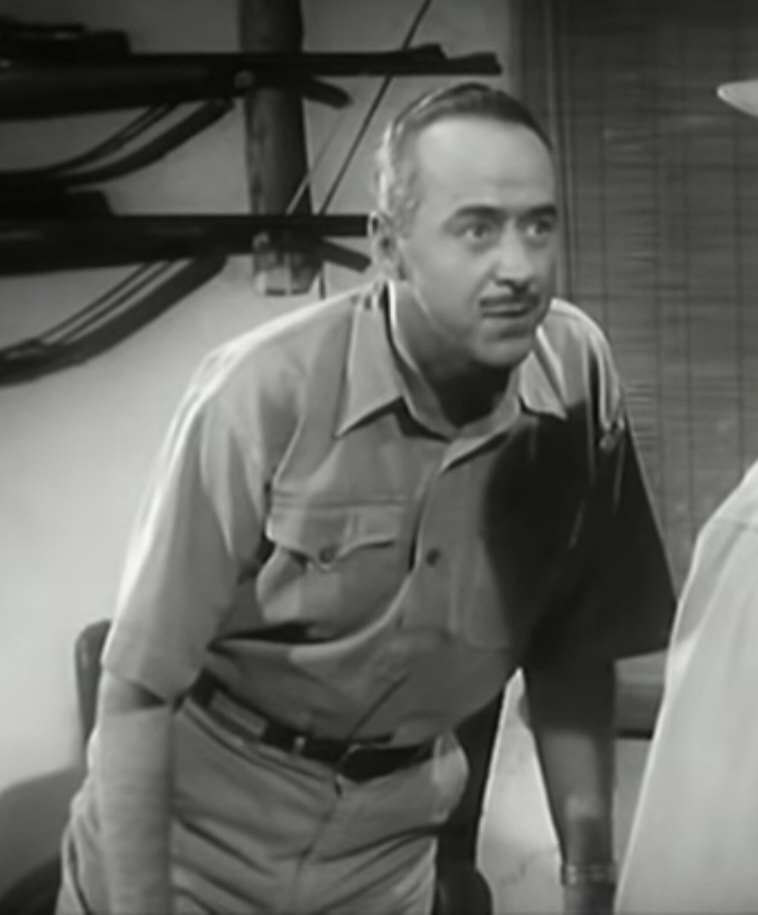
- Keene in Tarzan and the Trappers (1958)
- Born: William Joseph Keene; August 4, 1915; Pennsylvania, U.S.
- Died: May 23, 1992 (aged 76); Los Angeles, California, U.S.
- Resting place: Mount Sinai Memorial Park
- Occupation: Actor
- Years active: 1950–1981

William Joseph Keene (August 4, 1915 – May 23, 1992) was an American radio and television actor who appeared on several popular television shows more than one separate occasion as a different character.

== Career ==
He appeared in shows more than once as a different character such as The Andy Griffith Show, Perry Mason and Mayberry R.F.D.. In 1958, he played the banker Mr. Botkin in the Gunsmoke episode "Kitty Caught" (Season 3, Episode 19). In 1961 he appeared on the television show Twilight Zone in the episodes "The Midnight Sun" and "The Prime Mover", and in an episode of The Asphalt Jungle. He also appeared in "Lamb to the Slaughter", a classic 1958 episode of Alfred Hitchcock Presents. Among his five appearances on Perry Mason, the last two were as Judge Seymour in the show's final season.

== Death ==
He died in Los Angeles on May 23, 1992. He was buried in Mount Sinai Memorial Park.

== Filmography ==
Year	Title	Role	Notes
1958	Alfred Hitchcock Presents	Fingerprint Policeman	Season 3 Episode 28: "Lamb to the Slaughter"
1960	Too Soon to Love	The Doctor	
1960	Key Witness	Judge	Uncredited
1964	Honeymoon Hotel	Mr. Johnson	Uncredited
1968	Speedway	Taxpayer	Uncredited
1973	Heavy Traffic		Voice
1977	Herowork	Judge	
