= Pieces of Dreams (film) =

1970 film by Daniel Haller

- Film poster
- Directed by: Daniel Haller
- Written by: Roger O. Hirson
- Based on: The Wine and the Music; 1968 novel by William E. Barrett
- Produced by: Robert F. Blumofe
- Starring: Robert Forster; Lauren Hutton
- Cinematography: Charles F. Wheeler
- Edited by: William Chulack
- Music by: Michel Legrand
- Distributed by: United Artists
- Release date: September 23, 1970
- Running time: 99 minutes
- Country: United States
- Language: English

Pieces of Dreams is a 1970 drama film, produced in the United States. It was directed by Daniel Haller and is based on the 1968 novel The Wine and the Music by William Edmund Barrett. The story follows the internal struggle of Father Gregory Lind, a Catholic priest who falls in love and starts to question his relationship with the Church.

== Plot ==
Father Gregory Lind (Robert Forster) is a Catholic priest struggling with his life in the priesthood. He wishes to change parishes, but is denied the transfer time after time. The story starts with him arriving at the local hospital after being informed that one of his charges is dying after trying to steal a car. He meets Pamela Gibson (Lauren Hutton) – a widowed and rich social worker from the local Community Center. Together they decide to find out more about the deceased teen.

The pair checks up on Estella Rios (Kathy Baca), the boy's pregnant, underage girlfriend. They don't agree on what should be done about her. Later Father Lind finds out from Mrs. Rios (Miriam Martinez) that Pamela likely took Estella to get an abortion. This leads to more arguments between the two, but they lose importance when Estella ends up in a hospital and miscarries. The social worker breaks down and Father Lind has sex with her after taking her home.

To forget the act and Pamela, he spends time away from her but returns and they go on a romantic weekend in the mountains. To clear up his confusing feelings about his love for the widow and priesthood, Father Lind visits his family, hoping for support. He receives none from his mother (Edith Atwater) when he informs her about his wish to leave the life of a priest, and is forbidden by her from doing so. Feeling angry and betrayed, he takes a vacation and goes to work in a hospital in Santa Fe.

Unknown to him, one of the priests from his parish visits Pamela to force her to leave Father Lind alone, accusing her of trying to destroy his future. The social worker disagrees and visits Lind, but they end up in another argument when Pamela insists that he choose between his love for her and the priesthood. After spending some time at his parish in Albuquerque, Lind visits the Bishop (Will Geer) to inform him about his wish to leave the priesthood. The Bishop cannot change his mind. Lind, no longer a priest, finds Pamela, says he chooses her and they end up together.

== Cast ==
- Robert Forster as Fr. Gregory Lind
- Lauren Hutton as Pamela Gibson
- Will Geer as Bishop
- Ivor Francis as Fr. Paul Schaeffer
- Richard O'Brien as Mons. Francis Hurley
- Edith Atwater as Mrs. Lind
- Mitzi Hoag as Anne Lind
- Rudy Diaz as Sgt. Bill Walkingstick
- Sam Javis as Leo Rose
- Gail Bonney as Mrs. Tietgens
- Helen Westcott as Mrs. Straub
- Joanne Moore Jordan as Bar Girl
- Miriam Martinez as Mrs. Rios
- Kathy Baca as Estella Rios
- Eloy Casados as Charlie, the Jailed Boy
- Raimundo Baca as Gunshot Victim
- Robert McCoy as Employment Agency Interviewer

== Release and reception ==
=== US rating ===
The film was rated PG in United States. The rating has been changed to PG-13 for thematic elements, sexual material and some language in 2011.

=== Home media ===
The film was released on DVD on March 12, 2012.

=== Accolades ===
Award	Category	Nominee(s)	Result	Ref.
Academy Awards	Best Song – Original for the Picture	"Pieces of Dreams"; Music by Michel Legrand; Lyrics by Alan and Marilyn Bergman	Nominated	
Golden Globe Awards	Best Original Song – Motion Picture	"Pieces of Dreams"; Music by Michel Legrand; Lyrics by Alan and Marilyn Bergman	Nominated	

== See also ==
- List of American films of 1970

== Future reading ==
- Hanson. Peter. 29 March 2012. Pieces Of Dreams. Blogger.
- Lukeman. William. 18 August 2012. Pieces Of Dreams: Stuck between pretty & girtty. Amazon.
