= Gail Bonney =

American actress (1901–1984)

- Bonney in an episode of Lock-Up (1961)
- Born: Goldie Bonowitz; December 15, 1901; Columbus, Ohio, U.S.
- Died: December 7, 1984 (aged 82); Los Angeles, California, U.S.
- Resting place: Mount Sinai Memorial Park
- Occupation: Actress
- Years active: c. 1930s–1979
- Spouse: Joe Solomon

Gail Bonney (born Goldie Bonowitz; December 15, 1901 – December 7, 1984) was an American actress whose career encompassed radio, stage, film and television. She began her professional career in radio and became known for her ability to perform dialects. By the 1940s she was working as a freelance radio actress in Chicago and was also teaching dialects at dramatic schools. She later worked extensively in Hollywood, appearing in supporting and uncredited roles in numerous films and television programs.

Among her better-known screen appearances were The Fountainhead (1949), Beyond the Forest (1949), The Fuller Brush Girl (1950), People Will Talk (1951), Bell, Book and Candle (1958), The Tingler (1959), Days of Wine and Roses (1962), The Computer Wore Tennis Shoes (1969), and Herbie Rides Again (1974). On television, she appeared in numerous series, including I Love Lucy, Perry Mason, The Beverly Hillbillies, Star Trek, The Alfred Hitchcock Hour, The Six Million Dollar Man, Barnaby Jones, and Emergency!.

== Early life and education ==
Bonney was born Goldie Bonowitz in Columbus, Ohio, on December 15, 1901. She majored in languages at Ohio State University, were she had she had perfected 46 dialects. Bonney also attended the NBC's radio school at Northwestern University.

== Career ==
Bonney established herself as a radio actress in Chicago. Her radio credits included Bachelor's Children, Ma Perkins, Sweet River, and American Women. In Bachelor's Children, she played a nurse during a storyline involving Ruth Ann, while on Sweet River she played Mrs. Skogland, a Norwegian character.

Bonney's principal specialty in dialect work made her being called upon by producers when specialized dialect work was required for daytime serials or radio presentations. She also performed dialect work for commercial transcriptions and taught dialects at several Chicago dramatic schools.

Bonney described the preparation she undertook for dialect roles. For her role as the Norwegian Mrs. Skogland, she said that she consulted books and other sources and eventually went to the Norwegian consul in Chicago to find someone with whom she could practice the dialect.

Her vocal range allowed her to portray characters of widely different ages, as she played in radio both a three-year-old child and a 75-year-old woman.

Bonney continued to work in radio after moving into film and television. In 1951, she appeared as Aunt Emma in a Screen Directors' Playhouse radio production of I Remember the Night, broadcast on KFI and starring William Holden.

Bonney also appeared on Hedda Hopper's radio program for three weeks.

Bonney also worked in live theatre. In 1950 she appeared at the Pasadena Playhouse in One Foot in Heaven, based on the 1941 film of the same name.

In 1958, Bonney appeared at the Biltmore Theatre in Los Angeles in the stage production of Auntie Mame, playing Fan Burnside, a cousin by marriage of Eve Arden's character.

Bonney began appearing in films in the late 1940s, generally in supporting or uncredited roles. Her early screen appearances included The Fountainhead (1949), Beyond the Forest (1949), and Adventure in Baltimore (1949).

Her 1950 film work included The Fuller Brush Girl, in which she played a babysitter, as well as Caged, A Woman of Distinction, The Secret Fury, Whirlpool, and 711 Ocean Drive.

In 1951, she appeared as the dean's secretary in the film People Will Talk, starred by Cary Grant.

Her later film appearances included Magnificent Obsession (1954), Deep in My Heart (1954), Written on the Wind (1956), Bell, Book and Candle (1958), Too Much, Too Soon (1958), The Tingler (1959), Please Don't Eat the Daisies (1960), Inherit the Wind (1960), Days of Wine and Roses (1962), Mary, Mary (1963), Cat Ballou (1965), A Fine Madness (1966), Rosemary's Baby (1968), The Computer Wore Tennis Shoes (1969), Pieces of Dreams (1970), and Herbie Rides Again (1974).

In 1962, She appeared in Days of Wine and Roses, directed by Blake Edwards and starring Jack Lemmon and Lee Remick, she played Gladys, the cleaning lady, in an uncredited role.

She appearanced on Life with Elizabeth, in which she played Alvin's former schoolteacher, appearing opposite Del Moore and Betty White.

Bonney appeared on other television programs including December Bride, Our Miss Brooks, The Colgate Comedy Hour, and I Love Lucy.

Her later television credits included Perry Mason, The Beverly Hillbillies, Bonanza, The Lucy Show, Petticoat Junction, That Girl, The Addams Family, Green Acres, The Big Valley, Mannix, Ironside, Dragnet, The Mod Squad, It Takes a Thief, Barnaby Jones, Emergency!, Planet of the Apes, Kolchak: The Night Stalker, and The Six Million Dollar Man.

In 1967, Bonney appeared in the Star Trek: The Original Series episode "Catspaw" as the Second Witch.

Her later television work included productions such as The Late Liz, Kingston: Confidential, Project U.F.O., and Delta House.

Bonney's final known film appearance was in Herbie Rides Again (1974), in which she played a rich woman in a mansion.

== Personal life and death ==
Bonney was married to Joe Solomon. She died in Los Angeles, California, on 1984, at the age of 82 and was buried in Mount Sinai Memorial Park.

== Filmography ==
=== Film ===
Year	Title	Role
1947	Slippy McGee	Gossipy Woman (uncredited)
1948	One Sunday Afternoon	Vocalist (uncredited)
1949	The Fountainhead	Woman (uncredited)
1949	Adventure in Baltimore	Townswoman (uncredited)
1949	Beyond the Forest	Woman (uncredited)
1949	Prison Warden	Convict Wife (uncredited)
1949	Alias the Champ	Autograph Seeker (uncredited)
1949	The Reckless Moment	Woman (uncredited)
1949	The Doctor and the Girl	Nurse (uncredited)
1949	Abbott and Costello Meet the Killer, Boris Karloff	First Maid (uncredited)
1949	The Red Menace	Woman Outside Real Estate Office (uncredited)
1949	Side Street	Woman (voice, uncredited)
1950	The Killer That Stalked New York	Observer in Crowd (uncredited)
1950	Sunset in the West	Townswoman (uncredited)
1950	The Fuller Brush Girl	Babysitter (uncredited)
1950	711 Ocean Drive	Chippie's Date (uncredited)
1950	Love That Brute	Woman on Ship with Necklace (uncredited)
1950	Caged	Inmate (uncredited)
1950	A Woman of Distinction	Margaret, Bicycler (uncredited)
1950	The Secret Fury	Nurse (uncredited)
1950	Whirlpool	Minor Role (uncredited)
1951	The Company She Keeps	Nurse (uncredited)
1951	Rhubarb	Woman with Dog (uncredited)
1951	People Will Talk	Dean's Secretary (uncredited)
1951	Here Comes the Groom	Telephone Operator (uncredited)
1951	Death of a Salesman	Mother (uncredited)
1952	Love Is Better Than Ever	Mrs. Gelschlager (uncredited)
1952	The Sniper	Woman at Darr Murder Scene (uncredited)
1952	Flesh and Fury	Teacher (uncredited)
1952	Singin' in the Rain	Audience Member (uncredited)
1952	My Son John	Jail Matron (scenes deleted)
1952	Gobs and Gals	Undetermined Supporting Role (uncredited)
1952	Carrie	Older Chorus Girl (uncredited)
1952	Assignment – Paris!	Phone Operator (uncredited)
1952	Bonzo Goes to College	Maid (uncredited)
1952	Million Dollar Mermaid	Outraged Woman at Revere Beach (uncredited)
1952	Because of You	Nurse (uncredited)
1952	The Member of the Wedding	Townswoman (uncredited)
1953	Dream Wife	Small Boy's Mother (uncredited)
1953	So You Want a Television Set	Neighbor Wife (uncredited)
1953	It Happens Every Thursday	Miss Newton (uncredited)
1953	The Lady Wants Mink	Landlady (uncredited)
1953	The Blue Gardenia	Policewoman (uncredited)
1954	Deep in My Heart	Lodge Guest (uncredited)
1954	Magnificent Obsession	Phyllis (uncredited)
1954	Tooting Tooters	Andy's Wife
1955	The Glass Slipper	Bit Role (uncredited)
1955	Not as a Stranger	Mrs. Fields (uncredited)
1955	Ain't Misbehavin'	Mr. Dullaby (uncredited)
1956	Crime of Passion	Mrs. London
1956	The Opposite Sex	Gossip (uncredited)
1956	Written on the Wind	Hotel Floorlady (uncredited)
1956	The Best Things in Life Are Free	Woman in Back Row (uncredited)
1956	Bigger Than Life	Mother at PTA Meeting (uncredited)
1956	Red Sundown	Mrs. Clore (uncredited)
1956	The Killer Is Loose	Mrs. Andrews (uncredited)
1956	Come Next Spring	Mrs. Totter (uncredited)
1957	The Female Animal	Vanessa Windsor's Maid (uncredited)
1957	Pal Joey	Heavyset Woman (uncredited)
1957	The Careless Years	Saleslady (uncredited)
1958	The World Was His Jury	Hysterical Woman Passenger (uncredited)
1958	Day of the Badman	Townswoman (uncredited)
1958	The Perfect Furlough	Spinster (uncredited)
1958	Home Before Dark	Mental Hospital Clerk (uncredited)
1958	Bell, Book and Candle	Betty, Merle's Maid (uncredited)
1958	The Last Hurrah	Woman (uncredited)
1958	Flying Saucer Daffy	Mother
1958	Too Much, Too Soon	Nurse (uncredited)
1958	Going Steady	Mrs. Vivny / Faculty Member (uncredited)
1959	The Tingler	Member of Silent Movie Audience (uncredited)
1960	Please Don't Eat the Daisies	Miss Bonney (uncredited)
1960	Inherit the Wind	Fundamentalist Woman (uncredited)
1960	Bells Are Ringing	Minor Role (uncredited)
1962	Days of Wine and Roses	Gladys (uncredited)
1962	Gypsy	Stage Mother (uncredited)
1962	Rome Adventure	Dormitory Mistress at Briarcliff (uncredited)
1963	Mary, Mary	Cleaning Woman (uncredited)
1965	Cat Ballou	Mabel Bentley (uncredited)
1966	A Fine Madness	Miss Buehler (uncredited)
1968	Rosemary's Baby	Babysitter (voice, uncredited)
1969	The Computer Wore Tennis Shoes	Winifred, Dean's Secretary (uncredited)
1970	Pieces of Dreams	Mrs. Tietgens
1970	RPM	Miss Vickers (uncredited)
1974	Herbie Rides Again	Rich Woman in Mansion

=== Television ===
Year	Title	Role
1951	The Stu Erwin Show	TV series
1951	Front Page Detective	Cleaning Woman
1952	I Love Lucy	Mrs. Hudson
1953	The Cisco Kid	Minnie Higgins
1953	Schlitz Playhouse	TV series
1953	Biff Baker, U.S.A.	Madame Dussard
1953	Ford Theatre	TV series
1953	Space Patrol	Goodwife Martin
1954	I Led 3 Lives	Comrade Bess
1954	The Red Skelton Hour	Mrs. von Klein Shagnasty; Mrs. Lump Lump-Golf Sketch
1955	Climax!	TV series
1955	The George Burns and Gracie Allen Show	Mrs. Johnson; The Mother; The Woman at the Store
1955	The Millionaire	Matron
1955	Our Miss Brooks	Miss Hannibal; Mrs. Ferguson
1955	The Mickey Rooney Show	Mrs. Symington
1955	It's a Great Life	Clubwoman
1956	The 20th Century Fox Hour	Toy Shop Owner
1956	December Bride	Madeline; Madeline Schweitzer; Virginia ...
1956	The People's Choice	Mrs. Moore
1957	Studio 57	TV series
1957	The Mickey Mouse Club	Prim Woman
1957	The Hardy Boys: The Mystery of the Ghost Farm	Prim Woman (1957)
1957	The Loretta Young Show	Teresa; Aunt Eleanor
1957	Lux Video Theatre	Woman
1957	Dragnet	Woman
1958	Shirley Temple's Storybook	1st Old Woman
1958	77 Sunset Strip	Employment Agent
1958	Highway Patrol	Ella
1958	The Restless Gun	Mrs. Amy Dratton; Mrs. Fickett
1958	Sky King	Mrs. Barrett
1959	Westinghouse Desilu Playhouse	TV series
1959	M Squad	Lenore Ashton
1959	The Deputy	Mrs. Peterson
1959	Cheyenne	Troupe Member; Stage Passenger
1959	Riverboat	Passenger
1959	Richard Diamond, Private Detective	Mrs. Miles
1959	The DuPont Show with June Allyson	Mrs. Zovanka; Woman
1959	Wagon Train	Wagon Train Member; Mrs. Wilson; Mrs. Mahoney
1959	Markham	Landlady; Flora; Tourist; Mrs. Cowell
1960	Death Valley Days	Miss Almy; Kate
1960	Laramie	Farmer's Wife
1960	Bachelor Father	Woman seeking dog; Mrs. Fosgood
1960	Dante	Old Maid
1960	Tate	Maudeen
1960	Perry Mason	Maid; Harriet
1960	One Step Beyond	Tourist
1960	Johnny Midnight	Reporter
1960	The DuPont Show with June Allyson	Mrs. Zovanka; Woman
1961	Checkmate	Grace Canfield
1961	Maverick	Townswoman; Wife
1961	87th Precinct	Mrs. Courtney
1961	Leave It to Beaver	The Woman Clerk
1961	The Untouchables	Nurse (uncredited)
1961	Pete and Gladys	TV series
1961	Whispering Smith	Hotel Manager
1961	Angel	Mrs. Jackson
1961	Hawaiian Eye	Nurse
1961	Bronco	Mrs. Johnson
1961	Lock-Up	Mrs. Powell
1962	Rawhide	Woman Customer
1962	Checkmate	Grace Canfield
1962	Maverick	Townswoman; Wife
1962	87th Precinct	Mrs. Courtney
1962	The Name of the Game	Matron; Landlady
1962	My Three Sons	Mrs. Anderson; Nurse #5
1962	Ben Casey	Ward Nurse
1962	Tales of Wells Fargo	Stagecoach Passenger; Elizabeth Jennings
1962	Alfred Hitchcock Presents	Secretary; The Woman; Drugstore Customer; Mrs. Lewis
1962	General Electric Theater	Inga; McClure's Wife
1962	Lawman	Mrs. Wilson; Woman
1963	Arrest and Trial	Margaret
1963	Glynis	Mrs. Butterworth
1963	Going My Way	Woman
1963	The Dakotas	Amy Jackson
1964	Burke's Law	Woman Attendant
1964	Bonanza	Mrs. Partridge; Martha Daggert
1964	The Jack Benny Program	Autograph Hound; First Woman in Line; Aunt Sudie
1965	My Brother the Angel	Nursemaid; Woman in Audience
1965	Run for Your Life	Mrs. Simms
1965	Conway	Mrs. Hansen
1965	Green Acres	Mrs. Miller
1965	Tammy	Aunt Claude
1965	Cat Ballou	Mabel Bentley (uncredited)
1965	The Addams Family	Police Woman
1965	The Alfred Hitchcock Hour	The Elderly Woman; Mrs. Hayes; Mrs. Harris ...
1965	The Lucy Show	Customer
1965	Wagon Train	Wagon Train Member; Mrs. Wilson; Mrs. Mahoney
1966	The Road West	Mrs. Stone
1966	Petticoat Junction	Mrs. Tomley; First Lady; Mrs. Robinson
1966	Pistols 'n' Petticoats	Mrs. Sanders
1967	Star Trek	Second Witch
1967	The Beverly Hillbillies	Mrs. Travis-Robinson
1967	The Big Valley	Housekeeper
1967	Dragnet 1967	Mrs. Anna Logan, the landlady; Mrs. Bonney
1967	The Virginian	Mrs. Henderson; Lady; Farm Woman
1968	I Spy	Secretary
1968	Mannix	Mrs. Timmins
1968	Something for a Lonely Man	Townswoman (uncredited)
1968	The Mod Squad	Mrs. Drew (uncredited)
1968	Here's Lucy	Dolores
1968	It Takes a Thief	Matron
1969	Blondie	Woman #1
1969	The Computer Wore Tennis Shoes	Winifred, Dean's Secretary (uncredited)
1969	The Name of the Game	Matron; Landlady
1969	My Three Sons	Mrs. Anderson; Nurse #5
1969	Marcus Welby, M.D.	Mrs. Billings; Mrs. Doremus; Mrs. Doran
1970	That Girl	Mrs. Smith
1970	The Bold Ones: The Senator	Dinner Party Guest (uncredited)
1970	This Is the Life	Aunt Vera
1971	Night Gallery	Mrs. Squire
1971	The Smith Family	Apartment Manager
1971	The Late Liz	Gladys
1971	Ironside	Secretary; Emma; Josephine McMurtry ...
1971	The Young Lawyers	Mrs. Brown
1972	Get to Know Your Rabbit	Governess (uncredited)
1972	The Bold Ones: The New Doctors	Patient; Mrs. Tate
1973	Gunsmoke	Townswoman; Mrs. Peary; Mrs. Hawkins
1973	The Devil's Daughter	First Woman
1973	Emergency!	Martha Burke
1973	My Darling Daughters' Anniversary	Helen
1974	Doc Elliot	Lucille
1974	McCloud	Nurse (uncredited)
1974	Barnaby Jones	Dr. Kohlmeyer's Maid
1974	Planet of the Apes	Old Woman
1974	The Texas Wheelers	Mrs. Noely
1975	Lincoln	Courtroom Spectator (uncredited)
1975	Streetkill	Landlady
1975	Kolchak: The Night Stalker	Barham
1976	Kingston: Confidential	Mrs. Mooney
1977	The Six Million Dollar Man	Society Matron
1977	Quincy, M.E.	Scrub Woman
1978	Project U.F.O.	Passenger
1979	Delta House	Librarian
