= Tarzan and the Trappers =

- Directed by: Charles F. Haas; Sandy Howard; H. Bruce Humberstone (uncredited)
- Written by: Frederick Schlick, Robert Leach
- Based on: Characters created by Edgar Rice Burroughs
- Produced by: Sol Lesser
- Starring: Gordon Scott; Eve Brent; Rickie Sorensen; Lesley Bradley
- Cinematography: William Snyder; Alan Stensvold
- Edited by: George Gittens
- Music by: Audrey Granville
- Color process: Black and white
- Distributed by: Sol Lesser Productions
- Release date: March 21, 1960
- Running time: 70-74 minutes
- Country: United States
- Language: English

Tarzan and the Trappers is a 1960 action adventure film featuring Edgar Rice Burroughs' famous jungle hero Tarzan and starring Gordon Scott, Eve Brent, Rickie Sorensen and Lesley Bradley. The twentieth film of the Tarzan film series that began with 1932's Tarzan the Ape Man, it was filmed in 1958 as three pilot episodes for a television series which were edited into a feature film when the project was abandoned. As a television project, it was shot in black-and-white rather than color, like other contemporary Tarzan films, including Tarzan's Fight for Life, released later the same year. The film did finally appear on television, but only in 1966. It was shot in Chatsworth, California.

== Plot ==
The idyllic jungle life of Tarzan (Gordon Scott), Jane (Eve Brent) and Tartu (Rickie Sorensen) is interrupted by a drum message telling them of predatory hunters loose in the jungle. Tarzan disrupts the animal-collecting expedition of the hunters, Schroeder (Lesley Bradley) and Rene (Maurice Marsac); he frees a baby elephant whose mother they have killed and then leads the elephant herd against them when they make hostages of Tartu and Cheeta the chimp.

Afterwards he warns off two other hunters, Sikes (Saul Gorse) and Lapin (William Keene), seeking to plunder the lost city of Zarbo. He is attacked by their men, but escapes and shadows their party. Aware of Tarzan's continued presence, the hunters capture his native friend Tyana (Sherman Crothers), and trap the ape man when he tries to free him. Tyana's tribe rescues the two. Finally, the hunters reach Zarbo, but find it empty of both people and treasure. In a final conflict, Tarzan overcomes the villains, who are then turned over to the authorities by the natives.

== Cast ==
- Gordon Scott as Tarzan
- Eve Brent as Jane
- Rickie Sorensen as Tartu
- Lesley Bradley as Schroeder
- Maurice Marsac as Rene
- Bruce Lester as Commissioner Brandini
- Naaman Brown as Tribesman
- Paul Thompson as Tribesman
- Carl Christian as Tribesman
- Sol Gorss as Sikes (as Saul Gorse)
- William Keene as Lapin
- Sherman Crothers as Tyana (as Sherman Crothers)
- Madame Sul-Te-Wan as Witch Woman
- Paul Stader as Sikes' Henchman
- Don Blackman as Tribesman
