= Bill Novey =

- Born: 1948; Downers Grove, Illinois
- Died: August 1, 1991 (aged 42–43); Burbank, California
- Occupations: Special Effects Master / Head of Special Effects at Walt Disney Imagineering/ co-founder of Art & Technology, Inc.
- Spouse: Jody Van Meter

William Novey (1948–1991) was an American special effects guru in Hollywood, Head of Special Effects at Walt Disney Imagineering in the 1970s, and co-founder of Art & Technology, Inc. with Disney executive Joe Garlington in the 1980s.

At Disney, Novey was tasked with overseeing 6000 special effects in the Epcot Center near Orlando, Florida and Tokyo Disneyland. He invented over 300 projectors and helped inspire a new wave of special effects and technological innovations including the first use of holograms and vector-scanning laser projections in a theme park.

At Art & Technology, Novey developed a number of special effects and high-tech exhibits seen in various theme parks around the world, including the first motion-simulator in a museum.

Novey holds a number of US patents.

== Personal life ==
He was born William E. Novey in 1948 in Downers Grove, Illinois.

Novey earned bachelor's degrees in mechanical and electrical engineering, and a Master's in Theater Technology from California Institute of the Arts.

He was married to entertainment executive Jody Van Meter.

He died in 1991 at age 43 from Non-Hodgkin's lymphoma. He is buried at the Mount Sinai Memorial Park Cemetery in the Hollywood Hills.

In October 2008, a bench was donated in Novey's honor in the Garden Walk at the library in his hometown of Downers Grove, Illinois with an inscription that reads: "William E. Novey, Who Made the World a Happier Place."
