= Studio executive =

Film studio employee

A studio executive is an employee of a film studio or a corporation doing business in the entertainment industry.

A studio executive may be a chief executive officer (CEO), a chief financial officer (CFO), or a chief operating officer (COO), or be employed to serve in a variety of vice presidential capacities, such as senior vice president of corporate relations.

A studio executive may oversee production or may serve in a role identical to a corporation that is not involved in the entertainment industry.

Studio executive is commonly used to describe someone who takes responsibility for all interests, financial or otherwise, between the film studio and the production company of a film.

== Sources ==
- Levy, Frederick (2000). Hollywood 101: The Film Industry.
